= Magnolia Award for Best Supporting Actress in a Television Series =

Chinese TV award

Magnolia Award for Best Supporting Actress is awarded under the Shanghai Television Festival.

== Winners and nominees ==
=== 2020s ===
| Year | Winner and nominees | English title | Original title |
|---|---|---|---|
| 2026 | Chi Peng | This Thriving Land | 生万物 |
| 2026 | Lan Xiya | Man's Inhumanity to Man | 反人类暴行 |
| 2026 | Mei Ting | Born to Be Alive | 生命树 |
| 2026 | Qin Hailu | This Thriving Land | 生万物 |
| 2026 | Zhu Yuanyuan | The Dream Maker | 小城大事 |
| 2025 | Jiang Xin | Romance in the Alley | 小巷人家 |
| 2025 | Lan Xiya | She and Her Girls | 山花烂漫时 |
| 2025 | Ma Su | We are Criminal Police | 我是刑警 |
| 2025 | Wan Qian | The Tale of Rose | 玫瑰的故事 |
| 2025 | Wu Yue | Me and My Family | 180天重启计划 |
| 2024 | Jiang Yan | Always On the Move | 南来北往 |
| 2024 | Joan Chen | The Heart | 问心 |
| 2024 | Fan Tiantian | Blossoms Shanghai | 繁花 |
| 2024 | Ni Hongjie | Fake It Till You Make It | 装腔启示录 |
| 2024 | Song Jia | The Forerunner | 问苍茫 |
| 2023 | Liu Dan | Reset | 开端 |
| 2023 | Huang Xiaolei | A Lifelong Journey | 人世间 |
| 2023 | Sa Rina | A Lifelong Journey | 人世间 |
| 2023 | Ren Suxi | Remembrance of Things Past | 我在他乡挺好的 |
| 2023 | Yan Bingyan | Enemy | 对手 |
| 2021 | Huang Yao | Minning Town | 山海情 |
| 2021 | Liu Lin | Awakening Age | 觉醒年代 |
| 2021 | Mao Xiaotong | Nothing But Thirty | 三十而已 |
| 2021 | Qin Hailu | The Stage | 装台 |
| 2021 | Ren Min | Serenade of Peaceful Joy | 清平乐 |
| 2020 | Tao Hong | A Little Reunion | 小欢喜 |
| 2020 | Yong Mei | A Little Reunion | 小欢喜 |
| 2020 | Mei Ting | On the Road | 在远方 |
| 2020 | Li Chun | The New World | 新世界 |
| 2020 | Deng Jiajia | Empress of the Ming | 大明风华 |

=== 2010s ===
| Year | Winner and nominees | English title | Original title |
|---|---|---|---|
| 2019 | Tong Yao | Like a Flowing River | 大江大河 |
| 2019 | Li Nian | All Is Well | 都挺好 |
| 2019 | Liu Lin | The Story of Minglan | 知否？知否？应是绿肥红瘦 |
| 2019 | Tian Hairong | The Story of Zheng Yang Gate | 正阳门下小女人 |
| 2019 | Sa Rina | The City of the Family | 那座城这家人 |
| 2018 | Xu Di | The First Half of My Life | 我的前半生 |
| 2018 | Jiang Shan | ER Doctor | 急诊科医生 |
| 2018 | Li Qin | White Deer Plain | 白鹿原 |
| 2018 | Wan Qian | Game of Hunting | 猎场 |
| 2018 | Wu Yue | The First Half of My Life | 我的前半生 |
| 2017 | Guan Xiaotong | To Be a Better Man | 好先生 |
| 2017 | Hu Jing | In the Name of the People | 人民的名义 |
| 2017 | Wang Ziwen | Ode to Joy | 欢乐颂 |
| 2017 | Yang Zi | Ode to Joy | 欢乐颂 |
| 2017 | Dilraba Dilmurat | Ten Miles of Peach Blossoms | 三生三世十里桃花 |
| 2016 | Liu Tao | The Legend of Mi Yue | 芈月传 |
| 2016 | Liu Mintao | Nirvana in Fire | 琅琊榜 |
| 2016 | Ada Liu | Young Marshal | 少帅 |
| 2016 | Wang Ou | The Disguiser | 伪装者 |
| 2016 | Dong Jie | Tiger Mom | 虎妈猫爸 |
| 2015 | Qin Hailu | Red Sorghum | 红高粱 |
| 2015 | Jiang Xin | The Chinese Farmers | 老农民 |
| 2015 | Jiang Shuying | A Servant Of Two Masters | 平凡的世界 |
| 2015 | Huo Siyan | Distant Thunder | 草帽警察 |
| 2015 | He Saifei | Woman In A Family Of Swordsman | 刀客家族的女人 |
