= Kong Sheng =

Chinese actor and director

- 孔笙
- Born: 1960 (age 65–66); Shandong, China
- Occupations: Cinematographer, actor, director
- Years active: 1990-present
- Agent: Daylight Entertainment
- Notable work: Romance of Our Parents; All Quiet in Peking; Nirvana in Fire; Ode to Joy
- Children: 1

Kong Sheng (Chinese: 孔笙; pinyin: Kǒng Shēng; born 1960) is a Chinese cinematographer, actor and director best known for his directorial works Romance of Our Parents (2014), All Quiet in Peking (2014), Nirvana in Fire (2015), and Ode to Joy (2016). "Taking Time to Exercise Caution" 2026

== Early life and education ==
Kong was born in Shandong in 1960. After college, he worked in a periodical agency as an editor.

== Career ==
In 1990, Kong Sheng worked as photography assistant in Zhang Xinjian and Liu Ziyun's historical television series Confucius. His 1990s work includes Romance in Manchuria, Story of the Street, Kong Fansen, and Daughter of Ali Mountain.

Kong made his directorial debut Policeman Cheng Guangquan in 1996.

In 1998, he worked with director Sun Bo in Police 110, which won the first prize in the China TV Golden Eagle Awards. That same year, his work The Holy Flame on the Sea won Outstanding Photography at the Flying Apsaras Awards.

In 2006, Kong directed Guandong Adventure, the series stars Li Youbin, Sa Rina, Song Jia, Zhu Yawen, Niu Li, and Liu Xiangjing. It received mainly positive reviews and won seven awards at the China TV Golden Eagle Awards.

In 2012, he co-directed with Li Xue in Legend of Entrepreneurship, which broadcast in CCTV-1.

In 2013, Kong co-directed with Li Xue again in All Quiet in Peking, which stars Liu Ye, Chen Baoguo, Ni Dahong, Liao Fan, Zu Feng, Dong Yong, and Jiao Huang. The TV drama won several awards, such as Best Television Awards at the 5th Macau International Television Festival and Shanghai Television Festival, and Golden Angel Award at the Chinese-American Film Festival. Kong was awarded the Outstanding Award at the 30th Flying Apsaras Awards.

In 2014, he co-directed with Li Xue in the historical television series Nirvana in Fire. The series stars Hu Ge, Liu Tao and Wang Kai. It won numerous awards, including Flying Apsaras Awards, Macau International Television Festival, China TV Drama Awards, Huading Awards, Shanghai Television Festival, and Golden Eagle Awards.

In 2015, Kong directed Ode to Joy with Jian Chuanhe. The drama received mainly positive reviews and became one of the most watched ones in mainland China in that year.

In 2016, he directed Nirvana in Fire 2 with Li Xue, the sequel to 2014's Nirvana in Fire.

== Filmography ==
=== As director ===
Television

Year	English title	Chinese title	Notes
1996	Hot Seasons	燃情四季	
1996	Policeman Cheng Guangquan	民警程广泉	
1996	A Drop of Sunshine	一滴阳光	
1998	The Holy Flame on the Sea	海上圣火	
1998	Rainy Season in Kuala Lumpur	吉隆坡的雨季	
1998	Police 110	警方110	
2000	Strange Stories from a Chinese Studio	聊斋人鬼情缘	
2002	Unnecessarily Judgment	未被审判	
2003	Sun	好太阳	
2005	Tea-Horse Road	茶马古道	
2005	Behind the City Gate	前门楼子九丈九	
2005	Uncrackable Cases in the Palace	明宫迷案	
2008	Guandong Adventure	闯关东	
2008	Top Secret Escort	绝密押运	
2008	Full Stop of Love	爱情句号	
2009	The Line	生死线	
2011	Iron Age	钢铁年代	
2011	Windmill	风车	
2012	Legend of Entrepreneurship	温州一家人	
2014	Romance oF Our Parents	父母爱情	
2014	Battle of Changsha	战长沙	
2014	All Quiet in Peking	北平无战事	
2015	Nirvana in Fire	琅琊榜	
2015	Legend of Entrepreneurship 2	温州两家人	
2016	Ode to Joy	欢乐颂	
2016	Candle in the Tomb	鬼吹灯	
2017	Nirvana in Fire 2	琅琊榜之风起长林	
2018	Like a Flowing River	大江大河	
2021	Minning Town	山海情	
2022	Bright Future	县委大院	
2024	Like a Flowing River 3	大江大河之岁月如歌	

Film

Year	English title	Chinese title	Notes
2004	The Hunter	狩猎者	Television film
2008	Ultimate Rescue	极限救援	Television film
2010	Partners in Heaven	天上的伙伴	Television film
2011	Reviving of Beichuan	北川重生	
2012		接力追凶	
2025	Gezhi Town	得闲谨制	

=== As cinematographer ===
Year	English title	Chinese title	Director	Notes
1990	Confucius	孔子	Zhang Jianxin/ Liu Ziyun	
1992	Story of the Street	杀人街的故事	Wang Ping	
1993	Romance in Manchuria	情系满洲里		
1994	Kong Fansen	孔繁森	Wang Wenjie	
1996		爱情帮你办	Wang Ping	
1996	Army Wives	军嫂		
1996	Sister Gan Nineteen	甘十九妹	Wang Wenjie	
1997	The Formations of the Red Cross	红十字方队	Wang Wenjie	
1998	The Art of War and Thirty-Six Stratagems	孙子兵法与三十六计	Zhang Zhisheng/ Zhang Huili	
1998	Police 110	警方110	Kong Bo/ himself	
1998	The Holy Flame on the Sea	海上圣火	Qian Xiaohong/ himself	
1998	Daughter of Ali Mountain	阿里山的女儿		

== Film and TV Awards ==
Year	Nominated work	Award	Category	Result	Notes
2013	Legend of Entrepreneurship	19th Shanghai Television Festival	Best Director	Won	
2013	Legend of Entrepreneurship	29th Flying Apsaras Awards	Outstanding Director	Nominated	
2014	Romance of Our Parents	20th Shanghai Television Festival	Best Director	Nominated	
2015	All Quiet in Peking	21st Shanghai Television Festival	Best Director	Nominated	
2015	Romance of Our Parents; All Quiet in Peking; Nirvana in Fire	30th Flying Apsaras Awards	Outstanding Director	Won	
2016	Nirvana in Fire	22nd Shanghai Television Festival	Best Director	Won	
2016	Nirvana in Fire	3rd Asia Rainbow TV Awards	Best Television Director	Nominated	
2016	Nirvana in Fire	28th China TV Golden Eagle Awards	Best Director	Nominated	
2017	Ode to Joy	23rd Shanghai Television Festival	Best Director	Nominated	
2018	Nirvana in Fire 2	24th Shanghai Television Festival	Best Director	Nominated	
2019	Like a Flowing River	25th Shanghai Television Festival	Best Director	Won	
2020	Like a Flowing River	30th China TV Golden Eagle Awards	Best Director	Won	
2020	Like a Flowing River	32nd Flying Apsaras Awards	Outstanding Director	Nominated	
2021	Minning Town	27th Shanghai Television Festival	Best Director	Nominated	
