= 21st Shanghai Television Festival =

Chinese TV awards ceremony in 2015

The 21st Shanghai Television Festival (simplified Chinese: 第21届上海电视节; traditional Chinese: 第21屆上海電視節) ceremony was held in Shanghai, China on June 12, 2015.

== Winners and nominees ==
Best Television Series	Best Director
All Quiet in Peking; Red Sorghum; Hey, Old Man!; The Chinese Old Peasant; Deng Xiaoping at History's Crossroads; Ma Xiangyang Goes to the Countryside; Ordinary World; Divorce Lawyers; A Servant of Two Masters	Mao Weining–Ordinary World; Kong Sheng and Li Xue–All Quiet in Peking; Wu Ziniu–Deng Xiaoping at History's Crossroads; Yang Yazhou–Hey, Old Man!; Zheng Xiaolong–Red Sorghum
Best Actor	Best Actress
Chen Baoguo–The Chinese Old Peasant; Huang Lei–Hey, Old Man!; Wang Lei–Ordinary World; Wu Xiubo–Ma Xiangyang Goes to the Countryside; Zhu Yawen–Red Sorghum	Zhou Xun–Red Sorghum; Niu Li–The Chinese Old Peasant; Tong Liya–Ordinary World; Yan Ni–A Servant of Two Masters; Yao Chen–Divorce Lawyers
Best Supporting Actor	Best Supporting Actress
Feng Yuanzheng–The Chinese Old Peasant; William Chan–Swords of Legends; Hu Ge–Forty Nine Days: Memorial; Huang Xuan–Red Sorghum; Ni Dahong–All Quiet in Peking	Qin Hailu–Red Sorghum; He Saifei–Woman in a Family of Swordsman; Huo Siyan–Strawhat Police; Maggie Jiang–A Servant of Two Masters; Rulu Jiang–The Chinese Old Peasant
Best Variety Show	Best Art Direction
Chinese Character Dictation Contest; You Are the One; Tonight 80's Talk Show; Jin Xing Show; Voice; Happy Camp; Day Day Up; I am Speaker; Lok Street; Who's Still Standing	I am a Singer (Season 3); Dad, Where Are We Going? (Season 2); Running Man (Season 1); Amazing Chinese (Season 1); Divas hit the road (Season 1); The Legendary Swordsman (Season 1); First Grade (Season 1); Sing My Song (season 2); The Voice of China (season 3); Super Brain (Season 2)
Best Writer	
Liu Heping–All Quiet in Peking; Chen Tong–A Servant of Two Masters; Gao Mantang and Li Zhou–The Chinese Old Peasant; Long Pingping/ Zhang Qiang/ Huang Yazhou/ Wei Ren–Deng Xiaoping at History's Crossroads; Zhao Dongling/ Guan Xiaoxiao/ Pan Geng–Red Sorghum	
