= Ode to Joy (TV series) =

2016 Chinese television series

- Season 2 promotional image
- Genre: Drama; Slice-of-life; Romance
- Created by: Shanghai Media Group
- Written by: Yuan Zidan
- Directed by: Kong Sheng (Season 1); Jian Chuanhe (Season 1-2); Zhang Kaizhou (Season 2)
- Starring: Liu Tao; Jiang Xin; Wang Ziwen; Yang Zi; Qiao Xin
- Opening theme: Various renditions of Beethoven's Ode to Joy
- Ending theme: There Will Be Happiness Waiting for You (Season 1); Us (Season 2)
- Country of origin: China
- Original language: Chinese
- No. of seasons: 5
- No. of episodes: 42 (Season 1); 55 (Season 2); 33 (Season 3); 37 (Season 4); 34 (Season 5)

Production
- Producer: Hou Hongliang
- Running time: 45 minutes (approx.)
- Production companies: Shandong Film & TV Production Co., Ltd. (Season 1); Daylight Entertainment Television Ltd (Season 1-2)

Original release
- Network: Dragon Television; Zhejiang Television
- Release: 18 April 2016 – present

Ode to Joy (simplified Chinese: 欢乐颂; traditional Chinese: 歡樂頌) is a 2016 Chinese television series jointly produced by Shandong Television Media Group and Daylight Entertainment Television Ltd. It is based on the same title novel by A Nai. The first season of the drama aired from 18 April to 10 May 2016.

The second season of the drama aired from 11 May to 10 June 2017. The 3rd and 4th season were released in 2022 and 2023 respectively. The main characters and their actors have been changed from Season 3.

== Synopsis ==
The series is about five modern women who live on the 22nd floor of an apartment complex called "Ode to Joy" in Shanghai. Each with their unique personality and lifestyle, the five women have different backgrounds, including their age, social status, personality and careers. Their relationships were initially rocky, but eventually they became good friends and neighbours. Together, they navigate their career and love lives, solving problems and growing more resilient.

== Seasons ==
| Seasons | Episodes | Originally released | | |
| Seasons | Episodes | First released | Last released | Network |
|---|---|---|---|---|
| 1 | 42 | April 18, 2016 | May 10, 2016 | Dragon TV, Zhejiang TV |
| 2 | 55 | May 11, 2017 | June 10, 2017 | Dragon TV, Zhejiang TV |
| 3 | 33 | August 11, 2022 | August 31, 2022 | Dragon TV |
| 4 | 37 | April 7, 2023 | April 26, 2023 | CCTV-8 |
| 5 | 34 | March 16, 2024 | April 1, 2024 | CCTV-8 |

== Cast ==
=== Main ===
| Actress | Role | Appearance | | Description |
| Actress | Role | 1 | 2 | |
| Liu Tao | Andy | Main | Main | 31 years old; a Wall Street executive who returns to China in search of her long-lost brother. Despite her intelligence, Andy is not good at dealing with relationships. Her lonely childhood as an orphan and battle with a hereditary mental disorder fills her life with worry. |
| Jiang Xin | Fan Shengmei | Main | Main | 30 years old; a senior HR executive at a foreign company. She is resourceful, worldly and kind-hearted. Facing constant extortion from her financially strained family, Fan Shengmei puts great importance on money and superficial needs whilst battling her insecurities. |
| Wang Ziwen | Qu Xiaoxiao | Main | Main | 24 years old; daughter of a rich businessman. She is honest, sassy and fierce. Despite being raised in a complex family. Qu Xiaoxiao is caring, she is a rose with thorns, making people love her and hate her at the same time. |
| Yang Zi | Qiu Yingying | Main | Main | 23 years old; a regular employee who comes to Shanghai from a small city to seek better endeavours. She is straightforward and simple, but she also has a bad temper. Her impulsiveness gets hers into sticky situations. |
| Qiao Xin | Guan Juner | Main | Main | 22 years old; an intern at a global top 500 company who strives to catch up with her fellow peers due to her inferior educational background. Coming from an academic family, she is quiet, introverted and gentle. As she enters the workplace and meets different people, Guan Juner starts to question her identity and aspirations. |

=== Supporting ===
| Actor | Role | Appearance | | Description |
| Actor | Role | 1 | 2 | |
| Zu Feng | Qi Dian | Main | Guest | A shrewd and capable CEO who builds his career from scratch. He is cautious and on-guard of the people around him. He is long-time online friends with Andy, and is also her first love. However, he made a mistake trying to resolve her personal problems that their relationship ends up falling apart. |
| Wang Kai | Zhao Qiping | Main | Main | A chief physician at a renowned hospital known for his exemplary educational background and immaculate work attitude. When he is off-work, he displays his charismatic and flirtatious nature. He has an on-and-off relationship with Qu Xiaoxiao until he realizes they want to be exclusive. |
| Jin Dong | Tan Zongming | Guest | Guest | A legendary figure in Shanghai's business world. Andy's boss and long-time friend who truly cares for her and helps her find her brother. |
| Yang Shuo | Bao Yifan | Guest | Main | A second generation rich heir and vice president of his family's company. Though he may seem frivolous on the outside, he is earnest and persistent, both in work and love. He later becomes Andy's second boyfriend. |
| Zhang Lu | Wang Baichuan | Main | Main | A hardworking businessman who founded a start-up. He has had a crush on Shengmei since their university days, and when he hears that she is still single, he decides to pursue her. He is someone willing to go the extra mile for love, but Fan Shengmei's relentless demands make him feel inadequate. |
| Wu Haochen | Ying Qin | Guest | Main | A hardworking and simple man who works as an IT employee. He comes from the same hometown as Qiu Yingying, and later becomes her boyfriend. However, his traditional view towards relationships put their romance in peril once he finds out that Yingying isn't a virgin. |
| Deng Lun | Xie Tong | | Main | A rising musician in his early twenties. He was expelled from his highschool in his teenage years and as a result he never went to University and is uneducated. He meets Guan Ju'er after a misunderstanding between him and Yingying. He later becomes Guan Juner's boyfriend. |

=== Extended ===
==== Family members ====
| Actor | Role | Appearance | | Description |
| Actor | Role | 1 | 2 | |
| Su Shenghua | He Yunli | | Guest | Andy's grandfather who passes away. |
| Ding Yongdai | Wei Guoqiang | Regular | Regular | Andy's father. |
| Dai Meihong | Andy's mother | Guest | | |
| Shi Yunpeng | Xiao Ming | Regular | Regular | An dy's brother who suffers from a mental disorder. |
| Zhang Naihua | Fan Shengmei's father | Regular | Regular | He was diagnosed with a sickness and as a result Fan Shengmei had to sell her brother's house. |
| Kang Junzhi | Fan Shengmei's mother | Regular | Regular | She is always biased towards Fan Shengmei's brother thus always begging Fan Shengmei to help her brother and his wife. |
| Yue Yang | Fan Shengying | Regular | Regular | He is a Fan Shengmei's brother who is a troublemaker who ownes money to a lot of people. He is constantly asking for money from his sister. |
| Zhao Qianzi | Fan Shengmei's sister-in-law | Regular | Regular | Fan Shengying's wife |
| Yang Yicheng | Lei Lei | Regular | Regular | Fan Shengmei's nephew and Fan Shengying's son. |
| Wang Yongquan | Qu Xiaoxiao's father | Regular | Regular | A rich business man. He and his wife disagree on matters regarding money. |
| Mu Liyan | Qu Xiaoxiao's mother | Regular | Regular | She is a straightforward women who cares and looks out for her daughter. |
| Guo Xiaoran | Qu Lianjie | Regular | Regular | Qu Xiaoxiao's older half-brother. A rich man with many relationships including Fan Shengmei. |
| Feng Hui | Qiu Yingying's father | Regular | Regular | |
| Yan Jingyao | Qiu Yingying's mother | | Regular | |
| Tan Xihe | Guan Juner's father | Regular | Regular | |
| Liu Mintao | Guan Juner's mother | Regular | Regular | She is always advising her daughter to look for a boyfriend and openly discusses the disadvantages Guan Juner and Xie Tong's relationship have after figuring out he did not go to University. |
| Chang Chen-kuang | Bao Yifan's father | | Regular | |
| Juan Zi | Bao Yifan's mother | | Regular | She disapproved of Andy and Bao Yifan's relationship at first but has a change of heart after she was admitted to the hospital. |
| Chen Jin | Zhao Qiping's mother | | Regular | |
| Cai Gang | Wang Baichuan's father | | Regular | |
| Li Xiaoyan | Wang Baichuan's mother | | Regular | She disapproves of Fan Shengmei and Wang Baichuan's relationship due to Fan Shengmei's complicated family matters and believed she would be a burden to her son. |
| Cao Yi | Ying Qin's father | | Regular | |
| Yang Kun | Ying Qin's mother | | Regular | She originally disapproved of Qiu Yingying and Ying Qin's relationship, but approves it after an incident with Yin Qin's ex-fiancée. |

==== Others ====
| Actor | Role | Appearance | | Description |
| Actor | Role | 1 | 2 | |
| Zhang Xiaoqian | Yao Bin | Regular | Regular | Qu Xiaoxiao's good friend. A rich boy who loves to party. |
| Wang Wenshi | Lan Lan | Regular | Regular | One of Qu Xiaoxiao's entourage. |
| Hu Yijing | Kong Kong | Regular | Regular | One of Qu Xiaoxiao's entourage. |
| Chen Muyang | Chief Bai | Guest | | Qiu Yingying's deceiving ex-boyfriend and colleague. He planned on playing Qiu Yingying and tried to falsely report Fan Shengmei to the police for destroying his property. He also tried to prevent Yingying from working correctly at the office, they both eventually get laid off after Yingying exposes his misdeeds. He does encounter her again when they were both looking for jobs, but her slaps her and storms off and she publicly accused him of being evil. |
| Yu Wentong | Yan Luming | Guest | Guest | Tan Zongming's good friend. |
| Wang Hong | Lin Jing | Regular | | Guan Juner's senior and pursuer. |
| Liu Lin | Xiu Yuan | Regular | Regular | Hospital director who helps take care of Xiao Ming. |
| Li Kewei | Liu Siming | Regular | | An Di's employee. A careless and scatter-brained man who focuses more on investing in stocks than on work. |
| Li Shuai | Guan Dayu | Regular | | An Di's employee. |
| Yuan Yuan | Zhang Lili | Regular | | An Di's employee. |
| Sui Yumeng | Mi Xue'er | Regular | | Guan Juner's fellow intern. |
| Zhu Mengyao | Xiao Ye | Regular | | Guan Juner's fellow intern. |
| Li Xueting | Ah Guan Nan | Guest | | Qu Xiaoxiao's former classmate. She wanted to seduce Qi Dian, and was jealous of his relationship with An Di thus she framed An Di to be a third party. She was eventually exposed and was threatened to publicly apologize by Qu Xiaoxiao. |
| Wei Wei | Xiao Nan | Guest | | A debtor who extorted hospital bills from Fan Shengmei. |
| Johnny Chen | Chen Jiakang | | Guest | Fan Shengmei's admirer. |
| Jin Zehao | Shu Zhan | | Guest | Guan Juner's matchmaking partner. |
| Lu Ling | Mrs. Wei | | Guest | Wei Guoqiang's wife. She accused An Di of having an affair with her husband due to being unaware that An Di was her husband's daughter and slapped An Di as well as contact Bao Yifan's mom to further push An Di in a corner. |

== Soundtrack ==
=== Season One ===
| Title | Singer |
|---|---|
| "说不出口" (Can't Say It Aloud) | Liu Tao |
| "灰姑娘" (Cinderella) | Jiang Xin |
| "我要你" (I Want You) | Wang Ziwen |
| "开的比花香" (More Fragrant Than Flowers) | Yang Zi |
| "破茧" (Breaking out of the Cocoon) | Bridgette Qiao |
| "陪你左右" (Staying By Your Side) | Zu Feng |
| "空气" (Air) | Zu Feng |
| "你我" (You and Me) | Yang Shuo |
| "爱情这样开始" (Love Begins Like This) | Zhang Jiang |
| "欢乐颂" (Ode to Joy) | Zhang Jiang |
| "繁星" (Array of Stars) | Zhang Jiang |
| "总有幸福在等你" (There Will Be Happiness Waiting for You) | Liu Tao, Jiang Xin, Wang Ziwen, Yang Zi, Bridgette Qiao |

=== Season Two ===
| Title | Singer | Notes |
|---|---|---|
| "我们“ (Us) | Liu Tao, Jiang Xin, Wang Ziwen, Yang Zi, Bridgette Qiao | Theme song |
| "家的滋味" (The Feeling of Home) | Liu Tao | An Di's theme song |
| "遇到爱“ (Meeting Love) | Liu Tao | An Di's theme song |
| "不怕一个人" (Not Afraid to be Alone) | Jiang Xin | Fan Shengmei's theme song |
| "我管可爱你管帅" (I'm Cute, You're Handsome) | Wang Ziwen | Qu Xiaoxiao's theme song |
| "蚯蚓" (Earthworm) | Yang Zi | Qiu Yingying's theme song |
| "想做你的瘋女孩" (I Want To Be Your Crazy Girl) | Bridgette Qiao | Guan Ju'er's theme song |
| "吻你之时别再躲" (Don't Hide When I Kiss You) | Yang Shuo | Bao Yifan's theme song |
| "愛我所愛" (Love What I Love) | Deng Lun | Xie Tong's theme song |
| "咖哩咖哩" (Curry Curry) | Milk Coffee | |
| "天已黑" (Night Has Fallen) | Aska Yang | |
| "天已黑" (Night Has Fallen) | Deng Lun & Li Yang | Version 2 |
| "音樂帶我解脫" (Music Brings Me Relief) | Xu Hebin | |
| "只要你一個" (I Only Want You) | Dongdong Dong | |
| "逆光飛翔" (Fly Against the Light) | Xu Hebin | |
| "錯愛" (Wrong Love) | Quan Zhendong | |
| "錯過" (Let Slip) | Su Lisheng | |

== Reception ==
=== Critical reception ===
After airing, Ode to Joy received positive reviews from critics. People's Daily considered the series as a "new style of modern drama" which caters to women. The series has also been praised for breaking away from the cookie-cutter nature of TV dramas that often feature a pure and kind-hearted Cinderella-like figure as its protagonist; and for injecting a new lease of life into the domestic TV drama industry. Hailed as China's answer to Sex and the City, the drama has been praised for its realistic story and characters which viewers were able to empathize with. Sohu commented that Ode to Joy reveals the hardships that exist underneath the surface of shiny metro life, while also exploring different social rungs. Another success factor was due to its high production quality which showcases China's modern developments.

Conversely, the series has also been criticized for encouraging the worship of wealth and leading audiences to become immersed in a world of pure illusion. The second season of the drama was also criticized for its repetitive plot, merely having a rating of 5.3 on Douban. Additionally, it was further panned for its materialist message. The series has also caused heated discussion about "virgin obsession" on social media platforms.

=== Commercial reception ===
Ode to Joy is a hit with both domestic and overseas viewers. The first season of the drama has over 18.3 billion views as of December 2016, becoming the most watched contemporary drama in China, before being surpassed by Love O2O. The total number of views on YouTube also reached over 50 million, surpassing the record previously set by Nirvana in Fire and Princess Agents.

The second season of the drama is also commercially successful, with over 1 percent viewership ratings in China and has acquired a strong international following.

=== Ratings ===
==== First season ====
| Broadcast date | Episode | Zhejiang TV CSM52 ratings | | | Dragon TV CSM52 ratings | | |
| Broadcast date | Episode | Ratings(%) | Audience share (%) | Rank | Ratings (%) | Audience share(%) | Rank |
|---|---|---|---|---|---|---|---|
| 2016.4.18 | 1-2 | 0.492 | 1.43 | 12 | 0.567 | 1.64 | 9 |
| 2016.4.19 | 3-4 | 0.612 | 1.70 | 10 | 0.729 | 2.01 | 7 |
| 2016.4.20 | 5-6 | 0.580 | 1.61 | 10 | 0.780 | 2.16 | 7 |
| 2016.4.21 | 7-8 | 0.593 | 1.71 | 11 | 0.753 | 2.15 | 7 |
| 2016.4.22 | 9-10 | 0.808 | 2.25 | 8 | 0.844 | 2.33 | 7 |
| 2016.4.23 | 11 | 0.926 | 2.72 | 4 | 0.984 | 2.89 | 3 |
| 2016.4.24 | 12-13 | 0.885 | 2.54 | 4 | 1.102 | 3.05 | 3 |
| 2016.4.25 | 14-15 | 0.897 | 2.58 | 4 | 0.983 | 2.86 | 2 |
| 2016.4.26 | 16-17 | 0.912 | 2.58 | 7 | 0.993 | 2.79 | 4 |
| 2016.4.27 | 18-19 | 0.919 | 2.67 | 5 | 1.040 | 3.01 | 3 |
| 2016.4.28 | 20-21 | 0.826 | 2.43 | 7 | 0.962 | 2.82 | 5 |
| 2016.4.29 | 22-23 | 0.976 | 2.84 | 3 | 1.126 | 3.24 | 1 |
| 2016.4.30 | 24 | 0.833 | 2.61 | 5 | 0.862 | 2.71 | 4 |
| 2016.5.01 | 25-26 | 0.913 | 2.9 | 3 | 1.29 | 3.92 | 1 |
| 2016.5.02 | 27-28 | 1.262 | 3.514 | 2 | 1.513 | 4.205 | 1 |
| 2016.5.03 | 29-30 | 1.236 | 3.590 | 4 | 1.383 | 4.020 | 2 |
| 2016.5.04 | 31-32 | 1.298 | 3.801 | 2 | 1.524 | 4.474 | 1 |
| 2016.5.05 | 33-34 | 1.304 | 3.791 | 3 | 1.672 | 4.854 | 1 |
| 2016.5.06 | 35-36 | 1.349 | 3.95 | 2 | 1.748 | 5.1 | 1 |
| 2016.5.07 | 37 | 1.274 | 3.76 | 2 | 1.68 | 4.96 | 1 |
| 2016.5.08 | 38-39 | 1.11 | 3.32 | 3 | 1.928 | 5.54 | 1 |
| 2016.5.09 | 40-41 | 1.258 | 3.562 | 3 | 1.930 | 5.451 | 1 |
| 2016.5.10 | 42 | 1.331 | 3.69 | 2 | 1.972 | 5.48 | 1 |
| Average ratings | | 0.982 | | | 1.233 | | |

==== Second season ====
| Broadcast date | Dragon TV ratings | | | Zhejiang TV ratings | | |
| Broadcast date | Ratings | Audience share | Rank | Ratings | Audience share | Rank |
|---|---|---|---|---|---|---|
| 2017-5-11 | 1.342 | 4.438 | 2 | 1.549 | 5.122 | 1 |
| 2017-5-12 | 1.351 | 4.49 | 2 | 1.925 | 6.4 | 1 |
| 2017-5-13 | 1.224 | 4.22 | 2 | 1.446 | 5 | 1 |
| 2017-5-15 | 1.352 | 4.46 | 2 | 1.517 | 5.019 | 1 |
| 2017-5-16 | 1.438 | 4.94 | 2 | 1.518 | 5.225 | 1 |
| 2017-5-17 | 1.397 | 4.842 | 1 | 1.396 | 4.833 | 2 |
| 2017-5-18 | 1.34 | 4.637 | 2 | 1.464 | 5.065 | 1 |
| 2017-5-19 | 1.43 | 4.81 | 2 | 1.489 | 5.05 | 1 |
| 2017-5-20 | 1.261 | 4.45 | 2 | 1.372 | 4.83 | 1 |
| 2017-5-21 | 1.597 | 5.21 | 2 | 1.694 | 5.52 | 1 |
| 2017-5-22 | 1.549 | 4.927 | 2 | 1.648 | 5.255 | 1 |
| 2017-5-23 | 1.582 | 5.18 | 2 | 1.63 | 5.333 | 1 |
| 2017-5-24 | 1.592 | 5.31 | 1 | 1.563 | 5.2 | 2 |
| 2017-5-25 | 1.516 | 5.32 | 1 | 1.495 | 5.24 | 2 |
| 2017-5-26 | 1.558 | 5.36 | 1 | 1.555 | 5.4 | 2 |
| 2017-5-27 | 1.36 | 4.9 | 1 | 1.271 | 4.63 | 2 |
| 2017-5-28 | 1.495 | 5.17 | 2 | 1.542 | 5.33 | 1 |
| 2017-5-29 | 1.583 | 5.53 | 2 | 1.611 | 5.61 | 1 |
| 2017-5-30 | 1.688 | 5.626 | 2 | 1.694 | 5.648 | 1 |
| 2017-5-31 | 1.645 | 5.514 | 2 | 1.798 | 6.017 | 1 |
| 2017-6-1 | 1.647 | 5.695 | 2 | 1.667 | 5.771 | 1 |
| 2017-6-2 | 1.681 | 5.62 | 2 | 1.803 | 6.05 | 1 |
| 2017-6-3 | 1.331 | 4.58 | 2 | 1.742 | 6 | 1 |
| 2017-6-4 | 1.986 | 6.31 | 1 | 1.919 | 6.1 | 2 |
| 2017-6-5 | 1.955 | 6.323 | 1 | 1.705 | 5.519 | 2 |
| 2017-6-6 | 1.842 | 6.251 | 1 | 1.725 | 5.859 | 2 |
| 2017-6-7 | 1.824 | 6.361 | 1 | 1.608 | 5.6 | 2 |
| 2017-6-8 | 2.017 | 7.101 | 1 | 1.55 | 5.452 | 2 |
| 2017-6-9 | 1.904 | 6.168 | 1 | 1.695 | 5.811 | 2 |
| 2017-6-10 | 1.793 | 6.489 | 1 | 1.467 | 5.317 | 2 |

- Highest ratings are marked in red, lowest ratings are marked in blue

=== Awards and nominations ===
| Year | Award | Category | Nominated work | Result | Ref. |
|---|---|---|---|---|---|
| 2016 | 7th Macau International Television Festival | Best Television Series | Ode to Joy | Won | |
| 2017 | 11th National Top-Notch Television Production Award Ceremony | Outstanding Television Series | Ode to Joy | Won | |
| 2017 | 2nd China Quality Television Drama Ceremony | Quality Drama Example of the Year | Ode to Joy | Won | |
| 2017 | 2nd China Quality Television Drama Ceremony | Audience Favorite TV Series (Dragon TV) | Ode to Joy | Won | |
| 2017 | 2nd China Quality Television Drama Ceremony | Quality Ensemble of the Year | Liu Tao, Jiang Xin, Wang Ziwen, Yang Zi, Bridgette Qiao | Won | |
| 2017 | 2nd China Quality Television Drama Ceremony | Audience's Favorite Quality Star | Liu Tao | Won | |
| 2017 | 2nd China Quality Television Drama Ceremony | Most Improved Actors of the Year | Wang Ziwen, Yang Shuo | Won | |
| 2017 | 2nd China Quality Television Drama Ceremony | Quality Producer of the Year | Hou Hongliang (also for When a Snail Falls in Love) | Won | |
| 2017 | 22nd Huading Awards | Best Director | Kong Sheng, Jian Chuanhe | Nominated | |
| 2017 | 22nd Huading Awards | Best Screenwriter | Yuan Zidan | Nominated | |
| 2017 | 22nd Huading Awards | Best Actress | Liu Tao | Nominated | |
| 2017 | 22nd Huading Awards | Best Actress (Contemporary) | Jiang Xin | Nominated | |
| 2017 | 22nd Huading Awards | Best Supporting Actor | Zu Feng | Nominated | |
| 2017 | 22nd Huading Awards | Best Supporting Actress | Wang Ziwen | Nominated | |
| 2017 | 22nd Huading Awards | Top 10 Television Series | Ode to Joy | Won | |
| 2017 | 23rd Shanghai Television Festival | Best Television Series | Ode to Joy | Nominated | |
| 2017 | 23rd Shanghai Television Festival | Best Director | Kong Sheng, Jian Chuanhe | Nominated | |
| 2017 | 23rd Shanghai Television Festival | Best Writing | Yuan Zidan | Nominated | |
| 2017 | 23rd Shanghai Television Festival | Best Actress | Liu Tao | Nominated | |
| 2017 | 23rd Shanghai Television Festival | Best Actress | Jiang Xin | Nominated | |
| 2017 | 23rd Shanghai Television Festival | Best Supporting Actor | Jin Dong | Nominated | |
| 2017 | 23rd Shanghai Television Festival | Best Supporting Actress | Wang Ziwen | Nominated | |
| 2017 | 23rd Shanghai Television Festival | Best Supporting Actress | Yang Zi | Nominated | |
| 2017 | 8th Macau International Television Festival | Best Actress | Liu Tao | Nominated | |
| 2017 | 8th Macau International Television Festival | Best Supporting Actress | Wang Ziwen | Nominated | |
| 2018 | 31st Flying Apsaras Award | Outstanding Television Series (Modern) | Ode to Joy | Won | |
| 2018 | 31st Flying Apsaras Award | Outstanding Actress | Liu Tao | Nominated | |
| 2018 | 31st Flying Apsaras Award | Outstanding Actress | Jiang Xin | Nominated | |
| 2018 | 29th China TV Golden Eagle Award | Best Actress | Liu Tao | Nominated | |
| 2018 | 29th China TV Golden Eagle Award | Best Actress | Yang Zi | Nominated | |

== International broadcast ==
=== Season One ===
| Channel | Location | Date |
|---|---|---|
| Dragon Television | China | 18 April 2016 |
| Zhejiang Television | China | 18 April 2016 |
| Shandong Television | China | 24 May 2016 |
| Jiangxi Television | China | 27 June 2016 |
| Jia Le Channel (Singtel TV 502) | Singapore | 1 September 2016 |
| Videoland ON TV | Taiwan | 21 September 2016 |
| ELTA Drama | Taiwan | 6 October 2016 |
| NTV7 (Astro 107) | Malaysia | 27 October 2016 |
| 8TV (Astro 708) | Malaysia | 8 July 2017 |
| Guangdong Television | China | 27 June 2017 |
| Vietnam Television (VTV3) | Vietnam | 8 November 2017 |
| TVB | Hong Kong | 21 January 2018 (TVB Chinese Drama) |
| Rupavahini | Sri Lanka | 8 May 2018 |
| CGTN Spanish | Spain | 1 January 2021 |
| Rede Brasil | Brazil | 14 March 2022 |
| Vĩnh Long Radio - Television Station | Vietnam | 19 February 2025 |

=== Season Two ===
| Channel | Location | Date |
|---|---|---|
| Dragon Television | China | 11 May 2017 |
| Zhejiang Television | China | 11 May 2017 |
| Astro Quan Jia HD (Astro 308) | Malaysia | 24 April 2017 |
| Tianjin Television | China | 27 July 2017 |
| Jia Le Channel (Singtel TV 502) | Singapore | 25 September 2017 |
| Videoland ON TV | Taiwan | 27 September 2017 |
| ELTA Drama | Taiwan | 2 October 2017 |
| Southeast Television | China | 19 February 2018 |
| TVB | Hong Kong | 17 May 2018 |

=== Season Three ===
| Channel | Location | Date |
|---|---|---|
| Dragon Television | China | 11 August 2022 |
| Vietnam Television (VTV3) | Vietnam | 17 June 2025 |
