= The Eye of the Dragon Princess =

2020 Chinese film

- A theatrical poster for "The Eye Of The Dragon Princess" film
- Long Wu Mu
- Directed by: Liu Tao
- Written by: Pu Songling
- Story by: Strange Tales from a Liaozhai
- Based on: Strange Tales from a Liaozhai
- Starring: Nicole Zhu; Peer Zhu; Sherman Ye; Meng Ziye; Olivia Yan; He Yin; Xu Xiaoqin; Chen Yue; Yang Qiyu
- Production companies: Beijing Oriental Feiyun International Film and Television Co., Ltd.
- Distributed by: Beijing Oriental Feiyun International Film and Television Co., Ltd.
- Release date: 28 August 2020
- Running time: 87 minutes
- Country: China
- Language: Mandarin

The Eye of the Dragon Princess

Chinese name
- Traditional Chinese: 龍無目
- Simplified Chinese: 龙无目
- Literal meaning: dragon without eyes
Transcriptions
Standard Mandarin
- Hanyu Pinyin: Lóng wú mù

Meitei name
- Meitei: ꯆꯤꯡꯂꯥꯏ ꯃꯆꯥꯏꯕꯦꯝꯃꯒꯤ ꯃꯃꯤꯠ (ching-lai ma-chaa-ee-bem-ma-gee ma-meet)

The Eye of the Dragon Princess, also known as Long Wu Mu (Chinese: 龙无目, Lóng wú mù, lit. dragon without eyes), is a 2020 Chinese fantasy film, directed by Liu Tao, produced by Beijing Oriental Feiyun International Film and Television Co., Ltd., starring Zhu Sheng Yi and Peer Zhu in lead roles. The film is adapted from Pu Songling's short story "Strange Tales from a Liaozhai", about the story of a drought in Xinzhou, the rain in "Sea Dragon Ball", and the love affairs of the dragon princess with "Lu Haisheng", a government official.

== Plot ==
Hai Lanzhu, the dragon princess, has the powers to order the water of the Tianhe to rain. She came to the human world with the task of causing rainfall. In the Dragon King Temple, she met Lu Haisheng, who came to solve a case. The two fell in love with each other. However, her precious eyes, became the prey for others in the selfish world. Even her lover was also pushed into the whirlpool of conspiracy because of her. After all, she defied the odds in the end.

== Cast ==
- Nicole Zhu as the Dragon Princess named "Hai Lanzhu"
- Peer Zhu as Lu Haisheng, Detective
- Sherman Ye as Xie Yun, Crab
- Meng Ziye as Rabbit Demon
- Olivia Yan as Yu He
- He Yin as Mother Lu
- Xu Xiaoqin as Tree God
- Chen Yue as Qing Qing
- Yang Qiyu as the Official
