= 22nd Huading Awards =

2017 entertainment awards

- Date: May 18, 2017

The 22nd Huading Awards ceremony was held on May 18, 2017, at Suzhou.

== Nominations and winners ==
Complete list of nominees and winners (denoted in bold)

Best Director	Best Screenwriter
**Wang Jun** – **A Love For Separation**; Zhang Li – Young Marshal; Kong Sheng, Jian Chuanhe – Ode to Joy; Yu Chun – Women Must be Stronger; Zhang Xiaobo – To Be a Better Man	**Li Xiao, Yu Miao, Zhang Yingji** – **To Be a Better Man**; He Qing – A Love For Separation; Yuan Zidan – Ode to Joy; Jiang Qitao – Young Marshal; Xue Xiaolu, Wang Yue, Zhang Gaoxing – Keep the Marriage as Jade
Best Actor	Best Actress
~~**Li Yifeng** – **Noble Aspirations**~~ (Rescinded in September 2022); Sun Honglei – To Be a Better Man; Huang Lei – A Love For Separation; Huang Xuan – The Interpreter; Chen Jianbin – Chinese Style Relationship	**Tiffany Tang** – **The Princess Weiyoung**; Hai Qing – A Love For Separation; Cecilia Liu – The Imperial Doctress; Zanilia Zhao – The Mystic Nine; Liu Tao – Ode to Joy
Best Actor (Ancient Drama)	Best Actress (Ancient Drama)
**Yuan Hong** – **Singing All Along**; Yan Yikuan – Treasure Raider; Chen Xiao – The Three Heroes and Five Gallants; Luo Jin – The Princess Weiyoung; Hans Zhang – The Classic of Mountains and Seas	**None**; Bobo Gan – Treasure Raider; Guli Nazha – Chinese Paladin 5; Zhang Xinyi – Princess Jieyou; Yang Zi – Noble Aspirations; Guan Xiaotong – Novoland: The Castle in the Sky
Best Actor (Revolutionary-Era Drama)	Best Actress (Revolutionary-Era Drama)
**Lu Yi** – **Rookie Agent Rouge**; Li Xuejian – Young Marshal; Chen Jianbin – The Identity of Father; Dong Yong – Marshal Peng Dehuai; Wu Gang – Man with No Name	**Ke Lan** – **Jin Shui Bridge**; Song Jia – Young Marshal; Zhou Dongyu – Sparrow; Faye Yu – The Identity of Father; Cao Xiwen – The 38th Parallel
Best Actor (Contemporary Drama)	Best Actress (Contemporary Drama)
**Xu Yajun** – **Keep the Marriage as Jade**; Guo Tao – We Are Still Married; Yang Le – May December Love 2; Yuan Hong – Let's Fall in Love; Zhu Yawen – Two Families	**Ma Su** – **We Are Still Married**; Jiang Shuying – To Be a Better Man; Faye Yu – May December Love 2; Jiang Xin – Ode to Joy; Zhang Jingchu – Let's Fall in Love
Best Supporting Actor	Best Supporting Actress
**Zhao Lixin** – **Chinese Style Relationship**; Wang Yaoqing – To Be a Better Man; Zhang Luyi – Sparrow; Ming Dao – Let's Fall in Love; Zu Feng – Ode to Joy	**Zhang Zifeng** – **A Love For Separation**; Wang Ziwen – Ode to Joy; Guan Xiaotong – To Be a Better Man; Zhang Meng – May December Love 2; Hu Ke – Chinese Style Relationship
Best Newcomer	Top 10 Dramas
**Tan Songyun** – **The Whirlwind Girl**; Zhang Xinyi – Young Marshal; Zhang Yixing – To Be a Better Man; Qin Junjie – Noble Aspirations; Vengo Gao – The Interpreter	**A Love for Separation**; To Be a Better Man; Young Marshal; The Interpreter; Chinese Style Relationship; The Mystic Nine; Noble Aspirations; Ode to Joy; The Imperial Doctress; When a Snail Falls in Love
