= Magnolia Award for Best Actor in a Television Series =

Annual award under the Shanghai Television Festival

Magnolia Award for Best Actor is awarded under the Shanghai Television Festival.

== 2020s ==
Year	Winner and nominees	English title	Original title
2026	Yu Hewei	Silent Honor	沉默的荣耀
2026	Guo Jingfei	Uncle	老舅
2026	Bai Yu	Swords Into Plowshares	太平年
2026	Hu Ge	Born to Be Alive	生命树
2026	Xiao Zhan	The Legend of Zang Hai	藏海传
2025	Jin Dong	Northwest Years	西北岁月
2025	Wang Baoqiang	Playing Go	棋士
2025	Wang Xiao	Born to Be the One	凡人歌
2025	Yu Hewei	We Are Criminal Police	我是刑警
2025	Zhang Ruoyun	Joy of Life 2	庆余年第二季
2024	Hu Ge	Blossoms Shanghai	繁花
2024	Fan Wei	The Long Season	漫长的季节
2024	Ding Yongdai	Always On the Move	南来北往
2024	Wang Renjun	The Forerunner	问苍茫
2024	Wang Yang	War of Faith	追风者
2022-2023	Lei Jiayin	A Lifelong Journey	人世间
2022-2023	Zhu Yilong	The Rebel	叛逆者
2022-2023	Guo Jingfei	Enemy	对手
2022-2023	Hu Ge	Bright Future	县委大院
2022-2023	Zhang Yi	The Knockout	狂飙
2021	Yu Hewei	Awakening Age	觉醒年代
2021	Wang Kai	Like a Flowing River 2	大江大河2
2021	Chen Jianbin	Trident	三叉戟
2021	Huang Xuan	Minning Town	山海情
2021	Zhang Jiayi	The Stage	装台
2020	Chen Baoguo	The Legendary Tavern	老酒馆
2020	Lei Jiayin	The Longest Day in Chang'an	长安十二时辰
2020	Zhang Ruoyun	Joy of Life	庆余年
2020	Sun Honglei	The New World	新世界
2020	Huang Lei	A Little Reunion	小欢喜

== 2010s ==
Year	Winner and nominees	English title	Original title
2019	Ni Dahong	All Is Well	都挺好
2019	Chen Kun	The Rise of Phoenixes	天盛长歌
2019	He Bing	Memories of Peking	芝麻胡同
2019	Wang Kai	Like a Flowing River	大江大河
2019	Zu Feng	The Mask	面具
2018	He Bing	The Love of Courtyard	情满四合院
2018	Hu Ge	Game of Hunting	猎场
2018	Lei Jiayin	The First Half of My Life	我的前半生
2018	Wu Xiubo	The Advisors Alliance	大军师司马懿之军师联盟
2018	Zhang Jiayi	White Deer Plain	白鹿原
2017	Zhang Yi	Feather Flies To The Sky	鸡毛飞上天
2017	Chen Jianbin	Chinese Style Relationship	中国式关系
2017	Huang Lei	A Love For Separation	小别离
2017	Sun Honglei	To Be a Better Man	好先生
2017	Mark Chao	Eternal Love	三生三世十里桃花
2016	Hu Ge	Nirvana in Fire	琅琊榜
2016	Wallace Huo	The Journey of Flower	花千骨
2016	Jin Dong	The Disguiser	伪装者
2016	Li Xuejian	Young Marshall	少帅
2016	Tong Dawei	Tiger Mom	虎妈猫爸
2015	Chen Baoguo	The Chinese Old Peasant	老农民
2015	Huang Lei	Hey Daddy	嘿，老头！
2015	Wang Lei	The Ordinary World	平凡的世界
2015	Wu Xiubo	A Civic Yuppie in Countryside	马向阳下乡记
2015	Zhu Yawen	Red Sorghum	红高粱
2014	Wang Zhiwen	May December Love	大丈夫
2014	Guo Tao	Romance of our Parents	父母爱情
2014	Li Xuejian	In the Name of Happiness	有你才幸福
2014	Pu Cunxin	See Without Looking	推拿
2014	Wei Zi	Dog Stick	巍子
2013	Zhang Jiayi	Fu Chen	浮沉
2013	Chen Baoguo	Zheng Zhe Wu Di	正者无敌
2013	Huang Bo	A Unique Militiman	民兵葛二蛋
2013	Wang Lei	The Happy Life of Jin Tai Lang	金太狼的幸福生活
2013	Wu Xiubo	Orphan of the Zhao Family	赵氏孤儿案
2012	Huang Haibo	Forever Designato	永不磨灭的番号
2012	Jiang Wu	Shi Yan Jin Sheng	誓言今生
2012	Wen Zhang	The Naked Wedding	裸婚时代
2012	Nicky Wu	Scarlet Heart	步步惊心
2012	Zhang Jiayi	The Brink	悬崖
2011	Zhang Jiayi	Borrow Gun	借枪
2011	Li Xuejian	Fu Shan Ru Ai	父爱如山
2011	Wayne Lai	No Regrets	巾帼枭雄之义海豪情
2011	Wen Zhang	Snow Leopard	雪豹
2011	Wu Xiubo	Before Dawn	黎明之前
2010	Huang Zhizhong	The Road We Have Taken	人间正道是沧桑
2010	Fan Wei	Brothers Happiness	老大的幸福
2010	Mark Chao	Black & White	痞子英雄
2010	Li Guangjie	Sha Hu Kou	杀虎口
2010	Wang Baoqiang	My Brother's Name is Shun Liu	我的兄弟叫顺溜

== 2000s ==
Year	Winner and nominees	English title	Original title
2009	Sun Honglei	Lurk	潜伏
2009	Feng Enhe	Lurk	潜伏
2009	Lin Yongjian	Wang Gui & Anna	王贵与安娜
2009	Duan Yihong	My Chief and My Regiment	我的团长我的团
2009	Yu Hewei	Wanton and Luxurious Living	纸醉金迷
2008	Zhang Guoli	Golden Marriage	金婚
2008	Liu Peiqi	Da Gong Jiang	大工匠
2008	Huang Lei	Home	家
2008	Li Guangjie	The Mission	特殊使命
2008	Huang Haibo	Pursue	追
2007	Sun Honglei	Halfway Couples	半路夫妻
2007	Leon Dai	The Hospital	白色巨塔
2007	Chen Chuang	Fu Gui	福贵
2007	Li Xuejian	Shanghai Bund	新上海滩
2007	Huang Xiaoming	Shanghai Bund	新上海滩
2006	Ray Winstone	Sweeney Todd	
2005	Richard Briers	Dad	
2004	Lin Ming-yuen	There's no tomorrow for us	我倆沒有明天
2001	Atsushi Itō	I'll be 18 tomorrow	僕はあした十八になる
2000	Lino Banfi	The Savior of San Nicola	Vola Sciusciù

== 1990s ==
Year	Winner and nominees	English title	Original title
1998	Christoph Waltz	Rache für mein totes Kind	
1996	Wang Zhiwen	Feels Like Spring	像春天一样
1994	Sun Min	Scorching Red Sun (Chi ri yanyan)	赤日炎炎
1992	Kanpei Hazama	New King (Shin Ōshō)	新王将
1990	James Woods	My Name Is Bill W.	

== 1980s ==
Year	Winner and nominees	English title	Original title
1988	Christopher Walken	Witness in the War Zone	
