= Wang Ziwen =

Chinese actress

- Born: 28 February 1987 (age 39); Chengdu, Sichuan, China
- Other names: Olivia Wang, Ava Wang
- Education: Central Academy of Drama
- Occupations: Actress; Model
- Years active: 2005–present
- Agent(s): Beijing Xinbaoyuan Film & Television Investment
- Children: 1

Chinese name
- Chinese: 王子文
Transcriptions
Standard Mandarin
- Hanyu Pinyin: Wáng Zǐwén

Wang Ziwen (Chinese: 王子文; pinyin: Wáng Zǐwén, born 28 February 1987), also known by her English name Olivia Wang and now as Ava Wang, is a Chinese actress. She is most known for portraying Qu Xiaoxiao in the popular Chinese television drama Ode to Joy and as Xuxu in When a Snail Falls in Love.

Wang ranked 87th on Forbes China Celebrity 100 list.

== Filmography ==
=== Film ===
Year	English title	Chinese title	Role	Notes
2006	The Postmodern Life of My Aunt	姨妈的后现代生活	Fei Fei	
2008	Dowry	嫁妆	Yin Sha	
2009	Visitors From The Sui Dynasty	隋朝来客	Yao Mengmeng	
2010	Driverless	无人驾驶	Zi Feiyu	Cameo
2010	Aftershock	唐山大地震	Xiao He	
2011	Cool Young	正·青春	Si Ya	
2011	1911	辛亥革命	Tang Manrou	
2011	Lee's Adventures	李献计历险记	Wang Qian	
2012	The Great Magician	大魔术师	Li Jiao	
2012	Back to 1942	一九四二	Xing Xing	
2013	Fall in Love	爱神来了	Su Xiaobei	
2016	Cock and Bull	追凶者也	Yang Shuhua	
2016	Time Zhu Xian	时光诛仙		
2019	Enter the Forbidden City	进京城		
2020	The Yin-Yang Master: Dream of Eternity	阴阳师: 晴雅集	Princess Zhangping	
TBA	The Perfect Blue	她杀	Fei Mingzhu	

=== Television series ===
Year	English title	Chinese title	Role	Notes
2006	Who Is My Father	谁是我爸爸	Duo Er	
2006	Cold Autumn	寒秋	Qiu Hong	
2007	The World of Dust	人间浮尘	Jing Ruo	
2007		夜郎王	Qing Suo	
2009	The Prince of Tennis 2	加油!网球王子	Lin Ying	
2009	Another Habit	再过把瘾		Cameo
2010	Heavy Fog	迷雾重重	Mei Min	
2010	Chang E	嫦娥	Jade Rabbit	
2010	Life Bridge	生死桥	Dandan	
2011	Family, Power N	家，N次方	Qi Qi	
2011	Men	男人帮	Xiao Xiao	
2012	Sea Mother	刺青海娘	Yi Ruyin	
2013	Love is not for Sale	棋逢对手	Xia Duoduo	
2014	The Young Doctor	青年医生	Lu Wei	
2016	Ode to Joy	欢乐颂	Qu Xiaoxiao	
2016	Double Horn	双刺	Wu Peixin	
2016	Growing Up Together	一起长大	Meng Xiaoxia	
2016	When a Snail Falls in Love	如果蜗牛有爱情	Xu Xu	
2017	Ode to Joy 2	欢乐颂2	Qu Xiaoxiao	
2017	Season Love	何所冬暖，何所夏凉	Jian Anjie	
2017	Stairway to Stardom	逆袭之星途璀璨	Herself	
2019	Bureau of Transformer	动物管理局	Wu Aiai	
2019	Second Time Its a Charm	第二次也很美	An An	
2020	God of Lost Fantasy	太古神王	Mo Qingcheng	
2020	Healer of Children	了不起的儿科医生	Jiao Jiaren	
2023	Three-Body	三体	Young Ye Wenjie	
TBA	Youth Without Seasons	青春无季	Ning Meng	
TBA	Goodbye, City of Las Vegas	别了，拉斯维加斯	Feng Er	

== Discography ==
=== Singles ===
Year	English title	Chinese title	Album	Notes
2016	"There Will Be Happiness Waiting For You"	总有幸福在等你	Ode to Joy OST	with Liu Tao, Jiang Xin, Yang Zi & Qiao Xin
2016	"I Want You"	我要你	Ode to Joy OST	
2016	"Time Renegades"	时光诛仙	Time Renegades OST	with Richie Jen
2017	"Us"	我们	Ode to Joy 2 OST	with Liu Tao, Jiang Xin, Yang Zi & Qiao Xin
2017	"I'm Cute, You're Handsome"	我管可爱你管帅	Ode to Joy 2 OST	

== Awards and nominations ==
Year	Award	Category	Nominated work	Result	Ref.
2016	19th Huading Awards	Top 10 Audience's Favorite TV Star	—N/a	Won	
2017	22nd Huading Awards	Best Supporting Actress	Ode to Joy	Nominated	
2017	23rd Shanghai Television Festival	Best Supporting Actress	Ode to Joy	Nominated	
2017	8th Macau International Television Festival	Best Supporting Actress	Ode to Joy 2	Nominated	
2018	Macau International Movie Festival	Best Supporting Actress	Enter the Forbidden City	Won	
2019	Golden Bud - The Fourth Network Film And Television Festival	Best Actress	Bureau of Transformer, Second Time Its a Charm	Nominated	
2019	Golden Bud - The Fourth Network Film And Television Festival	Actress of the Year	Bureau of Transformer, Second Time Its a Charm	Won	
2019	8th iQiyi All-Star Carnival	Best Couple (with Chen He)	Bureau of Transformer	Won	
2019	11th China TV Drama Awards	Youth Charismatic Actress	—N/a	Won	
2020	7th The Actors of China Award Ceremony	Best Actress (Emerald)	—N/a	Nominated	
