= Flying Apsaras Award for Outstanding Actress =

Category of Chinese television award

Feitian Award for Outstanding Actress (中国电视剧飞天奖优秀女演员奖) is a main category of the Feitian Awards.

== 2020s ==
Year	Annual	Nominees	Titles
2026	35th	Song Jia 宋佳	She and Her Girls 山花烂漫时
2026	35th	Ma Yili 马伊琍	To the Wonder 我的阿勒泰
2026	35th	Yan Ni 闫妮	Romance in the Alley 小巷人家
2026	35th	Wu Yue 吴越	Silent Honor 沉默的荣耀
2026	35th	Chi Peng 迟蓬	This Thriving Land 生万物
2024	34th	Zhao Liying 赵丽颖	Wild Bloom 风吹半夏
2024	34th	Tiffany Tang 唐嫣	Blossoms Shanghai 繁花
2024	34th	Yang Rong 杨蓉	Daughter of the Mountains 大山的女儿
2024	34th	Liu Lin 刘琳	A Long Way Home 父辈的荣耀
2024	34th	Li Gengxi 李庚希	Beyond 超越; The Long Season 漫长的季节
2022	33rd	Reyizha 热依扎	Minning Town 山海情
2022	33rd	Zhou Xun 周迅	Medal of the Republic: The Gift from Tu Youyou 功勋: 功勋之屠呦呦的礼物
2022	33rd	Yan Ni 闫妮	Building the Stage 装台
2022	33rd	Sun Li 孙俪	The Ideal City 理想之城
2022	33rd	Tong Yao 童瑶	The Rebel 叛逆者
2020	32nd	Qin Hailu 秦海璐	The Legendary Tavern 老酒馆
2020	32nd	Hai Qing 海清	A Little Reunion 小欢喜
2020	32nd	Hao Lei 郝蕾	The Love of Courtyard 情满四合院
2020	32nd	Wang Qianhua 王茜华	The Red of Persimmon 岁岁年年柿柿红
2020	32nd	Tong Yao 童瑶	Like a Flowing River 大江大河

== 2010s ==
Year	Annual	Nominees	Titles
2018 (Note: The awards ceremony was held on April 3, 2018 instead of in late 2017. No explanation was given for the change.)	31st	Sun Li 孙俪	Nothing Gold Can Stay 那年花开月正圆
2018	31st	Qin Hailu 秦海璐	White Deer Plain 白鹿原
2018	31st	Liu Tao 刘涛	Ode to Joy 欢乐颂
2018	31st	Jiang Xin 蒋欣	Ode to Joy 欢乐颂
2018	31st	Yin Tao 殷桃	Feather Flies To The Sky 鸡毛飞上天
2015	30th	Mei Ting 梅婷	Romance of Our Parents 父母爱情
2015	30th	Zhou Xun 周迅	Red Sorghum 红高粱
2015	30th	Liu Tao 刘涛	To Elderly With Love 老有所依; Nirvana in Fire 琅琊榜
2013	29th	Yin Tao 殷桃	Family on the Go 温州一家人 延安爱情
2013	29th	Ma Su 马苏	Beijing Youth 北京青年 厂花
2013	29th	Tong Lei 童蕾	断刺
2013	29th	Song Jia 宋佳	The Cliff 悬崖; The Shengtianmen Gate 圣天门口
2011	28th	Jiang Wenli 蒋雯丽	幸福来敲门
2011	28th	Hai Qing 海清	A Beautiful Daughter-in-law Era 媳妇的美好时代
2011	28th	Yan Bingyan 颜丙燕	远山的红叶
2011	28th	Chi Peng 迟鹏	Yi Meng 沂蒙
2011	28th	Chen Jin 陈瑾	医者仁心
2011	28th	Cao Xiwen 曹曦文	野鸭子

== 2000s ==
Year	Annual	Nominees	Titles
2009	27th	Sa Rina萨日娜	Brave The Journey to Northeast 闯关东
2009	27th	Yan Ni 闫妮	The North Wind Blows 北风那个吹
2009	27th	Jiang Wenli 蒋雯丽	Golden Marriage 金婚
2009	27th	Liu Jia 刘佳	Gebi Mother 戈壁母亲
2009	27th	Chen Xiaoyi 陈小艺	大工匠
2009	27th	Tao Hong 陶虹	Chuncao 春草
2009	27th	Wang Luodan 王珞丹	Struggle 奋斗
2009	27th	Yao Chen 姚晨	Lurk 潜伏
2009	27th	Wang Yajie 王雅捷	I Am the Sun 我是太阳
2009	27th	Pan Yuchen 潘雨辰	Meditations on White Birth Forest 静静地白桦林
2007	26th	Liu Jia 刘佳	Ren Changxia 任长霞
2007	26th	Jiang Qinqin 蒋勤勤	Qiao's Grand Courtyard 乔家大院
2007	26th	Chen Xiaoyi 陈小艺	Halfway Couples 半路夫妻
2007	26th	Zhao Wei 赵薇	Moment in Peking 京华烟云
2007	26th	Cheng Qifeng 程启凤	Lao Niang Lei 老娘泪
2007	26th	Sun Li 孙俪	Happiness as Flowers 幸福像花儿一样
2007	26th	Yin Tao 樱桃	Happiness as Flowers 幸福像花儿一样
2007	26th	Yan Xuejing 闫学晶	都市外乡人
2007	26th	He Lin 何琳	麻辣婆媳
2005	25th	Lu Yuan 鲁园	Watch For The Happiness守望幸福
2005	25th	Li Lin 李琳	历史的天空
2005	25th	Miao Pu 苗圃	Pagoda Tree Aroma in Autumn 五月槐花香
2004	24th	Ju Xue 剧雪	亲情树
2004	24th	Wang Qianhua 王茜华	当家的女人
2004	24th	Zhu Yuanyuan 朱媛媛	浪漫的事
2004	24th	Ni Ping 倪萍	浪漫的事
2004	24th	Mao Weitao 茅威涛	Kong Yiji 孔乙己
2004	24th	Sun Li 孙俪	Goddess of Mercy 玉观音
2004	24th	Peng Yu 彭玉	浪漫的事
2003	23rd	Xu Fan 徐帆	青衣
2003	23rd	Wang Haiyan 王海燕	誓言无声
2003	23rd	Xu Qing 许晴	DA师
2003	23rd	Tao Huimin 陶慧敏	DA师
2003	23rd	Gao Xiumin 高秀敏	Liu Laogen (Season 2) / 刘老根（第二部）
2003	23rd	Ding Jiali 丁嘉丽	干部
2003	23rd	Hao Yan 郝严	金鲤鱼
2003	23rd	Liu Jia 刘佳	奔向海洋
2003	23rd	Song Xiaoying 宋晓英	张学良
2003	23rd	He Saifei 何赛飞	至高利益
2002	22nd	Tao Hong 陶虹	Hollow Mirror / 空镜子
2002	22nd	Jiang Shan 江珊	Never Give Up 永不放弃
2002	22nd	Niu Li 牛莉	Hollow Mirror 空镜子
2002	22nd	Lü Liping 吕丽萍	The Burning Passion of the Years 激情燃烧的岁月
2002	22nd	Chen Jin 陈瑾	Great Judge 大法官
2002	22nd	Xu Qin 许晴	A Chinese Woman at Gestapo Gunpoint 盖世太保枪口下的中国女人
2002	22nd	Wang Haiyan 王海燕	World granary 天下粮仓
2002	22nd	Guo Keyu 郭柯宇	Great Judge 大法官
2002	22nd	Yuan Huiqin 袁慧琴	The Queen of Qidan 契丹英后
2002	22nd	Yuan Shumei 袁淑梅	Xi Bai Po 西柏坡
2001	21st	Chen Jin 陈瑾	Sister in Law 嫂子
2001	21st	Xi Meijuan 奚美娟	Red Carnation 红色康乃馨
2000	20th	Song Jia 宋佳	嫂娘
2000	20th	Zhang Xiaolei 张小磊	Pediatrician 儿科医生

== 1990s ==
Year	Annual	Nominees	Titles
1999	19th	Jiang Wenli 蒋雯丽	Holding Hands 牵手
1999	19th	Ding Jiali 丁嘉丽	A Wordless Love 无言的爱
1998	18th	Sa Rina 萨日娜	情感的守望
1998	18th	Wang Yumei 王玉梅	Family 儿女情长
1997	17th	Chen Jin 陈瑾	Campus Pioneers 校园先锋
1996	16th	Lü Zhong 吕中	Deng Yingchao and Her Mother 邓颖超和她的妈妈
1995	15th	N/A	
1994	14th	Zuo Ling 左羚	Affairs of the Pearl River 情满珠江
1993	13th	Song Chunli 宋春丽	Beauty 风雨丽人
1992	12th	Lü Liping 吕丽萍	Stories From The Editorial Board 编辑部的故事
1991	11th	Ling Li 李羚	Song Qingling and Her Sisters 宋庆龄和她的姐妹们
1990	10th	Wu Mian 吴冕	Shanghai Family 上海一家人

== 1980s ==
Year	Annual	Nominees	Titles
1989	9th	N/A	
1988	8th	Ma Lan 马兰	Yan Fengying 严凤英
1987	7th	Fang Qingzhuo 方青卓	Snow Field 雪野
1986	6th	N/A	
1985	5th	N/A	
1984	4th	Xiang Hong 向虹	A Story of Life 生命的故事
1984	4th	Fan Yanhua 范艳华	她从画中走出来
1983	3rd	Xiao Xiong 肖雄	The Wasted Years 蹉跎岁月
