= Liu Tao =

Chinese actress (born 1978)

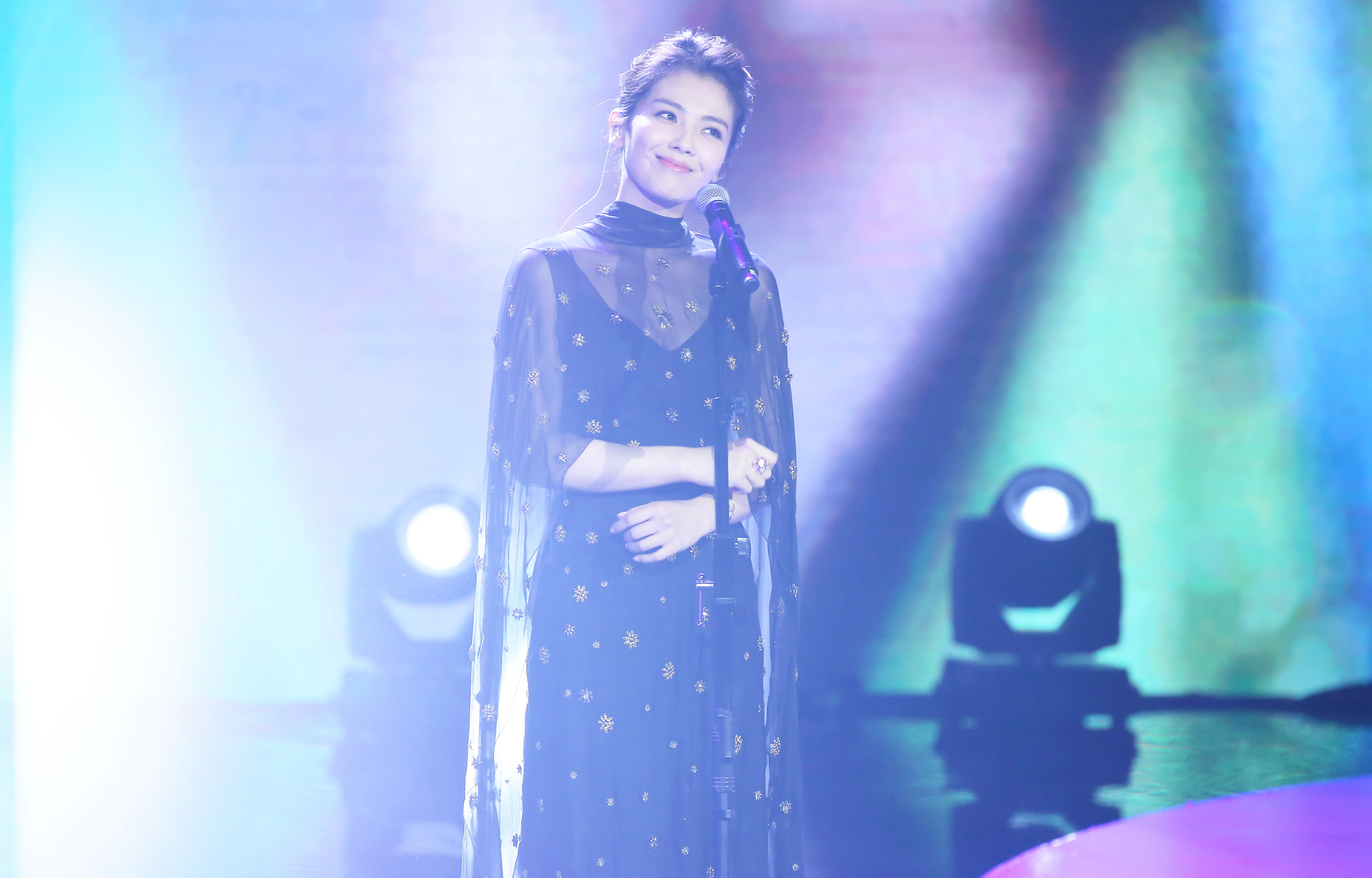
- Liu in June 2017
- Born: 12 July 1978 (age 48); Nanchang, Jiangxi
- Education: Guangdong University of Foreign Studies
- Occupations: Actress; Singer
- Years active: 2000–present
- Agent: Beijing Junqi Feiyang Media Co
- Spouse: Wang Ke (m. 2008)
- Children: Wang Ziyan (王紫嫣); Wang Zijing (王子京)

Chinese name
- Simplified Chinese: 刘涛
- Traditional Chinese: 劉濤
Transcriptions
Standard Mandarin
- Hanyu Pinyin: Líu Tāo

Liu Tao (simplified Chinese: 刘涛; traditional Chinese: 劉濤; pinyin: Liú Tāo, born 12 July 1978) is a Chinese actress. She is known for her roles in My Fair Princess III (2003), Madame White Snake (2006), Mazu (2012), To Elderly With Love (2013), Nirvana in Fire (2015), Legend of Mi Yue (2015), and Ode to Joy (2016).

== Career ==
Liu entered the industry in 2000, when she was cast in the family sitcom Daughter-in-Law.

In 2003, Liu was cast in My Fair Princess III, playing the role of Burmese princess Musha. Following the series, Liu rose to fame in China. Her subsequent performance as A'zhu in Demi-Gods and Semi-Devils (2003) made her a household name.

In 2006, Liu starred in Madame White Snake and gained attention for her portrayal of the titular heroine.

Liu challenged her first antagonist role in Da Li Princess (2009) co-starring Ruby Lin. In 2012, she played Mazu in the television series of the same name. The drama gained high ratings during its run and won at the Outstanding Television Series award at the China TV Golden Eagle Award and Flying Apsaras Awards.

Liu's subsequent performance as a capable career woman and housewife in acclaimed melodrama To Elderly With Love (2013) garnered her the Best Actress award at the China TV Golden Eagle Award and the Best Performing Arts Award at the China Golden Eagle TV Arts Festival. The same year, she starred in Good Wife as a mother and housewife who struggles with the challenges of family-life. The family drama was a ratings hit and along with the discussion of Liu's own marital arrangements, became one of the most talked-about topics on Weibo. As a result, Liu gained a surge in popularity.

In 2015, she starred in the acclaimed historical wuxia drama Nirvana in Fire, playing a strong warrior princess. A wax figure based on her role "Ni Huang" was displayed in Beijing's Madame Tussauds Wax Museum. The same year, she co-starred in historical drama The Legend of Mi Yue as the antagonist, and won the Best Supporting Actress award at the Shanghai Television Festival.

In 2016, Liu headlined the modern romance drama Ode to Joy, playing a capable but insecure woman. The drama garnered positive reviews and high ratings, and Liu was nominated as Best Actress at the Huading Awards and Shanghai Television Festival.

In 2017, Liu starred in the historical drama The Advisors Alliance, portraying Zhang Chunhua, the wife of Sima Yi. The same year, she featured in the crime thriller Peace Breaker and action thriller The Foreigner.

In 2019, Liu reunited with Ode to Joy co-star Yang Shuo in romance melodrama Hope All is Well with Us.

In 2019, Liu starred in the historical drama Poetry of the Song Dynasty, acting for Empress Liu E, the wife of Emperor Zhenzong portrayed by the Taiwanese actor Vic Chou. It is directed by renowned director Li Shaohong. The same year, she starred in the drama film Midnight Diner, based on the Japanese manga of the same name.

== Cultural impact ==
=== Mazu portrayal and online devotion ===
Liu Tao played the sea goddess Mazu in the 2012 television series Mazu. Her portrayal became popular in Fujian, where Mazu has long been worshipped as a protector of fishermen and sailors.

Before filming began, the crew visited the Mazu Ancestral Temple on Meizhou Island, Fujian, to seek approval for Liu Tao to play the goddess. According to reports, they used jiaobei (筊杯), traditional divination blocks. Liu Tao received three consecutive shengbei (圣杯), which were taken as a sign of Mazu's approval.

Director Lu Qi later recalled that the weather was sometimes sunny during filming at sea, even when rain had been forecast. Liu Tao also said that she kept a statue of Mazu during filming and prayed to her each morning.

After the series was broadcast, some people in Fujian began using pictures of Liu Tao dressed as Mazu for worship. Some fishermen placed her pictures on their boats and prayed for safe journeys. Some families also kept her pictures on home altars. Her portrayal became so familiar that some local residents began calling her Mazu. When she appeared in a tourism video for her home province of Jiangxi, some people in Fujian reportedly said, "Mazu is ours."

In April 2025, Liu Tao returned to Meizhou Island for celebrations marking the 1,065th anniversary of Mazu's birth. On 19 April, she offered a peach-shaped birthday cake to a statue of Mazu at the ancestral temple. She also attended the spring worship ceremony on 20 April. The city of Putian gave her the titles "Global Ambassador for Mazu Culture Promotion" (妈祖文化全球推广大使) and "Putian Culture and Tourism Promotion Ambassador" (莆田文旅推荐官).

Liu Tao's pictures as Mazu also became popular online. Some Chinese internet users set them as phone wallpapers or lock screens and made wishes for good luck, safety, or success in examinations. Others left wishes in the comment sections of her social media posts, turning them into online wishing spaces. In February 2026, Liu Tao responded that these wishes showed people's hopes for a better world.

In May 2026, Liu Tao again visited the Mazu Ancestral Temple on Meizhou Island for celebrations marking the 1,066th anniversary of Mazu's birth.

== Filmography ==
=== Film ===
Year	English title	Chinese title	Role	Notes/Ref.
2006	The Story of A Bao	阿宝的故事	Liu Jia	
2011	The Founding of a Party	建党伟业	Consort Jin	
2014	You Are The One	恋者多喜欢	Cheng Yu	
2015	Let's Get Married	咱们结婚吧	Tian Haixin	
2016	"So Lucky"	杠上开花		Cameo
2017	Peace Breaker	破·局	Lin Xiaoye	
2017	The Foreigner	英倫對決	Lam Keyi	
2018	The Monkey King 3	西游记：女儿国	Guanyin	
2019	Midnight Diner	深夜食堂	Ming Yue	
2019	My People, My Country	我和我的祖国		
2021	City in the Air	空中之城	Bai Rong	
2024	High Forces	危机航线	Fu Yuan	

=== Television series ===
Year	English title	Chinese title	Role	Notes/Ref.
2000		九记饭馆	Chu Chu	
2000	Daughter-in-Law	外来媳妇本地郎	Hu Xingzi	
2001	The Sino-Dutch War 1661	英雄郑成功	Hai Xia	
2001		皇城神鹰	Princess Feixue	
2001	The Joy of Spring	欢乐青春	Bai Li	
2002	The Railway Station	候车室的故事	Xiao Li	
2002	Love Me, Love Me Not	信是有缘	Fang Xiuxiu	
2003	My Fair Princess III	还珠格格3	Mu Sha	
2003	The Formidable Sword of Guan Xi	关西无极刀	Royal concubine of Loulan	
2003	Demi-Gods and Semi-Devils	天龙八部	A Zhu	
2003	Red & Black 2000	红与黑2000	Xiang Xiaoxiao	
2003	Taiwan Strait	台湾海峡	Chen Sisi	
2004	The Last Concubine	末代皇妃	Qi Ruyu	
2004	Hero During Yongle Period	永乐英雄儿女	Princess Man'er	
2005	So It's You	原来就是你	Du Muxue/ Jin'er	
2005	How Much Sorrow Do You Have	问君能有几多愁	Queen Zhou the Elder/ Madame Huarui	
2005	Cherry Red	樱桃正红	Meng Xing	
2006	The Legend and the Hero	封神榜之凤鸣岐山	Chang'e	Cameo
2006	Forensic Heroes	遍地英雄	Zhou Ju	
2006	Madame White Snake	白蛇传	Bai Suzhen	
2006	Paris Sonata	巴黎恋歌	Yu Yue	Cameo
2006	Fairy of the Chalice	夜光神杯	Cheng Xiuxiu	
2006	Five Disciples of Master Huang	黄飞鸿五大弟子	Mengsao	Cameo
2007	The Sword and the Chess of Death	魔剑生死棋	Liu Yiyi	
2007	Big Shot	大人物	Chu Chu	
2008	Flower Woman	女人花	Huang Mei'er	
2008	Dali Princess	大理公主	Yang Yujiao/ Yang Axi	
2008	Wear a Mask and Dance	戴着面具跳舞	Han Sirui	Cameo
2009	Cold Night	寒夜	Zeng Shusheng	
2009	Prelude of Lotus Lantern	宝莲灯前传	Yaoji	Cameo
2011	Dragon and Tiger Mountain	盘龙卧虎高山顶	Bai Yu'e	
2011	Qian Duo Duo Marry Remember	钱多多嫁人记	Qian Duoduo	
2011	Hidden Identity	掩护	Gong Li	
2011	Journey to the West	西游记	Guanyin	
2011	Olive Tree	橄榄树	Mu Shan	
2011	The Glamorous Imperial Concubine	倾世皇妃	Wen Jingruo	Cameo
2011	Falling Leaves in Chang'an	叶落长安	Bai Lianhua	
2012	Happiness Full House	幸福满屋	Yang Lu	
2012		知足常乐	Sun Yun	
2012	Two Female Bandits	两个女匪王	Kui Ying	
2012	Mazu	妈祖	Mazu	
2013	Good Wife	贤妻	Han Dayun	
2013		天下人家	Yang Xiaohui	Cameo
2013	Puzzle 1931	迷局1931	Du Juan	
2013	Angel Cometh Tonight	今夜天使降临	Peng Jiajia	
2013	To Elderly with Love	老有所依	Jiang Mulan	
2014	The Story of a Woodcutter and his Fox Wife	刘海砍樵	Da Jie	Cameo
2014	Outsmarted His Huashan Legend	智取华山传奇	Yang Yuhuan	
2014	Happiness Drop From The Clouds	幸福从天而降	Jiang Tianlan	
2014	Food to Pregnancy	食来孕转	Shen Guyu	
2014	Huahong Huahuo	花红花火	Hua Hong	
2015	The Next Station	下一站婚姻	Deng Caocao	
2015	Warriors on Fire	铁在烧	Zhao Zhiyi	
2015	Nirvana in Fire	琅琊榜	Princess Nihuang	
2015	The Legend of Mi Yue	芈月传	Mi Shu	
2016	The Link	天伦	Mei Yujuan	Cameo
2016	Ode to Joy	欢乐颂	Andy	
2016	Forever Love	爱情万万岁	Jin Na	
2017	Ode to Joy 2	欢乐颂2	Andy	
2017	The Advisors Alliance	军师联盟	Zhang Chunhua	
2019	Hope All is Well with Us	我们都要好好的	Xun Zhao	
2019	Scouring Marriage	亲爱的婚姻	Wang Keke	
2020	Jing De Zhen	景德镇	Zhao Yuru	
2020	Face to Sea	追梦	Du Fang	
2021	Poetry of the Song Dynasty	大宋宫词	Empress Liu E	
2021	Love is True	我是真的爱你	Xiao Yan	
2021	Hand in Hand	陪你一起长大	Su Xing	
2021	Star of Ocean	星辰大海	Jian Ai	
2022	Reset	开端	Du Jingsong	
2022	Vacation of Love 2	假日暖洋洋2	Cheng Man	
2022	Gentlemen of East 8th	东八区的先生们	Tamia	
2022	Bright Future	县委大院	Li Tang	
2022	Liberation of Shanghai	破晓东方	Ji Nan Yin	
2023	Be Your Own Light	做自己的光	He Huan	
TBA	Puzzle	拼图	Mei Ruobing	

=== Variety show ===
Year	English title	Chinese title	Role	Ref.
2014	Divas Hit the Road Season 1	花儿与少年第一季	Regular Member	
2016	Crossover Singer Season 1	跨界歌王	Contestant (Winner)	
2017–2019	The Inn	亲爱的·客栈	Cast member	
2026	Memories beyond Horizon Season 4	无限超越班 第四季	Public Judge	
2026	Game of Flame Season 2	食神·百厨大战	Executive producer	

== Discography ==
=== Albums ===
Year	English title	Chinese title	Ref.
2014	The Best Time	最好的時光	

=== Singles ===
Year	English title	Chinese title	Album	Notes/Ref.
2003	"Only Need You"	只要有你	My Fair Princess III OST	
2006	"Fall in Love with You"	爱上你	Madame White Snake OST	
2006	"Cherry Blossom Island"	桃花岛	Forensic Heroes OST	
2007	"Cold Night"	寒夜	Cold Night OST	
2008	"Tears of Love"	爱的眼泪	Dali Princess OST	
2013	"How a Heart-broken Girl is Like"	伤了心的女人怎么了	Good Wife OST	
2014	"One More Time"	再一次	Happiness Drop From The Clouds OST	
2014	"I Won't Be Alone"	我不会一个人	Happiness Drop From The Clouds OST	
2015	"Faded Beauty"	红颜旧	Nirvana in Fire OST	
2016	"There Will Be Happiness Waiting For You"	总有幸福在等你	Ode to Joy OST	with Jiang Xin, Wang Ziwen, Yang Zi & Qiao Xin
2016	"Can't Say It Aloud"	说不出口	Ode to Joy OST	
2017	"Us"	我们	Ode to Joy 2 OST	with Jiang Xin, Wang Ziwen, Yang Zi & Qiao Xin
2017	"The Feeling of Home"	家的滋味	Ode to Joy 2 OST	
2017	"Meeting Love"	遇到爱	Ode to Joy 2 OST	
2017	"Battle of Cheng Nan"	戰城南	—N/a	Theme song of mobile game 胡萊三國2
2017	"Waiting For You To Come Back"	等著你回來	Peace Breaker OST	
2017	"Ordinary Person"	普通人	The Foreigner OST	with Jackie Chan
2019	"Quiet"	靜好	Hope All is Well with Us OST	
2019	"Love Your Innocent Eyes"	爱你无辜的眼睛	Scouring Marriage OST	
2019	"The Temple of Heaven"	遇见天坛	The Temple of Heaven OST	

== Accolades ==
=== Awards and nominations ===
Year	Award	Category	Nominated work	Result	Ref.
2013	17th China Music Awards	Gold Song Award	"Brave Love"	Won	
2013	5th China TV Drama Awards	Best Actress	To Elderly with Love	Won	
2014	27th China TV Golden Eagle Award	Best Performing Arts Award	To Elderly with Love	Won	
2014	27th China TV Golden Eagle Award	Audience's Choice for Actress	To Elderly with Love	Won	
2015	30th Flying Apsaras Awards	Outstanding Actress	To Elderly with Love	Nominated	
2015	30th Flying Apsaras Awards	Outstanding Actress	Nirvana in Fire	Nominated	
2015	2nd The Actors of China Award Ceremony	Best Actress (Emerald)	Nirvana in Fire	Won	
2016	19th Huading Awards	Best Actress (Ancient Drama)	Nirvana in Fire	Nominated	
2016	19th Huading Awards	Best Actress (Revolutionary-Era Drama)	Warriors on Fire	Nominated	
2016	22nd Shanghai Television Festival	Best Supporting Actress	The Legend of Mi Yue	Won	
2016	28th China TV Golden Eagle Award	Audience's Choice for Actress	The Legend of Mi Yue	Nominated	
2016	28th China TV Golden Eagle Award	Most Popular Actress	The Legend of Mi Yue	Won	
2017	3rd Asia Rainbow TV Awards	Best Actress (Ancient Drama)	Nirvana in Fire	Nominated	
2017	3rd Asia Rainbow TV Awards	Best Actress (Modern Drama)	Ode to Joy	Nominated	
2017	22nd Huading Awards	Best Actress	Ode to Joy	Nominated	
2017	23rd Shanghai Television Festival	Best Actress	Ode to Joy	Nominated	
2017	8th Macau International Television Festival	Best Actress	Ode to Joy 2	Nominated	
2018	31st Flying Apsaras Award	Outstanding Actress	Ode to Joy	Nominated	
2018	29th China TV Golden Eagle Award	Best Actress	Ode to Joy, The Advisors Alliance	Nominated	
2018	24th Huading Awards	Best Actress	The Advisors Alliance	Nominated	
2018	5th Hengdian Film and TV Festival of China	Best Actress	The Advisors Alliance	Won	
2019	6th The Actors of China Award Ceremony	Best Actress (Sapphire Category)	Hope All Is Well With Us	Nominated	
2019	26th Huading Awards	Best Actress (Modern drama)	Hope All Is Well With Us	Nominated	
2020	7th The Actors of China Award Ceremony	Best Actress (Sapphire)	—N/a	Nominated	

=== Forbes China Celebrity 100 ===
Year	Rank	Ref.
2014	51st	
2015	67th	
2017	6th	
2019	37th	
2020	21st	
