= Jiang Xin =

Chinese actress (born 1983)

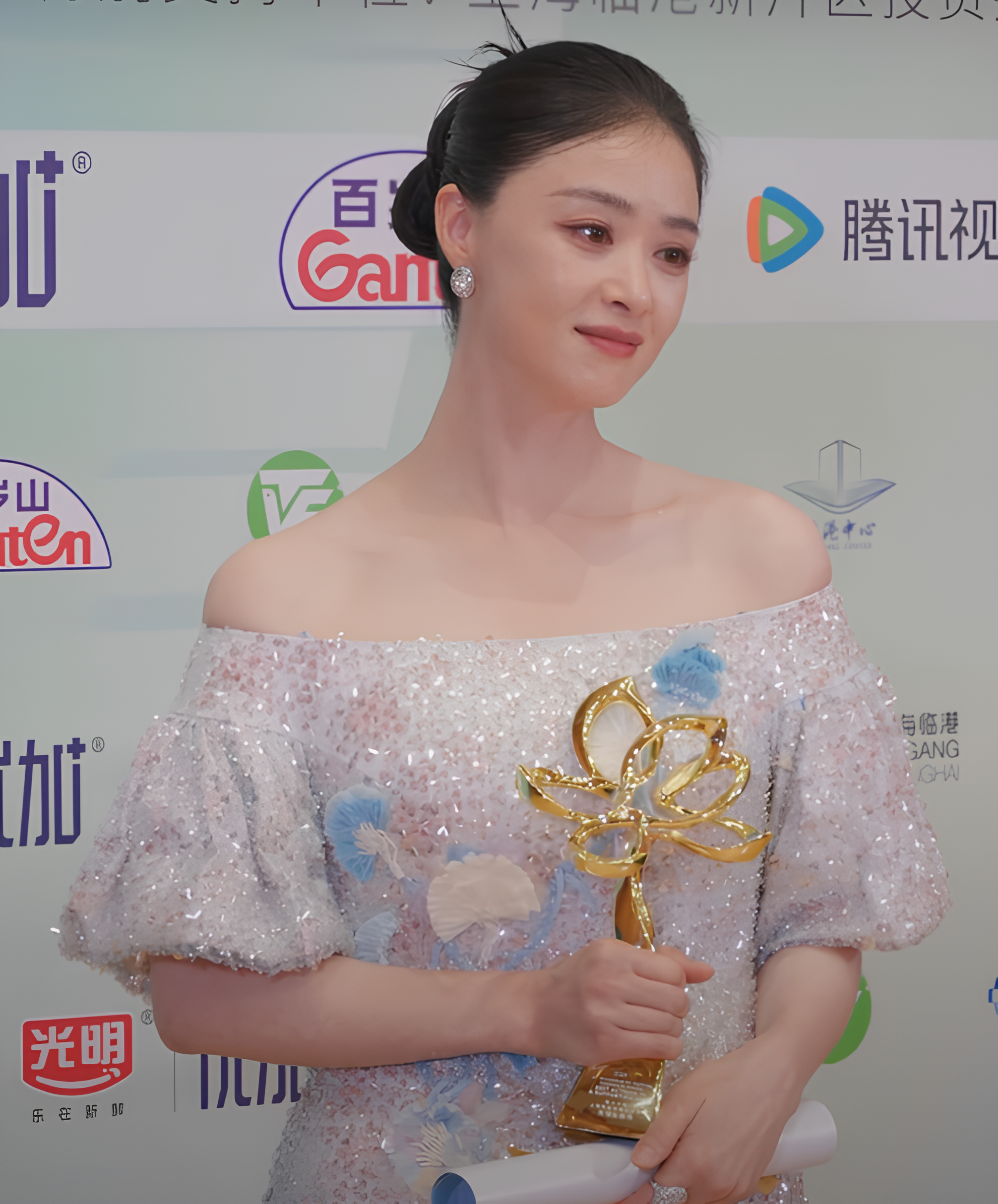
- Jiang on the white carpet backstage at the closing ceremony of the 30th Shanghai Television Festival on 27 June 2025
- Born: 8 May 1983 (age 43); Ürümqi, Xinjiang, China
- Other name: Rulu Jiang
- Education: Henan Vocational College of Art
- Occupation: Actress
- Years active: 1995–present
- Agent: Jiang Xin Studio

Chinese name
- Traditional Chinese: 蔣欣
- Simplified Chinese: 蒋欣
Transcriptions
Standard Mandarin
- Hanyu Pinyin: Jiǎng Xīn

Jiang Xin (Chinese: 蒋欣; born 8 May 1983), also known by her English name Rulu Jiang, is a Chinese actress.

Jiang ranked 56 on Forbes China Celebrity 100 in 2017.

== Life and career ==
Jiang entered Zhengzhou City's Children Arts Group at the age of 7 and Henan Children Arts Group at the age of 8. At the age of 9, Jiang began acting in television series. She later graduated from the Henan Vocational College of Art with a major in performance.

Jiang first became known after starring in Zhang Jizhong's 2003 television adaption of Demi-Gods and Semi-Devils. She also played supporting roles in the hit fantasy dramas Chinese Paladin (2005) and Happy 7 Fairies (2005). However over the next few years, none of her roles resonated with the audience, and Jiang remained relatively unknown.

Jiang rose to fame in 2012 for her role as Consort Hua in the critically acclaimed historical drama, Empresses in the Palace. One of her lines in the series, "Jian ren jiu shi jiao qing" (贱人就是矫情), which literally means "bitches are hypocrites," was particularly popular and went viral on the internet. Jiang won the Best Supporting Actress Award at the 2012 China TV Drama Awards.

Jiang then teamed up with veteran actors Chen Baoguo, Ma Yuanzheng and Niu Lin in the literacy period drama The Old Farmers (2014), playing a selfish and scheming village woman. Her performance earned her one nomination for Best Supporting Actress at the Shanghai Television Festival.

In 2015, Jiang starred in the fantasy romance drama Hua Xu Yin : City of Desperate Love, a television depiction of the fictional universe Novoland. Her portrayal of the proud and valiant heroine earned her the Best Actress award in the ancient drama genre at the Huading Awards. The same year, she featured in the hit dramas The Journey of Flower and The Legend of Mi Yue.

In 2016, Jiang co-starred in the metropolitan romance drama, Ode to Joy, which depicts the stories of five young women who comes from different social and educational backgrounds, but share a common goal. The series was a critical and commercial success, and Jiang received positive reviews for her portrayal of Fan Shengmei, an insecure and realistic career woman. She was nominated as Best Actress at the Huading Awards and Magnolia Awards. She reprised her role in the season 2 of the television series, which started airing in 2017.

In 2017, Jiang made her big-screen debut in the comedy film Super Teacher.

== Personal life ==
Jiang dated actors Wang Yang and Ye Zuxin.

== Filmography ==
=== Film ===
Year	English title	Chinese title	Role	Notes/Ref.
2017	Super Teacher	麻辣学院	Superstar Jiang	
2018	Miss Puff	泡芙小姐		Cameo

=== Television series ===
Year	English title	Chinese title	Role	Notes/Ref.
1995	Five Men Two Women	五男二女	Quan Yue	
1996	Queen Pendant	墜子皇后	Qing Xiu (young)	
1997		伏羲女娲	Shao Yan	
1999		混世奇才庞振坤	Hong Ye	
2001	Big Feet Queen Ma	大脚马皇后	Qiu Ju	
2001		大钦差之皇城神鹰	Pang Niu	
2002		都是钱闹的	Xiao Hong	not broadcast
2002	Chief of Public Security Bureau	公安局長	Li Fan	
2003	Demi-Gods and Semi-Devils	天龍八部	Mu Wanqing	
2004	Amazing Detective Di Renjie	神探狄仁杰	Fang Yingyu	
2004	Undercover	卧底双绝	Xia Hong	
2004	Dragon Stamp	龙票	Xi Mujun	
2005	In Great Entanglement	危情杜鵑	Lu Xiaona	
2005	Chinese Paladin	仙剑奇侠传	Nu Yuan/Jiang Wan	
2005	Happy 7 Fairies	欢天喜地七仙女	Fourth Fairy Lv'er	
2005	Strange Tales of Liao Zhai	聊斋志异	Snake Spirit	
2006	Ming Dynasty	大明天下	Mu Rongqiu	
2006	The Jade King	翡翠王	Feng Juan	
2007	Metropolis Woman.Com	寻都市女人.com之阴谋与爱情演	Hu Ling'er	
2008		丑女也疯狂	Ye Zi	
2008	If There's Still A Tomorrow	如果还有明天	Liu Chunhong	
2008	Marriage Jet Lag	夫妻时差	Mao Mao	
2009		戈壁儿女	Liu Xiang	
2009	Late Marriage	晚婚	Xiao Li	Cameo
2009	Love at Sun Moon Lake	愛在日月潭	Jiang He	
2009	Oriental Casablanca	东方卡萨布兰卡	Lin Na	
2011	Red Pagoda	紅槐花	Zheng Xiuyun	
2011	Memory of Life and Death	我的燃情岁月	Liu Lianhua	
2011	Empresses in the Palace	甄嬛传	Consort Hua	
2012		知青	Li He	
2012	Arrows on the Bowstring	箭在弦上	Xu Yihang	
2012	Fission	裂变2	Gu Xiaofeng	
2014	Criminal police Li Chun Chun	女刑警李春春	Lucy Du	
2014	Three Bosom Girls	新闺蜜时代	Wang Yuan	
2014		土楼里的女人	Li Shengjin	
2014		边城	Luo Xiaodong	
2014	Our Second Child	二胎	Tang Qiaofei	
2014	Spring Of The Sparrow	麻雀春天	Ge Hongling	
2014	The Chinese Farmers	老农民	Qiao Yue	
2015	The Journey of Flower	花千骨	Xia Zixun	
2015	Grasshopper	蚂蚱	Zhao Weilan	
2015	Hua Xu Yin : City of Desperate Love	華胥引之绝爱之城	Song Ning	
2015	The Legend of Mi Yue	芈月传	Concubine Ju	
2016	Keep the Marriage as Jade	守婚如玉	Hua Sha	
2016	A Woman's Sky	女人的天空	Lan Xin	
2016	Ode to Joy	欢乐颂	Fan Shengmei	
2016	The Revolver	左轮手枪	Liu Xiuqin	
2016	Happy Mitan	欢喜密探	Shen Xu	Cameo
2016	Full House of Happiness	老爸当家	Quan Wei	
2017	Heirs	继承人	Tang Ning	
2017	Ode to Joy 2	欢乐颂2	Fan Shengmei	
2017	Blind Date	盲约	Xia Tian	
2017	Ordinary Person Character	凡人的品格	Chang Ge	
2019	When We Are Together	遇见幸福	Zhen Kaifang	
2019	The Galloped Era	奔腾年代		
2019	The Best Partner	精英律师		Cameo
2020	If Time Flows Back	如果岁月可回头	Jiang Xiaomei	
2020	Together	在一起		
2020	Eighteen Springs	情深缘起	Gu Manzhen	
2020	Living Toward The Sun	向阳而生	Xiong Dun	
2021	See You Again	再见，那一天	Mei Xiang	
2021	Medal of the Republic	功勋	Shen Jilan	
2021	A Love for Dilemma	小舍得	Tian Yulan	
TBA	Eighteen Springs	半生緣	Gu Manzhen	
TBA	As Long As We Are Together	小满生活	He Jiaru	
TBA	The Last Wulin	最後的武林	Teng Jifeng	

== Discography ==
=== Soundtrack appearances ===
Year	English title	Chinese title	Album	Notes/Ref.
2016	"There Will Be Happiness Waiting For You"	总有幸福在等你	Ode to Joy OST	with Liu Tao, Wang Ziwen, Yang Zi & Qiao Xin
2016	"Cinderella"	灰姑娘	Ode to Joy OST	Fan Shengmei's theme song
2017	"Love is Clear"	明明爱	Heirs OST	with Hawick Lau
2017	"Us"	我们	Ode to Joy 2 OST	with Liu Tao, Wang Ziwen, Yang Zi & Qiao Xin
2017	"Not Afraid to be Alone"	不怕一个人	Ode to Joy 2 OST	Fan Shengmei's theme song
2017	"You're an Idol"	你是偶像	Up Idol theme song	with cast members
2017	"One Person's Summer"	一个人的夏天	Blind Date OST	

== Awards and nominations ==
Year	Award	Category	Nominated work	Result	Ref.
2012	2nd Sohu TV Drama Awards	Best Supporting Actress	Empresses in the Palace	Won	
2012	4th China TV Drama Awards	Best Supporting Actress	Empresses in the Palace	Won	
2013	China TV Director Committee Awards	Outstanding Supporting Actress	Empresses in the Palace	Won	
2015	21st Shanghai Television Festival	Best Supporting Actress	The Chinese Farmers	Nominated	
2016	19th Huading Awards	Best Actress (Ancient Drama)	Hua Xu Yin : City of Desperate Love	Won	
2016	11th National Top-Notch Television Production Award Ceremony	Top Ten Actors	The Journey of Flower, Ode to Joy	Won	
2017	22nd Huading Awards	Best Actress (Contemporary Drama)	Ode to Joy	Nominated	
2017	23rd Shanghai Television Festival	Best Actress	Ode to Joy	Nominated	
2018	31st Flying Apsaras Award	Outstanding Actress	Ode to Joy	Nominated	
2020	7th The Actors of China Award Ceremony	Best Actress (Sapphire)	—N/a	Nominated	
2025	30th Shanghai Television Festival	Best Supporting Actress	Romance in the Alley	Won	
