= Like a Flowing River =

- Promotional poster for part one
- Genre: Period
- Based on: 大江东去 (River of Time) by Ah Nai
- Written by: Yuan Keping
- Directed by: Kong Sheng; Huang Wei
- Starring: Wang Kai; Yang Shuo; Dong Zijian
- Country of origin: China
- Original language: Chinese
- No. of episodes: 47 (Part 1), 39 (Part 2), 33 (Part 3)

Production
- Executive producer: Hou Hongliang
- Camera setup: Multiple-camera setup
- Running time: 40-45 minutes
- Production companies: Daylight Entertainment (Dongyang) Television Ltd; Shanghai Media Group; SMG Pictures

Original release
- Network: Dragon TV, Beijing TV
- Release: December 10, 2018 – February 1, 2024

Like a Flowing River (Chinese: 大江大河; pinyin: Dà Jiāng Dà Hé) is a 2018 Chinese period drama based on Ah Nai's novel River of Time (大江东去 IPA:[tâ.tɕjáŋ.tʊ́ŋ.tɕʰŷ]). It is directed by Kong Sheng and Huang Wei, and stars Wang Kai, Yang Shuo and Dong Zijian as budding entrepreneurs who take advantage of the economic reforms being rolled out in 1970s China.

The drama, a celebration of 40 years of China's reform and opening up, was split into two parts. The first part ran for 45 episodes, and aired on Dragon TV and Beijing TV beginning December 10, 2018. The second part began airing on Dragon TV and Zhejiang TV on December 20, 2020.

== Cast ==
=== Main ===
- Wang Kai as Song Yunhui, a naturally gifted man who comes from a family oppressed by the government, since it didn't belong to the peasant class prior to the establishment of PRC. As such, it was difficult for him to rise in the existing system. He grabs hold of the opportunity of the resumption of traditional examination based on academics and eventually becomes a technical engineer.
- Yang Shuo as Lei Dongbao, who is resolute and efficient and comes from a military background. During China's Rural Reform, he leads his whole village in following the government initiatives. However, along the way, he realizes he is tied down by his limited knowledge and world view.
- Dong Zijian as Yang Xun, a self-employed man who scrambles for every little business opportunity, and undergoes several failures, before finally attaining his own business and property.

=== Supporting ===
- Tong Yao as Song Yunping, Song Yunhui's sister and Lei Dongbao's wife. A gentle, kind and courageous woman who provides endless support and warmth to her brother and husband. She dies later due to hemorrhaging complications during childbirth.
- Zhou Fang as Cheng Faiyan, Song Yunhui's first wife. She has a daughter with him.
- Yang Caiyu as Liang Sishen, Song Yunhui's pen-pal and close confidante. A beautiful, independent and confident lady. She studied in the USA from a young age and later becomes a business executive. Teenager portrayed by Zhao Yunzhuo.
- Yang Lixin as Clerk Shui
- Zhao Yang as Yu Shanqing
- Wang Hong as Lei Tugen
- Wang Yongquan as Old Clerk
- Tian Lei as Shi Hongwei
- Li Baoan as Song Jishan, Song Yunhui's father
- Qian Jie as Song Yunhui's mother

== Production ==
=== Shooting ===
The "Jin Ling County (晋陵县)" in Like a Flowing River was filmed in Nanjing. As the Yeshan iron ore plant in Nanjing retains the 1970s to 1980s appearance, the building was used for a variety of scenes; scenes of bookstores, photo studios, guest house, government offices, etc. were all shot there. The drama also filmed in Nanjing Yuntai Shan Pyrite Co., Ltd., also in Nanjing, where the crew filmed the mine dormitory, canteen, town hall and children's school, where Song Yunhui taught. The Ministry of Chemical Industry was filmed at Nanjing Art Institute. In order to create a more authentic "Xiao Lei Jia Village (小雷家村)", the crew planted a large tree at the location a year in advance, and spent more than 20 days in the village to shoot.

It is reported that the money used to "restore the texture of the age" was double the amount used in other TV series, with ultra-wide format used for the first time. For the many snow scenes, the crew used naturally degradable paper foam instead of the cheaper magnesium sulfate or aluminum, citing that the old way produced pollution. Actor Wang Kai reportedly lost weight to achieve the look the impoverished main character, while Yang Shuo gained weight to become the well-off secretary of the village.

Principal photography began on February 23, 2018 in Jing County, Xuancheng, Anhui and ended on June 26.

=== Casting and release ===
At Tencent Video VVision Conference held on November 8, 2017, Like a Flowing River was announced, with confirmation of its television broadcast on Dragon TV as a tribute to the 40th anniversary of the reform and opening up. Beijing TV also announced its broadcast shortly after. Daylight Entertainment announced Wang Kai as Song Yunhui and Yang Shuo as Lei Dongbao on the 13th and 14th respectively. On December 6, Dong Zijian was cast as Yang Xun.

== Original soundtrack ==
Like a Flowing River Original Soundtrack (OST)

Soundtrack album by Various artists
- Released: July 2, 2016
- Genre: Mandopop; Instrumental
- Language: Mandarin
- Label: Mai Tong Music
- Producer: Dong Yingda

The main composer of the Like a Flowing River OST is Dong Yingda, who also worked on The Great River (2018) and Ming Dynasty (2019). On December 4, the show held a press conference in Shanghai, and announced that the promotion song of the same name would be sung by Wang Kai.

大江大河 电视剧原声带
No.	Title	Singers/Composer	Length
1.	"Like a Flowing River (大江大河)"	Wang Kai	2:48
2.	"Time goes by (时间走过)"	Lei Jia	2:42
3.	"Our Life is a River (我们的生活是一条河)"	Gu Qing	2:04
4.	"The Beauty of First Love (初恋的美好)"	Dong Yingda	0:47
5.	"Like a Flowing River Theme variation (大江大河主题变奏)"	Dong Yingda	2:37
6.	"Quantitative hope (量地的希望)"	Dong Yingda	0:52
7.	"Life Outlook - Light version (人生展望 淡版)"	Dong Yingda	0:40
8.	"Arrogant Times (时代骄子)"	Dong Yingda	1:00
9.	"Great Men Speak (伟人讲话 大江大河片头)" (Opening theme)	Dong Yingda	0:59
10.	"Xiao Lei Village Reform (小雷家改革)"	Dong Yingda	1:04
11.	"Xiao Lei Village Tractor (小雷家拖拉机)"	Dong Yingda

== Reception ==
=== Ratings ===
- Highest ratings are marked in red, lowest ratings are marked in blue

Broadcast date	Beijing TV CSM52 ratings			Dragon TV CSM52 ratings		
Broadcast date	Ratings (%)	Audience share (%)	Rank	Ratings (%)	Audience share (%)	Rank
2018.12.10	0.971	3.48	1	0.527	1.89	4
2018.12.11	1.035	3.71	1	0.513	1.84	4
2018.12.12	1.041	3.85	1	0.722	2.68	2
2018.12.13	1.159	4.25	1	0.791	2.9	2
2018.12.14	1.2	4.22	1	0.85	2.99	2
2018.12.15	1.104	3.92	1	0.735	2.61	2
2018.12.16	1.192	4.19	1	0.904	3.17	3
2018.12.17	1.246	4.6	1	0.919	3.56	2
2018.12.18	1. 276	4.69	1	0.781	2.84	3
2018.12.19	1.195	4.40	1	0.862	3.78	2
2018.12.20	1.214	4.39	1	0.838	3.03	2
2018.12.21	1.417	5.04	1	0.893	3.17	2
2018.12.22	1.248	4.35	1	0.931	3.25	2
2018.12.23	1.343	4.67	1	0.972	3.37	2
2018.12.24	1.374	5.01	1	0.902	3.29	2
2018.12.25	1.284	4.59	1	0.925	3.30	3
2018.12.26	1.326	4.72	1	0.989	3.52	3
2018.12.27	1.359	4.77	1	1.014	3.56	2
2018.12.28	1.346	4.7	1	0.967	3.38	2
2018.12.29	1.386	4.64	1	0.947	3.17	2
2018.12.30	1.318	4.42	1	0.971	3.25	2
2019.01.01	1.324	4.39	1	0.916	3.04	4
2019.01.02	1.419	4.99	1	0.963	3.39	3
2019.01.03	1.361	4.8	1	0.950	3.35	3
2019.01.04	1.380	4.71	1	0.956	3.26	2
Average ratings	1.262			0.873		

=== Awards and nominations ===
Award	Category	Nominated work	Result	Ref.
25th Shanghai Television Festival	Best Television Series		Won	
25th Shanghai Television Festival	Best Director	Kong Sheng, Huang Wei	Won	
25th Shanghai Television Festival	Best Adapted Screenplay	Yuan Keping, Tang Yao	Won	
25th Shanghai Television Festival	Best Actor	Wang Kai	Nominated	
25th Shanghai Television Festival	Best Supporting Actress	Tong Yao	Won	
25th Shanghai Television Festival	Best Cinematography		Nominated	
25th Shanghai Television Festival	Best Art Direction		Won	
Influence of Recreational Responsibilities Awards	TV Drama of the Year	Like a Flowing River	Won	
12th Tencent Video Star Awards	Top Ten Series	Like a Flowing River	Won	
Golden Bud - The Fourth Network Film And Television Festival	Best Actor	Wang Kai	Nominated	
Golden Bud - The Fourth Network Film And Television Festival	Best Actress	Tong Yao	Nominated	
30th China TV Golden Eagle Award	Outstanding Television Series	Like a Flowing River	Nominated	
30th China TV Golden Eagle Award	Best Director	Kong Sheng	Won	
30th China TV Golden Eagle Award	Best Actor	Wang Kai	Nominated	
30th China TV Golden Eagle Award	Best Actress	Tong Yao	Won	
30th China TV Golden Eagle Award	Best Screenwriter	Yuan Keping	Nominated	
30th China TV Golden Eagle Award	Best Cinematography	Lei Ming	Nominated	
30th China TV Golden Eagle Award	Best Original Soundtrack	Shi Jian Zou Guo	Nominated	
32nd Feitian Awards	Outstanding Television Series (Struggle Era)	Like a Flowing River	Won	
32nd Feitian Awards	Outstanding Director	Kong Sheng, Huang Wei	Nominated	
32nd Feitian Awards	Outstanding Actress	Tong Yao	Nominated	
