= My Girlfriend (TV series) =

- Genre: Romance; Comedy
- Based on: My Girlfriend by Wei Xiaobao
- Written by: Hu Xiaoshuai; Wei Xiaobao
- Directed by: Yu Zhongzhong
- Starring: Xu Weizhou; Qiao Xin
- Country of origin: China
- Original language: Mandarin
- No. of episodes: 28

Production
- Production companies: Youku Pictures; Liu Bai Entertainment

Original release
- Network: Youku; Mango TV
- Release: 8 October 2019 – 2019

My Girlfriend (Chinese: 我不能恋爱的女朋友; pinyin: Wǒ bùnéng liàn'ài de nǚ péngyǒu) is a 2019 Chinese romantic drama based on the novel of the same name by Wei Xiaobao, starring Xu Weizhou and Qiao Xin. The series airs on Youku from October 8, 2019.

== Synopsis ==
When Ding Xiaorou was 15 years old, some accidental misunderstanding had her believe that she would never find true love in her life. Until she met Chi Xin. Things happened and two young hearts got gradually drawn to each other.

The story is also about a man who is unable to carry an extraordinarily light woman. But through his insecurities, inevitably deflects his shortcomings.

== Cast ==
=== Main ===
Actor	Character	Introduction
Xu Weizhou	Chi Xin	TV Producer, always has a plan B, but "when it comes to loving you, I have no plan B".
Qiao Xin	Ding Xiaorou	A cute ordinary girl who's been single for 25 years since she was born. She was convinced that she would never find true love.

=== Supporting ===
Actor	Character	Introduction
Zhou Yixuan	Zheng Ze	Secret rich playboy.
Wang Jianing	Nan Sasa	Ding Xiaorou's best friend.
Wang Liang	Zhen Zheng	Loyal good guy who finds late love accidentally.
Zhang Muchen	He Mingzhu	
Ji Tianyu	Jiang Yuan	Chi Xin's ex-girlfriend, charming lady with a successful career.
Zhao Lingbin	Qi Ling	

== Production ==
The series began filming in April 2018 in Suzhou, and wrapped up in June 2018.

== Awards and nominations ==
Award	Category	Nominee	Results	Ref.
Golden Bud - The Fourth Network Film And Television Festival	Best Web Series	My Girlfriend	Nominated	
Golden Bud - The Fourth Network Film And Television Festival	Best Actor	Xu Weizhou	Nominated	
Golden Bud - The Fourth Network Film And Television Festival	Best Actress	Qiao Xin	Nominated	
