= 23rd Shanghai Television Festival =

Chinese TV awards ceremony in 2017

The 23rd Shanghai Television Festival ceremony would be held on June 12, 2017, to June 16, 2017.

== Winners and nominees ==
| Best Television Series: The Good Fellas; Hai Tang Yi Jiu; To Be a Better Man; Ode to Joy; Feather Flies To The Sky; Marshal Peng Dehuai; In the Name of People; A Love For Separation; Chinese Style Relationship; The Last Visa | Best Director: Shen Yan, Liu Haibo - Chinese Style Relationship; Kong Sheng, Jian Chuanhe - Ode to Joy; Li Lu - In the Name of People; Wang Jun - A Love For Separation; Wu Ding - Feather Flies To The Sky |
| Best Actor: Zhang Yi - Feather Flies To The Sky; Chen Jianbin - Chinese Style Relationship; Huang Lei - A Love For Separation; Sun Honglei - To Be a Better Man; Mark Chao - Eternal Love | Best Actress: Yin Tao - Feather Flies To The Sky; Hai Qing - A Love For Separation; Jiang Xin - Ode to Joy; Liu Tao - Ode to Joy; Ma Yili - Chinese Style Relationship |
| Best Supporting Actor: Wu Gang - In the Name of People; Jin Dong - Ode to Joy; Zhang Luyi - Sparrow; Zhang Zhigang - In the Name of People; Zhao Lixin - Chinese Style Relationship | Best Supporting Actress: Guan Xiaotong - To Be a Better Man; Dilraba Dilmurat - Eternal Love; Hu Jing - In the Name of People; Wang Ziwen - Ode to Joy; Yang Zi - Ode to Joy |
| Best Writing: Zhang Lei - Chinese Style Relationship; He Qing - A Love For Separation; Kun Jian - Feather Flies To The Sky; Yuan Zidan - Ode to Joy; Zhou Meisen - In the Name of People | |
