= Qiao Xin =

Chinese actress

- Born: November 23, 1993 (age 32); Harbin, Heilongjiang, China
- Other name: Bridgette Qiao
- Education: Central Academy of Drama
- Occupation: Actress
- Years active: 2012–present
- Agent: Tongle Entertainment (童乐影视)
- Spouse: Lai Bolin (m. 2023)

Chinese name
- Traditional Chinese: 喬欣
- Simplified Chinese: 乔欣
Transcriptions
Standard Mandarin
- Hanyu Pinyin: Qiáo xīn

Qiao Xin (Chinese: 乔欣, born 23 November 1993), also known as Bridgette Qiao, is a Chinese actress who graduated from the Central Academy of Drama. Qiao is recognized for her role as Guan Ju'er in Ode to Joy (2016) and Ode to Joy 2 (2017).

== Career ==
In 2012, Qiao made her acting debut in the television series Qi Jiu He Kai.

In 2015, Qiao gained recognition for her role in the acclaimed historical wuxia drama Nirvana in Fire. The following year, Qiao rose to fame for her role as Guan Ju'er in the metropolitan drama Ode to Joy. She also starred in the historical fantasy drama Legend of Nine Tails Fox, receiving positive reviews for her performance.

In 2017, Qiao reprised her role in the second season of Ode to Joy; her new pairing with actor Deng Lun received positive reviews from the audience. The same year, she starred in the second season of Nirvana in Fire, playing a totally new character from the first season.

In 2019, Qiao starred in the youth workplace drama In Youth as the female lead. The same year, she starred in the romance comedy drama My Girlfriend.

== Filmography ==
=== Film ===
Year	English title	Chinese title	Role	Notes
2016	The Match	击战	Bai Xiaoyu	
2021	Cloudy Mountain	峰爆	Xu Yimiao	originally named "Infinite Depth" (无限深度)
2021	Embrace Again	穿过寒冬拥抱你	Jun Jun	

=== Television series ===
Year	English title	Chinese title	Role	Network	Notes
2013	The Distance of Love	到爱的距离	Xiu Xiu	Shandong TV	
2014	Qi Jiu He Kai	七九河开	Man Zhu (young)	Xiaxi TV	
2015	Nirvana in Fire	琅琊榜	Yuwen Nian	Beijing TV, Dragon TV	
2016	How Much Love Can Be Repeated	多少爱，可以重来	Qin Xiaoyue	CCTV	
2016	Legend of Nine Tails Fox	青丘狐传说	Axiu	Hunan TV	
2016	Ode to Joy	欢乐颂	Guan Ju'er	Dragon TV, Zhejiang TV	
2017	Ode to Joy 2	欢乐颂2	Guan Ju'er	Dragon TV, Zhejiang TV	
2017	Nirvana in Fire 2	琅琊榜2	Xun Anru	Beijing TV, Dragon TV	
2018	The Road of Light	诚忠堂	Yang Yiyi	CCTV	
2019	In Youth	趁我们还年轻	Lin Ziyu	Dragon TV	
2019	My Girlfriend	我不能恋爱的女朋友	Ding Xiaorou	Youku	
2020	Cross Fire	穿越火线	Tao Zi	Tencent	Cameo (ep. 1)
2020	Sisyphus	在劫难逃	Sun Xiaomeng	iQiyi	
2020	You Complete Me	小风暴之时间的玫瑰	Lin Wo	Tencent, WeTV	
2020	Ordinary Glory	平凡的荣耀	An Pingyi	Dragon TV, Zhejiang TV	
2021	Song of Youth	玉楼春	Sun Yourong	Youku	
2021	Dream Garden	沉睡花园	Xiao Xiao	Mango TV, Hunan TV	
2021	Crying and Laughing Scholar	喷笑书香	Wu Yuwen	iQiyi, Tencent, WeTV	Drama was filmed in 2013-2014
2022	The Autumn Ballad	嫣语赋	Qiu Yan	Tencent, WeTV	
TBA	Imagination Season	创想季	Wang Ruoyu	Beijing TV	
TBA	Winter Night	在你的冬夜里闪耀	Zheng Daqian	Tencent	

=== Television show ===
Year	English title	Chinese title	Role	Notes
2017	Date! Super Star	约吧！大明星	Cast member	
2017	Flowers On Trip	旅途的花样	Cast member (ep. 8-13)	
2017	Challenge League	挑战者联盟	Guest (ep. 6)	
2017	Day Day Up	天天向上	Guest (20170728 episode)	with Wang Yanlin, Huang Yi & Shu Chang
2018	The Inn Season 2	亲爱的客栈2	Guest (ep. 6-7)	with Yang Zi
2019	Me and My Manager	我和我的经纪人	Cast member	
2019	Day Day Up	天天向上	Guest (20190421 episode)	with Timmy Xu & Li Guang Jie
2019	Happy Camp	Guest (20190810 episode)	快乐大本营	with Wei Daxun, Xiao Zhan, Wang Yibo, Guo Xiaodong & Wu Jinyan
2020	Summer Surf Shop	夏日冲浪店	Cast member	
2020	Happy Camp	快乐大本营	Guest (20200128 episode)	with Timmy Xu, Tan Songyun, Darren Wang, Patrick Shih & Li Xueqin
2021	Day Day Up	天天向上	Guest (20210103 episode)	with Lin Yun, Henry Huo, Mu Ziyang & Jolin Jin
2021	The Romance	恋恋剧中人	Cast member	partnered with Timmy Xu
2021	Happy Camp	快乐大本营	Guest (2021004 episode)	with Timmy Xu, Jam Hsiao, Wang Qiang
2021	Work For Dream	了不起的打工人	Cast Member	

=== Music video ===
Year	English title	Chinese title	Singer
2019	"Cactus"	仙人掌	Xiong Ziqi

== Discography ==
=== Singles ===
Year	English title	Chinese title	Album	Notes
2016	"Breaking out of the Cocoon"	破茧	Ode to Joy OST	
2016	"There Will Be Happiness Waiting for You"	总有幸福在等你	Ode to Joy OST	With Jiang Xin, Liu Tao, Wang Ziwen and Yang Zi
2017	"I Want To Be Your Crazy Girl"	想做你的瘋女孩	Ode to Joy 2 OST	
2017	"Us"	我们	Ode to Joy 2 OST	With Jiang Xin, Liu Tao, Wang Ziwen and Yang Zi
2017	"Date! Super Star"	约吧大明星	Date! Super Star OST	
2020	"Heart Warms Heart Equals to the World"	心暖心等于世界		Collab with various artists
2020	"All the way till dawn"	一直到黎明		Collab with various artists
2020	"Freedom"		Summer Surf Shop OST	with Huang Xuan, Elvis Han & Huang Minghao
2020	"Love Clarity"	爱清晰	You Complete Me OST	
2021	"Summer Love"	见到你的盛夏	The Romance OST	with Timmy Xu
2022	"Pansy's Flower Language"	三色堇的花语	The Autumn Ballad OST	

== Awards and nominations ==
Year	Award	Category	Nominated work	Result	Ref.
2016	5th iQiyi All-Star Carnival	Best Newcomer (TV)	Ode to Joy	Won	
2017	Toutiao Awards	Lively Star of the Year	—N/a	Won	
2017	9th China TV Drama Awards	Most Promising Actress	Ode to Joy 2	Won	
2019	China Entertainment Industry Summit (Golden Pufferfish Awards)	Most Promising Commercially Valuable Artist	—N/a	Won	
2019	Golden Bud - The Fourth Network Film And Television Festival	Best Actress	In Youth, My Girlfriend	Nominated	
