= To Be a Better Man =

- Genre: Drama; Romance
- Written by: Li Xiao; Yu Miao; Zhang Yingji
- Directed by: Zhang Xiaobo
- Starring: Sun Honglei; Jiang Shuying; Wang Yaoqing; Che Xiao; Lay Zhang; Guan Xiaotong
- Country of origin: China
- Original language: Chinese
- No. of episodes: 42

Production
- Running time: 45 minutes (approx.)
- Production companies: Linmon Pictures; LeEco; Yida Media; Changjiang Culture
- Budget: US$23 million

Original release
- Network: Jiangsu Television, Zhejiang Television
- Release: 31 May – 22 June 2016

To Be a Better Man (Chinese: 好先生) is a 2016 Chinese television series produced by LeEco and directed by Zhang Xiaobo. It stars Sun Honglei, Jiang Shuying, Wao Yaoqing, Che Xiao, Lay Zhang and Guan Xiaotong. The series was aired on Jiangsu TV and Zhejiang TV from 31 May to 22 June 2016.

== Synopsis ==
Lu Yuan is a Chinese chef who pursued his career in the United States and became a three-Michelin-star chef. He is known for his reckless and unconventional behavior, although he demonstrates loyalty, kindness, and honesty toward those he loves. Following a fatal car accident involving his close friend, Lu Yuan returns to China with his friend's remains.

Now returning to China, Lu Yuan initially has three goals. First, he wants to bring the ashes of his friend, who died in the car accident, back to China and let them rest in peace. Second, he wants to return his best friend’s seventeen-year-old daughter Jia He to her birth mother, before finding a remote place and committing suicide. However unexpectedly, he met the person he least wants to see and becomes entangled with both his unresolved and new relationships.

== Cast ==
- Sun Honglei as Lu Yuan
- Jiang Shuying as Jiang Lai
- Wang Yaoqing as Jiang Haokun
- Che Xiao as Gan Jing
- Lay Zhang as Xiao Cai
- Guan Xiaotong as Peng Jiahe
- Dong Yong as Peng Hai
- Wan Qian as Xu Li
- Feng Jiayi as Manager Hui Jing

== Soundtrack ==
Soundtrack album
No.	Title	Writer(s)	Singer	Length
1.	"Mr. Right" (Opening theme song)	Ke Ke		2:03
2.	"Far Road (路远)" (Ending theme song)	Cai Kejun	Zhang Lei	5:24
3.	"Forget About Her (忘了她)"	Bi Feng	Perhat Khaliq	5:00
4.	"Be Good (好好的)"	Bi Feng	Ceng Di	4:24
5.	"Song About Love"	Li Yuxi	Li Yuxi	4:11
6.	"Grow"	Li Yuxi	Li Yuxi	4:36

== Reception ==
The drama is both a critical and commercial success. It received acclaim for its heart-warming and realistic storyline, strong performance of its leads as well as cinematography and costume design. According to NetEase, the drama discusses from a detached point of view on searching for the true meaning of life in a society where people blindly chase after materialistic wants. It also touches on the importance of trust, family and love.

=== Ratings ===
Broadcast	Episode	Zhejiang TV CSM52 ratings			Jiangsu TV CSM52 ratings		
Broadcast	Episode	Ratings (%)	Audience share (%)	Rank	Ratings (%)	Audience share (%)	Rank
2016.5.31	1	1.000	2.843	3	0.922	2.613	5
2016.6.1	2-3	0.726	2.24	4	0.705	2.174	5
2016.6.2	4-5	0.747	2.25	5	0.839	2.523	3
2016.6.3	6-7	0.867	2.59	4	0.764	2.26	5
2016.6.4	8-9	1.081	3.39	2	0.794	2.52	3
2016.6.5	10	0.980	2.93	2	0.920	2.89	3
2016.6.6	11-12	0.955	2.89	4	1.046	3.16	3
2016.6.7	13-14	1.052	3.20	4	1.124	3.42	3
2016.6.8	15-16	1.070	3.30	3	1.100	3.39	2
2016.6.9	17-18	0.968	3.04	3	1.133	3.56	2
2016.6.10	19-20	1.092	3.33	3	1.092	3.30	2
2016.6.11	21-22	1.186	3.43	2	1.094	3.17	3
2016.6.12	23	1.202	3.58	2	1.200	3.56	3
2016.6.13	24-25	1.594	4.61	3	1.250	3.70	4
2016.6.14	26-27	1.312	3.85	2	1.224	3.59	3
2016.6.15	28-29	1.405	4.23	2	1.245	3.74	3
2016.6.16	30-31	1.214	3.83	2	1.196	3.77	3
2016.6.17	32-33	1.320	4.09	2	1.237	3.77	3
2016.6.18	34-35	1.162	3.81	3	1.464	4.50	2
2016.6.19	36	1.381	4.20	3	1.469	4.66	2
2016.6.20	37-38	1.597	4.93	1	1.555	4.49	2
2016.6.21	39-40	1.738	5.42	1	1.586	4.94	2
2016.6.22	41-42	1.752	5.38	1	1.657	5.09	2
Average ratings		1.169			1.172		

- Highest ratings are marked in red, lowest ratings are marked in blue

== Awards and nominations ==
Award	Category	Nominated work	Result	Ref.
11th National Top-Notch Television Award Ceremony	Outstanding Television Series	To Be a Better Man	Won	
22nd Huading Awards	Best Director	Zhang Xiaobo	Nominated	
22nd Huading Awards	Best Screenwriter	Li Xiao, Yu Miao, Zhang Yingji	Won	
22nd Huading Awards	Best Actor	Sun Honglei	Nominated	
22nd Huading Awards	Best Actress (Contemporary)	Jiang Shuying	Nominated	
22nd Huading Awards	Best Supporting Actor	Wang Yaoqing	Nominated	
22nd Huading Awards	Best Supporting Actress	Guan Xiaotong	Nominated	
22nd Huading Awards	Best New Actor	Lay Zhang	Nominated	
22nd Huading Awards	Top 10 Dramas	To Be a Better Man	Won	
23rd Shanghai Television Festival	Best Television Series	To Be a Better Man	Nominated	
23rd Shanghai Television Festival	Best Actor	Sun Honglei	Nominated	
23rd Shanghai Television Festival	Best Supporting Actress	Guan Xiaotong	Won	

== International broadcast ==
Channel	Place	Date	Time	Notes
Jiangsu Television; Zhejiang Television	China	May 31, 2016	Everyday 19:30-21:15	
Star Chinese Channel	Hong Kong; Singapore; Malaysia; Canada; United States	May 31, 2016		International Version
VTV3	Vietnam	January 18, 2017	Monday-Friday 12:00	
