= Yang Shuo (actor) =

Chinese actor (born 1983)

- Born: 2 January 1983 (age 43); Yichun, Heilongjiang, China
- Education: Central Academy of Drama
- Occupation: Actor
- Years active: 2004–present
- Spouse: Wang Liwen
- Children: Yang Yuchen, Yang Yuxi

Chinese name
- Traditional Chinese: 楊爍
- Simplified Chinese: 杨烁
Transcriptions

Yang Shuo (Chinese: 杨烁, born 2 January 1983) is a Chinese actor. He is known for his role as Bao Yifan in the drama Ode to Joy.

== Filmography ==
=== Film ===
Year	English title	Chinese title	Role	Notes
2012	Guns and Roses	黄金大劫案		
2012	Thousand Years Love	云之锦		

=== Television series ===
Year	English title	Chinese title	Role	Notes
2004	The century begins with a love	爱在左，情在右	Gao Feng	
2009	Mission for Peace	和平使命	Lin Hu	
2009	Tears for Happiness	幸福的眼泪	Shi Lei	
2009	The Line	生死线	Si Daofeng	
2010		天地民心	Bao Sheng	
2011	I'm A Special Soldier	我是特种兵	Ma Yunfei	
2011	Knife Fighter	尖刀战士	Chen Ting	
2011	Cold Steel	遍地狼烟	Mu Liangfeng	
2012	Ant Race's Struggle	蚁族的奋斗	Zhao Rongsheng	
2012	Lipstick	蝴蝶行动	Gao Zhiyuan	Guest appearance
2012	Growth Story	成长	Luo Tianyang	
2012		一门三司令	Yang Tiandong	Cameo
2012	Hot Girl	麻辣女兵	Ah Qin	Guest appearance
2012	Sharp Arrow Operation	利箭行动	Zhao Chunsheng	Cameo
2013	Red Dust	滚滚红尘	Huang Long	
2013	Stop Doing	暗花	Jiang Yucheng	
2013	The Hero of Swallow	决战燕子门	Yanzi Lisan	
2013	The Spies	穷追不舍	Zhong Tiehan	
2014	The Fake Hero	冒牌英雄	Liu Bangzi	
2014		大村官	Wu Cheng	Cameo
2014	Warriors of the City	勇士之城	Liu Shiming	
2014	Sword Family Women	刀客家族的女人	Yu Hualong	
2014	Super Partner	神犬奇兵	Guo Youdong	
2014		洪流	Gong Jintao	
2015		同门兄弟	Zhao Jinlong	
2015	Surviving in Destiny	绝路逢生	Cha Fuding	
2015	The Journey of Flower	花千骨	Tan Fan	Special appearance
2015	Starry Night	隐秘动机	Han Wuyang	
2015		我叫刘传说	Lin Luoxiao	Cameo
2015	The Dream Come True	美梦成真	Lin Lishu	
2015	Narrow Road	狭路	Lin Wuyang	
2015	Boys to Men	爸爸快长大	Deliveryman	Cameo
2016	Before Dawn	潜伏在黎明之前	Hu Shouan	
2016	Stairway to Stardom	重生之名流巨星	Chen Ding	Guest appearance
2016	Ode to Joy	欢乐颂	Bao Yifan	Guest appearance
2017		惊蛰	Lu Kai	
2017	Modern Matchmaker	大话红娘	Gao Wenbo	
2017	Police Story	江城警事	Wang Xinwei	
2017	Ode to Joy 2	欢乐颂2	Bao Yifan	
2018	Blade Attacking	利刃出击	Liu Wen	
2018	The Dream and the Glory	那些年，我们正年轻	Zhang Lijun	
2018	Like a Flowing River	大江大河	Lei Dongbao	
2019	Hope All is Well with Us	我们都要好好的	Xiang Qian	
2019	See You Again	时间都知道	Yi Pei	
2019	Return the World to You	归还世界给你	Lu Zhun	
2020	Green Water and Green Hills With a Smile	绿水青山带笑颜	Xu Han	
2021		爱的理想生活	Bai Xiangwen	
2021	Medal of the Republic	功勋	Lao Ma	
TBA	The Love Without a Trace	爱无痕	Tang Licheng	
TBA	The Left Ear	左耳	Zhao Haisheng	Special appearance
TBA	The Fated General	大漠骠骑—霍去病	Hao Ming	Cameo
TBA	Like a Flowing River 2	大江大河2	Lei Dongbao	
TBA	Astringent Girl	涩女郎		

== Awards and nominations ==
Year	Award	Category	Nominated work	Result	Ref.
2015	17th Huading Awards	Best Actor (Period Drama)	Sword Family Women	Won	
2019	4th China Quality Television Drama Ceremony	Outstanding Performance Quality Star	—N/a	Won	
2019	6th The Actors of China Award Ceremony	Best Actor (Sapphire Category)	Like a Flowing River	Nominated	
