= Sun Honglei =

Chinese actor

- Born: 16 August 1970 (age 56); Harbin, Heilongjiang, China
- Education: Central Academy of Drama (Music Class) (1995–1997)
- Occupation: Actor
- Years active: 1998–present
- Spouse: Wang Jundi (m. 2014)
- Parents: Sun Zhenshan (father); Chen Yiqin (mother)

Chinese name
- Traditional Chinese: 孫紅雷
- Simplified Chinese: 孙红雷
Transcriptions
Standard Mandarin
- Hanyu Pinyin: Sūn Hóngléi

Sun Honglei (Chinese: 孙红雷; born 16 August 1970) is a Chinese actor, known for portraying tough, earthy characters. He is known for his roles in films The Road Home (1999), Zhou Yu's Train (2003), Forever Enthralled (2008), The Warring State (2011), and in TV series Zheng Fu (2003), Lurk (2008), which earned him the Best Actor at the Feitian Award, the Golden Eagle Award and the Magnolia Award, The Road We Have Taken (2009), Men (2011), and To Be a Better Man (2016).

== Early life ==
Sun was born in Harbin, Heilongjiang, on 16 August 1970. Sun developed an interest in acting and performances at a young age. He often skipped school to learn breakdancing on the streets and eventually gave up his studies entirely to pursue dancing as a career, eventually performing with a modern dance troupe for several years. Later, Sun became a popular local nightclub singer and host before going into acting. In 1995, Sun attended the Central Academy of Drama, where he graduated in 1997. He has since gone on to star in numerous TV dramas and films, winning many awards for his stage work. Sun is probably best known to Asian cinema fans for his supporting performances in Seven Swords, Triangle and Blood Brothers. Since October 2011, Sun has played the starring role in the popular Chinese series 'Nanren Bang' (男人帮), portraying urban romantic life from a male perspective.

== Acting career ==
In 1998, Sun played a minor character in the drama Never Close The Eye adapted from Hai Yan's novel of the same name. In 1999, Sun starred in his first film, The Road Home, and officially entered the film industry.

From 2001 to 2002, the TV dramas Like Fog, Like Rain, Like Wind and Behind the Glamour were broadcast successively, gradually making the audience familiar with his portrayal of the elder brother role. He gained further recognition with his role as a cold-blooded murderer in the crime drama Conquer.

Sun won his first major award at the Beijing College Student Film Festival with his role in the film Zhou Yu's Train.

In 2005, Sun co-starred in Tsui Hark's martial arts film Seven Swords.

In 2006, Sun headlined the television series Halfway Couple, which earned high ratings and acclaimed. Sun won the Best Actor at the Shanghai Television Festival for his performance.

In 2008, Sun starred alongside Zhang Ziyi in the arthouse film Forever Enthralled.

In 2009, Sun starred in the spy war drama Lurk which was a major hit in China. The series propelled him as one of the top television actors in China, earning him Best Actor accolades at the Shanghai Television Festival, Flying Apsaras Awards and China TV Golden Eagle Award. The same year, he starred in the epic historical drama The Road We Have Taken based on the award-winning novel of the same name by Jiang Qitao; which earned high acclaim when it aired.

In 2010, Sun starred in the romantic comedy film If You Are the One 2 directed by Feng Xiaogang. The film was released on June 22 and topped the weekly box office chart in its first week with a revenue of 25 million yuan.

In 2011, Sun starred in the historical film The Warring States as military strategist Sun Bin.

In 2015, Sun starred in the youth film The Ark of Mr. Chow directed by Xiao Yang.

On January 15, 2016, the comedy-mystery film Royal Treasure, starring Sun Honglei, was released. The film's box office exceeded 100 million yuan within six days of its release.

In February 2021, Sun Honglei provided the voice for the character Haifangzhu in the film The Yinyang Master.

In October 2022, Literature and Art in the War of Resistance, the first original documentary drama by the China National Theatre Company, premiered at the National Centre for the Performing Arts Drama Theatre. Sun Honglei played the role of Mr. Jinshan and admitted in an interview that the role was quite a challenge.

== Personal life ==
On 1 October 2014, Sun announced he and Wang Jundi (王骏迪) are tying the knot and the wedding was held in Paris. Their daughter was born on 16 December 2017.

== Filmography ==
=== Film ===
Year	English title	Chinese title	Role	Notes
1999	The Road Home	我的父亲母亲	Luo Yusheng / narrator	
1999	Sorry Baby	没完没了	Drunk driver	cameo
2000	Happy Times	幸福时光	motel guest	cameo
2002	Zhou Yu's Train	怒江魂	Zeng Lama	
2005	Manhole Cover	井盖儿	Tang Daxing	
2005	Seven Swords	七剑	Fire-Wind (Fenghuo Liancheng)	
2006	Invisible Target	上海红美丽	Cheng Xiwang	
2007	Blood Brothers	天堂口	Brother Hong	cameo
2007	Triangle	铁三角	Mo Zhongyuan	
2007	Mongol	蒙古王	Jamukha / Zha Muhe	
2008	Forever Enthralled	梅兰芳	Qiu Rubai	
2008	The Underdog Knight	硬汉	Love Rival	
2009	The Founding of a Republic	建国大业	reporter	cameo
2009	My Fair Gentleman	窈窕绅士	Zeng Tiangao	
2009	A Simple Noodle Story	三枪拍案惊奇	Zhang San	
2010	If You Are the One 2	非诚勿扰2	Li Xiangshan	
2010	Welcome to Shama Town	决战刹马镇	Tang Gaopeng	
2011	The Warring States	战国	Sun Bin	
2012	I Do	我愿意	Yang Nianhua	
2012	Lethal Hostage	边境风云	Drug Dealer	
2013	Drug War	毒战	Zhang Lei	
2013	Silent Witness	全民目击	Lin Tai	
2014	One Step Away	触不可及	Fu Jingnian	
2014	When a Peking Family Meets Aupair	洋妞到我家		
2015	The Ark of Mr. Chow	少年班	Zhou Zhiyong	
2016	Royal Treasure	极限挑战之皇家宝藏	Himself	

=== Television series ===
Year	English title	Chinese title	Role	Notes
2000	Never Close the Eye	永不瞑目	Jianjun	
2000	Love Story in Shanghai	像雾像雨又像风	Ah Lai	
2001	Police Family	警察世家	Liu Jianshe	
2001	Black Triangle	黑三角	Cheng Jiang	
2001	The Sun is not Downhill	太阳不落山	Lu Xianhe	
2002	Behind the Glamour	浮华背后	Gao Jinlin	
2003	Conquer	征服	Liu Huaqiang	
2003	Walking Past Happiness	走过幸福	Chen Yan	
2003	Loud Military Anthem	军歌嘹亮	Gao Dashan	
2004	I Am Not A Hero	我非英雄	Chen Fei	
2005	Rush Year 1937	刀锋1937	Zheng Shusen	
2006	Fan's Mansion	范府大院	Guo Caisan	
2006	Halfway Couples	半路夫妻	Guan Jun	
2007	Greatest Worker	大工匠	Yang Laosan	
2008	Landing, Please Turn On Your Phone	落地，请打开手机	Shen Kang	
2009	Lurk	潜伏	Yu Zecheng	
2009	The Road We Have Taken	人间正道是沧桑	Yang Liqing	
2011	Men	男人帮	Gu Xiaobai	
2014	A Hero	一代枭雄	He Futang	
2014	The Young Doctor	青年医生	Liu Yibai	
2014	The Legendary Sniper	二炮手	Zei Jiu	
2016	To Be a Better Man	好先生	Lu Yuan	also Artistic Director
2017	Game of Hunting	猎场	Liu Liangti	Cameo
2019	Over the Sea I Come to You	带着爸爸去留学	Dad	
2020	New World	新世界	Jin Hai	
2021	Crime Crackdown	扫黑风暴	Li Chengyang	

== Awards ==
Year	Award	Category	Nominated work	Ref.
2003	10th Beijing College Student Film Festival	Best Actor	Zhou Yu's Train	
2007	13th Shanghai Television Festival	Best Actor	Halfway Couple	
2008	2nd Asian Film Awards	Best Supporting Actor	Mongol	
2009	15th Shanghai Television Festival	Best Actor	Lurk	
2009	27th Flying Apsaras Awards	Outstanding Actor	Lurk	
2010	25th China TV Golden Eagle Award	Best Actor	Lurk	
2010	25th China TV Golden Eagle Award	Best Performing Arts Award	Lurk	
2010	25th China TV Golden Eagle Award	Audience's Choice for Actor	Lurk	
2013	1st China International Film Festival London	Best Actor	Silent Witness	
2015	52nd Grand Bell Awards	Best Foreign Actor	—N/a	
