= The Road We Have Taken =

2009 Chinese historical drama television series directed by Zhang Li

- 人间正道是沧桑
- Genre: historical drama
- Created by: Jiangsu Broadcast Media Group
- Written by: Jiang Qitao (江奇涛)
- Directed by: Zhang Li
- Starring: Huang Zhizhong (黃志忠), Sun Honglei (孫紅雷), Rolling Zhang Heng (张恒), Michelle Ke Lan (柯藍)
- Ending theme: Fideism (信仰)
- Country of origin: China
- Original language: Chinese
- No. of episodes: 50

Production
- Producer: Shi weiping (石卫平)
- Running time: 45 minutes (approx.)

Original release
- Network: CCTV (央視); Jiangsu TV (江苏卫视)
- Release: June 2 – June 18, 2009

The Road We Have Taken (simplified Chinese: 人间正道是沧桑; traditional Chinese: 人間正道是滄桑), also known in short by its fans as simply "The Road" (正道) or "to go through all the vicissitudes" (滄桑), is a highly popular 2009 Chinese TV series produced by Jiangsu Broadcast Media Group.

The series is directed by Zhang Li, and is based on the award-winning novel of the same name by Jiang Qitao (江奇涛).

== Story ==
The series is about from 1925 to 1949, focuses on three children of a big family in Liling (醴陵) county, Hunan province (湖南) and their search for a political path in the chaos of 20th century China. Their life is set against a number of significant historic events, such as First United Front, Second United Front, the War of Second Sino-Japanese War (1937–45), Chinese Civil War and the foundation of the People's Republic of China.

== Receptions ==
The Road We Have Taken received high praise from TV audiences. Many rated the series highly, calling it "a milestone in Chinese TV productions" for the innovative break-away from the traditional style of war and historical dramas. The series' recreation of realistic battlefields and history was also praised by many.
