= Jia Le Channel =

Singapore television channel

- Country: Singapore
- Broadcast area: Singapore
- Headquarters: Singapore

Programming
- Language(s): Chinese (Mandarin, Hokkien), Korean
- Picture format: 1080i (HDTV)

Ownership
- Owner: Singtel

History
- Launched: 29 August 2011 (Singapore)

Links
- Website: Site

Jia Le Channel (Chinese: 佳樂台; pinyin: Jiālè Tái) is a 24-hour Chinese and Hokkien language/dialect television network, broadcasting on the Singtel TV IPTV television service. Its content includes Chinese and Hokkien language programming, as well as foreign programs targeted at Chinese viewers. Jia Le Channel available Broadcast in Singapore via Singtel TV on Channel 502 and Jia Le Channel Video On Demand.

== Availability ==
Country	Network		Channel SD	Channel HD	Quality	VOD	Channel VOD
Singapore	IPTV	Singtel TV	---	502	HD	YES	"Yellow" button of Ch 502
