= Macau International Television Festival =

Macau International Television Festival 澳门国际电视节
- Awarded for: Excellence in Television
- Country: Macau
- First award: 2010
- Website: http://tv.mtm.mo/

The Macau International Television Festival (Chinese: 澳门国际电视节) is an international television festival that takes place in Macau, China. It is jointly held by the Macau-Television-Media Association of Macau and China Television Artists Association. It is held in conjunction with the Macau International Movie Festival. Its main category is the Golden Lotus Awards.

== Categories ==
=== Recurring ===
- Best Television Drama / Outstanding Television Drama (最佳电视剧奖 / 优秀电视剧大奖)
- Best Director (最佳导演奖)
- Best Writing (最佳编剧奖)
- Best Actor (最佳男演员奖)
- Best Actress (最佳女演员奖)
- Best Supporting Actor (最佳男配角奖)
- Best Supporting Actress (最佳女配角奖)
- Best Web Drama (优秀网络剧大奖)
- Best Television Producer (最佳电视制片人奖)
- Best Television Host (最佳电视节目主持人奖)
- Best Variety Program (最佳电视综艺节目奖)

=== Non-recurring ===
- Outstanding Producer (优秀制片人)
- Director Artistic Outstanding Contribution Award (导演艺术杰出贡献奖)
- Best Television OST Singer (最佳电视剧歌曲演唱大奖)
- Best Animation (最佳动漫奖)
- International Culture Contribution Award (国际文化贡献奖)
- Best TV Special (最佳专题片大奖)
- Best Documentary (最佳纪录片大奖)
- China Television Film Industry Development Contribution Award (中国影视产业发展贡献奖)

== Winners ==
=== 2010 ===
#	Category	Winner	Work	Ref.
1st	Best Television Producer	Wang Hui	Xian Hua Duo Duo	

=== 2012 ===
#	Category	Winner	Work	Ref.
3rd	Best Drama	The Legend of Zhen Huan		
3rd	Best Director	Zheng Xiaolong	The Legend of Zhen Huan	
3rd	Best Actor	Zhang Jiayi	The Brink	
3rd	Best Actress	Sun Li	The Legend of Zhen Huan	
3rd	Best Television Host	Hua Shao, Eleven Yiyi		
3rd	Best Variety Program	The Voice of China		

=== 2013 ===
#	Category	Winner	Work	Ref.
4th	Best Drama	Heroes in Sui and Tang Dynasties		
4th	Best Director	Gao Xixi	King's War	
4th	Best Writing	Jin Leshi, He Jiangyan	Cao Cao	
4th	Best Actor	David Wang	Little Daddy	
4th	Best Actress	Gong Jie	Cao Cao	
4th	Best Newcomer	Janelle Sing	Baby Blues	
4th	Best Documentary	Some Answers of Macau History		
4th	Best Animation	Bodhi and Friends		
4th	Best Television Host	Zhou Tao		
4th	Outstanding Artistic Contribution Award	Hu Mei	Cao Cao	

=== 2014 ===
#	Category	Winner	Work	Ref.
5th	Best Drama	All Quiet in Peking		
5th	Best Actor	Chen Baoguo	All Quiet in Peking	
5th	Best Documentary	Si Xiang		
5th	Television Industry Development Contribution Award	You Xiaogang		

=== 2015 ===
#	Category	Winner	Work	Ref.
6th	Outstanding Television Drama	Nirvana in Fire, The Last Battle		
6th	Best Director	Liu Meng	SWAT	
6th	Best Writing	Li Zhenghu, Dong Fangyuan, Luo Yue, Zhang Chenggong, You Xiaogang	Anti-terrorism Special Forces	
6th	Best Actor	Li Xuejian	Hey Daddy	
6th	Best Actress	Zanilia Zhao	The Journey of Flower	
6th	Best Supporting Actress	Cui Xinqin	Tiger Mom	
6th	Best Newcomer	Zhou Tingyi	Anti-terrorism Special Forces	
6th	Outstanding Web Drama	The Lost Tomb		
6th	Best Television Producer	Hou Hongliang		

=== 2016 ===
#	Category	Winner	Work	Ref.
7th	Outstanding Television Drama	Ode to Joy, Keep the Marriage as Jade		
7th	Best Actor	Ahn Jae-hyun	Cinderella with Four Knights	
7th	Best Actress	Guan Xiaotong	Novoland: Castle in the Sky	
7th	Best Supporting Actor	David Wang	Keep the Marriage as Jade	
7th	Outstanding Web Drama	Yu Zui		
