= Flying Apsaras Awards =

Biannual Chinese television awards

China Television Drama Flying Apsaras Awards 中国电视剧飞天奖
- Awarded for: Outstanding performance and achievement in television
- Country: China
- Presented by: SARFT, Motion Picture and Arts Committee of the PRC (中国电视艺术委员会)
- First award: 1981

China Television Drama Flying Apsaras Awards
- Simplified Chinese: 中国电视剧飞天奖
Transcriptions
Standard Mandarin
- Hanyu Pinyin: Zhōngguó Diànshìjù Feī Tiān Jiǎng

The China TV Drama Flying Apsaras Awards (Chinese: 中国电视剧飞天奖; pinyin: Zhōngguó Diànshìjù Fēi Tiān Jiǎng), also known as Flying Apsaras Awards, or simply Feitian Awards, is a biennial awards ceremony honoring excellence in Chinese television. Named after the Gandhanra, aka "Flying Apsaras", the design of the trophy is based on ancient carvings of the Flying Apsaras found inside the Mogao Caves in Dunhuang. It is the longest-running television award ceremony in China as well as the highest government honor in the industry.

== History ==
The awards were first held in 1981 and presented by the Ministry of Culture of the People's Republic of China. The event was subsequently taken over by the State Administration of Press, Publication, Radio, Film and Television and the Motion Picture and Arts Committee of China. In 1983, the awards were renamed Feitian, literally "flying Apsaras". The awards ceremony was originally held to honour television series only. However, four acting categories were created in 1984: Outstanding Actor, Outstanding Actress, Outstanding Supporting Actor, and Outstanding Supporting Actress. Director, writer, cinematography, and music categories were added in 1993.

The event has undergone several category reforms. It initially separated the winning productions by length (serial drama, mid-length, miniseries), with each category awarding shows based on first-class (一等奖), second-class (二等奖), and third-class (三等奖) honours. From 2015 onwards, productions have been awarded based on genres, including historical, contemporary, and significant events only.

Formerly an annual event, the Flying Apsaras and Golden Eagle Awards have been held on alternate years since 2005, with Feitian taking place on odd years.

== Award categories ==
=== Current ===
- Outstanding Historical Television Series (优秀历史题材类电视剧)
- Outstanding Contemporary Television Series (优秀现实题材类电视剧)
- Outstanding Television Series Based on Significant Events (优秀重大题材类电视剧)
- Outstanding Director (优秀导演)
- Outstanding Writer (优秀编剧)
- Outstanding Actor (优秀男演员)
- Outstanding Actress (优秀女演员)

=== Past ===
- Outstanding Music (优秀音乐)
- Outstanding Sound Editing (优秀音像)
- Outstanding Editing (优秀剪辑)
- Outstanding Artistry (优秀艺术)
- Outstanding Cinematography (优秀摄像)

== See also ==
- List of Asian television awards
