= Magnolia Award for Best Supporting Actor in a Television Series =

Chinese TV award

Magnolia Award for Best Supporting Actor is awarded under the Shanghai Television Festival.

== Winners and nominees ==
=== 2010s ===
Year	Winner and nominees	English title	Original title
2015	Feng Yuanzheng	The Chinese Old Peasant	老农民
2015	Ni Dahong	All Quiet in Peking	北平无战事
2015	Hu Ge	Forty Nine Days: Memorial	四十九日·祭
2015	William Chan	Swords of Legends	古剑奇谭
2015	Huang Xuan	Red Sorghum	红高粱
2016	Zhao Lixin	In the Silence	于无声处
2016	Wang Kai	Nirvana in Fire	瑯琊榜
2016	Liu Yijun	The Disguiser	伪装者
2016	Zhang Luyi	Love Me If You Dare	他来了，请闭眼
2016	Han Tongsheng	Tiger Mom	虎妈猫爸
2017	Wu Gang	In the Name of People	人民的名义
2017	Zhang Zhijian	In the Name of People	人民的名义
2017	Jin Dong	Ode to Joy	欢乐颂
2017	Zhang Luyi	Sparrow	麻雀
2017	Zhao Lixin	Chinese Style Relationship	中国式关系
2018	Yu Hewei	The Advisors Alliance	大军师司马懿之军师联盟
2018	Yu Haoming	Nothing Gold Can Stay	那年花开月正圆
2018	Zhai Tianlin	White Deer Plain	白鹿原
2018	Ni Dahong	Tracks in the Snowy Forest	雪海
2018	He Bing	White Deer Plain	白鹿原
2019	Guo Jingfei	All Is Well	都挺好
2019	Gao Xin	All Is Well	都挺好
2019	Li Naiwen	Frontier of Love	爱情的边疆
2019	Liu Yijun	Great Expectations	远大前程
2019	Zhu Yilong	The Story of Minglan	知否知否应是红肥绿瘦

=== 2020s ===
Year	Winner and nominees	English title	Original title
2020	Tian Yu	Joy of Life	庆余年
2020	Zhang Luyi	New World	新世界
2020	Chen Daoming	Joy of Life	庆余年
2020	Wang Jinsong	The Thunder	破冰行动
2020	Sha Yi	A Little Reunion	小欢喜
2021	You Yongzhi	Minning Town	山海情
2021	Dong Zijian	Like a Flowing River 2	大江大河2
2021	Li Zefeng	Nothing But Thirty	三十而已
2021	Zhang Jiayi	Minning Town	山海情
2021	Ma Shaohua	Awakening Age	觉醒年代
2023	Ding Yongdai	A Lifelong Journey	人世间
2023	Ning Li	Enemy	对手
2023	Wang Jingchun	Ordinary Greatness	警察荣誉
2023	Wang Xiao	Bright Future	县委大院
2023	Wang Yang	The Rebel	叛逆者
2024	Ning Li	Ripe Town	繁城之下
2024	Chen Minghao	The Long Season	漫长的季节
2024	Dong Yong	Blossoms Shanghai	繁花
2024	Dong Zijian	Like a Flowing River 3	大江大河之岁月如歌
2024	Liao Fan	Fearless Blood	欢颜
2025	Jiang Qiming	Escape from the Trilateral Slopes	边水往事
2025	Guo Xiaodong	Romance in the Alley	小巷人家
2025	Fu Dalong	We are Criminal Police	我是刑警
2025	Lin Gengxin	The Tale of Rose	玫瑰的故事
2025	Nie Yuan	She and Her Girls	山花烂漫时
2026	Dong Yong	Swords Into Plowshares	太平年
2026	Huang Jue	The Legend of Zang Hai	藏海传
2026	Lin Yongjian	This Thriving Land	生万物
2026	Ni Dahong	This Thriving Land	生万物
2026	Zhu Yawen	Swords Into Plowshares	太平年
