= 22nd Shanghai Television Festival =

Chinese TV awards ceremony in 2016

The 22nd Shanghai Television Festival (simplified Chinese: 第22届上海电视节; traditional Chinese: 第22屆上海電視節) took place in Shanghai, China between June 6 and June 10, 2016.

== Winners and nominees ==
Best Television Series	Best Director
The Legend of Mi Yue; Tiger Mom; The Journey of Flower; Drama Theatre; Nirvana in Fire; Glorious Past of Qingdao; The Young General; The Disguiser; Legend of Entrepreneurship 2; In The Silence	Kong Sheng and Li Xue–Nirvana in Fire; Yan Jiangang–In The Silence; Yao Xiaofeng–Tiger Mom; Zhang Li–The Young General; Zheng Xiaolong–The Legend of Mi Yue
Best Actor	Best Actress
Hu Ge–Nirvana in Fire; Wallace Huo–The Journey of Flower; Jin Dong–The Disguiser; Li Xuejian–The Young Marshall; Tong Dawei–Tiger Mom	Sun Li–The Legend of Mi Yue; Song Jia–The Young Marshall; Yan Ni–Wang Dahua's Legendary Career; Zanilia Zhao–The Journey of Flower; Zhao Wei–Tiger Mom
Best Supporting Actor	Best Supporting Actress
Zhao Lixin–In The Silence; Han Tongsheng–Tiger Mom; Liu Yijun–The Disguiser; Wang Kau–Nirvana in Fire; Zhang Luyi–Love Me If You Dare	Liu Tao–The Legend of Mi Yue; Dong Jie–Tiger Mom; Liu Mintao–Nirvana in Fire; Ada Liu–The Young Marshall; Angel Wang–The Disguiser
Best Variety Show	Best Seasonal Variety Show
Chinese Poetry Congress; Waiting For Me; A Special Six-Plus-One; Voice; Up Close And Personal; Start To Happy; Happy Bill; Chinese IDiom Congress; Chinese Character Dictation Contest; Chinese Riddle Congress	Super Brain (Season 3); Amazing Chinese (Season 2); Passeur (Season 1); Great Challenge (Season 1); Super Diva (Season 3); Brian's Song (Season 1); The Legendary Swordsman (Season 2); Takes A Real Man (Season 1); Sing My Song (season 3); The Voice of China (season 4)
Best Writer	
Jiang Qitao–The Young Marshall; Gao Mantang/ Li Tao/ Qu Yilin–Legend of Entrepreneurship 2; Hai Yan–Nirvana in Fire; Shen Jie–Tiger Mom; Zhang Yong–The Disguiser	
