= 30th Flying Apsaras Awards =

The 30th Flying Apsaras Awards (simplified Chinese: 第30届中国电视剧飞天奖; traditional Chinese: 第30屆中國電視劇飛天獎) were held in Hangzhou, Zhejiang, China. Nominees and winners are listed below, winners are in bold.

All Quiet in Peking won four awards, the most for the evening, including Outstanding Director, Outstanding Writer, Outstanding Actor and Outstanding Television Series Based on Significant Events. Other winners Romance of Our Parents won three awards, including Outstanding Director, Outstanding Actress and Outstanding Modern Television Series.

== Winners and nominees ==
Outstanding Director	Outstanding Writer
Kong Sheng–**All Quiet in Peking** (北平无战事), **Romance of Our Parents** (父母爱情) and **Nirvana in Fire** (琅琊榜); Mao Weining–Ordinary World (平凡的世界) and Ten Farewell To Red Army (十送红军); Li Wenqi–Northeast United Resistance Army (东北抗日联军)	Liu Heping–**All Quiet in Peking** (北平无战事); Liu Debin–The Untold Story of Tibet (西藏秘密); Liu Jing–Romance of Our Parents (父母爱情)
Outstanding Actor	Outstanding Actress
Chen Baoguo–**The Chinese Old Peasant** (老农民), **All Quiet in Peking** (北平无战事), **The Mekong River** (湄公河大案), **The River Children** (大河儿女), **Home** (原乡); Wu Xiubo–The Patriot Fei Yue (精忠岳飞) and Ma Xiangyang to the Countryside (马向阳下乡记); Hu Ge–The Disguiser (伪装者) and Nirvana in Fire (琅琊榜)	Mei Ting–**Romance of Our Parents** (父母爱情); Liu Tao–Nirvana in Fire (琅琊榜) and To Elderly With Love (老有所依); Zhou Xun–Red Sorghum (红高粱)
Outstanding Historical Television Series	Outstanding Modern Television Series
**The Qin Empire II: Alliance** (大秦帝国之纵横); **Nirvana in Fire** (琅琊榜)	**Ordinary World** (平凡的世界); **Romance of Our Parents** (父母爱情); **Ma Xiangyang to the Countryside** (马向阳下乡记); **The Mekong River** (湄公河大案); **The Sound of Silence** (于无声处); **Hey Daddy** (嘿，老头！); **In the Road** (大路上); **Ships in the Gulf of Aden** (舰在亚丁湾); **Home** (原乡)
Outstanding Television Series Based on Significant Events	
**Mao Zedong** (毛泽东); **Deng Xiaoping at History's Crossroads** (历史转折中的邓小平); **Northeast United Resistance Army** (东北抗日联军); **All Quiet in Peking** (北平无战事); **Find the Path** (寻路); **On Taihang Mountains** (太行山上)	
