= The First Half of My Life =

Chinese name
- Chinese: 我的前半生
Transcriptions
Standard Mandarin
- Hanyu Pinyin: Wǒ de Qiánbànshēng
- Genre: Romance; Drama
- Based on: The First Half of My Life by Yi Shu
- Written by: Qin Wen
- Directed by: Shen Yan
- Starring: Jin Dong; Ma Yili; Yuan Quan; Lei Jiayin; Wu Yue; Chen Daoming
- Opening theme: Once Only
- Ending theme: In the Pouring Rain by Li Ruoxi
- Country of origin: China
- Original language: Mandarin
- No. of episodes: 42

Production
- Executive producer: Li Xiaobiao
- Production location: Shanghai
- Production company: New Classics Media

Original release
- Network: Beijing Television; Dragon Television
- Release: July 4 – July 26, 2017

The First Half of My Life (Chinese: 我的前半生; pinyin: Wǒ de Qiánbànshēng) is a 2017 Chinese television series based on Hong Kong novelist Yi Shu's novel of the same name and centers on a group of city dwellers who have to make choices about love and career. It was directed by Shen Yan and stars Jin Dong, Ma Yili, Yuan Quan, Lei Jiayin, Wu Yue, and Chen Daoming. The series was first broadcast on Beijing Television and Dragon Television on 4 July 2017.

== Synopsis ==
Luo Zijun lives a peaceful life as a full-time housewife, yet is unaware of the cracks in her marriage. One day, her husband Chen Junsheng files for divorce, and she is shocked. After divorce, Luo Zijun heads back into the workforce with the help of her dear friend Tang Jing and He Han, both being white-collar workers and elites.

== Cast ==
=== Main ===
- Jin Dong as He Han (贺涵), an elite in the consulting industry. His girlfriend is Tang Jing, and they've been together for ten years.
- Ma Yili as Luo Zijun (罗子君), a full-time housewife who lives a simple life after marriage with Chen Junsheng.
- Yuan Quan as Tang Jing (唐晶), a career-minded woman and He Han's girlfriend.
- Lei Jiayin as Chen Junsheng (陈俊生), an elite in the career workforce and Luo Zijun's husband.
- Wu Yue as Ling Ling (凌玲), Chen Junsheng's second wife.
- Chen Daoming as Zhuo Jianqing (卓渐清), He Han's friend.

=== Supporting ===
- Xu Di as Xue Zhenzhu (薛珍珠), Luo Zijun and Luo Ziqun's mother.
- Zhang Lingxin as Luo Ziqun (罗子群), Luo Zijun's younger sister.
- Zheng Luoqian as Wei Wei'an (薇薇安)
- Wang Tianze as Leng Jiaqing (冷佳清), Ling Ling's son and Chen Junsheng's stepson.
- Vivian Wu as Aunt Wu
- Luan Yuanhui as Bai Guang
- Chuo Ni as Luoluo
- Mei Ting as Zhuo Jianqing's former girlfriend
- Tan Kai as Adom
- Kong Wei as a single woman
- Zhang Yanyan as Su Manshu
- Hou Yansong as Laojin
- Wei Zhihao as Ping'er
- Song Yunhao as Duan Xiaotian
- Xu Caigen as Cui Baojian
- Ren Jimin as Chen Junsheng's father
- Zhang Lan as Chen Junsheng's mother
- Ru Tian as Ya Qin
- Min Tianhao as A Hui
- Shi An as Lawyer Li
- Guo Tongtong as Xiaodong
- Chen Guanning as Cui Baojian's son
- Yang Mei as a chubby girl.
- Sun Yuhan as Caicai
- Xu Sheng as Phil
- Guan Xueying as Sandra Dong
- Bi Hanwen as the lawyer of Chen Junsheng
- Qu Lingzi as He Han's assistant
- Lu Ling as Yingying
- Cheng Hong as the marketing manager
- Huang Jing as Tang Jing's assistant
- Yu Mingjia as the CEO of Angel
- Ren Donglin as Li Rui
- Zhang Yi as Luo Ping

== Soundtrack ==
The First Half of My Life - Original Television Soundtrack
No.	Title	Music	Length
1.	"Once Only (曾今唯一)" (Opening theme song)
2.	"In the Pouring Rain (滂沱大雨里)" (Ending theme song)	Li Ruoxi
3.	"With Infinite Care (小心翼翼)"	Ye Linsheng
4.	"The Moment the Crystal Ball Breaks (水晶球破裂那刻)"	Lin Siyun
5.	"When I See You There"	Knox Summerour
6.	"You & I"	Linda Jackson
7.	"A Playground Where Lights Undousing (不熄灯的游乐场)"	Lin Siyun

== Ratings ==
- Highest ratings are marked in red, lowest ratings are marked in blue

Broadcast date	Episode #	Dragon TV CSM52			Beijing TV CSM52		
Broadcast date	Episode #	Ratings (%)	Audience share (%)	Rank	Ratings (%)	Audience share (%)	Rank
2017.7.4	1-2	0.863	3.06	3	0.517	1.82	5
2017.7.5	3-4	1.071	3.71	2	0.576	1.98	4
2017.7.6	5-6	1.185	4.03	2	0.647	2.19	4
2017.7.7	7-8	1.165	4.12	1	0.637	2.25	5
2017.7.8	9	1.095	3.94	1	0.693	2.5	4
2017.7.9	10-11	1.345	4.64	1	0.934	3.23	3
2017.7.10	12-13	1.565	5.44	1	0.751	2.61	5
2017.7.11	14-15	1.456	5.09	1	0.92	3.21	4
2017.7.12	16-17	1.517	5.39	1	0.926	3.29	5
2017.7.13	18-19	1.654	5.77	1	1.119	3.92	3
2017.7.14	20-21	1.86	6.44	1	1.104	3.84	2
2017.7.15	22	1.66	6.21	1	1.036	3.87	2
2017.7.16	23-24	2.126	7.19	1	1.438	4.88	2
2017.7.17	25-26	2.157	7.26	1	1.473	4.95	2
2017.7.18	27-28	2.301	7.72	1	1.574	5.26	2
2017.7.19	29-30	2.552	8.29	1	1.712	5.55	2
2017.7.20	31-32	2.307	7.8	1	1.86	6.28	2
2017.7.21	33-34	2.41	7.23	1	1.751	5.97	2
2017.7.22	35	2.253	8.27	1	1.4	5.14	2
2017.7.23	36-37	2.548	8.35	1	1.894	6.2	2
2017.7.24	38-39	2.649	8.819	1	1.988	6.619	2
2017.7.25	40-41	2.836	9.601	1	2.002	6.784	2
2017.7.26	42	3.012	10.48	1	1.99	6.9	2

== Reception ==
Since its broadcast, the series has caused heated discussions online and obtained high ratings. Shen Yan, director of the series, attribute the show's success to its capability to capture modern life in China through several ordinary people's lives and the great influence of book writer Isabel Nee Yeh-su. By emphasizing the importance of female independence, the series has won much favor among female audiences. However, the series has been criticized by book fans for veering too much from the plot. Its display of improper ethical values has also been criticized for degrading social conduct.

== Awards and nominations ==
Year	Award	Category	Nominee	Result	Ref.
2017	4th Hengdian Film and TV Festival of China	Best Actress	Ma Yili	Won	
2017	8th Macau International Television Festival	Best Television Series	The First Half of My Life	Nominated	
2017	8th Macau International Television Festival	Best Director	Shen Yan	Nominated	
2017	8th Macau International Television Festival	Best Writing	Qin Wen	Nominated	
2017	8th Macau International Television Festival	Best Actor	Jin Dong	Nominated	
2017	8th Macau International Television Festival	Best Supporting Actress	Yuan Quan	Nominated	
2017	31st Feitian Awards	Best Television Series	The First Half of My Life	Nominated	
2018	24th Shanghai Television Festival	Best Television Series	The First Half of My Life	Nominated	
2018	24th Shanghai Television Festival	Best Director	Shen Yan	Nominated	
2018	24th Shanghai Television Festival	Best Writer	Qin Wen	Won	
2018	24th Shanghai Television Festival	Best Actor	Lei Jiayin	Nominated	
2018	24th Shanghai Television Festival	Best Actress	Ma Yili	Won	
2018	24th Shanghai Television Festival	Best Actress	Yuan Quan	Nominated	
2018	24th Shanghai Television Festival	Best Supporting Actress	Wu Yue	Nominated	
2018	24th Shanghai Television Festival	Best Supporting Actress	Xu Di	Won	
2018	29th China TV Golden Eagle Award	Best Television Series	The First Half of My Life	Nominated	
2018	29th China TV Golden Eagle Award	Best Screenplay	Qin Wen	Nominated	
2018	29th China TV Golden Eagle Award	Best Actress	Yuan Quan	Nominated	

== International broadcast ==
The series will be broadcast by Star Chinese Channel outside of China and Mediacorp Channel 8 in Singapore every Saturday, 10:30pm to 12:30am the next day, broadcasting two episodes in a day.

It first aired in Thailand on Channel 3 in 2021 daily at 2:50 am starting Friday 27 August, following Eternal Love (rerun) finished.
