= Lan Yingying =

Chinese actress

- Born: Lishui, China
- Education: Central Academy of Drama
- Occupations: Actress, television host
- Years active: 2011–present
- Agent: Huace Media

Chinese name
- Chinese: 蓝盈莹
Transcriptions
Standard Mandarin
- Hanyu Pinyin: Lán Yíngyíng

Lan Yingying, also known as Lyric Lan, is a Chinese actress. She is known for her role as Huanbi in Empresses in the Palace (2011).

== Career ==
Lan made her movie debut playing the role of Haitang in Mural in 2011. She also filmed Empresses in the Palace in 2011, with other notable works like Who Sleeps My Bro in 2016 and Surgeons in 2017.

She made her English film debut with the work Pacific Rim Uprising in 2018.

== Filmography ==
=== Film ===
Year	English title	Chinese title	Role	Notes
2011	Mural	画壁	Haitang	
2013	Oriental Chinese Dream	東方中國夢	Secretary	Cameo
2013	To Father	杏	Li Jiaoli	
2015	Sword of Hope	轩辕剑传奇	Qiuguo	
2016	Who Sleeps My Bro	睡在我上铺的兄	Gao Baojing	
2018	Pacific Rim Uprising	环太平洋2		
2018	Nice to Meet You	遇见你真好	Chen Shan'ni	
2020	The Rescue	紧急救援		
2026	Crossing	四渡	Wan Shufen	

=== Television series ===
Year	English title	Chinese title	Role	Notes
2011	Empresses in the Palace	后宫·甄嬛传	Huanbi, Niohuru Yuyin	
2012		三十里铺	An Qina	
2012	Hunting	猎杀	Anna	
2013	Flashing Swords	雳剑	Lin Qianyue	
2015	Tiger Mom	虎妈猫爸	Huang Li	
2015	Three Soldiers	大熔炉	Yang Ying	
2015	The Stalker	潜行者	Hong Guo	
2016	Who Sleeps My Bro	睡在上铺的兄弟	Gao Baojing	
2016	The Lover's Lies	爱人的谎言	Tong Xiaoxia	
2016	The Classic of Mountains and Seas	山海经之赤影传说	Fu'er	
2016	May December Love 2	小丈夫	Gu Fei	Cameo
2016		荡寇	Tan Qing'er	
2017	The Peach Blossom	一棵桃花开	Sheng Kai	
2017	Surgeons	外科风云	Yang Yu	
2018	Never Gone	原来你还在这里	Zhang Yue	
2019	See You Again	时间都知道	Zhao Wenwen	
2019	Beijing Subway	北京地铁	Li Sichen	
2019	The Best Partner	精英律师	Dai Xi	
2020	Wrinkle, Women, Wonderful?			GQ web series
TBA	Against the Light	逆光	Bai Xining	
TBA	Growing Pains of Swordmen	欢乐英雄	Yan Qi	
TBA	The Justice	宣判		

=== Variety show ===
Year	English title	Chinese title	Role	Notes
2020	Sisters Who Make Waves	乘风破浪的姐姐	Cast member	

== Discography ==
Year	English title	Chinese title	Album	Notes/Ref.
2019	"Starry Sea"	星辰大海		For China Movie Channel Young Actors Project with 31 other actors

== Awards and nominations ==
Year	Awards	Category	Nominated work	Results	Ref.
2017	8th Macau International Television Festival	Best Supporting Actress	Surgeons	Won	
2017	Men's UNO YOUNG Awards	Most Promising Actress	—N/a	Won	
2019	6th The Actors of China Award Ceremony	Best Actress (Emerald Category)	Never Gone	Nominated	
2019	11th China TV Drama Awards	Most Promising Actress	—N/a	Won	
2020	7th The Actors of China Award Ceremony	Best Actress (Emerald)	—N/a	Pending	

== Personal life ==
Yingying dated actor Cao Jun from 2016-2019.

She has stated she is of the She ethnic minority.
