= List of Nirvana in Fire characters =

Nirvana in Fire cast of male characters, from left to right: Li Gang, Xie Bi, Yan Yujin, Fei Liu, Prince Ji, Marquis Yan Que, Crown Prince of Xian, Prince Jing, Mei Changsu/Su Zhe/Lin Shu, Prince Yu, Emperor of Liang, Xia Jiang, Xie Yu, Meng Zhi, Xiao Jingrui, Mu Qing and Lin Chen.

This is a list of Nirvana in Fire characters. The Chinese drama, Nirvana in Fire was adapted from Lang Ya Bang, a web novel written by Haiyan. The series takes place during the Wei and Liang dynasties in Ancient China. It follows Mei Changsu, a strategist who enters the capital of the Liang Dynasty to overturn a miscarriage of justice laid upon his family as well as help his close friend become the new Emperor.

== Main characters ==
=== Mei Changsu/Su Zhe/Lin Shu ===
Lin Shu (林殊) (played by Hu Ge; teenage counterpart played by Zhang Zhehan) is the main protagonist and the son of Lin Xie, the commander general under the Emperor of Da Liang, and Grand Princess Jinyang. He was described as high-spirited and extremely bright prodigy, as well as proud and skillful by his cousin and close friend, Xiao Jingyan. However, when he and his father went off to battle the Northern Wei, they and the Chiyan Army were framed as traitors to the emperor, and was therefore attacked under the Emperor's orders. Only Lin Shu and a few other comrades survived the slaughter. However, as the result of the fighting, Lin Shu was poisoned by the "Poison of the Bitter Flame", and therefore underwent treatment that changed his appearance. He became weak and sensitive to the cold, and could never perform martial arts again. For the next twelve years, he created the Jiang Zuo Alliance with the help of Langya Hall, and became the chief of the pugilist world. Lin Shu, as Mei Changsu, returns to Jin Ling to stir the court's politics.

Mei Changsu (梅长苏), also known as Su Zhe (苏哲), has a calm and regal demeanor. However, he is determined to bring justice to his family as well as the Chiyan Army and is willing to do all the dirty work for Prince Jing so that he will attain his goal.

=== Xiao Jingyan, Prince Jing ===
Prince Jing (靖王) (played by Wang Kai), born Xiao Jingyan (萧景琰), is the seventh son of the Emperor by Consort Jing. He and his cousin, Lin Shu, were very close friends, and when his comrade was labeled as a traitor, he was one of the only few people who voiced his objections, causing him to lose favor from the Emperor. Prince Jing was also very close to his older brother, Prince Qi, who also died as a result of the Chiyan conspiracy. Because of the conspiracy, he abhors strategists and their evil deeds to get what they want. However, he agrees to cooperate with Mei Changsu, not knowing that his true identity was his best friend.

Because of the lack of power and favor, Prince Jing has been treated like a joke by the court. Different from the other two princes, however, he is deeply rooted to his morals and believes that the innocent should not be used as chess pieces or harmed for people to get what they want. He is also described as humble, filial, but has a stubborn personality. After finding out that the Chiyan army were indeed innocent of the charge against them, he shares the same goal as Mei Changsu, and strives for the throne so that he may clear the Chiyan army and Lin family's name.

=== Princess Mu Nihuang ===
Princess Mu Nihuang (穆霓凰) (played by Liu Tao; teenage counterpart played by Pan Xiaoyang) was betrothed to Lin Shu when they were teenagers, and the two had genuine feelings for each other. However, after the Chiyan incident, she and many others believed that Lin Shu was killed, although she herself believed that he wasn't a traitor. Nihuang is a general for the Mu army and guards the Southern border for the Emperor. Her exceptional fighting skills made her name present in the Langya list. After Mei Changsu returned to the capital, she was able to deduce that he was Lin Shu, with evidence from a few years back, when Mei anonymously sent her a battle plan when her army was unable to defeat the enemy.

== Extended cast ==
=== Jiang Zuo Alliance ===
==== Fei Liu ====
Fei Liu (飞流) (played by Wu Lei) is Mei Changsu's personal bodyguard. Although his background has not been fully revealed, he was helped by Mei Changsu when he was in need, and therefore stayed loyal by his side. He appears to be in his teens with a mind of a child, but his martial art skills are strong enough to take on many able guards. He has beaten Xia Dong, but the only man he cannot beat is Commander general Meng Zhi. He is frequently teased by Lin Chen, and loves to eat sweets. He does not speak often, and replies sparsely when asked a question.

==== Gong Yu and Sir Shisan ====
Gong Yu (宮羽) (played by Zhou Qiqi) and Sir Shisan (十三先生) (played by Gong Fangmin) reside in the Miao Yin Court. Although they planted themselves into Qin Banruo's information network of people, they remain loyal spies to Mei Changsu.

Gong Yu's father was a member of a group of assassins. When he was killed by Xie Yu's men for not completing a mission, Gong Yu sought revenge on Xie Yu, helping Mei Changsu take down the Crown Prince's most powerful ally. Gong Yu is fairly well known in the capital as a talented musician. She cares much about the Chief, and would always try to find ways to help him, such as dressing up as a man to protect him as a soldier. Sir Shisan acts as the leader of all the spies under Mei, carrying out many of his missions.

==== Wei Zheng, Li Gang and Zhen Ping ====
Li Gang (黎纲) (played by Wang Hong) and Zhen Ping (played by Zhao Yilong) were ex-Chiyan captains that escaped the slaughter with Mei Changsu twelve years before. Li Gang serves as the housekeeper of the Su Residence, while Zhen Ping is a skilled swordsman who defeated nine martial arts experts sent by Zhuo Dingfeng in one day. Both men remain loyal to their Marshal Lin Shu.

Wei Zheng (卫峥) (played by Li Shuai) is a former Lieutenant of Chiyan Army under Lin Shu. He escaped the Chiyan massacre when his marshal ordered him to leave to find Nie Feng's army. After the tragedy, Wei assumed an alias and became the adopted son of the Yaoweng Valley chief. Xia Jiang and Prince Yu used his capture to cause Prince Jing to lose favor, as the prince would bound to argue with his father about the Chiyan case. However, when Wei Zheng was later saved by Jiang Zuo Alliance, he was safely placed at the Mu Manor, and later Su Residence. There, he continued to serve under Mei.

==== Tong Lu ====
Tong Lu (童路) (played by Wei Wei) is an informer and spy, who is disguised as a vegetable deliverer. Mei Changsu had helped him avenge his late sister's death (by taking down Luo Zhi Jing), and therefore became a loyal follower. However, he was seduced by Jun Niang and leaked information about Jiang Zuo Alliance's info-network and plans to Qin Banruo. In the end, he sacrificed himself so that Zhen Ping may escape the capital to inform Mei Changsu about Prince Yu's rebellion.

=== Royal Family ===
==== Xiao Jinghuan, Prince Yu ====
Prince Yu (誉王), born Xiao Jinghuan (萧景桓) (played by Victor Huang), is described as a virtuous prince who shares the most similarity to the Emperor. However, he is ruthless to achieve his goal, and with the help of Qin Banruo, he competes with his brother, Crown Prince Xian, to be the next in line to the throne. His mother was Hua Princess Linglong, who also helped his father rise to power. When she died at the hands of the Emperor, he was adopted by Empress Yan, who did not know of his origins. Prince Yu had been sparring with the Crown Prince for a decade, and invited Mei Changsu to help him after receiving an answer from Langya Hall that Mei has the ability to make him the Crown Prince. However, after his own plans backfire, he decides to hold a failed rebellion against his father, which ultimately led to his suicide.

==== Consort Jing ====
Consort Jing (静妃) (played by Liu Mintao) is the mother of Prince Jing. She has a loving, benevolent and calm personality, and is able to remain inconspicuous in the court. She was a traveling doctor who was later saved by Lin Shu's father. She was first invited into the palace by the Lin family as a physician to treat Consort Chen, who later treated Jing like her own sister. For many years, she lived as a concubine with little power to help her son. However, her personality and wisdom caught the attention of the Emperor once more, who later promoted her to Noble Consort. As a skilled doctor, she is able to treat many diseases. She was also able to deduce that Mei Changsu was Lin Shu, but chose to keep his identity a secret from her son.

==== Xiao Xuan, Emperor of Liang ====
The Emperor of Liang (梁帝), born Xiao Xuan (萧选) (played by Ding Yongdai) held a rebellion to take the throne by force, with the help of Lin Xie, Marquis Yan and Hua Princess Linglong. He is very selfish and refuses to accept and learn from his mistakes. After he ascended the throne, he executed the Hua Tribe including Princess Linglong. When he heard that Lin Xie and the Chiyan army were planning a rebellion, he immediately executed his old friend, his son and his subordinates. He also executed his own son, Prince Qi, because of the conspiracy. The Emperor is very suspicious in nature, and distrustful of everyone.

==== Xiao Jingxuan, Crown Prince Xian ====
Crown prince Xiao Jingxuan (萧景宣) (played by Gao Xin) is the son of Noble Consort Yue. He and Prince Yu have been fighting for power in the court via faction-forming. It was rumored that a prince from Northern Yan was a nobody with no skills, but became the Crown Prince through help from a divine talent. This spurred him and Prince Yu to seek out the divine talent at Lang Zhou. However, after mistaking that Mei Changsu is supporting Prince Yu, he attempted to assassinate him multiple times. In the end, he was demoted from his status after committing countless felonies, breaking the Emperor's last straw.

==== Grand Princess Li Yang ====
Grand Princess Li Yang (莅阳长公主) (played by Zhang Yanyan) is the sister of the Emperor and Grand Princess Jin Yang. Two decades ago, Li Yang fell in love with a Southern Chu hostage prince sent to Da Liang during a warring period. She begged her mother to let her go with him to Southern Chu, but her mother refused, forcing her to marry Xie Yu, by intoxicating her with a substance known as Qing Si Rao. Before she married, she became pregnant with the Southern Chu prince's baby. Out of anger, Xie Yu tried to assassinate the child, but instead, Li Yang used Madame Zhuo's child as a decoy to save her own son's life. Li Yang has a gentle demeanor, but inside, she is tormented by her sin as well as her forced marriage. After Xie Yu's exile and death, she kept his written confession to help Mei Changsu and Prince Jing reopen the Chiyan case.

==== Empress Yan ====
Empress Yan (皇后言氏) (played by Fang Xiaoli) is the adopted mother of Prince Yu. She married into the royal family when she was 16 years old. When an epidemic took her own son's life, she adopted Prince Yu when his own mother died. She frequently bullies Consort Hui and conspired against Noble Consort Yue and the Crown Prince. After her son failed to rebel and committed suicide, she was demoted and was confined to a Buddhist monastery for life.

==== Noble Consort Yue ====
Noble Consort Yue (越贵妃) (played by Yang Yuting) is the mother of Prince Xian. She was a favored Consort that quickly rose up the ranks with power to rival the Empress. She was able to make her son the Crown Prince make use of his faction. However, she was demoted after the Emperor found out that she tried to use Qin Si Rao to force Princess Nihuang to marry Sima Lei, a Crown Prince supporter. His favor for her slowly diminished, with her permanently incarcerated in her palace.

==== Xiao Jingyu, Prince Qi ====
Prince Qi (祁王), born Xiao Jingyu (萧景禹) (played by Ji Chen) was the Emperor's eldest son. The son of Consort Chen, he was righteous, dutiful, and not afraid to speak out his mind. However, he frequently clashed with the Emperor whenever they spoke about their opinions about politics. Using the rift between the father and son, Xia Jiang framed the prince for conspiring with the Chiyan Army to hold a rebellion. This led to Prince Qi's wrongful imprisonment and execution.

==== Prince Ji ====
Prince Ji (纪王) (played by Tong Ningwen) is the younger brother of the Emperor. Kind-hearted and carefree, he enjoys leisure and entertainment, with no ambition for the throne. He is very straightforward and would speak from his heart no matter what people say. He saved Tingsheng, Prince Qi's posthumous son, from being killed during the Chiyan conspiracy. Prince Ji is a good friend of Yan Yujin, and unwittingly helps Mei take down Xia Jiang.

==== Xiao Tingsheng ====
Xiao Tingsheng (萧庭生) (played by Zhang Juming, teenage counterpart played by Lan Tian) is Prince Qi's hidden son. He was saved by Prince Ji from being killed along with the rest of his family, and has been enslaved in the palace. Prince Jing secretly looks out for him in the palace. During the selection of Princess Nihuang's husband, Mei Changsu, with the help of Meng Zhi, managed to successfully earn the Emperor's permission for him to have his slave status lifted. He was later adopted by Prince Jing. Ting Sheng is good friends with Fei Liu.

=== Nobles ===
==== Marquis Xie Yu ====
Xie Yu (谢玉) (played by Liu Yijun) was a Minister who rose up the ranks after marrying Grand Princess Liyang. He and Xia Jiang planned the Chiyan conspiracy; he was also the one who exterminated Nie Feng's army and later the Chiyan army. Xie Yu's goal was to become the new commander general, and therefore supported the Crown Prince Xian. He took the opportunity of Xiao Jingrui's obscure birth to create a friendship between the Xie and Zhuo families. However, when it was discovered that he killed the Zhuo family's child, he attempted to kill the Zhuo's, as well as the other guests at Jingrui's birthday party. He failed, and was later sent to exile and died after writing his confession.

==== Marquis Yan Que ====
Marquis Yan Que (言阙) (played by Wang Jinsong) is the father of Yan Yujin. He and Lin Xie helped the Emperor take power over Da Liang, but after the Chiyan conspiracy, he began to loathe the Emperor for killing Lin Xie as well as taking away and catalyzing the death of the love of his life, Consort Chen. For twelve years, he focused on Taoism and ignored his son. However, when he tried to assassinate the king with smuggled gunpowder, Mei Changsu was able to persuade him not to, and to care more about Yujin. After the incident, he agreed to help Prince Jing become the Emperor, as he didn't want the throne to go to Crown Prince Xian or Prince Yu, stating that they were too similar to their cold-blooded father.

==== Xiao Jingrui ====
Xiao Jingrui (萧景睿) (played by Cheng Haofeng) is the son of Grand Princess Liyang and the Southern Chu prince. An honest and respectful man, it was he who invited Mei Changsu to stay at the capital, Jinling to recover from his chronic illness. Jingrui is formally the son of both the Xie and the Zhuo family; his surname, Xiao, was given by the Emperor, while he was named after Jingrui mountain, which was where he was born. He was raised shielded from Xie Yu's evil ambitions, but as he found out about his father's true intentions, he began to worry about the future of his family. After finding out that he was the son of the hostage prince, he went with his half sister to Southern Chu to see his father. His best friend is Yan Yujin and is very skilled with the sword.

==== Yan Yujin ====
Yan Yujin (言豫津) (played by Guo Xiaoran) is the son of Marquis Yan. He is very carefree and does not show signs of sadness, despite being ignored by his father all his life. He is good friends with Prince Ji and many others, as a result of his social personality. Although he doesn't care much about politics, he and his father were willing to help Mei Changsu with his plan to make Prince Jing emperor as well as reopen the Chiyan case. He is Xiao Jingrui's best friend, and was also trained by Xia Dong in martial arts.

==== Prince Mu Qing ====
Mu Qing (穆青) (played by Zhang Xiaoqian) is the little brother of Princess Nihuang. Although he is honest with adequate martial art skills, and is the heir to Mu Manor, he has an immature personality and doesn't care to be polite. He helped Mei Changsu find his old teacher's friend as well as hide Wei Zheng after his rescue. Because of his family's fighting power in the South, the Emperor uses him as a hostage; as long as Mu Qing stays the capital, he is sure his sister will not commit mutiny against him.

=== Court personnel ===
==== Meng Zhi ====
Meng Zhi (蒙挚) (played by Chen Long) is the Commander general of Da Liang, as well as the commander of the Imperial Guards. He first learned of Lin Shu's status when they exchanged letters five years before. Meng Zhi is highly skilled in martial arts (best in Jinling and ranks second on the Langya List); even Mei Changsu's bodyguard, Fei Liu, cannot beat him. Although he is skilled in the military, he thinks simply, and has trouble creating effective strategies, solving cases or understanding Mei's way of thinking. He is willing to help Lin Shu and Prince Jing, as he also believes that the Chiyan case should be reopened.

==== Xia Dong ====
Xia Dong (夏冬) (played by Zhang Lingxin) is an executive officer at the Xuan Jing Bureau, who is known for her tomboy-like personality and her vigorous training under Xia Jiang. After learning about the truth behind Chiyan case, she decided to help Mei Changsu and betray her teacher. Her husband, Nie Feng, was believed to be killed during the Chiyan conspiracy, but the two were later reunited when it was discovered that Nie Feng survived the slaughter. She is a good friend of Princess Nihuang, whom she met in the army.

==== Xia Jiang ====
Xia Jiang (夏江) (played by Wang Yongquan) is the leader of the Xuan Jing Bureau, and the main instigator of the Chiyan conspiracy. He framed Crown Prince Qi and the Chiyan army because he was afraid that when Prince Qi ascended to the throne, the new Emperor would disband the Xuan Jing Bureau. As Prince Jing started to rise in power, he knew that the prince would follow his older brother's way and dissolve the Bureau. Because of this, he allied with Prince Yu and Qin Banruo to get rid of Prince Jing. Xia Jiang was later able to deduce that Mei Changsu was Lin Shu, and tried to use this information to bring down his enemies, but ultimately lost the Emperor's trust and was sentenced to death. Xia Jiang is smart and cunning, with strategy skills that rival Mei Changsu. The people he cared about most dearly was his wife and son, who left him when he decided to use his intelligence for evil reasons.

==== Shen Zhui and Cai Quan ====
Shen Zhui (沈追) (played by Feng Hui) and Cai Quan (蔡荃) (played by Lee Duo) were low rank officials in the court who are later chosen by the Emperor to be ministers because of their neutrality between the Crown Prince and Prince Yu. Both officials are proud individuals with few friends, but both have a strong sense of justice as well as friendship with Prince Jing. The two went on to be important pillars of Prince Jing's kingdom.

=== Other characters ===
==== Lin Chen ====
Lin Chen (蔺晨) (played by Jin Dong) is the master of Langya Hall, an omniscient business that answers all questions and doubt as well as list the most talented in the world, a list similar to Forbes. His father became good friends with Mei Changsu's father, Lin Xie after a fight on Langya Mountain. He resides in the pugilist world and is a talented physician. He is skilled enough to give treatment for "Poison of the Bitter Flame". He has a very carefree personality, and cares about beautiful women and teases Fei Liu. However, he is a very loyal friend of Mei Changsu and would help him in any way, from investigating to treating sicknesses.

==== Qin Banruo ====
Qin Banruo (秦般弱) (played by Wang Ou) is Hua strategist who works for Prince Yu. Her master was the late Hua Princess Xuanji, who taught her her skills of manipulation. Her ultimate goal is to help Prince Yu onto the throne, and wreak havoc in the country that subjugated her kingdom, knowing full well that it would be impossible to bring the Hua kingdom back. She is skilled in finding hidden objects or places, and runs an information network as well as an entertainment court, Hong Xiu Zhao, in the capital. After Prince Yu committed suicide, she tried to escape the capital but was later captured and interrogated by Lin Chen.

==== Jun Niang ====
Jun Niang (隽娘) (played by Jin Feng) is a Hua spy. Although initially unwilling to help Qin Banruo, she was later persuaded to fight for the Hua kingdom once more. She was sent to seduce Tong Lu, but because she had fallen in love with him in the process, Banruo was able to continue to use Jun Niang for her future plans. In the end, she sacrificed herself to let Tong Lu escape back to the Su Residence to tell the Mei Changsu that Prince Yu was planning a rebellion.

==== Zhuo Dingfeng ====
Zhuo Dingfeng (卓鼎风) (played by Yan Jie) is the master of the Tian Quan Manor. He, his wife, and his son, Zhuo Qingyao, worked for Xie Yu before the two families fell out during Jingrui's birthday. Zhuo Dingfeng is ranked fourth on the Langya List, with a very good reputation in the pugilist world.
