= Surgeons (TV series) =

- Promotional poster
- Genre: Medical; Drama; Romance
- Written by: Zhu Zhu
- Directed by: Li Xue
- Starring: Jin Dong; Bai Baihe; Li Jiahang; Liu Yijun
- Country of origin: China
- Original language: Mandarin
- No. of episodes: 44

Production
- Producer: Hou Hongliang
- Running time: 45 mins
- Production company: Daylight Entertainment Television Ltd

Original release
- Network: Beijing TV, Zhejiang TV
- Release: April 17 – May 10, 2017

Surgeons (Chinese: 外科风云) is a 2017 Chinese television series produced by Hou Hongliang, directed by Li Xue and written by Zhu Zhu; starring Jin Dong and Bai Baihe. The series aired from 17 April to 10 May 2017 on Beijing TV and Zhejiang TV.

== Synopsis ==
The story originates from a medical malpractice many years ago that resulted in the death of a car accident victim; who has been successfully resuscitated but later died of drug allergy. Zhang Shumei, the nurse who was on duty that night, was forced to resign after being suspected of accidentally killing the patient. Her seven-year-old son, Zhuang Shu did not believe the accusation, and got into a fight at the hospital, causing him to be held up at the police station. Unable to pick up his four-year-old sister, Zhuang Shu later finds out that she was abducted while he was away. Traumatized by the false accusation and the abduction of her daughter, Zhang Shumei eventually committed suicide.

28 years later, Zhuang Shu returns to the hospital as a surgeon; intent on unraveling the secret behind his family's misfortune while searching for his long-lost sister. He meets Lu Chenxi, a thoracic surgeon who is the daughter of the patient that died under Zhang Shumei’s care 30 years ago. Together, they investigate the mystery and fall in love in the process.

== Cast ==
=== Main ===
- Jin Dong as Zhuang Shu
- Bai Baihe as Lu Chenxi
- Li Jiahang as Chen Shaocong
- Liu Yijun as Yang Fan

=== Supporting ===
- Lan Yingying as Yang Yu
- He Dujuan as Chu Jun
- Ma Shaoye as Fu Bowen
- Yang Xinming as Zong Xibei
- Wang Sen as Yang Zixuan
- Jin Zehao as Fang Zhiwei
- Chin Shih-chieh as Xiu Minqi
- Gao Lu as Lin Huan
- Wu Xiaoyu
- Chen Muyang
- Wang Yongquan as Lu Chenxi's father
- Juan Zi as Zhao Jing
- Ding Yongdai
- Wu Nan
- Zhong Ziyi as Nurse
- Chang Fangyuan
- Zhang Moxi
- Gao Xin

=== Special appearances ===
- Hummer Zhang
- Geng Le as Xue Luan, Lu Chenxi's ex-boyfriend
- Hu Ge

== Soundtrack ==
No.	Title	Singer	Length
1.	"Touched the Heaven and Earth (感动天地)" (Opening theme song)	Jeff Chang
2.	"Life's Love (生命的爱)" (Ending theme song)	Han Lei
3.	"Picking Up Light (拾光)"	Yang Zi

== Reception ==
=== Ratings ===
Original broadcast date	Beijing TV ratings		Zhejiang TV ratings			
Original broadcast date	Ratings (%)	Audience share (%)	Rank	Ratings (%)	Audience share (%)	Rank
2017-4-17	0.689	2.184	4	0.532	1.691	8
2017-4-18	0.673	2.19	4	0.554	1.81	7
2017-4-19	0.682	2.145	5	0.472	1.492	8
2017-4-20	0.702	2.118	5	0.555	1.686	8
2017-4-21	0.719	2.22	4	0.706	2.16	5
2017-4-22	0.694	2.27	3	0.504	1.66	4
2017-4-23	0.919	2.86	2	0.386	2.649	9
2017-4-24	0.659	2.08	4	0.641	2.033	5
2017-4-25	0.705	2.132	4	0.638	1.941	5
2017-4-26	0.654	2.018	4	0.644	1.995	5
2017-4-27	0.543	1.718	5	0.657	2.08	4
2017-4-28	0.718	2.31	5	0.846	2.77	3
2017-4-29	0.665	2.41	3	0.71	2.58	2
2017-4-30	0.82	2.86	1	0.792	2.75	3
2017-5-1	0.922	3.086	2	0.784	2.632	4
2017-5-2	0.926	3.095	1	0.745	2.498	5
2017-5-3	0.956	3.123	2	0.855	2.799	5
2017-5-4	0.845	2.826	2	0.778	2.549	6
2017-5-5	0.885	2.84	2	1.042	3.36	1
2017-5-6	0.924	3.12	1	0.799	2.69	2
2017-5-7	0.936	3.02	3	0.98	3.16	1
2017-5-8	0.952	3.17	3	0.996	3.327	2
2017-5-9	1.032	3.538	2	1.024	3.513	3
2017-5-10	0.861	3.109	3	1.002	3.692	1

- Highest ratings are marked in red, lowest ratings are marked in blue

=== Awards and nominations ===
Year	Award	Category	Nominated work	Result	Ref.
2017	8th Macau International Television Festival	Best Supporting Actress	Lan Yingying	Nominated	
