= 19th Huading Awards =

2016 entertainment awards

- Date: May 21, 2016

The 19th Huading Awards ceremony was held on May 21, 2016 at Chengdu. The awards are a set of entertainment accolades presented in China.

== Nominations and winners ==
Complete list of nominees and winners (denoted in bold)

Best Director	Best Screenwriter
**Yao Xiaofeng** - **Tiger Mom**; Kong Sheng, Li Xue - Nirvana in Fire; Zheng Xiaolong - The Legend of Mi Yue; Li Xue - The Disguiser; Yang Yazhou - Hey Daddy	**Wang Liping** - **Good Times**; Wang Xiaoping, Jiang Shengnan - The Legend of Mi Yue; Hai Yan - Nirvana in Fire; Zhang Yong - The Disguiser; Geling Yan - Graduation Song
Best Actor	Best Actress
**Huang Bo** - **Qingdao Past Events**; Hu Ge - Nirvana in Fire; Wallace Huo - The Journey of Flower; Wang Kai - The Disguiser; Wu Xiubo - The Literati in Troubled Times	**Ma Yili** - **Swan Dive for Love**; Song Jia - Young Marshal; Sun Li - The Legend of Mi Yue; Bai Baihe - Grow Up; Hai Qing - Running After the Love
Best Actor (Ancient Drama)	Best Actress (Ancient Drama)
**Gao Yunxiang** - **The Legend of Mi Yue**; Nicky Wu - Legend of Zu Mountain; Lu Yi - The Legend of Qin; Alex Fong - The Legend of Mi Yue; Hans Zhang - The Four	**Jiang Xin** - **Hua Xu Yin: City of Desperate Love**; Angelababy - Love Yunge from the Desert; Liu Tao - Nirvana in Fire; Michelle Chen - The Legend of Qin; Zanilia Zhao - The Journey of Flower
Best Actor (Revolutionary-Era Drama)	Best Actress (Revolutionary-Era Drama)
**Jin Dong** - **The Disguiser**; Wang Lei - Warriors on Fire; Yang Zhigang - Yangko Dance; Jiang Wu - The Literati in Troubled Times; Jia Nailiang - Destined to Love You	~~**Zheng Shuang** - **The Cage of Love**~~; Liu Tao - Warriors on Fire; Li Xiaoran - Graduation Song; Joe Chen - Destined to Love You; Liu Mintao - The Disguiser
Best Actor (Contemporary Drama)	Best Actress (Contemporary Drama)
**Zhu Yawen** - **Swan Dive for Love**; Lei Jiayin - Mission Impossible Love; Hu Ge - Good Times; Wallace Huo - Love Me If You Dare; Ren Zhong - Junior Parents	**Tong Liya** - **The Ordinary World**; Song Jia - Hey Daddy; Wang Luodan - Turned to say Love You; Victoria Song - Beautiful Secret; Zanilia Zhao - Best Get Going
Best Supporting Actor	Best Supporting Actress
**Fan Ming** - **Mission Impossible Love**; Zu Feng - Graduation Song; Wang Kuirong - Yangko Dance; Yuan Hong - The Ordinary World; Chen Xiao - Love Yunge from the Desert	**Wang Ou** - **The Disguiser**; Ma Su - The Legend of Mi Yue; Jiang Shuying - Grow Up; Dilraba Dilmurat - Diamond Lover; Anita Yuen - Family on the Go 2
Best Newcomer	Best Producer
**Yin Zheng** - **Love Me If You Dare**; Leo Wu - Nirvana in Fire; Zhang Tianai - Go Princess Go; Guan Xiaotong - My Wife is Born After the 80s; Zhang Xinyi - Young Marshal	**Cao Ping** - **The Legend of Mi Yue**; Hou Hongliang - Nirvana in Fire, The Disguiser, Qingdao Past Events; Tang Lijun - The Journey of Flower; Li Na - The Ordinary World; Hua-Tao Teng - Grow Up
Top 10 Dramas	Audience's Favorite Stars
**Nirvana in Fire**; The Legend of Mi Yue; The Disguiser; Qingdao Past Events; The Ordinary World; Good Times; The Literati in Troubled Times; Hey Daddy; Tiger Mom; Junior Parents	Wang Ziwen; Victor Huang; Eddie Cheung; Zhang Yao; Wang Yaoqing; Wang Xiaochen; Huang Bo; Ma Yili; Huang Man; Gu Zhixin
Best Production Company
东阳市花儿影视文化有限公司; 北京春天融和有限公司; 上海贯一文化; 新丽电视文化投资有限公司; SMG尚世影业; 浙江华谊兄弟影业投资有限公司; 北京华录百纳影视股份有限公司; 海润影视制作有限公司
