= Liu Yijun (actor) =

Chinese actor

- 刘奕君
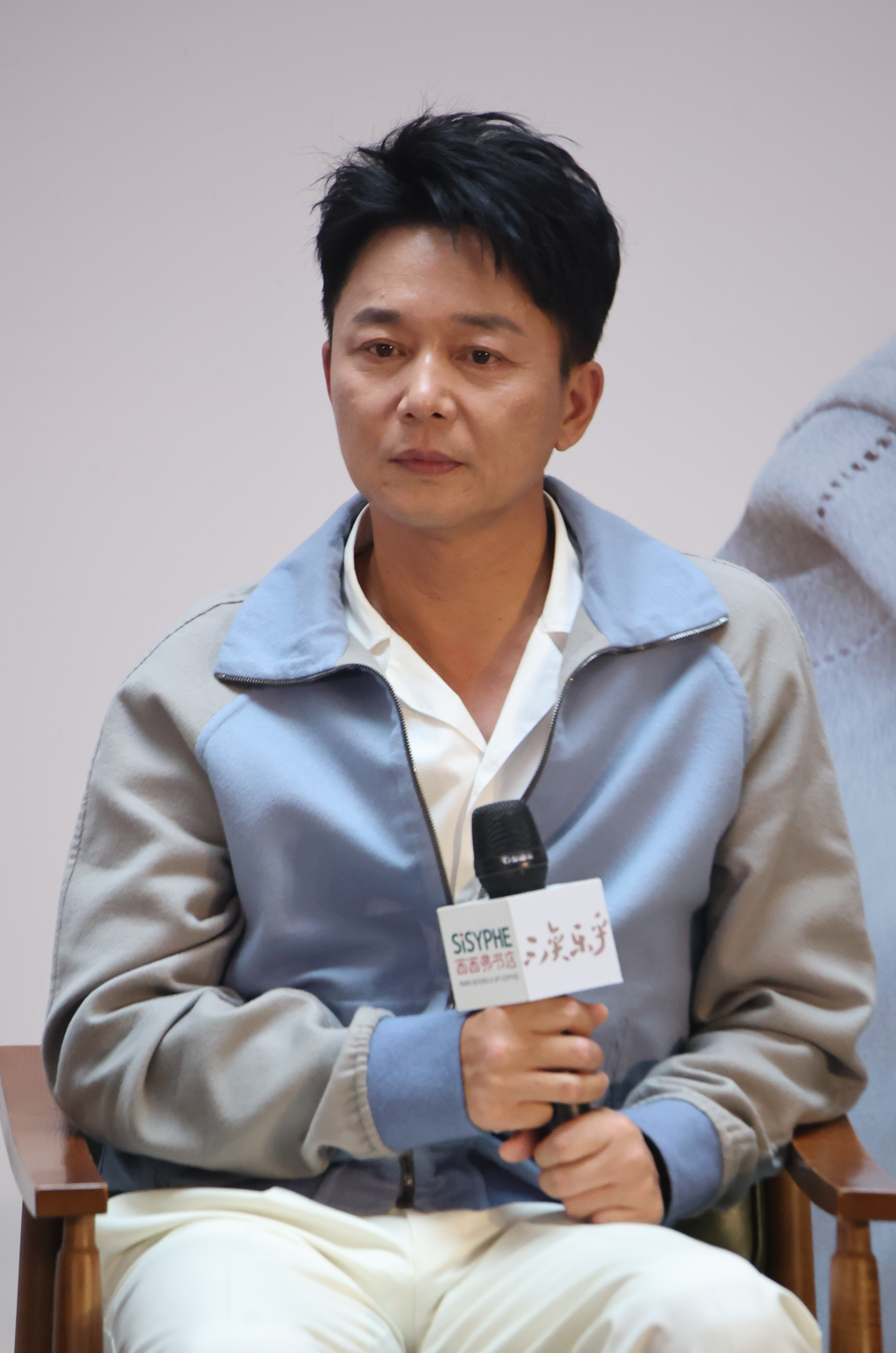
- Liu Yijun in 2024.
- Born: Liu Min (刘岷); 12 June 1970 (age 56); Xi'an, Shaanxi, China
- Education: Beijing Film Academy
- Occupation: Actor
- Years active: 2000–present
- Agent: Daylight Entertainment Television Ltd.
- Children: Liu Yitong

Chinese name
- Traditional Chinese: 劉奕君
- Simplified Chinese: 刘奕君
Transcriptions
Standard Mandarin
- Hanyu Pinyin: Liú Yìjūn

Birth name
- Traditional Chinese: 劉岷
- Simplified Chinese: 刘岷
Transcriptions
Standard Mandarin
- Hanyu Pinyin: Liú Mǐn

Liu Yijun (Chinese: 刘奕君, born 12 June 1970) is a Chinese actor. He graduated from the Beijing Film Academy. Liu is known for his television roles in The Disguiser (2015), Nirvana in Fire (2015) and Surgeons (2017); and has been nominated for the Golden Eagle Awards and Magnolia Awards.

== Biography ==
On 12 June 1970, Liu was born Liu Min into an intellectual family near the Xi'an Film Studio (now Xiying Group) in Xi'an, Shaanxi. His parents were geologists. In his youth, his father took him to study Sichuan opera under actor Qu Guoqiang.

In 1991, he was assigned to Xi'an Film Studio after graduating from Beijing Film Academy. In 1994, he resigned from Xi'an Film Studio and joined Ningbo Television as a director. During this period, his work Walking in the Human World won the second prize of the Star Award. In 1998, he resigned from Ningbo Television and went to Beijing alone.

In 2014, director Kong Sheng invited Liu to star as Xie Yu, the Marquis of Ningguo, in Nirvana in Fire. He had a supporting role as Wang Tianfeng in The Disguiser, for which he was nominated as the Best Supporting Actor at the 22nd Shanghai TV Festival.

In 2017, His classmate Zhang Jiayi introduced him to portray police officer Lian Zhong in Undercover. In the same year, he co-starred with Jin Dong and Bai Baihe in "Surgeons". Liu has also appeared in major roles in time travel loop series Reset (2022) and period fantasy series Guardians of the Dafeng (2024).

== Personal life ==
Liu has a son named Liu Yitong, who is also an actor.

== Filmography ==
=== Film ===
Year	English title	Chinese title	Role	Ref.
2000		生死兄弟情	Liu Guoqiang	
2002		我的心唱给你听		
2007		雨伞斑斓	Su Haifan	
2008		温凉珠	Liu Jueyang	
2008	Reborn	重生	He Liesheng	
2010	Death and Glory in Changde	喋血孤城	Chen Xuyun	

=== Television series ===
Year	English title	Chinese title	Role	Ref.
2000	Romantic Journey	浪漫之旅	Lu Xin	
2000	Human, Ghost and Love	人鬼情缘	Ning Caichen	
2000	Glorious Journey	光荣之旅	Lin Huan	
2000		回头是爱	An Xiaohu	
2001	The VI Group of Fatal Case	重案六组	Zhou Yaping	
2002	Modern Family	摩登家庭	Xiao Yuntian	
2002		魂断秦淮	Xiang Mao	
2003		大染坊	Zhao Dongchu	
2004	Genghis Khan	成吉思汗	Jochi Khan	
2004	Beautiful Grassland Is My Home	美丽的草原我的家	Xiao Zhejiang	
2004	The Great Prime Minister	大清官	Na Shan	
2006	Initiating Prosperity	开创盛世	Feng Deyi	
2007	Locust Tree	大槐树	Lin Jun	
2008	Top-secret Escort	绝密押运	Xiang Luoyang	
2008	Track for Dream	追梦英雄	Zhang Xueliang	
2008	Meditations on White Birth Forest	静静的白桦林	Zhao Yifan	
2009	Jade Phoenix	翡翠凤凰	Yang Jipin	
2009		北方有佳人	Xia Xizun	
2009	Women	女工	Bai Erbao	
2010		南下	Chen Jiashan	
2010	Losing Los Angeles	迷失洛杉矶	Physician Dong	Cameo
2010	Red Cradle	红色摇篮	Deng Zihui	
2010		同龄人	Qi Heping	
2011	Night Falls in Chang'an	叶落长安	Zhang Jun	
2012	Grand Gold Vein	大金脉	Wu Fulai	
2013		大盛魁	Sun Wenju	
2013	Mao Zedong	毛泽东	Wang Jingwei	
2013		瞒天过海	Huang Heping	
2014		天下一碗	Liu Mosha	
2014	Romance of Our Parents	父母爱情	Ouyang Rui	
2014	May December Love	大丈夫	Teacher Zhao	Cameo
2014	All Quiet in Peking	北平无战事	Liu Yun	
2015		永不低头	Wu Chongda	
2015	Tiger Mom	虎妈猫爸	Teacher Tang	Cameo
2015	The Disguiser	伪装者	Wang Tianfeng	
2015	Nirvana in Fire	琅琊榜	Xie Yu	
2015	Love Me If You Dare	他来了，请闭眼	Pei Ze	Guest appearance (Ep 5-9)
2015	Legend of Li Bing	李冰传奇	Li Bing	
2015	Two Families From Wenzhou	温州两家人	Shi Shengtian	
2015	Legend of Mi Yue	芈月传	Tang Mie	
2016	Marshal Peng Dehuai	彭德怀元帅	Coastal Team Leader	Cameo
2016	So Young	致青春	Zhou Liang	Guest appearance
2017	Surgeons	外科风云	Yang Fan	
2017	Undercover	卧底归来	Lian Zhong	
2017	Monkey Stamps	猴票	Zhou Santao	
2017	Lost Love in Times	醉玲珑	Heavenly Emperor	Guest appearance
2018	Great Expectations	远大前程	Zhang Wanlin	
2018	Promise	誓言	Jiateng Bowen	
2018	Legend of Fuyao	扶摇	Qi Zhen	
2018	Age of Legends	橙红年代	Nie Wanfeng	
2018	Royal Highness	到明朝当王爷之杨凌传	Hongzhi Emperor	Guest appearance
2019	Love Journey	一场遇见爱情的旅行	Li Qifeng	Guest appearance
2019	Last One Standing	无主之城	Chen Li	
2019	Sword Dynasty	剑王朝	Emperor	
2019	Jue Jing Zhu Jian	绝境铸剑		
2020	Hunting	猎狐	Wang Bolin	
2020	Kidnapping Game	绑架游戏	Shen Hui	
2020	The Legend of Xiao Chuo	燕云台	Xiao Siwen	
2022	Reset	张成	Zhang Cheng	
2024	Guardians of the Dafeng	大奉打更人	Wei Yuan	
2025	Footprints of Change	足迹	Wen Pu	
2025	Mobius	不眠日	Jiang Yu Wen	
TBA	Five Tigers of Shanghai	上海五虎	Huang Kun	
	Nowhere to Hide	无处躲藏	Zhao Dachuan	
	Detective	侦探语录		
	Being a Hero	冰雨火	Yang Xingquan	
	A Young Couple	加油！小夫妻		

== Awards and nominations ==
Year	Award	Category	Nominated work	Results	Ref.
2000	18th Golden Eagle Awards	Best Actor	Sheng Si Xiong Di Qing	Nominated	
2016	22nd Shanghai Television Festival	Best Supporting Actor	The Disguiser	Nominated	
2018	5th The Actors of China Award Ceremony	Outstanding Actor (Sapphire category)	N/A	Won	
2019	25th Shanghai Television Festival	Best Supporting Actor	Great Expectations	Nominated	
