= Nirvana in Fire =

2015 Chinese historical drama television series

- Promotional poster
- Chinese: 琅琊榜
- Hanyu Pinyin: Lángyá Bǎng
- Genre: Wuxia; Historical; Politics
- Based on: Lang Ya Bang by Hai Yan
- Written by: Hai Yan
- Directed by: Kong Sheng; Li Xue
- Starring: Hu Ge; Liu Tao; Wang Kai
- Theme music composer: Meng Ke
- Opening theme: Main Theme by Meng Ke
- Ending theme: When the Wind Blows by Hu Ge
- Country of origin: China
- Original language: Mandarin
- No. of episodes: 54 (list of episodes)

Production
- Producer: Hou Hongliang
- Production locations: Hengdian World Studios; Xiang Shan Studios
- Cinematography: Sun Molong
- Editor: Li Gang
- Camera setup: Multiple-camera setup
- Running time: 40–45 minutes
- Production companies: Shandong Film & TV Production Co., Ltd. Daylight Entertainment (Dongyang) Television Ltd.

Original release
- Network: Dragon TV; Beijing TV
- Release: September 19 – October 15, 2015

Related
- Nirvana in Fire II: The Wind Blows in Chang Lin

Nirvana in Fire (Chinese: 琅琊榜; pinyin: Lángyá Bǎng) is a 2015 Chinese historical drama and political thriller based on Hai Yan's book Lang Ya Bang (瑯琊榜). It was directed by Kong Sheng and Li Xue, and stars Hu Ge, Liu Tao and Wang Kai as Mei Changsu, Princess Nihuang and Prince Jing. The series tells the story of Lin Shu, who, under the alias Mei Changsu, enters the capital of Liang to seek justice for a conspiracy that labeled his family as traitors 12 years before. It originally aired two episodes daily on Beijing TV and Dragon TV, Monday through Sunday from 19:30 to 21:00, from September 19 to October 15, 2015.

The drama was a commercial and critical success, surpassing 100 million streaming views by its second day, and receiving a total number of views on iQiyi of over 3.3 billion by the end of the series. Nirvana in Fire was considered a social media phenomenon, generating 3.55 billion posts on Sina Weibo that praised its characters and story-line. As of December 2016, it has a total view of 13 billion views as reported by VLinkage.

The drama was also one of the recipients of the Outstanding Television Drama Award at the Flying Apsaras Awards, the highest government honor given for outstanding achievement in the television industry. Kong Sheng also won the Outstanding Director Award for his work in Nirvana in Fire. In 2016, SARFT recognized the series as one of the top 20 most outstanding dramas of the year. It was also nominated for the Magnolia Award for Best Television Series at the 22nd Shanghai Television Festival.

Its sequel, Nirvana in Fire 2, aired from December 2017 to February 2018. At the end of 2020, Daylight Productions announced that a third season is currently in the works.

== Synopsis ==
In 6th-century China, there was a war between feudal Northern Wei and Southern Liang dynasties. The Liang commander general, Lin Xie, his 19-year-old son, Lin Shu, and the Chiyan Army defeated hostile Wei forces. However, when the Chiyan were weakened from the battle, they were massacred under the Emperor's orders. Unknown to the king, the Chiyan were framed by political rivals, who claimed that they were conspiring a rebellion with the then-crown prince, Prince Qi. As a result, Prince Qi and members of the Lin manor were also unjustly executed. Qi's mother, Consort Chen, and Lin Shu's mother, sister of the king, committed suicide.

Lin Shu survived but was poisoned by the Poison of the Bitter Flame. To save his life, the master of Langya Hall, Lin Chen, gave him a treatment that ultimately led to Lin Shu's altered appearance and weakened state. For the next twelve years, he establishes the Jiang Zuo Alliance and becomes chief of the pugilist world as Mei Changsu. Lin Shu then returns to the capital during the fight for the throne between Prince Yu and Prince Xian. He uses this opportunity to restore his family's innocence as well as secretly help his best friend and cousin, the unfavored Prince Jing, become Emperor.

Under the name Su Zhe, Lin Shu becomes a strategist, who supports Prince Yu on the surface. He helps him take down the Crown Prince and his powerful ally, Marquess Xie Yu. Secretly, he assists Prince Jing as he rises in power and favor. While also investigating Xie Yu, Lin Shu discovers new details in the Chiyan conspiracy. He realizes that Xia Jiang, head of the Xuan Jing Bureau, was the instigator who framed Prince Qi and the Chiyan Army so that Prince Qi could not dissolve the Xuan Jing Bureau when he becomes emperor.

After the Crown Prince falls from grace, Prince Yu and his own strategist, Qin Banruo, become suspicious of Mei Changsu after they see Prince Jing's sudden rise in power. Although he is advised to stop advancing for the throne, Prince Yu forms an alliance with Xia Jiang, who agrees to help him to prevent the Chiyan case from being re-investigated under Prince Jing, for fear that the prince would uncover Xia's lies. Despite their plan to use the capture of Wei Zheng, former Lieutenant of Chiyan Army under Lin Shu, to create bad blood between Prince Jing and his father, the plan backfires, with Xia Jiang arrested and his Bureau seized and searched. Prince Yu's previous crimes are also revealed, causing him to be demoted and put under house arrest. Qin Banruo later persuades him to hold a rebellion while his father is away at the Spring Hunt with Prince Jing and Mei Changsu.

Despite arriving with a more powerful army compared to the small number of soldiers stationed at the Hunt, Prince Yu fails. He later commits suicide in prison. Meanwhile, Xia Jiang escapes prison during the rebellion attempt and deduces that Mei Changsu is Lin Shu. He attempts to regain the Emperor's trust by uncovering Mei's identity and accusing Prince Jing of conspiring with the strategist as the reason for the prince's quick rise in power. Although the Emperor imprisons Xia Jiang again, he attempts to kill Mei Changsu to prevent further messes, but is stopped by Prince Jing.

Together, Prince Jing and Mei Changsu plan for the reopening of the Chiyan case. At the Emperor's birthday celebration, the Prince has Grand Princess Liyang, the wife of Xie Yu, bring up the case in front of the emperor with evidence from Xie Yu's confession. Although angered by the sudden accusation of his mistakes, the Emperor is rendered powerless and finally agrees to reopen the case. After investigating, he pronounces Prince Qi, Lin Xie, Lin Shu, and the entire Chiyan army innocent.

After accomplishing his mission, Mei Changsu hears news of Northern Wei forces taking advantage of the political unrest by invading Da Liang. He resolves to take up arms to drive off the Southern forces (Da Yu), as that is what Lin Shu would have done. Mei takes Lin Chen's medication, which gives himself strength for three months, so he can lead Liang forces to defeat the enemy. He ultimately does not return to the capital. Several years later, Prince Jing becomes the new Emperor. When Commander Meng Zhi requests for Emperor Jing to name the newly merged militia, he names it "Chang Lin" army, in honor of Lin Shu and Mei Chang Su.

== Cast ==
Main cast

- Hu Ge as Mei Changsu/Su Zhe/Lin Shu

- Zhang Zhehan as teenage Lin Shu

- Liu Tao as Princess Mu Nihuang

- Pan Xiao Yang as teenage Nihuang

- Wang Kai as Xiao Jingyan, Prince Jing

Jiang Zuo Alliance

- Leo Wu as Fei Liu
- Zhou Qi Qi as Gong Yu
- Jin Dong as Lin Chen
- Wang Hong as Li Gang
- Zhao Yi Long as Zhen Ping
- Zhong Wei Hua as Physician Yan
- Wei Wei as Tong Lu
- Shan Ying Zhe as Nie Feng
- Li Shuai as Wei Zheng
- Liu Hong Yuan as Han Li
- Liu Hong Chao as An Rui
- Gong Fang Min as Sir Shisan

Others

- Wang Ou as Qin Banruo
- Jin Feng as Junniang
- Wang Chen Yi Xian as Princess Xuanji
- Fu Tao as Lu Yuan
- Yan Jie as Zhuo Qingyao
- Liu Hao Ming as Zhuo Dingfeng
- Qiao Xin as Yuwen Nian
- Guo Dong Yue as Prince Yuwen Xuan
- Liu Shu Chen as Madam Zhuo
- Sun Meng Jia as Xiaoxin

Liang Royal Family

- Victor Huang as Xiao Jinghuan, Prince Yu
- Liu Min Tao as Concubine Jing
- Ding Yong Dai as the Emperor
- Gao Xin as Xiao Jingxuan, Crown Prince Xian
- Zhang Yan Yan as Grand Princess Liyang
- Fang Xiao Li as Empress Yan
- Yang Yu Ting as Noble Consort Yue
- Ningwen Tong as Prince Ji
- Ji Chen as Xiao Jingyu, Prince Qi
- Zheng Yu Zhi as Grand Empress Dowager
- Lina Chen as Consort Hui

Royal Court and nobles

- Chen Long as Meng Zhi
- Tan Xi He as Gao Zhan
- Zhang Ling Xin as Xia Dong
- Wang Yong Quan as Xia Jiang
- Wang Jinsong as Marquis Yan Que
- Cheng Hao Feng as Xiao Jingrui
- Guo Xiao Ran as Yan Yujin
- Liu Yijun as Marquis Xie Yu
- Zhang Xiao Qian as Mu Qing
- Kuang Mu Ye as Xie Bi
- Sui Yu Meng as Xie Qi
- Zheng Sheng Li as General Lin Xie
- Feng Hui as Shen Zhui
- Lee Duo as Cai Quan
- Liu Guanlin as Xia Chun
- Sui Shuyang as Xia Qiu
- Zhang Yujian as Lie Zhanying
- Liu Yang as General Qi Meng
- Zhang Ju Ming as Xiao Tingsheng

== Production ==
=== Background ===
In April 2011, Shandong Television Media Group acquired the film adaption rights for the popular 2007 internet novel written by Hai Yan, Lang Ya Bang, which has been called the "Chinese version of The Count of Monte Cristo". Producer Hou Hongliang thought that the original novel conveyed the kind of emotion people are most attracted to, the characters' inner strength and revenge, and therefore decided to adapt the novel for television. The series' overall investment of the costume drama was more than one hundred million yuan, and the director and producer strived for majestic atmosphere with poetic, beautiful images.

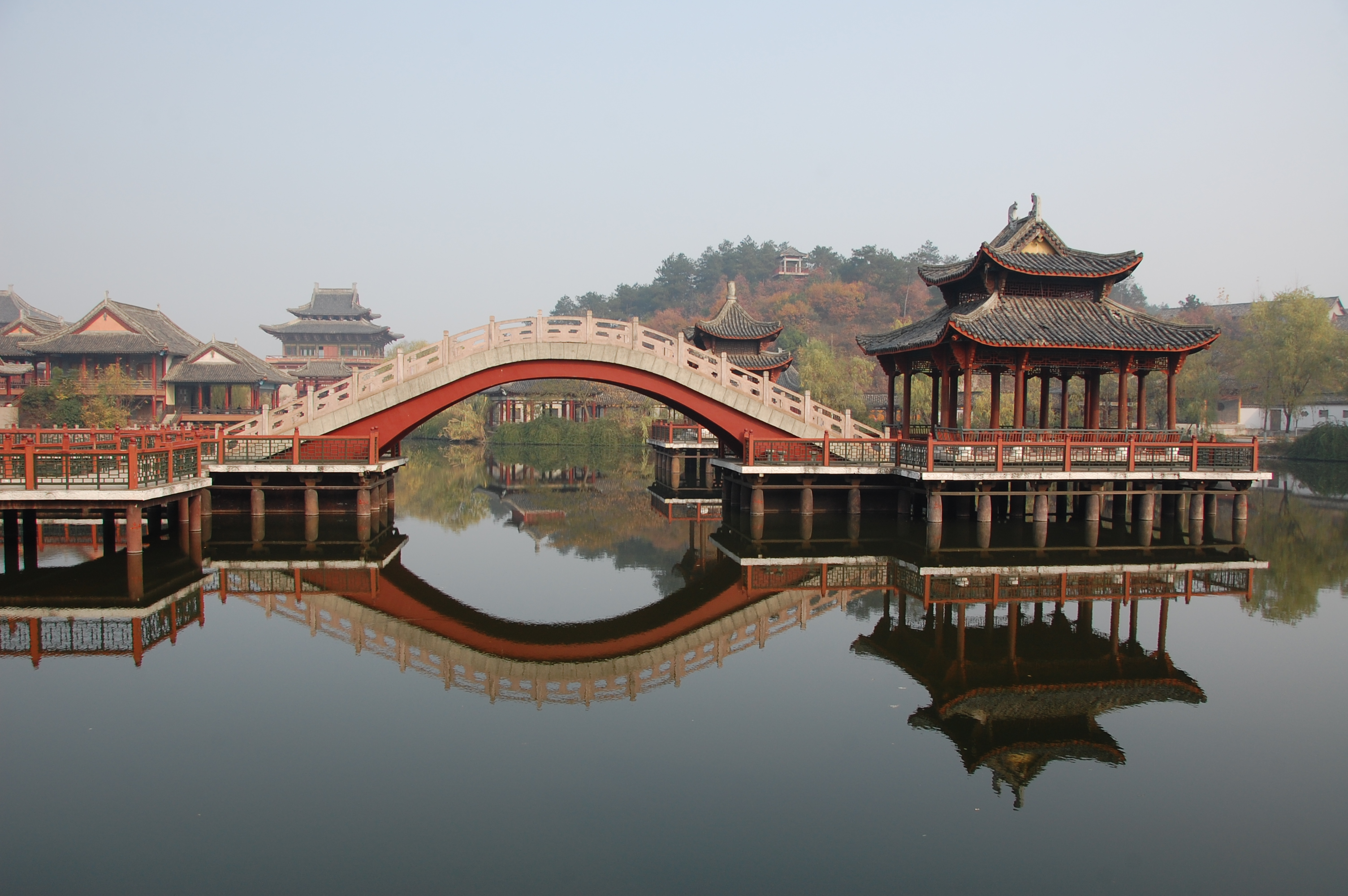
Set at Hengdian World Studios used as part of Marquise Xie Yu's manor

Director Kong Sheng and Hou Hongliang, who have been friends for 20 years, have worked together in The Age of Iron, Chuang Guandong, All Quiet in Peking, and The Line and other television productions. The original author, Hai Yan, said that she had no intention to make Lang Ya Bang into a television series, but Shandong producers encouraged her to do so, while also offering her the role as the drama's screenwriter, despite the fact that she had no such experience. The writing of the script lasted from mid-October 2012 to April 2013. Hai Yan stated that the story "will certainly be changed in details, but the framework, the characters and the plot is set to no major changes..., we are most concerned about the preservation of the outcome of Mei Changsu. I think, according to my personal standards, 80% of the script is original." Hou Hongliang said in earlier interviews that the series "highlights justice, patriotism and brotherhood".

Although it was not intended for any historical backstory corresponding to a certain dynasty, for the sake of the costumes, props and set designs, Nirvana in Fire was set during the Northern and Southern dynasties. Hou Hongliang stated that "characters will be relatively free flowing, in line with ancient individuals that are typically imagined."

Notable members of production include Sun Molong and Li Gang as directors of photography, Meng Ke as head composer, Jiang Guangtuo in charge of the dubbing, Liu Jie as the stunt director, Wang Huo, Su Zhiyong and Shao Changyong as the artistic designers, Ru Mei Qi as the fashion designer, Kong Gezi in charge of visual effects, and Liu Lei in charge of sound recordings.

The original Chinese title of the series means "The List from Langya", a list that gathers the most talented people of the fictional land in the story. The English title Nirvana in Fire was chosen to attract foreign viewers and reflects the main character Mei Changsu's suffering and his ultimate liberation "from an endless cycle of personal reincarnations".

=== Shooting ===
It was announced in mid-December 2013 that Hu Ge, Victor Huang, Wang Kai and Chen Long would act as Mei Changsu, Prince Yu, Prince Jing and Meng Zhi in the drama. When the cast and crew were formally established, they officially started shooting on February 12, 2014, at Hengdian World Studios. The shooting was separated into three groups, shooting at Hengdian, Xiangshan Global Studios, western Zhejiang grasslands, Wuxi and others. Location shooting was finished in June 2014, and entered post-production.

== Original soundtrack ==
Nirvana in Fire Original Soundtrack (OST)
- Album cover

Soundtrack album by Various artists
- Released: October 26, 2015
- Genres: Mandopop; Instrumental
- Length: 61:33
- Language: Mandarin
- Producer: Meng Ke

"When the Wind Blows (风起时)", sung by Hu Ge, is the main theme song of the drama, with "Faded Beauty (红颜旧)" and "Loyal Blood Forever Runs Red (赤血长殷)" acting as insert songs. The rest of the tracks are instrumental and performed by various artists. "When the Wind Blows" was composed by Meng Ke, with lyrics written by Hai Yan. "Faded Beauty" was composed by Zhao Jialin and written by Yuan Liang. "Loyal Blood Forever Runs Red" was composed by Yu Haihang and written by Qing Yan and Bing Feng.

"Ask the Sky (问天)" by Alfred Hui (许廷铿) and "Can Bear More (可以背负更多)" by Jinny Ng (吳若希) served as Nirvana in Fire's Cantonese opening and ending songs during its TVB broadcast.

Nirvana in Fire Original Television Soundtrack (《琅琊榜》电视剧原声带)

No.	Title	Lyrics	Music	Singer	Length
1.	"When the Wind Blows (风起时)"	Hai Yan	Meng Ke	Hu Ge	3:12
2.	"Faded Beauty (红颜旧)"	Yuan Liang	Zhao Jianlin	Liu Tao	3:45
3.	"Loyal Blood Forever Runs Red (赤血长殷)"	Qing Yan, Bing Feng	Yu Haihang	Wang Kai	4:46
4.	"March (行进)"		Meng Ke		1:18
5.	"Tense Stalemate (紧张对峙)"		Meng Ke		1:06
6.	"Expansive (开阔)"		Meng Ke		1:26
7.	"Strategise (谋划)"		Meng Ke		3:57
8.	"Interlude (插曲)"		Meng Ke		2:14
9.	"Deception (诡计)"		Meng Ke		2:53
10.	"Emotions (情感) (Bawu ver.)"		Meng Ke		1:36
11.	"Emotions 2"		Meng Ke		3:43
12.	"Emotions 3"		Meng Ke		1:52
13.	"Conversation (谈话)"		Meng Ke		4:26
14.	"Suspense (悬疑)"		Meng Ke		2:01
15.	"Suspense (Xiao ver.)"		Meng Ke		1:36
16.	"Chasing (追赶)"		Meng Ke		1:13
17.	"Last Judgement (最后的审判)"		Meng Ke		2:36
18.	"Main Theme (主题)"		Meng Ke		4:06
19.	"Main Theme 2 (主题2)"		Meng Ke		3:21
20.	"Battle Situation (战争场面)"		Meng Ke		2:31
21.	"Battle Situation 2 (战争场面2)"		Meng Ke		1:21
22.	"Race Against Time (争分夺秒)"		Meng Ke		1:36
23.	"Ambience (背景氛围音乐)"		Meng Ke		2:11
24.	"Suspense 3 (悬疑3)"		Meng Ke		1:10
25.	"Emotional Music (情绪音乐)"		Meng Ke		0:41
26.	"Women's Theme (女主题)"		Meng Ke		1:15
27.	"Humour, Lively (幽默，欢快)"		Meng Ke		1:05
28.	"Humour 2 (幽默2)"		Meng Ke		0:47
29.	"Longing (思念)"		Meng Ke		1:00
30.	"Stand-off Between Father and Son (父子拔剑)"		Meng Ke		2:13
Total length:					61:33+

== Reception ==
=== Critical response ===
The series garnered critical acclaim, with many positive reviews and discussions surfacing on the internet through Weibo. It topped viewership ratings in fifty cities in China and enjoyed high audience ratings in Taiwan (average: 1.6%, highest: 2.52%). The drama is also immensely popular overseas and has been translated to and dubbed in different languages. On CJ E&M's cable channel China Television, the drama set a record of 1.8% (0.8% nationally) in the Seoul region.

People's Daily praised the production's attention to historical detail, from clothing to etiquette, and highlighted it as one of the reasons audiences could buy the premise. Week in China wrote that "the theme of correcting the wrongs of an emperor and pursuing justice for a faithful few clearly resonates with the viewers – especially given the ongoing debates in modern China about issues like the rule of law." The Straits Times called it an "accomplished hybrid of historical and idol drama", saying that the story puzzles the viewers until the veil falls off around episode 50 when "the excitement of discovery wears off".

Douban gave the drama 9.3 out of 10 from more than 435,000 user reviews, with the series being dubbed as "China's Game of Thrones" due to its popularity. As of February 2021, the rating on Douban has since risen to 9.4 with 530,958 reviews. Nirvana in Fire was included in SARFT's 2016 statement "Introduction to Good Dramas", as an example of "natural presentation" of Chinese heritage, with its success as evidence for Chinese culture's "great potential" in costume TV series.

On the other hand, the reception of the drama in Hong Kong was mixed, local TVB channel, which broadcast the series quite late, in May 2016, registered falling viewership ratings. Some viewers found it "boring" and "slow", while younger generations preferred to watch the episodes online, instead of waiting for the television broadcast, which can also explain the lower viewership ratings. Fans of the show were dissatisfied with the Cantonese dubbing, the changing of the opening and closing songs, as well as the station's decision to cut the series down to 47 episodes in total. Industry experts also theorized that Hong Kong audience may have been unfamiliar with this style of drama, and the actors were not as well known to them, either.

=== Cultural impact ===
Certain scenic spots in China have also been changed to Langya Ge (Langya Hall) to attract tourists. Although Anhui, Jiangsu and Shandong province all claim to be where the drama is set, Hai Yan clarified that the setting was fictitious. Due to its popularity in Korea, Tourbucket launched a "Lang Ya Bang" tour of the drama's film location. Fans reportedly wore Mei Changsu's signature cloak during the tour. The publications for the web novel was highly anticipated, with the number of pre-orders reaching new highs. At the 2015 Big Data Index of Culture and Entertainment Industry Conference, the character, Mei Changsu, was named the year's "most talked-about television character (online)". The success of the adaption ushered in the original book's sales increase by more than 3,300 percent on Amazon.

=== Ratings ===
- Highest ratings are marked in red, lowest ratings are marked in blue

China Dragon TV / Beijing TV premiere ratings (CSM50)
Episodes	Broadcast date	Dragon TV			Beijing TV		
Episodes	Broadcast date	Ratings (%)	Audience share (%)	Rank	Ratings (%)	Audience share (%)	Rank
1–2	September 19, 2015	0.482	1.38	10	0.574	1.64	6
3–4	September 20, 2015	0.587	1.65	8	0.594	1.67	7
5–6	September 21, 2015	0.517	1.48	10	0.573	1.64	6
7–8	September 22, 2015	0.544	1.56	9	0.529	1.52	10
9–10	September 23, 2015	0.690	1.98	4	0.603	1.73	8
11–12	September 24, 2015	0.749	2.11	4	0.531	1.50	9
13–14	September 25, 2015	0.694	2.00	4	0.661	1.92	5
15–16	September 26, 2015	0.739	2.07	4	0.649	1.82	5
17–18	September 27, 2015	0.730	1.99	3	0.523	1.43	5
19–20	September 28, 2015	0.655	1.82	3	0.604	1.68	4
21–22	September 29, 2015	0.727	1.97	4	0.833	2.26	3
23–24	September 30, 2015	0.751	1.99	4	0.832	2.21	3
25–26	October 1, 2015	0.671	1.97	4	0.825	2.41	3
27–28	October 2, 2015	0.702	2.11	4	0.831	2.50	2
29–30	October 3, 2015	0.715	2.08	4	0.720	2.10	3
31–32	October 4, 2015	0.865	2.47	3	0.755	2.15	4
33–34	October 5, 2015	0.794	2.24	5	0.869	2.45	4
35–36	October 6, 2015	0.928	2.55	5	0.977	2.69	4
37–38	October 7, 2015	0.897	2.35	3	1.044	2.73	1
39–40	October 8, 2015	1.081	2.99	2	0.691	1.91	6
41–42	October 9, 2015	1.055	2.90	2	1.017	2.79	3
43–44	October 10, 2015	1.057	2.84	3	1.185	3.18	1
45–46	October 11, 2015	1.161	3.11	2	1.223	3.28	1
47–48	October 12, 2015	1.063	3.03	2	1.254	3.57	1
49–50	October 13, 2015	1.072	2.96	3	1.196	3.30	1
51–52	October 14, 2015	0.987	2.76	4	1.085	3.03	1
53–54	October 15, 2015	1.159	3.27	1	1.050	2.96	2
Average ratings		0.809	2.269	4.2	0.834	2.366	4

=== Awards and nominations ===
Award	Category	Nominee	Result	ref.
15th "Wind from the East" Influential Entertainers	Entertainer of the Year	Hu Ge	Won	
15th "Wind from the East" Influential Entertainers	Most Powerful TV Actor of the Year	Jin Dong	Won	
15th "Wind from the East" Influential Entertainers	Most Popular TV Actor of the Year	Wang Kai	Won	
15th "Wind from the East" Influential Entertainers	Best Television Director of the Year	Kong Sheng	Won	
15th "Wind from the East" Influential Entertainers	Best Television Director of the Year	Li Xue	Won	
2016 iQiyi All-Star Carnival	Drama of the Year	Nirvana in Fire	Won	
2016 iQiyi All-Star Carnival	TV Actor of the Year	Hu Ge (also for The Disguiser and Good Times)	Won	
2016 iQiyi All-Star Carnival	TV Drama Producer of the Year	Hou Hongliang (also for The Disguiser)	Won	
30th Flying Apsaras Awards	Outstanding Television Drama (historical)	Nirvana in Fire	Won	
30th Flying Apsaras Awards	Outstanding Director	Kong Sheng	Won	
30th Flying Apsaras Awards	Outstanding Actor	Hu Ge	Nominated	
30th Flying Apsaras Awards	Outstanding Actress	Liu Tao	Nominated	
6th Macau International Television Festival	Best Television Producer	Hou Hongliang	Won	
6th Macau International Television Festival	Outstanding Television Series	Nirvana in Fire	Won	
7th China TV Drama Awards	Top Ten Television Series	Nirvana in Fire	Won	
7th China TV Drama Awards	Best Director	Kong Sheng, Li Xue	Won	
7th China TV Drama Awards	Best Actor	Hu Ge	Won	
7th China TV Drama Awards	Best Supporting Actor	Victor Huang	Won	
7th China TV Drama Awards	Most Popular Actor (Mainland China)	Wang Kai	Won	
7th China TV Drama Awards	Industry Contribution Award	Hou Hongliang (also for The Disguiser)	Won	
14th China's Annual Top List	Entertainer of the Year	Hu Ge	Won	
14th China's Annual Top List	Entertainer of the Year	Wang Kai	Won	
14th China's Annual Top List	Drama of the Year	Nirvana in Fire	Won	
Forbes China Original Culture Billboard Awards	Best Original TV Adaption	Nirvana in Fire	Won	
Weibo Night Awards Ceremony	Most Powerful Actor of the Year	Jin Dong	Won	
Weibo Night Awards Ceremony	Most Powerful Actress of the Year	Liu Tao	Won	
Weibo Night Awards Ceremony	Best Newcomer of the Year	Leo Wu	Won	
Weibo Night Awards Ceremony	Man of the Year	Wang Kai	Won	
Weibo Night Awards Ceremony	Best Performance by an Actress	Liu Min Tao	Won	
Weibo Night Awards Ceremony	Best Performance by an Actor	Liu Yijun	Won	
Weibo Night Awards Ceremony	Best Television Series Producer	Hou Hongliang	Won	
State Administration of Press, Publication, Radio, Film and Television	Top 20 Most Outstanding Dramas of 2015	Nirvana in Fire	Won	
1st China Quality Television Drama Ceremony	Quality Grand Award	Nirvana in Fire	Won	
1st China Quality Television Drama Ceremony	Audience Favorite TV Series (Dragon TV)	Nirvana in Fire	Won	
1st China Quality Television Drama Ceremony	Quality Performance Grand Award	Hu Ge (also for The Disguiser and Good Times)	Won	
1st China Quality Television Drama Ceremony	Best Director	Kong Sheng	Won	
1st China Quality Television Drama Ceremony	Best Director	Li Xue (also for The Disguiser)	Won	
1st China Quality Television Drama Ceremony	Best Producer	Hou Hongliang (also for The Disguiser)	Won	
1st China Quality Television Drama Ceremony	Most Popular Actress	Liu Tao (also for The Legend of Mi Yue)	Won	
1st China Quality Television Drama Ceremony	Most Marketable Actor	Hu Ge (also for The Disguiser and Good Times)	Won	
1st China Quality Television Drama Ceremony	Most Popular Actor	Wang Kai (also for The Disguiser)	Won	
19th Huading Awards	Best Drama	Nirvana in Fire	Won	
19th Huading Awards	Best Director	Kong Sheng, Li Xue	Nominated	
19th Huading Awards	Best Screenwriter	Hai Yan	Nominated	
19th Huading Awards	Best Actor	Hu Ge	Nominated	
19th Huading Awards	Best Actress (Ancient)	Liu Tao	Nominated	
19th Huading Awards	Best Newcomer	Leo Wu	Nominated	
19th Huading Awards	Best Producer	Hou Hongliang	Nominated	
22nd Shanghai Television Festival	Best Television Series	Nirvana in Fire	Nominated	
22nd Shanghai Television Festival	Best Director	Kong Sheng	Won	
22nd Shanghai Television Festival	Best Director	Li Xue	Won	
22nd Shanghai Television Festival	Best Screenwriter	Hai Yan	Nominated	
22nd Shanghai Television Festival	Best Actor	Hu Ge	Won	
22nd Shanghai Television Festival	Best Supporting Actor	Wang Kai	Nominated	
22nd Shanghai Television Festival	Best Supporting Actress	Liu Min Tao	Nominated	
8th Straits Film and Television Awards Ceremony	Most Popular Chinese TV Series	Nirvana in Fire	Won	
28th Golden Eagle Awards	Best Director	Kong Sheng, Li Xue	Nominated	
28th Golden Eagle Awards	Best Screenwriter	Hai Yan	Nominated	
28th Golden Eagle Awards	Best Actor (Audience's Choice for Actor)	Hu Ge	Won	
28th Golden Eagle Awards	Most Popular Actor	Hu Ge	Won	
National Copyright Administration (NCAC) Copyright Awards	Top Copyright Award	Lang Ya Bang	Won	
2016 LiTV OTT Entertainment Awards	Drama of the Year	Nirvana in Fire	Won	
2016 LiTV OTT Entertainment Awards	TV Actor of the Year	Hu Ge	Won	
3rd Hengdian Film and TV Festival of China	Jury Grand Award for Most Popular TV Series	Nirvana in Fire	Won	
8th China TV Drama Awards	Most Appealing Young Actor	Leo Wu	Won	
3rd Asia Rainbow TV Awards	Best Supporting Actor	Wang Kai	Won	
12th Chinese American Film Festival	Golden Angel Award for Best Chinese TV Series	Nirvana in Fire	Won	
11th National Top-Notch Television Production Award Ceremony	Outstanding Television Series	Nirvana in Fire	Won	

== International broadcast ==
Channel	Location	Broadcast start date	Note
Beijing TV, Dragon TV	Mainland China	September 19, 2015	Monday to Sunday 19:30–21:00 (two eps.)
San Francisco KTSF 26 Taiwan	United States	September 21, 2015	Monday to Friday 21:00–22:00
Chinese TV	South Korea	October 19, 2015	Monday to Friday 22:00 (two eps)
CTS Main Channel	Taiwan	November 3, 2015	Monday to Friday 21:00
OMNI.2 (ON)	Canada	November 15, 2015	Monday to Friday 22:00
OMNI AB	Canada	November 15, 2015	Monday to Friday 22:00
OMNI BC	Canada	November 15, 2015	Monday to Friday 22:00
KSCI Los Angeles	United States	December 10, 2015	Sunday to Friday 19:00–20:00
ELTA TV	Taiwan	January 26, 2016	Monday to Friday 21:00
LiTV	Taiwan	January 26, 2016	Monday to Friday 12:00
Galaxy TV	Japan	April 11, 2016	Monday to Friday 13:00–15:00
TVB Jade	Hong Kong & Malaysia	May 16, 2016	Everyday 21:30–22:30
Astro On Demand	Malaysia	May 16, 2016	Everyday 21:30–22:30
VV Drama (TVB version in original Mandarin language)	Singapore	August 29, 2016	Monday to Sunday 21:00–22:00
Astro Wah Lai Toi	Malaysia	April 1, 2017	Saturday and Sunday 16:00–18:00
Channel 3 Family	Thailand	September 11, 2018	Monday to Friday 16:45–18:00

The series is also available on streaming platform Viki.com, subtitled in English, Spanish, French, Romanian and Hungarian, among other languages.
