= The Thunder (TV series) =

2019 Chinese television series

- Promotional poster
- Chinese: 《破冰行动》
- Genre: Crime drama; Police procedural; True crime
- Screenplay by: Chen Yuxin
- Directed by: Fu Dongyu; Liu Zhangmu
- Starring: Huang Jingyu; Wang Jinsong; Wu Gang; Simon Yam
- Ending theme: "Zui Hao de Da An" by Sun Nan
- Country of origin: China
- Original language: Chinese
- No. of episodes: 48

Production
- Producers: Dai Ying; Liu Yanjun
- Production locations: Zhongshan, China; Hong Kong; Macau; Paris, France; Japan
- Production companies: iQiyi; Chinese Ministry of Public Security; Jingmo Films; Huanleyuanquan Pictures

Original release
- Network: iQiyi; CCTV-8
- Release: 10 May – 2 June 2019

The Thunder (Chinese: 破冰行动; pinyin: Pòbīng xíngdòng) is a 2019 Chinese web television series based on the actual events of Chinese authorities' raid of Boshe village in Guangdong province in December 2013. The series released on the Chinese streaming website iQiyi on 7 May 2019, followed by the television premiere on CCTV-8 three days later.

Filming of the series took place in Guangdong, Hong Kong, Macau, France and Japan during March and August 2018, with over thousands of police personnel took part in filming process.

== Cast ==
=== Main ===
- Huang Jingyu as Officer Li Fei
- Wang Jinsong as Lin Yaodong
- Wu Gang as Inspector Li Weimin
- Simon Yam as Undercover Officer Li Jianzhong (alias Zhao Jialiang)

=== Supporting ===
- Li Mozhi as Chen Ke
- Zhang Xilin as Ma Yunbo
- Gong Lei as Lin Zonghui
- Yang Hua as Lin Yaohua
- Tang Xu as Cai Yongqiang
- Yu Jiema as Ma Wen
- Qian Bo as Lin Shuibo
- Zhao Xuan as Lin Shengwu
- Ai Dong as Chen Guangrong
- Gao Ming as Vice Minister Hao
- Shi Dasheng as Su Jianguo
- Shi Yanjing as Wang Zhixiong
- Zhao Chengsun as Cui Zhenjiang
- Felix Lok as Tan Sihe
- Lu Siyu as Song Yang
- Chen Yiheng as Liu Haoyu
- Ka Chun-hung as Zhong Wei
- Song Hanhuan as Lin Can
- Chen Ning as Zuo Lan
- Liu Jianguo as Ke Jianhua
- Xiong Ruiling as Yu Hui
- Hao Bojie as He Ruilong
- Gao Jian as Cai Jun
- Zhang Xiaoyang as Lin Tianhao
- Li Fengqi as Lin Lan
- Bao Ma as Doctor Xiao
- Li Jiaxuan as Yang Liu
- Liu Yihan as Zhang Minhui
- Fa Zhiyuan as Yang Feng
- He Xun as Guan Xin
- Li Xiong as Huang Dacheng
- Luo Weilin as Liu Huaming
- Lai Yi as Zhou Kai
- Zhou Yue as Zhao Chao
- Yang Fengyu as Du Li
- Li Changhong as Chen Zili
- Feng Lizhou as Captain Qian
- Bu Wenhui as Su Kang
- Ou Xuanwei as Shen Yue
- Long Qingxia as Luo Jiayi
- Ma Xizhong as Luo Shaohong
- Xu Jingwei as Chen Wenze
- Ding Nan as Lin Jingwen
- Cai Xin as Ai Chao
- Wang Chengyang as Lin Shengwen
- Chen Jialun as Bao Xing

== Reception ==
=== Critical response ===
Wang Kaihao of the China Daily says the series bears resemblance of Breaking Bad, the fictional American series that compared to the actual event.

=== Accolades ===
Date	Award	Category	Nominee	Result	ref.
November 5, 2019	Golden Angel Award at the 15th China US Film Festival and China-US TV Festival	Best Actor of the Year	Wu Gang	Won	
November 6, 2019	The 3rd Yinchuan Internet Film Festival · Network Drama Unit	Best Online Drama Award	The Thunder	Won	
December 6, 2019	IQIYI Scream Night	Public Security Movie and TV Works of the Year	The Thunder	Won	
December 2019	Baidu Boiling Point	TV series of the year	The Thunder	Won	
December 10, 2019	The 26th Huading Awards	Best Producer of China Top 100 TV Series	Qin Zhengui, Dai Ying, Liu Yanjun	Won	
December 19, 2019	Sina Annual Film and Television Festival	Top Ten drama series of the year	The Thunder	Won	
December 22, 2019	The 11th Macau International TV Festival	Golden Lotus Best Supporting Actor Award	Ren Dahua	Won	
December 22, 2019	The 4th Jinguduo Network Film Festival	Popular Internet Drama of the Year	The Thunder	Won	
January 6, 2020	The 4th Fingertip Mobile Impact Summit Forum	Most influential online drama of the year	The Thunder	Won	
	26th Shanghai Television Festival	Best Television Series	The Thunder	Won	
	26th Shanghai Television Festival	Best Director	Fu Dongyu, Liu Zhangmu, Li Jinrui	Nominated	
	26th Shanghai Television Festival	Best Original Screenplay	Chen Yuxin, Li Li, Qin Yue	Won	
	26th Shanghai Television Festival	Best Supporting Actor	Wang Jinsong	Nominated	
	30th China TV Golden Eagle Award	Outstanding Television Series	The Thunder	Won	
	30th China TV Golden Eagle Award	Best Actor	Wang Jinsong	Nominated	
	30th China TV Golden Eagle Award	Best Screenwriter	Chen Yuxin	Nominated	
