= Wang Jinsong =

Chinese actor

- 王劲松
- Born: 15 November 1967 (age 58); Wuxi, Jiangsu, China
- Education: Jiangsu Theater Arts School
- Years active: 1997–present
- Agent(s): H&R Century Pictures

Chinese name
- Traditional Chinese: 王勁松
- Simplified Chinese: 王劲松
Transcriptions
Standard Mandarin
- Hanyu Pinyin: Wáng Jìnsōng

Wang Jinsong (Chinese: 王劲松, born 15 November 1967) is a Chinese actor best known for his television roles in Ming Dynasty in 1566 (2007), Nirvana in Fire (2015), Sparrow (2016), The Advisors Alliance (2017) and The Thunder (2019).

== Filmography ==
=== Film ===
Year	English title	Chinese title	Role	Notes
2012		红星闪耀	Zhao Gansheng	
2013	The Story of Zhou Enlai	周恩来的四个昼夜	Teacher Wang	
2019	The Long Bright Dark	嫌疑人		

=== Television series ===
Year	English title	Chinese title	Role	Notes
1997		新乱世佳人	Mao Zhiliang	
1999	Yang Zhou Ba Guai	扬州八怪	Jin Nong	
2001		平民大总统	Hu Hanmin	
2001		等你归来	Huang Huiguang	
2002	Da Ge	大哥	Chen Wenbao	
2003	The Cricket Master	蟋蟀大师	Ding San'er	
2003		椰岛顽童	Long Fei	
2004	The First Intimate Contact	第一次亲密接触	Qi Mingyuan	
2004	Qi Tian Qin Chai	倚天钦差	Heshen	
2005		破天荒	Li Kaifu	
2006	The Jinyiwei Guard	锦衣卫	Zhu Yujian	
2007	Ge Men	哥们	Wang Gang	
2007	Da Sao	大嫂	Fan Zhiyuan	
2007	Xue Se Xiang Xi	血色湘西	Mr. Qu	
2007		恰同学少年	Tang Xiangming	
2007	Ming Dynasty in 1566	大明王朝1566	Yang Jinshui	
2008	Golden Dusk	金色黄昏	Ma Yiguang	
2009	I'm a Boss	我是老板	Ma Yiping	
2010	National Anthem	国歌	Gu Yunfeng	
2010	The Field Evidence	现场铁证	Chen Yuan	
2010	Ya Mei	哑妹	Jiang Yunyang	
2011	My Passionate Youth	我的燃情岁月	Medic Chen	
2011	Borrow Gun	借枪	Yu Ting	
2011	Bullet Hole	弹孔	Xing Ziliang / Xing Ziyu	
2011	I'm A Special Soldier	我是特种兵	Lei Keming	
2012	Crossing Boundary	越境	Ye Cun	
2012	Brother Sea	兄弟海	Fang Longchang	
2012	Special Arms	我是特种兵之国之利刃2	Xie Zi	
2013	Jiang Hu Zheng Dao	江湖正道	Nie Shuanghui	
2013	Sleek Rat The Challenger	白玉堂之局外局	Gongsun Ce	
2013	Seeking My Own Future	明日已太远	Wei Renyi	
2014	Border Town	边城	Chitian Zhengfu	
2014	A Legend of Shaolin	少林寺传奇藏经阁	Ji Kong	
2014	All Quiet in Peking	北平无战事	Wang Pushen	
2015	The Orange Code	橙色密码	Yi Zhandeng	
2015	Nirvana in Fire	琅琊榜	Yan Que	
2016	Sisters	姐妹姐妹	Lu Shouyun	
2016	Sparrow	麻雀	Li Moqun	
2017	The Glory of Tang Dynasty	大唐荣耀	Emperor Suzong of Tang	
2017	Hot Hearts Black Earth	黑土热血	Ding Feng	
2017	The Advisors Alliance	大军师司马懿之军师联盟	Xun Yu	
2017	My Three Moms and Two Dads	我的仨妈俩爸	Wang Fu	Cameo
2018	Pursuit	法网追凶	Tian Feng	
2018	Xing Huo Yun Wu Jie	星火云雾街	He Feiwu	
2018	Hard Bone: Desperate Way To Return	硬骨头之绝地归途	Li Xiaomin	
2018	Tu Bing Zai Tu Ji	突击再突击	Ouyang Rushan	
2018	Legend of Fuyao	扶摇	Zhangsun Jiong	
2018	The Drug Hunter	猎毒人	Chu Tiannan	Cameo
2018	The Destiny of White Snake	天乩之白蛇传说	Baicai Xianjun	
2018	New Smiling, Proud Wanderer	新笑傲江湖	Feng Qingyang	
2019	Pushing Hands	推手	Mei Daoyuan	
2019	The Brightest Star in the Sky	夜空中最闪亮的星	Zheng Weijun	
2019	The Thunder	破冰行动	Lin Yaodong	
2019	The Lost Tomb 2: Explore with the Note	怒海潜沙&秦岭神树	Professor Qi	
2019	Detective Ke Chen	神探柯晨	Bai Gui	Cameo
2019	Hot-Blooded Youth	热血少年	Sang Jieqiao	
2019	Royal Nirvana	鹤唳华亭	Lu Shiyu	
2020	New World	新世界	Tian Huaizhong	Cameo
2020	Ever Night 2	将夜2	Master Qishan	
2020	Autumn Cicada	秋蝉	Qingquan Shangye	
2020	Trace	痕迹	Security Officer	
2020	In a Class of Her Own	漂亮书生	Feng Jichang	
2020	The Promise of Chang'an	长安诺	Xiao Shangyuan	
2021	Decisive Victory	大决战	Chiang Kai-shek	
TBA	Peace in Palace, Peace in Chang'an	天下长安	Xiao Yu	
TBA	Drawing Sword 3	亮剑3之雷霆战将	Liu Bojun	
TBA	The Imperial Age	江山纪	Liu Bowen	
TBA	The National Southwest Associated University And Us	我们的西南联大	Mei Yiqi	
TBA	The Controllers	掌中之物	Chen Jingyan	
TBA	If You Well Its Fine	若你安好便是晴天		
TBA	Perfect Evidence	完美证据		
TBA	Being a Hero	冰雨火	Lin Dezan	
TBA	Love in Flames of War	良辰好景知几何		

== Awards and nominations ==
Year	Award	Category	Nominated work	Results	Ref.
2016	Good Actor Selection	Role Award	—N/a	Won	
2017	4th Hengdian Film and TV Festival of China	Best Supporting Actor	Sparrow	Won	
2018	12th Tencent Video Star Awards	Quality Television Actor	—N/a	Won	
2019	26th Huading Awards	Best Supporting Actor	The Thunder	Won	
2019	China TV Drama Awards	Charismatic Actor	The Thunder	Won	
2020	Jinri Toutiao Awards Ceremony	Role Model Actor	—N/a	Won	
2020	26th Shanghai Television Festival	Best Supporting Actor	The Thunder	Nominated	
2020	30th China TV Golden Eagle Award	Best Actor	The Thunder	Nominated	
2020	7th The Actors of China Award Ceremony	Best Actor (Sapphire)	—N/a	Pending	

=== Variety show ===
Year	English title	Chinese title	Role	Notes
2021	China in Classics	典籍里的中国	Li Shizhen	
