= Wang Ou =

Chinese actress

- Born: Wang Junmei (王俊美); October 28, 1982 (age 43); Nanning, Guangxi, China
- Other name: Angel Wang
- Occupations: Actress; Model
- Years active: 2005–present
- Agent

Chinese name
- Traditional Chinese: 王鷗
- Simplified Chinese: 王鸥
Transcriptions
Standard Mandarin
- Hanyu Pinyin: Wáng Ōu

Wang Ou (Chinese: 王鸥; pinyin: Wáng Ōu, born 28 October 1982), also known as Angel Wang, is a Chinese actress and model. She is known for playing Wang Manchun in Disguiser and Qin Banruo in Nirvana in Fire.

== Career ==
In 2003, Wang won the Most Photogenic Award from the CCTV Modeling Competition. She made her acting debut in the television series The Ultimate Triangle Line (2005) and gained attention as the leading actress in the film Prequel of the Dart Hero (2010).

She is best known for her roles in the historical television series Nirvana in Fire (2015) and the spy war drama The Disguiser (2015), which won her Huading Awards for Best Supporting Actress. She then starred in the family drama Full Love alongside Hawick Lau.

In 2017, she was cast in the historical epic The Rise of Phoenixes which co-stars Chen Kun and Ni Ni.

In 2018, she starred in the fantasy wuxia drama The Legend of Jade Sword as the female lead.

In 2019, Wang starred in the period drama Memories of Peking, and business romance drama Pushing Hands. She also featured in the fantasy epic drama Novoland: Eagle Flag as one of the major supporting characters. The same year she starred alongside Zhang Ruoyun in the spy drama Awakening of Insects.

== Filmography ==
=== Film ===
Year	English title	Chinese title	Role	Notes
2008	The Legend of Chinese	凤舞天下	Yun Zhu	
2010	Hua Lian	花恋	Piao'er	
2010	Prequel of the Dart Hero	镖行天下前传	Gu Pingan	
2016	Foolish Plans	发条城市	Jiang Tao	
TBA	Father	以父之名	Wang Xueqi	

=== Television series ===
Year	English title	Chinese title	Role	Notes
2005	The Ultimate Triangle Line	心戒	He Ru	
2007	Wo Hu Xing Dong 112	卧虎行动112	Liu Chun	
2008	Behind The Femininity	温柔的背后	Zhuo Ran	
2008	No Time to Lose	刻不容缓	Zhou Xin	
2011	Lies of The Femininity	温柔的谎言	Bao Lina	
2012	Scalper	手术刀	Chen Zihan	
2013	Tong Bai Hero	桐柏英雄	He Chuigu	
2013	The Patriot Yue Fei	精忠岳飞	Zhao Xiaoman	
2013	The Story of Mu Lan	花木兰传奇	Fu Ling	
2014	Hua Huo Hua Hong	花红花火	Tian Mingmei	
2015	Monthly Payment	月供	Li Na	
2015	The Disguiser	伪装者	Wang Manchun	
2015	Nirvana in Fire	琅琊榜	Qin Banruo	
2016	Blade Warrior	锻刀	Jiang Meilan	
2016	Happy MiTan	欢喜密探	Yuan Yu'er	
2017	Full Love	周末父母	Zhao Jia'ni	
2017	Above the Clouds	云巅之上	Xiao Xiao	
2017	Detective Dee the Fourth	神探狄仁杰之情花金人案	Ying Man	
2018	The Legend of Jade Sword	莽荒纪	Yu Wei	
2018	The Rise of Phoenixes	天盛长歌	Hua Qiong	
2018	Huangfu Highly Skilled Doctor	皇甫神医	Xiang Ling	
2019	The Neighbour is My Ex-Wife	我的冤家住对门	Luo Jie	
2019	Memories of Peking	芝麻胡同	Mu Chunhua	
2019	Pushing Hands	推手	Chen Yifan	
2019	Novoland: Eagle Flag	九州缥缈录	Su Shunxing	
2019	Awakening of Insects	惊蛰	Zhang Li	
2019	The Best Partner	精英律师		Cameo
2020	Hunting	猎狐	Wu Jiaqi	
2021	Good Life	生活万岁	Zeng Zhiting	

=== Variety show ===
Year	English title	Chinese title	Role	Notes
2016–present	Who's the Murderer	明星大侦探	Cast member	
2017	We Are In Love	我们相爱吧	Cast member	with Ming Dao
2020	My Little One 2	我家那闺女2	Cast member	

== Awards and nominations ==
Year	Award	Category	Nominated work	Result	Ref.
2015	7th China TV Drama Awards	Most Popular Supporting Actress	Nirvana in Fire	Nominated	
2016	22nd Shanghai Television Festival	Best Supporting Actress	The Disguiser	Nominated	
2016	19th Huading Awards	Best Supporting Actress	The Disguiser	Won	
2019	26th Huading Awards	Best Actress (Period drama)	Memories in Peking	Won	
2019	Golden Bud - The Fourth Network Film And Television Festival	Best Actress	Memories in Peking, Pushing Hands, Novoland: Eagle Flag, Awakening of Insects	Nominated	
2019	Golden Bud - The Fourth Network Film And Television Festival	Reputable Actress of the Year	Memories in Peking, Pushing Hands, Novoland: Eagle Flag, Awakening of Insects	Won	
2019	11th China TV Drama Awards	Acting Breakthrough Actress	—N/a	Won	
