= Yi Shu =

Hong Kong writer

Names
	Given name	Pen name
Trad.	倪亦舒	亦舒
Simp.	倪亦舒	亦舒
Pinyin	Ni Yishu	Yi Shu
Shanghainese; Romanisation	Nee Yeh-Su	Yeh-Su
Cantonese; Romanisation	Ngi Yik Sue	Yik Sue

Yi Shu or Isabel Nee Yeh-su (born 25 September 1946) is a popular Hong Kong writer. She is the younger sister of Ni Kuang. She has used other pen names, including Rose (玫瑰), Mui Fon (梅峰), Lok Hon (駱絳), and Luk Kwok (陸國).

== Childhood ==
Yi Shu, whose home town is Ningbo, Zhejiang, was born in Shanghai in 1946. She has five elder siblings and one younger brother. Her pet name was A-mei and her siblings would call her "Xiao Mei Tao". She arrived in Hong Kong with her younger brother when she was five. After graduation from Kiangsu and Chekiang Kindergarten and Nursery, Yi Shu studied at Sir Ellis Kadoorie Primary School and Ho Tung Technical School For Girls (later known as Hotung Secondary School). She was a studious pupil who received two distinctions and two credits in the HKCEE examination. In 1964, Yi Shu completed her studies in her secondary school; her schoolmistress gave her a comment: "She was touchy, emotional, and easy to get into a lather…" Consequently, her mother renamed her Ni Rong (倪容) (容 literally means "to tolerate"), in the hope of Yi Shu could become more calm and generous.

== Writing career ==
She had been a journalist of the Ming Pao at the age of 17 after graduation from her secondary school. When she was 27, she went to Manchester to study Hotel Management. She had been the wait staff department supervisor of a hotel in Taiwan (1977), PR manager of the now demolished Furama Hotel in Central, Hong Kong (1978), a top official of the Government Information Services in Hong Kong, as well as a screenwriter. Now, Yi Shu has migrated to Canada, continuing with her writing career. Her novels are mainly romance novels set in modern-day Hong Kong. She is also an essayist as well.

Organised by the Hong Kong Arts Development Council (HKADC), the 15th Hong Kong Arts Development Awards was held on 30 Oct 2021. Yi Shu was one of the recipients of the Award for Outstanding Contribution in Arts, for her keen observation and insights are expressed in her works such as novels, short proses and profiles.
