= Tiger Mom (TV series) =

- Promotional poster

Chinese name
- Traditional Chinese: 虎媽貓爸
- Simplified Chinese: 虎妈猫爸
Transcriptions
Standard Mandarin
- Hanyu Pinyin: Hǔmā, Māobà
- Genre: Comedy drama
- Written by: Li Xiao
- Directed by: Yao Xiaofeng
- Starring: Zhao Wei; Tong Dawei
- Country of origin: China
- Original language: Mandarin
- No. of episodes: 45

Production
- Production location: Beijing
- Production company: New Classics Media

Original release
- Network: Dragon TV, Tianjin TV
- Release: 3 May – 25 May 2015

Tiger Mom
- Traditional Chinese: 虎媽猫爸
- Simplified Chinese: 虎妈猫爸
- Literal meaning: Tiger Mother, Cat Father
Transcriptions
Standard Mandarin
- Hanyu Pinyin: Hǔmā, Māobà
- Wade–Giles: Hu³ma¹, Mao¹pa⁴
Yue: Cantonese
- Jyutping: Fu²maa¹, Maau¹baa¹

Tiger Mom (Chinese: 虎妈猫爸) is a 2015 Chinese television series starring Zhao Wei and Tong Dawei. It aired on Dragon TV and Tianjin TV from 3 May to 25 May 2015. The series revolves around a strong-willed disciplinarian tiger mother who faces mounting pressure raising her daughter, while her husband has an opposite view of how to raise their daughter. It marks Zhao Wei's return to television after a 5-year absence.

== Synopsis ==
Qian Qian is the school-aged daughter of Bi Sheng Nan (Zhao Wei) and Luo Su (Tong Dawei). After learning from others that the educational foundation starts in elementary school and witnessing first hand the difficult process of entering a great and prestigious school, Bi Sheng Nan realized that her daughter needs to catch up.

Determined to make sure her daughter is on par with the other kids, she has quickly grown into the role of a tiger mom while her easygoing husband Luo Su maintains that the happiness of Qian Qian is the most important, even if that means being academically behind. Mixed in the bag are two sets of opinionated grandparents and the reappearance of Luo Su’s ex-girlfriend.

== Cast ==
- Zhao Wei as Bi Sheng Nan
- Tong Dawei as Luo Su
- Ji Zihan as Luo Qian Qian
- Dong Jie as Tang Lin
- Kong Lin as sister Wu
- Pan Hong as Sun Ya Xian
- Li Kelan as Luo Dan
- Han Tongsheng as Bi Da Qian
- Cui Xinqin
- Han Qing
- Li Jia
- Guo Kaiming as Luo San Sheng
- Wang Sen as Bi Ran
- Liu Yijun as Teacher Tang

== Soundtrack ==
| No. | Title | Singer | Length |
|---|---|---|---|
| 1. | "Animal Forest (动物森林)" (Opening theme song) | Christine Fan |
| 2. | "Tired (累)" (Ending theme song) | Wang Gun |
| 3. | "Wont Return (不還)" | Claire Kuo |
| 4. | "The Thousandth Tears (一千萬次的淚水)" | Miu Zhu |

== Reception ==
=== Salary & ROI ===
According to New Classic Media's IPO application, Zhao Wei's salary was 42.7925 million yuan, equally 1 million yuan per episode. And the ROI of the show was 300%.

=== Controversy ===
After the series, Shanghai Pudong New District Court receiving a case that a man sued Zhao Wei because her stares were too intense in the series. The man alleged that Zhao's stare caused him "spiritual damage".

=== Ratings ===
- Highest ratings are marked in red, lowest ratings are marked in blue

| Broadcast date | Episode | Dragon TV CSM50 | | | Tianjin TV CSM50 | | |
| Broadcast date | Episode | Ratings (%) | Audience share (%) | Rank | Ratings (%) | Audience share (%) | Rank |
|---|---|---|---|---|---|---|---|
| May 3 | 1 | 0.711 | 2.159 | 4 | 0.696 | 2.112 | 5 |
| May 4 | 2-3 | 1.012 | 2.954 | 3 | 0.664 | 1.944 | 5 |
| May 5 | 4-5 | 1.136 | 3.325 | 2 | 0.686 | 2.019 | 4 |
| May 6 | 6-7 | 1.072 | 3.153 | 2 | 0.759 | 2.24 | 3 |
| May 7 | 8-9 | 1.120 | 3.266 | 2 | 0.867 | 2.551 | 3 |
| May 8 | 10-11 | 1.308 | 3.676 | 1 | 0.786 | 2.207 | 3 |
| May 9 | 12-13 | 1.125 | 3.182 | 1 | 0.671 | 1.895 | 3 |
| May 10 | 14-15 | 1.228 | 3.525 | 2 | 0.872 | 2.501 | 3 |
| May 11 | 16-17 | 1.269 | 3.572 | 2 | 0.889 | 2.512 | 3 |
| May 12 | 18-19 | 1.185 | 3.573 | 2 | 0.791 | 2.383 | 3 |
| May 13 | 20-21 | 1.263 | 3.805 | 2 | 0.800 | 2.402 | 3 |
| May 14 | 22-23 | 1.232 | 3.626 | 2 | 0.793 | 2.237 | 3 |
| May 15 | 24-25 | 1.336 | 3.86 | 1 | 0.782 | 2.235 | 3 |
| May 16 | 26-27 | 1.165 | 3.41 | 2 | 0.708 | 2.055 | 5 |
| May 17 | 28-29 | 1.395 | 4.007 | 2 | 0.797 | 2.286 | 4 |
| May 18 | 30-31 | 1.437 | 4.418 | 2 | 0.881 | 2.621 | 3 |
| May 19 | 32-33 | 1.480 | 4.442 | 2 | 0.822 | 2.456 | 3 |
| May 20 | 34-35 | 1.470 | 4.398 | 2 | 0.754 | 2.253 | 4 |
| May 21 | 36-37 | 1.439 | 4.27 | 2 | 0.880 | 2.608 | 3 |
| May 22 | 38-39 | 1.636 | 4.745 | 1 | 0.925 | 2.65 | 3 |
| May 23 | 40-41 | 1.712 | 5.025 | 1 | 0.903 | 2.635 | 3 |
| May 24 | 42-43 | 1.747 | 5.186 | 1 | 1.047 | 3.095 | 3 |
| May 25 | 44-45 | 1.828 | 5.414 | 1 | 1.1 | 3.258 | 3 |
| Average ratings | | 1.37 | - | - | 0.82 | - | - |

=== Awards and nominations ===
| Award | Category | Nominee | Result |
|---|---|---|---|
| 11th National Top-Notch Television Production Award Ceremony | Outstanding Television Series | Tiger Mom | Won |
| 1st China Quality Television Drama Ceremony | Quality Grand Award | Tiger Mom | Won |
| 1st China Quality Television Drama Ceremony | Audience Favorite TV Series (Dragon TV) | Tiger Mom | Won |
| 1st China Quality Television Drama Ceremony | Most Commercially Valuable Actor | Tong Dawei | Won |
| 19th Huading Awards | Best Director | Yao Xiaofeng | Won |
| 19th Huading Awards | Top 10 Dramas | Tiger Mom | Won |
| 17th Huading Awards | Best Director | Yao Xiaofeng | Nominated |
| 17th Huading Awards | Best Screenwriter | Shen Jie | Nominated |
| 17th Huading Awards | Best Actor | Tong Dawei | Won |
| 17th Huading Awards | Best Actress | Zhao Wei | Nominated |
| 17th Huading Awards | Best Supporting Actor | Guo Kaimin | Won |
| 17th Huading Awards | Best Producer | Huang Lan, Jing Lei | Won |
| 17th Huading Awards | Top 10 Dramas | Tiger Mom | Won |
| 13th Sichuan Television Festival | Best Actress | Zhao Wei | Nominated |
| 10th China Audience Television Festival | Top Ten Favorite Television Series | Tiger Mom | Won |
| 10th China Audience Television Festival | Top Ten Favorite Actor | Zhao Wei | Won |
| 20th Asian Television Awards | Best Actress | Zhao Wei | Nominated |
| 20th Asian Television Awards | Best Actor | Tong Dawei | Nominated |
| 22nd Shanghai Television Festival | Best Television Series | Tiger Mom | Nominated |
| 22nd Shanghai Television Festival | Best Director | Yao Xiaofeng | Nominated |
| 22nd Shanghai Television Festival | Best Writing | Shen Jie | Nominated |
| 22nd Shanghai Television Festival | Best Actress | Zhao Wei | Nominated |
| 22nd Shanghai Television Festival | Best Actor | Tong Dawei | Nominated |
| 22nd Shanghai Television Festival | Best Supporting Actress | Dong Jie | Nominated |
| 22nd Shanghai Television Festival | Best Supporting Actor | Han Tongsheng | Nominated |
| 6th Macau International Television Festival | Best Supporting Actress | Cui Xinqin | Won |
| 7th China TV Drama Awards | Best Supporting Actress | Dong Jie | Won |
| 2nd Hengdian Film and TV Festival of China | Best Television Series | Tiger Mom | Won |

== International broadcast ==
The series was picked up by Fox International Channels for global releases.

- China - Dragon Television & Tianjin Television — 3 May 2015
- Hong Kong - STAR Chinese Channel & TVB (dubbed in Cantonese)
- Singapore - VV Drama & Mediacorp Channel 8
- Malaysia - Unifi & NTV7 - 2015
- Taiwan – STAR Chinese Channel & TVBS-G — 31 August 2015
- United States – Dish Network — 2015
- Canada – Rogers TV — 2015
- Thailand – TPBS - 31 May 2018
- Vietnam – HTV7 - September 17, 2015
- Indonesia – MyTV - 1 February 2019 (before My News Prime program)
