= Jin Dong =

Chinese actor

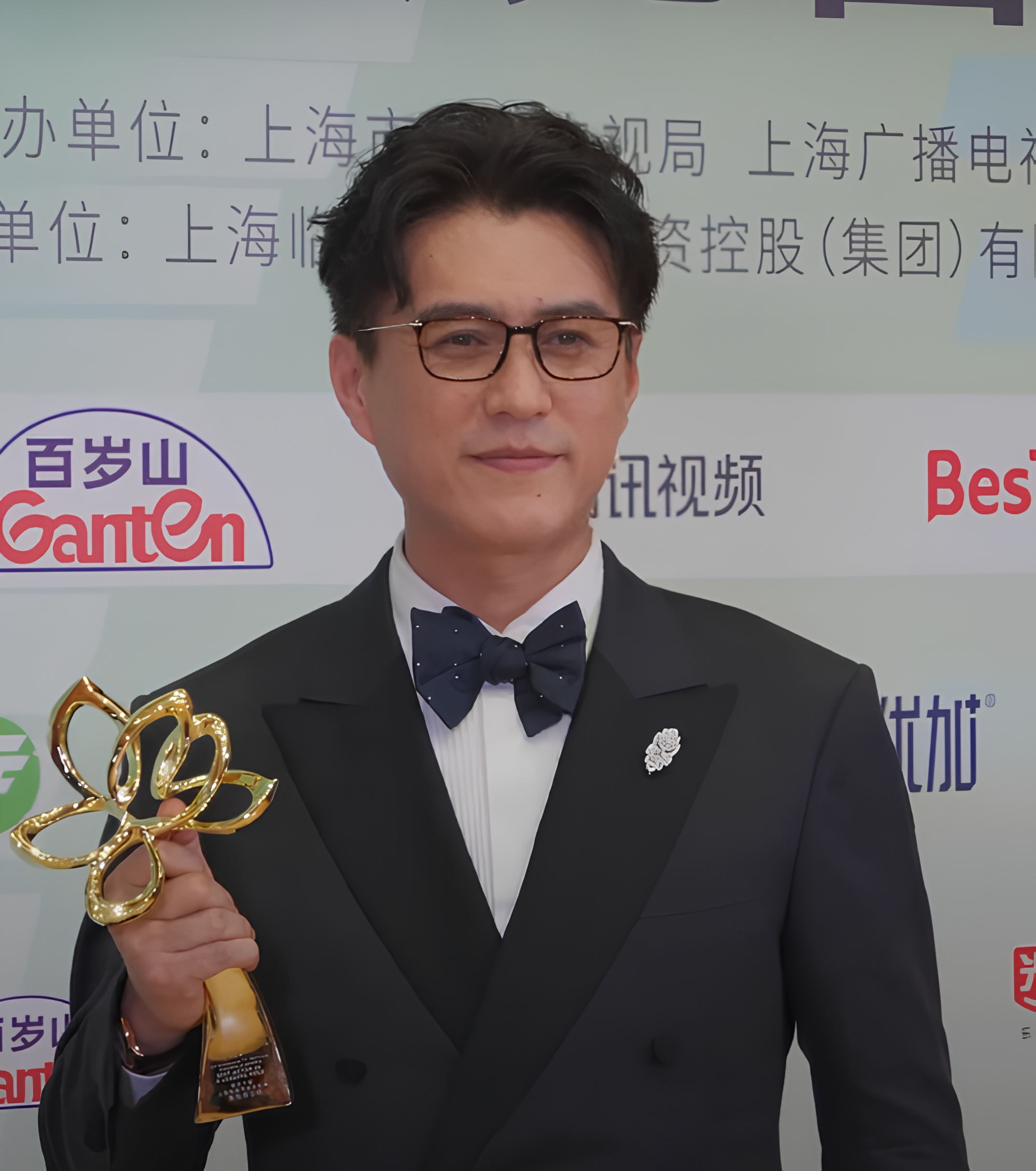
- Jin at the closing ceremony of the 30th Shanghai Television Festival on 27 June 2025
- Born: December 22, 1976 (age 49); Shandong, China
- Education: Central Academy of Drama
- Occupation: Actor
- Years active: 1993–present
- Agent: Daylight Entertainment Television Ltd.
- Spouse: Joane Li
- Children: 2

Chinese name
- Traditional Chinese: 靳東
- Simplified Chinese: 靳东
Transcriptions
Standard Mandarin
- Hanyu Pinyin: Jìn Dōng

Jin Dong (Chinese: 靳东, born 22 December 1976) is a Chinese actor. He is known for his television roles in Legend of Entrepreneurship (2012), The Disguiser (2015), Candle in the Tomb (2016), Surgeons (2017), and The First Half of My Life (2017).

== Career ==
When he was a teenager, Jin played a supporting role in television series Oriental Businessmen (1995). In 2003, he graduated from Central Drama Academy with a degree in performance.

Jin first gained critics' attention for his performance in the film Autumn Rain (2005), and was nominated for the Best Newcomer award at the Huabiao Awards. The film also won the Gold Award at the Yalta International Film Festival. He has also starred in numerous theater plays such as Sunrise (2008) and Jing Tian Lei (2010) where he played Mao Zedong. In 2012, Jin won the China Golden Lion Award for Drama, the highest honor awarded for theater play. Also in 2012, Jin won the Best Supporting Actor award at the Asia Rainbow TV Awards for his performance in Legend of Entrepreneurship.

Jin successfully broke into the mainstream with spy drama The Disguiser, which was a critical and commercial success. Jin reportedly gained 10 kg for his role as Ming Lou. He also made notable guest appearances in the highly popular historical drama Nirvana in Fire (2015) and the metropolitan romance series Ode to Joy (2016).

In 2016, Jin played Hu Bayi in web adaptation of popular tomb-raiding novel series Candle in the Tomb, produced by the same team behind Nirvana in Fire and The Disguiser. The series received positive acclaim for its performance.

In 2017, Jin starred alongside Bai Baihe in the medical drama Surgeons. He then starred in the romance drama The First Half of My Life, based on the novel of the same name by Yi Shu. The series was a ratings hit and became one of the most talked about dramas online. The same year, Jin became the vice president of China Television Artists Association. Jin ranked 50th on Forbes China Celebrity 100 list in 2017.

In 2018, Jin starred alongside Jiang Shuying in the romantic comedy series Mr. Right. The drama gained one of the highest viewership ratings of the year. The same year, he was cast in The People's Property, a political drama that is the sequel to the 2017 hit drama In the Name of People.

In 2019, Jin starred in the legal drama The Best Partner.

In 2020, Jiang starred in the healing romance drama If Time Flows Back. He ranked 63rd on Forbes China Celebrity 100 list.

== Filmography ==
=== Film ===
Year	English title	Chinese title	Role	Notes/Ref.
2005	Hunter	狩猎者	Lian Zhang	
2005	My Mother Zhao Yiman	我的母亲赵一曼	Policeman Dong	
2005	Autumn Rain	秋雨	He Ming	
2005	Female Interpol	女刑警之黑色魔方	Hua Zhanghu	
2011		玉树花开	Liu Kaiqiang	
2011	Vancouver Rock and Roll	温哥华酱油乐队	Fang Xiaohe	Guest appearance

=== Television series ===
Year	English title	Chinese title	Role	Notes/Ref.
1993	Oriental Businessmen	东方商人	Gao Xianyang	
1995	Mother	母亲	Zhang Hongbin	
2001		孙子	Bao Mei	
2001		五色场	Wei Shaokun	
2002		水果姑娘	Wang Rui	
2004		神医华佗	Liang Buyi	
2004	City of Sky	天空之城	Duan Peng	
2004	The Young Imperial Envoy	少年大钦差	Xu An	
2004	Women Prison	女子监狱	Cong Wenhui	
2006	A Mother and His Son of Sadness	悲情母子	Wu Yongnan	
2006	Silence	深情密码	Hu Hanxin	
2007		博士县长	Yang Bo	
2007	Who Is Lying	谁在说谎	Team Leader Liang	
2008		闯关东	Guitian Yilang	
2008		猎敌先锋	Li Tianbei	
2008	Dongfang Shuo	东方朔	Emperor Wu of Han	
2009		世纪末的晚钟	An Tian	
2009	Shanghai Adventure	风雨上海滩	Li Zijian	
2009	Special Competition	特殊争夺	Yue Zhensheng	
2010	Infernal Lover	无间有爱	Liu Yikui	
2012	Youth That Could Not Be Hurt	伤不起的青春	Ma Shaofeng	
2012	Little Heroes	自古英雄出少年	Chen Jinnan	Cameo
2012	Down the List Hey	秘杀名单	Zhou Enlai	
2012		情仇姐妹	Xu Shiping	
2012	Legend of Entrepreneurship	温州一家人	Huang Zhixiong	
2013	Arrows on the Bowstring	箭在弦上	Rong Shi	
2013	Baby	宝贝	Li Chuanqi	Guest appearance
2013	Athena	青春烈火	Chong Guangkui	Guest appearance
2013	Young Did Not Fall	青春不言败	Liu Huasheng	
2013	The Distance of Love	到爱的距离	Ling Yuan	
2014	Sniper Elite	狼烟遍地	Mu Liangfeng	
2014	Battle of Changsha	战长沙	Wang Kaifu	Guest appearance
2014	Rose in the Wind	妇道	Zhou Yongjia	
2015	Ferocious	来势凶猛	Du Jianfeng	
2015	The Disguiser	伪装者	Ming Lou	
2015	Nirvana in Fire	瑯琊榜	Lin Chen	Guest appearance
2016	Ode to Joy	欢乐颂	Tan Zongming	Guest appearance
2016		龙器	Qin Xuance	also producer
2016	Candle in the Tomb	鬼吹灯之精绝古城	Hu Bayi	Web series
2017	Surgeons	外科风云	Zhuang Shu	
2017	Ode to Joy 2	欢乐颂2	Tan Zongming	Guest appearance
2017	The First Half of My Life	我的前半生	He Han	also producer
2017	For My Love	我们的爱	Xu Guangming	
2017	Head Above Water	守卫者-浮出水面	Hong Shaoqiu	
2018	Mr. Right	恋爱先生	Cheng Hao	also producer
2019	The Best Partner	精英律师	Luo Bin	
2020	If Time Flows Back	如果岁月可回头	Bai Zhiyong	
2020	With You	在一起	Hu Qingsheng	
2021	People's Property	突围	Qi Ben'an	
2021	Faith Makes Great	理想照耀中国	Chen Wangdao	
2021	Going Rural	温暖的味道	Sun Guangming	
2022	Nice to Meet You Again	林深见鹿	Lin Shaotao	
2022	Draw the Line	底线	Fang Yuan	
2023	In Spite of the Strong Wind	纵有疾风起	Tang Chen	
2023	Infernal Affairs	无间	Lu Feng	
2023	Welcome to Milele	欢迎来到麦乐村	Ma Jia	
2024	Northwest Years	西北岁月	Xi Zhongxun	

== Awards and nominations ==
Year	Award	Category	Nominated work	Result	Ref.
2005	11th Huabiao Awards	Outstanding New Actor	Autumn Rain	Nominated	
2012	China Golden Lion Award		Jing Tian Lei	Won	
2014	2nd Asia Rainbow TV Awards	Best Supporting Actor	Legend of Entrepreneurship	Won	
2014	3rd Chinese Communist Youth League (CCYL)	May 4 Medal	—N/a	Won	
2015	"Wind From The East" Entertainment Influence Awards	Most Capable Actor	The Disguiser	Won	
2015	iQiyi All-Star Carnival	Most Capable Actor	The Disguiser	Won	
2015	7th China TV Drama Awards	Most Capable Actor	The Disguiser	Won	
2016	Weibo Awards Ceremony	Most Capable Actor	The Disguiser	Won	
2016	1st China Television Drama Quality Ceremony	Most Capable Actor	The Disguiser	Won	
2016	22nd Shanghai Television Festival	Best Actor	The Disguiser	Nominated	
2016	19th Huading Awards	Best Actor (Revolutionary-Era Drama)	The Disguiser	Won	
2017	2nd China Quality Television Drama Ceremony	Influence Television Actor	—N/a	Won	
2017	23rd Shanghai Television Festival	Best Supporting Actor	Ode to Joy	Nominated	
2017	Tencent Video Star Awards	Television Actor of the Year	Surgeons, The First Half of My Life	Won	
2017	iQiyi All-Star Carnival	Television Actor of the Year	The First Half of My Life	Won	
2017	8th Macau International Television Festival	Best Actor	The First Half of My Life	Nominated	
2017	4th The Actors of China Award Ceremony	Best Actor (Sapphire)	The First Half of My Life	Won	
2018	3rd China Television Drama Quality Ceremony	Outstanding Quality Star	The First Half of My Life	Won	
2018	Chinese American Film Festival	Best Actor	Mr. Right	Won	
2024	34th Flying Apsaras Awards	Outstanding Actor	Welcome to Milele	Nominated	
2024	32nd China TV Golden Eagle Awards	Best Actor	Welcome to Milele	Nominated	
2025	30th Shanghai Television Festival	Best Actor	Northwest Years	Won	
