= The Disguiser =

Chinese television series

- Promotional poster
- Also known as: The Pretender
- Genre: Spy; Action thriller War
- Created by: Zhang Yong
- Based on: The Spy War on Shanghai Bund
- Written by: Zhang Yong
- Directed by: Li Xue
- Starring: Hu Ge; Jin Dong; Liu Mintao; Wang Kai
- Theme music composer: Meng Ke
- Opening theme: Main 1 by Wang Shu Yi
- Ending theme: From the Heart by Duo Liang
- Composer: Wang Shuyi
- Country of origin: China
- Original language: Mandarin
- No. of episodes: 41

Production
- Executive producer: Hou Hongliang
- Production locations: Shanghai; Hengdian World Studios; Jiaxing
- Camera setup: Multiple-camera setup
- Running time: 45 minutes
- Production companies: Shandong Film & TV Production Co., Ltd. Daylight Entertainment Ltd.

Original release
- Network: Hunan Broadcasting System (Hunan TV)
- Release: 31 August – 28 September 2015

The Disguiser (Chinese: 伪装者; pinyin: Wěi Zhuāng Zhě) is a 2015 Chinese spy war television drama based on Zhang Yong's novel, Spy War on Shanghai Bund (諜戰上海灘). It was produced by Hou Hongliang and directed by Li Xue, and stars Hu Ge, Jin Dong, Liu Mintao and Wang Kai as the members of the Ming family. The series tells the story Ming Tai, a rich and naïve young master of the Ming household, who is trained to become a spy for the Kuomintang to fight Wang Jingwei’s leadership of Japan's puppet regime in China. It originally aired daily on Hunan Television from 31 August to 28 September 2015.

The series was met with critical acclaim, topping Sohu TV ratings, and was nominated for "Outstanding Drama" at the 30th Flying Apsaras Awards. episode:41

== Synopsis ==
The plot centers around the Ming household during the Japanese occupation era: college student Ming Tai is kidnapped by Nationalist government leader Wang Tianfeng, who gives him spy training and a life-and-death partner Yu Manli to carry out the party's many missions. The oldest brother, Ming Lou is the patriarch of the Ming household, while also holding many important positions and connections in the Nationalist government, Chinese Communist Party, the Reorganized Government, and the Japanese government, although not many know his true intentions and loyalties. Ming Cheng acts as the Ming Lou's trusted assistant, making him the number one target for others to get to Ming Lou. Through the many dangerous predicaments the family face, together, they fight to bring down their enemies and end the occupation.

== Cast ==
Ming household

- Hu Ge as Ming Tai, a spoiled and naive young man and the youngest brother of the family. His birth mother died saving Ming Lou and Ming Jing from an assassination attempt, leaving him orphaned. The siblings later took him in as an adopted member of the family. Ming Tai is gifted in his skills as a spy but still retains an immature personality. His code name is "Scorpion".
- Jin Dong as Ming Lou, the oldest brother. On the surface he is an official in the collaborationist government, but his true loyalties are a mystery. Highly skilled in the ways of espionage, his code name is "Viper".
- Liu Mintao as Ming Jing, the sister who acts as the mother of the whole family unit. She is the chairman of the Ming Corporation and secretly funds the Chinese Communist Party. She tries to keep Ming Tai away from politics for his safety by sending him away for an education.
- Wang Kai as Ming Cheng (Ah-Cheng), the middle brother who is the assistant of Ming Lou. He was adopted by the Ming housekeeper Auntie Gui. After seeing how abusive she was toward the boy, the Ming siblings decided to take Ah-Cheng into their family.
- Guo Hong as Auntie Gui, Ming Cheng's adopted mother who was dismissed for her abusive behavior toward him. She later reappeared and became a spy for Wang Man Chun, collecting intelligence from the Ming family.
- Zhu Mengyao as Ah-Xiang, the family maid.
- Feng Hui as Ming Tang, Ming's cousin and a wealthy business owner.

Nationalist government

- Liu Yijun as Wang Tianfeng, the leader of the Nationalist government's military training program who recognized Ming Tai's abilities and kidnapped him. He trained Ming Tai to become a spy and made him the leader of his team. His code name is "Wasp".
- Song Yi as Yu Manli, Ming Tai's life-and-death partner. She was sold to a brothel by her father but was saved by Boss Yu, who sent her to school. However, he was robbed and killed. She later took revenge by murdering the criminals, and while waiting for her death sentence, was discovered and recruited by Wang Tianfeng.
- Wang Zheng as Guo Qiyun
- Wang Hong as Adviser Lin

Chinese Communist Party

- Wang Lejun as Cheng Jinyun, a medical student who works as a spy for the Communist party. She is a frequent partner during Ming Tai's missions. The two eventually fall in love and marry.
- Guo Xiaofeng as Uncle Li, Ming Tai's long lost father.
- Zhang Yanyan as Dr. Su
- Sun Chen as Dong Yan
- Gao Xin as Zhang Yueyin

Department 76

- Wang Ou as Wang Manchun, Ming Lou's lover and director of the intelligence department of Department 76. She is of the Wang family, who are sworn enemies of the Mings, although she still cares for Ming Lou deeply.
- Yue Yang as Liang Zhongchun, Director of Operations at Department 76. He is often competing with Wang Manchun for the head of Department 76.
- Sun Mengjia as Zhu Huiyin
- Liu Lu as Secretary Liu
- Gao Zheng as Secretary Li
- Qu Haotian as Secretary Chen
- Feng Qian as Wang Fuqu, Wang Manchun's uncle who raised her. He was responsible for the death of Ming Tai's mother.

Japanese government

- Matsumine Lilie as Lieutenant Colonel Yōko Minamida (Japanese: 藤田義正, Hepburn: Rikugun-Chūsa Minamida Yōko), a high-ranking official in the Imperial Japanese Army, a high-ranking member of the Japanese government in Shanghai and one of the main antagonists of The Disguiser.
- Hirata Yasuyuki as Yoshimasa Fujita (Japanese: 陸軍中佐南田陽子, Hepburn: Fujita Yoshimasa).
- Matsuura Noriyuki as Takagi
- Guo Tongtong as Momoko-san

== Production ==
The Disguiser was adapted from Zhang Yong's novel, The Spy War on Shanghai Bund. The script was inspired by the novel's characters who have multiple identities, with many skills to transform and camouflage in a variety of scenarios; and hence the television series' title. The creative team included author Zhang Yong as the screenwriter, Magnolia award-winning director Li Xue, Hou Hongliang as head producer as well as Meng Ke and Wang Shuyi as the main composer of the soundtrack. Other members of the production team include casting and dubbing directors Bi Yingjie, Jiang Guangyao and Zhang Kai, artistic director Shao Changyong, action stunt director Hao Wanjun, costume designer Ru Meiqi and set designer Su Zhiyong.

Location filming began on January 4, and ended on April 27, 2015, where it entered post-production.

== Soundtrack ==
The Disguiser Original Soundtrack (OST)

Soundtrack album by Meng Ke/Wang Shuyi
- Released: September 22, 2015
- Genre: Instrumental
- Language: Mandarin
- Label: Shangdong Television
- Producer: Meng Ke

Tracks 1 through 20 were composed by Meng Ke, while tracks 21 through 24 were composed by Wang Shuyi, who also composed the theme song, "From the Heart (诉衷情)".

No.	Title	Length
1.	"Brotherhood Theme (兄弟情主题)"	2:57
2.	"Tragedy (悲壮)"	2:08
3.	"Fight (打斗 厮杀)"	1:05
4.	"Humor (幽默 诙谐)"	0:54
5.	"Tense Evacuation (紧张 撤离)"	3:04
6.	"Confrontation (对峙)"	3:04
7.	"Quickness (急促)"	2:26
8.	"Training (训练)"	1:22
9.	"Partner (搭档)"	1:54
10.	"Tragic Execution Grounds (悲惨 刑场)"	2:33
11.	"Father and son (父与子)"	2:06
12.	"Soft Sadness - female voice (柔软悲情 女声)"	1:34
13.	"Solemn Memories (肃穆回忆)"	2:37
14.	"Main Emotions (主题情感)"	1:45
15.	"Emotions 1 (情感 1)"	2:09
16.	"Emotions 2 (情感 2)"	2:33
17.	"Emotions 3 (情感 3)"	2:06
18.	"Emotions 4 (情感 4)"	2:50
19.	"Warm Dialogue (对话 温暖)"	2:02
20.	"Love (爱意)"	1:02
21.	"Sweet Happiness (甜蜜幸福)"	2:41
22.	"Main 1 (主题 1)"	1:13
23.	"Main 2 (主题 2)"	1:14
24.	"Ideas (悠扬)"	0:51
25.	"From the Heart (诉衷情)" (performed by Duo Liang)	3:05
26.	"From the Heart (诉衷情) Interlude ver." (Duo Liang)	3:13

== Ratings ==
China Hunan TV/ Online premiere ratings
Episodes	Broadcast date	Hunan TV (CSM50)			Online ratings		
Episodes	Broadcast date	Ratings (%)	Audience share (%)	Rankings	Ratings (%)	Audience share (%)	Rankings
1-2	August 31, 2015	1.306	3.704	1	1.89	5.74	1
3-4	September 1, 2015	1.261	3.696	1	1.96	6.06	1
5-6	September 2, 2015	1.414	4.521	1	1.72	6.27	1
-	September 3, 2015	CCTV 70th anniversary of Sino-Japanese War Memorial Gala broadcast					
7-8	September 4, 2015	1.912	5.480	1	2.30	7.06	1
9-10	September 5, 2015	2.078	5.932	1	2.35	7.30	1
11	September 6, 2015	0.950	2.799	2	1.22	3.83	1
12-13	September 7, 2015	1.843	5.396	1	2.31	7.21	1
14-15	September 8, 2015	1.723	4.955	1	2.23	6.92	1
16-17	September 9, 2015	2.029	5.95	1	2.56	8.00	1
18-19	September 10, 2015	2.262	6.58	1	2.91	8.89	1
20	September 11, 2015	1.276	3.682	1	1.83	5.28	1
21	September 12, 2015	1.440	4.201	1	1.82	5.40	1
22-23	September 13, 2015	1.936	5.503	1	2.34	7.13	1
24-25	September 14, 2015	2.128	6.231	1	2.39	7.43	1
26-27	September 15, 2015	2.150	6.213	1	2.40	7.46	1
28-29	September 16, 2015	2.137	6.28	1	2.26	7.18	1
30-31	September 17, 2015	2.269	6.72	1	2.34	7.47	1
32-33	September 18, 2015	2.357	6.581	1	2.52	7.46	1
34	September 19, 2015	1.416	4.262	1	1.53	4.57	1
35	September 20, 2015	1.658	4.792	1	1.76	5.13	1
36-37	September 21, 2015	2.098	6.205	1	2.21	6.91	1
38-39	September 22, 2015	2.290	6.309	1	2.46	7.77	1
40-41	September 23, 2015	2.474	7.335	1	2.46	7.93	1
42-43	September 24, 2015	2.356	6.854	1	2.46	7.75	1
44	September 25, 2015	1.297	3.934	1	1.47	4.39	1
45	September 26, 2015	1.955	5.658	1	2.35	6.59	1
46	September 27, 2015	1.789	5.169	1	2.08	5.97	1
47-48	September 28, 2015	2.724	7.801	1	3.02	9.10	1
Average ratings		1.93	5.6	1	2.26	7.01	1

- Highest ratings are marked in red, lowest ratings are marked in blue

== International broadcast ==
Network Channel	Location	Broadcast start date	Note
Hunan TV	Mainland China	August 31, 2015	Two episodes Sunday to Thursday 20:00, Friday and Saturday 19:30
Jinan TV	Mainland China	November 20, 2015	Daily 19:30
Shanghai TV	Mainland China	December 16, 2015	Daily 19:45
Zaozhuang TV	Mainland China	December 25, 2015	Daily 19:45
Guizhou TV	Mainland China	January 16, 2016	Two episodes Saturday to Thursday 19:30, Friday 19:30
Fujian TV	Mainland China	TBA	Daily 20:10
Chinese TV	South Korea	March 1, 2016	Monday through Friday 23:00-00:00
MCOT Family Number 14 (เอ็มคอตแฟมิลี่ หมาเลข 14)	Thailand	January 15, 2018 - June 26, 2018	Every Monday 20:15-21.15. and Tuesday 20:00-21.00.
Sony ONE	Singapore; Malaysia; Indonesia; Cambodia; Thailand	January 19, 2019	Sat and Sun 19:15(SIN); 18:15(JKT/BKK)

== Awards and nominations ==
Award	Category	Nominee	Result	ref.
2nd Hengdian Film and TV Festival of China	Best Screenplay	The Disguiser	Won	
2nd Hengdian Film and TV Festival of China	Best Actor	Hu Ge	Won	
2016 iQiyi All-Star Carnival	TV Actor of the Year	Hu Ge (also for Nirvana in Fire and Good Times)	Won	
2016 iQiyi All-Star Carnival	Most Powerful Actor	Jin Dong	Won	
2016 iQiyi All-Star Carnival	TV Drama Producer of the Year	Hou Hongliang (also for Nirvana in Fire)	Won	
30th Flying Apsaras Awards	Outstanding Actor	Hu Ge	Nominated	
30th Flying Apsaras Awards	Outstanding Drama	The Disguiser	Nominated	
7th China TV Drama Awards	Top Ten Television Series	The Disguiser	Won	
7th China TV Drama Awards	Industry Contribution Award	Hou Hongliang (also for Nirvana in Fire)	Won	
1st China Quality Television Drama Ceremony	Quality Award	The Disguiser	Won	
1st China Quality Television Drama Ceremony	Quality Performance Grand Award	Hu Ge (also for Nirvana in Fire and Good Times)	Won	
1st China Quality Television Drama Ceremony	Best Director	Li Xue (also for Nirvana in Fire)	Won	
1st China Quality Television Drama Ceremony	Best Producer	Hou Hongliang (also for Nirvana in Fire)	Won	
1st China Quality Television Drama Ceremony	Most Powerful Actor	Jin Dong	Won	
1st China Quality Television Drama Ceremony	Most Marketable Actor	Hu Ge (also for Nirvana in Fire and Good Times)	Won	
1st China Quality Television Drama Ceremony	Most Popular Actor	Wang Kai (also for Nirvana in Fire)	Won	
19th Huading Awards	Best Director	Li Xue	Nominated	
19th Huading Awards	Best Screenwriter	Zhang Yong	Nominated	
19th Huading Awards	Best Actor	Wang Kai	Nominated	
19th Huading Awards	Best Actor (Revolution-Era)	Jin Dong	Won	
19th Huading Awards	Best Actress (Revolution-Era)	Liu Mintao	Nominated	
19th Huading Awards	Best Supporting Actress	Angel Wang	Won	
19th Huading Awards	Best Producer	Hou Hongliang	Nominated	
19th Huading Awards	Top 10 Dramas	The Disguiser	Won	
3rd Asia Rainbow TV Awards	Best Action Drama	The Disguiser	Won	
3rd Asia Rainbow TV Awards	Best Leading Actress (Modern)	Liu Mintao	Won	
11th National Top-Notch Television Production Award Ceremony	Outstanding Television Series	The Disguiser	Won	
