= A Better Tomorrow (disambiguation) =

A Better Tomorrow is a 1986 action film by John Woo.

A Better Tomorrow may also refer to:

- A Better Tomorrow II, the 1987 sequel
- A Better Tomorrow III: Love & Death in Saigon, a 1989 film based on the previous films
- A Better Tomorrow (2010 film), a remake by Song Hae-sung
- A Better Tomorrow 2018, a remake by Ding Sheng
- A Better Tomorrow (album), 2014 album by Wu-Tang Clan
- A Better Tomorrow (EP), 2021 extended play by Drippin
- A Better Tomorrow, a brand used by the British American Tobacco for their sponsorship with McLaren Formula One team
