= Wang Kai (actor) =

Chinese actor (born 1982)

- 王凯
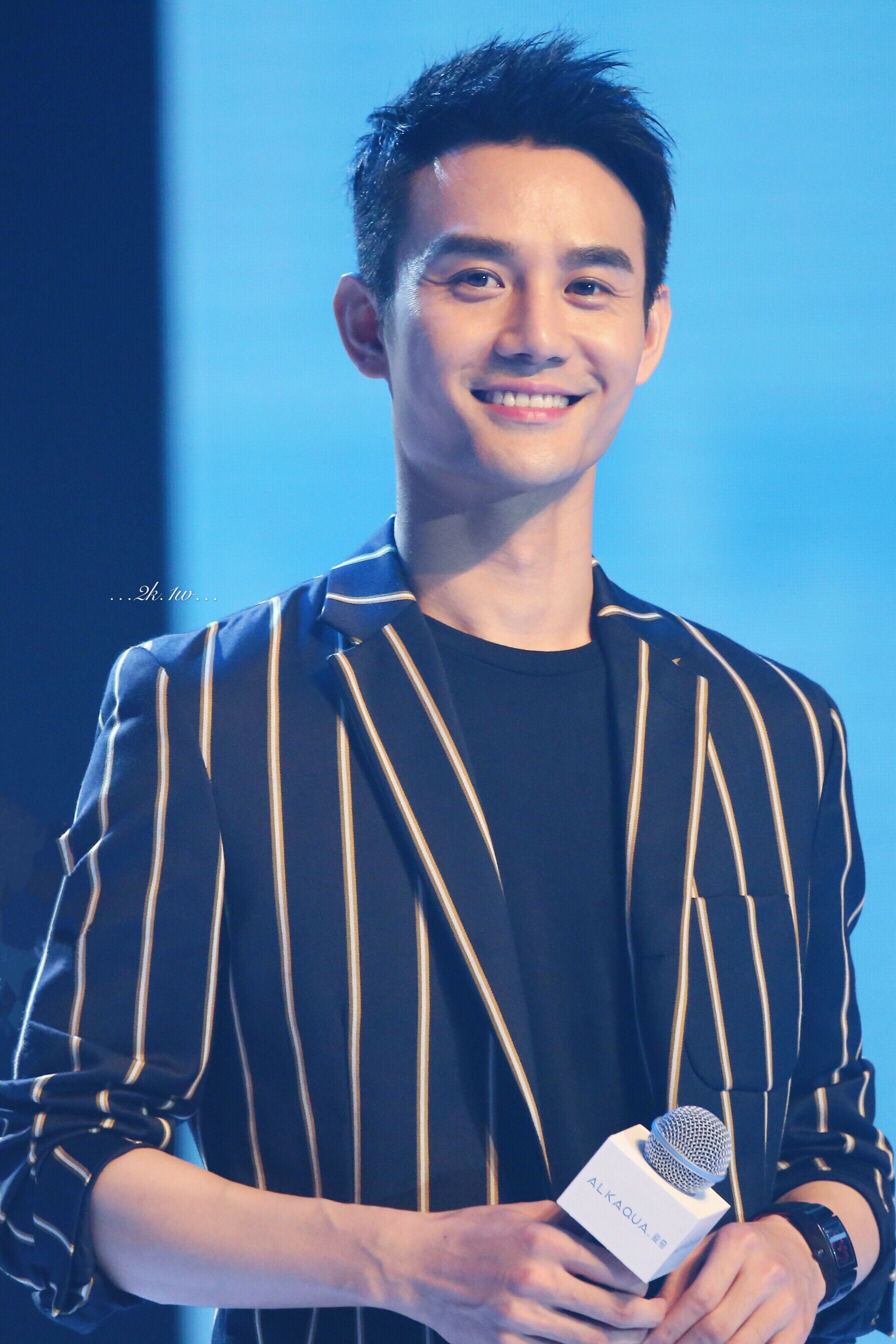
- Wang in 2017
- Born: August 18, 1982 (age 44); Wuhan, China
- Education: Central Academy of Drama
- Occupation: Actor
- Years active: 2006–present
- Musical career
- Also known as: Nick Wang
- Labels: Deshe Film and Television Co., Ltd.

Chinese name
- Simplified Chinese: 王凯
- Traditional Chinese: 王凱
Transcriptions
Standard Mandarin
- Hanyu Pinyin: Wáng Kǎi

Wang Kai (born August 18, 1982) is a Chinese actor. He is known for his television roles in All Quiet in Peking (2014), The Disguiser (2015), Nirvana in Fire (2015), Ode to Joy (2016), When a Snail Falls in Love (2016), Stay with Me (2016), Like a Flowing River (2018–2024), and Flight to You (2022), as well as his film role in The Devotion of Suspect X.

== Early life and education ==
Wang was born in Wuhan in Hubei Province. Although he wanted to become an actor after performing Thunderstorm in school, his father wanted him to do sports while his mother wanted him to find a stable job. As a result, he worked as a book porter at Xinhua Bookstore after high school. During his free time, he took on side jobs such as attending activities organized by TV stations, taking model-training courses, and shooting commercials. In 2002, during the shooting of a commercial, the director suggested Wang attend an acting academy. Wang resigned from his job and moved to Shanghai to take courses on acting at the Shanghai Theatre Academy in 2002. The next year, he applied for the Beijing Film Academy and the Central Academy of Drama. Wang received offers from both academies, and chose to attend the latter.

== Career ==
=== Beginnings ===
While a student at the Central Academy of Drama, Wang received his first acting role in Cold Autumn (2006), upon recommendation of his professor Zhang Xiaolong (张晓龙). In 2006, he participated in his first film Miao gou renxin (妙狗人心, 2007), an animal movie which focuses on dogs.

In 2007, Wang graduated from the Central Academy of Drama and signed with Huayi Brothers. During his first year with Huayi, he received no roles except for a minor role in Water Point Peach Blossom by Ma Lujian, the director of Cold Autumn. He also had a minor role in the romantic comedy drama Calling For Love. As the series would be aired in Taiwan, he learned to speak with a Taiwanese accent for the role.

=== 2008–13: Rising popularity ===
Wang's first breakthrough in the industry was his casting in Ugly Wudi, adapted from the American comedy series Ugly Betty. The TV series was a commercial success, with all four seasons being the highest viewed in its time slot. Although he tried out for the male lead, he was instead offered the role of Chen Jiaming, a sassy advertising director. Wang continued to play the role for all four seasons of the series' run between 2008 and 2010. While filming Ugly Wudi, he left Huayi Brothers and signed with the series' production company, Nesound International.

After the success of Ugly Wudi, Wang found himself offered roles similar to his role in the series. Unwilling to be typecast, he rejected them all. Finally, he was offered the role of the a rugged and uneducated youth in Youth (2012). He then starred in New Detective Squad (2013), a Republican-era detective series loosely based on The Three Heroes and Five Gallants. The series had high viewership in mainland China and developed a small cult following online.

=== 2014–2015: Breakthrough ===
In 2013, with the disbandment of Nesound's management department, Wang joined Shandong Television & Film. His first role under the company was a police officer in the critically acclaimed historical drama All Quiet in Peking, which was released in 2014. This marked a turning point in his career. Wang was praised for his ability to hold his own ground against multiple acclaimed veteran actors. The same year, he starred in the historical film, A Murder Beside Yanhe River, where he plays a Chinese Workers' and Peasants' Red Army officer who becomes a murder suspect. The film premiered in December 2014, and Wang received his first acting award, the Best New Actor Award at the 9th Chinese Youth Film Forum for his performance in the film.

In December 2014, when producer Hou Hongliang resigned from Shandong Film & Television to focus on Daylight Entertainment Ltd., Wang left with him for Daylight Entertainment. He then starred in three television series produced by Daylight Entertainment: Nirvana in Fire, The Disguiser, and Love Me If You Dare. Wang played a loyal and capable triple agent in The Disguiser, the neglected prince Xiao Jingyan who climbs his way to the throne with the help of his best friend in Nirvana in Fire and the protagonist's best friend in Love Me If You Dare.

Following the airing of these dramas, Wang experienced a sharp rise in popularity. He was nominated for the Best Actor award at the Huading Awards and Shanghai Television Festival for his performance in The Disguiser and Nirvana in Fire respectively, and won the Best Supporting Actor award at the Asia Rainbow TV Awards. Wang had become a regular in both magazines and fashion events, and also received several endorsement deals.

=== 2016–present: Mainstream success ===
In 2016, he featured in metropolitan romance drama Ode to Joy. Although he did not appear until episode 11, Wang in association with the show was one of the most discussed topics on social media. He reunited with his Ode to Joy co-star Wang Ziwen in crime thriller When a Snail Falls in Love, adapted from Ding Mo's novel of the same name. The same year, Wang starred alongside Joe Chen in romance drama Stay with Me and in Jackie Chan's action comedy film Railroad Tigers.

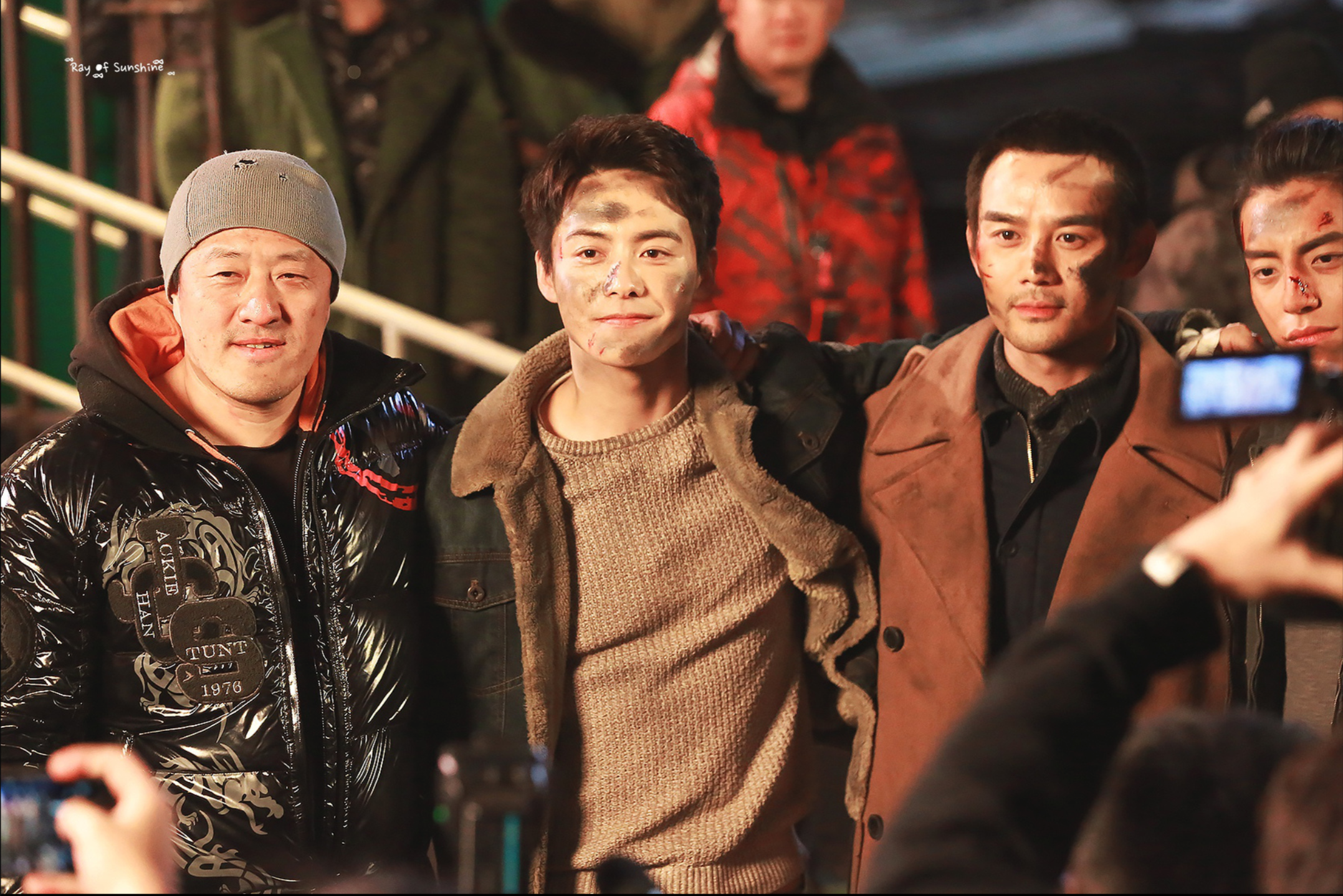
Wang on the film set of A Better Tomorrow with Ma Tianyu and Wang Talu

In 2017, Wang starred in mystery-thriller The Devotion of Suspect X, adapted from the Japanese novel of the same name. The film was a box office success. The same year, he was announced to be playing Cao Cao in the upcoming film adaptation of popular RPG game Dynasty Warriors.

In 2018, Wang starred in A Better Tomorrow 2018, directed by Ding Sheng and a remake of the original classic. He returned to the small screen with the period drama Like a Flowing River, based on the novel Da Jiang Da He written by A Nai and set during the reform and opening up in 1978. The drama was a critical and commercial success, receiving positive reviews and topping ratings in its time slot. Wang received acclaim for his portrayal of a talented young man who fought against all odds to eventually becomes a technical engineer. He was nominated for the Magnolia Award for Best Actor in a Television Series. In addition to being an actor, he also made a music debut, in the form of his crossover album World of One, which sold well. One of the songs in the album, "Loneliness for One", is speculated to be a reflection of his early state of mind when he made his acting debut.

In 2020, Wang starred in historical drama Held in the Lonely Castle, portraying Emperor Renzong of Song. The same year, he starred in the crime thriller drama Hunting as a police officer. He guest starred as Secretary Pan in 2021's Minning Town.

== Other activities ==
=== Business venture ===
In February 2016, Wang co-founded Deshe Entertainment (Tianjin) Ltd. The company's co-investor is Daylight Entertainment, and its legal representative is Hou Hongliang.

=== Philanthropy ===
Wang was part of Han Hong's charity campaign to provide medical assistance in Gansu. He was made ambassador of "1219 Long Love" public event in Beijing, Estée Lauder Companies' Greater China's Breast Cancer Awareness Pink ribbon program and appointed the Traffic Safety Ambassador for Beijing.

== Filmography ==
=== Film ===
Year	English title	Chinese title	Role	Ref.
2007	Miao gou renxin	妙狗人心	A-wei	
2012	My Puppy My Love	我的狗狗我的爱	Shi Luwei	
2013	A Young Girl's Destiny	逆袭	Hao Chen	
2014	The Golden Era	黄金时代	Jin Yi	
2014	A Murder Beside Yanhe River	黄克功案件	Huang Kegong	
2016	Railroad Tigers	铁道飞虎	Fan Chuan	
2017	The Devotion of Suspect X	嫌疑人X的献身	Tang Chuan	
2018	A Better Tomorrow 2018	英雄本色2018	Zhou Kai	
2021	Dynasty Warriors	真三国无双	Cao Cao	

=== Television series ===
Year	English title	Chinese title	Role	Notes	Ref.
2006	Cold Autumn	寒秋	Huang Yuanshang		
2008	Water Point Peach Blossom	围屋里的桃花	Xu Yilin		
2008	Ugly Wudi	丑女无敌	Chen Jiaming		
2010	Calling For Love	呼叫大明星	Wang Rui		
2011	Guns Hou	枪炮侯	Dai Dao		
2011	Half the Sky	女人的天空	Wu Dawei (Note: Aired in 2016)		
2012	Youth	知青	Qi Yong		
2013	New Detective Alliance	新神探联盟之包大人来了	Gongsun Ze		
2014	All Quiet in Peking	北平无战事	Fang Mengwei		
2015	Waiting For You	等你爱我	Qu He		
2015	Once Upon a Time in Tsingtao	青岛往事	Liu Chengzhi		
2015	The Disguiser	伪装者	Ming Cheng		
2015	Nirvana in Fire	瑯琊榜	Xiao Jingyan, Prince Jing		
2015	Love Me If You Dare	他来了，请闭眼	Li Xunran		
2016	Legend of Nine Tails Fox	青丘狐传说	Shi Taipu		
2016	Ode to Joy	欢乐颂	Zhao Qiping	Season 1–2	
2016	When a Snail Falls in Love	如果蜗牛有爱情	Ji Bai		
2016	Stay with Me	放弃我，抓紧我	Chen Yidu		
2018–2024	Like a Flowing River	大江大河	Song Yunhui	Season 1–3	
2020	Serenade of Peaceful Joy	清平乐	Zhao Zhen		
2020	Hunting	猎狐	Xia Yuan		
2021	Minning Town	山海情	Secretary Pan (guest role)		
2022	Flight to You	向风而行	Gu Nanting		

=== Variety show ===
Year	English title	Chinese title	Role	Notes	Ref.
2014	Crazy Star Travel	疯狂星旅行	Cast member		
2016	Crossover Singer, Season 1	跨界歌王	Contestant		
2016	Fighting Man	我们战斗吧	Cast member		
2018	Crossover Singer, Season 3	跨界歌王	Contestant		
2019	Youth Travel	青春环游记	Cast member		

== Discography ==
=== Albums ===
Year	English title	Chinese title	Notes
2018	World of One	画外音	

=== Singles ===
Year	English title	Chinese title	Album	Notes
2013	"Exploration of the World"	探世界	New Detective Squad OST	
2015	"Loyal Blood Forever Runs Red"	赤血长殷	Nirvana in Fire OST	
2016	"Big Brother"	大哥	Railroad Tigers OST	with Darren Wang, Wu Yonglun & Sang Ping
2016	"Playing My Beloved Folk Lute"	弹起我心爱的土琵琶	Railroad Tigers OST	with Darren Wang, Wu Yonglun & Sang Ping
2017	"At This Moment"	在此刻		Performance for CCTV New Year's Gala
2018	"My Spring Gala My Year"	我的春晚我的年		Performance for CCTV New Year's Gala
2018	"Like a Flowing River"	大江大河	Like a Flowing River OST	

== Awards and nominations ==
Year	Award	Category	Nominated work	Result	Ref.
Major awards
2014	9th Chinese Young Generation Film Forum Awards	Best New Actor	A Murder Beside Yanhe River	Won	
2016	28th Golden Eagle Awards	Best Actor	All Quiet in Peking	Nominated	
2016	11th China Golden Eagle TV Arts Festival	Most Popular Actor	All Quiet in Peking	Nominated	
2016	19th Huading Awards	Best Actor	The Disguiser	Nominated	
2016	22nd Shanghai Television Festival	Best Supporting Actor	Nirvana in Fire	Nominated	
2016	3rd Asia Rainbow TV Awards	Best Supporting Actor	Nirvana in Fire	Won	
2019	25th Shanghai Television Festival	Best Actor	Like a Flowing River	Nominated	
2019	6th The Actors of China Awards	Best Actor (Sapphire Category)	Like a Flowing River	Won	
2020	30th China TV Golden Eagle Award	Best Actor	Like a Flowing River	Nominated	
2021	27th Shanghai Television Festival	Best Actor	Like a Flowing River 2	Nominated	
2022	13th Macau International Television Festival	Best Actor	Like a Flowing River 2	Won	
Other awards
2015	Cosmo Beauty Ceremony	Beautiful Idol Award	—N/a	Won	
2015	"Wind From The East" Entertainment Influence Awards	Most Popular Television Actor	—N/a	Won	
2015	15th China Pioneers List	Artist of the Year	—N/a	Won	
2015	Tencent White Paper	Television Star of the Year	—N/a	Won	
2015	Sohu Fashion Awards	Most Charismatic Man	—N/a	Won	
2015	7th China TV Drama Awards	Rising Actor Award	—N/a	Won	
2015	7th China TV Drama Awards	Most Popular Actor (Mainland China)	Nirvana in Fire	Won	
2016	Weibo Awards Ceremony	Person of the Year	—N/a	Won	
2016	1st China Television Drama Quality Ceremony	Most Popular Actor	—N/a	Won	
2016	Vision Youth Awards	Most Popular Actor	—N/a	Won	
2016	L'Officiel Fashion Night	Most Charismatic Actor	—N/a	Won	
2016	Cosmo Beauty Ceremony	Most Influential Idol	—N/a	Won	
2016	Baidu Awards	Person of the Year	—N/a	Won	
2016	10th Tencent Video Star Awards	Best Television Actor	When a Snail Falls in Love	Won	
2017	Jinri Toutiao "Super Star" Award Ceremony	Most Promising Actor	—N/a	Won	
2017	Weibo Awards Ceremony	Most Beautiful Performance	—N/a	Won	
2017	2nd China Television Drama Quality Ceremony	Most Marketable Actor	When a Snail Falls in Love, Stay with Me	Won	
2017	Weibo Movie Awards Ceremony	Influential Actor of the Year	The Devotion of Suspect X	Won	
2017	BAZAAR Men of the Year Award Ceremony	Most Attractive Celebrity	—N/a	Won	
2017	Jinri Toutiao Award Ceremony	Talented Actor of the Year	—N/a	Won	
2017	Cosmo Beauty Ceremony	Beautiful Person of the Year	—N/a	Won	
2018	Weibo Awards Ceremony	Male God Award	—N/a	Won	
2018	3rd China Television Drama Quality Ceremony	Best Anticipated Actor by the Media	—N/a	Won	
2018	L'Officiel Fashion Night	Generation Creativity Award	—N/a	Won	
2018	12th Tencent Video Star Awards	Television Actor of the Year	—N/a	Won	
2019	4th China Quality Television Drama Ceremony	Quality Star of the Year	—N/a	Won	
2019	Golden Bud - The Fourth Network Film And Television Festival	Best Actor	Like a Flowing River	Nominated	
2020	China Literature Awards Ceremony	Heartthrob Actor	—N/a	Won	

=== Forbes China Celebrity 100 ===
Year	Rank	Ref.
2017	42nd	
2019	46th	
2020	26th	
