= Immortal Samsara =

- Promotional poster
- Also known as: Agarwood Like Crumbs
- Chinese: 沉香如屑·沉香重华
- Genre: Xianxia; Fantasy; Romance
- Based on: Agarwood Like Crumbs by Su Mo
- Written by: Su Mo
- Directed by: Guo Hu; Ren Haitao
- Starring: Yang Zi; Cheng Yi; Zhang Rui; Meng Ziyi; Li Xinze
- Opening theme: Hong Chen Lu by Jason Zhang
- Ending theme: Agarwood by Jane Zhang & Jason Zhang
- Country of origin: China
- Original language: Mandarin
- No. of seasons: 1
- No. of episodes: 38 (part 1); 21 (part 2); 2 (Special)

Production
- Production locations: Xinjiang, China; Hengdian World Studios
- Running time: 45 mins
- Production companies: H&R Century Pictures

Original release
- Network: Youku
- Release: 20 July – 7 September 2022

Immortal Samsara (Chinese: 沉香如屑·沉香重华; pinyin: Chen Xiang Ru Xie·Chen Xiang Zhong Hua) is a 2022 Chinese Xianxia television series based on the novel Agarwood Like Crumbs by Su Mo. It stars Yang Zi as Yan Dan and Cheng Yi as Ying Yuan. The 1st part premiered on Youku on July 20 and ended its run on August 17.

The 2nd part aired from August 18 to September 2. Youku released 2 special episodes on September 7. The series ranked as the top streaming series with 2.4 million online reservations pre-air and 18.99% of market share after release according to Lighthouse Data.

== Plot ==
Yan-Dan is, originally, one of the twins of a rare four-leaf hanli twin lotus blossom, a relic of the ancients. Her body has been a treasure of medicinal cures since ancient times. She and her twin sister Zhi-Xi transformed into human form during the Jade Pool festival of the Supreme Emperor. The Demon clan tried to kidnap the lotus twins for their Emperor, to increase his Immortal powers. They are stopped by Lord Ying-Yuan who then gives the lotus twins their names. The twin lotus sisters had very different lifestyles. Zhi-Xi is always trying to better herself and elevate her status. Yan-Dan is not interested in cultivation or raising her status. She leaves it up to her sister to do it. She just wanted to write plays, relax, and enjoy a care-free life.

Zhi-Xi became assistant Curator at the Palace of Magical Pavilion and was despised by Curator Ying-Deng who made her life difficult. Yan-Dan was originally assigned to the Pavilion of Books, where she was writing a play about the War of Genesis Heroes, a war against Demons won by the collaboration of many mystical magical tribes. Many fought bravely and died during the war. One, in particular, had been forgotten and who contributed greatly to the war effort, the Nine Fin Tribe. Nine Fins descendant Yu Mo-Shan, from ancient times, was saved by Celestial Deity Bei-Ming who helped him attain human form through cultivation. He became friends with Yan-Dan and helped her with her play. While writing the play, Yan-Dan noticed someone kept flipping the Divine turtle onto his back and was determined to find out who was the culprit. She was unsuccessful, even though she tried many times and set many traps.

Yan-Dan helped Celestial Deity Bei-Ming, who was always kind to her, solve many chess problems sent by Lord Ying-Yuan. She was re-assigned to Yan-Xu Heavenly Palace by Lord Ying-Yuan to become his Immortal attendant, because of her expertise in chess. He realized Yan-Dan's potential and decided to train her, unbeknownst to her. He noted she was a quick and clever learner, but uninspired and lazy. He would punish her for any infractions, no matter how minor, by having her copy the heavenly scriptures numerous times. She felt like he was torturing her and complained constantly. She accidentally discovered demon spies. With help from Lord Ying-Yuan, the demon spies were vanquished.

Eventually, war between the Immortals and the Demons broke out. The Immortal army was commanded by the 4 Sovereign Lords, the Primordial Heavenly Emperor, Star Deity Huan-Qin, Celestial Deity Bei-Ming and Lord Ying-Yuan. The battle was fierce. Demons were using demon serpent Wu-Wang to try to destroy the pillars of Heaven. Yan-Dan, Yu Mo, and Li-Mu were in the palace of the main pillar of Heaven and saw it was crumbling. Yan-Dan used her Immortal powers to shore up the pillar with the help of Yu Mo and Li-Mu. Lord Ying-Yuan and Star Deity Huan-Qin fought Wu-Wang to stop it from destroying the pillars. During the battle, most of the leaders were killed, but the war was won, at great loss, and peace was restored to the Heavenly Realm. Celestial Deity Bei-Ming was bought back to his palace and was in great pain. Heavenly healers were unable to cure him. Yan-Dan and Yu Mo were by his side to try and comfort him in his pain. His Immortal spirit was damaged and shattered beyond repair. Yan-Dan used her lotus powers to bring him out of his delirium and calm him to a lucid state of mind. Yu Mo was Bei-Ming's disciple. Bei-Ming had used his magical Artifact to save Yu Mo as a promise to the Nine Fin tribe who he was great friends with. Yu Mo and Yan-Dan were able to bid Bei-Ming a tearful goodbye before he died. Lord Ying-Yuan was blinded and poisoned by the flame of Wu-Wang during the fight. The flame poison would make him go crazy and eventually, he would die. The only cure was the heart blood of a Four-leaf lotus. Lord Ying-Yuan refused to risk the life of the twin lotus sisters to save himself. He was ashamed of the great loss of his companions and other heavenly soldiers. He left in despair, went to the Land under the Horizon and chained himself to the sacred tree, to await death.

Yan-Dan was told Lord Ying-Yuan was traveling in the mortal world to recuperate. She accidentally came upon where Lord Ying-Yuan had chained himself to the sacred tree. She changed her voice, for fear he wouldn't speak to her, to talk to him to find out what had happened. She became very upset and sad on seeing his condition. She decided to find a cure for him, take care of him, and ease his pain. He realized, even though he was blind, it was Yan-Dan helping him. He kept pushing her away, but she refused to leave. While caring for him, they fell in love, but love relationships are against heavenly doctrines and punishable by death. Yan-Dan created a cottage next to the sacred tree, unchained Lord Ying-Yuan from the tree, and treated him with her lotus breath in the cottage which helped to alleviate the effects of the flame poison. He carved her a lotus blossom incense burner from agarwood. While helping the Divine turtle to go down to the mortal world, she, inadvertently, found out the cure for the flame poison. Using the Lucid Dream butterfly, Yan-Dan saw how much Lord Ying-Yuan was in love with her and she with him. She used half of her heart to cure Lord Ying-Yuan, because she couldn't bear to see him suffer in pain or die from the flame poison.

After Lord Ying-Yuan was cured, he was returned to Yan-Xu Heavenly palace. When he awoke, he had to act indifferent to Yan-Dan to keep her safe. Yan-Dan became upset because she thought Lord Ying-Yuan forgot his promises to her to recognize her when he awoke and smell the lotus blossoms in the pond in front of the cottage. She believed he cared for her sister Zhi-Xi as he was led to believe Zhi-Xi saved him, but Lord Ying-Yuan knew who really saved him and Zhi-Xi had lied about it. Zhi-Xi lied to him, because she wanted him to protect her from Curator Ying-Deng.

Curator Ying-Deng, with help from Zhi-Xi, frames Yan-Dan with poisoning her. She is sentenced to the punishment of fire by Lord Ying-Yuan at the Heavenly Gallows. Zhi-Xi is shocked by this outcome, she didn't expect Yan-Dan to be so severely punished and regretted helping Ying-Deng. Yan-Dan thinks Lord Ying-Yuan despises her, but he works to save her and with help from Marshal Hou-Den, gets a decree of immunity and sets her up in Xuan-Xin Cliffs palace. He requests Marshal Hou-De to accept Yan-Dan as his disciple to which he agrees to wholeheartedly. Zhi-Xi visits Yan-Dan in prison, hoping to clear up all the misunderstandings. Zhi-Xi regrets all her mistakes, but it's too late to do anything.

On the day of the punishment, Lord Ying-Yuan takes Yan-Dan up to the Heavenly Gallows. Yan-Dan asks Lord Ying-Yuan if he believes she was framed, he tells her he can only carry out the punishment. Yan-Dan, in despair, jumps off the Bridge of Nothingness. Lord Ying-Yuan jumps in after her and saves her. Her Immortal spirit is destroyed and she must cross over the Night Forgetting River to enter the mortal world. In order to cross over, she must let go of all her past memories and feelings. She is given a lit lantern holding her memories, is told when the light goes out and that when all memories and feelings are let go, she can enter the mortal world. When Lord Ying-Yuan returns to the Heavenly Realm, he presents himself to the Supreme Emperor for punishment of having a love relationship and survives it when most other deities would have perished.

Curator Ying-Deng creates a fake record to Zhi-Xi saying Yan-Dan has crossed the river, giving false hope to Lord Ying-Yuan, Zhi-Xi, Yu Mo, and her friend Lu-Ming. Curator wants Yan-Dan to disintegrate into ashes and to see the face of Lord Ying-Yuan's face when it happens. Lord Ying-Yuan believes Yan-Dan has crossed over and works to restore order to the Heavenly Realm. After vanquishing the remnant demons in the Heavenly realm, he discovers from the Imperial Heavenly Soldiers, during the war, a deity used her Immortal powers to hold up the heavenly pillar as it was crumbling. He realizes it was done by Yan-Dan because of the scent of lotus blossoms and uses his Immortal powers to reinforce the pillar, then he faints away into a coma. He is bought to his cottage to recuperate.

Yan-Dan spent over 800 years of her life attempting to forget Lord Ying-Yuan while attempting to cross the Night Forgetting River to enter the mortal world. Lord Ying-Yuan has been in a coma for 800 years. Li-Mu, who is now assistant to the Supreme Emperor, comes across a report sent by a Hell guard of people who haven't crossed the Night Forgetting River. The report shows Yan-Dan has not crossed over yet. He runs to Lord Ying-Yuan in the cottage to let him know, but he is still in a coma. With help from Zhi-Xi, Lord Ying-Yuan wakes up from his coma. Li-Mu tells him if Yan-Dan doesn't cross over within 900 years time, she will turn to ash. She only has 3 days left. Using the sonic beetle, Curator Ying-Deng overhears what Li-Mu has told Lord Ying-Yuan and finds out Yan-Dan has not crossed the river and plots to have her killed.

Lord Ying-Yuan tries to save Yan-Dan from turning to ashes. He receives permission from the Supreme Emperor to go and save Yan-Dan after he self-punishes himself for defying the Emperor, harming the Imperial Heavenly guards, and having a love relationship. He helps Yan-Dan, who is now partially blind and suffering from attempts to enter the mortal world by trying to cross the Night Forgetting River. He is alarmed by her appearance and his heart aches for her. He changes his voice to the Hell guard's voice, so she won't know he is helping her. He arranges for her to fall through a hole he creates in the river to reach the mortal world, but is interrupted by the King of Hell, Ning Wang, who believes if he uses the four leaf lotus, it will cure his illness as was told to him by Curator Ying-Deng through use of the sonic beetle. Lord Ying-Yuan easily defeats Ning Wang, but he finds out the other 3 sovereign lords, Star Deity, and Celestial Deity did not die as was recorded in the historical heavenly annals. He, firstly, performs a difficult spell to help Yan-Dan forget him, so she can enter the mortal world. He succeeds and Yan-Dan is sent to the mortal world.

Lord Ying-Yuan is ambushed by a dark figure who he fights off only to realize it was to keep him from further questioning Ning Wang. On arriving to the jail where Ning Wang was kept, he discovers Ning Wang was killed by having his internal core crushed. He sees the sonic beetle and destroys it. Lord Ying-Yuan reports to Supreme Emperor the deaths of his colleagues are not as recorded. He requests to go to the mortal world to find the Demons who escaped there and interrogate them to find out the truth about what had actually happened to his colleagues during the war. The Supreme Emperor grants his request and to cover up the investigation he announces Lord Ying-Yuan will be sent down to the mortal world for further penance. Before Lord Ying-Yuan leaves, he grants Yan-Dan's wish for her sister, Zhi-Xi, to ascend.

In order to find Yan-Dan's reincarnation, Yu Mo-Shan (last descendant of the Nine Fin tribe) escapes to the mortal world with help from Zhao-Lan, Princess of the South Seas Dragon clan. On arrival into the mortal world, he starts to search for Yan-Dan. He doesn't know she has not been able to cross the Night Forgetting River. He searches for her for almost 900 years and can't find her, but knows she is still alive because of the sigil on his arm, given to him by Yan-Dan while he was still working on keeping his human form at Xuan-Xin Cliffs. Ao-Yang, Prince of the East Seas Dragon clan, attacks Yu Mo after finding out he is a descendant of the Nine Fin tribe who used to rule the seas as they can control fire and water. Another fight is joined with his, Zi-Lin who is being chased by Qiu-Yi's group. During the fight, Yu Mo is injured by the soul-crashing hook used by Ao-Yang, given to him by his father. Zi-Lin helps Yu Mo escape, realizes Yu Mo is seriously injured and brings him to Qiu-Yi's magical springs where he is healed. Yu Mo helps Zi-Lin defeat the terrible tyrant lizard spirit Qiu-Yi and reluctantly, becomes co-ruler of Ye-Lan mountain, whose magical hot springs can cure all and has power boosting abilities, with Zi-Lin.

Yu Mo became a powerful ally for Yan-Dan when she starts her life after descending into the mortal world. It took a while for Yu Mo to find Yan-Dan. Ye-Lan Mountains also became their stable home together. Yan-Dan doesn't remember anything of her previous life, but she still wants to be the best playwright. In order to help Yan-Dan realize her wish, Yu Mo takes her to travel around the world, to "do one good deed every day" and experience life.

Tang Zhou (Lord Ying-Yuan mortal form/life), disciple of Ling Xiao sect of Taoism specializing in exorcism, left the sect to go out and gain experience of the world outside. After Tang Zhou is attacked, his Celestial vest is damaged. Li-Mu, who is monitoring Lord Ying-Yuan's progress, saw Tang Zhou was knocked out and ran over to revive him. Li-Mu tells him he used to be the sovereign lord and needs to repair his vest or his God Powers will destroy his body. In order to repair his vest, he needs to find the 4 Divine artifacts: 7 Luminious jade, Li Chen, Chu Mo, and Earthstop. While Yan-Dan was punishing an evil deed, she encountered detainment and persecution from Demon Slayer Tang Zhou. This starts a journey in which Yan-Dan and Tang Zhou both fought evil using wits, spells, and creativity. Shared woe, love, betrayal, hate, greed, loss, etc. She helps Tang Zhou find the four Divine artifacts needed to repair his Celestial vest. Tang Zhou, Yan-Dan, and Yu Mo discovered one mysterious thing after another. Finding the 4 divine artifacts, they discover more mysteries behind the events of the "War of Genesis", the "Divine-Demon war" and the deaths of the 3 Sovereign Lords, Celestial Deity Bei-Ming and Star Deity Huan-Qin. Involving also the safety of all 3 Realms.

== Cast ==
=== Main cast ===
- Yang Zi as Yan Dan / Bai Piaoliang

Four-leaf lotus flower.

- Cheng Yi as Ying Yuan / Tang Zhou / Xuan Ye

The nephew of the Emperor of Heaven, the immortal name Dongji Qingli Yingyuan Emperor.

- Zhang Rui as Yu Mo
- Meng Ziyi as Zhi Xi
- Li Xinze as Huan Qin
- Hou Mengyao as Tao Ziqi
- Fu Fangjun as Xuan Xiang / Liu Weiyang

=== Supporting cast ===
- Vicki Xu as Deng Xi fairy
- Zhu Yongteng as Heavenly Emperor
- He Zhonghua as Immortal Beiming
- Han Chengyu as Pei Luo
- Zhang Tianyang as Zhan Yi
- Zhang Zhixi as Ran Qing

== Four artifacts ==
Name	Original Owner	Heteromorphism	Place Of Appearance
Seven Luminaries Jade	Yueji Chiyi Wanyun Emperor	A Lifetime	Shen House
Li Chen	Tianji Zixu Zhaosheng Emperor	Beacon Smoke	Palace
Chu Mo	Yuan Shi Changsheng Emperor	All Things Are Born	Demon Phase
Earthstop	Dongji Qingli Yingyuan Emperor	Original And Passive	Fenlan Mountain

== International broadcast ==
Channel	Location	Date
VieOn	Vietnam	20 July 2022
Line TV	Taiwan	20 July 2022
TrueID	Thailand	21 July 2022
Taiwan Mobile	Taiwan	15 August 2022
LiTV	Taiwan	15 August 2022
Netflix	Taiwan	24 August 2022
Longhua TV	Taiwan	12 October 2022
Viu	Singapore	
