= Li Haiying =

Chinese film and television producer

- Born: 1977 (age 47–48); Northeast China
- Occupation(s): Businesswoman, TV producer

Li Haiying (Chinese: 李海鹰, born 1973) is a Chinese film and television producer and promoter. Li Haiying is the promoter behind many well-known Chinese TV series, such as To Be a Better Man, The First Half of My Life, White Deer Plain, and Nothing Gold Can Stay.

== Projects ==
=== TV Series ===
- 2015: The Legend of Mi Yue
- 2016: A Love for Separation, To Be a Better Man, City Still Believe In Love, etc.
- 2017: The First Half of My Life, Ode to Joy 2, White Deer Plain, Nothing Gold Can Stay, The Razor's Edge, Mr. Right, etc.
- 2018: Peace Hotel, Old Boy, The Sound of the Bell at Shanghai Bund, Your Time My Time, The Years You Were Late, Evolution of love, The Kite, The Story of Minglan, etc.
- 2019: All Is Well, etc.
