= When a Snail Falls in Love =

2016 Chinese TV series

- Genre: Crime; Suspense; Romance
- Based on: When a Snail Falls in Love by Ding Mo
- Written by: Zhu Zhu
- Directed by: Zhang Kaizhou
- Starring: Wang Kai; Wang Ziwen
- Country of origin: China
- Original language: Chinese
- No. of episodes: 21

Production
- Producer: Hou Hongliang
- Running time: 30 minutes
- Production company: Daylight Entertainment

Original release
- Network: Dragon Television
- Release: 24 October – 12 December 2016

Related
- Love Me If You Dare; Memory Lost

When a Snail Falls in Love (Chinese: 如果蜗牛有爱情; pinyin: rú guǒ wō niú yǒu ài qíng) is a 2016 Chinese television series directed by Zhang Kai-zhou and produced by Daylight Entertainment. It stars Wang Kai, Wang Ziwen, Xu Yue, and Yu Heng. It is based on Ding Mo's novel of the same title, who also wrote Love Me If You Dare starring Wallace Huo. The series aired on Dragon TV from 24 October to 12 December 2016.

The series saw 200 million online hits the first week, and on 15 November the production team announced that the show had reached 1 billion views online. The show is also popular with international viewers, with a 9.4 out 10 score on Viki, and has been praised for its suspenseful storyline and tightly woven plot.

The series was remade in Thai under the same title in 2023.

== Synopsis ==
Ji Bai is a stone-faced team leader of the Violent Crime Unit. Xu Xu is a new intern specializing in offender profiling. Tasked with solving a series of crimes that are somehow mysteriously connected, the two develop feelings for each other. Xu Xu draws comic panels of their relationship, portraying herself as a snail and Ji as a lion.

== Cast ==
- Wang Kai as Ji Bai (季白) - Detective of at Ling Police Department
- Wang Ziwen as Xu Xu (许诩) - Profiling intern at Ling Municipal Police
- Xu Yue (徐悦) as Yao Meng (姚檬) - Police intern at Ling Police Department
- Yu Heng (于恒) as Zhao Han (赵寒) - Police Officer at Ling Police Department
- Zhao Yuanyuan (赵圆瑗) as Ye Zixi (叶梓夕) - Member of the Ye family and Ji Bai's childhood friend
- Wu Xiaoyu (武笑羽) as Ye Qiao (叶俏) - Heiress of the Ye Corporation.
- Zhang Yanyan (张棪琰) as Brother Lu (噜哥) - Head of a drug cartel

== Soundtrack ==
When a Snail Falls in Love - Original Television Soundtrack (如果蜗牛有爱情电视剧原声音乐大碟)
No.	Title	Music	Length
1.	"A Snail's Walk (蜗牛行)"	Yu Zijiang
2.	"A Happiness's Final Destination (幸福的终点)"	Zeng Jian (version 1), Wang Ziwen (version 2)	4:12
3.	"Profile - Suspense"	Liu Sha	1:53
4.	"Profile - Reasoning"	Liu Sha	2:00
5.	"Profile - Premonition"	Liu Sha	1:43
6.	"Profile - Romance"	Liu Sha	3:35

== Ratings ==
- Highest ratings are marked in red, lowest ratings are marked in blue

Dragon TV CSM52 City Rating Statistics
Air date	Ratings (%)	Audience share (%)	Rank (timeslot)	Total rank
24 October 2016	0.627	4.005	1	2
31 October 2016	0.752	4.768	1	2
7 November 2016	0.733	5.05	1	3
14 November 2016	0.752	4.727	1	4
21 November 2016	0.774	4.745	1	7
28 November 2016	0.916	5.002	1	-
5 December 2016	0.948	5.192	1	-
12 December 2016	0.888	4.690	-	6

== Awards and nominations ==
Award	Category	Nominated work	Result	Ref.
2nd China Quality Television Drama Ceremony	Weekly Drama of the Year (Dragon TV)		Won	
2nd China Quality Television Drama Ceremony	Most Marketable Actor	Wang Kai	Won	
Tencent QQ Star Awards	Quality Network Drama of the Year		Won	
Tencent QQ Star Awards	Most Powerful TV Actor	Wang Kai	Won	
Tencent QQ Star Awards	Trendy TV Actress	Wang Ziwen	Won	
22nd Huading Awards	Top 10 Dramas of The Year		Won	
5th Annual DramaFever Awards	Best Chinese Language Drama		Nominated	

== International broadcast ==
Country	Network	Premiere
Sri Lanka	Rupavahini (dubbed into Sinhalese)	2018
Philippines	GMA News TV (Dubbed into Tagalog)	2019
Thailand	Tencent Video (Remade in Thai with an entirely new cast and setting.)	2023
