= Draw the Line (Chinese TV series) =

2022 Chinese television series

- 底线
- Genre: Law; Crime; Police procedural
- Written by: Fei Huijun; Li Xiaoliang
- Directed by: Liu Guotong
- Starring: Jin Dong; Cheng Yi; Cai Wenjing; Wang Xiuzhu; Wang Shasha; Wang Fang; Wu Chao
- Country of origin: China
- Original language: Mandarin
- No. of seasons: 1
- No. of episodes: 40

Production
- Executive producers: Yang Bei; Zhang Yucheng
- Producers: Yu Fei; Fu Tuo; Shen Jingjing; Wang Tianlong
- Production locations: Changsha, Hunan
- Editor: Cui Ying
- Running time: 45 minutes
- Production companies: Hunan Broadcasting System; Xiaoxiang Film; People's Court Press; Dangran Pictures; Faxin Culture; Xianjun Film and Television

Original release
- Network: Hunan Television; iQIYI; Mango TV
- Release: 19 September – 11 October 2022

Draw the Line (traditional Chinese: 底線; simplified Chinese: 底线; pinyin: Dǐxiàn) is a Chinese television series directed by Liu Guotong, starring leads Jin Dong, Cheng Yi, and Cai Wenjing, and featuring Wang Xiuzhu, Wang Shasha, Wang Fang, Wu Chao in prominent supporting roles. The series aired on Hunan Satellite TV from September 19, 2022 to October 11, 2022. and was broadcast simultaneously on Mango TV and iQiyi.

== Synopsis ==
Fang Yuan, the chief judge of the Filing Division of the Xingcheng District People's Court, and Song Yufei, the deputy chief judge of the First Criminal Division of the Rongzhou Intermediate People's Court, are both apprentices of Zhang Weimin, the vice president of the Xingcheng District People's Court. The three masters and apprentices devoted their youth and blood to China's judicial cause. Now, Fang Yuan's apprentice and legal assistant Zhou Yian has just become a post judge. The former master and apprentice team are now dispersed to different judicial positions and continue to shine. Ye Xin, a young female cadre of the Supreme Law Research Office, suddenly airborne, causing more changes in the Star City Court. These three generations of court people carry forward the fine tradition of mentoring and mentoring in each case, and they always adhere to the bottom line of justice, morality, and humanity.

== Cast ==
=== Main ===
Jin Dong as Fang Yuan

- President of the Case Filing Division of Xingcheng District People's Court. He has no airs, walks with his back hunched over, and carries a thermos cup as he shuttles through the mediation room of the Litigation Center. He has a Changsha accent when persuading people, and the clerk affectionately calls him "Aunt Fang." Long-term grassroots practice has honed Fangyuan's shrewdness and sophistication in dealing with others and "pretending to be stupid". When mediating for the parties involved, he is like a neighborhood committee aunt, speaking with sincerity and finding every opportunity to do so. Relying on his outstanding ability, he was eventually promoted to the vice president of the court.
  - Li Xiyuan portrays young Xi Yun.

Cheng Yi as Zhou Yian

- A young judge with a strong sense of justice, he is decent, dedicated to his duties, and spares no effort to uphold justice. He has a sunny personality and a sense of humor. Although he is very serious at work, he is really cute in private. He is very good at flattering his master, and will bully and hug him if he disagrees with her. When Ye Xin met Zhou Yian for the first time, she discovered that he used some "special" methods to mediate the case and pointed out that his behavior was wrong. Zhou Yian also refused to give in, and the two often fought against each other.

Cai Wenjing as Ye Xin

- The leader of the Supreme People's Court went to the court where Zhou Yian was located in order to apply for training. When he applied for a dormitory, he happened to live opposite Zhou Yian. The two are neighbors and colleagues, and they slowly break down their prejudices as they continue to get along. In Zhou Yian's eyes, Ye Xin is "Sister Fa Tiao". She opens her mouth and shuts up on legal terms. She is not down-to-earth at all and feels a bit condescending.

=== Supporting ===
- Wang Xiuzhu as Song Yufei
- Wang Shasha as Shu Su
- Wang Fang as Sheng Fangming
- Li Fanning as Wu Chao
- Wang Zi Quan as Xu Tian Xu [Lawyer]
- Wang Jin Song as Chen Kang
- Zhao Zi Qi as Li Xiao Le [Fang Yuan's wife]
- Zhang Xi Wei as Fang Ke Li [Fang Yuan's daughter]
- Zeng Meng Xue as Zhong Yuan Yuan [Judge]
- Wang Yi Nan as Wang Xiu Fang
- Hu Hao Bo as Wei Zhen Hua
- Zhang Zhi Jian as Zhang Wei Min
- Mu Li Yan as Zhou Yi An's mother
- Liu Jun as Ye Cun Yuan [Ye Xin's father]
- Li Si Nan as Ma Kun
- Cao Lei as Kuang Tian Shu [Lawyer]
- Yin Jun Zheng as Lu Zhong Hua [Judge]
- Wang Wen Ze as Xiao Xiao

== Soundtrack ==
No.	Title	Lyrics	Music	Singers	Length
1.	"Ask the Heart (问心)" (Promotional song)	Jeximi (Liu Jie)	Jeximi (Liu Jie)	Zhang Jie	3:17
2.	"Promise (承诺)" (Theme song)	Xu Nuo	Zhang Wei	Lei Jia	4:50
3.	"You are the spring rain (你是春雨)"	Rong Zijia	Zheng Bingbing	Duan Aojuan & Li Zhimo	3:39
4.	"How to Speak (如何言说)"	He Zheng	He Zheng	He Jie	4:34

== Production ==
=== Script writing ===
Director Liu Guotong said that during the preparation of the play, under the guidance of the Supreme People's Court, the creators went to more than 60 courts at all levels across the country for research, interviewed more than 200 front-line court workers, and collected more than 500 representative cases to immerse themselves in the daily work and life of the court. They revised 20 drafts of the script; during the filming, more than 400 creatives shot scenes in more than 170 places in Changsha, and the crew built 3,000 square meters and 40 court interiors, striving to make every detail realistic.

=== Production team ===
The play was created under the guidance of the Supreme People's Court, the Propaganda Department of the Hunan Provincial Committee of the Chinese Communist Party, and the Hunan Provincial Radio and Television Bureau, and was supervised by the Information Bureau of the Supreme People's Court and the Case Filing Division of the Supreme People's Court. Li Guangyu, deputy director of the Political Department and deputy director of the Information Bureau of the Supreme People's Court, and Qian Xiaochen, president of the filing tribunal, served as the chief planners. In order to ensure the authenticity and professionalism of the plot, during the filming process, the Supreme People's Court assigned local court experts to be on site throughout the entire filming process, and strictly controlled the content, scenes, costumes, props and other details in the play.

=== Shooting process ===
The main creative team of the play was organized by the Supreme People's Court and the Hunan Provincial Radio and Television Bureau. It began to conceive in 2019, started collecting stories in October 2020 (which lasted more than 90 days), and then started filming in February 2022 (February 26 A start-up ceremony was held at the People's Court of Changsha County, Hunan Province, on May 30 of the same year. The shooting was completed on May 30 of the same year (94 days of AB double-team shooting), which lasted a total of 3 years.

== Awards and nominations ==
Year	Award	Category	Recipient	Result	Ref.
2023	2022 Weibo Night	2022 Weibo annual drama series	Draw The Line	Won	
2023	2023 Capital TV Program Spring Promotion Conference	Excellent TV series of the year	Draw The Line	Won	
