= Young Sherlock (Chinese TV series) =

- Also known as: Yuanfang and Renjie
- Genre: Gong'an fiction
- Created by: Chen Yuan; Li Xiaoping; Jin Zhongbo
- Written by: Zhou Bingkun
- Directed by: Lin Feng
- Starring: Bosco Wong; Qi Wei; Ma Tianyu; Sun Xiaoxiao; Ruby Lin; Yuan Hong
- Country of origin: China
- Original language: Mandarin
- No. of episodes: 40

Production
- Executive producers: Jiang Xinguang; Tian Tian; Lisa Tan
- Producer: Zhong Junyan
- Production location: Hengdian World Studios
- Running time: 45 minutes
- Production companies: Ruby Lin Studio; H&R Century Pictures

Original release
- Network: Zhejiang Television
- Release: 3 June 2014

Young Sherlock (Chinese: 少年神探狄仁杰) is a 2014 Chinese television series starring Bosco Wong as a young detective Di Renjie (best known in the west for the fictionalized Judge Dee stories). The series premiered on Zhejiang TV on 3 June 2014.

== Synopsis ==
Young Sherlock tells of a series of thrilling and cryptic cases faced by 26-year-old protagonist Di Renjie (Bosco Wong). With him on his travels are his close friend Wang Yuanfang (Ma Tianyu), medical expert and love interest Li Wanqing (Stephy Qi), and childhood friend Tong Mengyao (Cindy Sun). Together, the four unravel various bizarre mysteries that take place during the Tang dynasty.

== Cast ==
- Bosco Wong as Di Renjie
- Qi Wei as Li Wanqing
- Ma Tianyu as Wang Yuanfang
- Sun Xiaoxiao as Tong Mengyao
- Ruby Lin as Wu Meiniang
- Yuan Hong as Li Zhi
- Liang Yo-lin as Du Jingqiu
- Li Jiahang as Chu Shangyuan
- Hang Rui as Li Runnan
- Sun Yaoqi as Wu Qianqian
- Reyizha Alimjan as Shenji
- Lee Li-chun as white-haired man
- Qiu Shuang as Erbao
- Shi Dasheng as Wang Youren
- Liu Yi as Zhangsun Wuji
- Liu Jun as Chu Suiliang
- Li Wenwen as Consort Xu
- Wang Zhifei as Xue Yong
- Zheng Xiaoning as Wang Bo
- Wu Jinyan as Li Qian

== Soundtrack ==
- Opening theme song: Listen to the Wind Howl (聽風嘯) by Bosco Wong
- Ending theme song: Accompany you to the End of the World (陪你天涯) by Qi Wei
- Falling Flowers (落花) by Ma Tianyu
- Missing the Beauty (念紅顔) by Qiu Shuang & Sun Xiaoxiao
