= The Devotion of Suspect X (film) =

- The Devotion of Suspect X 2017 film poster
- Directed by: Alec Su
- Screenplay by: Li Jiaying; Huang Hai; Chang Jiang; Wang Chao; Chi Hai
- Based on: The Devotion of Suspect X by Keigo Higashino
- Produced by: Jimmy Huang
- Starring: Wang Kai; Zhang Luyi; Ruby Lin
- Music by: Michiru Ōshima
- Production companies: Beijing Enlight Media; Kross Pictures; Beijing Lead Star TV and Film Media; China Wit Media
- Distributed by: Beijing Enlight Media (China); Korea Screen (South Korea)
- Release dates: March 31, 2017 (China); April 19, 2018 (South Korea)
- Running time: 112 minutes
- Countries: China; South Korea
- Language: Mandarin
- Box office: US$59.25 million

The Devotion of Suspect X (Chinese: 嫌疑人X的献身; pinyin: Xiányírén X de Xiànshēn) is a 2017 mystery thriller film based on the novel The Devotion of Suspect X, written by Keigo Higashino. The film is second film directed by Alec Su, and stars Wang Kai, Zhang Luyi, and Ruby Lin. The film was released in China and in North America on March 31, 2017.

== Plot ==
Shi Hong is a brilliant mathematics teacher who is a recluse but likes the active company of his neighbor, divorcee Chen Jing and her young daughter through the thin walls. When Fu Jian, Chen Jing's abusive ex-husband, suddenly shows up trying to extort money from Chen Jing, threatening both her and her daughter, the situation spirals out of control and Fu Jian is killed. Shi Hong offers to help Chen Jing and her daughter cover up the crime, but when his former classmate and police consultant, Tang Chuan, becomes involved in investigating the murder, Shi Hong must betray his friend's trust and involve himself in a dangerous cat-and-mouse game that reveals the depths of his feelings for Chen Jing and her daughter. Tang Chuan catches him but only to later understand it was on his own terms and resumes their teenage years friendship which was based on mathematics.

== Cast ==
- Wang Kai as Tang Chuan
- Zhang Luyi as Shi Hong
- Ruby Lin as Chen Jing
- Hou Minghao as young Tang Chuan
- Yan Xujia as young Shi Hong
- Deng Enxi as Chen Xiaoxin

== Soundtrack ==
- "Innocent" ("清白"), performed by Kit Chan. Alec Su, the film's director, handwrote the subtitles of the lyrics for the music video.

== Box office ==
The Chinese adaptation of Japanese crime thriller The Devotion of Suspect X maintained strongly in second place with $29.34m for $52.66m after 10 days.

== Awards and nominations ==
Year	Award	Category	Recipients	Result	Ref.
2018	9th China Film Director's Guild Awards	Best Film	The Devotion of Suspect X	Nominated	
2018	9th China Film Director's Guild Awards	Best Actor	Zhang Luyi	Nominated	
2018	23rd Huading Awards	Best Actress	Ruby Lin	Won	
