= Impossible (2015 film) =

- Poster
- Chinese: 不可思异
- Directed by: Sun Zhou
- Starring: Wang Baoqiang
- Music by: Deddy Tzur and Daniel Alcheh
- Distributed by: Star Union Skykee (Beijing) Entertainment; Guangdong Zhujiang Film Group; Huace Pictures (Tianjing); Alibaba Pictures
- Release date: 4 December 2015
- Running time: 99 minutes
- Country: China
- Language: Mandarin
- Box office: CN¥80.4 million

Impossible (Chinese: 不可思异) is a 2015 Chinese science fiction comedy film directed by Sun Zhou. It was released on December 4, 2015 in 2D and 3D.

== Plot ==
Memeda, a "human detector" from outer space happens to meet a depressed man who just lost his daughter in a car accident. After delving into Liguo's heart, Memeda decides to follow this poor man and studies him inside out, however, it eventually gets itself into the complicated "human world". As a powerful careerist, Wu yiran shows no mercy to anyone: he successfully squeezes Liguo and his partner Ruoshui's company out of business, nevertheless, he wants to use Memeda's superpower and makes him the emperor of mankind!......

== Cast ==
- Wang Baoqiang
- Xiaoshenyang
- Da Peng
- Yin Zheng
- Cheng Yi
- Xin Zhilei

== Music ==
The original score was composed by Deddy Tzur and Daniel Alcheh, and features soloists recorded in Los Angeles and orchestras recorded in Europe. The score was mixed by Elliot Hunt in 5.1 surround at alcheh&hunt studios in Boulder, CO and mastered by Dominic Maita in Boulder, CO. Additional mixing was done by Michael Seifert for Comba-Music for Yuli Studio in Beijing.

=== Theme Song: We Go On ===
The theme song "We Go On," co-written by composer Daniel Alcheh and lyricist Jamie Kiffel-Alcheh, was produced by Elliot Hunt and mastered by Dominic Maita. It is an orchestral power-ballad featured in the climax of the film, with instrumental versions throughout the film. The track is sung by American pop singer Grey, who became known after her appearance on NBC's The Voice, where she landed a spot on Adam Levine's team.

== International Film Releasing ==
The movie was only released in all south east asian countries such as: Cambodia (hang meas), Brunei (Regalblue Production), Malaysia (Astro Shaw), and Samoa (southseas Pictures.)

== Reception ==
The film grossed US$8.52 million on its opening weekend in China.
