= Memory Lost =

- Genre: Crime; Suspense; Romance
- Based on: Mei Ren Wei Xian by Ding Mo
- Written by: Yu Zheng; Ding Mo
- Directed by: Li Dachao; Liang Qinxuan
- Starring: Yang Rong; Bai Yu
- Country of origin: China
- Original language: Chinese
- No. of seasons: 3
- No. of episodes: 36

Production
- Producers: Yu Zheng; Dai Ying
- Production companies: iQiyi New Classics Media; Zeus Entertainment.

Original release
- Network: iQiyi
- Release: 24 October 2016

Memory Lost (Chinese: 美人为馅; pinyin: Měirén wéi xiàn) is a 2016 Chinese streaming television series produced by iQiyi, starring Yang Rong and Bai Yu. It is based on the detective trilogy of the same name by Ding Mo. The series premiered on 24 October 2016 via iQiyi, and aired for three seasons.

The series has a total of 2.3 billion online views, and also gained an international following.

== Synopsis ==
Highly intelligent police officer Bai Jingxi works with her partner Han Chen to solve many difficult cases using her outstanding deductive reasoning.

=== Season One ===
A misunderstanding causes Bai Jingxi and Han Chen to meet. The two meet again while solving a rape case, and Bai Jingxi discovers that Han Chen is actually an experienced criminal police, and his use of traditional investigation methods impresses her. The two resolves their misunderstandings and develops feelings for each other. Because of an incident five years ago, Han Chen loses part of his memory, but remembers that he has a fiancee. In order to find the woman, he tries all sorts of methods, while rejecting the growing love between him and Bai Jingxi. Later, Bai Jingxi was deployed to the same team as Han Chen to investigate a bizarre incident. As the two protects each other in the midst of dangers, Han Chen realizes that he truly loves Bai Jingxi. He promises her that he will answer to her after discovering the truth behind his lost memories.

=== Season Two ===
Han Chen eventually discovers that Bai Jingxi is actually his long-lost fiancee, Su Mian. An incident which stemmed from serial murder case five years ago was the cause of their lost memories. Under a single alphabet code name, the members of the criminal organization kill people for fun. When they were about to be arrested, they released a bomb and kidnapped Su Mian, thereafter changing her identity to that of her cousin's, whom they kill. Han Chen and Su Mian slowly recover their memories; and just when they were about to team up and confront the criminal organization, they found out that the psychotic killers were already right beside them.

=== Season Three ===
Under Han Chen and Su Mian's persistent chase, the criminal organization sends out a declaration letter. The city was instantly plagued with dangers, starting from the explosion of bomb jackets in the city square. Han Chen and Su Mian set out to stop the murderers, and in the process discover their actual identities. The leader of the organization, code-named S, is actually Su Mian's good friend Xu Sibai. Xu's father was the murderer of Su Mian's father. Xu has actually had a crush on Su Mian for years, but because of her rejection, had developed a grudge against her. Five years ago, Xu had planned a huge conspiracy to fake the death of Su Mian. Bai Jingxi, who is actually Su Mian's cousin and looked like her, actually died in place of Su Mian; while Su Mian took on Bai Jingxi's identity. This incident causes Han Chen, Su Mian as well as Xu Sibai to have their memories erased simultaneously, thus allowing Xu Sibai to stay by Su Mian's side. All the members of the Murder Organization died and Xu Sibai was also assumed to be dead. However, after the case was closed, a portrait of Su Mian was left on the roadside, bearing the signature of S.

== Cast ==
Actor	Character	Description
Yang Rong	Bai Jingxi / Su Mian	Member of the civic police team and the Black Shield Team; specializes in criminal psychology. Code-named H, she went undercover as a member of the murder organization. She never killed anyone; her "skill" was making a murder look like an accident. Loses her memory because the Murder organization erased her memory.
Bai Yu	Han Chen	Vice-chief of the civic police team, member of the Black Shield Team; specializes in criminal investigation. Loses his memory because the Murder Organization erased his memories. He is haunted by mysterious memories of his fiancee, whose existence everyone else denies.
Evan Li	Xu Sibai	Code-named S, originally the leader of the Murder Organization. He later takes on the identity of a forensic doctor and becomes Jin Xi's close friend. He has always been in love with her, but she is oblivious to his feelings and sees him as a "buddy".
He Fengtian	Zhou Xiaozhuan	Member of the civic police team and the Black Shield Team who specializes in computers and hacking. He is one of Su Mian's closest friends whom she treats as a little brother. He is goofy and naive, but is loyal to his team.
Nan Fulong	Chi Chen (Leng Mian)	Member of the civic police team and the Black Shield Team; Agile and good with rifle combat. He is called "Poker Face" because he is always stoic and calm. Xia Ziqi's Boyfriend.
Wang Yu	Shi Heng (Lao Dao)	Member of the civic police team and the Black Shield Team; good at trace evidence and fingerprints. He is nicknamed "Chatterbox" because he is very talkative. Always has a toothpick in his mouth.
Liang Baoling	Xia Ziqi	Nurse at the hospital, Chi Chen's girlfriend.
Sun Xiaoxiao	Xin Jia	Han Chen's childhood friend, who is in love with him. Code-named E, a member of the Alphabet Syndicate. Her specialty is poison but she never actively kills anyone.
Qi Ji	Xu Nanbo	A criminal psychology professor who used to be Su Mian's senior. Code-named K, he is actually a member of the Alphabet Syndicate. He is adept at the art of hypnotism. He never kills anyone himself, instead always hypnotizing people to kill each other or themselves. He had a complicated relationship with his father (also Su Mian's professor in criminal psychology), whom he struggled to impress.
Chu Junchen	Ji Zichang	Code-named L, a member of the Alphabet Syndicate. He both works with and is in love with E. He uses E's poisons to kill, and then positions his victims as paintings or sculptures. He is known to be a neat freak and germaphobe.
Merxat	Xie Lu	Code-named T, a member of the Alphabet Syndicate. He is a sniper trained as a young child by S. Though he has no specific desire to kill, like E, he has no problem in doing so. His murdering is largely motivated by a desire for revenge and justice.
Zhang Yijie	Xia Junai	Code-named A, a member of the Alphabet Syndicate. He was raised by S and is adept at explosions. He is the group's youngest member, very impulsive and has a flair for performance. He calls Su Mian his sister because she once treated him kindly.
Tian Muchen	Luo Bin	Code-named R, a member of the Alphabet Syndicate. He is a professional hacker who watches over the other members and keeps all computer data off of them more than he kills.
Zhao Yiqin	Mu Fangcheng	Code-named M, a cafe owner and member of the Alphabet Syndicate. He makes art out of the people he kills. Killed by Han Chen 5 years ago, before the events of the series.
Gao Yu'er	Yue Luoxia	Member of the CS team.
Ren Jialun	Zhang Muhan	Member of the CS team.
Chen Haoyu	Zhao Manman	

== Soundtrack ==
Memory Lost - Original Television Soundtrack (美人为馅电视剧原声音乐大碟)
No.	Title	Music	Length
1.	"Deep Sleep (沉眠)"	Yang Rong & Bai Yu
2.	"Light (光)"	Ceng Di

== See also ==
- Love Me If You Dare (2015)
- When a Snail Falls in Love (2016)
