= Give Seven Days =

- Directed by: Tang Xu
- Production companies: Zuen Entertainment Media（Beijing）Co., Ltd
- Release date: November 21, 2014
- Running time: 95 minutes
- Country: China
- Language: Mandarin
- Box office: ¥0.15 million (China)

Give Seven Days (Chinese: 换爱七日), also known as Destiny of Love, is a 2014 Chinese romantic comedy film directed by Tang Xu. It was released on November 21, 2014. Remake of the U.S.A. movie "The Holiday" (2006).

== Cast ==
- Yu Vicky (Yu Xintian)
- Yin Zheng
- Xu Cenzi
- Wong Kiray
- Yvonne Yung
- Jing Gangshan
- Li Bin
- Zhang He
- Shan Ye

== Reception ==
=== Box office ===
By November 25, 2014, the film had earned ¥0.15 million at the Chinese box office.
