= Yin Zheng (actor) =

Chinese actor (born 1986)

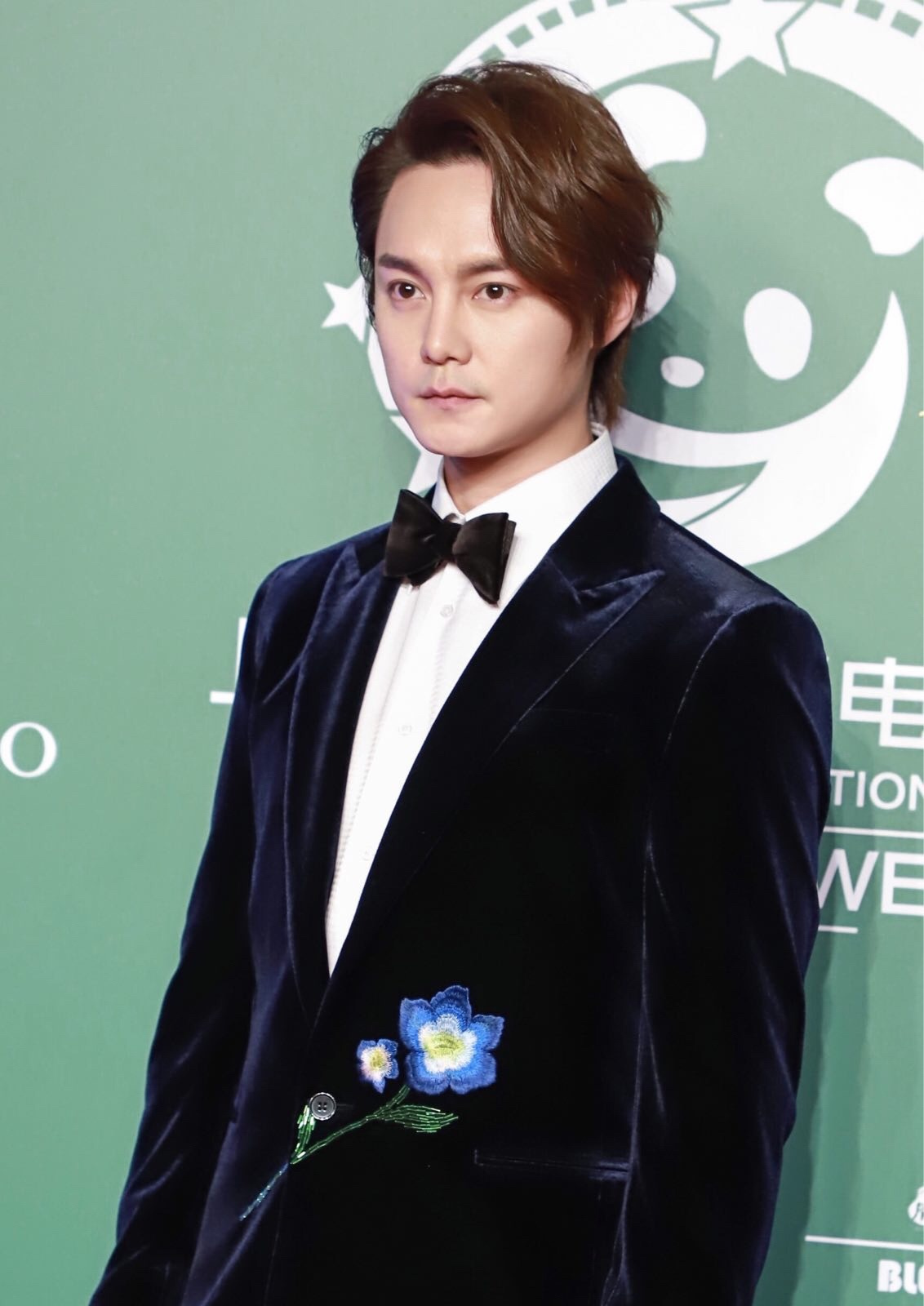
- Yin Zheng in 2017
- Born: Tan Jun Peng （谭峻鹏） December 30, 1986 (age 39); Baotou, Inner Mongolia, China
- Other name: Andrew
- Education: Xinghai Conservatory of Music
- Occupation: Actor
- Years active: 2011–present
- Agent: Mountain Top

Tan Junpeng (Chinese: 谭峻鹏; pinyin: Tán Jùnpénɡ; born 30 December 1986), known by his stage name Yin Zheng (Chinese: 尹正; pinyin: Yǐn Zhèng), is a Chinese actor. He is known for his roles in Love Me, If You Dare, Goodbye Mr. Loser, Sparrow, Original Sin and Winter Begonia.

== Filmography ==
=== Film ===
Year	English title	Chinese title	Role	Notes/Ref.
2014	Last Flight	绝命航班	Wan Hu	
2014	Inside the Girls	女生宿舍	Zou Zhiyong	
2014	Give Seven Days	换爱七日	Ai Qing	
2015	Goodbye Mr. Loser	夏洛特烦恼	Yuan Hua	
2015	Impossible	不可思异	William	
2018	Never Say Die	羞羞的铁拳		
2019	The Great Detective	大侦探霍桑	Bao Lang	
2019	Pegasus	飞驰人生	Sun Yuqiang	
2022	Only Fools Rush In	四海		
TBA	Faces in the Crowd	暴风	Twelfth Master	Special Appearance

=== Television series ===
Year	English title	Chinese title	Role	Notes/Ref.
2013	Longmen Express	龙门镖局	Shan Ji	
2015	Vigour of Green Olive	红色青橄榄	Lang Xing	
2015	Love Me, If You Dare	他来了，请闭眼	Fu Ziyu	
2015	Miss Unlucky	乌鸦嘴妙女郎	Qiao Muyu	
2016	The Classic of Mountains and Seas	山海经之赤影传说	Su Shui	
2016	Sparrow	麻雀	Su Shanxing	
2016	Legend of Ace	极品家丁	Gao Qiu	
2017	A Chinese Odyssey: Love of Eternity	大话西游之爱你一万年	Tang Seng	
2018	Original Sin	原生之罪	Lu Li	
2019	Arsenal Military Academy	烈火军校	Prince Cheng Rui	
2020	Winter Begonia	鬓边不是海棠红	Shang Xirui	
2020	The Gap	一念无间	Su Zhe	
2021	A Young Couple	加油！小夫妻	Li Yan	

=== Variety show ===
Year	English title	Chinese title	Role	Notes/Ref.
2016	Lost in Food	食在囧途		
2019	The Protectors	小小的追球	Cast member	
2021	Call Me By Fire	披荆斩棘的哥哥	Contestant	

== Discography ==
Year	English title	Chinese title	Role	Notes/Ref.
2016	"Yi Jian Mei 2.0"	一剪梅2.0		
2017	"Yi Sheng Suo Ai"	一生所爱	A Chinese Odyssey: Love of Eternity OST	
2018	"Fight My By Side"	与我并肩	Original Sin OST	

== Awards and nominations ==
Year	Award	Category	Nominated work	Results	Ref.
2015	Asian Influence Awards	Leaping Actor	—N/a	Won	
2016	China Fashion WeMedia Awards	Most Promising Celebrity	—N/a	Won	
2016	19th Huading Awards	Best New Actor	Love Me, If You Dare	Won	
2017	China TV Drama Awards	Audience's Favorite Character	Sparrow	Won	
2020	7th The Actors of China Award Ceremony	Best Actor (Web series)	—N/a	Pending	
