= Love Me If You Dare (TV series) =

- Drama poster
- Also known as: Close Your Eyes and Close to Me
- Simplified Chinese: 他来了请闭眼
- Hanyu Pinyin: Ta Lai Le Qing Bi Yan
- Genre: Crime; Suspense; Romance
- Based on: When He Comes, Close Your Eyes by Ding Mo
- Written by: Hai Yan
- Directed by: Zhang Kaizhou
- Starring: Wallace Huo; Sandra Ma; Zhang Luyi; Wang Kai; Yin Zheng
- Ending theme: Obsessed With You (为你沉迷) by Juno
- Country of origin: China
- Original language: Mandarin
- No. of episodes: 24

Production
- Executive producer: Hou Hongliang
- Producer: Kong Sheng
- Production locations: China (Qingdao), New York City
- Running time: 45 minutes
- Production companies: Sohu TV; Shandong Media Group; SMG Pictures; Daylight Entertainment

Original release
- Network: Sohu, Dragon TV
- Release: 15 October 2015 – 4 January 2016

Related
- When a Snail Falls in Love (2016); Memory Lost (2016)

Love Me If You Dare (Chinese: 他来了，请闭眼) is a 2015 Chinese television series that is adapted from Ding Mo's novel of the same name published in July 2014. The series is produced by Kong Sheng and Hou Hongliang, with the screenplay written by Hai Yan. It stars Wallace Huo, Sandra Ma, Zhang Luyi, Wang Kai and Yin Zheng. The drama was aired simultaneously on Sohu and Dragon TV from 15 October 2015 to 4 January 2016.

The drama was praised for its storyline and character development, rating 9.6 out of 10 on viki.com with a significant following abroad, becoming one of the highest rated television series on Viki.

== Synopsis ==
Simon/Jin Yan (Wallace Huo) is a psychologist who returns to China from the US after a close encounter with a serial killer, but his ordeal is not over yet. Together with his assistant, Jenny/Jian Yao (Sandra Ma), police officer Li Xunran (Wang Kai), and friend Fu Ziyu (Yin Zheng) they solve mysterious and violent criminal cases.

== Cast ==
Role	Cast	Brief description
Simon / Bo Jinyan 薄靳言	Wallace Huo	Male, age 30. He is a criminologist, the youngest visiting professor of the University of Maryland (US). He works as an analyst/advisor for the serious criminal cases in the police department. He lost his father at an early age and moved to the United States with his mother. He has a high IQ but low EQ, and this dramatic contrast adds a lot of humour and emotion.
Jenny / Jian Yao 简瑶	Ma Sichun	Female, age 23. She graduated from the University of Foreign Languages. She is deeply influenced by her father, a veteran police officer of criminal investigations who died on duty. She has a great sense of justice and is very observant. She works as Simon's assistant and his translator, and ends up helping Simon in the criminal investigation.
Jabber / Xie Han 谢晗	Zhang Luyi	Male, age 30. He is the son of a rich American businessman. His parents were divorced when he was young and he was abandoned with his alcoholic father, who later abused him violently. He is smart and was a literature student at Princeton University. However, due to his distorted personality, he was expelled from the school before he could finish his studies.
Li Xunran 李熏然	Wang Kai	Male, age 28. Li grew up with Jenny and he is from a police family too. He has become a policeman and is an excellent shooter， and is knowledgeable in handling weapons. He is tough, talented, and an outstanding policeman.
Fu Ziyu 傅子遇	Yin Zheng	Male, age 30. Kris graduated from University of Maryland School of Medicine, and is known as an outstanding medical student as well as being extremely proficient in software design and coding. He is tall, gentle, smart, and is the only friend of Simon, willing to help Simon and stay with him whenever he needs.
Susan	Emilie O'hana	She is a police officer/a friend of Simon, who helps Simon to capture the Killers.
Dr. Barnes	Matt William Knowles	He plays a doctor who also helps Simon with his plan of capturing the serial killer.

== Ratings ==
- Highest ratings are marked in red, lowest ratings are marked in blue

Episode #	Air date	Dragon TV Premiere CSM50 City Rating			Sohu broadcast traffic (cutoff)
Episode #	Air date	Ratings (%)	Audience share (%)	Rank	Sohu broadcast traffic (cutoff)
1-2	2015.10.15	0.675	3.450	1	-
3-4	2015.10.22	0.653	3.729	1	100 million
5-6	2015.10.29	0.655	3.771	1	200 million+ by 1 November
7-8	2015.11.05	0.667	3.466	1	300 million+ by 8 November
9-10	2015.11.12	0.663	3.291	1	400 million+ by 15 November
11-12	2015.11.19	0.615	3.092	1	500 million+ by 20 November
13-14	2015.11.26	0.477	2.625	1	600 million+ by 27 November
15-16	2015.12.03	0.548	2.660	1	700 million+ by 3 December
17-18	2015.12.10	0.511	2.668	1	800 million+ by 9 December
19-20	2015.12.17	0.578	3.044	1	900 million+ by 13 December
21-22	2015.12.24	0.535	2.708	1	1 billion+ by 20 December
23-24	2016.01.04	0.318	2.264	1	1.1 billion+ by 27 December

== Awards and nominations ==
Award	Category	Nominated work	Result
1st China Quality Television Drama Ceremony	Innovative Themed Drama of the Year		Won
1st China Quality Television Drama Ceremony	Most Popular Actor	Wallace Huo (also for The Imperial Doctress)	Won
1st China Quality Television Drama Ceremony	Most Marketable Actor	Wallace Huo (also for The Imperial Doctress)	Won
19th Huading Awards	Best Actor (Contemporary)	Wallace Huo	Nominated
19th Huading Awards	Best Newcomer	Yin Zheng	Won
