= Inside the Girls =

- Directed by: Liang Ting
- Release date: September 12, 2014 (China)
- Running time: 103 minutes
- Country: China
- Box office: ¥12.36 million (China)

Inside the Girls (女生宿舍, Nu Sheng Su She) is a 2014 Chinese suspense thriller film directed by Liang Ting. It was released on September 12, 2014.

== Plot ==
A story of two girls who moved into an old haunted dormitory and thereafter, they began getting involved in the mysterious deaths of their roomies. The film is set in 1930s China.

== Cast ==
- Wen Xin 温心 as Xia Mengqian
- Zhao Duo-na 赵多娜 as Fang Huiru
- Cheng Yi
- Yin Zheng
- Jelly 赵美彤
- Wang Qianyi 王千一
- Du Shuangyu
- Jing Gangshan

== Box office ==
By September 28, it had earned ¥12.36 million at the Chinese box office.
