= Railroad Tigers =

- Theatrical release poster
- Traditional Chinese: 鐵道飛虎
- Simplified Chinese: 铁道飞虎
- Literal meaning: railroad flying tigers
- Hanyu Pinyin: tiědào fēi hǔ
- Directed by: Ding Sheng
- Written by: Ding Sheng; He Keke
- Produced by: Zhou Mao Fei; Zhao Lei
- Starring: Jackie Chan; Huang Zitao; Jaycee Chan; Wang Kai; Wang Ta Lu
- Cinematography: Ding Yu
- Edited by: Ding Sheng
- Music by: Loudboy
- Production companies: Shanghai Film Group; Yaolai Entertainment Media; Shanghai New Culture Media Group; Beijing Motianlun Media
- Distributed by: Yuyue Film Company
- Release date: 23 December 2016
- Running time: 124 minutes
- Country: China
- Languages: Mandarin; Japanese
- Budget: US$50 million
- Box office: US$103 million

Railroad Tigers is a 2016 Chinese action comedy film directed by Ding Sheng and starring Jackie Chan. It was released in China on December 23, 2016. The film is about a railroad worker who leads a team of freedom fighters to oppose the Japanese during the occupation in World War II. The film performed well at the box office.

== Plot ==
In 2016, at a school field trip, a small child sneaks into an old train and notices a glowing rock inside a locomotive's coal compartment.

In December 1941, Japan expands the occupation of its neighbouring countries to Southeast Asia. The railway from Tianjin to Nanjing in East China became a key military transportation route, heavily guarded by Japanese Guizi. Railroad worker Ma Yuan (Jackie Chan) leads a team of freedom fighters. Using his deep knowledge of the train network, he and his men sabotage it, ambushing Guizi and knock them unconscious. After stripping them and drawing tigers with wings on their bodies, they escape from the trains, but not before stealing supplies to feed the starving Chinese. The local Chinese call the unlikely heroes the “Railroad Tigers”.

At night, Ma's house wall is broken by a Chinese soldier fleeing a mob of Guizi. They allow him to hide while the mob searches his house. He is on a mission to detonate a bridge to delay the Japanese advancement of the area. Despite a major leg injury, he asks them to put him on a train back to rejoin the army. The train is intercepted and he is shot. Ma decides to fulfill his mission and creates a plot with his friends to destroy the bridge.

Although the freedom fighters have no weapons of their own, they employ whatever tools are at hand, including a hammer and shovels, loose railway track planks and diverted trains. At a railway depot, they improvise a pulley system which allows them to both pull out packages of ammunition and incapacitate the Guizi guarding the warehouse. When escaping on a nearby train, they are surrounded and outgunned by Guizi, but still manage to escape by throwing onboard packages of food at them and outsmarting them with guerilla tactics.

They are finally arrested but the Guizi's translator is more annoying than them and derails their questioning. With Ma and one of his accomplices locked in a cage and put on a train to be sent to punishment, the train is again intercepted by his band. Initially their efforts are not good enough until the guards watching over them are shot by a particularly sharp PLA shooter on horseback who joins them in the act.

Donning uniforms from Guizi they incapacitated, they sneak onto another supply train which is set to travel on the bridge they want to blow up. Slowly, they are able to use the weapons travelling onboard the train to take control of it despite multiple fights with enemy generals who continue to survive and fight back against all odds. The team splits with some being thrown off the train.

The locomotive's water tank is ruptured and the train comes to a halt just before the bridge. One of the team members who fell behind hijacks a second locomotive right behind it, destroys the brake and jumps out. The locomotive pushes them onto the bridge.

They are surrounded by Guizi soldiers until PLA infantry catches up and engages them. Ma gets into a handfight with a Japanese general, but the general is shot by one of his accomplices, allowing Ma to tie himself to a rope, jump and wrap himself around one of the bridge's support columns.

After many missed opportunities and missed shots, the bridge is blown up by the ragtag Chinese railroad tigers.

In 2016, the child is found by his Dad who proceeds to tell him stories about the railroaders who saved their country.

== Cast ==
- Jackie Chan as Ma Yuan
- Huang Zitao as Da Hai
- Wang Kai as Fan Chuan
- Darren Wang as Da Guo
- Sang Ping as Dakui
- Xu Fan as Auntie Qin
- Jaycee Chan as Rui Ge
- Hiroyuki Ikeuchi as Captain Yamaguchi (Japanese: 陸軍大尉山口, Rikugun-Tai-i Yamaguchi)
- Zhang Lanxin as Yuko
- Andy Lau as School Teacher (cameo)

== Production ==
The budget of the film is US$50 million. The film had railway sequences shot in Diaobingshan using steam trains.

== Release ==
On September 1, 2016, Well Go Entertainment announced the acquisition of Railroad Tigers for distribution in English-language territories including North America, the United Kingdom, Australia and New Zealand. The film opened in December to coincide with its release in China.

== Reception ==
The film grossed CN¥215 million (US$30.1 million) on its opening weekend in China. It has grossed CN¥697.2 million in China. As of June 2020, the film holds a 38% approval rating on review aggregator website Rotten Tomatoes, based on 34 reviews with an average rating of 5.49/10. The site's critical consensus reads: "Railroad Tigers throws a few sparks hearkening back to Jackie Chan's glory days as an action comedy star, but they're smothered by an unfocused story and jarring shifts in tone."

Peter DeBruge of Variety criticized Railroad Tigers as "instantly forgettable" and "a tired, often incomprehensible mess". Nick Allen of RogerEbert.com gave the film one and a half out of four stars, criticizing it as unengaging with both the lack of tension and mishandled tonal combination of slapstick comedy with seriousness, stating that "[Railroad Tigers] doesn’t have the finesse to pull off a more innocent riff on [Inglourious Basterds]." Fellow RogerEbert.com critic Simon Abrams, however, considered the film to be superior to Chan's later film The Foreigner.

Clarence Tsui of The Hollywood Reporter gave the film a positive review, considering it to be a "pretty effective" action comedy; he wrote that despite it not being one of Chan's best films, "at least it accomplishes the film's modest mission."
