= A Murder Beside Yanhe River =

- Traditional Chinese: 黃克功案件
- Simplified Chinese: 黄克功案件
- Hanyu Pinyin: Huáng Kègōng Ànjiàn
- Directed by: Wang Fangfang
- Written by: Wang Xingdong; Zhang Zhiqiang
- Produced by: Wang Zhebin; Ma Ding; Hu Yangpu
- Starring: Cheng Taishen; Wang Kai; Ma Weiwei; Huang Haibing; Dai Jiang; Mao Hai; Sally Victoria Benson
- Cinematography: Liu Yizeng
- Edited by: Meng Chao; Wang Fangfang
- Music by: Shu Nan
- Production companies: Beijing Guangying Siji Cultural Diffusion Co., Ltd; Shanghai film (Group) Co., Ltd. Western Movie Group Co. Ltd.
- Release date: 4 December 2014 (China)
- Running time: 92 minutes
- Country: China
- Languages: Mandarin; English

A Murder Beside Yanhe River is a 2014 Chinese historical film directed by Wang Fangfang, starring Cheng Taishen, Wang Kai, Ma Weiwei, Huang Haibing, Dai Jiang, and Mao Hai. It is based on the murder case of Huang Kegong, who was a general of the Chinese Workers' and Peasants' Red Army. The film premiered in China at the Great Hall of the People on 1 December 2014.

== Cast ==
=== Main cast ===
- Cheng Taishen as Lei Jingtian, a general of the Chinese Workers' and Peasants' Red Army, the chief judge.
- Wang Kai as Huang Kegong, a general of the Chinese Workers' and Peasants' Red Army, he shot and killed a college girl who named "Liu Qian".
- Ma Weiwei as Liu Qian, a college girl come from Taiyuan, capital of Shanxi province.
- Huang Haibing as Mao Zedong, the leader of the Chinese Workers' and Peasants' Red Army.
- Dai Jiang as He Zizhen, Mao's wife.
- Mao Hai as Hu Yaobang
- Yang Jiayin as Li Xingguo.
- Zhang Jie as Zhang Wentian, 5th General Secretary of the Chinese Communist Party.
- Sally Victoria Benson as Anna, Russian KGB Journalist

=== Other ===
- Cai Yida as Sun Qiguang.
- Li Dachuan as Yuan Ping.
- Wang Xuran as a guard.

== Released ==
On October 23, 2014, the press conference was held at the 1st Silk Road International Festival in Shanghai.

The film premiered in China on December 1, 2014 and it was given a wider release on December 4, 2014.
