= Cheng Yi (actor) =

Chinese actor and singer (born 1990)

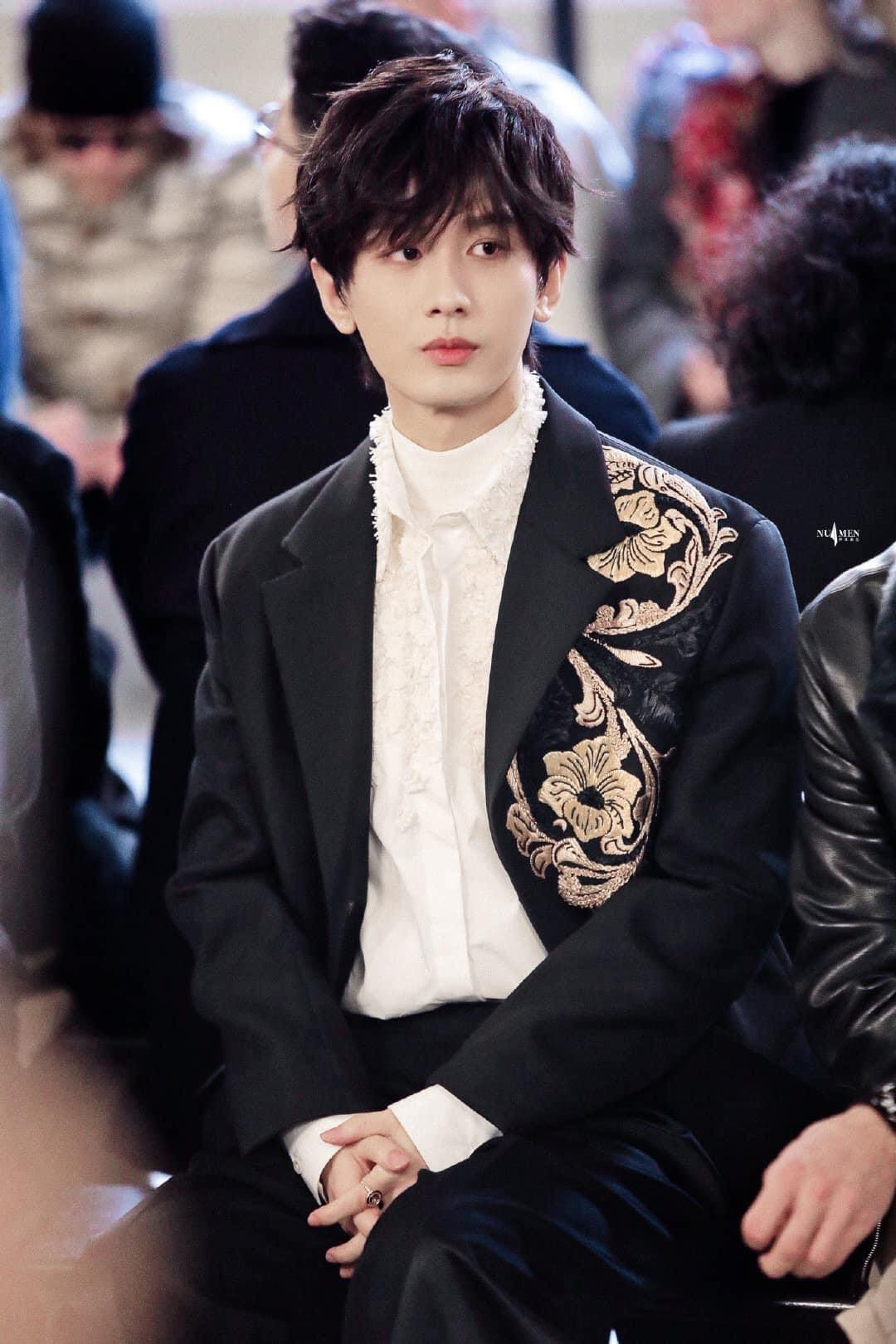
- Cheng in March 2023
- Born: Fu Shiqi (傅诗琪); May 17, 1990 (age 36); Huaihua, Hunan, China
- Education: Central Academy of Drama
- Occupation: Actor
- Years active: 2011–present
- Agent(s): H&R Century Pictures

Chinese name
- Chinese: 成毅
Transcriptions
Standard Mandarin
- Hanyu Pinyin: Chéng Yì

Fu Shiqi (Chinese: 傅诗淇; born May 17, 1990), known professionally by his stage name Cheng Yi (Chinese: 成毅), is a Chinese actor and singer. He made his television debut in Chinese television drama Beauty World (2011) and graduated from Central Academy of Drama in 2012. He first gained recognition for his role in Noble Aspirations (2016). He is also known for his roles as Yu Sifeng in Love and Redemption, Ying Yuan in Immortal Samsara, and Li Lianhua in Mysterious Lotus Casebook.

== Early life and education ==
Cheng Yi was born on May 17, 1990, in Huaihua, Hunan. Cheng graduated from the performance department of the Central Academy of Drama.

== Filmography ==
=== Film ===
Year	English title	Chinese title	Role	Notes/Ref.
2012	Haunting Love	詭愛	Su Yang	
2012	Too Late to Love You	原谅我，来不及爱你	Liu Xiaocheng	
2014	Inside the Girls	女生宿舍	Gao Munan	
2015	Impossible	不可思异	Tian Ye	
2018	The Big Rescue	营救汪星人	Erlang Shen	

=== Television series ===
Year	English title	Chinese title	Role	Network	Notes/Ref.
2011	Foster Mother	养母	Xiao Yuan	iQIYI	Guest role
2011	Beauty World	美人天下	Feng Xiaobao	Youku	
2012	Beauties of the Emperor	王的女人	Chai Tou (Ep.9)	Hunan TV	
2014	Miss Dong	懂小姐	Dong Xiaoye's boyfriend	Mango TV, Youku	
2016	Noble Aspirations	青云志	Lin Jing Yu	Hunan TV	
2019	The Lost Tomb II: Explore with the Note	盗墓笔记II: 怒海潜沙&秦岭神树	Zhang Qiling	Tencent	
2020	Love and Redemption	琉璃	Yu Sifeng	Mango TV, Youku	
2020	The Promise of Chang'an	长安诺	Xiao Chengxu	Tencent	
2021	Faith Makes Great	理想照耀中国	Guan Chong Gui [Our position] (Ep. 36)	Hunan TV	
2021	Stand by Me	与君歌	Qi Yan	Hunan TV, Mango TV	
2022	The Imperial Age	山河月明	Zhu Di (youth)	Beijing TV, Youku	
2022	Immortal Samsara	沉香如屑	Ying Yuan / Tang Zhou	Youku	
2022	Draw the Line	底线	Zhou Yi An	Hunan TV	
2023	Mysterious Lotus Casebook	莲花楼	Li Lian Hua	iQIYI	
2023	South Wind Knows	南风知我意	Fu Yunshen	Youku	
2024	Deep Lurk	迷局破之深潜	Yun Hongshen	iQIYI	
2025	The Journey of Legend	赴山海	Xiao Quishui / Xiao Mingming / Li Chen Zhou	iQIYI, Tencent	
2025	Sword and Beloved	涂山小红娘王权篇	Wangquan Fugui	iQIYI	
2025	The Vendetta of An	长安二十四计	Xie Huaian	Youku	
TBA	Hero Legends	英雄志	Lu Yun	CCTV-1, Tencent	
2026	Shou Huang	狩谎	Lin Yanting	Youku HarbourLight Films (HK)	

=== Television shows ===
Year	English title	Chinese title	Role	Network	Notes/Ref.
2014	Dear Refueling	亲爱的加油	Participant	Hunan TV	
2015	I Love Peach Blossom Spring	我爱桃花源	Participant	Anhui Television	
2016	Happy Camp	快乐大本营	Participant	Hunan TV	
2016	Grade One Season 3: Graduation	一年级·毕业季	Mentor	Hunan TV, Mango TV	
2016	Happy Camp	快乐大本营	Participant	Hunan TV	
2020	Happy Camp	快乐大本营	Participant	Hunan TV	
2020	Keep Running	奔跑吧	Participant	Zhejiang Television	
2021	Happy Camp	快乐大本营	Participant	Hunan TV	
2022	Hello Saturday	你好，星期六	Guest	Hunan TV	
2022	Workplace Newcomers: Forensic Season	初入职场的我们·法医季	Guest	Mango TV	
2022	Newcomers at Work	入职后的我们	Regular Member	Mango TV	
2023	Hello Saturday	你好，星期六	Guest	Hunan TV	
2023	Marvelous City	奇妙之城 第二季	Guest	Youku	
2024	Youth Travel 5	青春环游记第五季	Guest	Zhejiang TV	

== Discography ==
=== Singles ===
Year	English title	Chinese title	Album	Notes/Ref.
2012	"Rose Love Oath"	蔷薇恋誓	Stange Love OST	
2017	"If I love You Deeply"	如果我深爱着你	If I Love You Deeply	
2017	"Goodbye to the Past"	再见以前		
2019	"Living like Raging Wave"	生如狂澜	The Lost Tomb II: Explore with the Note OST	
2020	"Guard"	守	Love and Redemption OST	
2021	"Stay Together"	相守	Stand By Me OST	
2022	"Forget the River"	忘川	Immortal Samsara OST	

=== Other appearances ===
Title	Year	Album	Note(s)	Ref.
2020	"June Showers" (六月的雨)	Chinese Paladin (TV series) OST	Zhejiang Satellite TV 2021 New Year’s Eve Party	
2020	"Lover's Curse" (情人咒)	Love and Redemption OST	Zhejiang Satellite TV 2021 New Year’s Eve Party	
2020	"Heart and Hand" (心手相握)	Zhejiang Satellite TV 2021 New Year Eve Theme Song	Zhejiang Satellite TV 2021 New Year’s Eve Party	
2021	"Terrifying Afterlife" (后生可畏)	Collaboration with Zhang Xiao Han and Qi Qi	CCTV-May 1, 4 Youth Day Party	
2021	"Spring Ballad" (春天谣)	Duet with Bibi Zhou	CCTV New Year's Gala	
2023	"A Pot of Lotus Wine" (一壶莲花醉)	Mysterious Lotus Casebook OST	Double 11 Surprise Night Gala	
2023	"Under the Heaven" (《天下》)	Collaboration with Zeng Shunxi and Xiao Shun Yao	iQiyi Scream Night 2023	

== Awards and nominations ==
Year	Award	Category	Nominated work	Result	Ref.
2016	7th Donews Award Ceremony	Newcomer Award	Noble Aspirations	Won	
2020	Tencent Entertainment White Paper Awards	Star Power of the Year	—N/a	Nominated	
2022	GQ Men of the Year Awards 2022	Breakthrough Artist of the Year	—N/a	Won	
2023	19th Chinese American TV Awards	Outstanding Actor of the Year	Mysterious Lotus Casebook	Won	
2023	iQIYI Scream Night Awards 2023	Most Influential Actor Award	Mysterious Lotus Casebook	Won	
2024	Asian Television Awards 2024	Best Actor in a Leading Role	Mysterious Lotus Casebook	Unannounced	

== Philanthropy ==
In 2017, Cheng Yi became a love ambassador for People for the Ethical Treatment of Animals in Asia (PETA)'s adoption and collaborated with it to shoot a public service advertisement. In the same year, he participated in the International Fund for Animal Welfare (IFAW) joined hands with the "Your World Has Me" campaign launched by Shanghai International Green Film Week. In addition, he also joined hands with the Nature Conservancy (TNC) and the United Nations Development Program and filmed a public service announcement to save whale sharks.

In July 2021, Cheng Yi donated 500,000 yuan to the Henan Heavy Rain.

In January 2023, Cheng Yi served as the navel orange farmer-assisting ambassador for his hometown Chenxi County to help his hometown overcome poverty. In December, he donated 500,000 yuan to the disaster-stricken areas in Gansu.
