= Zhang Luyi =

Chinese actor and director

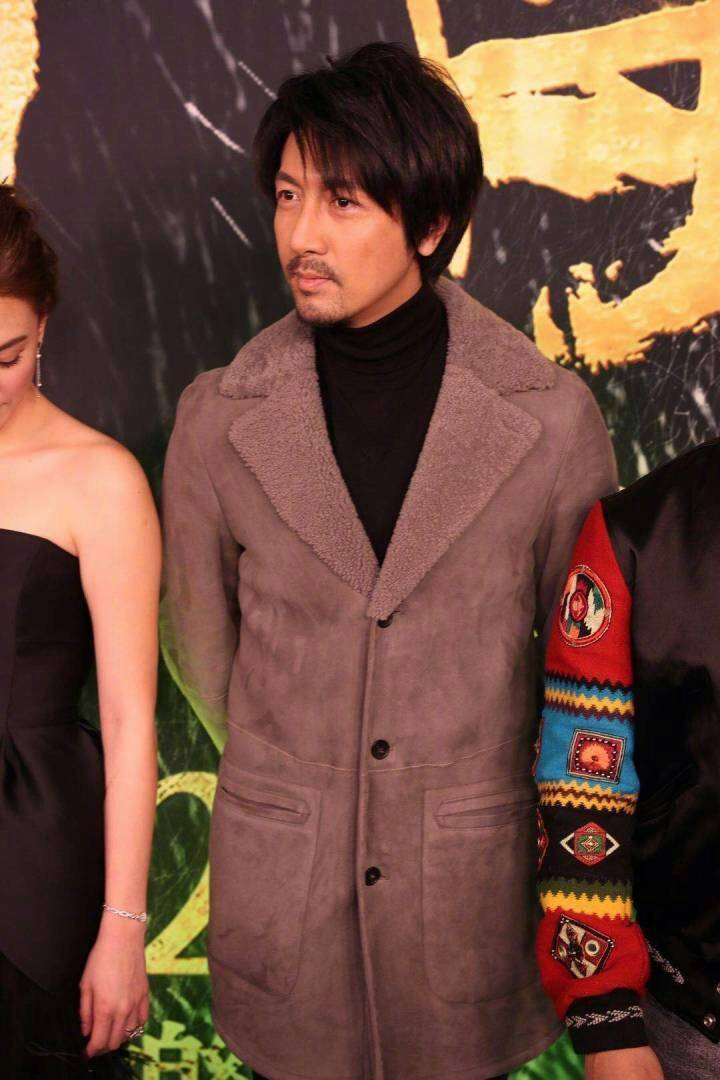
- Zhang in 2017
- Born: 7 June 1980 (age 46); Beijing, China
- Other name: Edward Zhang
- Education: Central Academy of Drama; Peking University
- Occupations: Actor, Director
- Years active: 2005–present
- Agent: Qianyi Times

Chinese name
- Traditional Chinese: 張魯一
- Simplified Chinese: 张鲁一
Transcriptions
Standard Mandarin
- Hanyu Pinyin: Zhāng Lǔyī

Zhang Luyi (born 7 June 1980), also known as Edward Zhang, is a Chinese actor and director.

== Background and career ==
Zhang first studied film direction at the Central Academy of Drama in Beijing, before entering Peking University where he obtained a master's degree. He had a few minor roles in film and television before gaining attention for his role in a TV production The Red in 2014. He has since played major parts in a number of films and television series, including The Devotion of Suspect X, Love Me if You Dare, and Sparrow.

== Filmography ==
=== Film ===
Year	English title	Chinese title	Role	Notes
2012		爱·璀璨	Cai Qing	Short film
2013	The Chef, the Actor, the Scoundrel	厨子戏子痞子	Bai Chuan	
2014	The Golden Era	黄金时代	Mao Dun	
2014	Love on the Cloud	微爱之渐入佳境	Huang Xiaogua	
2016	Mr. Six	老炮儿	Police	Cameo; Scenes deleted in Mainland version
2017	The Devotion of Suspect X	嫌疑人X的献身	Shi Hong	
2017	The Legend of the Cat Demon	妖猫传	Emperor Xuanzong of Tang	
2021	Yanagawa	漫长的告白	Li Dong	

=== Television series ===
Year	English title	Chinese title	Role	Notes
2007		玉卿嫂	Liu Qichang	
2013	Mother will Marry	娘要嫁人	Dai Shiliang	
2013	Troubled Times Three Brothers	火线三兄弟	Gao Mu	
2013	Woman Gang	女人帮	Ye Ping	
2014	A Servant of Two Masters	一仆二主	Qi Jianjun	
2014	The Red	红色	Xu Tian	
2014	Negotiations Sweetheart	谈判冤家	Li Miao	
2014	The King of Guns	绝地枪王	Qianyuan Jiayan	
2015	Immediately the World	马上天下	Chen Qiushi	
2015	Love Me If You Dare	他来了，请闭眼	Xie Han	
2015	Pretty Wife	我的老婆大人是八零后	Yu Zhiheng	
2015	Tumultuous Times Scholar	乱世书香	Xu Shucheng	
2016	We Are The Best Ten Years	我们最美好的十年	Lawyer Zhang	Cameo
2016	The Battle of Dawn	黎明之战	Yue Xiaobai	
2016	Eastern Battlefield	东方战场	Bo Yi	
2016	The Mystic Nine	老九门	Wu Laogou	
2016	Novoland: Castle in the Sky	九州·天空城	Ji Gou	
2016	Sparrow	麻雀	Bi Zhongliang	
2018	Patriot	爱国者	Song Yanqiao	
2019	Second Time It's a Charm	第二次也很美	Xu Lang	
2019	The Best Partner	精英律师		Cameo
2020	New World	新世界	Tie Lin	
TBA	Beauty from Heart	这个世界不看脸	Lian Sheng	
TBA	Blossoms in Dream	花开如梦	Zou Jie	
TBA	Loving the Earth	燃情大地	Ma Zhongqiu	
TBA	River Sunset	长河落日	Wumu Yilang	
2020	The Qin Empire 4	大秦帝国之天下	Qin Shi Huang	
2023	Three-Body	三体	Wang Miao	
2025	Justifiable Defense	正当防卫	Duan Hongshan	

== Awards and nominations ==
Year	Award	Category	Nominated work	Result	Ref.
2017	4th The Actors of China Award Ceremony	Best Actor (Sapphire)	—N/a	Won	
2020	26th Shanghai Television Festival	Best Supporting Actor	The New World	Nominated	
