= Darren Wang =

Taiwanese actor

Wang Talu
- 王大陸
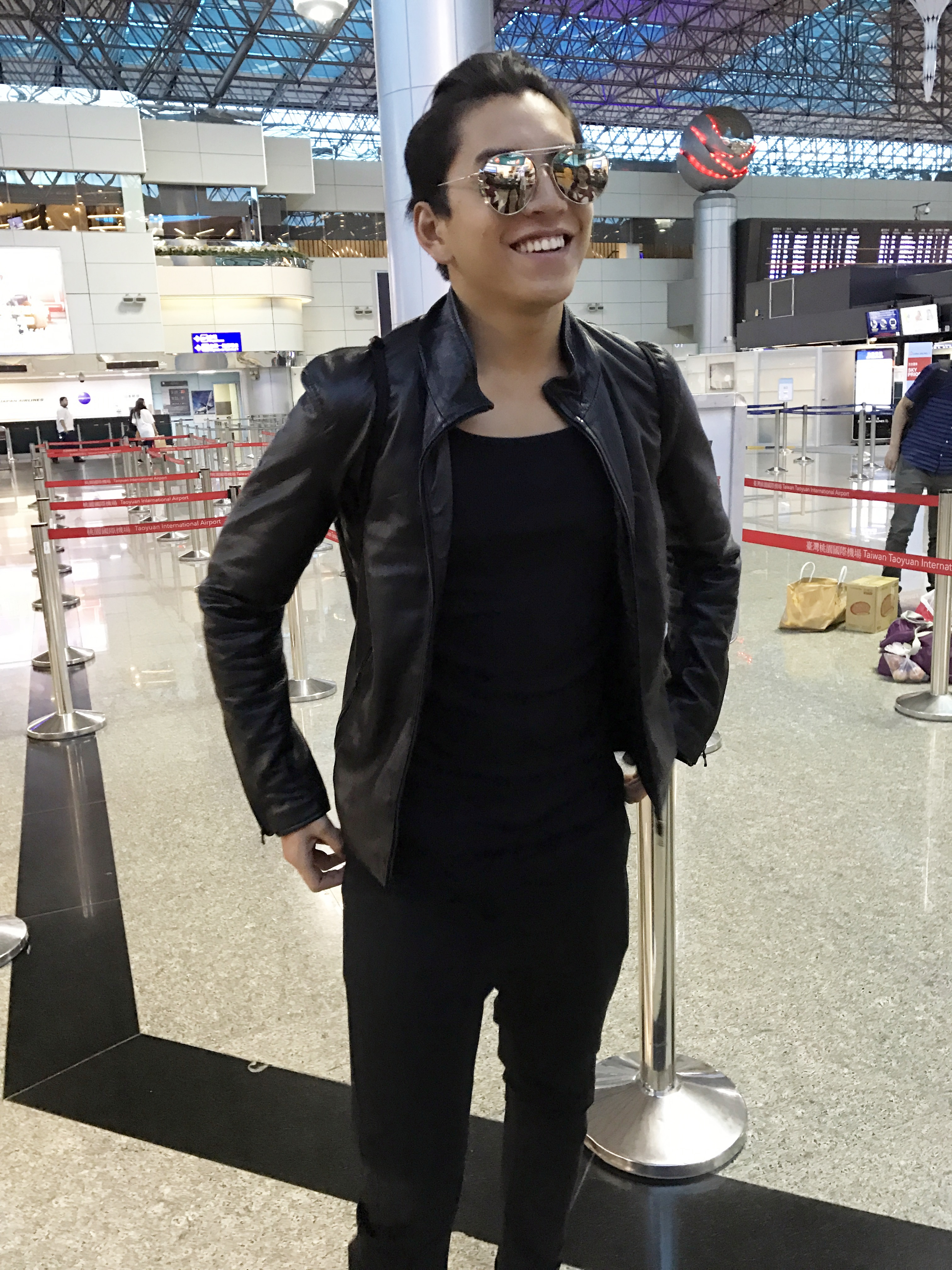
- Wang in 2016
- Born: May 29, 1991 (age 35); Taipei, Taiwan
- Other names: Darren Wang; Dalu Wang; Wang Dalu; Talu Wang
- Education: Toko University
- Occupation: Actor
- Years active: 2008–2025

Chinese name
- Traditional Chinese: 王大陸
- Simplified Chinese: 王大陆
Transcriptions
Standard Mandarin
- Hanyu Pinyin: Wáng Dàlù
Southern Min
- Hokkien POJ: Ông Tāi-lio̍k

Darren Wang Talu (Chinese: 王大陸; pinyin: Wáng Dàlù; Pe̍h-ōe-jī: Ông Tāi-lio̍k; born May 29, 1991) is a Taiwanese actor. He is best known for his breakout role as Hsu Tai-yu in the coming-of-age film, Our Times.

== Career ==
Wang made his debut in the 2008 drama series Mysterious Incredible Terminator, and went on to make his big-screen bow in the 2010 film In Case of Love. He appeared in the hit high school romance film Our Times in 2015, after which he was crowned GQ's Man of the Year. He has contributed a number of songs to the soundtracks of films he starred in and appeared in The Last Wish (2019).

In 2019, Wang starred as the male lead in the romance film Fall in Love at First Kiss, a remake of the Taiwanese series of the same name.

In February 2025, Wang was among ten people embroiled in a draft dodging scandal. It was alleged that he faked having a heart condition to get an exemption from the mandatory conscription service in Taiwan. On April 22, 2026, Wang was sentenced to six months’ jail for unlawfully obtaining personal data in Taiwan in relation to the draft dodging scandal.

In March 2025, Wang was investigated by Taiwanese authorities for an alleged hiring of thugs to assault on an Uber driver after he was dissatisfied with the quality of the car sent to pick him up at the airport.

Due to legal issues, unreleased productions involving Wang were being held in limbo.

== Filmography ==
=== Film ===
Year	English title	Chinese title	Role	Notes
2010	In Case of Love	街角的小王子	Lu Lu	
2012	Love's Two Faces	愛情的兩張臉	Xiao Jie	
2014	A Choo	打噴嚏	Ye Jianhan	
2014	7 Love Design	相愛的七種設計	Chen Hongyi	
2015	Our Times	我的少女時代	Hsu Taiyu	
2016	Suddenly Seventeen	28歲未成年	Yan Yan	
2016	Railroad Tigers	鐵道飛虎	Da Guo	
2016	Yo-Kai Watch Movie: It's the Secret of Birth, Meow!	妖怪手錶電影版：誕生的秘密喵！	Tianye Jingcang	Voice-dubbed
2017	10,000 Miles	一萬公里的約定	Sean Fang	
2017	Legend of the Naga Pearls	鮫珠傳	Ni Kongkong	
2018	A Better Tomorrow 2018	英雄本色2018	Ma Ke	
2019	Fall in Love at First Kiss	一吻定情	Jiang Zhishu	
2019	The Rookies	素人特攻	Zhao Feng	
2019	The Last Wish	小小的願望	Xu Hao	
2019	Super Me	超級的我	Sang Yu	
2023	No More Bets	孤注一擲	Gu Tian Zhi	
2026	Fuxi: Joy in Four Chapters	腹喜		

=== Television series ===
Year	English title	Chinese title	Role	Network	Notes
2008	Mysterious Incredible Terminator	霹靂MIT	Yang Shengkai	FTV	Cameo, Episode 8
2010	Gloomy Salad Days	死神少女	Xiao Hai	PTS	Cameo, Episode 15–16
2010	Channel-X	國民英雄	Gu Yongen	TTV	Cameo, Episode 8
2017	Candle in the Tomb: Mu Ye Gui Shi	鬼吹燈之牧野詭事	Hu Tian	iQiyi	
2020	The Wolf	狼殿下	Zhu Youwen	iQiyi, Tencent, Youku	
	Quiet Among Disquiet	安静			

=== Variety and reality show ===
Year	English title	Chinese title	Role	Network	Notes
2017	Give Me Five	高能少年团	Cast member	Zhejiang Television	
2020	Produce Camp 2020	创造营2020	Guest appearance	Tencent Video	
2022	Call Me by Fire (season 2)	披荊斬棘	Participant	Mango TV	
2024	Ai's Kitchen	艾嘉食堂	Himself / Bartender	SET Metro / Netflix Asia	

== Discography ==
Year	English title	Chinese title	Album	Notes
2016	"Big Brother"	大哥	Railroad Tigers OST	with Wang Kai, Wu Yonglun & Sang Ping
2016	"Playing My Beloved Folk Lute"	弹起我心爱的土琵琶	Railroad Tigers OST	with Wang Kai, Wu Yonglun & Sang Ping
2017	"Proud Youths"	骄傲的少年	Give Me Five OST	with Zhang Yishan, Wang Junkai, Dong Zijian & Liu Haoran
2019	"We Won't Be Sad in the End"	最后不会有悲伤	The Last Wish OST	with Peng Yuchang & Wei Daxun

== Awards and nominations ==
Year	Award	Category	Nominated work	Result	Ref.
2015	GQ Man of the Year Awards	Fashion Award	—N/a	Won	
2015	4th iQiyi All-Star Carnival	Newcomer Film Award	Our Times	Won	
2016	20th China Music Awards	Popular Star Award – Film	Our Times	Won	
2016	18th Taipei Film Awards	Best Actor	Our Times	Nominated	
2016	5th APAN Star Awards	Rising Star Award	—N/a	Won	
2017	2nd Fashion Up Awards	Popularity Award – Male	—N/a	Won	
2017	Men's UNO YOUNG Red Awards	Best Actor	—N/a	Won	
2017	GQ Man of the Year Awards	Fashionista of the Year	—N/a	Won	
2018	4th Jackie Chan Action Movie Awards	Best New Actor In Action	A Better Tomorrow 2018	Nominated	
2019	11th Macau International Movie Festival	Best Supporting Actor	The Last Wish	Nominated	
