= Ma Tianyu =

Chinese singer and actor (born 1986)

- 马天宇
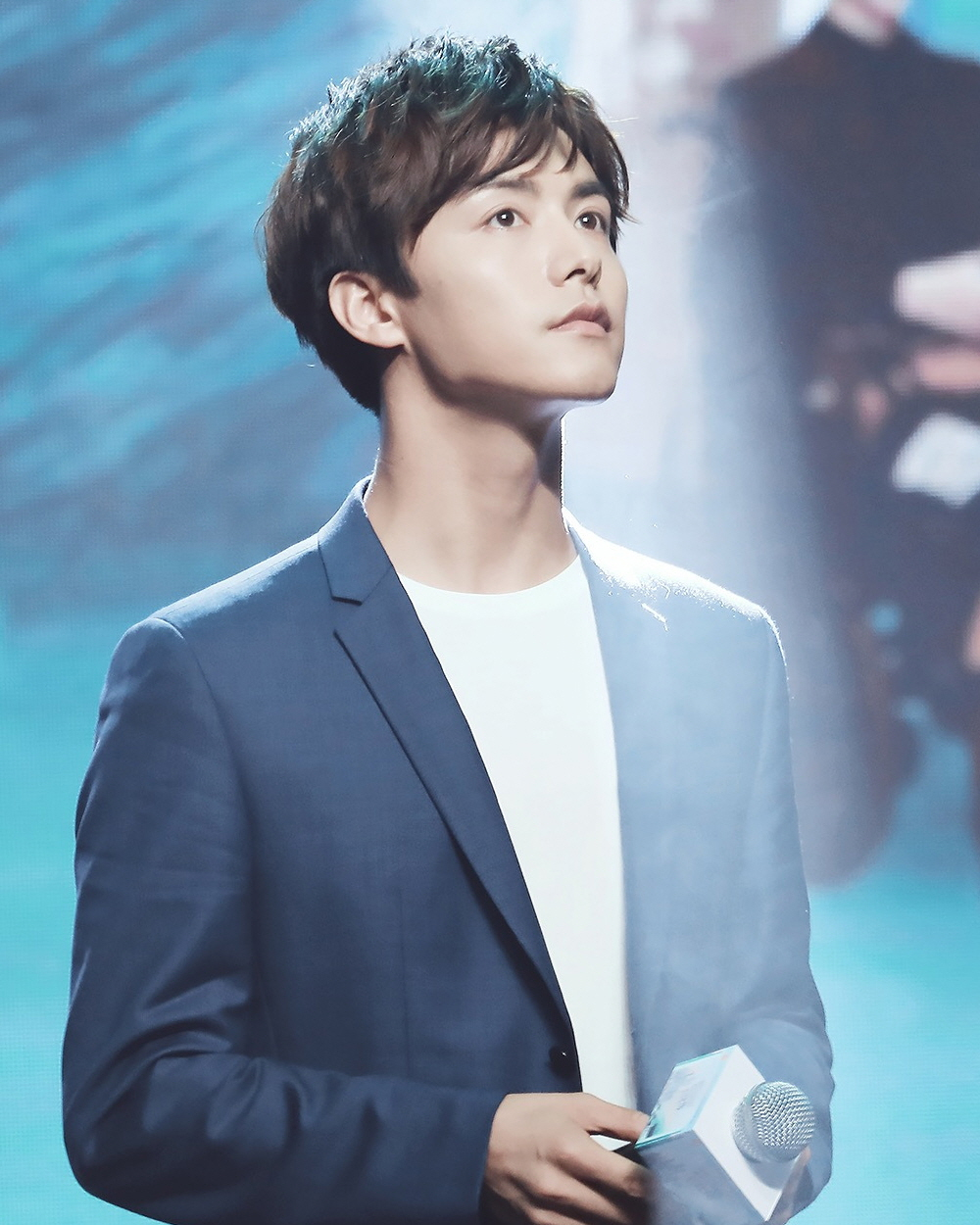
- Ma in 2018
- Born: 12 July 1986 (age 40); Dezhou, Shandong, China
- Education: Beijing Film Academy
- Occupations: Actor; singer
- Years active: 2006–present
- Agent: Ma Tian Yu Studio (under Summer Star 盛夏星空)
- Height: 180 cm (5 ft 11 in)
- Musical career
- Also known as: Ray Ma
- Genre: Mandopop
- Instrument: Vocals
- Website: tianyu.tv

Ma Tianyu (Chinese: 马天宇; pinyin: Mǎ Tiānyǔ; born 12 July 1986), also known as Ray Ma, is a Chinese singer and actor. He graduated from the Beijing Film Academy.

== Career ==
=== Early life ===
Ma was born to an ethnic Hui family in Wucheng county, Dezhou, Shandong, China. At the age of 5, his mother died of suicide, and subsequently, his father left the family due to debts. Ma, along with his two sisters, went on to live with their elderly grandparents.

To support his family, at the age of 16, Ma relocated to Beijing, where he began working in various capacities. During his time as a bartender in Beijing, he encountered individuals associated with the entertainment industry who recognized his potential. They suggested that he pursue a career as an actor and advised him to undertake the entrance examination for the Beijing Film Academy.

In the absence of a clear career path, Ma followed the suggestion. Grappling with shyness during the auditions, Ma decided to participate in the talent competition My Hero (2006) to bolster his self-confidence.

=== 2006–2008: Debut as a singer ===
In 2006, Ma became the regional champion for the Wuhan area and came sixth in the final round of My Hero; he was elected the most popular contestant.

In 2007, Ma released his first album Beautiful Light. The album was well-received, and topped the Asia Music Chart for Chinese albums. Ma won two newcomer awards at the China Billboard Award Ceremony, and Most Popular Singer awards at the 5th Southeast Music Chart Awards and 11th Tencent Star Award Ceremony. "The Death of Gentleness" from the album was also chosen as one of the Top Ten Songs of the Year.

=== 2009–2013: Acting debut and breakthrough ===
Ma made his acting debut in the film Evening of Roses, based on a novel of the same name by Cai Zhiheng. In 2010, he played the character Jia Baoyu in the historical television series The Legend of Daiyu.

Ma first gained public attention in 2011 when he starred in wuxia drama The Vigilantes in Masks alongside Wallace Huo and Cecilia Liu. He won the Breakthrough Actor award at the 2011 Youku Television Index Awards. He then starred in Hunan TV's family drama Treasure Mother Treasure Girl (2012), which topped viewership ratings. The same year, he had a guest starring role in Xuan-Yuan Sword: Scar of Sky, which was well received by the audience.

In 2013, Ma starred in the comedy film, The Cosplayers, and was chosen as the Most Promising Film Actor for his performance.

=== 2014–present: Rising popularity ===
Ma gained an increase in popularity after starring in the wuxia drama Young Sherlock (2014). His portrayal of the elegant and dandy Wang Yuanfang was critically praised. He continued his success streak with dual roles in Swords of Legends (2014), which was a huge commercial success. The same year he released a single titled "Narcissus". The song received positive reviews from both the media and fans and topped various music charts in China.

In 2015, Ma joined the cast of travel-reality show Sisters Over Flowers, and sung the theme song titled "Let Time Rewind in the Wind" for the show. The same year, he starred in the comedy film Surprise. The film broke a million admissions and Ma received acclaim for his dynamic portrayal of a "tragic hero". Ma received the "Outstanding Male Artist" award at the Esquire Man at His Best Award.

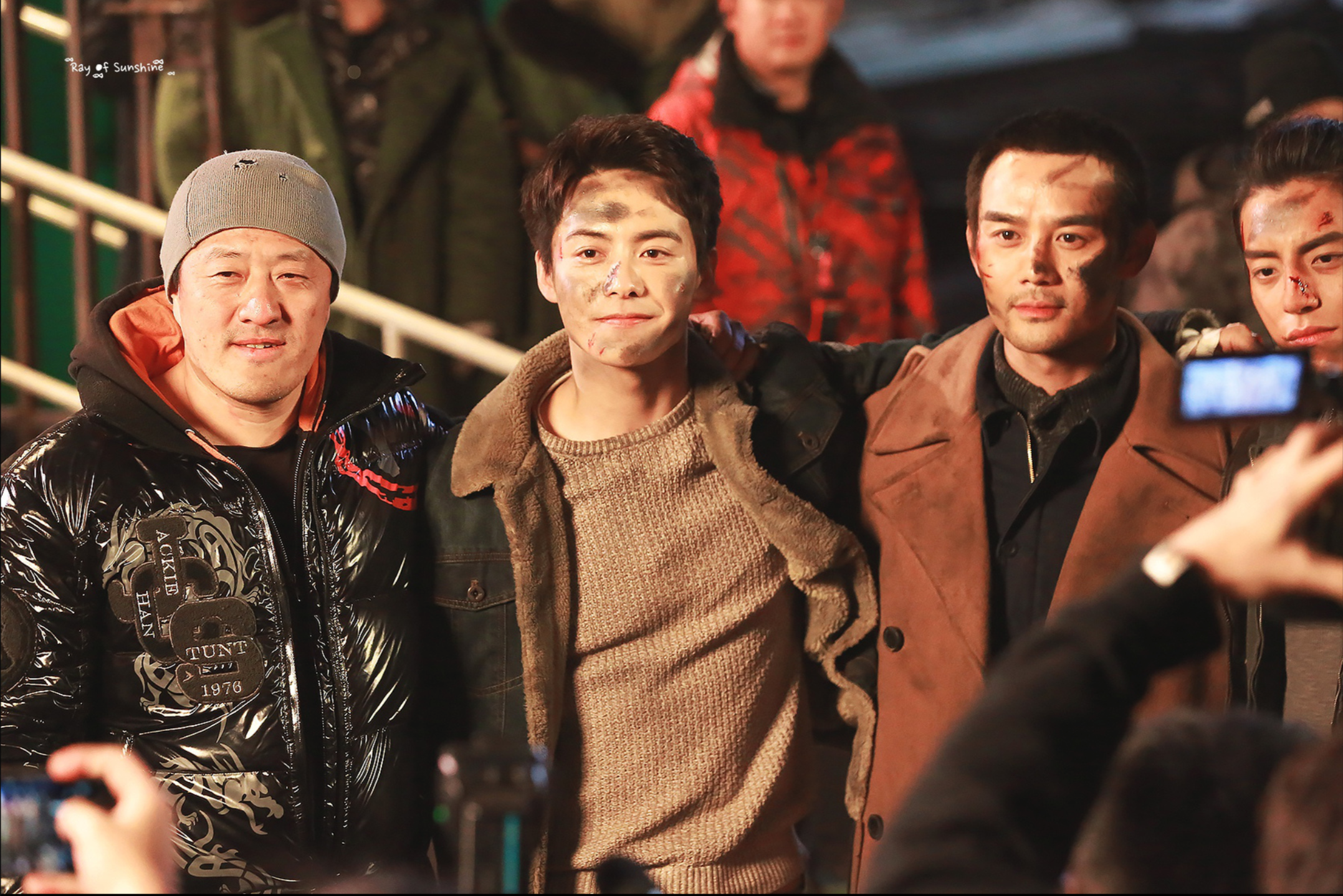
Ma on film set of A Better Tomorrow 2018 with co-stars in 2017.

In 2016, Ma starred in the epic fantasy drama Ice Fantasy, based on Guo Jingming's best-selling novel City of Fantasy, playing the role of the silent and mysterious ice prince, Ying Kongshi. He became known to wider international audience following the airing of the drama. The same year, he released the album Flower in Hand to celebrate his 10th anniversary since debut.

In 2017, Ma ranked 95th on Forbes China Celebrity 100 list.

In 2018, Ma starred in the crime action film A Better Tomorrow 2018 by Ding Sheng. The same year, he starred in the television series historical drama Secret of the Three Kingdoms, playing Liu Xie; and romance melodrama All Out of Love.

In 2019, Ma starred in romance melodrama River Flows To You alongside Zheng Shuang, and romance environmental drama My Mowgli Boy alongside actress Yang Zi.

== Discography ==
=== Albums ===
Year	English title	Chinese title
2007	Beautiful Light	宇光十色
2008	Fly	飞
2009	The Longest Night in Shanghai	夜上海
2010	Bright Moonlight	月光晴朗
2010	Confidence	自言自宇
2013	Out of the World	世界之外
2016	Flower in Hand	手花

=== Singles ===
Year	English title	Chinese title
2006	"Only Missing Autumn"	只欠秋天
2007	"Happy Story"	快乐童话
2007	"We Are Ready"	我们准备好了
2008	"One World One Dream"	世界的梦想
2008	"Believe in Love"	相信爱
2008	"Give You My Energy"	给你我的力量
2011	"Save the World"	拯救世界
2014	"Narcissus"	纳西索斯

=== Soundtracks and promotional songs ===
Year	English title	Chinese title	Album
2014	"Falling Flowers"	落花	Young Sherlock OST
2014	"Orchid Bell Song"	兰铃曲	Swords of Legends OST
2015	"Let Time Rewind in the Wind"	让时光在微风中倒流	Sister Over Flowers OST
2015	"The Things We Want to Do and Accomplish"	想到和做到的	Kung Fu Mother-in-Law OST
2016	"Love As Sakura"	愛如櫻	Ice Fantasy OST
2016	"Whose"	谁	Edge of Happiness OST
2016	"Summer"	念夏	Edge of Happiness OST
2018	"The Everlasting"	生生不息	All Out of Love OST
2019	"Loving La Vie En Rose"	—N/a	River Flows To You OST
2019	"My Motherland and I"	我和我的祖国	—N/a

=== Other appearances ===
Year	English title	Chinese title	Notes/Ref.
2017	"Bringing Moonlight on the Road	带上月光上路	Performance for CCTV Spring Gala

== Filmography ==
=== Film ===
Year	English title	Chinese title	Role	Notes/Ref.
2006	Curse of the Golden Flower	满城尽带黄金甲	Medicine boy	Support Role
2009	Evening of Roses	夜玫瑰	Lan Heyan	Support Role
2010	Illusion Apartment	异度公寓	Meng Yifan	
2011	East Meets West	东成西就 2011		Cameo
2013	The Cosplayers	百万爱情宝贝	Ye Chong	
2015	Love Without Distance	土豪520	Yu Haiyan	
2015	Surprise	万万没想到	Mu Rongbai	
2015	The Little Prince	小王子	Fox	Voice-dubbed
2017	The Founding of an Army	建军大业	Lin Biao	Support Role
2018	A Better Tomorrow 2018	英雄本色4	Zhou Chao	
2019	Mao Zedong 1949	决胜时刻	War correspondent	Support Role
2021	1921		Li Xian Gen	Support Role
2022	Ordinary Hero	平凡英雄	Song Hui	Cameo

=== Television series ===
Year	English title	Chinese title	Role	Notes/Ref.
2008	You Are My Dream	你是我的梦	Ma Yu	Cameo
2010	The Legend of Daiyu	黛玉传	Jia Baoyu	
2010	The Vigilantes in Masks	怪侠一枝梅	He Xiaomei	
2011	Scarlet Heart	步步惊心	Huang Di	Cameo
2012	Precious Mother, Precious Girl	宝贝妈妈宝贝女	Zhang Hanzhe	
2012	Xuan-Yuan Sword: Scar of Sky	轩辕剑:天之痕	Lü Chengzhi	Support Role
2013	Romantic Heroes of the Tang Dynasty	唐朝浪漫英雄	Fei Ying	Cameo
2013	Hot Mom Qiao Da	辣妈俏爸	Yuan Zhida	
2013	Longmen Express	龙门镖局	Qingdong	Cameo
2014	Lady's House	淑女之家	Su Zhiwen	
2014	Young Sherlock	少年神探狄仁杰	Wang Yuanfang	
2014	Swords of Legends	古剑奇谭	Fang Lansheng	Support Role
2014	Romantic Kitchen	浪漫满厨	Mi Qing	
2014	Sunshine in Me	骄阳似我	Singer	Cameo
2015	In the Dream to Find the Answer	四手妙弹	Wen Shaohui	Support Role
2015	The Gossip Girl	米粒向前冲	Meng Yan	
2015	Time To Love	抓緊時間愛	Wen Jun	Support Role
2015	Kung Fu Mother-in-Law	功夫婆媳	Huang Lezong	
2016	Edge of Happiness	缘来幸福	He Mu	
2016	Singing All Along	秀麗江山之長歌行	Yan Ziling	Support Role
2016	By Marriage to Remember	毛丫丫被婚记	Xiang Hui	Special appearance
2016	Ice Fantasy	幻城	Ying Kongshi / Li Tianjin	
2016	Beauty Private Kitchen	美人私房菜	Li Ma	
2017	Ice Fantasy Destiny	幻城凡世	Ma Tianci / Ying Kongshi	
2018	Secret of the Three Kingdoms	三国机密	Liu Xie / Liu Ping	
2018	All Out of Love	凉生，我们可不可以不忧伤	Liang Sheng	
2018	The Best Meeting	最好的遇见	Xiang Hui	
2019	Scouring Marriage	亲爱的婚姻	Li Xiaojun	
2019	River Flows To You	流淌的美好时光	Qi Ming	
2019	My Mowgli Boy	我的莫格利男孩	Mo Ge Li / Xia Ye / Wolf	
2020	Heroes in Harm’s Way	最美逆行者	Tu Ziqiao	
2020	Unbending Will	石头开花	Dai Zhiqiang	
2021	Humans	你好，安怡	Li Yao	
2023	Divine Destiny	尘缘	Ji Ruo Chen	
2024	The Happy Seven in Changan	喜卷长安城	Shang Guan Gu Chuan	
2025	Legend of The Female General	锦月如歌	Xiao Jing	

=== Variety show ===
Year	English title	Chinese title	Role	Notes/Ref.
2015	Sisters Over Flowers	花样姐姐	Cast member	
2016	Let Go of My Baby Season 1	放开我北鼻	Cast member	
2017	Let Go of My Baby Season 2	放开我北鼻	Cast member	
2019	We Grew Up	我们长大了	Cast member	
2019	The Inn	亲爱的·客栈	Cast member	
2021	The Wonderful Life	生活真美好	Cast member	

== Awards and nominations ==
Year	Awards	Category	Nominated work	Result	Ref.
2007	1st Star Style Awards	Top Ten Fashion Idol	—N/a	Won	
2007	1st Baidu Entertainment Hot Point	Top Ten Songs	"The Death of Gentleness"	Won	
2007	1st Baidu Entertainment Hot Point	Popular Music Video Award	"The Death of Gentleness"	Won	
2007	11th "Qicai" Award Ceremony	Top Ten Songs	"The Death of Gentleness"	Won	
2007	11th "Qicai" Award Ceremony	Most Popular Male Singer	—N/a	Won	
2007	6th China Gold Record Award	Newcomer Award	—N/a	Nominated	
2007	11th Tencent Star Award Ceremony	Most Popular Male Singer	—N/a	Won	
2007	China Billboard Award Ceremony	Most Promising Newcomer	—N/a	Won	
2007	China Billboard Award Ceremony	Best Selling New Album	Beautiful Light	Won	
2007	7th China Original Song Award	Best-selling Album	Beautiful Light	Won	
2007	5th Southeast Music Chart Awards	Most Popular Singer	—N/a	Won	
2007	5th Southeast Music Chart Awards	Top Ten Songs	"The Death of Gentleness"	Won	
2007	Music Radio China Top Chart Awards	Top Broadcast Song of the Year	"The Death of Gentleness"	Won	
2008	7th 9+2 Music Pioneer Awards	Top Ten Songs	"The Death of Gentleness"	Won	
2008	7th 9+2 Music Pioneer Awards	Newcomer of the Year (Mainland)	—N/a	Won	
2008	4th Sina Internet TV Festival	Popular Blogger Award	—N/a	Won	
2008	4th Sina Internet TV Festival	Newcomer of the Year	—N/a	Nominated	
2008	12th "Qicai" Award Ceremony	Best Male Singer	"Fly"	Won	
2008	12th "Qicai" Award Ceremony	Top Ten Songs	"Still Together"	Won	
2008	12th "Qicai" Award Ceremony	Best Music Video	"Green Clothes"	Won	
2008	Music Radio China Top Chart Awards	Top Broadcast Song of the Year	"Green Clothes"	Won	
2009	Music Radio China Top Chart Awards	Song of the Year	"Green Clothes"	Won	
2009	Music Radio China Top Chart Awards	Recommended Album	Fly	Won	
2009	2nd Baidu Entertainment Hot Point	Top Ten Songs	"Still Together"	Won	
2011	11th 9+2 Music Pioneer Awards	Musical Improvement Award	—N/a	Won	
2011	11th 9+2 Music Pioneer Awards	Trend Singer of the Year	"My Dear, Where Are You?"	Won	
2011	1st Youku Television Index Awards	Best Breakthrough Actor	The Vigilantes in Masks	Won	
2011	1st Fashion New Power Awards	Fashion Artist Award	—N/a	Won	
2014	4th LeTV Movie and Drama Awards	Most Promising Film Actor	The Cosplayers	Won	
2014	2nd Youku Young Choice Awards	All-Rounded Artist Award	—N/a	Won	
2014	11th Man at His Best Awards	Fashion Male Artist Award	—N/a	Won	
2015	12th Man at His Best Awards	Outstanding Mainland Artist	—N/a	Won	
2016	1st KuGou Music Awards	Most Popular Digital Album	Flower in Hand	Won	
2016	1st KuGou Music Awards	Platinum Artist Award	Flower in Hand	Won	
2016	2nd OK! Fashion Attitude Awards	Influential Male Celebrity	—N/a	Won	
2016	Baidu Entertainment Awards	Person of the Year	—N/a	Won	
2017	Weibo Awards Ceremony	Breakthrough Actor	—N/a	Won	
2017	11th Writers Rich List	Best-Selling Author	Ray Me	Won	
2018	34th Hundred Flowers Awards	Best Supporting Actor	The Founding of an Army	Nominated	
2018	15th Esquire Man at His Best Awards	Fashion Artist Award	—N/a	Won	
2018	15th China Philanthropist List	Charity Star of the Year	—N/a	Won	
2019	Golden Bud – The Fourth Network Film And Television Festival	Best Actor	River Flows To You, My Mowgli Boy	Nominated	
