= A Better Tomorrow 2018 =

2018 Chinese action film

- Film poster
- Directed by: Ding Sheng
- Screenplay by: Ding Sheng; Xu Yang
- Story by: Jia Zhijie
- Produced by: Zhang Miao; Lu Qian; Joe Tam; Chen Wei
- Starring: Wang Kai; Ma Tianyu; Wang Talu; Yu Ailei; Lam Suet; Wu Yue
- Cinematography: Ding Yu
- Edited by: Ding Sheng
- Music by: Lao Zi; Dou Peng
- Production companies: Beijing Jingxi Culture & Tourism Co., Ltd.; Chongqing Shuimu Chengde Capital L.P.; Beijing Sparkle Roll Media Corporation; CoolBoy (Shanghai) Culture Communication Co., Ltd.
- Distributed by: Beijing Jingxi Tourism Development Co. Ltd.; Huoerguosi Enlight Media
- Release date: 18 January 2018 (China)
- Running time: 114 minutes
- Country: China
- Language: Mandarin
- Box office: US$10.1 million

A Better Tomorrow 2018 (Chinese: 英雄本色2018), is a Chinese action film directed by Ding Sheng and starring Wang Kai, Ma Tianyu, Wang Talu, Yu Ailei, Lam Suet and Wu Yue. In this remake of John Woo's 1986 classic, director Ding Sheng delivers a similar story but with a different setting. Filming took place in a seaside location in the Northern Chinese city of Qingdao as well as in Japan.

The film was invited to be the closing film at the CinemAsia Film Festival in Netherlands on March 11, 2018. Also, the film had screenings at Osaka Asian Film Festival in Japan, Newcastle International Film Festival in United Kingdom, and Far East Film Festival in Italy.

A Better Tomorrow 2018 premiered in China on January 18, 2018.

== Synopsis ==
Zhou Kai (Wang Kai) heads a smuggling ring that ships goods from a coastal Chinese city to Japan. He has a younger brother, idealistic rookie cop Zhou Chao (Ma Tianyu), who knows nothing about his shady dealings. When Kai's refusal to turn to narcotics creates a rift in the team, the insidious Rubberband sets Kai up on a deal that ends with his arrest. Three years later, Kai is released from prison and tries to live a quiet, humble life with his former partner-in-crime, Mark (Wang Talu). However, the unforgiving eyes of his brother and society at large stop him at every step. When Kai's former criminal associates force Kai to return to the game, Kai, Mark and Chao are put on a collision path that will end in violence.

== Cast ==
- Wang Kai as Zhou Kai, a member of a smuggling ring who got framed by his own partners and sent to prison. After doing his time, he seeks to live a straight life, but dangers from his past keep haunting him.
- Ma Tianyu as Zhou Chao, a police officer who has great respect for his older brother Chou Kai, though he never knew of his life in crime.
- Wang Talu as Ma Ke, a member of a smuggling group and Kai's trusty right-hand man. A simple-minded, passionate and loyal sworn brother.
- Yu Ailei as Cang, the son of Boss Ha.
- Lam Suet as Ha, the boss of a smuggling group.
- Wu Yue as Pi Jin, a member of a smuggling group.
- Li Mincheng as Guo Dui, drug-squad chief.
- Li Meng as Mei Lin, Zhou Kai's girl friend.
- Zhang Yishang as Lu Lu, Zhou Chao's girl friend.
- Yûta Nakano as Okamura, the Japanese Yakuza boss.
- Shi Liang as Zhou Kai and Zhou Chou's father.
- Jiang Peiyao as Yang Yang, Ma Ke's girl friend.
- Han Han as the car driver.
- Ning Hao as the drinker in Old Ma Bar.
- Eric Tsang as the prisoner D8145.
- Guo Xiaoran as the boat captain.
- Song Ge as Song, the police chief.
- Brian Huang as Ma Ke's Taiwanese friend.
- Ding Sheng as the taxi driver.

== Music ==
The film score was written and composed by Lao Zi and Dou Peng, and performed by China National Symphony Orchestra and International Master Philharmonic Orchestra.

== Release ==
The film premiered in China on January 18, 2018. The following are the release dates for each region.

Released Date	Region	Title	Distributor(s)
January 18, 2018	China	英雄本色 2018	Beijing Jingxi Tourism Development Co. Ltd. Huoerguosi Enlight Media
January 18, 2018	Singapore	A Better Tomorrow 2018	Clover Films
January 19, 2018	Canada	A Better Tomorrow 2018	Asia Releasing; H Collective
January 19, 2018	United States	A Better Tomorrow 2018	Asia Releasing; H Collective
January 25, 2018	Australia	A Better Tomorrow 2018	China Lion Film Distribution
January 25, 2018	New Zealand	A Better Tomorrow 2018	China Lion Film Distribution
January 26, 2018	Vietnam	Bản Sắc Anh Hùng 2018	Beta Media
January 31, 2018	Philippines	A Better Tomorrow 2018	ABS-CBN Film Productions
February 1, 2018	Fiji	A Better Tomorrow 2018	Asia Releasing; H Collective
February 1, 2018	Hong Kong	英雄本色 2018	China 3D Digital Distribution
February 28, 2018	Taiwan	英雄本色 2018	Deepjoy Picture
March 22, 2018	South Korea	영웅본색 4	Kidarient Corp.
April 19, 2018	Thailand	โหดเลวดี 2018	Hollywood (Thailand) Co., LTD.

The following are the released date for each festival.

Released Date	Region	Festival	Title	Note	Ref(s)
March 10, 2018	Japan	Osaka Asian Film Festival	男たちの挽歌 2018	Special Screening	
March 11, 2018	Netherlands	CinemAsia Film Festival	A Better Tomorrow 2018	European Premiere; Closing Film	
March 31, 2018	United Kingdom	Newcastle International Film Festival	A Better Tomorrow	UK Premiere	
April 24, 2018	Italy	Far East Film Festival	A Better Tomorrow 2018	Italian Premiere	

=== Home media ===
A Better Tomorrow 2018 with Chinese subtitle was released on Digital HD on March 2, 2018, and A Better Tomorrow 2018 with English subtitle was released on Blu-ray and DVD on March 29, 2018.

== Reception ==
=== Box office ===
A Better Tomorrow 2018 grossed US$10,067,151 worldwide, including CN¥63,067,000 (US$9,969,143) in China. It made US$7.9 million during its opening weekend in China.

=== Critical response ===
A Better Tomorrow 2018 received mixed reviews.

In her positive review of the film, Idarklight of Cfensi wrote, "From some of the boldest music choices to drastic switches in tone of cinematography to one of the most interesting shootout scenes in a while, A Better Tomorrow 2018 felt like a firework so bursting with life that it left me too busy savoring every minute details of brilliance to think about its flaws. You can just feel how much love and thought director Ding Sheng and the cast put into every scene. Even all the jokes avoid lazy one-liners but instead are all carefully set-up earlier to land perfectly." Pablo A. Tariman of Star Cinema praised the film and wrote, "The film delivers as a crime-action flick. The actors give their characters an earthy feel and they remain unscathed all throughout the bloodshed saga."

Conversely, LP Hugo of Asia Film Strike gave the film a negative review, writing, "A solid crime drama on its own terms, A Better Tomorrow 2018 can however not sustain comparison with the original. But despite a wavering tone, some heavy-handed references, it still manages to introduce interesting variations, and benefits from Wang Kai's charisma." Sean Gilman of MUBI Notebook Column wrote, "There's nothing especially unusual about a bland, over-edited and undercooked crime movie. And without the A Better Tomorrow connection Ding Sheng's film would barely be noticed among the sea of mediocrity that is mainstream Mainland cinema."

=== Accolades ===
A Better Tomorrow 2018 received two nominations at the 4th Annual International Jackie Chan Action Movie Week, one for Best Movie Stunt and one for Best New Actor In Action for Wang Talu.
