= Golden Eagle Award for Best Actor (China) =

Main category of the China TV Golden Eagle Award

Golden Eagle Award for Best Actor (Chinese name:中国电视金鹰奖最佳男主角) is a main category of the China TV Golden Eagle Award. From the 1st to the 5th China TV Golden Eagle Awards, the title was "Outstanding Actor" (優秀男演員). From the 6th to the 17th edition, it was renamed "Best Actor" (最佳男演員). Starting from the 18th edition in 2000, following the upgrade of the Golden Eagle Awards to the China Golden Eagle TV Art Festival, the title changed to "Audience's Choice for Most Popular Actor" (觀眾最喜愛的男演員), selected through public voting from nominees for both categories "Audience’s Favorite Leading Actor" (觀眾最喜愛男主角) and "Audience’s Favorite Supporting Actor" (觀眾最喜愛男配角). In the 19th and 20th editions, it was renamed "Audience's Most Popular Actor" (最受觀眾喜歡的男演員), with the winner chosen by audience votes from the top four or five winners of "Audience's Choice for Actor" (受觀眾喜歡的女演員). From the 21st to the 29th editions, the award was rebranded as "Most Popular Actor" (最具人氣男演員), given to the nominee who received the highest number of votes among all candidates in the "Audience's Choice for Actor" category. Since the 30th edition, the award reverted to the title "Best Actor".

== Winners and nominees ==
=== 2020s ===
Year	Number	Actor	Television Series
2024	32nd	Fan Wei 范伟	The Long Season 漫长的季节
2024	32nd	Hu Ge 胡歌	Blossoms Shanghai 繁花
2024	32nd	Yu Hewei 于和伟	Three-Body 三体
2024	32nd	Li Xian 李现	Meet Yourself 去有风的地方
2024	32nd	Jin Dong 靳东	Welcome to Milele 欢迎来到麦乐村
2024	32nd	Zhang Ruoyun 张若昀	Ordinary Greatness 警察荣誉
2022	31st	Lei Jiayin 雷佳音	A Lifelong Journey 人世间
2022	31st	Guo Jingfei 郭京飞	Enemy 对手
2022	31st	Zhang Jiayi 张嘉益	The Stage 装台
2022	31st	Yu Hewei 于和伟	Awakening Age 觉醒年代
2022	31st	Huang Xuan 黄轩	Minning Town 山海情
2022	31st	Ding Yongdai 丁勇岱	Going Across the Yalu River 跨过鸭绿江
2020	30th	Simon Yam 任達華	One Dream One Home 澳门人家
2020	30th	Chen Baoguo 陈宝国	The Legendary Tavern 老酒馆
2020	30th	Wang Jinsong 王劲松	The Thunder 破冰行动
2020	30th	Wang Kai 王凯	Like a Flowing River 大江大河
2020	30th	Jackson Yee 易烊千玺	The Longest Day in Chang'an 长安十二时辰
2020	30th	Zhao Bo 赵波	The Communist Liu Shaoqi 共产党人刘少奇

=== 2010s ===
Year	Number	Actor	Television Series
2018	29th	Li Yifeng 李易峰	Sparrow 麻雀
2018	29th	Zhang Yi 张译	Feather Flies To The Sky 鸡毛飞上天
2018	29th	Yu Hewei 于和伟	The Advisors Alliance 大军师司马懿之军师联盟
2018	29th	Sun Weimin 孙维民	My Uncle Zhou Enlai 海棠依旧
2018	29th	He Bing 何冰	Love in a Courtyard 情满四合院
2018	29th	Zhang Jiayi 张嘉译	White Deer Plain 白鹿原
2018	29th	Liu Yunlong 柳云龙	The Kite 风筝
2018	29th	Hou Xiangling 侯祥玲	Eastern Battlefield 东方战场
2016	28th	Hu Ge 胡歌	Nirvana in Fire\琅琊榜
2016	28th	Wang Lei 王雷	The Ordinary World\平凡的世界
2016	28th	Chen Baoguo 陈宝国	All Quiet in Peking\北平无战事
2016	28th	Gu Zhixin 谷智鑫	Legendary Shopkeeper\乞丐大掌柜
2016	28th	Li Xuejian 李雪健	Hey Daddy!\嘿，老头! The Young Marshal\少帅
2016	28th	Ni Dahong 倪大红	All Quiet in Peking\北平无战事
2016	28th	Wang Kai 王凯	All Quiet in Peking\北平无战事
2016	28th	Wu Xiubo 吴秀波	Ma Xiangyang Goes to the Countryside\马向阳下乡记
2014	27th	Zhang Jiayi 张嘉译	Police Stories of Yingpan Town\营盘镇警事
2014	27th	Wang Luoyong 王洛勇	Jiao Yulu\焦裕禄
2014	27th	Lin Yongjian 林永健	Nie Rongzhen\聂荣臻
2014	27th	Chen Yiheng 陈逸恒	Chang bai shan xia wo de jia\长白山下我的家
2012	26th	Wen Zhang 文章	Snow Leopard\雪豹
2012	26th	Wu Xiubo 吴秀波	Before the Dawn\黎明之前
2012	26th	Lin Yongjian 林永健	My name is Wang Tudi\我叫王土地
2012	26th	Mickey He 何晟铭	Palace II\宫锁珠帘
2010	25th	Sun Honglei 孙红雷	Lurk\潜伏
2010	25th	Huang Haibo 黄海波	A Beautiful Daughter-in-law Era\媳妇的美好时代
2010	25th	Fan Wei 范伟	On Brother's Happiness\老大的幸福
2010	25th	Wang Yi 王霙	Red Cardle\红色摇篮
2010	25th	Zhang Jian 张鉴赏	The Summer\那年·夏天

=== 2000s ===
Year	Number	Actor	Television Series
2008	24th	Wang Baoqiang 王宝强	Soldiers Sortie\士兵突击
2008	24th	Li Youbin 李幼斌	Pathfinding to the Northeast\闯关东
2008	24th	Lin Yongjian 林永健	The Story of Xi Gengtian\喜耕田的故事
2008	24th	Wang Wufu 王伍福	Jinggang Mountain\井冈山
2006	23rd	Zhang Guoli 张国立	Sophora Flower Fragrance in May\五月槐花香
2006	23rd	Li Youbin 李幼斌	Drawing Sword\亮剑
2006	23rd	Chen Jianbin 陈建斌	Qiao's Grand Courtyard\乔家大院
2006	23rd	Wu Jingan 吴京安	Pedigree of Red Flag/ 红旗谱
2006	23rd	Li Xuejian 李雪健	Papa Can You Hear Me Sing?\搭错车
2004	22nd	Liu Jin 刘劲	The Song of Yan'an\延安颂
2004	22nd	Hou Yong 侯勇	The Greatest Dyehouse\大染坊
2004	22nd	Chen Jianbin 陈建斌	Decade of Marriage\结婚十年
2004	22nd	Tong Dawei 佟大为	Goddess of Mercy\玉观音
2004	22nd	Hu Jun 胡军	Demi-Gods and Semi-Devils\天龙八部
2003	21st	Li Baotian 李保田	Dr. Xi Laile\神医喜来乐
2003	21st	Wei Zi 巍子	DA师
2003	21st	Gao Ming 高明	Quiet Promise/誓言无声
2003	21st	Chen Baoguo 陈宝国	The Emperor Han Wu\汉武大帝
2003	21st	Tang Guoqiang 唐国强	Quiet Promise\誓言无声
2002	20th	Sun Haiying 孙海英	The Years of Intense Emotion\激情燃烧的岁月
2002	20th	Tang Guoqiang 唐国强	The Long March\长征
2002	20th	Zhang Guoli 张国立	Loyalty\忠诚
2002	20th	Chen Daoming 陈道明	Kangxi Dynasty\康熙王朝
2002	20th	Zhao Benshan 赵本山	Liu Lao Gen\刘老根
2001	19th	Pu Cunxin 濮存昕	Glorious Journey\光荣之旅
2001	19th	Li Baotian 李保田	Police Li Jiuping\警察李酒瓶
2001	19th	Ren Chengwei 任程伟	Traceless Snow\大雪无痕
2001	19th	Li Youbin 李幼斌	Very Expensive\大雪无痕
2001	19th	Huang Hong 李幼斌	Communist Jin Zhu is a little busy\党员金柱有点忙
2000	18th	Lu Yi 陆毅	Never Close the Eye\永不瞑目
2000	18th	Li Baotian 李保田	Village Chief Li Siping\村主任李四平
2000	18th	Wang Zhiwen 李保田	Criminal Police\刑警本色
2000	18th	Guo Donglin 郭冬临	Palace of Desire\大明宫词
2000	18th	Wang Zhifei 王志飞	Protruding Tight Encirclement\突出重围
2000	18th	Li Youbin 李幼斌	Criminal Police\刑警本色

=== 1990s ===
Year	Number	Actor	Television Series
1999	17th	Tang Guoqiang 唐国强	Yongzheng Dynasty\雍正王朝
1999	17th	Wu Ruofu 吴若甫	To Lead by the Hand\牵手
1999	17th	Cheng Jianxu 程建勋	虎踞钟山

Year	Winner	For
1997	Zhang Fengyi	Peace Time
1996	Li Baotian	Zixiang Liu Luoguo
1995	Bao Guo'an	Romance of the Three Kingdoms 三国演义
1994	Jiang Wen	Beijinger in New York
1993	Liu Wei	Tang Ming Huang
1992	Ge You	Stories in the Media Office
1991	Li Xuejian	Aspiration
1990	Yan Xiang	The Morning of Shanghai

=== 1980s ===
Year	Winner	For
1989	Chen Daoming	The Last Emperor
1988	Zhang Jinlai	Journey to the West
1987	Shi Zhaoqi	Triumph in the Midnight
1986	You Benchang	Ji Gong
1985	Li Zhixing	Xu Beihong
1984	Da Shichang	Walking in the Storm
1984	Zhou Lijing	Wreaths at the Foot of the Mountain
1983	Chen Baoguo	Color of the Rainbow
1983	Zhu Yanping	Outlaws of the Marsh
1983	Guo Xuxin	Wasted Years
