= Golden Eagle Award Audience's Choice for Actor (China) =

Television award category

Golden Eagle Award for Audience's Choice for Actor also known as Top Favorite Actors (Chinese name:中国电视金鹰奖观众喜爱的男演员,2000–2020). In the 18th edition, it was split into "Audience's Choice for Leading Actor" (观众最喜爱男主角) and "Audience's Choice for Supporting Actor" (观众最喜爱男配角). From the 19th to the 30th editions, the award reverted to the single category of "Audience's Choice for Actor". This award category was discontinued in the 31st edition in 2022. Regarding the number of winners, for the 19th to the 22nd editions, six, five or four actors received the award. Subsequently, the number of winners was reduced, first to two, and then to a single recipient.

== Winners and nominees ==
=== 2020s ===
Year	Number	Actor	Television Series
2020	30th	Wang Yibo 王一博	Gank Your Heart 陪你到世界之巔

=== 2010s ===
Year	Number	Actor	Television Series
2018	29th	Li Yifeng 李易峰	Sparrow 麻雀
2018	29th	Zhang Yi 张译	Feather Flies To The Sky 鸡毛飞上天
2018	29th	Yu Hewei 于和伟	The Advisors Alliance 大军师司马懿之军师联盟
2018	29th	Sun Weimin 孙维民	My Uncle Zhou Enlai 海棠依旧
2018	29th	He Bing 何冰	Love in a Courtyard 情满四合院
2018	29th	Zhang Jiayi 张嘉译	White Deer Plain 白鹿原
2018	29th	Liu Yunlong 柳云龙	The Kite 风筝
2018	29th	Hou Xiangling 侯祥玲	Eastern Battlefield 东方战场
2016	28th	Hu Ge 胡歌	Nirvana in Fire\琅琊榜
2016	28th	Wang Lei 王雷	The Ordinary World\平凡的世界
2016	28th	Chen Baoguo 陈宝国	All Quiet in Peking\北平无战事
2016	28th	Gu Zhixin 谷智鑫	Legendary Shopkeeper\乞丐大掌柜
2016	28th	Li Xuejian 李雪健	Hey Daddy!\嘿，老头! The Young Marshal\少帅
2016	28th	Ni Dahong 倪大红	All Quiet in Peking\北平无战事
2016	28th	Wang Kai 王凯	All Quiet in Peking\北平无战事
2016	28th	Wu Xiubo 吴秀波	Ma Xiangyang Goes to the Countryside\马向阳下乡记
2014	27th	Wang Luoyong 王洛勇	Jiao Yulu\焦裕禄
2014	27th	Zhang Jiayi 张嘉译	Ying pan zhen jing shi\营盘镇警事
2014	27th	Lin Yongjian 林永健	Nie Rongzhen\聂荣臻
2014	27th	Chen Yiheng 陈逸恒	Chang bai shan xia wo de jia\长白山下我的家
2012	26th	Wu Xiubo 吴秀波	Before the Dawn\黎明之前
2012	26th	Wen Zhang 文章	Snow Leopard\雪豹
2012	26th	Lin Yongjian 林永健	My name is Wang Tudi\我叫王土地
2012	26th	Mickey He 何晟铭	Palace II\宫锁珠帘
2010	25th	Sun Honglei 孙红雷	Lurk\潜伏
2010	25th	Huang Haibo 黄海波	A Beautiful Daughter-in-law Era\媳妇的美好时代
2010	25th	Fan Wei 范伟	On Brother's Happiness\老大的幸福
2010	25th	Wang Yi 王霙	Red Cardle\红色摇篮
2010	25th	Zhang Jian 张鉴赏	The Summer\那年·夏天

=== 2000s ===
Year	Number	Actor	Television Series
2008	24th	Li Youbin 李幼斌	Pathfinding to the Northeast\闯关东
2008	24th	Lin Yongjian 林永健	The Story of Xi Gengtian\喜耕田的故事
2008	24th	Wang Baoqiang 王宝强	Soldiers Sortie\士兵突击
2008	24th	Wang Wufu 王伍福	Jinggang Mountain\井冈山
2006	23rd	Li Youbin 李幼斌	Drawing Sword\亮剑
2006	23rd	Chen Jianbin 陈建斌	Qiao's Grand Courtyard\乔家大院
2006	23rd	Wu Jingan 吴京安	Pedigree of Red Flag/ 红旗谱
2006	23rd	Li Xuejian 李雪健	Papa Can You Hear Me Sing?\搭错车
2004	22nd	Hou Yong 侯勇	The Greatest Dyehouse\大染坊
2004	22nd	Liu Jin 刘劲	The Song of Yan'an\延安颂
2004	22nd	Chen Jianbin 陈建斌	Decade of Marriage\结婚十年
2004	22nd	Tong Dawei 佟大为	Goddess of Mercy\玉观音
2004	22nd	Hu Jun 胡军	Demi-Gods and Semi-Devils\天龙八部
2003	21st	Li Baotian 李保田	Dr. Xi Laile\神医喜来乐
2003	21st	Wei Zi 巍子	DA师
2003	21st	Gao Ming 高明	Quiet Promise/誓言无声
2003	21st	Chen Baoguo 陈宝国	The Emperor Han Wu\汉武大帝
2003	21st	Tang Guoqiang 唐国强	Quiet Promise\誓言无声
2002	20th	Sun Haiying 孙海英	The Years of Intense Emotion\激情燃烧的岁月
2002	20th	Tang Guoqiang 唐国强	The Long March\长征
2002	20th	Zhang Guoli 张国立	Loyalty\忠诚
2002	20th	~~Chen Daoming 陈道明~~ (Note: Absent from the award ceremony and disqualified from winning.)	~~Kangxi Dynasty\康熙王朝~~
2002	20th	~~Zhao Benshan 赵本山~~	~~Liu Lao Gen\刘老根~~
2001	19th	Pu Cunxin 濮存昕	Glorious Journey\光荣之旅
2001	19th	Li Baotian 李保田	Police Li Jiuping\警察李酒瓶
2001	19th	Ren Chengwei 任程伟	Traceless Snow\大雪无痕
2001	19th	Li Youbin 李幼斌	Very Expensive\大雪无痕
2001	19th	Huang Hong 李幼斌	Communist Jin Zhu is a little busy\党员金柱有点忙
2000	18th	Lu Yi 陆毅	Never Close the Eye\永不瞑目
2000	18th	Li Baotian 李保田	Village Chief Li Siping\村主任李四平
2000	18th	Wang Zhiwen 李保田	Criminal Police\刑警本色
