= White Deer Plain =

White Deer Plain may refer to:

- White Deer Plain (novel), a 1993 Chinese novel by Chen Zhongshi
- White Deer Plain (film), a 2011 Chinese film based on Chen's novel
- White Deer Plain (TV series), a 2017 Chinese TV series based on Chen's novel
