= Wu Gang (actor) =

Chinese actor (born 1962)

- 吴刚
- Born: 9 December 1962 (age 63); Beijing, China
- Occupation: Actor
- Years active: 1985–present
- Spouse: Yue Xiuqing (m. 1991)
- Children: 1

Chinese name
- Traditional Chinese: 吳剛
- Simplified Chinese: 吴刚
Transcriptions
Standard Mandarin
- Hanyu Pinyin: Wú Gāng

Wu Gang (born 9 December 1962) is a Chinese actor. He is known for his roles in Red Firecracker, Green Firecracker (1994), and Iron Man (2009) for which he won both Golden Rooster Award for Best Actor and Shanghai Film Critics Award for Best Actor.

== Filmography ==
=== Film ===
Year	English title	Chinese title	Role	Notes/Ref.
2001	Falling Stars in the Fall	秋天的流星雨	Yang Shun	
2003	The Law of Romance	警察有约	Liu Suozhang	
2007	Trouble Makers	光荣的愤怒	Ye Guangrong	
2007	The Case	箱子	He Dashang	
2008	Forever Enthralled	梅兰芳	Fei Erye	
2009	Iron Man	铁人	Wang Jinxi	
2009	The Message	风声	Liu'ye	
2009	Six Sisters in the War	沂蒙六姐妹	Qu'zhang	
2009	The Founding of a Republic	建国大业	Wen Yiduo	
2010	Antecedent Trial	预审	Wang Mingli	
2011	No Liar, No Cry	不怕贼惦记	Lao Bei	
2012	The Great Magician	大魔术师	Liu Guanjia	
2012	White Deer Plain	白鹿原	Lu Zilin	
2012	The Bullet Vanishes	消失的子弹	Jin Ju'zhang	
2013	Mark of Youth	全城高考	Ren Hongsheng	
2013	Better and Better	越来越好之村晚	Lao Gengtou	
2015	Lady of the Dynasty	王朝的女人·杨贵妃	Gao Lishi	
2017	Youth Dinner	六人晚餐	Ding Bogang	
2017	Wolf Warriors 2	战狼2	He Jianguo	
2017	Six Years, Six Days	六年，六天	Lu Yongming	
2018	Air Strike	大轰炸	Zhao Chun	
2019	A City Called Macau	妈阁是座城		
2019	Super Me	超级的我	Sang Yu	

=== Television series ===
Year	English title	Chinese title	Role	Notes/Ref.
1992	Money and Fame	拳赌双至尊	Boxer	
1994	Romance of the Three Kingdoms	三国演义	Assassin	
1996	Chronicles of the Eastern Zhou Kingdoms	东周列国	Wu Zixu	
1997		南方有嘉木	Hang Jiuzhai	
2001		堆积情感	Lao'er	
2003		天眼	Tang Wanfeng	
2003		瑞雪飘飘	Wu Jiagou	
2004	Behind the Sun	太阳背面	Dai Huan	
2004	The Black Ants	黑蚂蚁	Xue Cheng	
2006	Pregnant for Ten Months	十月怀胎	Fei Chuang	
2007		左伟和杜叶的婚姻生活	Zuo Wei	
2007		太阳作证	Luo Haishan	
2007		哥们	Zheng Jun	
2007	Qiu Haitang	秋海棠	Cang Wenxi	
2008	Changjiang No.1	长江一号	Li Sheng	
2009	Lurk	潜伏	Lu Qiaoshan	
2010		我是你儿子	Yang Shulin	
2011		利剑无锋	Gu Qiumu	
2011		一世牵挂	Shi Feng	
2011	The Campaign	喋血百花图	Dun'zi	
2012		强者风范	Cai Yinghao	
2013	Xu Beihong	徐悲鸿	Xu Beihong	
2013	Family	全家福	Wang Mantang	
2014		别叫我兄弟	Tong's father	
2014	Kill the Evils Off	杀尽豺狼	Qi Mantang	
2014	My Undercover Career	我的绝密生涯	Fang Bi	
2014	The Stand-In	十月围城	Li Yutang	
2014	Hanyang Zao	汉阳造	Xia Zhiqian	
2016	Man with No Name	无名者	Zheng Bohong	
2016	Before Dawn	潜伏在黎明之前	Shen Zaixin	
2016	Winner	决胜	Heng Bikuo	
2017	In the Name of the People	人民的名义	Li Dakang	
2018	Entering a New Era	风再起时	Hou Bingzhong	
2019	The Thunder	破冰行動	Li Weimin	
2019	Spy Hunter	天衣无缝	Gu Wenqing	
2019	Joy of Life	庆余年	Chen Pingping	
2019	Detective Kechen	神探柯晨	Sun Mantang	
2020	Snow Leopard 2	雪豹2		
2020	Roving Inspection Team	人民的正义	Song Zhiming	
2020	The Dragnet	刑警之海外行动	Gao Xiaotian	
2021	Dreams and Glory	光荣与梦想	Chen Du Xiu	
2022	Hu Tong	胡同	Lin Zheng	
2023	The Knockout	狂飙	Xu Zhong	
2023	Under the Microscope	显微镜下的大明	Fan Yuan	
2023	New Vanity Fair	春日暖阳	Ding Ke Mang	
2023	Gen Z	后浪	Ren Xin Zheng	
2023	Bright Eyes in the Dark	他从火光中走来	Meng Guo Hong	
2024	Joy of Life 2	庆余年 第二季	Chen Pingping	

== Awards and nominations ==
Year	Award	Category	Nominated work	Results	Ref.
2009	18th Shanghai Film Critics Awards	Best Actor	Iron Man	Won	
2009	13th Huabiao Awards	Outstanding Actor	Iron Man	Nominated	
2009	27th Golden Rooster Awards	Best Actor	Iron Man	Won	
2011	13th Golden Phoenix Awards	Society Award	Iron Man	Won	
2012	49th Golden Horse Film Festival and Awards	Best Supporting Actor	White Deer Plain	Nominated	
2013	13th Chinese Film Media Awards	Best Supporting Actor	White Deer Plain	Nominated	
2017	23rd Shanghai Television Festival	Best Supporting Actor	In the Name of People	Won	
2018	34th Hundred Flowers Awards	Best Supporting Actor	Wolf Warrior 2	Nominated	
2019	15th Chinese American Film Festival	Best Actor	The Thunder	Won	
2019	Golden Bud - The Fourth Network Film And Television Festival	Best Actor	The Thunder, Detective Ke Chen	Nominated	
2019	6th The Actors of China Award Ceremony	Best Actor (Ruby Category)	The Thunder, Detective Ke Chen	Won	
