= Tieren =

Tieren may refer to:

- Iron Man (2009 film)
- Liaoning Tieren F.C.
