= Shanghai Film Critics Award for Best Actor =

Annual Chinese film award

Best Actor is one of the main category of Shanghai Film Critics Awards.

== Winners list ==
Year	Winner	Chinese name	Title(s)	Chinese Title(s)
2014	Liao Fan	廖凡	Black Coal, Thin Ice	《白日烟火》
2013	Zhang Guoli	张国立	Back to 1942	《一九四二》
2012	Chen Kun	陈坤	Qian Xue Sen	《钱学森》
2011	Jiang Wen	姜文	The Lost Bladesman	《关云长》
2010	Donnie Yen	甄子丹	Bodyguards and Assassins	《十月围城》
2009	Wu Gang	吴刚	Iron Man	《铁人》
2008	Jet Li	李连杰	The Warlords	《投名状》
2007	Jay Chow	周杰伦	Curse of the Golden Flower	《满城尽带黄金甲》
2006	Chen Kun	陈坤	The Music Box	《理发师》
2005	Wang Luoyong	王洛勇	Deng Xiaoping 1928	《邓小平1928》
2004	Li Youbin	李幼斌	Jing Tao Hai Lang	《惊涛骇浪》
2003	Jiang Wen	姜文	The Missing Gun	《寻枪》
2002	Chen Jun	陈军	Chen Tianhua	《陈天华》
2001	N/A			
1999	Feng Gong	冯巩	Mei shi tou zhe le	《没事偷着乐》
1998	Lin Liankun	林连昆	The Opium War	《鸦片战争》
1997	Liu Peiqi	刘佩奇	The Days Without Lei Feng	《离开雷锋的日子》
1995	Niu Zhenhua	牛振华	Back to Back, Face to Face	《背靠背，脸对脸》
1994	Xiao Rongsheng	肖荣生	City Tale	《都是情话》
