= The Secret of China =

- Traditional Chinese: 紅星照耀中國
- Simplified Chinese: 红星照耀中国
- Hanyu Pinyin: Hóngxīng Zhàoyào Zhōngguó
- Directed by: Wang Jixing
- Written by: Tangxi
- Produced by: Han Mei
- Starring: Wang Pengkai; Kenan Heppe
- Production companies: Propaganda Department of the CPC Sichuan Provincial Party Committee; Propaganda Department of CPC Shaanxi Provincial Committee; Emei Film Group Co., Ltd. Wuliangye Group Limited Company
- Distributed by: China Film Co., Ltd.
- Release date: 8 August 2019 (China)
- Running time: 109 minutes
- Country: China
- Language: Mandarin

The Secret of China (Chinese: 红星照耀中国) is a 2019 Chinese historical film directed by Wang Jixing and written by Tang Xi. The film stars Wang Pengkai as Mao Zedong and Kenan Heppe as Edgar Snow. Cast includes Li Xuejian, Li Youbin and Jiang Wenli. The film premiered at Diaoyutai State Guesthouse in Beijing on July 24, 2019, and opened in China on August 8, 2019. It is based on Red Star Over China by Edgar Snow.

== Cast ==
- Wang Pengkai as Mao Zedong
- Kenan Heppe as Edgar Snow
- Li Xuejian as Lu Xun
- Li Youbin
- Jiang Wenli as Song Qingling

== Production ==
Wang Jixing (Jiao Yulu) was hired as the Director and Han Mei (Party chief and chairman of the board of Emei Film Group Co., Ltd.) was hired as the Chief Producer. Wang Jixing asked Li Xuejian to join the cast as Lu Xun.

Most of the film was shot on location in Shaanxi, Gansu, Shanghai and Beijing.

== Release ==
Theatrical release will be on August 8, 2019.
