= Jiao Yulu (film) =

- Film poster
- Traditional Chinese: 焦裕祿
- Simplified Chinese: 焦裕禄
- Hanyu Pinyin: Jiāo Yùlù
- Directed by: Wang Jixing
- Written by: Fang Wen-Hua
- Produced by: Zhang Wenping; Deng Wuwei
- Starring: Li Xuejian; Li Rentang; Zhou Zongyin
- Cinematography: Qiang Jun
- Edited by: Zheng Yongming
- Music by: Lü Qiming
- Production company: E Mei Film Studio
- Distributed by: E Mei Film Studio
- Release date: 1990
- Running time: 100 minutes
- Country: China
- Language: Mandarin
- Box office: ¥53.12 million (distributor rentals)

Jiao Yulu is a 1990 Chinese biographical film directed by Wang Jixing and written by Fang Yihua. It stars Li Xuejian, Li Rentang, and Zhou Zongyin. The film tells the story of Jiao Yulu overseeing the development of Lankao County in Henan province from 1962 to 1964. The film premiered in China in April 1990.

== Plot ==
In late 1962, Jiao Yulu was appointed the second party boss of Lankao County in Henan province. This region had declined into poverty and ignorance. The local residents had to contend with wind and sand storms, waterlogging, and alkaline lands. He was soon promoted to party boss because of his excellent work. Due to years of toil, Jiao Yulu broke down from constant overwork and suffered from liver cancer. On May 14, 1964, he died at the age of forty-two.

== Cast ==
- Li Xuejian as Jiao Yulu
- Li Rentang as Commissioner Zhao.
- Zhou Zongyin
- Zhang Ying as Xu Junya, Jiao Yulu's wife.
- Tian Yuan
- Liang Ying
- Lu Shan

== Accolades ==
Date	Award	Category	Recipient(s) and nominee(s)	Result	Notes
1991	11th Golden Rooster Awards	Best Picture	Jiao Yulu	Won	
1991	11th Golden Rooster Awards	Best Actor	Li Xuejian	Won	
1991	14th Hundred Flowers Awards	Best Picture	Jiao Yulu	Won	
1991	14th Hundred Flowers Awards	Best Actor	Li Xuejian	Won	
1991	State Administration of Press, Publication, Radio, Film and Television	1989-1990 Outstanding Film	Jiao Yulu	Won	
