= White Deer Plain (novel) =

Novel by Chen Zhongshi

- Author: Chen Zhongshi
- Original title: 白鹿原
- Language: Chinese
- Publication date: 1992-1993
- Publication place: China
- Media type: Print
- Awards: Mao Dun Literature Prize (1997)

White Deer Plain (白鹿原; Bailu yuan), also translated into English as The Field of the White Deer, is a novel written by Chen Zhongshi. The novel began serialization in 1992 and it was published in full in June 1993. Spanning more than 50 years of 20th century Chinese history, it depicts the five decades or so entanglements and struggles between two rural clans in the Bailu Plain near the city of Xi'an in Shaanxi province. In 1997, the novel won the 4th Mao Dun Literature Prize.

The epic scope of the novel has also made it a frequent comparison with Lu Yao's Ordinary World which was published in the 1980s, and also won the Mao Dun Literature Prize.

The novel has been adapted twice; into a 2011 film adaptation and a 2017 television series adaptation.
