= Young Marshal (TV series) =

2016 Chinese television series

- Starring: Wen Zhang; Li Xuejian
- Country of origin: China
- Original language: Mandarin

Production
- Production location: China

Original release
- Network: Beijing Television, Dragon Television
- Release: 29 December 2015 – 11 January 2016

Young Marshal
- Simplified Chinese: 少帅
Transcriptions
Standard Mandarin
- Hanyu Pinyin: Shao Shuai

Young Marshal (Chinese: 少帅; pinyin: Shao Shuai is a 2016 Chinese television series. It aired on Beijing TV and Dragon TV from December 29, 2015, to January 11, 2016.

== Synopsis ==
The Xi'an Incident.

== Cast ==
- Wen Zhang as Zhang Xueliang
- Li Xuejian as Zhang Zuolin
- Song Jia as Yu Fengzhi
  - Jiang Yiyi as younger Yu Fengzhi
- Zhang Xinyi as Zhao Yidi
- Huang Ruomeng as Guo Songling
- Sun Liang as Zhang Zuoxiang
- Yu Ailei as Yang Yuting
- Bai Yu as Feng Yong
- You Liping as Chiang Kai-shek
- Gao Liwen as Song Meiling
- Gu Zhixin as Mao Zedong
- Ren Shuai as Zhou Enlai

== Production ==
Production started in September 2014 and ended in February 2015.

== Soundtrack ==
- Opening theme song sung by Han Lei
- Ending theme song composed and sung by David Wong

== Reception ==
To effectively portray Zhang Xueliang, Wen Zhang traveled to Hawaii to find inspiration. This drama incisively portrays the formative years of Zhang Xueliang, while devoting considerable attention to depicting his romantic relationships with Yu Fengzhi and Zhao Yidi. However, some argue that *Young Marshal* falls short in comparison to Zhang Li's previous works.

== Legal Disputes ==
Following the broadcast of the series, Liaoning-based writer Huang Shiming alleged that the show plagiarized his novel, *The Warlord's Mansion*. Huang stated that he would consider taking legal action to safeguard his rights and interests. In June 2016, Huang Shiming filed a lawsuit with the Beijing Haidian Court against the series' creator, Jiang Qitao, and eight other defendants, alleging copyright infringement; he sought to halt the reproduction and distribution of the TV series *Young Marshal* and demanded 3 million yuan in compensation.

=== Ratings ===
China Dragon TV / Jiangsu TV premiere ratings (CSM50)
Episodes	Broadcast date	Dragon TV			Beijing TV		
Episodes	Broadcast date	Ratings (%)	Audience share (%)	Rankings	Ratings (%)	Audience share (%)	Rankings

== Awards and nominations ==
Year	Award	Category	Recipient	Result	Ref.

== International Broadcast ==
Channel	Location	Broadcast start date	Note
Beijing TV, Dragon TV	People's Republic of China (the Mainland.)		
