= The Song of Glory =

2020 Chinese historical series

- Promotional poster
- Traditional Chinese: 錦繡南歌
- Simplified Chinese: 锦绣南歌
- Hanyu Pinyin: Jǐnxiù Nángē
- Genre: Historical fiction; Romance; Wuxia
- Based on: The Concubine's Daughter is Poisonous (庶女有毒) by Qin Jian (秦简)
- Written by: Wu Mengzhang
- Directed by: Huang Bin; Li Huizhu
- Starring: Li Qin; Qin Hao; Gu Jiacheng
- Country of origin: China
- Original language: Mandarin
- No. of seasons: 1
- No. of episodes: 53

Production
- Executive producers: Fang Fang; Huang Xingchen; Xue Ni
- Producers: Wang Ying; Zhang Zhiwei; Jiang Weiqin; Wang Weiyi
- Cinematography: Dong Yong
- Camera setup: Multi-camera
- Running time: 45 minutes
- Production companies: Tencent Penguin Pictures; Huace Film & Media; Croton Entertainment; Oasis Studio

Original release
- Network: Tencent Video; Viki (international)
- Release: July 1 – August 28, 2020

Related
- The Princess Weiyoung

The Song of Glory (Chinese: 锦绣南歌; pinyin: Jǐnxiù Nángē) is a 2020 Chinese television series. It is directed by Huang Bin and Li Huizhu, and stars Li Qin, Qin Hao and Gu Jiacheng. It originally aired from July 1 to August 28, 2020 on streaming platform Tencent Video, and is based on the same source material as The Princess Weiyoung. On November 22, 2021, the series won the International Emmy Award for Best Telenovela, becoming the first Chinese production to do so.

== Synopsis ==
During the Liu Song dynasty, powerful aristocrats have taken control of the government, throwing the country into chaos. To change this, Liu Yikang, the Prince of Pengcheng (Qin Hao) and son of the late Emperor Wu, introduces new policies for reform. To break the alliance between the aristocrats, Liu Yikang enters into a marriage alliance with the Shen family, who has roots in the military. His fiancé turns out to be Li Ge (Li Qin), whom he had previously met at a dance house. Li Ge actually took on the identity of her martial arts sister A'Nu. A'Nu was kidnapped as an infant from the Shen family. However, because Li Ge was wearing A'Nu's bracelet, Madame Shen and the rest of the family come to believe she is their long lost daughter, Shen Jia. General Shen, allows her to officially enter the family as Shen Lige rather than Shen Jia. After marriage, Li Ge assists Liu Yikang in dealing with their political opponents and implementing new policies. When General Shen is framed for treason she tries to defend the family and later finds out from her master that she is actually their daughter. However, in response, the aristocrats form an alliance to suppress Li Ge and the Shen family, which is massacred. Pained by the loss, Li Ge vows to take revenge for her family.

Note that in actual history Emperor Wen had the personal name Liu Yilong and the Prince of Pengcheng or Liu Yikang was his younger brother who served as prime minister instead of the sovereign. Liu Yilong was married to Consort Shen, who later became Empress Dowager Xuan. The Song of Glory appears to partially emulate the life of Emperor Wen, but instead uses the name of Liu Yikang.

== Cast ==
=== Main ===
- Li Qin as Shen Lige
- Qin Hao as Liu Yikang
- Gu Jiacheng as Liu Yixuan

=== Supporting ===
- Qi Ji as Lu Yuan
- Zhang Yameng as Consort Sun
- Guan Xueying as Shen Leqing
- Eddie Cheung as Shen Tingzhang
- Deng Ying as Madame Shen
- Li He as Shen Zhi
- Ren Yunjie as Shen Feng
- Long Zhengxuan as Wang Zijin
- Cai Yida as Chen Shaoxun
- Tan Jianchang as Xu Lin
- Lu Zhanxiang as Kong Cheng
- Wang Cha as Wang Mian
- Li Guangfu as Cui Taifu
- Li Jianyi as Mrs. Xie
- Li Taiyan as Xie Hao
- Du Yuchen as Xie Yunzhi
- Chen Lianping as Lu Yandi
- Tian Xiwei as Lu Wan
- Gao Guangze as Xue Dai
- Cheng Shuonan as San Bao
- Yang Zhen as Xu Zhan
- Liu Hanyang as Ji Shu
- Hu Bo as Huo Yun
- Liu Shu as Fang Qing
- Guan Yue as Xiao Xin
- Li Zhao as A'Nu
- Wang Xiao as A'Ling
- Li Jiayao as Ling Xi
- Tu Liman as Chun Fang
- Furou Meiqi as Hong Dan
- Zhang Xinyue as Yu Yan
- Qian Qianyi as Yu Chan
- Wen Zhu as Mei Qi
- Wei Yibo as Ting Wei
- Du Ziming as Wan Jingsheng
- Chen Qianduo as Yue Mei

== Production ==
=== Development ===
The series was created by the same producers and headed by the same crew behind The Princess Weiyoung. It's based on the second part of the novel The Concubine's Daughter is Poisonous (庶女有毒; Shùnǚ Yǒudú) by Qin Jian, the same source material as The Princess Weiyoung.

=== Filming ===
On March 15, 2019 principal photography started. Wen Weiji and Wang Deming acted as martial arts directors. Shen Zhi, Shen Tingzhang and Shen Mu, together with Song Zhiyan and Yuan Bin, senior group special administrators of Hengdian Actors Guild, organized more than 200 Hengdian actors/extras for filming. The series finished filming in Hengdian Studios on July 27, 2019 and entered post-production.

== Original soundtrack ==
No.	Title	Lyrics	Music	Singer	Length
1.	"Shadow (影)" (Opening theme)	Chen Xi	Dong Dongdong	Zhou Shen	4:06
2.	"Hidden Heart (藏心)" (Ending theme)	Chen Xi	Chen Xi	Bibi Zhou	4:02
3.	"Unforgettable (莫失莫忘)"	Chen Xi	Dong Dongdong	Zheng Yunlong
4.	"Recount (叙)"	Xiao Ximei	Chen Xi; Dong Dongdong	Duan Aojuan
5.	"Continuous obsession (念念相续)"	Chen Xi	Dong Dongdong	Zhang Liange

Hong Kong

No.	Title	Lyrics	Music	Singer	Length
1.	"Said to let go (說過放下)" (Opening and ending theme)	Zhang Meixian	Zhang Jiacheng	Hana Kuk

== Reception ==
=== Critical response ===
Upon its release, The Song of Glory has received mixed reviews. In an article published by Sohu, the plot was described as "weak" and "cliché", although the performances of the lead actors were described as "unflawed". Some scenes were described as "nonsensical". The female lead was described as lacking character development, making her hard to empathize with. The article concluded by saying that "the series failed to show the process of how the outcomes are achieved", adding that "there is no logical reasoning behind emotions to support viewers' understanding [of the characters]".

A review published by Soompi, on the other hand, was more favourable. It described the plot as "captivating" and "with a dreamy love story", while also praising the series' "gorgeous production values". The review also complimented the costumes, which are "memorable without crossing into ostentatious", and sets, which have "very distinctive decor and atmosphere". The fighting scenes and several points of the plot, such as female friendship, and family dynamics were also singled out for praise.

=== Ratings ===
The combined weekly ratings of The Song of Glory on TVB channels Jade and myTV SUPER is the following:

Week	Episodes	Date	Average ratings (%)	Highest ratings (%)
1	1–7	September 14 – September 19, 2020	20.3	22.7
2	8–12	September 21 – September 25, 2020	19.9	21.0
3	13–19	September 28 – October 3, 2020	18.2	20.3
4	20–26	October 5 – October 10, 2020	19.8	21.0
5	27–31	October 12 – October 16, 2020	21.3	22.7
6	32–38	October 19 – October 24, 2020	19.7	22.2
7	39–43	October 26 – October 30, 2020	20.4	21.9
8	44–48	November 2 – November 6, 2020	21.3	21.5
Full series			19.8	22.7

- Highest ratings are marked in red, lowest ratings are marked in blue.

=== Awards and nominations ===
Award	Category	Nomination	Result	Ref.
49th International Emmy Awards	Best Telenovela	The Song of Glory	Won	
2020 Hengdian Film Festival	Best TV Series	The Song of Glory	Nominated	
2020 Tencent Video TV & Movie Awards	Jury Award – TV Series of the Year	The Song of Glory	Won	
2020 China Television Drama Production; Industry Association Awards	Outstanding Young Director	Huang Bin	Nominated	

== International broadcast ==
Country	Channel	Date	Time slot
Hong Kong	Jade	September 14 – November 6, 2020	Monday to Friday 20:30–21:30; Saturdays 20:30–22:30
Malaysia	Astro TV	July 9 – August 30, 2020	Daily 19:00–20:00
South Korea	Chunghwa TV	October 12 – December 23, 2020	Monday to Friday 22:00–23:00
Taiwan	CTi Entertainment	July 26 – October 6, 2021	Monday to Friday 21:00–22:00
