= Li Xuejian =

Chinese actor

- 李雪健
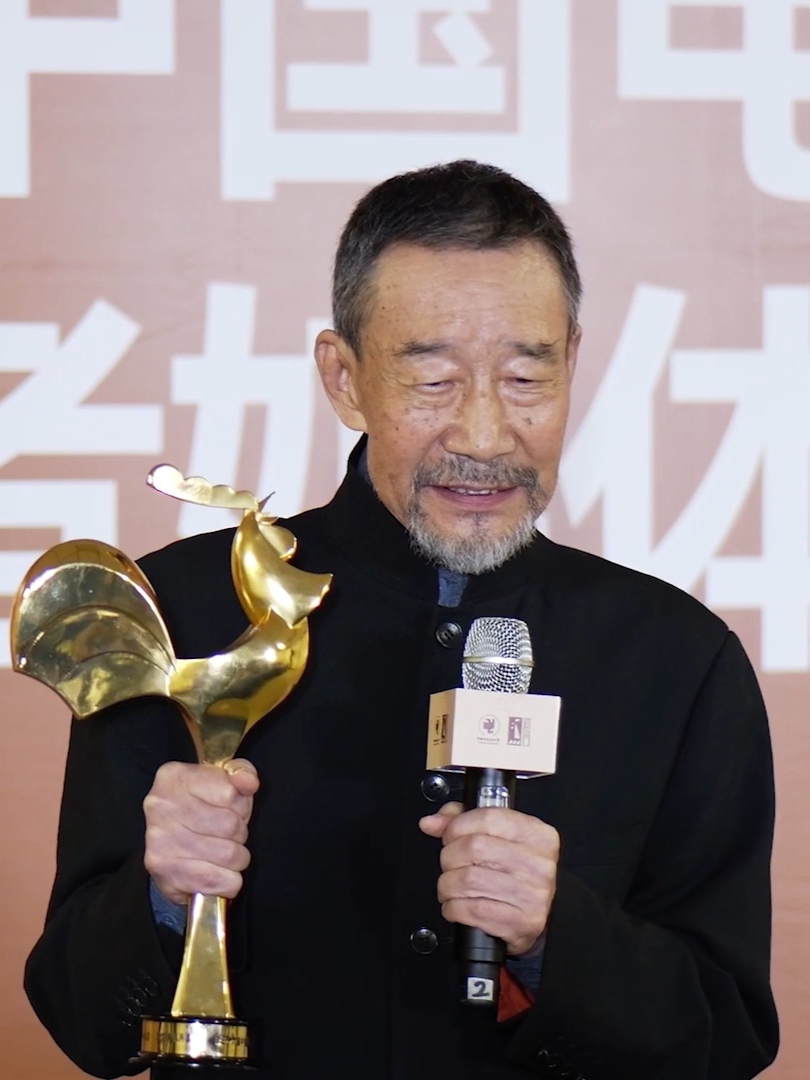
- Li at the 36th Golden Rooster Awards Ceremony
- Born: February 20, 1954 (age 72); Juye County, Shandong, China
- Education: China National Experimental Theater
- Occupation: Actor
- Years active: 1978–present
- Political party: Chinese Communist Party
- Spouse: Yu Haidan (m. 1983)
- Children: one son, Li Gen
- Awards: Full list

Li Xuejian (Chinese: 李雪健; pinyin: Lí Xuějiàn; born February 20, 1954) is a veteran Chinese actor, best known for portraying Song Jiang in The Water Margin television series, CCTV's 1998 adaptation of the classical novel of the same title. Li also played the various historical military and political figures in the Chinese Civil War, and acted in the 2006 film The Go Master based on the biography of go player Go Seigen.

== Personal life ==
In 1983, Li Xuejian married Yu Haidan (于海丹), an actress from Kongzheng Art Troupe. The couple has a son, Li Gen (李亘).

== Filmography ==
=== Film ===
Year	English title	Chinese title	Role	Notes
1982	Tianshan Mountain Trek	天山行	She Haizhou	
1986	The Steel-File General	钢锉将军	Li Li	
1987	Street Players	鼓书艺人	Fang Baoqing	
1988	Super Sleuth	大侦探	Du Yifu	
1989	Unforgettable Life	特殊手术室	Jiang Wenxiong	
1990	Jiao Yulu	焦裕禄	Jiao Yulu	
1992	Family Portrait	四十不惑	Cao Depei	
1993	Shadow of Dream	如烟往事	Wan Renle	
1993	Story of Shazhen	沙镇的故事	Yang Mingyuan	
1993	The Blue Kite	蓝风筝	Li Guodong	
1994	Shengsi Paidang	生死拍档	Inspector Li	
1995	Flying Tigers	飞虎队	Wang Qiang	
1995	Shanghai Triad	摇啊摇，摇到外婆桥	Liu, Sixth Uncle	
1997	Keep Cool	有话好好说	Taxi driver	
1998	The Emperor and the Assassin	荆轲刺秦王	Ying Zheng	
1999	Roaring Across the Horizon	横空出世	Feng Shi	
2000	Jianke Chunqiu	剑客春秋	Zhongshan Fuzi	
2000	Happy Times	幸福时光	Old Li	
2004	South of the Clouds	云的南方	Xu Daqin	
2004	Hetong Fuzi	合同父子	Ding Zhenhai	
2006	The Go Master	吴清源	Li Yutang	
2007	Nishi Wode Chuanshuo	你是我的传说	Shang Weimin	
2009	Just Another Pandora's Box	越光宝盒		Scenes deleted
2010	Under the Hawthorn Tree	山楂树之恋	Village chief Zhang	
2011	The Founding of a Party	建党伟业	Yang Changji	
2011	To My Wife	百年情书	Lin Xiaoying	
2011	Yang Shanzhou	杨善洲	Yang Shanzhou	
2012	Back to 1942	一九四二	Li Peiji	
2015	Monk Comes Down the Mountain	道士下山	Old Taoist priest	
2016	Old Aunt(also known as "The Woman Behind the Man")	老阿姨	Gan Zuchang	
2017	Love Education	相爱相亲	Court staff	
2019	The Secret of China	红星照耀中国	Lu Xun	
2021	My Country, My Parents	我和我的父辈	An old scientist	guest
2022	Home Coming	万里归途	Chinese ambassador	
2023	Creation of the Gods I: Kingdom of Storms	封神第一部：朝歌风云	King Wen of Zhou (Ji Chang)	
2025	Creation of the Gods II: Demon Force	封神第二部：战火西岐	King Wen of Zhou (Ji Chang)	
2026	Traces of Justice	神探之痕迹	elderly Cui Xun	

=== Television ===
Year	English title	Chinese title	Role	Notes/Ref.
1989	Li Dazhao	李大钊	Li Dazhao	
1990	Ke Wang	渴望	Song Dacheng	
1994	Zaoyu Zuotian	遭遇昨天	Hao Wancheng	
1994	Aishei Shishei	爱谁是谁	Jing Rubin	
1995	Woai Wojia	我爱我家	Su Zong	
1998	The Water Margin	水浒传	Song Jiang	
1998	Da Fating	大法庭	Judge	
1998	Jueze	抉择	Li Gaocheng	
1999	Where Dreams Begin	梦开始的地方	Song Yanpei	
2000	The Imperial Sword	尚方宝剑	Pan An	
2000	Live Together	好日子一起过		
2001	China Rail	中国轨道	Zhao Hanzhang	
2001	The Grand Mansion Gate	大宅门	Eighth Master Yu	
2004	Historical Sky	历史的天空	Yang Tinghui	
2004	Chinese Story	中国故事	Mr. Ma	
2005	Da Cuo Che	搭错车	Sun Li	
2005	Benefits and Costs	利益与代价	Cao Yuanfeng	
2005	The Battle of Yijiang Island	海之门	Secretary Li	
2006	Zhao Shuli	赵树理	Zhao Shuli	
2006	Love in Tangshan	唐山绝恋	Xiang Guohua	
2007	High Latitude	高纬度战栗	Lao Donglin	
2007	New Shanghai Bund	新上海滩	Feng Jingyao	
2008	Beautiful Life	美丽人生	Wu Zhengde	
2008	Taiwan 1895	台湾1895	Li Hongzhang	
2009	Father's War	父亲的战争	Luo Dacheng	
2010	Father's Love	父爱如山	Han Lide	
2010	Destiny	命运	Song Zinan	
2012	Conspirator	策反者	Mr. Yan	
2012	A Lone Hero	孤军英雄	Hao Junjie	
2013	In the Name of Happiness	有你才幸福	Qi Ruinian	
2015	Hey Daddy	嘿，老头！	Liu Ertie	
2015	For A Word	为了一句话	Han Jingming	
2015	Young Marshal	少帅	Zhang Zuolin	
2018	Beibu Gulf People	北部湾人家	Wei Dazhuang	
2019	Land of Hope	希望的大地	Wu Wenyuan	
2019	Homeland	河山	Wei Xiluo	
2021	To Be With You	约定	Lin Hegen	
2021	New Generation: Takeoff	我们的新时代	Master Zhao Xudong	
TBA	The World of Chang'An	天下长安	Emperor Gaozu of Tang	

== Awards and nominations ==
Year	Ceremony	Award	Nominated work	Result	Ref.
1990	11th Flying Apsaras Awards	Best Supporting Actor	Ke Wang	Won	
1991	9th China TV Golden Eagle Award	Best Actor	Ke Wang	Won	
1991	11th Golden Rooster Awards	Best Actor	Jiao Yulu	Won	
1991	14th Hundred Flowers Awards	Best Actor	Jiao Yulu	Won	
1992	1st Beijing Film and TV Chunyan Award	Best Actor	Ruyan Wangshi	Won	
1995	3rd China Film Performance Art Academy	Golden Phoenix Award	Shanghai Triad	Won	
2000	6th Huabiao Awards	Outstanding Actor	Fight Bomb	Won	
2004	8th China Film Performance Art Academy	Golden Phoenix Award	Roaring Across the Horizon	Won	
2005	1st China Film Directors' Guild	Best Actor	South of the Clouds	Won	
2005	5th TV and Film Lily Award	Outstanding Actor	Father and Son	Won	
2006	23rd China TV Golden Eagle Award	Best Actor in a Television Series	Papa, Can You Hear Me Sing	Won	
2007	13th Shanghai Television Festival	Best Actor	Once Upon a Time in Shanghai	Nominated	
2009	27th Flying Apsaras Awards	Outstanding Actor	Beautiful Life	Nominated	
2009	9th TV and Film Lily Award	Most Favorite Actor in Ten Years		Won	
2010	Domestic TV series Ceremony	Lifetime Achievement Award		Won	
2011	14th Huabiao Awards	Outstanding Actor	Yang Shanzhou	Won	
2011	28th Flying Apsaras Awards	Outstanding Actor	Destiny	Nominated	
2011	17th Shanghai Television Festival	Best Actor	Father's Love	Nominated	
2012	31st Hundred Flowers Awards	Best Actor	Yang Shanzhou	Won	
2012	19th Beijing College Student Film Festival	Best Actor	Yang Shanzhou	Won	
2012	8th Huading Awards	Outstanding Achievement Award of Chinese TV series		Won	
2012	12th TV and Film Lily Award	Outstanding Actor	To My Wife	Won	
2013	13th Chinese Film Media Awards	Best Supporting Actor	Back to 1942	Nominated	
2013	17th Beijing Film and TV Chunyan Award	Best Actor in Film	Yang Shanzhou	Won	
2013	50th Golden Horse Awards	Best Supporting Actor	Back to 1942	Won	
2014	12th Changchun Film Festival	Chinese Film Art Achievement Award		Won	
2014	20th Shanghai Television Festival	Best Actor	In the Name of Happiness	Nominated	
2015	6th Macau International Movie Festival	Best Actor	Hey Daddy	Won	
2015	13th Sichuan Television Festival	Golden Panda Award for Best Actor in TV series	Hey Daddy	Won	
2015	21st Shanghai Television Festival	Outstanding Contribution Award		Won	
2016	7th Macau International Movie Festival	Outstanding Achievement Award of Chinese Performing Arts		Won	
2016	11th China Goldeneagle TV Art Festival	Best Performing Artist	Hey Daddy/ Young Marshal	Won	
2016	28th China TV Golden Eagle Award	Most Favorite Actor	Hey Daddy/ Young Marshal	Nominated	
2016	22nd Shanghai Television Festival	Best Actor	Young Marshal	Nominated	
2017	8th Macau International Movie Festival	Best Actor	Old Aunt	Won	
2017	24th Beijing College Student Film Festival	Best Actor	Old Aunt	Nominated	
2017	22nd Huading Awards	Best Actor in Chinese modern TV series	Young Marshal	Nominated	
2018	16th Pyongyang International Film Festival	Best Actor	Old Aunt	Won	
2019	4th China Film Festival in Germany	Best Actor	Old Aunt	Won	
2019	11th Macau International Movie Festival	Best Supporting Actor	The Secret of China	Nominated	
2023	36th Golden Rooster Awards	Best Supporting Actor	Creation of the Gods I: Kingdom of Storms	Won	
2024	37th Hundred Flowers Awards	Best Supporting Actor	Creation of the Gods I: Kingdom of Storms	Won	

Cultural offices
Previous: Li Qiankuan (李前宽)	Chairman of the China Film Association; 2013-2018	Next: Chen Daoming
