= White Deer Plain (TV series) =

2017 Chinese television series

- Chinese: 白鹿原
- Hanyu Pinyin: Baílùyuántí
- Genre: Historical drama
- Based on: White Deer Plain by Chen Zhongshi
- Written by: Kun Jie
- Directed by: Liu Huining; Liu Jun
- Starring: Zhang Jiayi; He Bing; Qin Hailu; Liu Peiqi; Li Hongtao; Ge Zhijun; Lei Jiayin; Zhai Tianlin; Li Qin; Ji Ta; Deng Lun; Wang Xiao; Sun Yi
- Opening theme: White Deer Plain Fable (白鹿原童谣)
- Country of origin: China
- Original language: Mandarin
- No. of seasons: 1
- No. of episodes: 76

Original release
- Network: Anhui TV, Jiangsu TV
- Release: 10 May – 21 June 2017

White Deer Plain (Chinese: 白鹿原) is a 2017 Chinese television series. It is based on the Chinese literature classic of the same name by Chen Zhongshi. Its plot revolves around the hardships and spiritual pursuits of several generations living on the White Deer Plain in Shaanxi.

The series reportedly took 17 years of preparation and had a production budget of 230 million yuan (US$33.39 million). It mirrors the changes which have taken place in the Chinese countryside over the first half of the 20th century, and the crew spent time in the countryside to experience rural life for a month before filming commenced. The series is directed by Liu Huining and Liu Jin, and stars Zhang Jiayi as the main character. The 85 episode drama premiered on Anhui TV and Jiangsu TV on 16 April 2017. However, the show was taken off air after one episode. It resumed airing on 10 May 2017.

The series received positive response on Douban. People's Daily praise the series for retaining the essence and spirit of the original work while making the story more dramatic and fascinating, and The Beijing News say that the series is one of the best produced on television. However, it has low viewership ratings, which has been attributed to the heavier subject matter of the drama. White Deer Plain received the Outstanding TV Series Golden Angel Award at the 2017 Chinese American Film Festival (CAFF) at the Paramount Theatre in Los Angeles.

== Plot ==
This is the story of the White Deer Plain, home to the struggles of the Bai and Lu families. Bai Jiaxuan is honest and righteous while Lu Zisen is intelligent and ambitious. Their rivalry lasted for three generations.

== Cast ==
- Zhang Jiayi as Bai Jiaxuan
- He Bing as Lu Zisen
- Qin Hailu as Xiancao
- Liu Peiqi as Mister Zhu
- Liu Hongtao as Lu San
- Ge Zhiyun as Lu Taiheng
- Lei Jiayin as Lu Yaopeng
- Zhai Tianlin as Bai Xiaowen
- Li Qin as Tian Xiao'e
- Ji Ta as Hei Wa
- Deng Lun as Lu Yaohai
- Wang Xiao as Bai Xiaowu
- Sun Yi as Bai Ling

== Ratings ==
Air date	Episode	Jiangsu TV CSM52 City ratings			Anhui TV CSM52 City ratings		
Air date	Episode	Ratings (%)	Audience share (%)	Rank	Ratings (%)	Audience share (%)	Rank
2017.4.16	1	0.654	2.01	5	0.523	1.61	7
2017.5.11	2-3	0.603	2.00	3	0.522	1.73	9
2017.5.12	4-5	0.546	1.81	5	0.495	1.65	8
2017.5.13	6-7	0.547	1.84	5	0.481	1.61	8
2017.5.15	8-9	0.562	1.85	5	0.511	1.68	8
2017.5.16	10-11	0.54	1.86	7	0.478	1.64	8
2017.5.17	12-13	0.605	2.1	6	0.419	1.46	8
2017.5.18	14-15	0.602	2.09	7	0.482	1.67	8
2017.5.19	16-17	0.57	1.92	5	0.499	1.69	8
2017.5.20	18-19	0.613	2.06	4	0.58	1.94	7
2017.5.21	20	0.612	2.1	7	0.527	1.82	8
2017.5.22	21-22	0.642	2.05	6	0.552	1.76	8
2017.5.23	23-24	0.651	2.14	5	0.565	1.85	8
2017.5.24	25-26	0.723	2.42	5	0.527	1.77	8
2017.5.25	27-28	0.691	2.43	4	0.589	2.07	7
2017.5.26	29-30	0.757	2.62	3	0.574	1.99	6
2017.5.27	31-32	0.754	5.607	3	0.613	2.121	5
2017.5.28	33	0.859	3.211	3	0.545	2.058	8
2017.5.29	34-35	0.808	2.837	3	0.625	2.201	7
2017.5.30	36-37	0.863	2.886	3	0.639	2.138	8
2017.5.31	38-39	0.876	2.95	4	0.609	2.06	6
2017.6.1	40-41	0.935	3.25	3	0.626	2.18	6
2017.6.2	42-43	0.951	3.18	3	0.59	1.98	6
2017.6.3	44-45	1.055	3.45	3	0.672	2.2	5
2017.6.4	46	1.022	3.41	3	0.614	2.06	6
2017.6.5	47-48	1.081	3.51	3	0.689	2.24	5
2017.6.6	49-50	1.023	3.48	3	0.721	2.46	5
2017.6.7	51-52	1.066	3.73	3	0.678	2.38	6
2017.6.8	53-54	1.039	3.67	3	0.68	2.41	5
2017.6.9	55-56	1.059	3.620	3	0.640	2.197	4
2017.6.10	57-58	0.998	3.418	3	0.679	2.322	4
2017.6.11	59	1.164	4.212	1	0.669	2.437	5
2017.6.12	60-61	1.208	4.128	1	0.720	2.464	4
2017.6.13	62-63	1.195	4.144	1	0.692	2.392	4
2017.6.14	64-65	1.133	3.96	1	0.732	2.56	4
2017.6.15	66-67	1.047	3.64	2	0.725	2.53	4
2017..6.16	68-69	1.092	3.86	1	0.772	2.74	3
2017.6.17	70-71	1.169	4.09	1	0.762	2.67	2
2017.6.18	72	1.14	4.22	1	0.745	2.78	4
2017.6.19	73-74	1.204	4.19	1	0.788	2.75	3
2017.6.20	75-76	1.146	4.05	1	0.718	2.54	5
2017.6.21	77	1.125	4.13	1	0.734	2.7	5

- Highest ratings are marked in red, lowest ratings are marked in blue.

== Awards and nominations ==
Year	Award	Category	Nominated work	Result	Ref.
2017	8th Macau International Television Festival	Best Television Series	White Deer Plain	Nominated	
2017	8th Macau International Television Festival	Best Director	Liu Jun	Nominated	
2017	8th Macau International Television Festival	Best Actor	Zhang Jiayi	Nominated	
2017	8th Macau International Television Festival	Best Supporting Actor	He Bing	Nominated	
2018	31st Flying Apsaras Award	Outstanding Television Series (Historical)	White Deer Plain	Won	
2018	31st Flying Apsaras Award	Outstanding Screenwriter	Kun Jie	Won	
2018	31st Flying Apsaras Award	Outstanding Director	Liu Jin	Nominated	
2018	31st Flying Apsaras Award	Outstanding Actress	Qin Hailu	Nominated	
2018	24th Shanghai Television Festival	Best Television Series	White Deer Plain	Won	
2018	24th Shanghai Television Festival	Best Director	Liu Jin	Won	
2018	24th Shanghai Television Festival	Best Writer	Kun Jie	Nominated	
2018	24th Shanghai Television Festival	Best Actor	Zhang Jiayi	Nominated	
2018	24th Shanghai Television Festival	Best Actress	Qin Hailu	Nominated	
2018	24th Shanghai Television Festival	Best Supporting Actor	He Bing	Nominated	
2018	24th Shanghai Television Festival	Best Supporting Actor	Zhai Tianlin	Nominated	
2018	24th Shanghai Television Festival	Best Supporting Actress	Li Qin	Nominated	
2018	24th Shanghai Television Festival	Best Cinematography	Huang Wei	Won	
2018	24th Shanghai Television Festival	Best Art Direction	—N/a	Nominated	
2018	29th China TV Golden Eagle Award	Outstanding Television Series	White Deer Plain	Won	
2018	29th China TV Golden Eagle Award	Best Actor	Zhang Jiayi	Nominated	

== See also ==
- White Deer Plain (film)
