= Li Qin (actress) =

Chinese actress (born 1990)

- 李沁
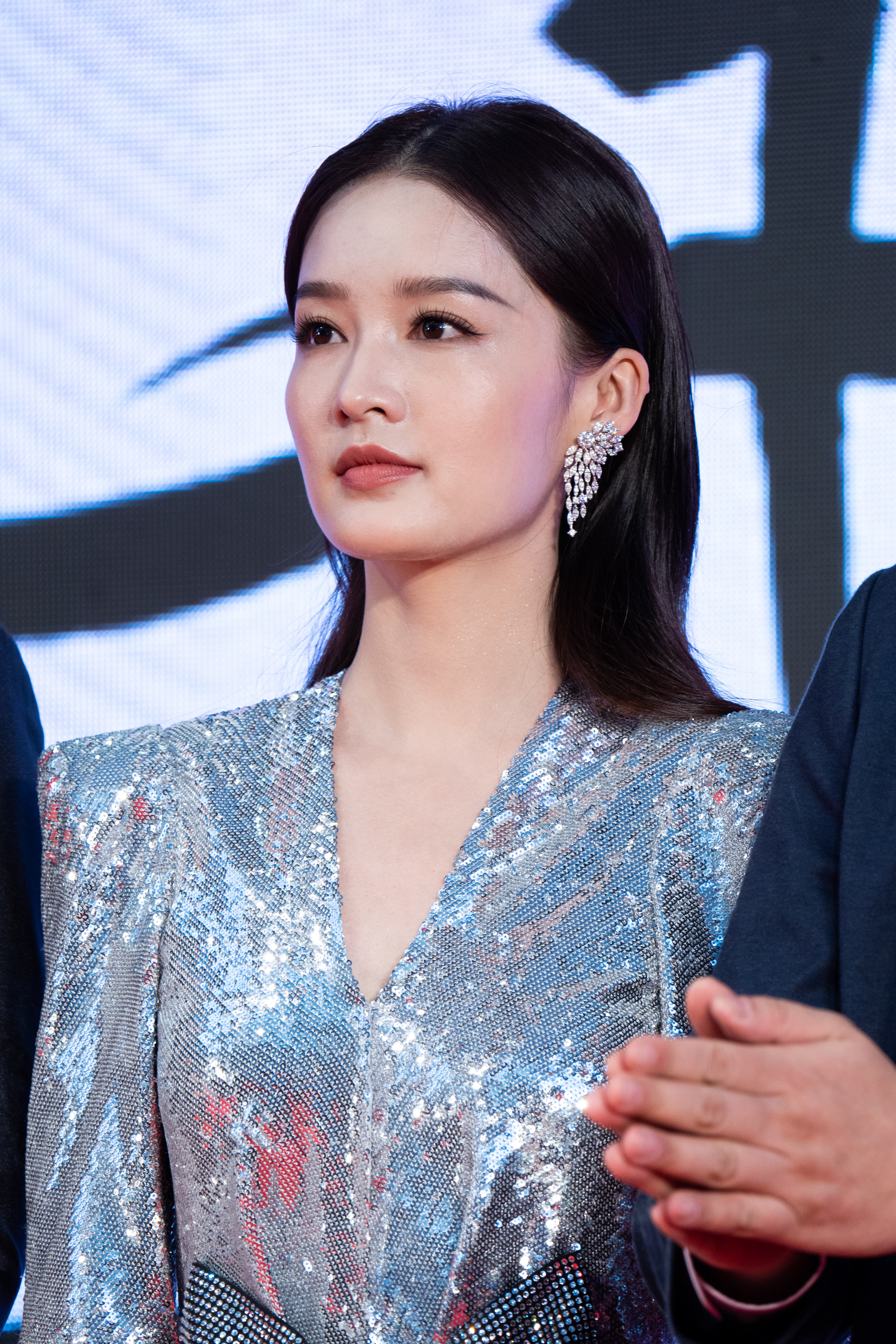
- Li in 2019
- Born: 27 September 1990 (age 36); Kunshan, Jiangsu, China
- Other name: Sweet Li
- Education: Shanghai Theatre Academy
- Occupation: Actress
- Years active: 2008–present
- Agent: Li Qin Studio
- Musical career
- Genres: OST; Mandapop
- Instrument: Vocals
- Years active: 2010–present

Chinese name
- Chinese: 李沁
- Hanyu Pinyin: Lǐ Qìn

Li Qin (Chinese: 李沁; born 27 September 1990) is a Chinese actress. Li is known for her roles in The Dream of Red Mansions (2010), White Deer Plain (2017), Princess Agents (2017), Joy of Life (2019), The Song of Glory (2020), The Wolf (2020), The Youth Memories (2023), War of Faith (2024), and Fated Hearts (2025).

== Early life and education ==
Li was born in Bacheng Town of Kunshan, Jiangsu, China. At the age of 11, Li studied Chinese traditional opera in Shipai Central School.

She graduated from the Affiliated Chinese Opera School of Shanghai Theatre Academy in 2008, majoring in kunqu.

== Career ==
=== 2010–2016: Debut and rising popularity ===
Li first rose to prominence in 2010 for playing Xue Baochai in the television series The Dream of Red Mansions, based on the novel by the same name by Cao Xueqin. She won the Best New Actress award at the TVS Award Ceremony for her performance.

In 2011, Li made her film debut in The Founding of a Party, playing Yang Kaihui. She was nominated for the Best Newcomer Award at the 31st Hundred Flowers Awards. She again played Yang Kaihui in China in 1921, another patriotic tribute production.

In 2012, Li starred in the romantic melodrama television series The Watchful Sky, which won the Gold Angel Award at the 9th Sino-US Film Festival. In 2013, Li starred in romance dramas Shining Days and The Return of a Princess, both of which attained high ratings during their respective runs.

In 2014, Li starred in romance drama If I Love You, and was named the Most Promising Actress at the China TV Drama Awards for her performance. In 2015, Li starred in her first historical drama My Amazing Bride, playing a quirky and adorable heiress.

=== 2017–present: Acclaim and transition to mainstream popularity ===
In 2017, Li starred in the television adaptation of the classic novel White Deer Plain. Her performance as Tian Xiao'e was a "pitch-perfect illustration of a rural woman's miserable life" according to critics, and stood in sharp contrast to her previous performances as youthful and innocent characters. Li was nominated for the Best Supporting Actress award at the Magnolia Awards for her performance. The same year, Li starred in the historical action drama Princess Agents, playing a princess of a befallen kingdom. The drama was a major success and led to increased popularity of Li. That year, Li entered Forbes China Celebrity 100 list for the first time, ranking 100th.

In 2018, Li was nominated at the Hundred Flowers Award for Best Actress for her portrayal of Yang Kaihui in the patriotic film The Founding of an Army. The same year, she played the role of Fragrant Concubine in the palace drama Ruyi's Royal Love in the Palace. Forbes China listed Li under their 30 Under 30 Asia 2017 list which consisted of 30 influential people under 30 years old who have had a substantial effect in their fields.

In 2019, Li played the female lead Lu Xueqi in the film adaptation of the xianxia novel Zhu Xian, titled Jade Dynasty. She then co-starred in the aviation disaster film The Captain as a flight attendant, and received the Best Supporting Actress award at the Gold Crane Awards held by the Tokyo International Film Festival. The same year, she starred in the historical political drama Joy of Life, and gained attention for her role as the drumstick lady.

In 2020, Li appeared in CCTV New Year's Gala for the first time, performing the song item "Hello 2020". The same year, she starred in the historical drama The Song of Glory as the daughter of a military family. She also starred in the comedy film Warm Hug. She ranked 72nd on Forbes China Celebrity 100 list in 2020.

== Other activities ==
=== Endorsements ===
In 2018, Li was selected as brand ambassador for cosmetics brand SK-II.

Since 2021, Italian luxury leather goods brand Furla has announced that Li will serve as the brand's spokesperson. In 2021, she was also become the first brand spokesperson for Laura Mercier Cosmetics in the Asia-Pacific region. Since 2021, Li has been named as brand spokesperson for Forevermark, a luxury retail subsidiary brand of De Beers Group.

In September 2023, American clothing brand Tommy Hilfiger announced that Li would officially serve as brand ambassador in China, alongside Greg Hsu.

== Filmography ==
=== Film ===
Year	English title	Chinese title	Role	Notes	Ref.
2011	Mr. and Mrs. Incredible	神奇侠侣	Lan Fenghuang		
2011	Distressed Thief	落难神偷	Li Manzhen		
2011	The Founding of a Party	建党伟业	Yang Kaihui		
2011	Guo Mingyi	郭明义	Guo Ruixue (young)		
2012	Joyful Reunion	饮食男女	Bai Ping		
2013	Amazing	神奇	Xiao Ke		
2016	Never Gone	致青春2	Meng Xue		
2016	Love O2O	微微一笑很倾城	Meng Yiran	Guest role	
2017	The Founding of an Army	建军大业	Yang Kaihui		
2019	Jade Dynasty	诛仙 1	Lu Xueqi		
2019	The Captain	中国机长	Zhou Yawen		
2019	The World Stands Still for a Second	全世界静止的那一秒		Short film	
2020	First Shot		第一枪	Short film	
2020	Warm Hug	温暖的抱抱	Song Wennuan		
2021	Chinese Doctors	中国医生	Xiang Nanfang		
TBA	Unexpected Love	闭嘴！爱吧			
TBA	The Perfect Blue	她杀	Wu Guan		

=== Television series ===
Year	English title	Chinese title	Role	Notes	Ref.
2010	The Dream of Red Mansions	红楼梦	Xue Baochai (young)		
2011	China 1921	中国1921	Yang Kaihui		
2011	General's Diary		Xiao Li		
2012	Mother's Scheme		Jin Puhe (young)		
2012	The Watchful Sky	守望的天空	Pu Tao		
2013	Shining Days	璀璨人生	Yu Fei		
2013	Return of the Hairess	千金归来	Shen Changqing		
2013	Flower Pinellia	花开半夏	Xia Ruhua		
2013	Protecting the Grandson		Li Xiao'ai		
2014	Term of Validity for Love	有效期限爱上你	Qi Xiaoyu		
2014	Only if I Love You	如果我愛你	An Ning		
2015	My Amazing Bride	极品新娘	Tang Doudou		
2015	Sunflower Love	情满雪阳花	Ye Mingzhu		
2015	Return of Happiness	幸福归来	Yu Youwei		
2017	White Deer Plain	白鹿原	Tian Xiao'e		
2017	Undercover	卧底归来	Tang Guo		
2017	Princess Agents	特工皇妃楚乔传	Yuan Chun		
2018	Battle Through the Heavens	斗破苍穹	Xiao Yixian		
2018	Ruyi's Royal Love in the Palace	如懿传	Han Xiangjian		
2019	Joy of Life	庆余年	Lin Wan'er	Season 1–2	
2020	The Song of Glory	锦绣南歌	Shen Lige		
2020	With You	在一起	Li Tianran	Segment: "I Am Dalian"	
2020	The Wolf	狼殿下	Ma Zhaixing		
2021	My Dear Guardian	爱上特种兵	Xia Chu		
2021	Tears in Heaven	佳期如梦之海上繁花	Du Xiaosu		
2022	From Love to Happiness	从爱情到幸福	Gu Xiaowei		
2022	Thousand Years for You	请君	Yu Dengdeng / Yun Xi		
2023	Miles to Go	人生之路	Liu Qiaozhen		
2023	The Youth Memories	梦中的那片海	Tong Xiaomei		
2024	War of Faith	追风者	Shen Jinzhen		
2024	Snowy Night Timeless Love	七夜雪	Xu Ziye		
2025	The Wonderful World	亲爱的你	Shi Diandian		
2025	Fated Hearts	一笑随歌	Fu Yixiao		
TBA	Live Long and Prosper	咸鱼飞升	Miao Yan		
TBA	Dazzling	醉梦	Liu Xuemei	Cameo	

=== Variety show ===
Year	English title	Chinese title	Role	Notes/Ref.
2015	We Are In Love	我们相爱吧	Cast member	with Wei Daxun

== Discography ==
Year	English title	Chinese title	Album	Notes/Ref.
2010	"Zang Hua Ci"	葬花词	The Dream of Red Mansions OST	
2010	"Song of Chasing Kites"	追风筝的歌	The Dream of Red Mansions OST	
2013	"Hug Me Tight"	抱紧我	The Return of a Princess OST	
2013	"Shadow"	影子	The Return of a Princess OST	
2015	"Left Hand Hold Right Hand"	左手牵右手	My Amazing Bride OST	
2019	"Year of Reunion"	团圆年		Performance for CCTV Lantern Performance with Luo Yunxi & Zhang Binbin
2020	"Hello 2020"	你好2020		Performance for CCTV Spring Gala with Li Xian, Zhu Yilong, Ma Sichun & Zhou Dongyu
2020	"Live Up to the Prime of Youth"	不负韶华		with Yu Menglong

== Awards and nominations ==
Year	Award	Category	Nominated work	Result	Ref.
Major awards
2012	31st Hundred Flowers Awards	Best Newcomer	The Founding of a Party	Nominated	
2018	24th Shanghai Television Festival	Best Supporting Actress	White Deer Plain	Nominated	
2018	5th The Actors of China Awards Ceremony	Outstanding Actress (Emerald Category)	—N/a	Nominated	
2018	34th Hundred Flowers Awards	Best Actress	The Founding of an Army	Nominated	
2019	32nd Tokyo International Film Festival; Gold Crane Awards	Best Supporting Actress	The Captain	Won	
2019	3rd Golden Screen Awards	Best Supporting Actress	The Captain	Won	
2020	7th The Actors of China Awards	Best Actress (Web Series)	Joy of Life	Nominated	
2020	7th The Actors of China Awards	Outstanding Actress	Joy of Life	Won	
2020	29th Huading Awards	Best Actress	Joy of Life	Nominated	
2021	34th Huading Awards	Best Actress	The Wolf	Nominated	
2023	14th Macau International Television Festival	Best Actress	Miles to Go	Nominated	
2024	32nd China TV Golden Eagle Awards	Best Actress	Miles to Go	Nominated	
Other awards
2010	TV Drama South Awarding Ceremony	Best Newcomer	The Dream of Red Mansions	Won	
2010	The Mango TV Fan Festival	Best Couple	The Dream of Red Mansions	Won	
2011	China Power Awards	Most Beautiful New Star	—N/a	Won	
2011	Sohu Entertainment Award	New Face	—N/a	Won	
2013	SMG Hope Tour	Best Newcomer	—N/a	Won	
2014	6th China TV Drama Awards	Most Promising Actress	If I Love You	Won	
2016	ifeng Fashion Choice Awards	Most Popular Actress	—N/a	Won	
2016	Netease Crossover Awards	Breakthrough Actress	—N/a	Won	
2017	Netease Attitude Award	Most Anticipated Actor	—N/a	Won	
2017	L'Officiel Fashion Night Influence Award	Hot Era Reader	—N/a	Won	
2017	24th Cosmo Beauty Ceremony	Beautiful Idol Award	—N/a	Won	
2017	9th China TV Drama Awards	Young Acting Idol Award	—N/a	Won	
2018	25th Cosmo Beauty Ceremony	Beautiful Idol Award	—N/a	Won	
2018	12th Tencent Video Star Awards	Rising TV Actress	—N/a	Won	
2019	China Literature Award Ceremony	IP Breakthrough Actress	—N/a	Won	
2019	Sina The Most Beautiful Performance	Outstanding Actress	The Captain, Jade Dynasty	Won	
2019	Jinri Toutiao Awards Ceremony	Charismatic Actress of the Year	—N/a	Won	
