= Iron Man (2009 film) =

- 铁人
- Directed by: Li Yin
- Starring: Wu Gang
- Release date: 2009
- Language: Mandarin

Tieren (铁人; "Iron Man") is a 2009 Chinese film directed by Li Yin based on the life of the model worker Wang Jinxi, played by Wu Gang. The film was released on Labor Day (May 1), 2009 as part of the celebration of the sixtieth anniversary of the founding of the PRC. Wu Gang won the Golden Rooster Award for Best Actor 2009, Shanghai Film Critics Award for Best Actor and was also nominated for Huabiao Award for Outstanding Actor.
