= Drawing Sword =

- Traditional Chinese: 亮劍
- Simplified Chinese: 亮剑
- Hanyu Pinyin: Liàng Jiàn
- Genre: Historical, war
- Based on: Drawing Sword by Du Liang
- Written by: Du Liang; Jiang Qitao
- Directed by: Zhang Qian; Chen Jian
- Starring: Li Youbin; He Zhengjun; Zhang Guangbei
- Country of origin: China
- Original language: Mandarin
- No. of seasons: 1
- No. of episodes: 30

Production
- Executive producer: Zhao Junkai
- Production companies: Shanghai Film Group Corporation; Hai Run Movies And TV

Original release
- Network: CCTV-1
- Release: September 13 – September 28, 2005

Drawing Sword (Chinese: 亮剑) is a 2005 Chinese historical and Second Sino-Japanese War based TV series directed by Zhang Qian and Chen Jian, written by Du Liang and Jiang Qitao, and starring Li Youbin, He Zhengjun and Zhang Guangbei. It is based on the novel Drawing Sword by Du Liang. The series was first broadcast on CCTV-1 in China from 13 September to 28 September 2005.

In 2013, the large-scale real-life stage drama "Light Sword - Dabie Mountain" based on Tulliang's novel "Light Sword" premiered at the Poly Theater in Beijing.

== Storyline ==
The film is based on Du Liang's "Bright Sword", which tells a historical event in the background of Chinese modern history, from the Second Sino-Japanese War, the latter parts of the Chinese Civil War to the Korean War. In such a time span, it shows a group of Chinese Communist Party generals led by Li Yunlong. Li Yunlong praised the achievements of the generals in the battlefield and affirmed the anti-Japanese achievements of the Chinese National Party.

The TV series only filmed the first half of Du Liang's novel "Bright Sword", and episodes such as Li Yunlong's suicide during the Cultural Revolution were not involved.

== Introduction to grading ==
=== Episode 1 ===
This episode is about the outbreak of the Second Sino-Japanese War on 7 July 1937. Li Yunlong, Commander of 386th Brigade's 1st Regiment 129th Division, led his troops to fight with great courage and to scare the enemy. In an engagement with the Japanese Sakata Regiment, he successfully broke out from the front and took out Sakata. Meanwhile, Chu Yunfei, the commander of the 358th Regiment of the Kuomintang Jinsui Army, took notice of the extraordinary Li Yunlong. As Li Yunlong resisted orders, his superiors decided to let Ding Wei, the 28th regiment commander, who was preparing to go to Yan'an to study, replace Li Yunlong in his former post, and instead transfer Li Yunlong to the rear as the head of a quilt factory. The Japanese sent a combat unit to raid the Independent Regiment, and the regiment suffers heavy losses due to the poor command of the regimental commander Kong Jie. (Drawing Sword, Episode 1)

=== Episode 2 ===
On the road, the former regiment commander Kong Jie briefed Li Yunlong on the battle situation and pointed out that this time the Japanese were fighting differently than before. They fought in groups of three and were also shooting specifically at people's heads. After understanding the situation, Li Yunlong appointed him as deputy regiment commander. Thanks to the efforts of the two men, the brigade commander drank the wine offered by Kong Jie and gave them another chance. The regiment's morale was boosted by the defeat of the army. When the Japanese use Chinese prisoners for training, Wei Dayong, who has practiced kung fu at the Shaolin Temple, asks for battle and strikes out, taking out the Japanese officer with his bare hands, seizing his gun, and leading the prisoners to escape. Zhao Gang is appointed political commissar of the Independent Regiment. On his way back to the regiment he rescues Wei Dayong, a monk who has just escaped from the tiger's mouth. After providing information to Li Yunlong about the IJA's use of POWs for unarmed killing training, Wei Dayong is invited by Li to stay in the army. (Bright Sword, Episode 2)

=== Episode 3 ===
Following Ding Wei's hint, Li Yunlong finds the KMT cavalry battalion and sends Kong Jie to lead a battalion in a sneak attack on Wanjia town. Zhao slowly begins to understand Li Yunlong's actions. With the arrival of Sun Desheng, the elite cavalry company commander, the cavalry company began to train and take shape. 1940 saw the second phase of the war against Japan as Japanese reinforcements advanced into Jinchaji. The Japanese North China dispatch area brigade commander Yamazaki Yehira deviated from the intended direction of travel during a troop march and stumbled upon our army's arsenal. The Japanese army suffered heavy losses and the headquarters issued an order to surround and destroy Nagasaki's brigade. The 386th Brigade was eventually sent out as an independent regiment. (Bright Sword, Episode 3)

=== Episode 4 ===
Li Yunlong led his troops to dig trenches and throw grenades from the bunkers. Li Yunlong's right-hand man from the New First Regiment, Zhang Dabiao, led an assault team to take advantage of the opportunity to advance and wiped out Yamazaki's brigade in a gun and knife fight. The cavalry company suffered 13 casualties, leaving Li Yunlong heartbroken. The two generals behind the Japanese commander of the First Army in Shanxi, Oatuka Yoshinobu, both lost to Li Yunlong, which made him a man he dared not underestimate. With the help of Zhao's political commissar, Li Yunlong began to learn about culture and led the soldiers in one-on-one combat training.(Bright Sword, Episode 4)

=== Episode 5 ===
As an incentive, Li Yunlong stewed a large pot of meat and found soldiers with excellent martial arts skills throughout the regiment to form a reinforced platoon. The Japanese army was also ordered by Chief of Staff Miyano to pay more and more attention to the training of special forces. The Japanese were also ordered by Chief of Staff Miyano to put more emphasis on special forces training. He gives a gun to Li Yunlong and the two of them become friends. Li Yunlong learns through his investigation that the soldiers and officers of Baijia Village are in collusion with the devils and decides to catch a big fish in the name of collecting noodles. But the cunning Yamamoto is afraid that there is something fraudulent in the situation, and in the process of discussing military matters, Li and Zhao and Chu bridge the gap. At the same time, Zhang Dabiao reports that flour has been raised in Baijia Village. The headquarters finds the Japanese 9th Brigade moving forward and sends out men to investigate what has spurred them on.(Bright Sword, Episode 5)

=== Episode 6 ===
The next day, Li Yunlong was about to set off when he received a call from headquarters. Zhao had already reported Li Yunlong's decision to his superiors, who realised that the enemy's situation had changed. He immediately ordered the plan to be cancelled and sent an independent regiment to ensure the safety of the headquarters, while Li Yunlong stayed behind with a battalion. A surprise attack on the headquarters broke the Japanese plan and the Japanese Observer Regiment was wiped out on the way to attack the headquarters, while Zhao Gang's 2nd Battalion, which was guarding the headquarters, was strongly besieged by Japanese special forces. The second battalion of Zhao Gang's battalion, which was defending the headquarters, was strongly besieged by Japanese special forces.(Bright Sword, Episode 6)

=== Episode 7 ===
In 1942, the Japanese commander-in-chief of the invasion of China, Okamura Ningji, carried out a brutal raid on Jinzhong. The commander of the First Army in Jin (Yoshinobu Shinotsuka) was ordered to develop a highly targeted A battle plan, the Eighth Route Army troops suffered heavy losses. Afterwards, the 8th Army developed a strategy to combine with the militia, using tactics such as sparrow warfare, mine warfare and tunnel warfare to fight them off. Li Yunlong's troops also suffered heavy losses in the battle, with the cavalry company fighting to the bitter end with no bullets. The Independent Regiment was left with less than a company of men to fight the last defensive battle against the devils at Xinzhuang. The enemy's sense of smell was becoming more and more acute and they were pushing their headquarters. Zuo Quan, the deputy chief of staff of the 8th Route Army, died heroically while commanding his troops.(Bright Sword, Episode 7)

=== Episode 8 ===
The main content of this episode: Li Yunlong fell ill, Zhao Gang presided over the work, in order to save Li Yunlong life monk Wei Dayong even roughed up the groom to cure the disease, Li Yunlong inside because of war worries, independent regiment to cover the people for the first time in this situation. The Japanese also at this time to discuss the program and prepare a second counter-attack, they target locked independent regiment. The Japanese also discussed their options at this time and prepared for a second counter-attack. Li Yunlong changes his strategy and decides to engage in guerrilla warfare. They are helped by the head of the Women's Aid Society, Xiuqin, and Li Yunlong loses a gun to Xiuqin in a bet. (Bright Sword, Episode 8)

=== Episode 9 ===
When Li Yunlong falls ill, Zhao Gang takes charge. In order to save Li Yunlong's life, the monk Wei Dayong even gets a doctor to treat him. Li Yunlong is worried about the war, and for the first time, the Japanese are discussing plans for a second counter-attack to protect the people. Their target is the Independence Regiment, and they appoint a specialist to study Li Yunlong, the man who is giving them a headache. Li Yunlong changes his strategy and decides to engage in guerrilla warfare, with the help of Women's Relief President Xiuqin. Li loses a gun to Xiuqin in a bet, and the gun saves Xiuqin's life later. (Bright Sword, Episode 9)

=== Episode 10 ===
The Japanese capture Zhu Ziming, who confesses his identity under the intimidation of the Japanese. The meeting between Qian Bojun and Zheng Qianyi is quite meaningful. The Japanese army is advancing step by step, but Qian Bojun's team has anomalies. The Japanese army is taking a step-by-step approach to the war. He is not convinced by his decision, but Qian has his own reasoning. He is not able to understand his feelings, but Qian has his own way of thinking. He quickly prepares for the battle, which he naturally wins, and Chu decides to take care of Qian Bojun himself and clean up the mess. On the other hand, Li Yunlong is again approached by Xiuqin, who asks him to give a lecture to the Women's Aid Society. The two of them are in a tug-of-war, making it even more difficult for Li Yunlong. (Bright Sword, Episode 10)

=== Episode 11 ===
When Yamamoto reported the battle situation to Shinozuka Yoshio, he pointed out: Chu Yunfei's strategic thinking cannot be ignored, and Chu Yunfei is also worthy of attention. Because he is a professional soldier who will not passively avoid battles but will only take the initiative to attack. In the middle of the night, Xiuqin took the initiative to find Li Yunlong, confessed her heart to him and asked Li Yunlong to marry her as a wife.

Li Yunlong said to wait until the victory of the Anti-Japanese War, but he couldn't help but hugged Xiuqin. Yamamoto called Youzuka Yoshio, saying that he had investigated the terrain and defense capabilities of various ministries around Zhaojiayu Village, and was waiting for the opportunity to raid Zhaojiayu.

Li Yunlong and Wei Dayong disguised themselves as businessmen and went to the city to meet Chu Yunfei in secret. In the city, I ran into Duan Peng, who was good at kung fu, and recruited him to his subordinates.

When Li and Chu met in the teahouse, Chu Yunfei wanted to get back the equipment that Li Yunlong confiscated during the mutiny in Lijia Town, but Li Yunlong refused. Facing Li Yunlong's repudiation, Chu Yunfei also felt helpless.

Li and Chu got the information almost at the same time that Gendarmerie Captain Hirata Ichiro was going to celebrate his birthday with a banquet in Juxianlou that night. Faced with this information, the two hit it off, and rushed to the meeting and jointly killed Ichiro Hirata and all the Japanese officers attending the meeting.

=== Episode 12 ===
Li Yunlong's attendance at the meeting was accidentally photographed by the photographer on the night of the banquet, which made Youzuka Yoshio, who had never known what Li Yunlong looked like, very happy. After seeing Li Yunlong's photo, he commented: Although Li Yunlong is just an immature nationalist, if such a person appears on the right occasion, he will cause big trouble.

Li Yunlong checked the sentry late at night, and Xiuqin, who was already waiting at the entrance of the village, asked Li Yunlong to marry her as soon as possible, but Li Yunlong insisted on waiting until the victory of the Anti-Japanese War. Xiuqin found the political commissar in a fit of anger.

Zhao Gang agreed to make the decision for Xiuqin and personally found Li Yunlong, and asked Li Yunlong to marry Xiuqin as soon as possible. Just as the whole regiment was busy with the wedding of its leader Li Yunlong, the Yamamoto special operations team set off.

=== Episode 13 ===
Li Yunlong and Yang Xiuqin got married in the village, and all the soldiers came to cheer. The special forces of the Japanese Yamamoto also decided to carry out a surprise attack at this time. Director Zhu secretly disclosed this information to the enemy, and the Japanese thought it was a good opportunity to attack.

Li Yunlong's sense of responsibility made him not forget to check the sentry on his wedding night. During the bed check, he found that Mr. Zhu had run away with a gun, which aroused Li's vigilance. Li Yunlong dragged the injured political commissar Zhao and the remaining eight soldiers to break out of Yamamoto's army and came to Jiangjunling to meet Chu Yunfei's army.

Chu Fen attacked bravely, and Yamamoto proposed peace talks. When the two sides were in a stalemate, the remaining forces took the opportunity to escape to Ping'an City. Li Yunlong got the news and ordered the battalions to assemble quickly. After the confluence, the expanded strength of each battalion has approached 10,000 people.

=== Episode 14 ===
Li Yunlong commanded the troops to liberate the county and rescue his wife. Yamamoto's troops ask Ozuka Yoshio for help. The Xin 1 Regiment also received intelligence and decided to let go of a small group of enemy cavalry, intercept the Japanese infantry, and vigorously support Li Yunlong's battle of liberating the county.

Chu Yunfei's 358th Regiment also discovered the changes in the Japanese troops and also decided to reinforce them. The blockade delayed the time and indirectly supported the attack of Li Yunlong's troops. As the high ground outside Ping'an Town missed, the reinforcements also blocked the Japanese reinforcements from the road.

The county seat is about to fall, and Yamamoto wants to use the captured Xiuqin to make a fuss, trying to negotiate terms with Li Yunlong. In order to reduce the casualties of the troops, Li Yunlong still chose to sacrifice Xiuqin and fired at the city wall.

=== Episode 15 ===
Li Yunlong buried his newlywed wife, and the headquarters gave a high evaluation to this fruitful battle. In the brigade commander's studio, Li was ordered by his superiors to fight without asking for instructions, and the merits and demerits of the battle were offset.

Li Yunlong went to visit Zhao Gang, who was recuperating, and ran into Xiao Zheng, a nurse in the infirmary. On the one hand, Zhao Gang expressed his joy at Li Yunlong's victory in the battle, but at the same time, he also expressed a little worry about the consequences if he was present.

Chu Yunfei stationed two battalions at the location of Li Yunlong's regiment headquarters - Dagu Town, which angered Li Yunlong. Li Yunlong personally visited the Chu Mansion to discuss with Chu Yunfei.

=== Episode 16 ===
Chu and Li failed to reach an agreement on this issue. Chu Yunfei's transport team was intercepted by bandits Xie Baoqing from Heiyunzhai while transporting food and clothing. On the way back to the city, they ran into Kong Jie's cavalry, and Kong Jie took back the supplies for him.

Li Yunlong invited the heads of the New First Regiment and the New Second Regiment to drink together. At the dinner table, he proposed a plan for the unified deployment of the three regiments, and asked Kong Jie not to return the looted supplies from the previous day. He also sent the Eighth Route Army to camp opposite the Central Army camp. Chu Yunfei lived in the Dagu Town Shuangying, preparing for the future civil war. Chu Shuangying began to panic.

Chu Yunfei wanted to lead the troops to attack Heiyunzhai. After Li Yunlong got the news, he set up Luka to block the food and grass route of Chu Youjun. Kong Jie also approached the staff officer of the 358th Regiment who came to ask for the materials seized that day and explained that the materials were intercepted by Li Yunlong. The helpless Chu Yunfei laughed and said that he had miscalculated this time.

=== Episode 17 ===
Chu Yunfei found out that Li Yunlong wanted to withdraw the three battalions in Dagu Town, Li Yunlong pretended not to know, Zhang Dabiao explained that this was a military exercise requested by the division headquarters, and Li also pretended to report to his superiors first.

Chu Yunfei's troops were running out of food and grass, so they had no choice but to withdraw first. Kong Jie of the New Second Regiment knew about Chu Yunfei's encirclement and suppression of Xie Baoqing. Kong Jie approached Chu Yunfei and proposed to incorporate Heiyunzhai. Chu Yunfei retracted his sword and sheathed it again.

The monk accompanied the recruit Duan Peng home to visit his seriously ill mother, and met the Japanese puppet Luka in Qingyun Town. The two hid their guns in the old crow's nest. They never wanted to be captured by the puppet army because they were strong when they passed the customs and repaired the gun tower for the Japanese army. The two pretended to fight on the construction site, attracted five guarding Japanese soldiers, killed them, and then started a gun battle with other Japanese soldiers who came to help. At the critical moment, soldiers sent by the Independence Regiment rescued the two. Kong Jie and Xie Baoqing negotiated the matter of inclusion. Chu Yunfei entered Anhua City.

On the way to deliver the letter, the monk met Xie Baoqing and his gang who robbed the money. The monk rescued himself and killed a few bandits. He was later attacked by the Shan Mao of the Erdang family who arrived later, and died tragically in Heiyunzhai. Li Yunlong learned that he could not be persuaded by Kong Jie, and led a battalion to encircle and suppress Heiyun Village. The village owner Xie Baoqing escaped, and Li swung a knife to make the second leader pay for his life. Zhao Gang, who had returned from his injuries, was unable to stop Li Yunlong in time.

=== Episode 18 ===
Because of hacking the second leader to death, Li Yunlong was demoted to the commander of the first battalion, and Zhao Gang was acting as the commander of the first battalion, and he was punished once for a major demerit. Chu Yunfei handed over the weapons of the district team, sent an invitation to Li Yunlong, and stated that it was Li Zhi who would not return it.

Zhao Gang objected to Li going there, thinking it was a Hongmen banquet, and the two had a dispute. Chu Yunfei did receive orders from his superiors to get rid of Li Yunlong, and Chu Yunfei made up his mind to give way to politics for personal emotions.

When Li Yunlong went to the banquet, Chu Yunfei proposed to recruit Li Yunlong to the Chu army as the deputy division commander, and proposed to abolish the border government of the Anhua Communist Party, but Li Yunlong politely declined.

During the banquet, Li Yunlong revealed that he was wrapped in explosives to attend the banquet, so Chu Yunfei had to withdraw the pre-arranged troops and send Li Yunlong back home.

=== Episode 19 ===
Japan announced its unconditional surrender, and Ishikawa Shaozuo's troops at the Shimonoseki stronghold received orders to disarm them to the Central Army. Li Yunlong's independent regiment of the 386th Brigade of the Eighth Route Army snatched the clothes and equipment of the Central Army that were about to be disarmed, and accepted the disarmament first, while Chu Yunfei's troops rushed into the air.

As a result, the two troops fought fiercely all night, and both suffered heavy casualties. A few days later, when a certain battalion of Chu Yunfei's army was accepting the surrender of the puppet army, it was surrounded by the Eighth Route Army again, and the national army and puppet troops disarmed together. After the civil war broke out, Li Yunlong, who was the commander of the 2nd Division of a certain column in Huaye, requested instructions to mobilize Zhao Gang from Zhongye to come to the 2nd Division as the political commissar.

Li Yunlong's troops confronted Chu Yunfei's 89th Division again. Li Yunlong led the assault team directly to Chu Yunfei's headquarters, and Chu fled in one step. No high-level generals could be found among the captive enemies, so Li Yunlong asked the captives to run a 5-kilometer long-distance race, and soon the big fish were caught.

The superior sent Zhao Gang to the Political Department. In order to keep Zhao Gang, Li Yunlong pretended to be impulsive, but the aggressive method did not keep Zhao Gang. Li Yunlong gave Zhao Gang the military band from the captives as a gift. The commander ordered Li Yunlong to seize Zhaozhuang, and the enemies of Li and Chu gathered in Zhaozhuang again.

=== Episode 20 ===
Li Yunlong and Chu Yunfei, who has excellent American equipment, fought in the battle of Xu Bang, and both sides suffered heavy losses. Li Yunlong sent scouts to break into the artillery positions of the Chu army at night, destroy the howitzer positions of the national army, destroy eight howitzers, and capture an artillery staff officer.

Chu Yunfei's artillery staff officer was released by Li Yunlong the next day, and he was asked to bring a strategic map back to the Chu division before leaving. The artillery regiment was in place, and the headquarters decided to replace Li Yunlong's Second Division with the artillery camp. With the arrival of reinforcements, Chu Yunfei's troops retreated steadily and lost their positions.

Li Yunlong approached Zhao Gang, hoping that Zhao Gang would borrow the captured army to replenish his troops, and Zhao Gang agreed. Seeing the map brought back by the staff officer, Chu Yunfei felt that the situation was extremely unfavorable to him, so he vented his anger on the captured staff officer Yu and shot him dead.

During the battle to annihilate Huang Baitao, Li Yunlong had another whim, and instead of following the established strategic plan, he reversed the direction of the troops and went straight to the back of the Chu troops.

=== Episode 21 ===
Li Yunlong's troops broke into the headquarters of the enemy's 74th Division by mistake, and the chaos opened up the situation for the Seventh and Tenth Columns, and a large number of guns and ammunition were seized. The military supplies were discovered by the Fifth Division who also passed through the village, and the two troops had a dispute over the supplies for the war. Li Yunlong's usual masculine style took back the supplies.

The headquarters sent Zhao Gang to meet Chen Shaoyou, the deputy commander of the 110th Division of the Huangwei Corps, an agent who was originally a classmate of Yenching University and had been ambushing in the national army. He provided our army with military supplies as a rear defense. In the Wei Corps, Zhao Gang successfully completed the task and returned to the army.

Troop Li put on the captured national army uniforms and had a final duel with Chu Yunfei. Both of them were seriously injured. When Li was sent to the frontline hospital for rescue, he needed blood transfusion. Tian Yu, a nurse with type O blood, volunteered to donate blood.

Zhao Gang arrived after hearing the news and stopped Duan Peng, Li Yunlong's subordinate who heard that Li's life was still in danger and disrespected the doctor. Before the sick bed, Zhao Gang's confidence to Li's past made Li wake up from a coma, and Tian Yu, who was listening at the door, was also deeply moved.

=== Episode 22 ===
Chu Yunfei on the hospital bed was still thinking about Li Yunlong, feeling sorry for the fact that the two could not become close friends because they were their own masters, and they would not even be able to see each other again in the future. The 89th Division lost, and the 800,000 troops of the national army were completely lost.

Luo Wanchun, director of the hospital's political department, tried to introduce a partner to nurse Tian Yu, but Tian Yu refused, and left the army in a fit of anger to cross the river. Zhao Gang was worried about Li Yunlong, so he sent two boxes of Fenjiu to relieve his suffering.

Li Yunlong expressed great dissatisfaction with the care of the former nurse Ajuan, so the hospital decided to replace Tian Yu as Li Yunlong's nurse. In the process of taking good care of Li Yunlong, the relationship between Tian Yu and Li Yunlong gradually developed.

At the same time, the army sent a new guard "little carpenter" Chen Xiaochun to Li Yunlong. (There is a bug in this episode: when Chu Yunfei was in the hospital, when his subordinates visited him, the infusion tube in the camera was a disposable infusion tube that is used now. The one used 60 years ago was definitely not like this.)

=== Episode 23 ===
Deputy Commander Wang called Director Luo. He had also taken a fancy to Tian Yu. After learning that Tian Yu was dating Li Yunlong, he said he wanted them to compete fairly.

Li Yunlong confided to Zhao Gang his love for Tian Yu. After Tian Yu found out that Li Yunlong was secretly drinking at Director Luo's place, Li Yunlong took the initiative to hand it over to "Xinghua Village". Tian Yu confided to Li Yunlong that she did not want to continue working in the hospital because Director Luo introduced herself to the chief's marriage every day, and Li promised to help her find a way.

Deputy Commander Wang came to the hospital to look for Xiaotian. The three confronted each other, and Director Luo was stuck in the middle. Li Yunlong felt that Deputy Commander Wang was familiar with him, and he had had contacts during the anti-revolutionary movement and the subsequent Songyunling battle. Deputy Army Commander Wang knew that he had made a mistake in the movement that year, so he no longer pestered Tian Yu.

=== Episode 24 ===
Li Yunlong writes a letter to Zhao Gang, hoping that they can still be partners after the troops win the war. The whole hospital can see that Li Yunlong and Tian Yu have an abnormal nursing relationship, but Tian Yu is still naive enough to think that they are just good friends.

Li Yunlong's illness is basically cured, and before he is discharged from the hospital, Li Yunlong shows his cards to Tian Yu, hoping that Tian Yu will go with him and marry him. After half an hour of deliberation, Tian Yu only asks Li Yun Long to respect his parents' attitude.

Li goes to Tian's house to meet his parents, hoping to get their consent. The reckless Li Yunlong has a disagreement with Tian Yu's father, who is a scholar, and he leaves the house and punishes himself in the courtyard to show his determination.

=== Episode 25 ===
Tian Mo Xuan agrees to the marriage between Li Yun Long and Tian Yu, which makes Li Yun Long and Tian Yu feel happy. In November 1949, Chu Yun Fei evacuated his troops from the mainland and boarded the "Qing Yun" escort ship, heading for Taiwan, before boarding the ship, he only picked up a handful of motherland's soil and brought it with him.

At the end of 1950, Li Yunlong returned to the army after being wounded, and was appointed as the acting commander of C army. When the Korean War broke out in the same year, Li Yunlong repeatedly requested to lead troops to North Korea, but was not approved, so he had no choice but to "talk on paper" in the war room full of resentment.

Li Yunlong and Tian Yu had a dispute over an oil painting and a piano, which made Tian Yu very sad. When the family conflict is gradually exposed, Feng Nan becomes the only person for Tian Yu to talk to. After Tian Yu's pregnancy, Li Yun Long's attitude towards Tian Yu eases up and he takes the initiative to admit his mistake to Tian Yu and let Tian Yu see what he will do in the future.

=== Episode 26 ===
The wedding of Zhao Gang has always been on Li Yunlong's mind. When Li Yunlong learns that Feng Nan, Tian Yu's classmate, is coming to the military, he thinks that the opportunity is ripe and pretends to have a relapse and chases Zhao Gang to the military. The company's main goal is to get the best out of the world.

However, when ZHAO met with FENG Nan, they had a good conversation. Li Yunlong was ordered to study at the Nanjing Military Academy, but he did not expect to be punished for being two days late in reporting to the military academy.

He was criticized by the director of the academy and had to write a censorship and apologize to the faculty in front of all the students. Later, Li Yunlong was infected by Kong Jie and became interested in learning.

=== Episode 27 ===
Li Yunlong has been doing well at the Military Academy and has been studying the tactics and methods of warfare. The director is very happy and asks Li Yunlong to conduct a targeted study on island entry operations.

Tian Yu writes that his son has been born and asks Li Yunlong to visit his friend Zhang Bailu. After seeing Li Yunlong, who had come to visit him, Zhang Bailu quickly developed a crush on Li Yunlong, and within a few days, Zhang Bailu invited Li Yunlong to a dance.

After that, he kept asking Li Yunlong to listen to movies and watch movies. The fact that Zhang Bailu was attacking Li Yunlong made Kong Jie a little uneasy, so Kong Jie often reminded Li Yunlong to pay attention.

In January 1955, the People's Liberation Army launched the battle of Yijiangshan Island, and in less than 20 hours, it broke the steel fortress that the Kuomintang army claimed to be unbreakable. Zhang Bailu gradually fell in love with Li Yunlong and often invited him to his home. At the same time, Zhang Bailu's understanding also makes Li Yunlong a bit overwhelmed.

=== Episode 28 ===
When Li Yunlong returns home to see his son during the military academy break, he has another argument with Tian Yu over his son's name. When Tian Yu's parents visit, they talk about the relationship between the military and the economy, and Tian Yu's father has a disagreement with Ding Wei and Li Yunlong, which leads to a dispute, and Li Yunlong is furious.

But gradually, Tian Moxian's strategic vision aroused Ding Wei's great interest, and Tian Moxian's assertion inspired Ding Wei and Li Yunlong, and the two of them confirmed the direction of their graduation thesis during the exchange. After returning to the military academy, Li Yunlong continues to go to Zhang Bailu's place for appointments and even stays out at night after getting drunk.

The two of them are in the same room, and the two of them are in the same room. The company's main business is to provide a wide range of services and services to the public. However, after Feng Nan's advice, Tian Yu decided to go to Nanjing to recover Li Yunlong.

=== Episode 29 ===
The two of them are the same. However, Li Yunlong was deeply moved by Tian Yu's sincerity, and he told the truth about his relationship with Zhang Bailu.

At this point, Zhang Bailu suddenly appears, and after some conversation between the three of them, Li Yunlong finally chooses Tian Yu, and Zhang Bailu is heartbroken and leaves. Li Yunlong and Tian Yu go to Beijing to visit Feng Nan and Zhao Gang, and Li and Zhao get very drunk.

Zhao Gang's cynical personality makes Li Yunlong a little worried, and Zhao Gang's sense of justice and conscience makes Feng Nan worried all day long.

=== Episode 30 ===
Soon after Li Yunlong returned to Nanjing Military Academy, he and Kong Jie and Ding Wei had some problems with their superiors over the issue of their titles, so they didn't change into their May 5 uniforms during the assembly. The director of the academy criticized the three of them, and they admitted their mistakes and asked to participate in the National Day parade after completing their graduation thesis.

The three generals are deep in thought. Finally, Li Yunlong decided on the topic of his thesis: "On the military's will to fight - the spirit of Liangjian".

He was awarded the rank of Major General, the Medal of Independence and Freedom, the Medal of August 1 and the Medal of Liberation on the eve of his graduation. At the military parade in Tiananmen Square, Li Yunlong and his comrades slowly raised their right hands in salute to the military flag.

== Cast ==
=== Main ===
- Li Youbin as Li Yunlong
- He Zhengjun as Zhao Gang
- Zhang Guangbei as Chu Yunfei

=== Supporting ===
- You Li as Kong Jie
- Wang Quanyou as Ding Wei
- Zhang Tong as Wei Dayong
- Liang Linlin as Xiu Qin
- Tong Lei as Tian Yu
- Sun Li as Feng Nan

== Music ==
No.	Title	Lyrics	Music	Singers	Length
1.	"Soul of the Chinese Army (中国军魂)" (Opening theme)	Li Haiying	Li Haiying	Beijing Male Voice Choir

== Awards ==
Year	Award	Category	Result	Notes
2006	23rd China TV Golden Eagle Awards	Outstanding Television Award	Won	
2006	23rd China TV Golden Eagle Awards	Best Actor: Li Youbin	Won	
2006	23rd China TV Golden Eagle Awards	Favorite Actor: Li Youbin	Nominated	
2007	27th Flying Apsaras Awards	First-class of Outstanding Television Award	Won	
2007	27th Flying Apsaras Awards	Outstanding Actor: Li Youbin	Won	
2007	27th Flying Apsaras Awards	Outstanding Screenplay: Du Liang, Jiang Qitao	Won	
