= Zhang Jiayi =

Chinese actor (born 1970)

- Born: Zhang Xiaotong (张小童); April 8, 1970 (age 56); Xi'an, Shaanxi, China
- Education: Beijing Film Academy
- Occupation: Actor
- Years active: 1991–present
- Agent: Zhang Jiayi Studio (under ZOR Culture)
- Spouse: Wang Haiyan

Chinese name
- Traditional Chinese: 張嘉益
- Simplified Chinese: 张嘉益
Transcriptions
Standard Mandarin
- Hanyu Pinyin: Zhāng Jiā Yì

Zhang Jiayi (Chinese: 张嘉益; born 8 April 1970) is a Chinese actor. He rose to fame with his role in Dwelling Narrowness (2009). In 2014, he became the fourth Chinese actor to achieve the television "Grand Slam", having won Best Actor at China’s three most prestigious television awards, the Feitian Award, the Golden Eagle Award and the Magnolia Award.

== Early life and education ==
Zhang was born and raised in Xi'an, Shaanxi. Zhang was a student with merit on wrestle when he was in high school. After graduated from high school, he planned to be a professional wrestler. However, on the advice of his uncle, who worked at the Xi’an Film Studio, he decided to take the entrance examination for the Beijing Film Academy and was subsequently admitted. After graduating from the academy in 1991, he was assigned to Xi'an Film Studio.

== Career ==
Zhang played his first role as Kang Bosi in film Rubilks-clock in 1990, which is his first film. One year later, he graduated from Beijing Film Academy and changed his name from Zhang Xiaotong to Zhang Jiayi.

In 1995, Zhang played Zhang Jianguo in television series Daobei People which is his first time to appear in small screen.

Zhang in 1999 participated in film Xian's Finest and won Society Award at 7th Golden Phoenix Awards.

Zhang came back to Beijing from Xi'an in 2000. And he played Wu Dengyun in television series Dr. Wu in Pamir which was adapted from a true story and won the First Prize of television series at 21st Flying Apsaras Awards.

In 2004, Zhang played main role Song Chao in television series National Mission cooperated with actress Wang Haiyan.

Zhang gained attention and popularity and rose to fame with his role as Song Siming in television series Dwelling Narrowness in 2009.

Zhang won the Best Actor(Contemporary Drama) at 4th Huading Awards in 2010 due to television series I Am the Proprietor.

In 2011, Zhang won the Best Actor at 17th Magnolia Awards for his performing in television drama Borrow Gun. In hit film Love Is Not Blind, Zhang played as a supporting role.

In 2012, Zhang participated in television drama The Brink as main actor and artistic director. In May, he played as Liu Chenxi in hit television drama Angel Heart which was adapted from writer Liu Liu's novel. In September, he played as a police in television series Story of Police in Yingpan. Zhang won the Best Actor at 8th Huading Awards, 3rd Golden Lotus Awards and 4th China TV Drama Awards for his performing in The Brink. And he won the Best Actor at 29th Flying Apsaras Awards, 27th China TV Golden Eagle Award due to Story of Police in Yingpan. At 8th Huading Awards, he also won 10 Most Popular TV Celebrities of the year award.

Zhang played as main role in Life's Ups and Downs in 2013 and won the Best Actor at 19th Magnolia Awards. In the same year, he participated in film The Founding of a Party and won the Society Award at 14th Golden Phoenix Awards.

In 2014, Zhang played as main role in A Servant of Two Masters and won the Best Actor at 6th China TV Drama Awards. In Forty-nine Days Memorial, a television series which was adapted from writer Geling Yan's novel, Zhang Jiayi's performing won the Best Actor Award at 20th Asian Television Awards. Same year, Zhang participated in Chinese director Zhang Yimou's film Coming Home.

In 2015, Zhang participated in television series White Deer Plain as leading role and artistic director. He also played a guest role in hit drama Game of Hunting. At 1st China Quality Television Drama Ceremony, Zhang won the Most Expressive Actor award.
In 2016, Zhang played as main actor in contemporary drama My! Physical Education Teacher. Same year, he participated in Chinese director Feng Xiaogang's film I Am Not Madame Bovary, and was nominated for the Best Actor at 8th China Film Director's Guild Awards.

The drama White Deer Plain was allowed to broadcast in 2017. Due to this television drama, Zhang was nominated for Best Actor at 8th Golden Lotus Awards and 29th China TV Golden Eagle Awards. And he won the Best Actor at 4th Asia Rainbow TV Awards. In this year, he also played a main role in television drama Wonderful Life, and won Best Actor at 24th Huading Awards in 2018 for his performing in this drama.

== Personal life ==
=== Marriage ===
In 2004, during filming the television series National Mission, Zhang had a romance with actress Wang Haiyan. Three years later, in 2007, Zhang married Wang in his hometown Xi'an. This is his second marriage. On September 19, 2010, their first daughter was born, and was named Zhang Yixin.

=== Disease ===
In the beginning of 2018, a video about Zhang Jiayi in television series Wonderful Life went viral because of his unique walking posture. In fact, his unique walking posture is one of the symptoms of ankylosing spondylitis. The disease limits his actions so that sometimes he is unable to straighten his back. When he was 22, he felt the back pain, but did not pay much attention and still endured the pain to work, which made his illness more serious. According to his speech in CCTV program Voice, he was diagnosed with ankylosing spondylitis when he was 25.

== Filmography ==
=== Television series ===
| Year | English title | Chinese title | Role | Notes |
|---|---|---|---|---|
| 1990 | Nie Rongzhen | 聂荣臻 | Nie Rongzhen | |
| 1994 | Ai You Ru He | 爱又如何 | Shen Wei | |
| 1995 | Daobei People | 道北人 | Zhang Jianguo | |
| 1997 | The Old House | 老房子 | Xu Hao | |
| 1997 | Fighting for National Heirloom | 火线对峙 | Zhang Xueliang | |
| 1997 | Good Man | 好人难当 | Liu Donghai | |
| 1998 | Stories in Performing School | 表演系的故事 | Li Bing | |
| 1999 | Graduate Students | 毕业生 | Yang Zijiang | |
| 2000 | The Life Is Destined | 前世今生 | Su Yunfei | |
| 2001 | Dr. Wu in Pamir | 帕米尔医生 | Wu Dengyun | |
| 2002 | Cadre | 干部 | Bai Senlin | |
| 2002 | Fleeting Time | 不觉流水年长 | Sun Baoming | |
| 2002 | City of Hope | 希望之城 | Zhao Guoliang | |
| 2002 | Sunshine Lit the Soul | 照亮灵魂的阳光 | Gao Yu | |
| 2002 | Representative of Sunshine | 阳光代表 | Wu Shutian | |
| 2002 | Emphasis Detect | 立案侦查 | Ren Jichang | |
| 2003 | Heroic Legend | 萍踪侠影 | Zhang Fengfu | |
| 2003 | Greatest Building in The World | 天下第一楼 | Rui Ying | |
| 2003 | Behind the Truth | 真相的背后 | Zhang Xiaolong | |
| 2003 | Suddenly Turn Hostile | 变脸 | Qi Mingxuan | |
| 2004 | National Mission | 国家使命 | Song Chao | |
| 2004 | A Mission | 使命 | Lin Yin | |
| 2004 | 24 Hour Police Affair | 24小时警事 | Chen Yiming | |
| 2004 | Detective Ou | 探长欧光慈 | Hu Xiaodao | |
| 2005 | Remarriage of A Police Woman | 半路夫妻 | Jiang Jianping | |
| 2005 | Unbreakable | 生死劫 | Yuan Muye | |
| 2005 | Greatest Matchmaker in the World | 天下第一媒婆 | Zheng Wanjun | |
| 2005 | Farmers' Representative | 农民代表 | Xu Mingyuan | |
| 2005 | The Warmth | 温暖 | Yan Zhiguo | |
| 2006 | Marry for Love | 为爱结婚 | Zhu Yanfeng | |
| 2006 | Two-gun Li Xiangyang | 双枪李向阳 | Li Xiangyang | |
| 2006 | Agents on The 5th Group | 五号特工组 | Liu Tao | |
| 2006 | Worry in Woman | 女人心事 | You Wei | |
| 2006 | Cause Troubles Tracing | 肇事追踪 | Tang Guodong | |
| 2006 | The Jins | 妻室儿女 | Jin Shunqi | |
| 2006 | Jal sarabose | 好好过日子 | Chen Siwei | |
| 2007 | You Are Authorized to the Maintenance Slience | 你有权保持沉默 | Gu Zhongshi | |
| 2007 | No Bullet | 没有子弹 | Zang Junling | |
| 2007 | Ex-wife Comes Home | 前妻回家 | Li Xiang | |
| 2007 | I Am the Sun | 我是太阳 | Pang Ruofei | |
| 2007 | Behind Marriage | 婚姻背后 | Su Qin | |
| 2007 | The Image of A Nation | 国家形象 | Zhao Gang | |
| 2008 | Studio of Glorious Treasures | 百年荣宝斋 | Zhang Youlin | |
| 2008 | Great Trade Route | 大商道 | He Tianbao | |
| 2008 | Secret Train | 秘密列车 | Zheng Jucun | |
| 2008 | Living | 大生活 | Gao Ming | |
| 2008 | Military Doctor | 军医 | Zhang Shizhang | |
| 2009 | Dwelling Narrowness | 蜗居 | Song Siming | |
| 2009 | The Sacred Mission | 神圣使命 | Ma Qiming | |
| 2009 | I Am the Proprietor | 我是业主 | Fang Dongxu | |
| 2010 | Slience | 沉默 | Lin Yin | |
| 2010 | Xian Hua Duo Duo | 鲜花朵朵 | Dong Liangchen | |
| 2010 | Family | 瞧这一家子 | Liu Licheng | |
| 2010 | The Informant | 告密者 | Du Shengkui | |
| 2011 | Brothers | 你是我兄弟 | Ma Xuewu | |
| 2011 | Borrow Gun | 借枪 | Xiong Kuohai | |
| 2011 | Two-gun Li Xiangyang | 双枪李向阳之再战松岗 | Li Xiangyang | |
| 2011 | Please Forgive Me | 请你原谅我 | Zhang Yi | |
| 2011 | Xia Hai | 下海 | Chen Zhiping | |
| 2012 | The Brink | 悬崖 | Zhou Yi | |
| 2012 | Valley Of The Wolves | 雪狼谷 | Hao Guozhen | |
| 2012 | Angel Heart | 心术 | Liu Chenxi | |
| 2012 | Life's Ups and Downs | 浮沉 | Wang Guilin | |
| 2012 | Story of Police in Yingpan | 营盘镇警事 | Fan Dangyu | |
| 2014 | Marriage Secret | 结婚的秘密 | Guan Haotian | |
| 2014 | A Servant of Two Masters | 一仆二主 | Yang Shu | |
| 2014 | Deng Xiaoping at History's Crossroads | 历史转折中的邓小平 | Xi Zhongxun | |
| 2014 | True Man | 爷们儿 | Li Guosheng | |
| 2014 | Forty-nine Days Memorial | 四十九日·祭 | Fa Bi | |
| 2014 | Hua Hong Hua Huo | 花红花火 | Sheng Jiamen | |
| 2014 | The Merchants of Qing Dynasty | 大清盐商 | Wang Chaozong | |
| 2015 | Dare to Love | 敢爱 | Ren Woxing | Cameo |
| 2015 | For Love To | 妻子不设防 | Liang Tian | Cameo |
| 2015 | Truth And Trust | 后海不是海 | Shi Mo | |
| 2015 | The Direction of Happiness | 幸福双黄线 | Su Shizhang | |
| 2015 | Pretty Wife | 老婆大人是80后 | Dong Jinghui | |
| 2015 | Tumultuous Times Scholars | 乱世书香 | Xu Jianbo | |
| 2015 | Young Marshal | 少帅 | Li Daxhao | Cameo |
| 2016 | Transition From Liping | 生死黎平 | Tang Guoxun | |
| 2016 | The Red Flag Thrown into West Wind | 红旗漫卷西风 | Cheng Muxian | Cameo |
| 2017 | White Deer Plain | 白鹿原 | Bai Jiaxuan | |
| 2017 | Under Cover | 卧底归来 | Fang Qinglong | |
| 2017 | Emergency Department Doctors | 急诊科医生 | He Jianyi | |
| 2017 | Game of Hunting | 猎场 | Qu Minjing | Cameo |
| 2017 | My! Physical Education Teacher | 我的！体育老师 | Ma Ke | |
| 2017 | A Splendid Life in Beijing | 生逢灿烂的日子 | Guo Xiaohai | |
| 2018 | Blossoms in Dream | 花开如梦 | Meng Yunong | |
| 2018 | Collision | 大叔与少年 | Yang Jinggang | |
| 2018 | Love is Leaving | 安娜的爱人 | Lin Fu | |
| 2018 | Wonderful Life | 美好生活 | Xu Tian | |
| 2019 | Novoland: Eagle Flag | 九州缥缈录 | Baili Jinghong | |
| 2019 | Growing Pain | 少年派 | Lin Dawei | |
| 2020 | Together | 在一起 | Zhang Hanqing | |
| 2020 | The Stage | 我待生活如初恋 | Diao Shunzi | |
| 2021 | Minning Town | 闽宁镇 | Ma Hanshui | |
| 2021 | Love is beautiful | 对你的爱很美 | Wang Dashan | |
| 2022 | | 战上海 | | |

=== Film ===
| year | English title | Chinese title | role | notes |
|---|---|---|---|---|
| 1990 | Rubilks-clock | 魔表 | Kang Bosi | |
| 1991 | Nie Qing | 孽情 | Shui Gen | |
| 1991 | Zao Yu Ji Qing | 遭遇激情 | Tang Da Xian | |
| 1992 | The Cruel Summer Time | 残酷夏日 | Guo Rong | |
| 1992 | A Man or A Monkey | 人猴大裂变 | Zhen Ping | |
| 1994 | Dirt | 头发乱了 | Zheng Weidong | |
| 1994 | Back to Back, Face to Face | 背靠背脸对脸 | Shi Jingli | Cameo |
| 1996 | Ba Ba Bie Pian Wo | 爸爸，你别骗我 | The college student | |
| 1996 | Ambush | 埋伏 | Yang Gao | |
| 1997 | Bearing Father to School | 背起爸爸上学 | Gao Laoshi | |
| 1997 | My Wife, My Boss | 给太太打工 | Chen Shaoyu | |
| 1997 | Superconductor | 超导 | Ge Jingli | |
| 1997 | Xian's Finest | 睡不着 | Li Suozhang | |
| 1999 | People in Macau | 澳门儿女 | Li Fanding | |
| 2000 | Wei Xian Guan Xi | 危险关系 | Li Rui | |
| 2001 | Li Qiushi | 李秋实 | Wang Zhicheng | |
| 2001 | The Dream of A Young Soldier | 高原如梦 | Zhi Daoyuan | |
| 2001 | Plain Shots | 平原枪声 | Zheng Jingzhi | |
| 2001 | Sanyan and ErPai: Lian Jin Shu | 拍案惊奇之炼金术 | Pan Dasheng | |
| 2005 | Eat Hot Tofu Slowly | 心急吃不了热豆腐 | Ye Lang | |
| 2007 | Feng Zhiyuan | 冯志远 | Feng Zhiyuan | |
| 2008 | In Love We Trust | 左右 | Xiao Lu | |
| 2009 | One Night in Supermarket | 夜·店 | The robber | |
| 2010 | Chongqing Blues | 日照重庆 | Liu Cheng | |
| 2011 | The Founding of a Party | 建党伟业 | Li Daozhao | |
| 2011 | Love Is Not Blind | 失恋33天 | Da Laowang | |
| 2012 | All for Love | 三个未婚妈妈 | Liu Erbiao | |
| 2013 | Going to Lhasa | 去拉萨 | Lu Bocheng | |
| 2013 | Angry Kid | 愤怒的小孩 | Sun Jianye | |
| 2013 | A Touch of Sin | 天注定 | Xiaoyu's lover | |
| 2014 | Coming Home | 归来 | Wang Yisheng | |
| 2014 | The Golden Era | 黄金时代 | Zhou Jingwen | |
| 2014 | The Crossing | 太平轮 | Lei Fu | |
| 2016 | I Am Not Madame Bovary | 我不是潘金莲 | Ma Wenbin | |
| 2019 | My People, My Country | 我和我的祖国 | | |
| 2019 | At Last | 玩命三日 | | |

==== Animation film ====
| year | English title | Chinese title | role | notes |
|---|---|---|---|---|
| 2014 | The Legend of Qin | 秦时明月之龙腾万里 | Wei Zhuang | |

== Awards and nominations ==
| Year | Award | Category | Nominated work | Result | Ref. |
Major awards
| 1999 | 7th Golden Phoenix Awards | Society Award | Xian's Finest | Won | |
| 2011 | 17th Shanghai Television Festival | Best Actor | Borrow Gun | Won | |
| 2012 | 18th Shanghai Television Festival | Best Actor | The Brink | Nominated | |
| 2012 | 8th Huading Awards | Best Actor | The Brink | Won | |
| 2013 | 19th Shanghai Television Festival | Best Actor | Life's Ups and Downs | Won | |
| 2013 | 14th Golden Phoenix Awards | Society Award | The Founding of a Party | Won | |
| 2017 | 8th China Film Director's Guild Awards | Best Actor | I Am Not Madame Bovary | Nominated | |
| 2018 | 24th Shanghai Television Festival | Best Actor | White Deer Plain | Nominated | |
| 2018 | 24th Huading Awards | Best Actor | Wonderful Life | Won | |
| 2021 | 27th Shanghai Television Festival | Best Actor | The Stage | Nominated | |
| 2021 | 27th Shanghai Television Festival | Best Supporting Actor | Minning Town | Nominated | |
Film and television awards
| 2010 | 4th Huading Awards | Best Actor(Contemporary Drama) | I Am the Proprietor | Won | |
| 2012 | 8th Huading Awards | 10 Most Popular TV Celebrities | —N/a | Won | |
| 2012 | 3rd Golden Lotus Awards | Best Actor | The Brink | Won | |
| 2012 | 4th China TV Drama Awards | Best Actor | The Brink | Won | |
| 2013 | 29th Flying Apsaras Awards | Best Actor | Story of Police in Yingpan | Won | |
| 2014 | 27th China TV Golden Eagle Award | Best Actor | Story of Police in Yingpan | Won | |
| 2014 | 10th China Golden Eagle TV Arts Festival | Most Popular Actor | Story of Police in Yingpan | Won | |
| 2014 | iQiyi All-Star Carnival | Best Television Actor | —N/a | Won | |
| 2014 | 6th China TV Drama Awards | Best Actor | A Servant Of Two Masters | Won | |
| 2015 | 1st China Quality Television Drama Ceremony | Most Expressive Actor | —N/a | Won | |
| 2015 | 20th Asian Television Awards | Best Actor | Forty-nine Days Memorial | Won | |
| 2017 | 8th Golden Lotus Awards | Best Actor | White Deer Plain | Nominated | |
| 2018 | 29th China TV Golden Eagle Award | Best Actor | White Deer Plain | Nominated | |
| 2019 | 4th Asia Rainbow TV Awards | Best Actor | White Deer Plain | Won | |
| 2019 | 6th The Actors of China Award Ceremony | Best Actor (Sapphire Category) | Growing Pain | Nominated | |
| 2019 | Golden Bud - The Fourth Network Film And Television Festival | Best Actor | Growing Pain | Nominated | |
| 2020 | 7th The Actors of China Award Ceremony | Best Actor (Sapphire) | —N/a | Nominated | |
| 2022 | 33rd Flying Apsaras Awards | Outstanding Actor | The Stage | Nominated | |
Others
| 2010 | New Weekly 2009 China TV Rank | Person of the Year | —N/a | Won | |
| 2011 | Beijing News Oriental Fashion 2011 50 Most Beautiful Chinese | Best TV Actor of the Year | —N/a | Won | |
| 2011 | BQ Hot Search Artist | Most Valuable Actor of the Year | —N/a | Won | |

=== Forbes China Celebrity 100 ===
| Year | Rank | Ref. |
|---|---|---|
| 2011 | 96th | |
| 2012 | 51st | |
| 2015 | 40th | |
| 2017 | 93rd | |
| 2019 | 50th | |
| 2020 | 67th | |
