= Jiao Yulu =

Chinese politician

- 焦裕禄
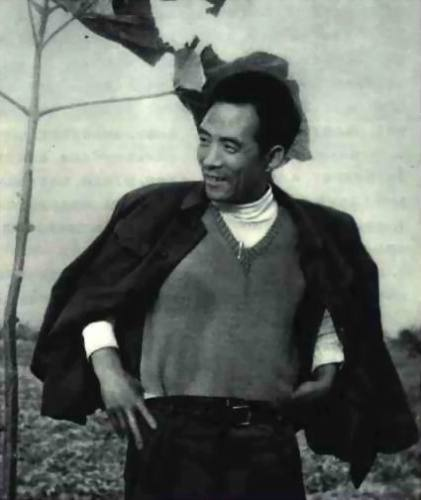
- Jiao Yulu

Communist Party Secretary of Lankao County
- In office October 1962 – May 1964
- Preceded by: Wang Jinbi
- Succeeded by: Zhou Huamin

Communist Party Secretary of Weishi County
- In office June 1962 – October 1962

Personal details
- Born: 16 August 1922 Yuanquan Town, Boshan District, Zibo, Shandong, China
- Died: 14 May 1964 (aged 41) Zhengzhou, Henan, China
- Party: Chinese Communist Party
- Spouse: Xu Junya
- Children: 6
- Parent: Jiao Fangtian (father)

Chinese name
- Traditional Chinese: 焦裕祿
- Simplified Chinese: 焦裕禄
Transcriptions
Standard Mandarin
- Hanyu Pinyin: Jiāo Yùlù

Jiao Yulu (Chinese: 焦裕禄; 16 August 1922 – 14 May 1964) was a Chinese politician. Jiao Yulu was considered to be an example of Mao Zedong's good student during the period of Mao's personality cult. After his death, a campaign to study Jiao Yulu's example was started in 1966. The aim of the campaign was to boost morale and to rally the people to work harder to overcome difficulties. Chinese Communist Party members in particular were called upon to follow Jiao Yulu's example by conducting more research and investigations into local conditions, and learn from his leadership style.

== Life and career ==
Jiao Yulu was born in Yuanquan Town of Boshan District, in Zibo city, in Shandong province, to a poor family, on August 16, 1922, during the Republic of China. Both his father Jiao Fangtian (焦方田) and mother were farmers. He had only four years of schooling. His father hanged himself during the Second Sino-Japanese War. Jiao Yulu was conscripted into the Japanese labor and he was sent to coal-mining in Fushun, Liaoning, Manchoukuo. He escaped to Suqian, Jiangsu in the fall of 1943. He had been a farm labourer for two years for the landowner Hu Tairong (胡泰荣).

In 1945, after the defeat of the Japanese in the Second World War, he returned his hometown and joined a militia. He once took part in the battle of liberating Boshan District. Jiao Yulu joined the Chinese Communist Party (CCP) in January 1946, and he soon was transferred to Bohai, Shandong and appointed a group leader of the Land Reform movement. By late Chinese Civil War, he worked in Weishi County, Henan province until 1951. In June 1953, he was transferred to Luoyang Mine Machine Manufacturing Plant and worked there until 1962.

In June 1962, he was appointed CCP Committee Secretary of Weishi County. In December, he became the Second Communist Party Secretary of Lankao County. The county had long been plagued by dust storms, waterlogging, and alkaline lands. Jiao Yulu mobilized the local residents to contend with the poor natural conditions. Due to years of toil, Jiao Yulu broke down from constant overwork and he was diagnosed with liver cancer. But he continued his struggle against natural disasters. On May 14, 1964, he died of liver cancer, aged 42.

On February 1, 1966, Henan Provincial People's Government awarded him the title of "Revolutionary Martyr".

== Personal life ==
Jiao Yulu married Xu Junya (徐俊雅; 1932–2005), a female politician from Weishi County, Henan province. They had three sons and three daughters.

- Sons: Jiao Guoqing (焦国庆), Jiao Yuejin (焦跃进), Jiao Baogang (焦保钢)
- Daughters: Jiao Shoufeng (焦守凤), Jiao Shouyun (焦守云), Jiao Shoujun (焦守军)

Party political offices
Preceded by Wang Jinbi	Communist Party Secretary of Lankao County; 1962–1964	Succeeded by Zhou Huamin
