= White Deer Plain (film) =

2011 film

- Film poster
- Directed by: Wang Quan'an
- Screenplay by: Wang Quan'an; Lu Wei; Shen Jie
- Based on: White Deer Plain by Chen Zhongshi
- Produced by: Zhang Xiaoke; Wang Qingyong; Lu Jun
- Starring: Zhang Fengyi
- Cinematography: Lutz Reitemeier
- Edited by: Wang Quan'an
- Music by: Zhao Jiping
- Production companies: Bai Lu Yuan Film Company; Lightshades Film Productions; Xi'an Movie and Television Production Co.; Western Film Group Corporation
- Release date: 12 November 2011
- Running time: 188 minutes 220 minutes (director's cut)
- Country: China
- Language: Mandarin

White Deer Plain (Chinese: 白鹿原; pinyin: Bái Lù Yuán) is a 2011 Chinese drama film directed by Wang Quan'an and based on the novel of the same name by Chen Zhongshi. The film competed in competition for the Golden Bear at the 62nd Berlin International Film Festival, where Lutz Reitemeier was awarded a Silver Bear for Outstanding Artistic Contribution (Photography).

The film focuses primarily on Bai Juaxian, his son Xiaowen and Hei Wa up to the point of the war with Japan. Many of the other characters in the novel are not mentioned.

== Plot ==
Bai Juaxian is the elder of a rural village on White Deer Plain. He treats his farm hand Lu San as a brother and considers his son Xiaowen and Lu San's son Hei Wa brothers. When the cart delivering the village's grain contributions to the Emperor returns, they learn that the Emperor has been replaced by the Nationalist (KMT) government. A drunk Lu Zilin later returns to the village to report he has a position as an official. During a dinner celebration, villagers report that there is trouble with the KMT. Juaxian leads the villages in a confrontation with a small KMT contingent and is successful in driving them off.

In 1920, Lu Zilin's eldest son Lu Ziaopeng is about to be married off in an arranged marriage. Ziaopeng runs off before the wedding. Hei Wa also runs off because of an impending marriage arranged by Bai Juaxian. Hei Wa gets work as a hired hand with a wealthy family. The patriarch of the family is elderly but his concubine Tian Xiao-er is young, attractive and vital. She has an affair with Hei Wa. They are caught and tortured and left for dead in a field. Hei Wa returns with Xiao-er to White Deer Plain. They are allowed to marry but they are not allowed to honor their ancestors at the village shrine. This was Bai Juaxian's direction. When Hei Wa returns home he is cast out by his father. Meanwhile, Zhaopeng has returned as a teacher at the local school. The KMT arrives at the village and demands their grain tribute. They threaten to shoot Juaxian if he does not comply. Hei Wa with the help of Zhaopeng set fire to the fields at night. The KMT execute a villager as an example. Hei Wa with the support of Ziaopeng decide to raid the ancestral hall and arrest and parade several local villages for corruption. One of the arrested villages collapses and dies.

In 1927, the police seek to arrest Hei Wa and Zhaopeng. They escape but Hei Wa leaves Xiao-er behind. Lu Zilin tries to rape Xiao-er but is interrupted by what they believe to be Hei Wa calling out the distance. Hei Wa returns and is captured by the villagers. They decide to punish Hei Wa and Xiao-er by whipping. Xiaowen had to carry out the punishment. Hei Wa is allowed to escape (from the police). Lu Zilin then suggest to Xiao-er that the Bai family is source for all their misfortunes. He proposes that Xiao-er take revenge through Xiaowen. Xiao-er then seduces Xiaowen. Xiaowen would visit Xiao-er regularly and they are caught by Juaxian. Juaxian punishes Xiaowen by whipping him at the ancestral hall. Xiaowen decides to stay with Xiao-er. They become opium addicts and become destitute. When the famine hits White Deer Plain they are desperate for food. Xiaowen sees a recruiting line for the CCP and decide to enroll. He asks to bring the money he is given home to Xiao-er but is denied. They do not let him leave and he is taken away. Lu San sees him and tries to help but he is beaten by the CCP soldiers. Xiaowen gives Lu San the money he was given for Xiao-er.

Lu San visits Xiao-er and gives her food. He kills her and causes the building she lived in to collapse. Lu Zilin is arrested by the police for being an official as he is wanted by the current government.

Hei Wa returns to White Deer Plain and is now the leader of a gang. He wants retribution for Xiao-er and threatens Juaxian with a knife. Juaxian tells him he did not kill Xiao-er. Hei Wa's father Lu San interrupts. Lu San admits to killing Xiao-er and said she was the cause of their ruin. Hei Wa spares his father and beats Juaxian before leaving.

Later Hei Wa finds that Lu San has hanged himself.

In 1938, the village is interrupted by Japanese aircraft overhead as everyone runs for cover. As the aircraft attack Lu Zilin returns to the village in a cart. After the bombing subsides, Juaxian is calling for Zilin but there is no response.

== Cast ==
- Zhang Fengyi as Bai Jiaxuan
- Zhang Yuqi as Tian Xiao'e
- Gang Wu as Lu Zilin
- Duan Yihong as Hei Wa
