= Chen Zhongshi =

Chinese writer (1942–2016)

- 陈忠实
- Born: 3 August 1942; Xi'an, Shaanxi, China
- Died: 29 April 2016 (aged 73); Xi'an, Shaanxi, China
- Occupation: Novelist
- Writing career
- Language: Chinese
- Period: 1965–2016
- Genres: Novel, prose
- Notable work: White Deer Field
- Notable awards: 4th Mao Dun Literary Prize; 1996 White Deer Field

Chen Zhongshi (simplified Chinese: 陈忠实; traditional Chinese: 陳忠實; pinyin: Chén Zhōngshí; 3 August 1942 – 29 April 2016) was a Chinese author. He started writing prose in 1965 and finished his magnum opus White Deer Field in 1993 (for which he won the Mao Dun Literature Prize in 1997). In 1979, he became a member of the Chinese Writers Association (which he at one point served as the association's vice chairman).

== Biography ==
Chen was born in Xi'an, Shaanxi on 3 August 1942. After graduating from No. 34 High School of Xi'an in 1962, he got a teaching job in primary school and, after two years, became a senior high school teacher. In 1966, Chen joined the Chinese Communist Party. He was interested in literature and soon began devoting himself to a writing career.

Chen became the vice director of Culture Bureau of Baqiao District of Xi'an in 1980. He served as a member of the Writers Association of Shaanxi, becoming vice president in 1985 and chairman in 1993. Between 2001 and 2006, he was the vice president of the Chinese Writers Association.

Chen died on 29 April 2016 at the age of 73 in Xi'an.

== Works ==
=== Short stories ===
- Trust (信任)
- Country (乡村)
- Early Summer (初夏)
- The courtyard of the Kangs (康家小院)

=== Novels ===
- White Deer Field(白鹿原)
  - White Deer Field, which has a large following in China, as of 2016, had not been translated into English.

=== Reportage ===
- "渭北高原，關於一個人的記憶"
