= Li Youbin =

Chinese actor

- Born: 15 February 1958 (age 68); Changchun, Jilin, China
- Education: Shanghai Theatre Academy
- Occupation: Actor
- Years active: 1985–present
- Agent: Liangce Media
- Spouse(s): Zhang Ruiqi (former); Shi Lanya
- Children: A son
- Family: Li Yeping

Chinese name
- Chinese: 李幼斌
Transcriptions
Standard Mandarin
- Hanyu Pinyin: Lǐ Yòubīn

Li Youbin (Chinese: 李幼斌; born 15 February 1958) is a Chinese actor known for his roles in military dramas. He is particularly known for playing the role of Li Yunlong in the war drama Drawing Sword based on the eponymous novel by Chinese writer Duliang (都梁). In 2006, along with seven other actors, he received the Audience's Favorite Actor award at the Golden Eagle Awards.

== Early life and education ==
Li was born into a family of workers in Kuancheng District of Changchun, Jilin, on February 15, 1958. He has four siblings. His elder sister Li Yeping (李野萍) is also an actress. Li attended the Changchun No. 11 High School.

In 1995, Li moved to Beijing with his family. In 2002, Li was transferred to the August First Film Studio.

== Personal life ==
Li is twice married. At the age of 16, Li was admitted to a drama troupe and met Zhang Ruiqi (张瑞琪), who he married in 1984. Their son Li Xiaoke (李小珂) was born in 1985. In 2006, the two divorced.

Li began dating actress Shi Lanya (史兰芽) in 2003 after they first met while appearing in Chinese drama Jiang Shan. They married in 2008. Shi is 13 years younger than Li and has been married twice.

== Filmography ==
=== Film ===
Year	English title	Chinese title	Role	Notes
1985	Si zheng	死证	Fang Shusheng (方树森)	
1988	Heaven Drum	天鼓	Yu Tian (于天)	
1989	Men Coming to the Execution Ground	老少爷们上法场	Qiang Juren (强举人)	
1990	Fight at the Imperial Tomb	血泊皇陵	Xu Jin (徐进)	
1990	War of Information on the Isolated Island	孤岛情报战	Liu Jianfeng (刘建丰)	
1991	Hotline	热线电话	Song Ancheng (宋安成)	
1992	Successors of the Great Yu	大禹的传人	Zheng Haifeng (郑海峰)	
1992	Edeke xue jiu	俄德克血酒	Liuhan Wu (刘汉五)	
1993	Jun lie sha chu zhong wei	军列杀出重围	Zhong Ye (中野)	
1994	Sha ji si fu	杀机四伏	Yang Zhigang (扬子江)	
1995	Flying Tigers	飞虎队	Qin Xiong (秦雄)	
1998	Run for the Village Head	竞选村长	Zhang Changshun (张长顺)	
2000	Roaring Across the Horizon	横空出世	Lu Guangda (陆光达)	
2003	Jingtaohailang	惊涛骇浪	Zhang Ziming (张子明)	
2004	Profoundly Affecting	惊心动魄	Marshal	
2005	On the Mountain of Tai Hang	太行山上	Zhu Huaibing (朱怀冰)	
2006	Qing nuan wan jia	情暖万家	Zhang Yungsheng (章云生)	
2007	My Left Hand	我的左手	Teacher	
2008	Jing tian dong di	惊天动地	Liang Zhidong (梁志东)	
2010	Feitian	飞天	Commander	
2011	Du jiang! Du jiang!	渡江!渡江!	He Xiaojiang (和小江)	
2012	Loyalty and Betrayal	忠诚与背叛	Weapons factory owner	
2013	The Sweet Smile	雷锋的微笑	Luo Ruiqing	
2019		九条命		
2019	The Bugle from Gutian	古田军号	boss of paper mill	
2019	The Secret of China	红星照耀中国		

=== Television ===
Year	English title	Chinese title	Role	Notes
1992	The Ebb and Flow	—N/a	Lu Mingkuan (鲁明宽)	
1995	Bolshevik Brothers	布尔什维克兄弟	Li Shuichang (刘水长)	
2005–2006	Drawing Sword	亮剑	Li Yunlong	
2008	Pathfinding to the Northeast	—N/a	Zhu Kaishan	
2009	In a place far far away	在遥远的地方	Wei Tie	
2012	Yan has a daughter who doesn't worry about marriage	老严有女不愁嫁	Yan Chaling (严查令)	
2014	Bodyguard of the Love	爱的保镖	Sun Haishan (孙海山)	
2015	Don't Let Me Find It	别让我看见	Liu Yusheng (刘玉生)	
2015	The Happiness of Sun laojue	孙老倔的幸福	Sunlao Jue (孙老倔)	
2017	Juézhàn jiāng qiáo	决战江桥	Ma Zhanshan	
2019	In Law We Believe	因法之名	Ge Dajie	
2019		反恐特战队之天狼	Wang Duo	
