= 35th Golden Rooster Awards =

2022 Chinese film awards ceremony

- Official poster
- Date: November 13, 2022
- Site: Xiamen International Conference & Exhibition Center; Xiamen, China
- Organized by: China Film Association

Highlights
- Best Feature Film: The Battle at Lake Changjin
- Best Direction: Chen Kaige, Tsui Hark and Dante Lam; The Battle at Lake Changjin
- Best Actor: Zhu Yilong; Lighting Up the Stars
- Best Actress: Xi Meijuan; Song of Spring

Television coverage
- Network: CCTV

The 35th Golden Rooster Awards (Chinese: 第35届中国电影金鸡奖) honored the best Chinese language films of 2021 and 2022. The award ceremony was held in Xiamen, Fujian, China, and broadcast by CCTV-6.

== Winners and nominees ==
| Best Picture | Best Director |
|---|---|
| The Battle at Lake Changjin; Myth of Love; Sniper; Nice View; Lighting Up the Stars; My Country, My Parents | Chen Kaige, Tsui Hark and Dante Lam for The Battle at Lake Changjin; Longman Leung for Anita; Wen Muye for Nice View; Xue Xiaolu for Embrace Again; Zhang Yimou and Zhang Mo for Sniper |
| Best Actor | Best Actress |
| Zhu Yilong for Lighting Up the Stars; Shen Teng for Moon Man; Wu Jing for The Battle at Lake Changjin; Xu Zheng for Myth of Love; Jackson Yee for Nice View | Xi Meijuan for Song of Spring; Ni Ni for Yanagawa; Louise Wong for Anita; Yang Enyou for Lighting Up the Stars; Yang Xiucuo for Black Tent |
| Best Supporting Actor | Best Supporting Actress |
| Xin Baiqing for Yanagawa; Chen Minghao for Be Somebody; Yang Chengcheng for Goodbye! The Groundhog; Zhou Yemang for Myth of Love; Zhu Yawen for The Battle at Lake Changjin | Qi Xi for Nice View; Han Xin for Peach Blossoms in Fan/ The Chanting Willows; Liu Dan for Upcoming Summer; Wu Yue for Myth of Love; Yu Hui for A Man of the People |
| Best Writing | Best Editing |
| Shao Yihui for Myth of Love; Lan Xiaolong and Huang Jianxin for The Battle at Lake Changjin; Wang Xingdong for A Man of the People; Zhang Lü for Yanagawa; Zhou Chucen, Xiu Mengdi, Wen Muye, Han Xiaodan, and Zhong Wei for Nice View | Huang Qiongyi for Myth of Love; Li Yongyi for Sniper; Mai Zishan, Li Dianshi, and He Yongwei for The Battle at Lake Changjin; Zhang Yifan and Kuang Zhiliang for Embrace Again; Zhu Lin, Wei Yong, and Gaoqiong Jiali for Lighting Up the Stars |
| Best Cinematography | Best Art Direction |
| Zhao Xiaodong for Sniper; Du Jie for Moon Man; Liu Yin for Mozart from Space; Wang Boxue for Nice View; Zhao Yuqing for Lighting Up the Stars | Li Miao for Moon Man; Li Anran for Be Somebody; Lu Wei, Lin Weijian, He Zhiheng, Huo Tingxiao for The Battle at Lake Changjin; Wang Kuo for Mozart from Space |
| Best Music | Best Sound Recording |
| Peng Fei for Moon Man; Chen Xi and Dong Dongdong for Sniper; Hualun Band for Before Next Spring; Wang Zhiyi, Elliot Leung, and Li Ye for The Battle at Lake Changjin; Zhong Zhirong and Zhang Zhaohong for Detective vs Sleuths | Yang Jiang and Zhao Nan for Sniper; Du-Che Tu and Wu Shuyao for Anita; Wang Gang and Liu Xiaosha for Lighting Up the Stars; Wen Bo for Myth of Love; Xie Yaozhan for Detective vs Sleuths |
| Best Directorial Debut | Best Low-budget Feature |
| Liu Jiangjiang for Lighting Up the Stars; Li Geng for Before Next Spring; Liuxun Zimo for Be Somebody; Xing Wenxiong for Too Cool to Kill; Yang Chengcheng for Goodbye! The Groundhog | Yanagawa; Balintana; Ox King; Oroqen Hunter |
| Best Animated Feature | Best Children's Film |
| Boonie Bears: Back to Earth; The First Superhero: Monkey King; Goldbeak; Pleasant Goat and Big Big Wolf: Dunk for Future; Run, Tiger Run! | Goodbye! The Groundhog; Potato Flavored Ice Cream; So Long Summer Vacation; Mozart from Space; Echo to the Clouds |
| Best Chinese Opera Film | Best Documentary |
| Dunhuang Daughter; The Story of Gu Wenchang; The Gathering of Heroes: Borrowing the Easterly; Cai Wenji Returns to Her Homeland; Catch and Release Cao Cao | Remembering 1950; Hard Love; Cheer Up, Folks; Hear the Light; To the Summit |
| Best Foreign Language Film | Special Jury Prize |
| Father; Ice 2; We Made a Beautiful Bouquet; Downton Abbey: A New Era; The Banker | My Country, My Parents |
