= Priest bibliography =

List of written works by Priest

- Novels↙: 31
- Stories↙: 6
- Essays↙: 1

Priest is a pseudonymous Chinese author of fiction catered to women. She has published more than thirty novels since 2007.

== Novels ==
- (2007) Guǎng Zé Jiù Shì: Jǐn Yáng Piān (广泽旧事：锦阳篇)
- (2009) Guǎng Zé Jiù Shì Shàng Huá Piān (广泽旧事上华篇)
- (2009) Nì Lǚ Lái Guī (逆旅来归)
- (2009) Yī Shù Rén Shēng (一树人生)
- (2010) Huài Dào (坏道)
- (2010) Qī Yé (七爷, "Seventh Master")
- (2010) Liú Guāng Shí Wǔ Nián (流光十五年)
- (2010) Tiān Yá Kè (天涯客, "Faraway Wanderers")
- (2011) Zhōngjí Lányìn (终极蓝印)
- (2011) Jǐn Sè (锦瑟)
- (2011) Yóuyī (游医)
- (2011) Zuìhòu De Shǒuwèi (最后的守卫)
- (2012) Dà Zhàn Tuō Yán Zhèng (大战拖延症)
- (2012) Shòu Cóng Zhī Dāo (兽丛之刀)
- (2012) Zhèn Hún (镇魂); English translation: Guardian (2023)
- (2012) Zī Běn Jiàn Kè (资本剑客, "Capitalist Swordsman")
- (2013) Dà Gē (大哥, "Big Brother")
- (2013) Dà Yīng Xióng Shí Dài (大英雄时代)
- (2014) Liù Yáo (六爻); English translation: Coins of Destiny (2024)
- (2014) Shān Hé Biǎo Lǐ (山河表里)
- (2014) Tuō Guǐ (脱轨, "Derailment")
- (2015) Shā Pò Láng (杀破狼); English translation: Stars of Chaos (2023)
- (2015) Guòmén (过门)
- (2015) Yǒu Fěi (有匪, "Bandits")
- (2016) Mò Dú (默读); English translation: Silent Reading (2025)
- (2017) Cán Cì Pǐn (残次品); English translation: The Defectives (2025)
- (2018) Wú Wūrǎn, Wú Gōnghài (无污染、无公害)
- (2019) Liè Huǒ Jiāo Chóu (烈火浇愁); English translation: Drowning Sorrows in Raging Fire (2025)
- (2021) Tài Suì (太岁)
- (2022) Qiáo Tóu Lóu Shàng (桥头楼上)
- (2024) Chún Bái è Mó (纯白恶魔)

== Short stories ==
- (2008) Mèng Jì (梦祭, "Dream Sacrifice")
- (2009) Yuè Guāng Càn Làn Chǒu Xiǎo Yā (月光灿烂丑小鸭)
- (2009) Yī Qiān Nián Yǐ Hòu (一千年以后, "A Thousand Years Later")
- (2013) Hēi Sè Fāng Zhōu (黑色方舟, "Black Ark"), published in The Locked Room (上锁的房间)
- (2014) Gǒu (狗, "Dog")
- (2015) Cì Shā (刺杀, "Assassinate"), published in Machine Fantasy: A Dream of Steampunk (机械幻想- 蒸汽朋克之梦)

== Essays ==
- (2010) 21 Suì (21岁, "21 Years Old")
