= Broadcasting Girl =

- Directed by: Cheng Zhonghao; Wang Kai
- Starring: Jiro Wang; Qi Wei; Angela Qiu; Jiang Xueming
- Release date: May 20, 2014
- Running time: 96 minutes
- Country: China
- Language: Mandarin
- Box office: US$1.80 million

Broadcasting Girl (Chinese: 我的播音系女友) is a 2014 Chinese romantic comedy film directed by Cheng Zhonghao and Wang Kai.

== Cast ==
- Jiro Wang
- Qi Wei
- Angela Qiu
- Jiang Xueming

== Reception ==
The film has grossed US$1.80 million at the Chinese box office.
