= Lighting Up the Stars =

Lighting Up The Stars
- Film poster
- Chinese: 人生大事
- Hanyu Pinyin: rénshēng dàshì
- Directed by: Liu Jiangjiang
- Screenplay by: Liu Jiangjiang; Yu Min
- Produced by: Han Yan
- Starring: Zhu Yilong; Yang Enyou
- Cinematography: Zhao Yuqing
- Edited by: Zhu Lin; Wei Yong; Gao Qiongjiali
- Music by: Ji Yuan; Nana Wang
- Production companies: Lian Ray Pictures; Hengdian Entertainment Co., Ltd.; China Film Co., Ltd.
- Distributed by: China Film Co., Ltd.
- Release date: June 24, 2022 (Mainland China)
- Running time: 112 minutes
- Country: China
- Language: Mandarin (Sichuan dialect)
- Budget: $8 million (including marketing and promotion)
- Box office: $253.8 million

Lighting Up the Stars (Chinese: 人生大事; pinyin: Rénshēng Dàshì; lit. 'Life Events') is a 2022 Chinese drama film written and directed by Liu Jiangjiang, starring Zhu Yilong and Yang Enyou. The film follows the story of a mortician released from prison who meets an orphan during a funeral, which unexpectedly changes his attitude towards career and life.

The film premiered in China on 24 June 2022. The total box office of the film is 1.712 billion yuan, ranking the 4th in China's 2022 box office list.

== Plot ==
Mortician Mo Sanmei (played by Zhu Yilong) meets orphan Wu Xiaowen (played by Yang Enyou) during a funeral shortly after his release from prison. With reluctance, Mo takes care of Xiaowen and this decision burdens Mo further on top of his existing life problems. After a series of mishaps, this unlikely father-daughter pair develops a special relationship, and it changes how Mo views his job as a mortician and life.

== Cast ==
- Zhu Yilong as Mo Sanmei, a mortician.
- Yang Enyou as Wu Xiaowen, an orphan.
- Wang Ge as Wang Jianren, a mortician and assistant to Mo Sanmei.
- Liu Lu as Yin Baixue, a mortician who plays the suona.
- Luo Jingmin as Old Mo, Mo Sanmei's father.
- Zheng Weili as Madam Mo, Mo Sanmei's elder sister.
- Janice Wu as Xi Xi, Mo Sanmei's ex-girlfriend.
- Chen Chuang as Uncle Wu, Wu Xiaowen's uncle.
- Li Chunyuan as Wu Haifei, Wu Xiaowen's mother.
- Zhou Dan as Aunt, Wu Xiaowen's aunt.
- Wang Aizhi as Grandmother, Wu Xiaowen's maternal grandmother.

== Soundtrack ==
| No. | Title | Lyrics | Music | Singer(s) | Length |
|---|---|---|---|---|---|
| 1. | "Lighting Up the Stars (人生大事)" (Opening theme) | Zhao Zhao | Zhao Zhao | Zhao Zhao |
| 2. | "People Who Grow Stars (种星星的人)" (Ending theme) | Li Shutong | John Pond Ordway | Zhu Yilong/ Yang Enyou |
| 3. | "Search for Child Year after year (寻儿记一年复年)" (Interlude) | | | Zhang Qiaozhen |
| 4. | "A Happy Event in the World (人间喜事)" (Interlude) | Xia Xiaozhi | Wang Nana | Xia Xiaozhi |
| 5. | "Go to Heaven (上天堂)" (Interlude) | Liang Long | Liang Long | Second Hand Rose |

== Production ==
Liu Jiangjiang began to write the screenplay in 2019, which was inspired by the funeral culture in north China. Han Yan (director) read Liu Jiangjiang's drafts and gave notes for improvement.

Lighting Up the Stars began production on 27 May 2021, in Wuhan and finished filming on 1 August.

== Release ==
Lighting Up the Stars was slated for release on 2 April 2022 (Qingming Festival), but was postponed to 24 June 2022.

=== Theatrical and box office ===
| Release date | Country | Theatrical engagements | Total box office |
|---|---|---|---|
| 2022-06-24 | Mainland China | 529,022 | $253,770,000 |
| 2022-08-04 | Australia | 44 | $42,191 |
| 2022-08-04 | New Zealand | 12 | $6,877 |
| 2022-08-05 | Canada | Limited | |
| 2022-08-05 | United States | Limited | |

=== Streaming and viewership ===
| Release date | Streaming service | Available area | Viewership |
|---|---|---|---|
| 2022-08-26 | IQIYI, Tencent Video, Youku, Mango TV, Xigua Video | Mainland China | |
| 2022-09-24 | Netflix | Hong Kong, India, Japan, Malaysia, Philippines, Singapore, South Korea, Taiwan, Thailand, Vietnam | WEEKS IN TOP 10: 3 weeks in Hong Kong, 1 week in Malaysia, 1 week in Singapore, 6 weeks in Taiwan, 1 week in Thailand, 3 weeks in Vietnam. |

== Reception ==
Douban, a major Chinese media rating site, gave the drama 7.3 out of 10.

== Accolades ==
| Award | Date of ceremony | Category | Recipient(s) | Result | Ref. |
|---|---|---|---|---|---|
| Golden Rooster Awards | November 13, 2022 | Best Picture | Lighting Up the Stars | Nominated | |
| Golden Rooster Awards | November 13, 2022 | Best Directorial Debut | Liu Jiangjiang | Won | |
| Golden Rooster Awards | November 13, 2022 | Best Actor | Zhu Yilong | Won | |
| Golden Rooster Awards | November 13, 2022 | Best Actress | Yang Enyou | Nominated | |
| Golden Rooster Awards | November 13, 2022 | Best Cinematography | Zhao Yuqing | Nominated | |
| Golden Rooster Awards | November 13, 2022 | Best Sound Recording | Wang Gang/ Liu Xiaosha | Nominated | |
| Golden Rooster Awards | November 13, 2022 | Best Editing | Zhu Lin/ Wei Yong/ Gaoqiong Jiali | Nominated | |
| Asian Film Awards | March 12, 2023 | Best Newcomer | Yang Enyou | Nominated | |
| Asian Film Awards | March 12, 2023 | Best Screenplay | Liu Jiangjiang, Yu Min | Nominated | |
| Asian Film Awards | March 12, 2023 | Best Editing | Zhu Lin, Wei Yong, Gao Qiongjiali | Nominated | |
