= Bai Yu (actor) =

Chinese actor

- Born: April 8, 1990 (age 36); Xi'an, Shaanxi, China
- Other names: Bai Yu Ge Ge, Xiao Yu, Xiao Bai
- Education: Central Academy of Drama
- Occupation: Actor
- Years active: 2014–present
- Agent: Easy Entertainment

Chinese name
- Simplified Chinese: 白宇
Transcriptions
Standard Mandarin
- Hanyu Pinyin: Bái Yǔ

Bai Yu (Chinese: 白宇, born 8 April 1990) is a Chinese actor. He is best known for his roles in the dramas Love O2O (2016), Memory Lost (2016), Suddenly This Summer (2018), Guardian (2018), Detective L (2019), The Long Night (2020), The Bond (2021), and The Wind Blows from Longxi (2022).

== Early life and education ==
Bai was born in Xi'an, Shaanxi, China on April 8, 1990. He graduated from the Central Academy of Drama with a bachelor's degree in performance.

== Biography ==
In 2014, Bai made his acting debut in the web drama 0.5 Diors.

In 2015, Bai starred in the youth medical drama Grow Up, portraying a rebellious yet realistic intern. The same year, he was cast in the modern romance dramas Above the Clouds and Hello, Joann.

In 2016, Bai gained recognition with his role in the war drama Young Marshal directed by Zhang Li. He gained further recognition with his supporting role in the hit romantic comedy drama Love O2O. He then played the leading role in the crime mystery web drama Memory Lost, adapted from Ding Mo's novel of the same name. The series was a hit in China and led to increased popularity for Bai.

In 2017, Bai starred in the patriotic film The Founding of an Army, portraying Cai Qingchuan. He received positive reviews for his performance.

In 2018, Bai starred in the acclaimed youth melodrama Suddenly This Summer. The series was nominated for the 32nd China TV Drama Flying Apsaras Awards for Outstanding Television Series. He then starred in the science fiction mystery web drama Guardian. The series developed a cult following online and led to increased popularity for Bai. Forbes China listed Bai under their 30 Under 30 Asia 2017 list which consisted of 30 influential people under 30 years old who have had a substantial effect in their fields.

In 2019, Bai appeared in CCTV's spring gala for the first time, performing the song item "Child of Generation". He starred in the republican detective drama Detective L. He also featured in the family drama film Looking Up, winning Breakthrough Film Actor at the Tencent Vido All Star Awards and Film Actor of the Year at the Tencent Entertainment White Paper. He ranked 36th on Forbes China Celebrity 100 list.

In 2020, Bai starred in the fantasy romance drama Fairyland Lovers. He ranked 68th on Forbes China Celebrity 100 list. In October of the same year, Bai impressed with his emotional performance in the highly acclaimed crime drama The Long Night.

In September 2021, Bai played the leading role in the Daylight Entertainment family drama The Bond. The series received mainly positive reviews and was selected by National Radio and Television Administration as one of the dramas of the year.

In April 2022, Bai starred in the historical drama The Wind Blows from Longxi adapted from Ma Boyong's novel of the same name. The series was praised by critics and Douban gave it 8.1 out of 10.

== Filmography ==
=== Film ===
Year	English title	Chinese title	Role	Notes	Ref.
2016	Love O2O	微微一笑很倾城	Cao Guang / Zhenshui Wuxiang		
2016	When Larry Met Mary	陆垚知马俐			Cameo
2016	The Fraud Love Group	骗爱天团	Yang Xiuxian		Cameo
2017	The Founding of an Army	建军大业	Cai Qingchuan		Cameo
2018	Legend of Demon Catcher Fahai	缉妖法海传	Pei Wende		
2019	Looking Up	银河补习班	Ma Fei		
2023	Post-truth	洗白白	Feng Qiangqiang		Cameo

=== Television series ===
Year	English title	Chinese title	Role	Network	Notes/Ref.
2014	0.5 Diors	屌丝日记	You Dongdong	LeTV	
2015	Grow Up	长大	Xie Nanxiang	Dragon TV	
2016	Young Marshal	少帅	Feng Yong	Beijing TV, Dragon TV	
2016	Love O2O	微微一笑很倾城	Cao Guang	Dragon TV, Jiangsu TV	
2016	Hello, Joann	你好乔安	Chen Xiao	Zhejiang TV	
2016	Memory Lost	美人为馅	Han Chen	iQiyi	
2017	Above the Clouds	云巅之上	Mu Ge	iQiyi	
2018	Suddenly This Summer	忽而今夏	Zhang Yuan	Tencent	
2018	Guardian	镇魂	Zhao Yunlan	Youku	
2019	Detective L	绅探	Luo Fei	Tencent	
2020	Fairyland Lovers	蓬莱间	Bai Qi	Tencent	
2020	The Long Night	沉默的真相	Jiang Yang	iQiyi	
2021	Vacation of Love	假日暖洋洋	Hou Hao	Beijing TV, iQiyi	
2021	Minning Town	闽宁镇	Ding Shijun	Tencent, iQiyi, Youku, Zhejiang TV, Dragon TV, etc	Guest appearance
2021	The Bond	乔家的儿女	Qiao Yicheng	Zhejiang TV, Jiangsu TV, Tencent	
2022	The Wind Blows From Longxi	风起陇西	Xun Xu	CCTV-8, iQiyi	
2022	Thank You, Doctor	谢谢你医生	Bai Zhu	Tencent, iQiyi, CCTV-8	
2023	Take Us Home	龙城	Zheng Xijue	iQiyi	
2023	West Out of the Yumen	西出玉门	Chang Dong	Tencent	
2024	Bank on Me	前途无量	Lin Qiang	Youku, iQIYI, CCTV-8	
2026	Swords Into Plowshares	太平年	Qian Hongchu	CCTV-1, iQIYI, MGTV, Tencent	
TBA	The Fated General	霍去病	Bo Li		

=== Short film ===
Year	English title	Chinese title	Role	Notes/Ref.
2011	The Best Team	最佳团伙	Lin Dayu	
2013	Waiting for Blooming	等待绽放	Shu Zhan	
2018	20 Unanswered Calls	20个未接来电		
2018	Echoes of the Palace Museum	故宫回声	Lu Yuan	
2019	Let's Meet New	让我们重新认识		

=== Television show ===
Year	English title	Chinese title	Role	Notes
2019	Youth Periplous	青春环游记	Cast member	
2022	The Truth	开始推理吧	Cast member	
2024	The Truth Season 2	开始推理吧 第二季	Cast member	
2025	The Truth Season 3	开始推理吧 第三季	Cast member	

== Discography ==
Year	English title	Chinese title	Album	Notes
2016	"A Smile is Beautiful"	一笑倾城	Love O2O OST	with Vin Zhang, Zhang He, Cui Hang & Zheng Yecheng
2016	"Deep Sleep"	沉眠	Memory Lost OST	with Yang Rong
2018	"10.30 at Los Angeles"	洛杉矶的十点半	Suddenly Summer OST	
2018	"Flight of Time"	时间飞行	Guardian OST	with Zhu Yilong
2018	"Earth Star Meets Sea Star"	地星撞海星		with Zhu Yilong
2018	"Wake Me Up"			Advertisement theme song for Nivea Men
2019	"Child of Generation"	时代号子		Performance for CCTV Spring Gala
2019	"Ear Whispers of the Northern Arctic"	北极耳语		
2019	"The Glory of Youth"	少年的荣光	Sheng Zai Zhong Guo	
2020	"Come to an End"	告一段落		

== Awards and nominations ==
Year	Award	Category	Nominated work	Result	Ref.
2016	5th iQiyi All-Star Carnival	Best Couple	Memory Lost	Won	
2018	12th Tencent Video Star Awards	Quality TV Actor of the Year	Suddenly This Summer	Won	
2018	GQ 2018 Men of the Year	Promising Artist Award	N/A	Won	
2018	Q China Music Awards	Most Popular Crossover Singer	N/A	Won	
2018	Q China Music Awards	Most Popular Soundtrack	"Flight of Time"	Won	
2019	Golden Blossom - The 4th Network Film And Television Festival	Best Actor	Detective L	Nominated	
2019	Tencent Video All Star Awards	Breakthrough Film Actor	Looking Up	Won	
2019	Tencent Entertainment White Paper	Star Celebrity Board: Film Actor of the Year	Looking Up	Won	
2020	7th The Actors of China Award	Outstanding Actor	Fairyland Lovers	Won	
2020	7th The Actors of China Award	Best Performance by an Actor-Internet Drama	Fairyland Lovers	Nominated	
2020	iQIYI Scream Night	Acclaimed Actor of the Year	The Long Night	Won	
2020	Tencent Entertainment White Paper	Quality Actor of the Year	The Long Night	Won	
2020	3rd Sir Movie Cultural And Entertainment Industry Awards	Best Leading Actor in a Television Series	The Long Night	Nominated	
2020	3rd Sir Movie Cultural And Entertainment Industry Awards	Best Casting in a Television Series	The Long Night	Nominated	
2020	2020 IFeng Film and TV Award	Best Actor in a Television Series	The Long Night	Won	
2021	2020 Weibo Night	Breakthrough Actor of the Year	The Long Night	Won	
2021	9th iQiyi All-Star Carnival	Outstanding Actor of the Year	The Long Night	Won	
2021	2021 BIFF Asia Contents Awards	Best Actor	The Long Night	Nominated	
2021	GQ 2021 Men of the Year	Promising Actor of the Year	N/A	Won	
2021	32nd Huading Awards	Best Actor (Contemporary Drama)	The Long Night	Nominated	
2021	32nd Huading Awards	Audience's Favorite TV Actor	The Bond	Nominated	
2021	2021 IFeng Film and TV Award	Best Actor in a Television Series	The Bond	Nominated	
2021	2021 New Weekly Awards	Artist of the Year	N/A	Won	
2021	2021 China TV Drama Awards	Outstanding Actor of the Year	The Bond	Won	
2022	Golden Blossom - The 6th Network Film And Television Festival	Quality Actor of the Year	N/A	Won	
2022	35th Huading Awards	Best Actor	The Wind Blows from Longxi	Nominated	
2023	CMG 1st Chinese TV Drama Annual Ceremony	Breakthrough Actor of the Year	The Wind Blows from Longxi	Won	
	Tencent Video All Star Night 2023	Quality TV Drama Actor of the Year		Won	
