= Hello, Joann =

2016 Chinese television series

- Directed by
- Starring: Stephy Qi
- Country of origin: China
- Original language: Mandarin

Production
- Production location: China

Original release
- Network: Zhejiang Television
- Release: 31 July – 14 August 2016

Hello, Joann
- Simplified Chinese: 你好乔安
Transcriptions
Standard Mandarin
- Hanyu Pinyin: Ni Hao Qiao An

Hello, Joann is a 2016 Chinese television series. Filming for this series began in Shanghai on August 7, 2015, and wrapped in Thailand on November 13.

== Synopsis ==
Qiao An, a young woman who once lived a life fit for a princess, was forced to flee to a distant land following a sudden, devastating upheaval. Everyone assumed her life had reached its end; however, to their surprise, Qiao An made a glamorous reappearance in Shanghai—determined to reclaim Oris, the advertising empire her father had lost. Lu Yuanyang, the President of Oris Shanghai, was formerly Qiao An's father's assistant; fully aware of her past history, he frequently subjected her to difficult challenges. Thus began a cat-and-mouse game in the corporate arena between a seasoned veteran—an elite executive honed by years of struggle—and a newcomer bent on absolute victory. Refusing to give up, Qiao An eventually earned Lu Yuanyang's respect; a unique romantic spark ignited between them, though their relationship remained fraught with constant friction. Meanwhile, Qiao An's only friend, Ni Hao—who had recently suffered the double blow of a breakup and job loss—found solace and support in her bond with Qiao An. She also crossed paths with Jiang Qifei, a wealthy playboy; as they navigated a series of shared experiences that fostered their mutual growth, Ni Hao found herself waiting in vain for Jiang Qifei to finally confess his feelings. At this juncture, Qiao An's wealthy ex-boyfriend returned to the picture, while Lu Yuanyang also found himself reunited in the workplace with his own first love. As Oris faced the threat of a corporate takeover, Qiao An and Lu Yuanyang ultimately joined forces to save the company; however, once Qiao An's true background was exposed, she vanished once again. With Oris back on track under his leadership, Lu Yuanyang now waits for Qiao An's return.

== Cast ==
- Stephy Qi as Qiao An
- Wang Xiaochen as Ni Hao
- David Chen as Lu Yuanyang
- Wang Gongliang as Jiang Qifei
- Bai Yu as Chen Xiao
- Chang Chen-kuang as Fei Tiannan
- Sammy Sum as Steven, Lu Yuanyang's Arch-Rival
- Yao Anlian as Mr. Gong
- Kent Tong as General Manager Chen, Chen Xiao's father
- Zhao Yihuan as Xiao Bai, Jiang Qifei's ex-girlfriend

== Reception ==
=== Ratings ===
China Dragon TV / Jiangsu TV premiere ratings (CSM50)
| Episodes | Broadcast date | Dragon TV | | | | | |
| Episodes | Broadcast date | Ratings (%) | Audience share (%) | Rankings | Ratings (%) | Audience share (%) | Rankings |

== Awards and nominations ==
| Year | Award | Category | Recipient | Result | Ref. |

== International broadcast ==
| Channel | Location | Broadcast start date | Note |
|---|---|---|---|
| Zhejiang Television | People's Republic of China (the Mainland.) | 31 July 2016 | |
