= The Story of Minglan =

2018 Chinese historical television series

- DVD cover
- Also known as: Legend of the Concubine's Daughter: Minglan
- Genre: Historical fiction; Political; Family
- Based on: Do you know? Do You Know? If the green is still plump and the red still lean? by Guanxin Zeluan
- Written by: Zeng Lu; Wu Tong
- Directed by: Zhang Kaizhou
- Starring: Zhao Liying; Feng Shaofeng; Zhu Yilong
- Country of origin: China
- Original language: Mandarin
- No. of episodes: 73

Production
- Executive producer: Hou Hongliang
- Production locations: Hengdian World Studios; Jiaxing; Wuxi; Jiangsu
- Production company: Daylight Entertainment

Original release
- Network: Hunan TV
- Release: December 25, 2018

The Story of Minglan
- Simplified Chinese: 知否?知否?应是绿肥红瘦
- Traditional Chinese: 知否?知否?應是綠肥紅瘦
Transcriptions
Standard Mandarin
- Hanyu Pinyin: Zhīfǒu? Zhīfǒu? yìng shì lǜféi hóngshòu

The Story of Minglan (simplified Chinese: 知否?知否?应是绿肥红瘦; traditional Chinese: 知否?知否?應是綠肥紅瘦; pinyin: Zhī fǒu? Zhī fǒu? Yīng shì lǜ féi hóng shòu) is a 2018 Chinese television series adapted from the novel of the same name written under the pseudonym Guanxin Zeluan. The series stars Zhao Liying, Feng Shaofeng, and Zhu Yilong, and premiered on Hunan Television on December 25, 2018.

== Background ==
Set during the Northern Song dynasty, the story follows Sheng Minglan, the daughter of a civil official and his concubine. Neglected by her father and stepmother, and often mistreated by her half-sisters, Minglan learns to conceal her talents and intentions. She meets Gu Tingye in childhood, although she initially develops feelings for Qi Heng, the son of the Duke of Qi. Over time, Gu Tingye rises to prominence as a military official and eventually marries Minglan. After their marriage, Minglan assists him in managing family conflicts, countering corrupt officials at court, and avenging her biological mother's death. As the wife of a marquis, she gains authority within the Sheng household and becomes an influential figure in the family's rise.

== Plot ==
The story follows the life of Sheng Minglan from early childhood to early middle age.

Sheng Hong, a fifth-rank official and head of the Sheng household, has one official wife, two concubines, and six children. His official wife, Wang Ruofu, is temperamental but good-hearted, and she is often in conflict with Sheng Hong's favored concubine, Lin Qinshuang. Lin, a former servant, feigns weakness and sympathy to gain Sheng Hong's affection, which causes tension with Wang Ruofu. Sheng Hong's stepmother, Old Madam Sheng, the only daughter of the Marquis of Yongyi, is highly respected among the nobility. However, her relationship with Sheng Hong is strained due to his inability to restrain Lin Qinshuang and protect Wang Ruofu's position, as well as the fact that she is not his biological mother despite raising him.

Sheng Minglan, the sixth child of Sheng Hong, was born to his concubine Wei Shuyi. After witnessing her pregnant mother's death—an indirect result of Minglan's attempt to defend her—she learns to conceal her intelligence and suppress her spirited nature. Minglan is subsequently raised by Old Madam Sheng, who dotes on her. Minglan's siblings include Hualan, Changbai, and Rulan: the legitimate children of Wang Ruofu, and Changfeng and Molan: the children of Lin Qinshuang. Their personalities largely reflect those of their mothers: Hualan is honest and unscheming; Changbai is straightforward and scholarly, later befriending Gu Tingye; Changfeng is carefree but ambitious; Rulan is temperamental yet straightforward; and Molan is calculating, seeking to improve her status through marriage. The Sheng children grow up alongside Qi Heng, Gu Tingye, and Yu Yanran.

Molan, resentful of her position as a concubine's daughter, schemes to marry into wealth. With Lin Qinshuang's assistance, she becomes involved with Liang Han, son of the Count of Yongchang. Although Lady Wu, Liang Han's mother, favors Minglan as a daughter-in-law, Molan resorts to underhanded tactics to secure the marriage. The scandal brings shame to the Sheng family, and Lin Qinshuang is punished and sent to the family's farmstead, where she admits to lacking true affection for Sheng Hong. Minglan reveals to her that Molan's marriage was part of a plan to avenge her mother's death. Molan later suffers in her marriage, as Liang Han keeps many concubines, particularly favoring his maid Chun Ke.

Rulan, by contrast, values personal happiness over social standing. Despite Wang Ruofu's wish for her to marry into nobility, she falls in love with her father's student, who had previously been engaged to Molan. Rulan eventually marries him, and the couple enjoys a stable and affectionate relationship.

Meanwhile, Qi Heng, the son of the Duke of Qi and the Princess of Pingning, develops feelings for Minglan. Though she reciprocates, Qi Heng idealizes her and fails to understand her true emotions. Ultimately, he is compelled to marry the Princess of Jiacheng. Their marriage ends tragically during a rebellion, resulting in the execution of his wife's family. Qi Heng goes on to remarry and find peace and fulfillment in his new relationship once he gets over Minglan and reconciles with Gu Tingye

Gu Tingye, the son of the Marquis of Ningyuan, rises in prominence after saving the emperor during the rebellion. Despite his achievements, he has a troubled past: his stepmother, Lady Qin, despises him while feigning kindness, and his father resents him due to the circumstances of his birth. His mother, Lady Bai, was forced into marriage for her wealth and died in grief while pregnant. Tingye develops a poor reputation for reckless behavior and fathers two children with his mistress, Zhu Manniang, who later abandons him but attempts to return when his fortunes improve. Upon discovering her betrayal, Tingye expels her. He also faces Lady Qin's schemes, as she attempts to position her son, Tingwei, as heir to the marquisate.

Eventually, Gu Tingye proposes to Minglan. Though hesitant at first, she accepts after realizing he has reformed and is sincere in his devotion. As the lady of the Gu household, Minglan must navigate conflicts with Lady Qin, extended relatives, Wang Ruoyu (Wang Ruofu's elder sister and matriarch of the Kang household), Zhu Manniang, and members of the imperial family. Throughout her marriage, she strengthens her ties with her siblings, reconciles with her father and stepmother, and supports other noble families. Together, she and Gu Tingye face personal and political challenges, gradually developing a relationship built on mutual reliance and understanding.

== Differences from the novel ==
(Incomplete)

In the original novel, the protagonist is a 21st-century woman whose consciousness enters the body of a fever-stricken five-year-old Minglan. Despite her background, she rarely uses knowledge from the modern era and instead strives to remain inconspicuous, so the course of events remains largely unchanged.

Rulan is portrayed as haughty and arrogant. Although she eventually develops a reasonably amicable relationship with Minglan, this is mostly due to Minglan's accommodating nature, rather than genuine affection.

Sheng Hong, Minglan's father, is indecisive in mediating disputes between his wife and favored concubine, but he is portrayed as fair and reasonable toward his children. Minglan's early life is depicted as relatively peaceful, with little bullying.

Unlike in the television adaptation, there is no love triangle involving Qi Heng. He wishes to marry Minglan but confides only in his parents. His mother does not dislike Minglan, though she does not consider her suitable as a legal wife. His parents suggest that Qi Heng take Minglan as a concubine, which he refuses. At their urging, he marries a princess instead. Neither Minglan nor the public are aware of his intentions, and the matter is not revisited once Minglan becomes engaged to and later marries Gu Tingye.

Gu Tingye's marital history also differs. He initially seeks to marry Minglan's friend, but circumstances lead him to wed her half-sister, a concubine's daughter. At the time, he is already in a relationship with Zhu Manniang, with whom he has children. Minglan warns him of Manniang's ambitions and predicts her eventual betrayal, which later proves accurate. After his wife's death, Gu Tingye investigates and expels Manniang, sending her and her children away permanently.

Opposition to Minglan in the novel is generally less confrontational than in the television series. Most adversaries attempt to exploit her position for personal gain, and she thwarts them while maintaining etiquette and decorum. Few directly attack her reputation, and violent schemes such as murder are absent.

== Cast ==
=== Main ===
| Actor | Character | Introduction |
|---|---|---|
| Zhao Liying | Sheng Minglan | The sixth child and fourth daughter of Sheng Hong, born to his concubine Wei Shuyi. Intelligent and observant, she grows up overlooked within the family and learns to conceal her abilities. Cautious about trusting others due to her upbringing, she later marries Gu Tingye and builds a relationship based on mutual respect. Calm and pragmatic, she is protective of those close to her. |
| Feng Shaofeng | Gu Tingye | The second son of the Marquis of Ningyuan, by his wife Lady Bai. Skilled in military affairs, he has a reputation for brash behavior and strained family relations. Loyal to those he values, he gradually improves his public standing and becomes a trusted official, with Minglan's support. |

=== Supporting ===
==== Sheng household (Minglan's childhood home) ====
===== Kaifeng =====
| Actor | Character | Introduction |
|---|---|---|
| | Old Master Sheng | (Deceased, never shown) Husband of Old Madam Sheng and father of Sheng Hong. He placed third in the Hanlin Academy examination. |
| Cao Cuifen | Old Madam Sheng | Matriarch of the Sheng family and the only daughter of the Marquis of Yongyi. Legal mother of Sheng Hong and mother-in-law of Wang Ruofu. She adopted Sheng Hong, the son of her husband's concubine Lady Chun, after the death of her biological son, and raised him as her own. She develops a close bond with Minglan, whom she raises after Wei Shuyi's death. She is critical of Sheng Hong's inability to restrain Lin Qinshuang or uphold the status of his official wife. Skilled at subtle manipulation, Old Madam Sheng is capable of navigating household politics but generally prefers to live quietly. |
| Liu Jun | Sheng Hong | Current head of the Sheng family and father of Hualan, Changbai, Changfeng, Molan, Rulan, and Minglan. He favors his concubine Lin Qinshuang, causing tension with his adoptive mother and official wife. Although tactful, he avoids confrontation and is often indecisive in conflicts between his wives. While affectionate toward his children, he is prone to favoritism and manipulation. Maintaining the Sheng family's reputation is his top priority, sometimes at the expense of his children. |
| Liu Lin | Wang Ruofu | Sheng Hong's official wife and mother of Hualan, Changbai, and Rulan. Her temper often overshadows her reasonable and kind nature, leading to misunderstandings with her husband. She resents Lin Qinshuang, whom Sheng Hong took as a concubine during her early years of marriage. Devoted to her children, she struggles with manipulation by others, including her sister Madame Kang. After being tricked into actions that harm the family, she is sent to live with relatives for reflection. Eventually, she accepts her mistakes and grows more self-aware. |
| Gao Lu | Lin Qinshuang | Sheng Hong's favored concubine and mother of Changfeng and Molan. Once a servant of Old Madam Sheng, she gains influence through manipulation and secures her position in the household. She embezzles resources from Wei Shuyi and contributes to her death. Known for scheming and feigning weakness, her primary ambition is to see her daughter Molan marry into nobility. Eventually, her deceit is exposed, and she is punished and exiled to a rural estate, where she dies shortly afterward. |
| Liu Xiyuan | Wei Shuyi | Sheng Hong's concubine and Minglan's biological mother. From a poor background, she enters the Sheng household without wealth or strong family connections. Gentle and reserved, she avoids conflict and teaches Minglan to remain inconspicuous. She dies during childbirth, manipulated by Lin Qinshuang's interference. |
| Wang Herun | Sheng Hualan | Sheng Hong's eldest child and daughter, by Wang Ruofu. Mother of Zhuang and Shi. Gentle and caring toward her siblings, she supports her mother during family conflicts. Married into a higher-status family, she struggles with mistreatment from her mother-in-law, who at times separates her from her children. |
| Wang Renjun | Sheng Changbai | Sheng Hong's eldest son, by Wang Ruofu. A learned and upright scholar, he values justice over family reputation and is known for fairness. Trusted by his siblings, especially Minglan, he is also a close friend of Gu Tingye. |
| Ren Wanjing | Hai Zhaoyun | Wife of Sheng Changbai and mother of Sheng Quan. Intelligent and sensible, she maintains good relations with Minglan and Rulan but dislikes Molan. |
| | Sheng Quan | Son of Sheng Changbai and Hai Zhaoyun. |
| Zhang Xiaoqian | Sheng Changfeng | Sheng Hong's youngest son, by Lin Qinshuang. Reckless and impressionable, he causes trouble for the family in his youth. Though frivolous, he remains loyal to his mother. Later, fatherhood and distance from household politics lead him to mature. |
| | Lady Liu | Wife of Sheng Changfeng. |
| Shi Shi | Sheng Molan | Sheng Hong's second daughter, by Lin Qinshuang, and wife of Liang Han. Ambitious and insecure about her status as a concubine's child, she is competitive and scheming. Pressured by her mother, she seeks to improve her social position through marriage, ultimately marrying Liang Han. However, her manipulative behavior strains her marriage and leads to difficulties in her new household. |
| Zhang Jianing | Sheng Rulan | Sheng Hong's third daughter, by Wang Ruofu, and wife of Wen Yanjing. Spoiled but straightforward, she values personal happiness over ambition. Close to Minglan but often at odds with Molan, she marries Wen Yanjing, a scholar of lower status who loves her sincerely. |
| Zhang Lu | Wen Yanjing | Sheng Rulan's husband and a scholar of modest background. Devoted to Rulan despite his lower status and domineering mother. |
| Shi Yan | Mother Fang | Old Madam Sheng's personal maid. |
| | Suqin | Maid of Old Madam Sheng. |
| | Dongrong | Servant of Sheng Hong. |
| Hong Hua | Mother Liu Jia | Wang Ruofu's personal maid and mother of Yinxing. |
| Wang Yi | Caihuan | Maid of Wang Ruofu. |
| Ma Ding | Zhou Xueniang | Lin Qinshuang's maidservant. Loyal to her mistress, she assists in household schemes until Lin Qinshuang's downfall, after which she is sold. |
| Lu Yanqi | Liu Xiaodie | Wei Shuyi's servant. Wrongly accused of theft by Lin Qinshuang, she is dismissed but receives a token of farewell from her mistress. |
| Yuan Yuan | Zhulou | Lin Qinshuang's servant, later transferred to Wei Shuyi. |
| Zhang Shuwei | Lümeng | Lin Qinshuang's servant, later transferred to Wei Shuyi. |
| | Hanniu | Sheng Changbai's servant. |
| | Yanghao | Sheng Changbai's servant. |
| | Langhao | Sheng Changbai's servant. |
| | Yunzai | Sheng Molan's servant. |
| | Luzhong | Sheng Molan's servant. |
| Tian Luo | Mother Cui Ru'an | Servant of Old Madam Sheng, later assigned to Minglan. |
| Wang Ziwei | Xiaotao | Minglan's personal maid and confidante. She grows up alongside Minglan and later marries Shitou, Gu Tingye's servant. |
| Han Ye | Danju | Maid of Minglan. Later married to an ordinary man. |
| Li Yuanyuan | Cuiwei | Servant of Old Madam Sheng, later assigned to Minglan. Becomes one of Minglan's most trusted companions. |
| Cao Ying | Jiu'er | Wang Ruofu's servant, later reassigned to Minglan. Trusted as one of her chief maids. |
| | Yinxing | Daughter of Mother Liu and maid of Wang Ruofu, later serving Minglan. |
| | Ke'er | Sheng Changfeng's servant, later serving Minglan. |
| | Mei'er | Sheng Changfeng's servant, later serving Minglan. |
| Yang Xiaodan | Lady Guan | Head of the kitchen in the Sheng household. |
| Liu Qing | Lady Wei | Younger sister of Wei Shuyi. She convinces Old Madam Sheng and Wang Ruofu to care for the orphaned Minglan and remains suspicious of the Sheng family's role in her sister's death. |
| Ning Xiaozhi | Zhuang Xuejiu | |
| Yu Nannan | Momo Kong | Etiquette tutor brought in to instruct the Sheng daughters in courtly manners. |

===== Youyang =====
| Actor | Character | Introduction |
|---|---|---|
| | Sheng Huaizhong | Old Master Sheng's elder brother. The father of Sheng Wei and Sheng Shu. |
| Zhu Huaixu | Elder Old Madam | Sheng Huaizhong's wife and the mother of Sheng Wei and Sheng Shu. |
| Wang Gang | Sheng Wei | Sheng Huaizhong's eldest son. The father of Changsong, Shulan, Changwu and Pinlan. He is the head of the eldest branch of the Sheng family. |
| Qian Youyou | Lady Li | Sheng Wei's wife and the mother of Changsong, Shulan, Changwu and Pinlan. |
| | Sheng Changsong | Sheng Wei's eldest son, by his wife Lady Li. |
| Zhang Hanyun | Sheng Shulan | Sheng Wei's elder daughter, by his wife Lady Li. Former wife of Sun Zhigao. |
| Hu Shuoyu | Sheng Changwu | Sheng Wei's second son, by his wife Lady Li. |
| Xu Yue | Sheng Pinlan | Sheng Wei's younger daughter, by his wife Lady Li. |
| | Sheng Shu | Sheng Huaizhong's daughter. |
| Xia Minghao | Sun Zhigao | Sheng Shulan's former husband. |
| Xue Yuanyuan | Mrs. Sun | Sun Zhigao's mother. |

==== Gu household ====
===== Cheng Garden (Gu Tingye and Sheng Minglan's marital home) =====
| Actor | Character | Introduction |
|---|---|---|
| Li Yixiao | Zhu Manniang | Gu Tingye's unofficial mistress during his early youth and mother of Shurong and Shuchang. She defies her lowly birth and occupation as a street performer to live with Gu Tingye. Ambitious and manipulative, she aims to become the official lady of the Gu family. After a series of schemes and attempts to control Gu Tingye, she is ultimately placed under house arrest and later killed in self-defense while trying to harm Gu Tingye's infant son. |
| Zhao Qi | Qian Fengxian | Gu Tingye's unwanted concubine, arranged by his aunt, who is actually a spy sent by Lady Qin. She attempts to poison Sheng Minglan and Gu Shutuan but is captured by Shi Tou. |
| Ye Xuantong | Gu Shurong | Gu Tingye's first child and only daughter, by Zhu Manniang. Bright and intelligent, she is favored by her father and comes to view Minglan as her mother due to Minglan's care and affection. |
| Deng Hanyu | Gu Shuchang | Gu Tingye's second child and eldest son, by Zhu Manniang. He is taken by his mother as a toddler and dies from illness before reuniting with his father. |
| | Gu Shutuan | Gu Tingye's third child and second son, by Sheng Minglan. Born during a fire, several attempts are made on his life as a baby. |
| Kang Qunzhi | Granny Chang | Gu Tingye's wet nurse and former servant of his mother. She protects Gu Tingye and treats Sheng Minglan with respect, while seeing through Zhu Manniang's schemes. |
| Shen Chi | Shi Tou | Gu Tingye's servant and closest confidant. Loyal and stalwart, he also advises his master and has affection for Xiaotao, Minglan's maid. |
| Yang Yang | Lady Che | Shitou's third sister-in-law. |
| | Supervisor Tu | Gu Tingye's subordinate and leader of his personal guard, later tasked with protecting Sheng Minglan. |
| Tian Junlian | Mother Diao | Servant of the younger Lady Qin, later sent to serve Sheng Minglan. |
| Cong Zhongxiao | Mother Lai | Mother of Mingyue and servant of the younger Lady Qin, later sent to serve Sheng Minglan. |
| Liu Mengke | Mingyue | Elder daughter of Mother Lai and servant of the younger Lady Qin, later sent to serve Sheng Minglan. |
| Jing Tian | Mother Tian | Fourth Aunt's servant, later sent to serve Sheng Minglan. |
| | Mother Hua | Fifth Aunt's servant, later sent to serve Sheng Minglan. |
| An Wei | | Wife of Wang Wu. |
| Zhang Jing | Xiaocui | Zhu Manniang's servant. |
| Zhou Yihua | Ba Laofu | Manager of Heishan Farmstead. |

===== Ningyuan Manor (Gu Tingye's childhood home) =====
| Actor | Character | Introduction |
|---|---|---|
| Li Hongtao | Gu Yankai | Marquis of Ningyuan and father of Gu Tingyu, Gu Tingye, and Gu Tingwei. He is strict, military-minded, and unyielding. Pressured by his family, he is forced to divorce his first wife to marry Lady Bai, which caused lasting resentment. He treats Gu Tingye with harshness and favors displays of propriety over personal relationships. |
| | The elder Lady Qin | Gu Yankai's first wife and childhood sweetheart, mother of Tingyu. Forced into divorce due to family pressure, she commits suicide. She was sickly her entire life, a trait she passed on to her son. |
| Wang Jingyun | Lady Bai | Gu Yankai's second wife and mother of Tingye. From a wealthy merchant family who adore her, she marries Gu Yankai under a misunderstanding. The Gu family was desperate for her massive dowry, but the Bai family's knowledge of the unmarried Gu men's terrible reputations lead them to say only the upright Gu Yankai was worth marrying. As such, to secure her, the Gu family ensured Gu Yankai was available for a match by forcing him to divorce his wife for Lady Bai. Lady Bai's marriage is unhappy, and she dies during childbirth after learning the truth of the situation and why her husband and the household hate her. |
| Wang Yinan | Lady Qin the Younger | Gu Yankai's third wife and mother of Tingwei. Younger sister of the elder Lady Qin. Gu Yankai married her because of her connection to his one true love, his first wife. She maintains a virtuous public image as a soft-spoken, perfect, Boddhisatva of a woman, but privately favors her son over her stepsons and works in his favor. She is Gu Tingye's primary antagonist. Brilliant and scheming, she played the doting, indulgent mother to Gu Tingye, which was a cover up for her more nefarious scheme of pushing him into a life of debauchery and excess which publicly ruined his reputation and caused his father to loathe him. Lady Qin has a deep and abiding hatred of the Gu clan for how they treated her elder sister and for forcing her to live a life pretending to be someone she isn't, which eventually leads her to commit suicide. |
| Gao Zifeng | Gu Tingyu | Eldest son of Gu Yankai and the elder Lady Qin, and father of Gu Shuxian. Brilliantly intelligent and sickly, he grew up hating Gu Tingye, which was encouraged by his late mother's staff and his aunt/stepmother. When it becomes clear that he will not live long, he strategically supports Gu Tingye in exchange for protection of his family, trying to safeguard his daughter and wife for after his death. |
| Yang Zhidi | Lady Shao | Gu Tingyu's devoted wife and mother of Gu Shuxian. |
| Kang Jiaye | Gu Shuxian (娴) | Gu Tingyu's only child and daughter. Smart and well-cared for by her father, she befriends her cousin Rong'er and learns household management from Minglan. |
| Liu Zhehui | Gu Tingwei | Gu Yankai's third son, by his 3rd wife the Younger Lady Qin. Amiable and genuine, he is in a unsuited to responsibility or leadership. However, his mother is determined to make him the heir of the Gu marquisate as repayment for the live she has endured. But Tingwei is fond of his big brother, Gu Tingye, and lacks skill and ambition. His mother kills herself while cursing him as worthless. |
| Xia Yiyao | Lady Zhu | Gu Tingwei's wife. |
| Xu Yulan | Third Aunt | Gu Yankai's third younger sister. |
| Yang Xinming | Fourth Uncle | Gu Yankai's fourth younger brother and Tingbing's father. Head of the fourth branch of the Gu family. |
| Cui Yi | Fourth Aunt | Wife of the fourth master and mother of Tingbing. |
| Ye Zicheng | Gu Tingbing | Second son of the fourth master. |
| Hu Yuanjun | | Gu Tingbing's wife. |
| Tan Xihe | Fifth Uncle | Gu Yankai's fifth younger brother and Tingdi's father. Head of the fifth branch of the Gu family. |
| Wang Lele | Fifth Aunt | Wife of the fifth master and mother of Tingdi. |
| Liu Mianzi | Gu Tingdi | Son of the fifth master. |
| Chen Xi | | Gu Tingdi's wife. |
| Zhao Qianzi | Mother Xiang Ji'an | Servant of the younger Lady Qin. |
| | Youqing | Servant of Gu Tingyu. |
| | Zhuique | Servant of Gu Tingye. |
| | Hongxiao | Servant of Gu Tingye. |

==== Bai household ====
| Actor | Character | Introduction |
|---|---|---|
| Tu Nan | Bai Tingyu | Cousin of Lady Bai and eldest son of the second branch of the Bai family. The Bai family is a recently ennobled, wealthy merchant family. Gu Tingye inherits a substantial portion of the family's wealth from his maternal grandfather and his mother's generous dowry. Since childhood, some Bai relatives have attempted to harm him to reclaim the family fortune. |

==== Qi household ====
A Ducal household which far outranks Minglan's, but due to the scholarly reputation of her family, their heir, Qi Heng, grows up attending school with the Sheng children.

| Actor | Character | Introduction |
|---|---|---|
| Liu Pizhong | Duke of Qi | Father of Qi Heng. More reasonable than his wife, he still follows her wishes in all things and dotes on his son. |
| Chen Jin | Princess Pingning | A descendant of the previous emperor, wife of the Duke of Qi, and mother of Qi Heng. Raised by the Empress Dowager, she is elegant and proud, often looking down on those beneath her. Overly protective of her one and only son, she is something of a bulldozer parent, and greatly disapproves of Sheng Minglan due to Minglan's lower rank and concubine-born status, without considering Minglan's personal merits or character. After her efforts to match her son with others end with disasters and tragedies, she softens her stance, but still costs her son his first love. |
| Zhu Yilong | Qi Heng | The only child of the Duke of Qi and Princess Pingning. Childhood friend of Gu Tingye and Minglan's early love interest. He is earnest, amiable, elegant, and considered one of the capital’s most desirable bachelors. He has romantic feelings for Minglan, whom he idealizes and doesn't fully understand, but struggles to balance his desire to make her his wife with his hesitance. The social realities of their situation mean that he would need to make sacrifices in order to marry Minglan properly. His love for his mother and his fussy perfectionism streak cause him to delay time and again, until the choice is taken from him. His enviable status and good looks cause him to be kidnapped and blackmailed into his first marriage, which ends disastrously. Before he can propose to Minglan as a widow, Gu Tingye marries her, causing a rift between the friends. Ultimately, he marries for the second time, but develops an obsession with Minglan, seeking out an affair. After he comes to his senses and moves on, he is able to reconcile with Gu Tingye and form a supportive and loving relationship with his new wife.. |
| Zhang Hengyu | Princess Jiacheng | Qi Heng's first wife. Her family forcibly secured her marriage to Qi Heng. He loathes her and the marriage is an unhappy one. She and her family are executed following a failed coup on the imperial family. |
| Chen Yalan | Shen Hezhen | Qi Heng's second wife. Kind and intelligent, she quietly supports her husband despite his past affections for Sheng Minglan. Over time, Qi Heng comes to appreciate and love her, and realizes the two are better matched. |
| Wang Zijie | Buwei | Qi Heng's servant. Though master/servant, Buwei is Qi Heng's closest friend, aid, and confident. He is accidentally caned to death by Princess Pingning in an effort to control her son, which deeply affects Qi Heng. |
| Shi Jingyi | | Lady Shen's servant. |

==== He household ====
| Actor | Character | Introduction |
|---|---|---|
| Mu Liyan | Lady Zhuang | Longtime friend of Old Madam Sheng. Lady Zhuang is knowledgeable in medical matters and often provides guidance regarding health and remedies. |
| Liu Yue | He Hongwen | Lady Zhuang's only grandson and one of Minglan's suitors. He is an accomplished doctor and intelligent man with a calm, gentle, and solicitous personality. He has quietly admired Minglan since childhood, and his demeanor makes him Old Madam Sheng's preferred choice among potential suitors. However, his overly accommodating nature leads him to make decisions that disadvantage himself or others, such as agreeing to take his cousin Cao Jinxiu as a concubine before his own marriage. Ultimately, his indecisiveness and complicated family obligations render him unappealing to Minglan, and their engagement is broken off. Saddened, He Hongwen embarks on a multi-year journey to gather medicinal herbs and deepen his medical knowledge. |
| | Cao Jinxiu | He Hongwen's maternal cousin. She has loved He Hongwen since childhood. The Cao family was previously branded as traitors and driven from the capital but was later pardoned. Jinxiu, formerly a general's concubine, creates complications for He Hongwen's engagement to Minglan. Desperate and infatuated, she requests to become He Hongwen's concubine after his marriage, putting Minglan in a difficult position and indirectly contributing to the engagement's end. |
| Yan Jingyao | Madam Cao | Jinxiu's mother. Arrogant and manipulative, she pressures He Hongwen to accept her daughter as a concubine to secure her own safety and status. Her actions play a significant role in disrupting He Hongwen's engagement to Minglan. |

==== Yuan household ====
Minglan's eldest Di sister, Hualan, marries into the more prestigious Yuan count household. The wedding is a major event at the start of the series which introduces Minglan and Tingye. Though considered a triumphant and honorable match, Hualan's poor treatment in the Yuan house often sends her running home for advice and consolation, and convinces her sister, Rulan, that marrying into a higher ranking house is not worth the prestige.

| Actor | Character | Introduction |
|---|---|---|
| Huang Youming | Yuan Wenchun | The eldest son of the Count of Zhongqin. Hualan's father in law. Referenced but never shown in the series. |
| Cao Yueyao | | Yuan Wenchun's wife, Hualan's mother in law. Considered a horrible and overbearing mother in law, Hualan suffers considerably at her hands. Yue inflicts many arbitrary and harsh demands on Hualan, reprimands her for not having a son soon enough, and will frequently remove Hualan's children from her care. Referenced but never shown in the series. |
| Wang Ziming | Yuan Wenshao | The second son of the Count of Zhongqin, husband of Minglan's oldest sister, Hualan, and father of Yuan Zhuang and Yuan Shi. He loves his wife but he often allows his mother to mistreat her. Referenced but never shown in the series. |
| | Yuan Zhuang | The first child and daughter of Yuan Wenshao and Sheng Hualan. She is injured while attempting to protect her younger brother, Yuan Shi. Referenced but never shown in the series. |
| | Yuan Shi | The second child and son of Yuan Wenshao and Sheng Hualan. Due to his grandmother's machinations, he is taken from Hualan and frequently neglected by his caregivers. He is once nearly harmed by hot coals. Referenced but never shown in the series. |

==== Yu household ====
The household of one of Minglan's closest female friends, Yu Yanran. Though having an excellent status, the messy household dynamics make the Yu household Gu Tingye's ideal target to find himself a good wife. Few would want to match their decent daughters to him due to his bad reputation, but Yu Yanran's father's bias means he simply wants to be rid of her, while her grandparent's influence means she is an excellent lady. This conflict becomes one of the first times Minglan and Gu Tingye seriously face each other with their full wits.

| Actor | Character | Introduction |
|---|---|---|
| Ma Yanbin | The Grand Preceptor | Master Yu's father and Yu Yanran's grandfather. He helped raise her and is fond of his granddaughter. Initially reluctant to approve Gu Tingye's marriage proposal due to his poor reputation, he eventually comes to believe Gu Tingye is upright and allows the engagement. |
| Feng Jun | Old Master Yu | The Grand Preceptor's wife and Master Yu's mother. She is Yu Yanran's grandmother and reacts strongly to insults against her granddaughter. |
| | Master Yu | The Grand Preceptor's son and father of Yu Yanran and Yu Yanhong. Head of the eldest branch of the Yu family, he delegates the care of his eldest daughter to his parents after the death of his first wife. He shows little attachment to her and plans to sell her in marriage to Gu Tingye when the opportunity arises. He greatly favors his second wife and their children. |
| Liu Shuchen | Lady Fang | Master Yu's second wife and mother of Yu Yanhong. She and her husband favor their own children over Yu Yanran. |
| Deng Sha | Yu Yanran | Master Yu's first child and eldest daughter by his first wife. A childhood friend of Minglan, she is kind and amiable, but very timid and unfavored by her father. Gu Tingye initially courts her to secure a respectable main wife, believing her receding personality will ensure she accepts his already-existing children and mistress. She is afraid and intimidated by Gu Tingye and doesn't want to enter his messy and complicated household. Minglan mentally understands his reasoning, but emotionally despised Gu Tingye for targeting her friend's timidity in the hopes of exploiting it for his own benefit. His plans are disrupted by his mistress, Zhu Manniang. Minglan successfully helps Yu Yanran manage the situation without damaging her reputation, and the marriage proposal is canceled. |
| Liu Yanchen | | Master Yu's second child and only son, by his second wife Lady Fang. |
| Zhao Qin | Yu Yanhong | Master Yu's third child and younger daughter, by his second wife Lady Fang. She is proud, skilled in polo, and greatly favored . |

==== Liang household ====
| Actor | Character | Introduction |
|---|---|---|
| Wang Siyu | Lady Wu | Wife of the Count of Yongchang and mother of Liang Han. Lady Wu is bright, sincere, and bold. She favors Minglan and wishes her to marry her sixth son, Liang Han, as his main wife. Her motives include wanting a sensible and capable woman to manage her son's household affairs. Lady Wu attempts to negotiate this marriage even after Liang Han's affair with Sheng Molan, but the plan is ultimately prevented by Minglan's grandmother. |
| Wu Hong | Liang Han | Sixth and youngest son of the Count of Yongchang, by his wife Lady Wu. Initially drawn to the artistic Sheng Molan, Liang Han maintains a secret relationship with her. Although he agrees to marry Molan officially, the marriage becomes strained due to family complications and Molan's inexperience in managing a large household. Liang Han later begins to neglect her and takes new partners. |
| | Chun Ke | Liang Han's concubine, who dies due to complications in pregnancy. |
| | Qiujiang | Sheng Molan's servant. |
| | Furong | Sheng Molan's servant. |

==== Wang household ====
| Actor | Character | Introduction |
|---|---|---|
| | Wang You | Father of Shiping, Ruoyu, and Ruofu. He served as the Imperial Tutor and was buried in the Imperial Ancestral Temple. |
| Zhao Shuzhen | Old Madam Wang | Wife of Wang You and mother of Shiping, Ruoyu, and Ruofu. She strongly favors her eldest daughter, Wang Ruoyu, which negatively affects her younger daughter, Wang Ruofu. Old Madam Wang plays a role in the conflict between Ruoyu and Minglan, leading to official intervention. |
| Ma Yan | Wang Shiping | First child and only son of Wang You and Old Madam Wang. Husband of Madam Wang. |
| Liu Wanting | Madam Wang | Wife of Wang Shiping. |

==== Kang household ====
| Actor | Character | Introduction |
|---|---|---|
| Li Duo | Kang Haifeng | Father of Jin, Yun'er, and Zhao'er. He largely refrains from controlling his household and shows little involvement in family affairs. |
| Zhang Yanyan | Wang Ruoyu / Madam Kang | Official wife of Kang Haifeng and elder sister of Wang Ruofu (Minglan's legal mother). Legal mother of Jin and Yun'er. She is ambitious and manipulative, using her social status to influence others and advance her position within the family. Her actions include controlling household members and intervening in the affairs of her relatives for personal gain. Madam Kang ultimately attempts to harm Gu Tingye and Minglan's family but is killed in self-defense by Gu Tingye. |
| Lu Jin | Kang Jin | Son of Kang Haifeng and Wang Ruoyu. |
| Du Lingli | Kang Zhao'er | Concubine-born daughter of Kang Haifeng by Lady Su. Initially forced into a plan orchestrated by Madam Kang, she is later given a choice for her own safety and opts to marry a scholar, escaping her family's control. |
| Lin Dengdeng | Mother Qi | Servant of Wang Ruoyu. |

==== Imperial household ====
| Actor | Character | Introduction |
|---|---|---|
| Yang Qing | Empress Dowager | Mother of the Emperor. |
| Qin Yan | The Emperor | Ruler of the empire. |
| Yang Yuting | Noble Consort Rong | One of the Emperor's consorts. |
| Ning Wentong | Prince of Yong | Father of the Princess of Jiacheng. |
| Xie Chengying | Princess Consort of Yong | Wife of the Prince of Yong and mother of the Princess of Jiacheng. |
| Wang Yongquan | Prince of Yan | Imperial prince. |
| Feng Hui | Zhao Zongquan | Father of Zhao Ceying and Zhao Yong; later becomes the Emperor. |
| Juan Zi | Shen Congying | Wife of Zhao Zongquan and mother of Zhao Ceying; holds the title of Empress. |
| Fu Miao | Noble Consort Liu | Concubine of Zhao Zongquan and mother of Zhao Yong. |
| Huo Yaming | Zhao Ceying | Elder son of Zhao Zongquan and Shen Congying; Prince of Huan. |
| | Zhao Yong | Younger son of Zhao Zongquan and Noble Consort Liu. |

==== Shen household ====
| Actor | Character | Introduction |
|---|---|---|
| Yan Xiang | Shen Congxing | Younger brother of Shen Congying and a close friend of Gu Tingye. He played an instrumental role in the war supporting the current emperor. After the death of his first wife, he takes her younger sister Zou Ping as a concubine, causing social and familial conflicts. Ordered by the Emperor to enter a political marriage with Zhang Guifen, the daughter of a decorated general, his initial reluctance and indulgence of his concubine create tension. Over time, he works to reconcile with his wife and stabilize his household. |
| Jiao Qiyue | Elder Lady Zou | Shen Congxing's first wife. She sacrificed herself during the war, impersonating the Empress to protect her. |
| Wu Xiaoyu | Zhang Guifen | Shen Congxing's second wife and the only child of General Zhang. Initially resistant to her arranged marriage, she struggles with depression but gradually improves her relationship with her husband. She is skilled in polo and, with guidance from Sheng Minglan, works to strengthen her marriage. |
| Chen Mengxi | Zou Ping | Shen Congxing's concubine and younger sister of the Elder Lady Zou. She initially manipulates her position to monopolize her husband's attention but is eventually exiled for endangering her co-wife and household. |
| Wang Yijie | Shen Yuzhen | Younger sister of Shen Congying who resents Zou Ping. |

==== Zhang household ====
| Actor | Character | Introduction |
|---|---|---|
| Wang Yongquan | Duke of State Ying | Father of Zhang Guifen. |
| Hu Qingyun | Duchess Consort of State Ying | Wife of the Duke of State Ying and mother of Zhang Guifen. |
| Tian Miao | Mother Fan | Servant of Zhang Guifen. |

==== Imperial court ====
| Actor | Character | Introduction |
|---|---|---|
| Wei Jinsong | Eunuch Li | Servant of the new Emperor. |
| Yu Zhe | Qingyun | Eunuch serving in the palace. |
| Wu Yujue | Ruichu | Palace maid. |
| Li Yan | Eunuch Zhu | Servant of the Empress Dowager. |
| | Mother Su | Servant of Shen Congying. |
| Cheng Guodong | Han Zhang | Grand Chancellor. |
| Mi Te | Duan Chengyong | General and friend of Gu Tingye; he is falsely accused of rape and murder, preventing him from entering the salt market. |
| Fan Zhechen | Geng Jiechuan | General. |
| Sun Zhengyu | Xie Pingde | Superior officer of Gu Tingye. |
| | Shen Guotao | Father of Shen Hezhen; government official. |
| Dong Zhao | Imperial Physician Zhao | Physician serving in the imperial court. |

==== Other ====
| Actor | Character | Introduction |
|---|---|---|
| Li Ruoning | Prostitute Wei | Confidante of Gu Tingye. |
| Zhang Xinyuan | Yunniang | |
| Hao Shuang | Rong Feiyan | Younger sister of Noble Consort Rong. |

== Production ==
=== Crew ===
The series is produced by Hou Hongliang and Daylight Entertainment, which has produced several successful television series including Nirvana in Fire and Ode to Joy. It is directed by Zhang Kaizhou, known for Love Me If You Dare and Ode to Joy 2. The screenplay is written by Zeng Lu and Wu Tong, who were both co-writers of Battle of Changsha.

=== Casting and filming ===
Pre-production began in April 2017. On May 8, 2017, Zhao Liying was announced as the leading role of Sheng Minglan. Feng Shaofeng was revealed as the male lead on June 20, 2017. The supporting cast was announced in August 2017. Filming began in September 2017 at Hengdian World Studios. The series completed filming in April 2018.

== Soundtrack ==
| No. | Title | Lyrics | Music | Singers | Length |
|---|---|---|---|---|---|
| 1. | ""Don't You Know? (知否知否)"" (Theme song) | Li Qingzhao, Zhang Jingyi | Liu Xuandou | Hu Xia & Yisa Yu |
| 2. | ""Dang Ge (当歌)"" | Zhang Jingyi | Liu Xuandou | Ye Xuanqing |

== Reception ==
The series holds an 8.1 out of 10 rating on Douban and received generally positive reviews. It became a major trending topic on social media, with related hashtags viewed hundreds of millions of times.

The show has been praised for addressing social issues and family dynamics in contemporary China, including traditional preference for male children (重男轻女), the phenomenon of NEET youth (啃老族), and intergenerational conflicts in elder care (家庭养老).

=== Ratings ===
Hunan Satellite TV premiere broadcast ratings
| Air date | Episode | CSM52 City network ratings | | | National Internet ratings | | |
| Air date | Episode | Ratings (%) | Audience share (%) | Timeslot rank | Ratings (%) | Audience share (%) | Timeslot rank |
|---|---|---|---|---|---|---|---|
| 2018-12-25 | 1-2 | 0.608 | 2.39 | 5 | 0.59 | 2.47 | 2 |
| 2018-12-26 | 3-4 | 0.751 | 2.93 | 4 | 0.63 | 2.62 | 2 |
| 2018-12-27 | 5-6 | 0.710 | 2.71 | 4 | 0.65 | 2.68 | 1 |
| 2018-12-28 | 7-8 | 0.737 | 2.79 | 4 | 0.68 | 2.75 | 1 |
| 2018-12-29 | 9 | 0.549 | 1.84 | 5 | 0.61 | 2.04 | 2 |
| 2018-12-30 | 10 | 0.720 | 2.39 | 4 | 0.83 | 2.74 | 1 |
| 2019-01-01 | 11-12 | 0.932 | 3.24 | 3 | 0.81 | 3.08 | 1 |
| 2019-01-02 | 13-14 | 1.003 | 3.75 | 2 | 0.77 | 3.16 | 1 |
| 2019-01-03 | 15-16 | 0.981 | 3.67 | 2 | 0.88 | 3.56 | 1 |
| 2019-01-04 | 17 | 0.599 | 2.06 | 5 | 0.54 | 1.82 | 3 |
| 2019-01-05 | 18 | 0.662 | 2.25 | 5 | 0.71 | 2.37 | 1 |
| 2019-01-06 | 19-20 | 0.995 | 3.49 | 1 | 0.77 | 2.87 | 1 |
| 2019-01-07 | 21-22 | 1.146 | 4.19 | 1 | 0.87 | 3.39 | 1 |
| 2019-01-08 | 23-24 | 1.045 | 3.89 | 1 | 0.99 | 3.94 | 1 |
| 2019-01-09 | 25-26 | 1.102 | 4.06 | 1 | 0.92 | 3.51 | 1 |
| 2019-01-10 | 27-28 | 1.140 | 4.24 | 1 | 1.12 | 4.43 | 1 |
| 2019-01-11 | 29 | 0.715 | 2.51 | 3 | 0.75 | 2.62 | 1 |
| 2019-01-12 | 30 | 0.876 | 2.98 | 1 | 0.93 | 3.19 | 1 |
| 2019-01-13 | 31-32 | 1.211 | 4.38 | 1 | 1.14 | 4.34 | 1 |
| 2019-01-14 | 33-34 | 1.418 | 5.26 | 1 | 1.36 | 5.25 | 1 |
| 2019-01-15 | 35-36 | 1.536 | 5.63 | 1 | 1.52 | 5.90 | 1 |
| 2019-01-16 | 37-38 | 1.568 | 5.61 | 1 | 1.49 | 5.61 | 1 |
| 2019-01-17 | 39-40 | 1.552 | 5.71 | 1 | 1.43 | 5.48 | 1 |
| 2019-01-18 | 41 | 1.105 | 3.90 | 1 | 1.05 | 3.66 | 1 |
| 2019-01-19 | 42 | 1.251 | 4.27 | 1 | 1.33 | 4.64 | 1 |
| 2019-01-20 | 43-44 | 1.549 | 5.32 | 1 | 1.51 | 5.41 | 1 |
| 2019-01-21 | 45-46 | 1.803 | 6.60 | 1 | 1.68 | 6.37 | 1 |
| 2019-01-22 | 47-48 | 1.670 | 5.94 | 1 | 1.49 | 5.53 | 1 |
| 2019-01-23 | 49-50 | 1.739 | 6.32 | 1 | 1.69 | 6.42 | 1 |
| 2019-01-24 | 51-52 | 1.610 | 5.82 | 1 | 1.58 | 5.89 | 1 |
| 2019-01-25 | 53 | 0.864 | 3.07 | 4 | 0.87 | 3.07 | 1 |
| 2019-01-26 | 54 | 1.146 | 4.03 | 1 | 1.06 | 3.74 | 1 |
| 2019-01-27 | 55-56 | 1.505 | 5.32 | 1 | 1.43 | 5.22 | 1 |
| 2019-01-28 | 57-58 | 1.751 | 6.31 | 1 | 1.62 | 5.90 | 1 |
| 2019-01-30 | 59-60 | 1.791 | 6.42 | 1 | 1.67 | 6.12 | 1 |
| 2019-01-31 | 61-62 | 1.722 | 6.18 | 1 | 1.69 | 6.12 | 1 |
| 2019-02-01 | 63 | 0.985 | 3.54 | 2 | 0.92 | 3.41 | 1 |
| 2019-02-02 | 64 | 1.303 | 4.55 | 1 | 1.37 | 4.89 | 1 |
| 2019-02-03 | 65-66 | 1.689 | 5.89 | 1 | 1.68 | 5.87 | 1 |
| 2019-02-04 | 67 | 0.881 | 2.97 | 1 | 1.20 | 3.68 | 1 |
| 2019-02-06 | 68-69 | 1.395 | 5.52 | 1 | 1.46 | 5.72 | 1 |
| 2019-02-07 | 70-71 | 1.482 | 5.73 | 1 | 1.70 | 6.49 | 1 |
| 2019-02-08 | 72 | 1.224 | 4.51 | 1 | 1.34 | 4.96 | 1 |
| 2019-02-09 | 73 | 1.374 | 4.96 | 1 | 1.35 | 4.78 | 1 |
| 2019-02-10 | 74 | 1.426 | 4.99 | 1 | 1.42 | 4.91 | 1 |
| 2019-02-11 | 75-76 | 2.061 | 7.36 | 1 | 1.62 | 5.93 | 1 |
| 2019-02-12 | 77 | 2.252 | 7.50 | 1 | 1.99 | 6.68 | 1 |
| 2019-02-13 | 78 | 2.211 | 7.30 | 1 | 2.03 | 6.71 | 1 |
| Average ratings | | 1.288 | 4.65 | / | 1.21 | 4.54 | / |

- Highest ratings are marked in red, lowest ratings are marked in blue.

=== Awards and nominations ===
| Award | Category | Nominated work | Result | Ref. |
|---|---|---|---|---|
| 25th Shanghai Television Festival | Best Television Series | The Story of Minglan | Nominated | |
| 25th Shanghai Television Festival | Best Director | Zhang Kaizhou | Nominated | |
| 25th Shanghai Television Festival | Best Adapted Screenplay | Zeng Lu, Wu Tong | Nominated | |
| 25th Shanghai Television Festival | Best Actress | Zhao Liying | Nominated | |
| 25th Shanghai Television Festival | Best Supporting Actor | Zhu Yilong | Nominated | |
| 25th Shanghai Television Festival | Best Supporting Actress | Liu Lin | Nominated | |
| 25th Shanghai Television Festival | Best Art Direction | | Nominated | |
| 26th Huading Awards | Best Actor (Historical drama) | Feng Shaofeng | Nominated | |
| 26th Huading Awards | Best Actress (Historical drama) | Zhao Liying | Nominated | |
| Golden Bud – The Fourth Network Film and Television Festival | Best Actor | Feng Shaofeng | Nominated | |
| Golden Bud – The Fourth Network Film and Television Festival | Best Actor | Zhu Yilong | Nominated | |
| Golden Bud – The Fourth Network Film and Television Festival | Best Actress | Zhao Liying | Nominated | |
| Baidu Fudian Awards | Top Ten Television Series | The Story of Minglan | Won | |
| 30th China TV Golden Eagle Award | Outstanding Television Series | The Story of Minglan | Won | |
| 30th China TV Golden Eagle Award | Best Actress | Zhao Liying | Nominated | |
| 30th China TV Golden Eagle Award | Audience's Choice for Actress | Zhao Liying | Won | |
| 30th China TV Golden Eagle Award | Audience's Choice for Actor | Zhu Yilong | Nominated | |
| 30th China TV Golden Eagle Award | Best Cinematography | Li Baichao | Nominated | |
| 30th China TV Golden Eagle Award | Best Original Soundtrack | Zhi Fou Zhi Fou | Nominated | |
