= Zhu Yilong =

Chinese actor

- Zhu in 2022
- Born: April 16, 1988 (age 38); Wuhan, Hubei, China
- Education: Beijing Film Academy
- Occupation: Actor
- Years active: 2009–present
- Agent(s): Oriental Feiyun (former), Zhu Yilong Studio
- Awards: Best Actor – Golden Rooster Awards; 2022 Lighting Up the Stars – Mo Sanmei

Chinese name
- Simplified Chinese: 朱一龙
- Traditional Chinese: 朱一龍
Transcriptions
Standard Mandarin
- Hanyu Pinyin: Zhū Yīlóng

Zhu Yilong (Chinese: 朱一龙, born April 16, 1988) is a Chinese actor. He first gained recognition in television series such as Guardian (2018), The Story of Minglan (2018), Reunion: The Sound of the Providence (2020), and The Rebel (2021). Zhu is best known for his performance as Mo Sanmei in the drama film Lighting Up the Stars (2022), for which he won the Best Actor awards at the 35th Golden Rooster Awards and 37th Hundred Flowers Awards. He continued to star in high-profile films including Lost in the Stars (2022) and Only the River Flows (2023), the latter of which premiered at the 2023 Cannes Film Festival.

Zhu is the first Chinese Global Ambassador for World Wildlife Fund since 2019, and has been committed to campaigns that raise public awareness of protecting endangered species and promoting biodiversity.

== Early life ==
Zhu Yilong was born in Wuhan, Hubei, on April 16, 1988. His father was a Sanda coach. He graduated from the Beijing Film Academy with a bachelor's degree in performance in 2010.

== Career ==
=== 2009–2016: Beginnings at Oriental Feiyun ===
In 2008, Zhu debuted in the TV film Zai Sheng Yuan as an assassin. He went on to act in several TV films over the following years; such as The Snatched Bride, Blood-Colored Deep Mansion, Curse of the Blood Jade and Terror Eyes. One of his most notable roles in his earlier career is Zhu Changxun in the Da Ming Pin Fei film series; as well as General Junshi in Legend of the Daming Palace. He also portrayed a national hero in the war drama Fanjingshan Story, and played the male lead in the wuxia film Ci Fei and romance comedy film Love Retake.

In 2014, Zhu first gained recognition for his performance in the period romance drama Love Three Lives, which won him the "Most Anticipated Actor" award at the Asian Influence Awards Oriental Ceremony. In 2015, he gained increased recognition after starring as Ying Ji in the hit historical drama The Legend of Mi Yue.

In 2016, Zhu starred in wuxia drama The Shaw Eleven Lang, based on the novel of the same name by Gu Long. He played the main antagonist, Lian Chengbi. Zhu's performance earned him the Best Supporting Actor award at TVS Award Ceremony. Zhu starred in another adaptation of Gu Long's novel, playing the protagonist in Border Town Prodigal. He received positive reviews for his performance and his popularity rose significantly afterwards.

=== 2017–2019: Rising popularity ===
In 2017, Zhu starred alongside Ady An in the romantic comedy drama Royal Sister Returns. The same year, he starred alongside Aaron Kwok and Zhao Liying in the spy thriller film Eternal Wave.

In 2018, Zhu starred in the science fiction mystery web drama Guardian, where he played three roles. The series developed a cult following online, leading to a surge in popularity for Zhu. He won the Popular Actor award at the 2018 Weibo Movie Awards Ceremony. Forbes China listed him under their 30 Under 30 Asia 2018 list which consisted of 30 influential people under 30 years old who have had a substantial effect in their fields. He then starred in the historical drama The Story of Minglan produced by Daylight Entertainment. He received positive reviews for his role as wealthy gentleman who is the female lead's first love, and was nominated for the Best Supporting Actor award at the Magnolia Awards for his performance.

In 2019, Zhu appeared in CCTV New Year's Gala for the first time, performing the song and dance item "Youth Rave It Up". He starred in the workplace romance drama My True Friend as an interior designer, and was nominated for the Best Supporting Actor award at the Asian Television Awards. The same year, he was nominated for the Most Promising Actor award at the China Movie Channel (CCTV-6) M List for his role as a soldier in the film My People, My Country. For his performance in various works, Zhu was awarded the Best Actor in the Emerald Category at the 6th The Actors of China Award Ceremony. That year, Zhu ranked 17th on Forbes China Celebrity 100 list.

=== 2020–present: Breakthrough in Zhu Studio ===
In 2020, Zhu portrayed Wu Xie in the tomb-raiding web series Reunion: The Sound of the Providence, adapted from the Daomu Biji series. Zhu also sang on three soundtracks for the drama. The series topped the index charts at iQiyi upon premiere, and received positive reviews. Zhu was praised for his portrayal of Wu Xie. He is set to star in the modern romance drama To Dear Myself opposite Liu Shishi. In April, he began filming the spy drama The Rebel. He ranked 12th on Forbes China Celebrity 100 list.

In 2021, Zhu starred in the critically acclaimed Republican Drama The Rebel, where he won the Tencent White Paper Award for Best TV drama actor. Also in 2021, Zhu Yilong sign on for an indie film about the Funeral Industry in China, in a Wuhan-based production - Lighting Up the Stars. This film tells the story of an ex convict undertaker who encounters an orphan girl who changes his life. Later in 2021, Zhu starred in the disaster Movie - Cloudy Mountain, and a tribute movie to the epidemic situation in Wuhan, Embrace Again - where both films amassed a collective total box office of almost 1.4 billion RMB.

In the spring of 2022, Zhu sign on for the mystery thriller film Lost in the Stars. In the summer of 2022, Lighting Up the Stars broke 1.7 billion RMB at the domestic box office, making history in the Chinese Summer Family Film Category. Also in summer 2022, Zhu was named the ambassador for the Hundred Flower Awards Film Festival in Wuhan where he picked up an award for best actor. He won the best actor at the 2022 Changchun film festival for his performance in Embrace Again, and won Golden Rooster Awards' Best Actor for his performance in Lighting Up the Stars.

== Filmography ==
=== Film ===
Year	English title	Chinese title	Role	Notes	Ref.
2010	Confucius	孔子	Wei ambassador		
2013	Love Retake	爱情不NG	Yan Jige		
2016	The Nursery 3D	育婴室3D	Meng Shaohui		
2017	Yang and His Summer	胡杨的夏天	Hu Yang		
2017	Eternal Wave	密战	Cen Zimo		
2019	My People, My Country	我和我的祖国	Song Leqiang	Segment: "Going Home"	
2021	1921	1921	Zhou Enlai		
2021	Cloudy Mountain	峰爆	Hong Yizhou		
2021	Embrace Again	穿过寒冬拥抱你	Ye Ziyang		
2022	Lighting Up The Stars	人生大事	Mo Sanmei		
2022	Lost in the Stars	消失的她	He Fei		
2023	Only the River Flows	河边的错误	Ma Zhe		
2023	The Volunteers: To the War	志愿军：雄兵出击	Li Xiang	End credits cameo	
2024	Land of Broken Hearts	负负得正	Huang Zhenkai		
2024	The Volunteers: The Battle of Life and Death	志愿军：存亡之战	Li Xiang		
2025	Dongji Rescue	东极岛	Ah Bi		
2026	Scare Out	惊蛰无声	Huang Kai		
2026	V	空枪	Man Tsz-keung		

=== Television series ===
Year	English title	Chinese title	Role	Notes	Ref.
2011	Fanjingshan Story	风雨梵净山	Sun Rubo		
2012	Wang Yang Ming	王阳明	Zhu Houzhao		
2012	Weird Doctor Wen Sankuai	怪医文三块	Hai Dongshen		
2014	Family Banquet	家宴	Feng Douzi		
2014	Love Three Lives	情定三生	Chi Rui		
2015	The Legend of Mi Yue	芈月传	Ying Ji		
2016	The Shaw Eleven Lang	新萧十一郎	Lian Chengbi		
2016	My Love to Tell You	我的爱对你说	Fan Wei		
2016	Border Town Prodigal	新边城浪子	Fu Hongxue		
2017	Royal Sister Returns	御姐归来	He Kaixin		
2017	As Flowers Fade and Fly Across the Sky	花谢花飞花满天	Hua Wuxie		
2018	Guardian	镇魂	Shen Wei / Black Robe Envoy / Ye Zun		
2018	Granting You a Dreamlike Life	许你浮生若梦	Luo Fusheng / Cheng Musheng / Luo Qingeng		
2018	The Story of Minglan	知否？知否？应是绿肥红瘦	Qi Heng		
2019	Skynet Action	天网行动	Pang Jia (Note: 2012 production)		
2019	My True Friend	我的真朋友	Jing Ran		
2020	Reunion: The Sound of the Providence	重启之极海听雷	Wu Xie	Season 1–2	
2020	To Dear Myself	亲爱的自己	Chen Yiming		
2021	The Rebel	叛逆者	Lin Nansheng		
2021	Crossroad Bistro	北辙南辕	Lu Wei	Cameo	

=== Short film ===
Year	English title	Chinese title	Role	Notes	Ref.
2010	Night Lord	夜郎	Yang Zhong	Special Mentioned, FIPRESCI, Hong Kong International Film Festival 2010	
2011	Legend of the Daming Palace	大明宫传奇	General Junshi		
2018	Clown	丑	Chou	Short film	
2019	Youthful China in the Headlines	头条里的青春中国	Deng Jiaxia	Short film	
2019	Save the Black Rhino	看不见的黑犀牛	Himself	by World Wild Fund	
2019	Tracking of Wild Giant Panda	大熊猫追踪之旅	Himself	by World Wild Fund	
2021	Along the Elephants' Wrinkles	沿着大象的纹路	Himself	by World Wild Fund	
2022	Biodiversity in Baima Jokul National Natural Reserve	山海生万物	Himself	by World Wild Fund	

=== Television film ===
Year	English title	Chinese title	Role	Ref.
2009	Another Lifetime of Fate	再生缘	Ruan Ying	
2009	Snatched Bride	抢来的新娘	Xiao Ziwei	
2009	Bloody Mansion	血色深宅	Xue Zimei	
2009	Blood Jade Curse	血玉咒	Zhou Yubai	
2010	Treasure Hunting	宝藏寻踪	Shangguan Yunfeng	
2010	Da Ming Pin Fei Series	大明嫔妃系列	Zhu Changxun	
2010	Wrong Marriage	错嫁	Shen Fang	
2010	Terror Eyes	胭脂劫	Ye Cang	
2010	Shen Gui Si Yun	深闺疑云	He Tianyu	
2011	Jue Mi Shi Ming	绝密使命	Jin Tiexin	
2011	Cinderella	灰姑娘	Luo Huaifeng	
2011	Ci Fei	刺妃	Ye Fan	
2011	The White Fox Spirit	白狐仙	Yu Yihong	
2011	Duo Er War	朵儿的战争	Mai He	
2011	Shen Shi Da Dao	绅士大盗	Wu Xundong	
2011	The Gates of Hell	鬼门关	Gong Tiexin	
2011	San Ye Ren	猎野人	Ye Ren	
2012	Zhan Di Qing Tian	战地情天	Jin Feiyu	
2012	Tou Kui Zhe	偷窥者	Jiang Xinbai	
2012	Sha Ji Si Fu	杀机四伏	Tan Wei	
2012	Gu Le Qing Chun	鼓乐青春	Lin Feng	
2015	Following Your Heart	贴着你的心跳	Xie Yuhang	

=== Music video appearances ===
Year	English title	Chinese title	Role
2009	"Love Rotate"	爱转移	Yan Chubin
2009	"Angel's Song"	天使之歌	Yan Chubin

== Discography ==
Year	English title	Chinese title	Album	Notes/Ref.
2014	"Eternal Star"	恒星	Love Three Lives OST	
2016	"I Will Wait"	我会等	The Nursery OST	
2017	"Crazy Love"	疯狂的爱	Royal Sister Returns OST	
2018	"Flight of Time"	时间飞行	Guardian OST	with Bai Yu
2018	"Earth Star Meets Sea Star"	地星撞海星		with Bai Yu
2018	"Granting You a Dreamlike Life"	许你浮生若梦	Granting You a Dreamlike Life OST	with An Yuexi
2018	"Where Dreams Begin"	梦开始的地方		Charity song for 人人都是志愿者 campaign
2019	"Youth Rave It Up"	青春跃起来		Performance for CCTV Spring Gala with Li Yifeng
2019	"Dragon Text"	龙文		with Dong Wenhua
2019	"The Light Upwards"	向上的光		Theme song of 中国Young project
2019	"My Motherland and I"	我和我的祖国	My People My Country OST	with Chen Feiyu, Liu Haoran, Ou Hao & Zhou Dongyu
2019	"Romance Between Mountain and Water"	山水相恋		with Jiang Shuying
2020	"Hello 2020"	你好2020		Performance for CCTV Spring Gala with Li Xian, Li Qin, Ma Sichun & Zhou Dongyu
2020	"Wuhan, How Are You"	武汉，你好吗		Support song for fighting SARS-CoV-2 in Wuhan
2020	"Reboot"	重启	Reunion: The Sound of the Providence OST	
2020	"Iron Triangle"	铁三角	Reunion: The Sound of the Providence OST	with Huang Junjie & Chen Minghao
2020	"Jumping Downward"	往下跳	Reunion: The Sound of the Providence OST	
2020	"Dear myself"	亲爱的自己	To Dear Myself	With Keyso
2020	"Dear you"	亲爱的你	To Dear Myself	
2021	"The Rebel"	叛逆者	The Rebel OST	

== Bibliography ==
Year	English title	Chinese title	Notes/Ref.
2019	Depart	出发	

== Other activities ==
In 2018, Zhu was named the ambassador for the China-Australia Tourism Promotion.

In 2018, Zhu was named the ambassador for the inaugural Hainan Island International Film Festival.

In 2019, it was announced that Madame Tussauds Shanghai and Madame Tussauds Hong Kong would each display a different wax figure of Zhu. The first wax figure was officially displayed at Madame Tussauds Shanghai on 20 Dec 2019. The second wax figure was being officially displayed at Madame Tussauds Hong Kong on 20 Oct 2021.

In 2019, Zhu was appointed the WWF Ambassador for Global Wildlife Crime Campaign to call on public to reduce the demand for ivory and other endangered species’ products.

In January 2020 he donated $150,000 to fight COVID-19 in his hometown of Wuhan.

== Awards and nominations ==
Year	Award	Category	Nominated work	Results	Ref.
2015	Asian Influence Awards Oriental Ceremony	Most Promising Actor	Love Three Lives	Won	
2017	13th TV Drama South Awarding Ceremony	Best Supporting Actor	The Shaw Eleven Lang	Won	
2017	InStyle iLady Icon Awards	Trending Actor of the Year	—N/a	Won	
2018	14th TV Drama South Awarding Ceremony	Male Lead of the Year	Border Town Prodigal	Won	
2018	Weibo Movie Awards Ceremony	Popularity Award	—N/a	Won	
2018	Q China Music Awards	Most Popular Crossover Singer	—N/a	Won	
2018	Q China Music Awards	Most Popular Soundtrack	"Flight of Time"	Won	
2018	15th Esquire Man At His Best Awards	Most Promising Actor	—N/a	Won	
2018	Powerstar Award Ceremony	Most Influential Actor	—N/a	Won	
2018	10th China TV Drama Awards	Charismatic Young Actor	Guardian	Won	
2019	Film and TV Role Model 2018 Ranking	Actor of the Year	Guardian	Won	
2019	Weibo Awards Ceremony	Weibo God Award	—N/a	Won	
2019	Hubei Internet Summit	Person of the Year	—N/a	Won	
2019	4th China Quality Television Drama Ceremony	Sina Weibo Most Talked About Celebrity Online	—N/a	Won	
2019	4th China Quality Television Drama Ceremony	Most Commercially Valuable Star	—N/a	Won	
2019	25th Shanghai Television Festival	Best Supporting Actor	The Story of Minglan	Nominated	
2019	4th Golden Spider Academic Award	Best Actor	Guardian	Won	
2019	4th Golden Spider Academic Award	Most Popular Actor	Guardian	Won	
2019	GQ 2019 Men of the Year	Goodwill Ambassador	—N/a	Won	
2019	24th Asian Television Awards	Best Supporting Actor	My True Friend	Nominated	
2019	Golden Bud - The Fourth Network Film And Television Festival	Best Actor	The Story of Minglan, My True Friend	Nominated	
2019	6th The Actors of China Award Ceremony	Best Actor (Emerald Category)	The Story of Minglan, My True Friend	Won	
2019	China Movie Channel (CCTV-6) M List	Most Promising Actor	My People, My Country	Nominated	
2019	Powerstar Awards Ceremony	Most Popular Chinese Actor	—N/a	Won	
2020	China Literature Awards Ceremony	Quality Actor of the Year	—N/a	Won	
2020	30th China TV Golden Eagle Award	Audience's Choice for Actor	—N/a	Nominated	
2020	China News Weekly Influential People Award	Performing Artist of the Year	—N/a	Won	
2020	iQiyi All-Star Carnival	Quality Actor Of the Year	Reunion: The Sound of the Providence	Won	
2020	Jinri Toutiao Awards Ceremony	Most Noticed Actor	Reunion: The Sound of the Providence	Won	
2020	Film and TV Role Model 2019 Ranking	Most Popular Supporting Actor	The Story of Minglan	Won	
2021	Film and TV Role Model 2020 Ranking	Most Popular Leading Actor	Reunion: The Sound of the Providence	Won	
2021	Weibo Movie Awards Ceremony	Expressive Actor of the Year		Won	
2022	Weibo Movie Awards Ceremony	Remarkable Actor of the Year		Won	
2022	Golden Deer, 17th Changchun Film Festival	Best Actor	Embrace Again	Won	
2022	Peony Award, 32nd Zhejiang TV Award	Best Actor	The Rebel	Won	
2022	35th Golden Rooster Awards	Best Actor (最佳男主角)	Lighting Up the Stars	Won	

=== Listicles ===
Name of publisher, year listed, name of listicle, and placement
Year	Publisher	Listicle	Placement	Ref.
2019	Forbes China	Celebrity 100	17th	
2020	Forbes China	Celebrity 100	12th	
