= Vacation of Love =

2021 Chinese television series

- Also known as: Holiday Warmth
- Starring
- Country of origin: China
- Original language: Mandarin
- No. of episodes: 35

Vacation of Love
- Simplified Chinese: 假日暖洋洋
Transcriptions
Standard Mandarin
- Hanyu Pinyin: Ri

Vacation of Love' (Chinese: 假日暖洋洋; pinyin: Ri) Produced by iQIYI and created by Qimeng Pictures, this series is directed by Yao Xiaofeng and stars Yao Chen, Bai Yu, and Zhang Jingchu in leading roles, with Dong Chengpeng making a special guest appearance as a lead. It tells the story of three groups of guests and the series of joyful, humorous, and romantic events that unfold during their seven-day vacation at the "True Love Resort" over the 2021 Spring Festival. This series is China's first lighthearted comedy series released during the Lunar New Year season. In the behind-the-scenes special, the director and producer also separately stated that they intend to develop *Vacation of Love* into a series of Lunar New Year dramas. This series is unrelated in terms of plot to the TV series *Vacation of Love 2*, which premiered in 2022.

== Synopsis ==
Xu Keyi, an entertainment agent nearing her thirtieth birthday, has single-handedly carved out a successful niche for herself in the cutthroat world of show business. On the eve of the Lunar New Year, she brings her client, the artist Gao Junyu, to a resort for a performance gig. She believes that her decade of arduous sacrifice is finally about to be rewarded with a blissful romance—but her hopes are dashed. Heartbroken and despondent, Xu Keyi retreats to the seaside to drown her sorrows in alcohol; it is there that Hou Hao—a warm-hearted man who has been quietly watching over her with concern—unexpectedly stumbles into her life. Their relationship heats up rapidly; during this unexpected vacation—a time marked by repeated setbacks in both her career and love life—it seems that only Hou Hao, with his laid-back approach to life, can offer Xu Keyi the chance for a fresh start. The guests arriving at the resort for the New Year holiday are a colorful bunch, including a young couple, Song Xiaoke and Chen Binbin, who have arrived with their entire extended family in tow. Song Xiaoke—a formidable female entrepreneur—had long grown fed up with Chen Binbin's indolence and impulsively divorced him. However, to ensure the elders enjoy a happy New Year, the pair is forced to grit their teeth and pretend to be a loving couple, planning to keep their divorce a secret until the holiday has passed. Meanwhile, Chen Binbin—who found the divorce "satisfying in the moment" but now faces the "fiery ordeal" of trying to win his wife back—racks his brains at the resort, devising every possible scheme to woo and reconcile with her, resulting in a series of comical mishaps. Dr. Wen—a member of an anti-epidemic medical team—has also been invited to the resort for a well-deserved vacation. He brings along his daughter, Wen Ruonan, hoping to seize this opportunity to make up for the lack of companionship and affection he has shown her in their daily lives. However, Wen Ruonan is currently in the throes of rebellious adolescence; still harboring deep-seated resentment toward her father over her mother's passing, she shares a tense and strained relationship with him.

== Cast ==
- Bai Yu as Hou Hao

== Reviews ==
=== A "Variety-Show Style" Lunar New Year Light Comedy ===
As a Lunar New Year light comedy, *Vacation of Love* is an anthology-style production. Designed as a family friendly show, to be able to be watched by family audiences.

=== Yao Chen and Bai Yu’s Scenes Were Great—A Pity There Were So Few of Them ===
For a long time, the concept of a "New Year's贺岁" TV series—specifically tailored for the holiday season—was virtually non-existent, and creators similarly lacked the proactive mindset to produce such content. *Vacation of Love* (假日暖洋洋), however, has broken new ground in this regard, generating significant buzz even before its premiere. In the lead-up to the show's debut, clips featuring the on-screen interactions between its lead stars, Yao Chen and Bai Yu, circulated widely across Weibo. Yao Chen's return to the comedy genre—coupled with the sweet, romantic dynamic between her character (a strong-willed "alpha female") and Bai Yu's (a younger, warm-hearted gentleman)—certainly offered plenty of appeal and served to whet the audience's appetite. Yet, as many viewers discovered after tuning in, the series' most brilliant moments were, for the most part, already contained within the previously released trailers. Furthermore, despite the trailers focusing heavily on Yao Chen and Bai Yu, the actual screen time shared by the duo in the show itself turned out to be far less than anticipated—to the point of being "paltry." In response to this critique, the director offered a reply, stating: "Naturally, everyone loves watching sweet romances—but sweet romance is not the entirety of life; a drama grounded in realism must be firmly rooted in real-world reality." Furthermore, the director went on to address, point by point, the specific ways in which the actors aligned with their respective characters.

== Awards and nominations ==
- Ranked #82 on the "2020–2021 China TV Drama Satisfaction Survey Top 100 List" at the 32nd Huading Awards
- Nominated for Urban Drama of the Year at the 2021 Weibo TV Drama Awards

== Controversy ==
On February 6, 2021, a netizen posted online alleging that the series *Holiday Warmth* had unauthorizedly used their parents' wedding photograph to depict the parents of a fictional character in the show—a character who is portrayed as having passed away prematurely. On the same day, the production team behind *Holiday Warmth* issued an apology, stating that the incident was the result of negligence on the part of the crew. They pledged to replace the offending content, dismiss the staff members involved, and implement stricter oversight of their personnel.
