= Detective L (TV series) =

2019 Chinese television series

- Starring
- Country of origin: China
- Original language: Mandarin

Detective L
- Simplified Chinese: 绅探
Transcriptions

Detective L(Chinese: 绅探) is a 2019 Chinese period drama set in the Republican era, starring Bai Yu and You Jingru. Tencent Video premiered on April 18, 2019. In Taiwan, it is broadcast exclusively by WeTV.

== Synopsis ==
In 1930s Shanghai—an era of song, dance, and decadent opulence—while the city's inhabitants lay lost in slumber, a series of bizarre mysteries quietly unfolded in its hidden corners. Qin Xiaoman (played by You Jingru), a beautiful young woman fresh out of police academy and harboring the ambition to become a brilliant detective, arrived in the British Concession. She took up residence in the Sullivan Apartments, where she became both a neighbor and a colleague to the renowned Luo Fei (played by Bai Yu)—a celebrated police consultant known as the "Divine Detective" for his track record of solving baffling cases. Initially, their clashing personalities made them instant adversaries who bickered the moment they met; yet, through a twist of fate, they were compelled to join forces and solve cases together.

== Cast ==
- Bai Yu as Luo Fei
- You Jingru as Qin Xiaoman
