= The Rebel (Chinese TV series) =

2021 Chinese television series

- Promotional poster
- Chinese: 叛逆者
- Hanyu Pinyin: Pànnì zhě
- Genre: Suspense; Historical
- Based on: The Rebel (叛逆者) by Bi Yu
- Written by: Qin Wen; Li Xiaoming; Zhou You; Li Qixiao; Zhang Bin; Guan Jingfeng; Chen Ting
- Directed by: Zhou You
- Starring: Zhu Yilong; Tong Yao; Wang Zhiwen
- Country of origin: China
- Original language: Mandarin
- No. of seasons: 1
- No. of episodes: 43

Production
- Executive producers: Yang Bei; Gong Yu
- Production location: Shanghai
- Production companies: New Classics Media iQIYI

Original release
- Network: CCTV-8 iQIYI
- Release: June 7 – June 26, 2021

The Rebel (Chinese: 叛逆者) is a 2021 Chinese historical thriller television series based on Bi Yu's novel of the same name, directed by Zhou You and starring Zhu Yilong, Tong Yao and Wang Zhiwen. The series airs on CCTV-8 and iQIYI starting June 7, 2021.

== Plot ==
In 1936, Lin Nan Sheng, a student of the fascist-influenced China Reconstruction Society cadre training class, was taken to Shanghai to participate in the arrest of the underground party. In the process, Lin Nan Sheng was constantly attracted by the sense of mission of the Chinese Communist Party members for the country. Lin Nan Sheng was brave and resolute in the fight against Japanese imperial troops, and he repeatedly gained achievement. He stood with the CCP many times and used his special status in the military to provide great help to the underground party. After the Second Sino-Japanese War, Lin Nan Sheng grew up into a true Communist.

== Cast ==
- Zhu Yilong as Lin Nansheng
- Tong Yao as Zhu Yizhen
- Wang Zhiwen as Gu Shenyan
- Wang Yang as Chen Moqun
- Zhu Zhu as Lan Xinjie
- Li Qiang as Ji Zhongyuan
- Zhang Zixian as Wang Shian
- Yao Anlian as Zhu Xiaoxian
- Yuan Wenkang as Meng Annan
- Dai Xu as Zuo Qiuming
- Xia Minghao as Sun Fuan
- Zhang Yihang as Zhu Licheng

== Soundtrack ==
No.	Title	Lyrics	Music	Length
1.	"The Rebel (叛逆者)" (Theme song)	Zhang Yi Lin, Huang Ran	Zhu Yilong
2.	"Four Seasons: June Boat Song (四季·六月船歌)" (Piano Instrumental)
3.	"The Shadow Behind (背后的影子)" (Insert song)	Zhang Yi Lin, Huang Ran	Ayanga
4.	"Be Honest (坦诚)" (Insert song)	Zhang Yi Lin, Huang Ran	Liu Xijun
