= Stephy Qi =

Chinese singer and actress

Qi Wei
- Born: Chengdu, Sichuan, China
- Other name: Stephy Qi
- Education: Zhejiang University of Media and Communications
- Occupations: Actress; singer
- Years active: 2006–present
- Spouse: Lee Seung-hyun (m. 2014)
- Children: 2

Chinese name
- Simplified Chinese: 戚薇
Transcriptions
Standard Mandarin
- Hanyu Pinyin: Qī Wēi
- Musical career
- Label: Ocean Butterflies International

Qi Wei (Chinese: 戚薇), also known as Stephy Qi, is a Chinese singer and actress.

== Career ==
Qi debuted as a singer after participating in the talent program My Show, and formed a duo with Yuan Chengjie. The duo rose to fame with the song Wai Tan Shi Ba Hao (外滩十八号), which won the "Best Duet" award at the Global Chinese Music Awards.

Thereafter, Qi ventured into acting and became known to audiences after starring in historical drama Beauty's Rival in Palace in 2010. In 2011, she signed a contract with Ocean Butterflies International and released her debut album If Love Forgets. The same year, she also starred in the highly rated drama My Daughters and released a soundtrack for the series. Qi is also known for starring in modern suspense drama Unbeatable (2010), romantic comedy drama Love Wakes Up (2011) and Gong'an fiction series Young Sherlock (2014). Qi won the Most Popular Actress award at the China TV Drama Awards.

After her short hiatus for childbirth, Qi returned to the screen with modern romance drama I Am DuLala in 2015. In 2016, she was cast in John Woo's action thriller film, Manhunt.

== Personal life ==
In 2014, Qi married Korean-American actor Lee Seung-hyun in Las Vegas. Their daughter, Lucky, was born in January 2015. Their second child, a boy, was born in October 2022.

== Discography ==
=== Albums ===
Year	English title	Chinese title	Album	Notes
2011	If Love Forgets	如果爱忘了	Mandarin	
2013	L to V Secret	L to V秘密	Mandarin	
2013	The Lost	失窃之物	Mandarin	
2014	Hello Goodbye	你好,再见	Mandarin	
2015	My Fresh Girlfriend	我的新鲜女友	Mandarin	

=== Singles ===
Year	English title	Chinese title	Album	Notes
2010	"Be Your Other Half"	做你的一半	—N/a	with Yuan Chengjie
2010	"Dazzle Brilliantly"	耀出彩	—N/a	with Yuan Chengjie
2010	"Perfect Match"	我的绝配	—N/a	with Yuan Chengjie
2010	"Love You Too Much	太过爱你	My Daughter OST	
2011	"Between Black & White"	黑白之間	Unbeatable 2 OST	with Van Fan
2011	"Confiscate"	沒收	Unbeatable 2 OST	
2012	"On My Way"	跑出一片天	On My Way OST	
2012	"Love Has No Reason"	爱情没什么道理	My Economical Man OST	
2012	"Letting Go For Love"	放开爱	My Economical Man OST	
2013	"In Order to Meet You"	为了遇见你	Love Destiny OST	with Aska Yang
2013	"Love Has Its Own Free Will"	爱情自有天意	Love Destiny OST	
2013	"Forgive Him"	原谅他	Love Destiny OST	
2013	"Us"	我們我們	Love Destiny OST	
2013	"The World of Xianxia: Let Slip"	仙侠世界之错过	—N/a	Theme song of 仙侠世界
2014	"You Are The Right One"	你是对的人	Love is Back OST	with Lee Jun-ho
2014	"Lucky Lucky"	—N/a	—N/a	Theme song of Candy Crush Saga with Lee Seung-hyun
2015	"Forget and Remember"	忘了去記得	I am Du Lala OST	
2017	"Dream of Zhu Xian: Spring Life"	梦诛缘·春生	—N/a	Anniversary theme song of 梦幻诛仙
2017	"Someone"	有个人	April Star OST	
2017	"Rainy Day"	雨天	April Star OST	
2017	"Mirroring"	镜像	Manhunt OST	with Vava

== Filmography ==
=== Film ===
Year	English title	Chinese title	Role	Notes/Ref.
2009	Beauty of Chongqing	重庆美女	Sha Ruoxin	
2011	Coming Back	回马枪	Nie Yinniang	
2012	On My Way	跑出一片天	Cindy	Cameo
2012	Substitute Millionaire	做次有钱人	Lin Pei	
2014	Broadcasting Girl	我的播音系女友	Zhang Liaoliao	
2016	Mission Milano	王牌逗王牌	Tina	Special appearance
2017	Manhunt	追捕	Zhen Tianmei	
2021	Tempting Hearts	有一点动心	Mei Qi	

=== Television series ===
Year	English title	Chinese title	Role	Notes/Ref.
2007	Just Give Me A Call	麻雀爱上凤凰	Qi Wei	
2009	Good Wife and Mother	贤妻良母	Zheng Kelian	
2010	Beauty's Rival in Palace	美人心计	Princess Guantao	
2010	Unbeatable	无懈可击之美女如云	You Xiaorou	
2011	Summer's Desire	泡沫之夏	Ou Chen's fake girlfriend	Cameo
2011	My Daughters	夏家三千金	Xia Youshan	
2011	Unbeatable 2	无懈可击之高手如林	Ye Rou	
2011	Waking Love Up	爱情睡醒了	Mu Zhiqing	
2012	My Economical Man	我的经济适用男	Mo Rou	
2012	Fairytale	童话二分之一	Xiao Xiao	
2013	Love Destiny	爱情自有天意	Cheng Xi	
2014	Surprise	万万没想到：小兵过年	Wang Qige	
2014	Tao of Love	陶之恋	Murong Haiqing	
2014	Young Sherlock	少年神探狄仁杰	Li Wanqing	
2014	Swords of Legends	古剑奇谭	Ye Chenxiang	Special appearance
2014	Love is Back	爱情回来了	Ming Liang	
2016	I am Du Lala	我是杜拉拉	Du Lala	
2016	Singing All Along	秀丽江山之长歌行	Wei Yue	Special appearance
2016	Hello, Joann	你好乔安	Qiao An	
2017	April Star	繁星四月	Ye Fanxing	
2017	Midnight Diner	深夜食堂	Customer	Special appearance
2018	Women in Beijing	北京女子图鉴	Chen Ke	
2019	No Secrets	没有秘密的你	Li Xingran	
2019	For the Holy Guiguzi	谋圣鬼谷子	Jin Shu	
2019	New Dragon Gate Inn	新龙门客栈	Jin Xiangyu	
2021	Humans	你好，安怡	Jiang Li	
2021	Breath of Destiny	一起深呼吸	Zhou Ying	
2023	Under The Microscope	显微镜下的大明之丝绢案	Feng Biyu	

=== Variety show ===
Year	English title	Chinese title	Role	Notes/Ref.
2015	Go to Love	出发吧，爱情	Cast member	First season
2017	Who's the King	挑战的法则	Cast member	
2020	Gagman	认真的嘎嘎们	Cast member	

== Awards and nominations ==
Year	Award	Category	Nominated work	Result	Ref.
2008	Southeast Music Chart Awards	Top 10 Songs	"Wai Tan Shi Ba Hao"	Won	
2008	Global Chinese Music Awards	Most Popular Duet	"Wai Tan Shi Ba Hao"	Won	
2012	ERC Chinese Top Ten Awards	Best Lyrics	"Between Black & White"	Won	
2012	4th China TV Drama Awards	Acting Idol Award	—N/a	Won	
2013	The 1st V Chart Awards	Breakthrough Female Artist (Mainland China)	—N/a	Won	
2013	The 1st V Chart Awards	Best OST (Mainland China)	"Letting Go For Love"	Won	
2013	5th China TV Drama Awards	Most Popular Actress (Mainland China)	Love Destiny	Won	
2014	The 2nd V Chart Awards	Best Music Micro Movie	The Lost	Won	
2015	The 3rd V Chart Awards	Best Cooperation of the Year	"Lucky Lucky"	Won	
2018	24th Huading Awards	Best Actress (Modern Drama)	Women in Beijing	Nominated	
2018	10th China TV Drama Awards	Rising Actor of the Year	—N/a	Won	
2018	Golden Bud – The Third Network Film And Television Festival	Quality Actress	—N/a	Won	
2019	Golden Bud – The Fourth Network Film And Television Festival	Best Actress	No Secrets	Nominated	
2020	7th The Actors of China Awards	Best Actress (Web series)	—N/a	Nominated	
