= Guardian (web series) =

Chinese web series

- Promotional poster
- Also known as: Zhèn Hún
- Genre: Science fiction, Mystery
- Based on: Guardian by Priest
- Written by: Qi Xiaoyu; Ye Fangzhou; Hua Liang
- Starring: Bai Yu; Zhu Yilong
- Opening theme: "We Won't be Falling" by Chen Xueran
- Ending theme: "Just Cared Too Much" by Ning Huanyu
- Country of origin: China
- Original language: Mandarin
- No. of episodes: 40

Production
- Producer: Zhou Yuanzhou
- Production location: Shanghai
- Running time: 45 minutes
- Production companies: Shi Yue Film and Television, Zhe Jiang Sheng Xi Hua Shi, Tai Yang Chuan He Culture and Media, Huan Mi Culture and Communication

Original release
- Network: Youku
- Release: 13 June – 25 July 2018

Guardian (Chinese: 镇魂; pinyin: Zhèn Hún) is a 2018 Chinese web series starring Bai Yu and Zhu Yilong. An adaptation of the 2012 fantasy-danmei web novel of the same name by Priest, the series was released on the video platform Youku between June 13 and July 25, 2018. It follows a detective and a professor who investigate supernatural phenomena. Though the novel depicts their relationship as romantic in nature, the web series depicts the relationship as a platonic friendship with homoerotic subtext as a response to Chinese laws prohibiting depictions of same-sex relationships on television.

The series was widely popular on the internet, and received a total of 1.8 billion views in its streaming platform by August 2018. That same month, Guardian was pulled from Youku amid a crackdown on "harmful and vulgar" internet content, but was later re-uploaded.

== Synopsis ==
Guardian is set on the Earth-like planet of Haixing, populated by a native human population and two alien races — the Yashou, who are able to shapeshift into plants and animals, and the Dixing, superpowered beings who live deep underground. The three races have enjoyed a peaceful co-existence since the arrival of the Yashou and Dixing over ten thousand years ago, broken only by an ancient war declared by the Dixing after a meteor strike depleted their resources. During that war, the Haixing and Yashou were led by the hero Kunlun, who became a close comrade to the Black Robe Envoy, the leader of a faction within the Dixing that sought peace. The war was won by the Haixing with the use of four holy tools crafted from the meteor. At the end of the war, Kunlun vanished, and the Black Robe Envoy became the overseer of peace between the races while awaiting Kunlun's return.

In the present, conflict has begun to erupt again between the Dixing and the surface-dwelling races. The hotheaded Zhao Yunlan leads the Special Investigation Department (SID), a group that works with the Black Robe Envoy to uphold peace and investigate cases related to the Dixing people. While investigating an incident at the local university, Zhao is assisted by Shen Wei, a biological engineering professor. The two men are drawn closer together as a mysterious enemy threatens to re-ignite war.

== Cast ==
=== Main ===
- Bai Yu as Zhao Yunlan / Kunlun

The director and leader of the Special Investigation Department (SID). He is the reincarnation of the ancient war hero Kunlun, the Black Robe Envoy's comrade-in-arms (and, in the original novel, also his lover). He works with Shen Wei to save Haixing from destruction.

- Zhu Yilong as Shen Wei / Black Robe Envoy / Ye Zun

A bio-engineering professor who later joins SID as a consultant. Shen Wei is the civilian identity of the Black Robe Envoy, who seeks to find the four ancient holy tools and keep the peace between the humans and the Dixing. Zhu also portrays Ye Zun, Shen Wei's twin brother and the primary antagonist of the series.

=== Supporting ===
- Xin Peng as Guo Chang Cheng / Xiao Guo

An intern at SID. He is clumsy and cowardly, but kind in nature.

- Li Yan as Da Qing / Black Cat, Fat Cat, Dead Cat.

The deputy director of SID. A Yashou who is able to transform into a cat and former comrade to Kunlun, he became immortal after touching one of the holy tools, but suffers from memory loss and has no memory of Kunlan or the Black Robe Envoy.

- Gao Yu'er as Zhu Hong

A secretary at SID, though she frequently participates in field missions. A Yashou who is able to transform into a snake, she fell in love with Zhao and left her tribe so that she could work with him at SID.

- Wang Naichao as Zhu Jiu

A villainous Dixing leader and underling to Ye Zun, who seeks to establish the domination of the Dixing over the surface-dwelling races.

- Jiang Mingyang as Chu Shuzhi

A field agent at SID who uses psychic marionette strings to fight. A Dixing who was banished after being convicted of murder, he joins SID and later becomes the Black Robe Envoy's spy within the organization.

- Min Tingliu as Lin Jing

SID's resident technical genius, adept in various fields of science. Responsible for forensics and experiments.

- Li Siqi as Wang Zheng / Ge Lan

The human resources manager at SID, although she generally performs secretarial duties. An etheric being (i.e., a ghost) who is the descendant of an ancient tribe.

- Wang Chao Wei as Sang Zan

The archivist at SID. Wang Zheng's lover, and like her, an etheric being. He appears later in the show after being rescued by Wang Zheng. He has difficulties maintaining a physical form, and has trouble speaking and moving.

- Wang Weihua as Zhao Xinchi

Zhao Yunlan's father, and the former director of SID.

- Ju Xiaoyun as Ya Qing

A Yashou who is the elder of the Crow tribe. She initially helps Ye Zun in order to revive her tribe, but later realizes her mistakes and turns to the SID.

- Ma Liang as Ying Chun

A Yashou who is the elder of the Flower tribe.

- Hao Shuang as Sha Ya

A Dixing who possesses electrical powers. She is also Lin Jing's lover.

- Yuan Ye as Mister Yan

Ye Zun's subordinate.

- Wang Yongfeng as Cong Bo

An intelligence agent who offers external assistance to SID.

- Jing Long as Guo Ying

Deputy director of the Investigation Bureau. Guo Changcheng's uncle.

- Dong Fan as Li Qian

A student at Dragon City University. Later becomes a researcher at Haixing Research Institute.

- Zhou Xiaohai as Ouyang Zhen

A professor at Haixing Research Institute.

- Ji Weigang as Lao Li

An employee of SID who makes food for Da Qing.

== Production ==
A web series adaptation of Guardian was announced on March 23, 2017. The series began filming in April 2017 in Shanghai, and wrapped up in July 2017. A media visit was held in June 2017 at the filming set. The opening song, "We Won't Be Falling" was produced by an American team for the drama, with a performance by the Budapest Art Orchestra.

=== Marketing ===
The first trailer was released on January 16, 2018. The second trailer was released on March 26, 2018. On June 11, 2018, a press conference was held with Bai and Zhu in attendance.

== Release ==
The series premiered on June 13, 2018 on the streaming platform Youku, and concluded on July 25, 2018. Members of Youku's paid VIP service were given access to three episodes on Wednesdays and three episodes on Thursdays, while non-members were given access to one episode per day from Monday to Saturday. The series was released in South Korea by Chunghwa TV, and in the United States by Viki.

=== Censorship and re-release ===
On August 2, 2018, Guardian was pulled from Youku for "content adjustments" amid a crackdown by the National Radio and Television Administration on "harmful and vulgar" internet content. The series was re-uploaded to Youku on November 10, 2018 with some scenes re-edited or deleted, receiving over 52 million views in the first seven days of its re-release. Currently it has been removed again and is no longer available in the US.

== Soundtrack ==
No.	Title	Lyrics	Music	Performer(s)	Length
1.	"Just Cared Too Much (只是太在意)" (Ending theme)	Lin Qiao, Ning Hengyu	Ning Hengyu	Ning Hengyu	03:46
2.	"Flight of Time (时间飞行)" (Interlude)	Zhang Ying	Luo Kun	Bai Yu, Zhu Yilong	03:06
3.	"We Won't be Falling" (Opening theme)	Chen Xueran	Chen Xueran	Chen Xueran	03:11
4.	"Initial Heart (初心)" (Opening theme)	Zhang Ying	Chen Xueran	Zhang Hexuan	03:53

== Critical response ==
Guardian has received positive reviews, with People's Daily Online praising the series' "progressive" storyline and "touching" drama, and China Entertainment News praising the story's realism and lack of sensationalism. Conversely, a review for Yangcheng Evening News criticized the series as "unsophisticated."

The term "Guardian girls" (镇魂女孩) was coined to describe female fans of the series. Prior to the series' removal from Youku, fans would discuss the series' homoerotic content on social media under the hashtag "socialist brotherhood" in order to avoid notice from state censors.

== Awards and nominations ==
Year	Award	Category	Nominated work	Result	Ref.
2019	Golden Bud - The Third Network Film And Television Festival	Most Popular Web Series	Guardian	Won	
