= Suddenly This Summer =

2018 Chinese television series

- Starring
- Country of origin: China
- Original language: Mandarin
- No. of episodes: 26

Production
- Production location: China

Original release
- Release: 19 April 2018

Suddenly This Summer
- Simplified Chinese: 忽而今夏
Transcriptions
Standard Mandarin
- Hanyu Pinyin: Xia

Suddenly This Summer (Chinese: 忽而今夏; pinyin: Xia) is a 2018 Chinese youth-themed inspirational television series, adapted from the novel of the same name by Ming Qian Yu Hou, it tells the story of Zhang Yuan and He Luo—a long-distance relationship spanning ten years of their youth—who, despite traversing vast distances and overcoming countless obstacles, never lose sight of their original devotion to one another. This series is co-produced by Penguin Pictures and Perfect World Pictures, directed by Lü Ying, and stars Bai Yu, Bu Guanjin, and others. Filming commenced and, after a 90-day shoot, wrapped on October 23 of the same year.

== Cast ==
- Bai Yu as Zhang Yuan

== Reception ==
=== Ratings ===
China Dragon TV / Jiangsu TV premiere ratings (CSM50)
Episodes	Broadcast date	Dragon TV					
Episodes	Broadcast date	Ratings (%)	Audience share (%)	Rankings	Ratings (%)	Audience share (%)	Rankings

== Awards and nominations ==
Year	Award	Category	Recipient	Result	Ref.

== International broadcast ==
Channel	Location	Broadcast start date	Note
Zhejiang Television	People's Republic of China (the Mainland.)	19 April 2018	

== Production ==
The high school featured in the series was filmed at the branch campus of Qingdao No. 2 High School, located in the Shinan District of Qingdao. Scenes set at Huaqing University were filmed at the Ocean University of China—specifically at its Yushan Campus (covering the sports field, general campus grounds, and cafeteria) and its Laoshan Campus (covering the dormitories and auditorium). Haicheng University was filmed at China University of Petroleum, located in the Huangdao District (West Coast New Area) of Qingdao.

== Awards and nominations ==
- Douban's Top 3 Highest-Rated Titles of 2018
- Best Chinese Web Series of the Year — 2018 China-US TV Festival
- 6th China Internet Audio-Visual Conference: Annual Special Recommendation (Web Series), Annual Special Recommendation (Actress), Annual Outstanding Screenwriter
- The 3rd Golden Guduo Network Film and TV Festival: Top 10 Premium Web Series of the Year
- 12th "Top 10 in TV Production" Outstanding TV Series
- 2019 Shanghai International Film and TV Festival: Internet Excellence List — Outstanding Web Series of the Year
- Nominations for Outstanding TV Series at the 32nd Flying Apsaras Awards (2020)
