= Minning Town (TV series) =

2021 Chinese television series

- Also known as: Love Between Mountains and Seas
- Starring
- Country of origin: China
- Original language: Mandarin
- No. of episodes: 23

Minning Town
- Simplified Chinese: 闽宁镇
Transcriptions

Minning Town (Chinese: 闽宁镇) is a modern rural-themed television series from mainland China, directed by Kong Sheng and Sun Molong, and starring Huang Xuan and Reyizha.Beginning January 12, 2021, the series aired simultaneously on five satellite TV channels (Zhejiang, Beijing, Dragon, Southeast, and Ningxia), as well as on Tencent Video, Youku, and iQIYI. In Taiwan, it was streamed concurrently on LiTV.

== Cast ==
=== Ningxia ===
- Huang Xuan

=== Fujian ===
- Bai Yu as Ding Shijun

== Production ==
Love Between Mountains and Seas is a TV drama series broadcast by the State Administration of Radio and Television to celebrate the 100th Anniversary of the Chinese Communist Party. The original title of the series was Minning Town.

In 2022, an Arabic version of the series was released.

== Awards and nominations ==
=== The 27th Shanghai TV Festival Magnolia Awards ===
- Minning Town for Best Chinese Television Series
- Kong Sheng and Sun Molong for Best Director
- Huang Xuan for Best Male Actor
- Reyizha for Best Actress

=== The 33rd China TV Drama Flying Apsaras Awards ===
- Minning Town for Best Television Series
- Reyizha for Best Actress
- Kong Sheng, Sun Molong for Best Director
- Huang Xuan for Best Male Actor
- Ranked 2nd on the "Top 100 List of Chinese TV Series Satisfaction Survey (2020–2021)" at the 32nd Huading Awards
- 32nd Huading Awards — Top 10 Most Beloved Actors by National Audiences: Reiza (Nominated); Best Supporting Actor in the Top 100 Chinese TV Series: Huang Jue, You Yongzhi (Nominated); Best Supporting Actress in the Top 100 Chinese TV Series: Huang Yao (Nominated); Best Newcomer in the Top 100 Chinese TV Series: Bai Yufan (Nominated); Best Screenplay in the Top 100 Chinese TV Series (Nominated); Best Director in the Top 100 Chinese TV Series (Nominated); Best Original Song in the Top 100 Chinese TV Series (Nominated)
- 2021 Weibo TV Series Awards — Period Drama of the Year (Nominated)
