= Manhunt (2017 film) =

2017 Chinese-Hong Kong film by John Woo

- Theatrical release poster
- Chinese: 追捕
- Directed by: John Woo
- Screenplay by: Gordon Chan; Chan Hing Kai; James Yuen; Itaru Era; Ho Miu Ki; Maria Wong; Sophie Yeh
- Based on: Kimi yo Funnu no Kawa o Watare by Juko Nishimura
- Produced by: Gordon Chan
- Starring: Zhang Hanyu; Masaharu Fukuyama; Qi Wei; Ha Ji-won; Jun Kunimura
- Cinematography: Takuro Ishizaki
- Edited by: Lee Ka Wah
- Music by: Taro Iwashiro
- Production companies: Media Asia; China Film; Media Asia Audio Video Distribution; Shenzhen Murmur Culture Communications
- Release dates: 8 September 2017 (Venice); 23 November 2017 (Hong Kong); 24 November 2017 (China)
- Running time: 106 minutes
- Countries: China; Hong Kong
- Languages: Japanese; English; Mandarin
- Budget: US$50 million
- Box office: US$18.3 million

Manhunt (simplified Chinese: 追捕; traditional Chinese; 追捕; pinyin; Zhuībǔ) is a 2017 action thriller film co-written and directed by John Woo, produced by Gordon Chan, and starring Zhang Hanyu, Masaharu Fukuyama, Qi Wei, Ha Ji-won, and Jun Kunimura. The Chinese-Hong Kong co-production is an adaptation of the Japanese novel Kimi yo Funnu no Kawa o Watare by Juko Nishimura, which was previously adapted in a 1976 film of the same name. Woo decided to develop an adaptation to commemorate the film's star Ken Takakura, who had become a cultural icon in China after the film was the first to be released in China following the Cultural Revolution.

The film was shot on-location in Osaka and Kansai, Japan, and features a mixed Chinese, Japanese, and Korean cast, with dialogue in Mandarin, Japanese, and English. It has been described by Woo as a return to his older style of films, specifically mentioning The Killer. The film premiered at the 74th Venice International Film Festival to be screened out of competition and released in China on 24 November 2017. It was released worldwide on Netflix on 4 May 2018.

== Plot ==
Du Qiu, a Chinese attorney employed by Osaka-based Tenjin Pharmaceuticals, is about to be relocated to the United States after successfully defending the company against numerous high-profile lawsuits. Qiu attends a party where Tenjin President Yoshihiro Sakai appoints his son, Hiroshi, as the new head of research-and-development. Qiu encounters a half-Chinese woman, Mayumi. Sakai tells a mysterious woman to seduce Qiu into remaining in Japan. She dances with him then sneaks to his house before he arrives later.

Qiu awakens to find the woman dead in his bed. He calls the police and when he's taken into custody the arresting officer, Yuji Asano, knocks out another officer and tells Qiu to run. Qiu eludes a police pursuit by fleeing into a partially completed subway station. Veteran detective Satoshi Yamura and his rookie partner Rika find Qiu disguised as an employee in the station. Qiu holds Rika hostage with a nail gun, and Yamura surrenders to save him. Qiu takes Yamura hostage, still proclaiming his innoncence. Yamura overpowers Qui in a fistfight, but gets distracted by white pigeons. Qiu escapes and flees to a nearby shanty town, where he befriends by the Mandarin-literate local Sakaguchi.

Qiu contacts Sakai and demands a face-to-face meeting, suspecting his former employers have set him up. Sakai secretly hires assassins Rain and Dawn to kill Qiu. Sakai's lawyer arrives at the meeting spot and explains that Sakai and Hiroshi have been secretly developing projects for military contractors. Rain aims her sniper rifle at Qiu but is unable to follow through because of Qiu's earlier kindness. She kills the lawyer instead. Yamura pursues Qiu in a high-speed jet ski but Qiu is intercepted on a Shinkansen by Mayumi, who helps him escape to her remote farmhouse. Mayumi explains her fiancé, a scientist employed by Tenjin, was found guilty of stealing their classified formula, and committed suicide on their wedding day after losing the lawsuit initiated by Qiu. Qiu explains he acted on information given by the authorities.

Yamura intervenes when Rain and Dawn ambush the pair on motorcycles, then handcuffs himself to Qiu after their car crashes, in order to take him into custody for the murder. Mayumi tells Yamura she was with Qiu at the time and couldn't have been the murderer. The trio hole up at the farmhouse where they're assaulted by an army of hitmen. Yamura is shot. Dawn is severely injured and injects herself with a stimulant to recover, but overdoses and dies in Rain's arms. Rika drives Yamura and Qiu to a hospital, and they let Qiu go.

Asano blackmailed with his drug addiction, is revealed to be working for Sakai when he demands compensation for his part in framing Qiu as a diversion from the real murderer, Hiroshi. Sakai has Asano killed by Rain. Rika analyzes Asano's drugs, which match the formula Mayumi's fiancé had worked on. Mayumi gives Rika a secret equation necessary for reproducing the drug, a powerful stimulant, before she is captured by Rain.

Sakaguchi and Qiu sneak onto a truck carrying Tenjin test subjects. Sakaguchi is separated from the others at the laboratory and subjected to an excruciating treatment that causes him to become an involuntarily violent, superhuman killer who tries to kill the other subjects. In a moment of clarity he commits suicide. Sakai recognizes Qiu among the others and orders him to receive the same treatment. Yamura arrives and offers Sakai the decoding equation in exchange for Qiu. Rain, realizing that Sakai is ultimately responsible for Dawn's death, releases Mayumi and gives her a gun. Qiu is injected and forced to fight Yamura, but breaks his conditioning. They turn on the guards, and Qiu, Yamura, Mayumi and Rain fight through hordes of guards. Hiroshi injects himself with the updated formula, receives several gunshots and confesses to the murder Qiu was accused of before dying. Sakai shoots Rain and wounds Qiu, and commits suicide when cornered by Qiu and Yamura. Rain dies in Qiu's arms, and Rika arrives with police backup.

Qiu meets Yamura at a train station weeks later. Shaking hands and exchanging names in Japanese and Mandarin, Yamura bids Qiu farewell and boards the train with Mayumi before walking off with Rika.

== Cast ==
- Zhang Hanyu as Du Qiu
- Masaharu Fukuyama as Satoshi Yamura
- Qi Wei as Mayumi Mounami / Zhen Tianmei
- Ha Ji-won as Rain
- Jun Kunimura as Yoshihiro Sakai
- Angeles Woo as Dawn
- Nanami Sakuraba as Rika Hyakuta
- Hiroyuki Ikeuchi as Hiroshi Sakai
- Tao Okamoto as Kiko Tanaka
- Yasuaki Kurata as Hideo Sakaguchi
- Naoto Takenaka as Mamoru Ito
- Kuniharu Tokunaga as Yuji Asano
- Joe Nakamura as Syusuke Aoki
- Takumi Saitoh as Kidnapper A
- Hisashi Yoshizawa as Kidnapper B
- Kei Tanaka as Kitagawa

== Production ==
=== Development ===
After the death of Japanese actor Ken Takakura, Woo searched for material to commemorate him. During this search, he was contacted by Peter Lam, the head of Media Asia, who asked if he would like to do a remake of the 1976 Japanese film Manhunt. Woo's Manhunt is an adaptation of the Japanese novel Kimi yo Fundo no Kawa o Watare by Juko Nishimura, which had previously been adapted into a Japanese film starring Takakura. Woo decided to make a new adaptation of the film, stating that "Ken Takakura is one of my favorite actors in the world. He was my idol, and he has influenced a lot of my films. [Hong Kong actor] Chow Yun-Fat's image in A Better Tomorrow was inspired by Takakura's image and style. I wanted to make a movie dedicated to Ken Takakura." The original film was described by Variety as a "massive hit" when it was released in China in 1978, where it was the first foreign film to be shown in post-Cultural Revolution China.

=== Pre-production ===
Manhunt's producers include Gordon Chan and Chan Hing-kai while the film is being backed by the Hong Kong production company Media Asia on a budget ranging between 30 and 40 million. Manhunt marked the end of Woo's previous production company Lion Rock Films following the box-office disappointment of The Crossing which led to Woo and Terence Chang disbanding Lion Rock Productions.

Woo stated that he had "got tired of making big-budget movies. I think about going back to the old times, when it wasn't so much about money but about working with a wonderful, smaller crew to make a real movie." Woo expanded on this later stating that there was great pressure in enjoying the creative process when "being controlled by the numbers during the entire process" or deciding "decide how to shoot a scene because of the budget, not inspiration."

The production team includes Japanese art director Yohei Taneda and cinematographer Takuro Ishizaka. The film features a large Japanese cast including Yasuaki Kurata, Jun Kunimura, Hiroyuki Ikeuchi, Nanami Sakuraba, Naoto Takenaka and Tao Okamoto. In addition, Chinese actress Qi Wei and Korean actress Ha Ji-won were cast in key roles in the film.

=== Filming ===
Production started on Manhunt in June 2016 in Osaka. At the beginning of the production, the cast and crew and local government officials held a traditional Japanese kagami biraki ceremony. Woo stated that Manhunt would go back to his older style of filmmaking, referring to his film The Killer specifically.

Manhunt was projected to finished filming in October 2016 and then later reported to be finished filming by the end of November. The China Internet Information Center stated that the film had begun post-production in January 2017.

== Release ==
Manhunt was scheduled to have its world premiere at the 74th Venice International Film Festival. The film was shown out of competition. It had press and industry screenings 6 September 2017 and a public screening on 8 September 2017. Both Woo and actress Ha Ji-won were scheduled to attended the festival in Venice.

The film received its North American premiere at the 2017 Toronto International Film Festival as part of their special presentation program. Manhunt had its first press screening in Toronto on 7 September 2017 and was scheduled for a public screening 14 September 2017.

The film was initially set for release in China on 16 February 2018. The China Internet Information Center described that waiting this long for a release is "unusual for a Chinese film". The film was released in China on 24 November 2017.

== Soundtrack ==
映画「マンハント」オリジナル・サウンドトラック

Soundtrack album by Taro Iwashiro
- Released: 21 February 2018
- Genre: Soundtrack
- Label: Nippon Columbia

映画「マンハント」オリジナル・サウンドトラック was released by Nippon Columbia on February 21, 2018.

=== Track listing ===
1. "Nightfall's Coming Over"
2. "At Urban Blind Spot"
3. "Dogma Lines"
4. "An Unknown Daybreak"
5. "Hunt on the River"
6. "Secret Hunting"
7. "Buddy Session"
8. "Dogma Circles"
9. "J's Autumn Festival"
10. "Against the Investigation"
11. "Introduction to Party"
12. "Unpredictable Lonely Figure"
13. "Interval of the Inference"
14. "Keep on Seeking More"
15. "Soldiers Dance"
16. "Madness and Science"
17. "Rule of the Assassins Duo"
18. "Memories of the Illusion"
19. "Dogma Links"
20. "Before Attacking at Farm"
21. "Run and Run"
22. "Way to the Horizon"
23. "Place at the End"
24. "Destiny and Bond"
25. "For Two Men"
26. "忘れじの女/Unforgettable Woman"

== Reception ==
=== Box office ===
Manhunt has grossed a worldwide total of $18.3 million, against a production budget of $50 million.

=== Critical response ===
On review aggregator website Rotten Tomatoes, the film holds an approval rating of 67% based on 27 reviews, and an average rating of 6.2/10. On Metacritic, the film was given an average score of 68 out of 100, based on 14 critics, indicating "generally favorable reviews".

Screen Daily declared the film "a breezy, handsomely mounted fun that shows that Woo has lost neither his mojo nor his sense of poetry." and "Manhunt is a John Woo movie like he used to make ‘em, before his US period including Face/Off and Mission: Impossible 2, and recent Asian historical diptychs Red Cliff and The Crossing." Variety described Manhunt as "underwhelming and undercooked" and that the audience who come to Woo for the action scenes would be satisfied while "those of us for whom the director's best work, like the brilliant Hard Boiled or the transcendently ludicrous Face/Off, is marked out not just by superior gun-fu but by the disarming sincerity with which he always sold the silliness, Manhunt is a disappointment." The Hollywood Reporter referred to the film as a "string of sophisticated and thrilling set pieces." and that "Production values are lavish and some of the metallic sets designed by Yohei Taneda have the complexity of an Escher puzzle. Takuro Ishizaka’s lighting gives even the silly final scenes a visually exciting veneer." The review also commented on the story referring to it as "logic-free" and concluded that the film "isn’t going to go down in history as [Woo's] best film" Peter Bradshaw of The Guardian gave the film four stars out of five, stating that praised the films action sequences as a highlight while stating that the story is a "little absurd" but that the film "offers something that is never in sufficiently plentiful supply: fun."
