= Fairyland Lovers =

2020 Chinese television series

- Starring
- Country of origin: China
- Original language: Mandarin

Fairyland Lovers
- Simplified Chinese: 蓬萊間
Transcriptions

Fairyland Lovers (Chinese: 蓬萊間) is a 2020 Chinese web series adapted by Lu Han—a writer at "Jiangnan Studio"—from his eponymous novel, which was serialized on Longwen in 2014 and published in 2015. It stars Bai Yu, Zheng Qiuhong, Ji Xiaobing, Chen Yihan, Li Mingde, and others. Co-produced by Penguin Pictures and Linglong Culture, and directed by Wang Yiding, the production spanned three months and wrapped on June 14, 2019. This series tells the story of Bai Qi (played by Bai Yu)—a "spirit doctor" whose origins and identity remain shrouded in mystery—as he traverses the mortal realm. While helping various "spiritual entities" resolve their deep-seated obsessions, he crosses paths with his landlady, Lin Xia (played by Zheng Qiuhong), and through this encounter, uncovers a mysterious history spanning a thousand years. Structured as an episodic anthology, it is a heartwarming and healing fantasy romance drama.

== Plot synopsis ==
=== Differences from the original novel ===
In this adaptation, the "demonic creatures" of the original novel's setting have been renamed "Spiritual Beings," and the inhabitants of the Immortal Realm have been reclassified as the "Penglai Clan." Consequently, the narrative—originally a fantasy tale involving reincarnation, the Immortal Realm, and demons—has been reimagined as a science fiction story involving extraterrestrials. Furthermore, the "Way of Heaven" (Tian Dao) from the original text—a mysterious entity that repeatedly dispatched agents to hunt down Lin Xia—has been redefined. Bai Qi, originally tasked with overseeing reincarnation on behalf of the Way of Heaven, fell in love with Lin Xia while under orders to hunt her down. Subsequently, he resolved to construct the "Ark of Penglai" by healing Spiritual Beings and collecting the resulting fragments, with the ultimate goal of reaching a "Land of Freedom"—for only there could the two of them truly be together.

=== The adapted narrative ===
Beyond the Milky Way lies a mysterious planet inhabited by the "Penglai Clan," a race endowed with the power of eternal youth and immortality. A thousand years ago, an "Ark of Penglai" crashed onto Earth while traversing the galaxy. The fragments of the Ark shattered into countless jade stones, scattering across the globe. If a human possessed by a deep obsession were to discover or acquire one of these jade stones—which are imbued with the "Power of Penglai"—they would be transformed into a "Spiritual Being." To reclaim this Power of Penglai, the survivors of the Ark often sought to eliminate these Spiritual Beings, earning themselves the moniker "Heavenly Soldiers." A millennium later, Bai Qi (played by Bai Yu)—the world's sole physician for Spiritual Beings—utilizes a sanctuary known as "Taoyuanxiang" to help these beings resolve their obsessions, accepting their most cherished possessions as payment. A man of mysterious identity and origins, he crosses paths with Lin Xia (played by Zheng Qiuhong), the landlady of No. 18 Yanyu Hutong. Living under the same roof, the two work together to help one Spiritual Being after another resolve their obsessions, and in the process, romantic feelings begin to blossom between them. Amidst these events, details regarding Bai Qi's past—a history spanning a thousand years—gradually begin to surface.

== Cast ==
- Bai Yu as Bai Qi
