= Embrace Again =

- Theatrical release poster
- Traditional Chinese: 穿過寒冬擁抱你
- Simplified Chinese: 穿过寒冬拥抱你
- Literal meaning: Embrace you through the cold winter
- Hanyu Pinyin: Chuānguò Hándōng Yōngbào Nǐ
- Directed by: Xue Xiaolu
- Written by: Xue Xiaolu; Liu Qing; Zhang Bolei; Hao Zhe; Wang Yue
- Produced by: Li Hao
- Starring: Huang Bo; Jia Ling
- Production companies: China Film Co., Ltd. Alibaba Pictures; Changjiang Huasheng Media
- Release date: 31 December 2021 (China)
- Running time: 125 minutes
- Country: China
- Languages: Standard Chinese; Wuhan dialect
- Box office: $147.3 million

Embrace Again is a 2021 Chinese romance film directed by Xue Xiaolu and starring Huang Bo and Jia Ling. The film was released in mainland China on 31 December 2021 and depicts love stories between ordinary people during the COVID-19 lockdown in Wuhan, Hubei.

== Plot ==
The film features four parallel storylines and is based on true stories about people in Wuhan during the lockdown early in the COVID-19 pandemic. It is lighter in tone than Chinese Doctors, another 2021 film set during the Wuhan lockdown.

One storyline, starring Huang Bo, follows a courier who works to transport goods for hospitals. Another, starring Jia Ling and Zhu Yilong, depicts the interactions between a delivery person and a piano teacher. The third storyline is about an elderly couple, a restaurateur (played by Hui Shiu-hung) and a retired doctor (played by Wu Yanshu). The fourth is about a middle-aged couple, two businesspeople who run a travel agency and a supermarket, played by Xu Fan and Gao Yalin.

== Cast ==
Name	Role	Description
Huang Bo	Ayong	a courier
Jia Ling	Wu Ge	a takeout delivery person
Zhu Yilong	Ye Ziyang	a piano teacher
Xu Fan	Liu Yalan	
Gao Yalin	Li Hongyu	
Wu Yanshu	Xie Yongqin	
Hui Shiu-hung	Pei Ye	
Zhou Dongyu	Xia Xiao	
Liu Haoran	Zhang Zhe	
Qiao Xin	Junjun	
Wang Yinan		
Wang Xiao		
Tian Xiaojie		
Sun Xi		
Liu Tianzuo		
Shang Yuxian		
Zhang Youhao		

== Production ==
The film was directed by Xue Xiaolu. In the early stages of production, Xue interviewed a variety of people who had helped with the epidemic response and gathered their stories as source material for the film. Xue had Jia Ling and Zhu Yilong in mind for their parts when writing the script.

Xu Fan and Zhu Yilong are from Wuhan, and Jia Ling is also from Hubei. Jia said "As someone from Hubei, I'm honored to be in the movie." Although she was not in Hubei during the outbreak, she had friends who were in the province at the time, and filming the movie brought back memories for her.

Two versions of the film were released, one in Standard Mandarin and one in the Wuhan dialect. Wuhan native Zhu Yilong taught the dialect to Jia Ling and Huang Bo for the film. Huang Bo said at a press event that he worked hard to learn the dialect so that his accent wouldn't ruin the audience's suspension of disbelief. Jia Ling is from Xiangyang, where the local dialect is more similar to Henan dialect, but she said that she was familiar with Wuhan dialect from going to school in the city.

== Release ==
Embrace Again had its premiere on 24 December 2021. It was released in mainland China on Friday, 31 December 2021. It was the highest-performing film in the Chinese box office upon its release, grossing more than 270 million RMB on its first day. On 3 January 2022, the film's box office total surpassed 570 million RMB. A week after its release, it remained the top-performing film in theaters in mainland China.

It was released in Australia and New Zealand on 6 January 2022 and in the United States on 7 January 2022.

One of the film's taglines was "Warmly step into the new year" (温暖跨年).

== Reception ==
As of 28 December 2021, Embrace Again had high ratings from advance screening viewers: 9.6 on Taopiaopiao and 9.5 on Maoyan.

The film has received positive reviews from critics. Rao Shuguang, president of the China Film Critics Association, described the film as romantic and warm and said the characters were believable and likeable. Zhang Jinfeng of China Film News said that it was "written with warmth and artistic depth" and called it "a work that depicts a new age, a new journey, and a new hope". Giving the film 3.5 out of 5 stars, Richard Gray of The Reel Bits called it "a vehicle for national pride and feel-good spirit" but praised its attention to individual characters and its theme of body positivity.

Critics praised the film's depiction of women, saying the female characters were authentic, brave, and healthy. Li Chunli of Guangming Daily said that as a woman, the film's director Xue Xiaolu "quietly gives voice to women; she is expressing women's tastes and depicting women's dignity."
