= Priest (writer) =

Chinese author

- Occupation: Author
- Writing career
- Period: 2007–present
- Genres: Crime fiction; Danmei; fantasy; historical; romance; Sci-fi; steampunk; wuxia; xianxia

Priest is a pseudonymous Chinese author whose works are published online. Signed by the web-based publisher Jinjiang Literature City, she has been actively writing since 2007 and has received several awards for her writing. She is considered to be among the top five Chinese writers catering to women's interests.

Priest is known for writing in a variety of genres, and her works include both danmei novels and novels featuring female protagonists. Her works have been adapted into manhua, donghua, and television dramas. Many of her novels have been translated into Korean, Thai, Vietnamese, Traditional Chinese, Japanese, and English. The dramas Guardian, Legend of Fei, Word of Honor, and Justice in the Dark are based on Priest's novels.

== Life ==
Priest works full-time, writing on the side. She has a cat named Pizai (皮仔). In 2019, she ranked seventeenth on a list of Chinese authors by income.

== Style and themes ==
Priest's works have deep humanistic themes, reflecting reality and women's growth. The Biennial Network Literature Award stated that her novel You Fei "gives full play to the author's ability to control the grand historical theme, vertically continues the classic context of the wuxia novel genre, horizontally connects with the female Internet text, and opens up new possibilities in the old type tradition. The novel has a grand structure, steady rhythm, concise language, delicate and touching characters, and delicate emotions. It is a rare masterpiece of contemporary network wuxia novels." You Fei was also praised by Sixth Tone as a unique martial arts piece that focuses on a woman in a usually male-centered genre.

Tan Tian of Literature and Art Newspaper says that Priest's Mo Du demonstrates an: "…inheritance of traditional literary resources, which is mainly manifested in three aspects: titles, selected sentences, and contents are integrated into the elements of traditional literary resources; realistic style is concerned about social hot issues; the slow introduction of narrative rhythm and complex story structure suggest that network literature extradite the essence of traditional literature."

About Priest's Can Ci Pin, the 30th China Science Fiction Galaxy Awards stated, "Under the surface of all kinds of sci-fi elements such as mechs, cyber, and interstellar wars, there lies a story about the warmth of humanity. The author uses a first-class narrative ability, bringing sci-fi to a much wider audience."

== Works ==
Priest has published six short stories and more than thirty novels. Several of her novels have been licensed for English translation by Seven Seas Entertainment and Rosmei. Her work has also been published in Japan by Pleiades Press, in Korea by Ridibooks, and in Russia, Taiwan, Thailand, and Vietnam.

=== Adaptations ===
Several of Priest's novels have been adapted into comics (manhua), animated series (donghua), or live-action television dramas. These include:

- Tian Ya Ke (天涯客, 2010) - Adapted into web series Word of Honor.
- Zi Ben Jian Ke (资本剑客, 2012) - Licensed for adaptation into television series of the same name.
- Zhen Hun (镇魂, 2012) - Adapted into web series Guardian.
- Shan He Biao Li (山河表里, 2014) - Adapted into web series of the same name.
- Tuo Gui (脱轨, 2014) - Adapted into web series Derailment.
- Sha Po Lang (杀破狼, 2015) - Adapted into web series of the same name.
- You Fei (有匪, 2015) - Adapted into television series Legend of Fei.
- Mo Du (默读, 2016) - Adapted into web series Justice in the Dark.
- Can Ci Pin (残次品, 2017) - Adapted into animated series The Defective.
- Lie Huo Jiao Chou (烈火浇愁, 2019) - Adapted into animated series of the same name.

== Awards and honors ==
=== Literary Distinctions ===
- Finalist, Newman Prize for Chinese Literature 2027 (final results to be announced in early 2027)

=== Online Literature Awards / Recognitions ===
- One of the five classic writers selected for 20 Years of Chinese Network Literature
- 4th Orange Melon Network Literature Award
- 2020 Orange Melon Network Literature: Top Ten Wuxia Authors in the Past 20 Years
- 2020 Orange Melon Network Literature: Top 100 Great God Authors in 20 Years of Network Literature
- 2020 Orange Melon Network Literature: Top 100 Industry Representatives of Network Literature in the Past 20 Years

==== You Fei ====
- 2nd Network Literature Biennial Award – Bronze Award
- 2016 Novel Reading List – Novel of the Year award, Best Ancient Saying of the Year, Best Plot of the Year, Author of the Year
- 2017 Weibo Reading – Top Ten Asian books
- 2017 Novel Reading List – Most Anticipated Screen Adaptation, Most Popular Ancient Chinese Work
- 2016 Douban Annual Reading List – Top 1 Fantasy Genre
- 2017 Douban Annual Reading List – Top 1 Fantasy Genre
- 2016-2017 Network Committee of China Literary Critics Association, Guangming Literary Criticism Editorial Office, China Youth Publishing House – Top 10 of Recommended Chinese Online Novels List
- Online Literature Masterpiece with the Most Copyright Value in 2020 (Historical Genre)

==== Zhen Hun ====
- China's IP Industry Report 2016 – China's Super IP-Top 100 Influence List

==== Mo Du ====
- 2018 Douban Annual Reading List – Top 1 Suspense/Mystery Genre
- 2018 4th Chinese Original Fiction Awards – Most Popular Work

==== Can Ci Pin ====
- 2019 30th Chinese Science Fiction Galaxy Awards – Best Original Book (published by Jiangsu Phoenix Literature and Art Publishing House)
- 2019 Top Ten Best Searchlight Chinese Literature Books of 2019

=== Network Literature Authors List ===
- No.5 in the Top 50 Influence Ranking of Chinese Women Writers of Network Literature in 2020
- No.8 in the Top 50 Influence Ranking of Chinese Women Writers of Network Literature in 2019
- No.11 in the Top 50 Influence Ranking of Chinese Women Writers of Network Literature in 2018
- No. 23 in the Top 50 Influence Ranking of Chinese Women Writers of Network Literature in 2017
- No.5 in the 5th Network Literature Authors List of Influential Dangdang Authors

=== Jinjiang Literature City Awards/Recognitions ===
- 2010 – Qi Ye won outstanding BL (Boys Love) works
- 2011 – Tian Ya Ke won outstanding BL (Boys Love) works
- 2012 – Zhen Hun won outstanding BL (Boys Love) works
- 2013 – Da Ying Xiong Shi Dai won outstanding modern romance
- 2013 – Da Ge won outstanding BL (Boys Love) works
- 2014 – Shan He Biao Li won outstanding BL (Boys Love) works
- 2015 – Sha Po Lang won outstanding BL (Boys Love) works
- 2016 – Most Valuable Author of IP adaptation
- 2016 – You Fei won excellent historical romance works
- 2016 – Mo Du won outstanding BL (Boys Love) works
- 2017 – Most Valuable Author of IP adaptation
- 2017 – Most Popular Author
- 2017 – Can Ci Pin won the Year's Danmei Masterpiece
- 2018 – Most Influential Author of IP adaptation
- 2018 – Most Popular Author
- 2018 – Wu Wu Ran, Wu Gong Hai was a top ten work of modern romance for the year
- 2019 – Most Influential Author of IP adaptation
- 2019 – Most Popular Author
- 2019 – Lie Huo Jiao Chou won the Year's Danmei Masterpiece
- 2021 - Tai Sui won a Year-end Masterpiece medal
