= Changchun Film Festival =

Film festival in Changchun, China

- Location: Changchun
- Founded: 1992; 34 years ago
- Awards: Golden Deer Awards
- Language: Chinese
- Website: www.chinaccff.com

The Changchun Film Festival (中国长春电影节) is a biennial international film festival held in the Chinese city of Changchun. Ostensibly international, its award for best film, the Golden Deer has nevertheless primarily been awarded to Chinese and other East Asia-region films. It was first held in 1992 and was founded in part by the Changchun Film Studio (now the Changchun Film Studio Group Corporation).

The festival is funded in part by the Ministry of Radio, Cinema, and Television, the provincial government of Jilin, and the Changchun municipal government.

== Golden Deer Award (Best Film) ==
Films awarded the Golden Deer for Best Film
Year	Winner	Director	Country of origin	Ref.
1992	The Story of Qiu Ju	Zhang Yimou	Mainland China	
1994	Chongqing Negotiations	Li Qiankuan; Xiao Guiyun	Mainland China	
1996	Good Men, Good Women	Hou Hsiao-hsien	Taiwan	
1998	Genghis Khan	Fu Sai; Mai Lisi	Hong Kong	
2000	Roaring Across the Horizon	Chen Guoxing	Mainland China	
2002	Heavenly Grassland	Fu Sai; Mai Lisi	Mainland China	
2006	On the Mountain of Tai Hang	Chen Jian; Shen Dong; Wei Lian	Mainland China	
2010	The Founding of a Republic	Han Sanping; Huang Jianxin; Chen Kaige	Mainland China	
2012	1911	Jackie Chan; Zhang Li	Mainland China	
2014	American Dreams in China	Peter Chan	Mainland China	
2016	Xuanzang	Huo Jianqi	Mainland China	
2018	Operation Red Sea	Dante Lam	Mainland China	
2018	Dying to Survive	Wen Muye	Mainland China	
2020	My People, My Country	Chen Kaige; Zhang Yibai; Guan Hu; Xue Xiaolu; Xu Zheng; Ning Hao; Wen Muye	Mainland China	
2021	The Battle at Lake Changjin	Chen Kaige; Tsui Hark; Dante Lam	Mainland China	
2022	The Battle at Lake Changjin II	Chen Kaige; Tsui Hark; Dante Lam	Mainland China	
2023	The Wandering Earth 2	Frant Gwo	Mainland China	

== Best Director ==
Year	Winner	Film	Country of origin
1996	Hou Hsiao-hsien	Good Men, Good Women	Taiwan
1998	Mai Lisi, Fu Sai	Genghis Khan	Mainland China
2000	Chen Guoxing	Roaring Across the Horizon	Mainland China
2002	Ma Liwen	She Departs from Me	Mainland China
2004	Johnnie To	Breaking News	Hong Kong
2006	Peter Chan	Perhaps Love	Hong Kong
2008	Xu Geng	Heart of Ice	Mainland China
2010	Haisi Chaolu	Ripples in Faith	Mainland China
2012	Johnnie To	Life Without Principle	Hong Kong
2014	Peter Chan	American Dreams in China	Mainland China
2016	Derek Yee	I Am Somebody	Mainland China
2018	Dong Yue	The Looming Storm	Mainland China
2020	Lina Yang Tian-yi	Spring Tide	Mainland China
2021	Yin Ruoxi	Sister	Mainland China
2022	Xue Xiaolu	Embrace Again	Mainland China
2023	Rao Xiaozhi	Home Coming	Mainland China

== Best Screenplay ==
Year	Winner	Film	Country of origin
1994	Zhong Xiaotian	Chongqing Negotiations	Mainland China
1996	Su Xiaowei	Ying Jia	Mainland China
1998	Xian Ziliang, Xiong You	Tao Yuan Zhen	Mainland China
2000	Huang Dan, Tang Louyi, Ann Hu	Shadow Magic	Mainland China
2002	Han Zhijun	Mei Li De Bai Yin Na	Mainland China
2010	Su Xiaowei	Six Sisters in the War	Mainland China
2012	Xing Aina, He Ruirui, Zheng Xiaoyang, Yue Xiaojun, Wang Hongwei, Ruan Shisheng	Guns and Roses	Mainland China
2014	Diao Yinan	Black Coal, Thin Ice	Mainland China
2016	Peng Sanyuan	Lost and Love	Mainland China
2018	Han Jianü, Zhong Wei, Wen Muye	Dying to Survive	Mainland China
2020	Liu Lu, Shen Zhou	Almost a Comedy	Mainland China
2021	Yu Xi, Zhao Ningyu, Huang Xin	1921	Mainland China
2022	Zhou Chucen, Wen Muye, Han Xiaohan, Zhong Wei, Xiu Mengdi	Nice View	Mainland China
2023	Wang Baoqiang, Qi Qi	Never Say Never	Mainland China

== Best Actress ==
Year	Winner	Film	Country of origin
1994	Pan Hong	Gu Feng	Mainland China
1996	Jacklyn Wu	The Phantom Lover	Taiwan
1998	Ai Liya	Genghis Khan	Mainland China
2000	Tang Na	The Last Deer Hunter	Mainland China
2002	Anita Mui	July Rhapsody	Hong Kong
2005	Tian Hairong	Pretty Girl	Mainland China
2006	Zhao Wei	A Time to Love	Mainland China
2008	Ma Yili	Good Jiangbeier	Mainland China
2010	Zhao Wei	Mulan	Mainland China
2010	Kara Hui	At the End of Daybreak	Hong Kong
2012	Ni Ping	The Great Sun	Mainland China
2014	Gong Li	Coming Home	Mainland China
2016	Bai Baihe	Monster Hunt	Mainland China
2018	Zhang Ziyi	The Wasted Times	Mainland China
2020	Ren Suxi	Almost a Comedy	Mainland China
2021	Zhang Zifeng	Sister	Mainland China
2022	Ma Li	Too Cool to Kill	Mainland China
2023	Ni Ni	Lost in the Stars	Mainland China
2024	Li Gengxi	Viva La Vida	Mainland China
2025	Diana Lin	Big World	Mainland China
2026	Li Sitong	Dear You	Mainland China

== Best Actor ==
Year	Winner	Film	Country of origin
1994	Wang Xueqi	Dai Gui Lu De Yao Lan	Mainland China
1996	Gao Ming	Kong Fansen	Mainland China
1998	Ju Hao	Re Shi Sheng Fei	Mainland China
2000	Li Youbin	Heng Kong Chu Shi	Mainland China
2002	Hou Yong	Sheng Zhen Chang Kong	Mainland China
2004	Leon Lai	Leaving Me, Loving You	Hong Kong
2006	Aaron Kwok	Divergence	Hong Kong
2008	Ren Chengwei	Freez Breaking	Mainland China
2010	Nick Cheung	Beast Stalker	Hong Kong
2010	Wang Xueqi	Bodyguards and Assassins	Mainland China
2012	Lei Jiayin	Guns and Roses	Mainland China
2014	Huang Xiaoming	American Dreams in China	Mainland China
2016	Huang Xiaoming	Xuanzang	Mainland China
2018	Xu Zheng	Dying to Survive	Mainland China
2020	Hailaiti Hamu	Fade Away Pastoral	Mainland China
2021	Liu Ye	Island Keeper	Mainland China
2022	Zhu Yilong	Embrace Again	Mainland China
2023	Jackson Yee	Full River Red	Mainland China
2024	Peng Yuchang	Viva La Vida	Mainland China
2025	Liu Haoran	Decoded	Mainland China
2026	Jiang Qiming	Take Off	Mainland China
2026	Tan Jianci	Sound of Silence	Mainland China

== Best Supporting Actress ==
Year	Winner	Film	Country of origin
2000	Chen Jin	Roaring Across the Horizon	Mainland China
2002	Huang Suying	Gone Is the One Who Held Me Dearest in the World	Mainland China
2006	Song Xiaoying	A Time to Love	Mainland China
2008	Tang Jiasi	The Ring of Rainbow Flower	Mainland China
2010	Sandra Ng	Echoes of the Rainbow	Hong Kong
2012	Chiao Chiao	Overheard 2	Hong Kong
2014	Suolang Zhuogua	Phurbu & Tenzin	Mainland China
2016	Wang Luodan	The Dead End	Mainland China
2018	Jiang Luxia	Operation Red Sea	Mainland China

== Best Supporting Actor ==
Year	Winner	Film	Country of origin
2000	Jiang Wu	Shower	Mainland China
2002	Anthony Wong Chau-Sang	Princess D	Hong Kong
2006	Eric Tsang	2 Young	Hong Kong
2008	Liu Xiaofeng	Penicillin 1944	Mainland China
2010	Sun Haiying	Examination 1977	Mainland China
2012	Guo Tao	Guns and Roses	Mainland China
2014	Tong Dawei	American Dreams in China	Mainland China
2016	Jing Boran	Lost and Love	Mainland China
2018	Eric Wang	Dying to Survive	Mainland China

== See also ==
- List of film festivals in China
