= Jackson Yee discography =

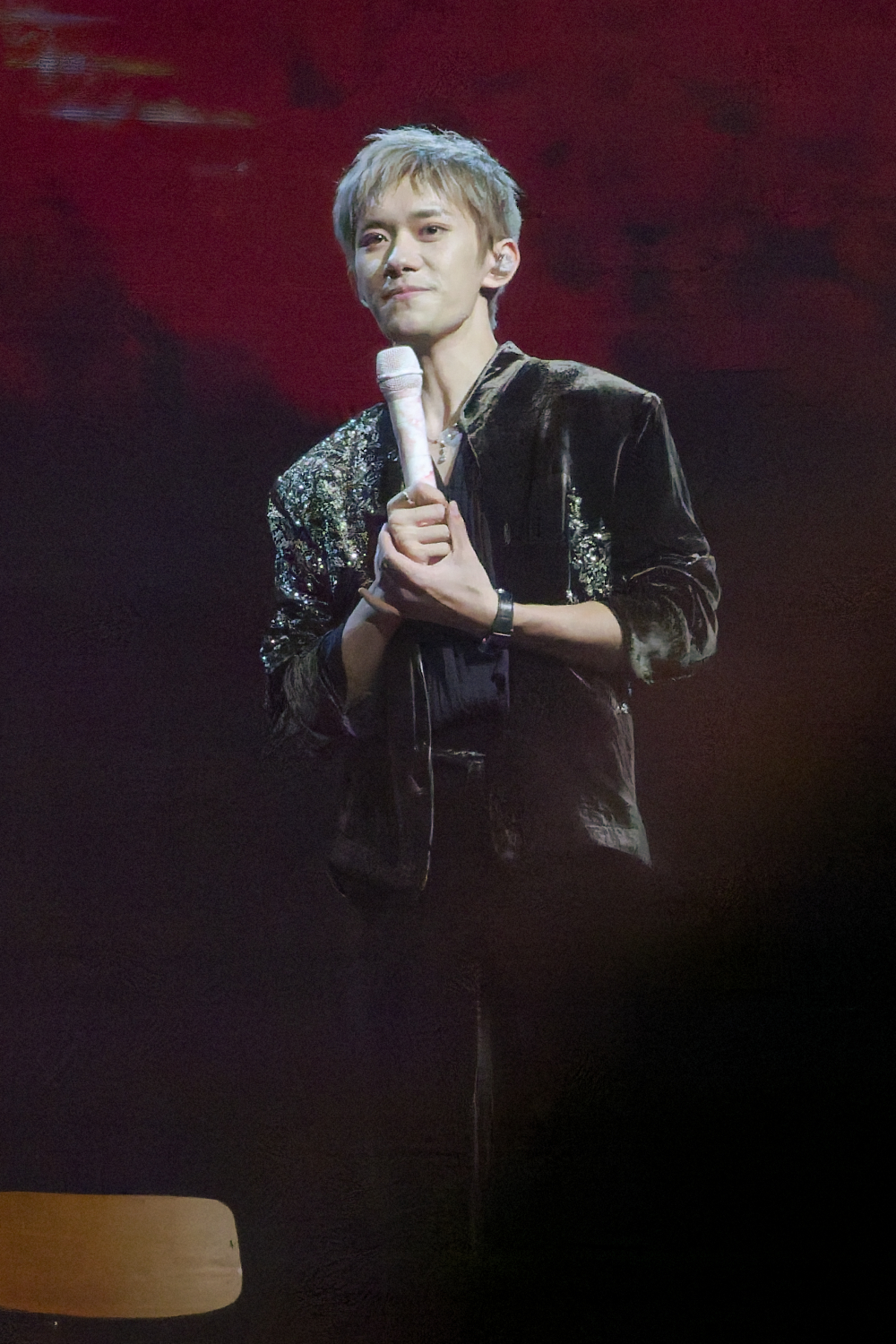
- Yee in 2025
- Studio albums: 3
- EPs: 1
- Live albums: 4

This is the discography of Chinese recording artist Jackson Yee. He debuted as a member of Chinese boy group TFBoys in 2013, and released his first solo extended play, Firing in Nothingness, in 2018. Yee has released three studio albums, including Temperature Curve (2019), Back Seat Theater (2020), and Liu Yanfen (2023).

== Studio albums ==
Title	Details
Temperature Curve (温差感)	Released: 20 December 2019; Label: Time Fengjun Entertainment; Formats: Digital download, streaming; Track listing: 1. "入梦" (Intro); 2. "末日长河" (The Last River); 3. "牺牲的一半" (Keep Colorful); 4. "再一, 再二, 再三" (Again and Again); 5. "两个傍晚的月亮" (Moon); 6. "Gone"; 7. "酣然" (Interdule); 8. "冷静和热情之间" (Between Dreams); 9. "Fall"; 10. "I Adore You"; 11. "陷落美好" (Free Falling); 12. "念想" (Better Us) (Piano Version); 13. "初醒" (Outro)
Back Seat Theater (后座剧场)	Released: 27 November 2020; Label: Time Fengjun Entertainment; Formats: Digital download, streaming; Track listing: 1. 39km 2. "野花" (Wildflowers); 3. 38.7km 4. "爱情鸟" (Lovebird); 5. 35km 6. "亲密爱人" (Sweetheart); 7. 4km 8. "孤独的人是可耻的" (Shameful Being Left Alone); 9. 0.5km 10. "爱的箴言" (The Proverbs of Love); 11. 0.01km 12. "送别" (Farewell)
Liu Yanfen (刘艳芬)	Released: 25 April 2023; Label: Tencent Music Entertainment; Formats: CD, digital download, streaming; Track listing: 1. 20:55; 2. "九里庄人才中心" (Jiulizhuang Talent Center); 3. 21:00; 4. "你好，我是____" (Hello, I am ____); 5. "冷屁股" (Cold Shoulder); 6. "霓裳" (Nichang); 7. 22:12; 8. "五光十色" (Technicolor); 9. 22:28; 10. "彳亍" (Walk Slowly); 11. 22:33; 12. "白日猫" (Cat in the Daytime); 13. "她等在午夜前" (She Waited Till Midnight); 14. "23:00"; 15. "同乘" (Sharing a Ride)

== Extended plays ==
Title	Details
Firing in Nothingness (我乐意沉默释放内心烟火)	Released: 28 November 2018; Label: Time Fengjun Entertainment; Formats: Digital download, streaming; Track Listing: 1. "Don't Tie Me Down"; 2. "亲爱的，这里没有一个人" (Colorful Human); 3. "灾" (Overrun); 4. "恒温动物" (Warm Blooded); 5. "舒适圈" (Unique Zone); 6. "Nothing to Lose" (Unplugged); 7. "Don't Tie Me Down" (Instrumental); 8. "亲爱的，这里没有一个人" (Colorful Human) (Instrumental); 9. "灾" (Overrun) (Instrumental); 10. "恒温动物" (Warm Blooded) (Instrumental); 11. "舒适圈" (Unique Zone) (Instrumental)
Keystone (楔石)	Released: 9 June 2025; Label: Tencent Music Entertainment; Formats: Digital download, streaming; Track Listing: 1. "楔木" (Wooden Wedge); 2. "逢石" (Fengshi); 3. "山花" (Mountain Flowers); 4. "步语" (Walking Thoughts)

== Live albums ==
Title	Details
Jackson Yee "Yi's" Adult Ceremony Live Audio (易烊千玺"燚's"成人礼live音频)	Released: 19 December 2018; Label: Time Fengjun Entertainment; Formats: Digital download, streaming; Track listing: 1. "念旧 (Live)" (Nostalgia (Live)); 2. "需要人陪 (Live)" (Need Some Company (Live)); 3. "好久不见 + 南部小城 + 红豆 (Live)" (Long Time No See + Southern Small Town + Red Beans (Live)); 4. "Nothing to Lose (Unplugged|Live)"; 5. "舒适圈 (Live)" (Unique Zone (Live)); 6. "恒温动物 (Live)" (Warm Blooded)); 7. "亲爱的，这里没有一个人 (Live)" (Colorful Human (Live)); 8. "Don't Tie Me Down (Live)"
Jackson Yee 2019 "Su Er" Concert Live Album (易烊千玺2019“玊尔"演唱会live辑)	Released: 13 January 2020; Label: Time Fengjun Entertainment; Formats: Digital download, streaming; Number of tracks: 22; Disc 1 track listing: 1. "Don't Tie Me Down (Live)"; 2. "无地自容 (Live)" (Shameful (Live)); 3. “亲爱的，这里没有一个人 (Live)" (Colorful Human)); 4. "灾 (Live)" (Overrun (Live)); 5. "被驯服的象 (Live)" (Tamed Elephant (Live)); Disc 2 track listing: 1. "冷静与热情之间 (Live)” (Between Dreams (Live)); 2. "恒温动物 (Live)" (Warm Blooded (Live)); 3. "I Adore You (Live)"; 4. "再回首 (Live)“ (A Song of Memory (Live)); 5. "Fall (Live)"; 6. "两个傍晚的月亮 (Live)" (Moon (Live)); Disc 3 track listing: 1. "再一，再二，再三 (Live)" (Again and Again (Live)); 2. "Can You Feel My World (Live)"; Disc 4 track listing: 1. "奉献 (Live)" (Devotion (Live)); 2. "Unpredictable (Live)"; 3. "Nothing to Lose (Live)"; 4. "你曾是少年 (Live)" (Wings of My Words (Live)); 5. "找到你是我最伟大的成功 (Live)" (Finding You is My Greatest Success (Live)); Disc 5 track listing: 1. "每个眼神都只身荒野 (Live)" (Twist the Wildfire (Live)); 2. "小城大爱 (Live)" (Big City Small Love (Live)); 3. "舒适圈 (Live)" (Unique Zone (Live))
Guotang (Live) (过塘 (Live))	Released: 25 January 2025; Label: Tencent Music Entertainment; Formats: Digital download, streaming; Track listing: 1. "九里庄人才中心 (浴池Live版)" (Jiulizhuang Talent Center (Bathhouse Live Version)); 2. "霓裳 (浴池Live版)" (Nichang (Bathhouse Live Version); 3. "冷屁股 (浴池Live版)" (Cold Shoulder (Bathhouse Live Version)); 4. "五光十色 (浴池Live版)" (Technicolor (Bathhouse Live Version)); 5. "月亮代表我的心 + 我爱洗澡 (浴池Live版)" (The Moon Represents My Heart + I Love Taking a Bath (Bathhouse Live Version)); 6. "亲爱的，这里没有一个人 (浴池Live版)" (Colorful Human (Bathhouse Live Version)); 7. "她等在午夜前 (浴池Live版)" (She Waited Till Midnight (Bathhouse Live Version)); 8. "粉雾海 (浴池Live版)" (Ripples In My Heart (Bathhouse Live Version)); 9. "沉潜 (浴池Live版)" (Devoted Focus (Bathhouse Live Version)); 10. "头上的包 (浴池Live版)" (The Bumps On My Head (Bathhouse Live Version))
Que Xue 2025 (Live) (礐嶨2025 (Live))	Released: 4 December 2025; Label: Tencent Music Entertainment; Formats: Digital download, streaming; Number of tracks: 37; Disc 1 track listing: 1. "冬景：嗡鸣" (Winter—The Humming Sound); 2. "楔木 (Live)" (Wooden Wedge (Live)); 3. "亲爱的，这里没有一个人 (Live)" (Colorful Human (Live)); 4. Don't Tie Me Down (Live); 5. 未来的主人翁 (Live) (Master of the Future (Live)); 6. 四字歌 (Live) (Si Zi Ge (Live)); Disc 2 track listing: 1. 春日：舞夜 (Spring—The Dancing Night); 2. 九里庄人才中心 (Live) (Jiulizhuang Talent Center (Live)); 3. 五光十色 (Live) (Technicolor (Live)); 4. 冷屁股 (Live) (Cold Shoulder (Live)); 5. 白日猫 (Live) (Cat in the Daytime (Live)); 6. 她等在午夜前 (Live) (She Waited Till Midnight (Live)); Disc 3 track listing: 1. 夏令：潜息 (Summer—The Silent Breath); 2. 黑光 + 两个傍晚的月亮 (Live) (Blacklight + Moon (Live)); 3. 逢石 (Live) (Fengshi (Live)); 4. 再一，再二，再三 (Live) (Again and Again (Live)); 5. 沉潜 (Live) (Devoted Focus (Live)); 6. 步语 (Live) (Walking Thoughts (Live)); 7. 陷落美好 (Live) (Free Falling (Live)); Disc 4 track listing: 1. 秋时：纸船 (Autumn—The Paper Boat); 2. 粉雾海 (Live) (Ripples in My Heart (Live)); 3. 末日长河 (Live) (The Last River (Live)); 4. 冷静和热情之间 (Live) (Between Dreams (Live)); 5. 抚琴小夜曲 (Live) (Serenade From The Strings (Live)); 6. 山花 (Live) (Mountain Flowers (Live)); 7. 生活倒影 (Live) (Shadow of Life (Live)); 8. 送别 (Live) (Farewell (Live)); 9. 终 (Fin); Disc 5 track listing: 1. Encore; 2. 4%vol的河 (Live) (4%vol River (Live)); 3. 念想 + Fly (Live) (Better Us + Fly (Live)); 4. 送你一朵小红花 (Live) (A Litte Red Flower (Live)); 5. 这条小鱼在乎 + 干杯朋友 (Live) (I'm a Little Fish + Cheers, My Friend (Live)); 6. My Boo (Live); 7. 谁 (Live) (Who (Live)); 8. 舒适圈 (Live) (Unique Zone (Live)); 9. 同乘 (Live) (Sharing a Ride (Live))

== Singles ==
=== As lead artist ===
Title	Year	Peak chart positions		Album
Title	Year	CHN Top	CHN V Chart	Album
"Dream Skyscraper" (夢想摩天樓)	2013	—	—	Non-album single
"You Say" (你说)	2016	—	—	Non-album single
"Nothing to Lose"	2017	—	—	Non-album single
"Unpredictable"	2017	—	—	Non-album single
"Overrun" (災)	2018	—	—	Non-album single
"Colorful Human" (亲爱的，这里没有一个人)	2018	65	—	Non-album single
"Warm Blooded" (恒温动物)	2018	69	—	Non-album single
"Free Falling" (陷落美好)	2019	7	—	Non-album single
"Fall"	2019	17	—	Non-album single
"I Adore You"	2019	—	—	Non-album single
"Between Dreams" (冷静和热情之间)	2019	—	—	Non-album single
"Ripples In The Heart" (粉雾海)	2020	—	—	Non-album single
"My Boo"	2020	—	—	Non-album single
"Si Zi Ge" (Note: literal meaning: Four-Character Song) (四字歌)	2021	—	—	Non-album single
"4%vol River" (4%vol的河)	2023	—	—	Non-album single
"Embrace the Starry Ocean" (不辞星海)	2024	—	—	Non-album single

=== Soundtrack appearances ===
Title	Year	Peak chart positions	Album
Title	Year	CHN V Chart	Album
"The Lament" (离骚)	2017	1	Song of Phoenix OST
"Better Us" (念想)	2019	—	Better Days promotion song
"Day And Night" (不分昼夜)	2020	—	Leap promotion song
"Same Old Silly Kid" (还是笨小孩) (Note: Adapted from "Stupid Child" (笨小孩) by Andy Lau, Blackie Ko, Jacky Wu in 1998) (with Andy Lau)	2022	—	Nice View OST
"Boundless Oceans, Vast Skies" (海阔天空) (Note: A cover of "Boundless Oceans, Vast Skies" (海阔天空) by Beyond in 1993) (with Xue Junchong, Tian Yu, Wang Ning, Gong Lei, Huang Yao, Qi Xi)	2022	—	Nice View OST
"Snowflake" (雪花)	2022	—	The Battle at Lake Changjin II theme song
"No Sleep Tonight" (今夜无眠)	2023	—	Full River Red New Year promotion song
"A Tapestry Of A Legendary Land" (只此青绿)	2024	—	A Tapestry Of A Legendary Land ending song
"I'm a Little Fish" (这条小鱼在乎) (Note: A cover of "I'm a Little Fish" (这条小鱼在乎) by Wang OK, Hung Pei-Yu in 2024)	2025	—	Big World Liu Chunhe's late night melody
"Song of Altay" (阿勒泰之歌)	2025	—	My City Altay theme song

=== Promotional singles ===
Title	Year	Peak chart positions	Notes
Title	Year	CHN Top	Notes
"Magnificent Landscape in Painting" (丹青千里)	2018	—	Tencent Next Idea Music Innovation Competition promotion song
"This Is Just The Beginning" (精彩才刚刚开始)	2018	73	Tmall 10th Anniversary promotion song
"Stars and Dreams" (繁星追梦)	2020	—	Honor of Kings promotion song
"Cheer Up As One" (1起挺你)	2020	—	Tmall Double 11 promotion song
"Life Should be This Loving" (生活就该这么爱)	2022	—	Tmall 618 promotion song
"Gold Dust" (沙金)	2022	—	Honor of Kings Year of Alsahraa 2022
"Clear Head Be Fearless" (无畏清扬)	2023	—	Clear promotion song
"Convergence From The Two Ends Of Time" (从时间的两端汇合)	2024	—	Jaeger-Lecoultre promotion song
"A Grain of Sand That Longs for the Sea" (想看海的一粒沙)	2025	—	Milk Deluxe 20th Anniversary promotion song

=== Special singles ===
Title	Year	Notes
"Future Invites You To Come" (未来，请你来！)	2021	2021 PLA Air Force's Pilot Cadet recruitment promotion song
"Together for a Shared Future" (一起向未来)	2021	2022 Winter Olympics promotion song
"Seed" (Note: In remembrance of Academician Yuan Longping, it's released on the first anniversary of his death) (种子)	2022	In remembrance of Academician Yuan Longping
"Big Eyes" (大眼睛)	2023	Project Hope promotion song
"Don't Wait" (莫等闲)	2024	Celebration of PLA Day
"Time" (时光)	2024	Celebration of 75th anniversary of the founding of the PRC
"Guarding the Windows of the Hearts" (守一扇心窗)	2025	Protect the Seedlings theme song
"Together to the Mountains and Seas" (共赴山海)	2025	The 12th National Games for Persons with Disabilities and the 9th National Special Olympic Games theme song
"Hear" (听见)	2026	Hear China, Hear You Contemporary Song Creation and Performance Program theme song

== Collaborations ==
Title	Year	Notes
"Embracing You" (拥抱你) (with Wu Muye, Guan Xiaotong and Jevon Wang)	2017	The 30th World AIDS Day Theme Song
"Starry Sea" (星辰大海) (with 31 other actors)	2019	For China Movie Channel Young Performers Program
"Welcome Back To Sound" (朋友请听好) (with He Jiong and Xie Na)	2020	Theme song for variety show Welcome Back To Sound
"The Story of Time 2022" (光阴的故事2022) (with Lo Ta-yu)	2022	Bilibili 2022 graduation song
"Tomorrow Will Be Better" (明天会更好) (Note: A cover of "Tomorrow Will Be Better" (明天会更好) by Lo Ta-yu in 1986) (with various artists)	2023	2024 Cross-Strait New Year Song
"Snow in Harbin" (尔滨的雪) (with Shan Yichun)	2024	2025 Asian Winter Games Official Anthem
