= Hundred Flowers Award for Best Supporting Actor =

Chinese film award

The Hundred Flowers Award for Best Supporting Actor was first awarded by the China Film Association in 1962.

== Award winners ==
=== 1960s ===
Year	Actor	Film	Character
1962 (1st)	Chen Qiang	The Red Detachment of Women	Nan Batian
1963 (2nd)	Zhong Xinghuo	Li Shuangshuang	Sun Xiwang

=== 1980–2004 ===
Year	Actor	Film	Character
1980 (3rd)	—N/a	—N/a	—N/a
1981 (4th)	—N/a	—N/a	—N/a
1982 (5th)	—N/a	—N/a	—N/a
1983 (6th)	Niu Ben	The Herdsman	Guo Piazi
1984 (7th)	Liu Xinyi	The Happy Single Man	Shi Qilong
1985 (8th)	He Wei	Wreaths at the Foot of the Mountain	Jin Kailai
1986 (9th)	Chen Yude	Our Demobbed Soldier	Liu Tiedan
1987 (10th)	Zhu Shibin	Hibiscus Town	Wang Qiushe
1988 (11th)	Chen Peisi	Soccer Heroes	Zhao Huli
1989 (12th)	Shen Junyi	The Happy Hero & The Dead and the Living	Xu Sanduo
1990 (13th)	Sun Feihu	The Birth of New China	Chiang Kai-shek
1991 (14th)	Chen Yude	Cockfight	Sun Laojue
1992 (15th)	Ge You	Chinese New Year	second brother-in-law
1993 (16th)	Feng Gong	Stand Up, Don't Bend Over	Writer Gao
1994 (17th)	Sun Feihu	Chongqing Negotiations	Chiang Kai-shek
1995 (18th)	Xie Yuan	A Born Coward	Ma Qiang
1996 (19th)	Fang Zitian	The Strangers in Beijing	Zhe Yili
1997 (20th)	Niu Ben	Husband Sings, Wife Accompanies	Liu Erli
1998 (21st)	Li Baotian	Keep Cool	Old Zhang
1999 (22nd)	Niu Ben	Wife, You Take Over	Cao Sanmao
2000 (23rd)	You Yong	Crash Landing	Liu Yuan
2001 (24th)	Zhu Xu	The Gua Sha Treatment	grandfather
2002 (25th)	Ying Da	Big Shot's Funeral	Louie Wang
2003 (26th)	Wang Zhiwen	Together	Professor Jiang
2004 (27th)	—N/a	—N/a	—N/a

=== Since 2006 ===
Year	Actor	Film	Character
2006; 28th	Nicholas Tse	New Police Story	Frank Cheng Siu-fung
2006; 28th	Andy Lau	House of Flying Daggers	Captain Liu
2006; 28th	Dong Yong	Fearless	Nong Jinsun
2006; 28th	Yuen Wah	Kung Fu Hustle	landlord
2006; 28th	Wang Qingxiang	Ren Changxia	Zheng Gang
2008; 29th	Deng Chao	Assembly	Zhao Erdou
2008; 29th	Jay Chou	Curse of the Golden Flower	Prince Jie
2008; 29th	Xu Zheng	Crazy Stone	Feng Hai
2008; 29th	Chin Han	The Knot	Wang Tingwu
2008; 29th	Chen Baoguo	Rob-B-Hood	mafia boss
2010; 30th	Alec Su	The Message	Bai Xiaonian
2010; 30th	Li Youbin	Stands Still, the Last Great Wall	Liang Zhidong
2010; 30th	Feng Yuanzheng	If You Are the One	Ai Moli
2010; 30th	Jaycee Chan	Mulan	Fei Xiaohu
2010; 30th	Huang Bo	Iron Man	Zhao Yilin
2012; 31st	Sun Chun	1911	Yuan Shikai
2012; 31st	David Wang	Love Is Not Blind	Wei Yiran
2012; 31st	Li Chen	Aftershock	Fang Da
2012; 31st	Aarif Rahman	Echoes of the Rainbow	Law Chun-yat
2012; 31st	Zhang Jiayi	The Founding of a Party	Li Dazhao
2014; 32nd	Tong Dawei	American Dreams in China	Wang Yang
2014; 32nd	Han Geng	So Young	Lin Jing
2014; 32nd	Bao Bei'er	So Young	Zhang Kai
2014; 32nd	Zhang Jin	The Grandmaster	Ma San
2014; 32nd	He Wei	The Story of Zhou Enlai	Guo Fenglin
2016; 33rd	Li Yifeng	Mr. Six	Zhang Xiaobo
2016; 33rd	Chen Xiao	The Taking of Tiger Mountain	Gao Bo
2016; 33rd	Zhang Yi	Dearest	Han Dezhong
2016; 33rd	Xia Yu	Mojin: The Lost Legend	Da Jin Ya
2016; 33rd	Duan Yihong	The Dead End	Yi Guchun
2018; 34th	Du Jiang	Operation Red Sea	Xu Hong
2018; 34th	Ma Tianyu	The Founding of an Army	Lin Biao
2018; 34th	Wu Gang	Wolf Warrior 2	He Jianguo
2018; 34th	Hans Zhang	Wolf Warrior 2	Zhuo Yifan
2018; 34th	Zhang Hanyu	Operation Red Sea	Gao Yun
2020; 35th	Eric Wang	Dying to Survive	Lü Shouyi
2020; 35th	Jing Boran	The Climbers	Li Guoliang
2020; 35th	Yin Xiaotian	The Bravest	Wei Lei
2020; 35th	Paul Chun	Sheep Without a Shepherd	Song En
2020; 35th	Wang Luoyong	My People, My Country	An Wenbin
2022; 36th	Hou Yong	Island Keeper	Wang Changjie
2022; 36th	Liu Haoran	1921	Liu Renjing
2022; 36th	Tian Yu	Nice View	Liang Yongcheng
2022; 36th	Jackson Yee	Chinese Doctors	Resident doctor Yang Xiaoyang
2022; 36th	Zhu Yawen	The Battle at Lake Changjin	Mei Sheng
2024; 37th	Li Xuejian	Creation of the Gods I: Kingdom of Storms	Duke Ji Chang
2024; 37th	Zhang Yi	Full River Red	He Li
2024; 37th	Zhang Songwen	Pegasus 2	Wu Xiuquan
2024; 37th	Fan Chengcheng	Pegasus 2	Li Xiaohai
2024; 37th	Wei Daxun	The Volunteers: To the War	Mao Anying

== Records ==
Items	Name	Statistics	Notes
Most win	Niu Ben	3 wins	
Oldest winner	Zhu Xu	Age 71	2001, for The Gua Sha Treatment
First Hong Kong actor win	Nicholas Tse	1 win	2006, for New Police Story
First Taiwan actor win	Alec Su	1 win	2010, for The Message
