= List of Chinese films of 2022 =

The following is a list of mainland Chinese films first released in year 2022.

== Box office ==
The highest-grossing Chinese films released in 2022, by domestic box office gross revenue, are as follows:

Rank	Title	Domestic gross
1	The Battle at Lake Changjin II	CN¥4.07 billion ($603.67 million)
2	Moon Man	CN¥3.10 billion ($460.58 million)
3	Too Cool to Kill	CN¥2.63 billion ($390.08 million)
4	Lighting Up the Stars	CN¥1.71 billion ($254.26 million)
5	Home Coming	CN¥1.59 billion ($236.45 million)
6	Nice View	CN¥1.38 billion ($204.69 million)
7	Boonie Bears: Back to Earth	CN¥977 million ($145.02 million)
8	Detective vs Sleuths	CN¥712 million ($105.68 million)
9	Warriors of Future	CN¥679 million ($100.78 million)
10	Sniper	CN¥608 million ($90.25 million)

== Released ==
=== January–March ===
Opening		Title	Director(s)	Cast	Genre	Ref.
J A N U A R Y	15	To the Bright Side	Various	Zhu Yuejia, Wang Shiyi, Yu Xiaofu, Jia Qiu	Animated	
F E B R U A R Y	1	The Battle at Lake Changjin II	Chen Kaige, Tsui Hark, Dante Lam	Wu Jing, Jackson Yee, Duan Yihong, Zhu Yawen, Li Chen	War	
F E B R U A R Y	1	Boonie Bears: Back to Earth	Lin Huida	Zhang Bingjun, Zhang Wei, Tan Xiao, Li Wanyao, Cheng Ziyang	Animated science fiction comedy	
F E B R U A R Y	1	Nice View	Wen Muye	Jackson Yee, Tian Yu, Chen Halin, Qi Xi, Gong Lei	Comedy-drama	
F E B R U A R Y	1	Pleasant Goat and Big Big Wolf: Dunk for Future	Huang Weiming, Huang Junming, Chen Lijin	Zu Liqing, Zhang Lin, Deng Yuting, Liang Ying, Liu Hongyun	Animated	
F E B R U A R Y	1	Sniper	Zhang Yimou, Zhang Mo	Chen Yongsheng, Zhang Yu, Zhang Yi, Liu Yitie, Lin Boyang	War	
F E B R U A R Y	1	Too Cool to Kill	Xing Wenxiong	Ma Li, Wei Xiang, Chen Minghao, Zhou Dayong, Huang Cailun	Action comedy	
F E B R U A R Y	14	Ten Years of Loving You	Zhao Fei	Ding Yuxi, Ren Min	Romantic drama	
F E B R U A R Y	14	Don't Forget I Love You	Wong Chun-chun	Gulnazar, Jasper Liu	Romantic comedy	
F E B R U A R Y	19	Me and My Winter Games	Lin Yongzhang, Li Haoling, Zhuang Hao, Qu Qiang		Animated	
F E B R U A R Y	25	Breaking Through	Wang Fangfang	Meng Meiqi, Xia Yu, Pei Kuishan, Sa Rina, Jiao Gang	Sports	

=== April–June ===
Opening		Title	Director(s)	Cast	Genre	Ref.
J U N E	18	One Week Friends	Gavin Lin	Zhao Jinmai, Lin Yi, Shen Yue, Wang Jiahui, Fan Shiran	Drama	
J U N E	24	Lighting Up the Stars	Liu Jiangjiang	Zhu Yilong, Yang Enyou, Wang Ge, Liu Lu, Luo Jingmin	Drama	

=== July–September ===
Opening		Title	Director(s)	Cast	Genre	Ref.
J U L Y	1	Ode to the Spring	Zhou Nan, Zhang Chi, Tian Yusheng, Dong Tue, Rao Xiaozhi	Zhou Dongyu, Yin Fang, Song Xiaobao, Pan Binlong, Wang Jingchun, Zhao Jinmai, Huang Chao, Bolo Yeung, Huang Xiaoming, Song Jia, Zhang Hangcheng	Drama	
J U L Y	8	Detective vs Sleuths	Wai Ka-fai	Sean Lau, Charlene Choi, Raymond Lam, Carman Lee, Tan Kai	Action thriller	
J U L Y	8	Return to Dust	Li Ruijun	Wu Renlin, Hai Qing, Yang Guangrui, Li Shengfu	Drama	
J U L Y	15	Mozart from Space	Chen Sicheng	Huang Bo, Rong Zishan, Yao Chen, Fan Wei, Huangyang Tiantian	Science fiction comedy	
J U L Y	29	Moon Man	Zhang Chiyu	Shen Teng, Ma Li, Chang Yuan, Li Chengru, Huang Cailun	Science fiction comedy	
J U L Y	29	Septet: The Story of Hong Kong	Various	Timmy Hung, Francis Ng, Sire Ma, Jennifer Yu, Ian Gouw	Anthology, historical drama	
A U G U S T	5	Warriors of Future	Ng Yuen-fai	Louis Koo, Sean Lau, Carina Lau, Philip Keung, Tse Kwan-ho	Science fiction action	
A U G U S T	13	The Fallen Bridge	Li Yu	Ma Sichun, Wang Junkai, Fan Wei, Chloe Maayan, Li Xiaochuan	Drama	
A U G U S T	13	Goodbye Monster	Huang Jianming	Liu Cong, Wang Kai, Zhang Zhe, Zhang Lei, Wang Guannan	Animated fantasy	
A U G U S T	19	New Gods: Yang Jian	Zhao Ji	Wang Kai, Ji Guanlin, Li Lihong, Li Lanling, Zhao Yi	Animated fantasy	
S E P T E M B E R	9	Hero	Sylvia Chang, Li Shaohong, Joan Chen	Zhou Xun, Sammi Cheng, Jackson Yee, Xu Di, Stephen Fung, Huang Miyi	Anthology	
S E P T E M B E R	9	In Search of Lost Time	Derek Yee	Chen Baoguo, Ma Su, Ayanga, Wang Qiang, Luo Yichun	Drama	
S E P T E M B E R	9	Give Me Five	Zhang Luan	Ma Li, Chang Yuan, Wei Xiang, Jia Bing, Huang Yuntong	Comedy-drama	
S E P T E M B E R	10	Song of Spring	Yang Lina	Wu Yanshu, Xi Meijuan	Drama	
S E P T E M B E R	30	Home Coming	Rao Xiaozhi	Zhang Yi, Wang Junkai, Yin Tao	War drama	
S E P T E M B E R	30	Steel Will	Ning Haiqiang	Liu Ye, Han Xue, Lin Yongjian, Zhang Guoqiang	Historical drama	
S E P T E M B E R	30	Ordinary Hero	Tony Chan	Li Bingbing, Feng Shaofeng, Huang Xiaoming, Lin Yongjian, Zhang Yishan	Drama	

=== October–December ===
Opening		Title	Director(s)	Cast	Genre	Ref.
O C T O B E R	1	New Happy Dad and Son 5: My Alien Friend	Ye Lin, Li Weisi	Liu Chunyan, Dong Hao, Ju Ping, Hong Guoguo, Chen Yi	Animated science fiction comedy	
O C T O B E R	3	Polar Rescue	Law Chi-leung	Donnie Yen, Han Xue, Jia Bing, Tang Xu, Hou Tianlai	Disaster	
N O V E M B E R	11	The Tipping Point	David Lam	Zhou Yiwei, Qin Hailu, Eric Tsang, Julian Cheung, Shao Bing	Action crime	
D E C E M B E R	30	A Wiz Named Wukong	Tan Jie	Seira Ryū, Gao Feng, Liu Cong, Tut Hamun, Lin Maomao	Animated fantasy	
D E C E M B E R	30	Better Man	Zhang Qi	Chang Yuan, Li Jiaqi, Wei Xiang, Wang Chengsi, Huang Cailun	Comedy	

== See also ==
- List of Chinese films of 2021
- List of Chinese films of 2023
