= 35th Hundred Flowers Awards =

Chinese film awards ceremony in 2020

35thth Hundred Flowers Awards
- Date: September 26, 2020
- Site: Zhengzhou, Henan, China
- Organized by: China Film Association

Highlights
- Best Feature Film: My People, My Country
- Best Direction: Frant Gwo; The Wandering Earth
- Best Actor: Huang Xiaoming; The Bravest
- Best Actress: Zhou Dongyu; Better Days

Television coverage
- Network: CCTV

The 35th Hundred Flowers Awards was held on September 26, 2020 in Zhengzhou, Henan, China. My People, My Country received the Best Picture Award, while Frant Gwo, director of the science fiction film The Wandering Earth was crowned with the Best Director title. Huang Xiaoming won Best Actor for his performance in The Bravest, and Zhou Dongyu won Best Actress for her role in Better Days.

== Winners and nominees ==
Best Picture	Best Director
My People, My Country; Dying to Survive; Better Days; Ne Zha; The Wandering Earth	Frant Gwo for The Wandering Earth; Chan Kwok-Fai for The Bravest; Chen Kaige/ Zhang Yibai/ Guan Hu/ Xue Xiaolu/ Xu Zheng/ Ning Hao/ Wen Muye for My People, My Country; Jiaozi for Ne Zha; Derek Tsang for Better Days
Best Writing	Best Newcomer
Jiaozi for Ne Zha; Yu Yonggan/ Chan Kwok-Fai for The Bravest; Lam Wing Sum/ Li Yuan/ Xu Yimeng for Better Days; Gong Ge'er/ Yan Dongxu/ Frant Gwo/ Ye Junce/ Yang Zhixue/ Wu Yi/ Ye Ruchang/ Shen Jingjign for The Wandering Earth; Han Jianü/ Zhong Wei/ Wen Muye for Dying to Survive	Jackson Yee for Better Days; Wen Muye for Dying to Survive; Zhang Yamei for The Captain; Zhang Xiran for Sheep Without a Shepherd; Han Haolinfor My People, My Country
Best Actor	Best Actress
Huang Xiaoming for The Bravest; Xiao Yang for Sheep Without a Shepherd; Zhang Yi for My People, My Country; Zhang Hanyu for The Captain; Chow Yun-fat for Project Gutenberg	Zhou Dongyu for Better Days; Zhang Jingchu for Project Gutenberg; Zhang Ziyi for The Climbers; Kara Wai for My People, My Country; Tan Zhuo for Sheep Without a Shepherd
Best Supporting Actor	Best Supporting Actress
Eric Wang for Dying to Survive; Wang Luoyong for My People, My Country; Jing Boran for The Climbers; Yin Xiaotian for The Bravest; Paul Chun for Sheep Without a Shepherd	Yuan Quan for The Captain; Feng Wenjuan for Project Gutenberg; Choenyi Tsering for The Climbers; Yang Zi for The Bravest; Wu Yue for Better Days
Outstanding Film
Dying to Survive
