= List of Chinese films of 2023 =

The following is a list of mainland Chinese films first released in year 2023.

== Box office ==
The highest-grossing Chinese films released in 2023, by domestic box office gross revenue, are as follows:

Rank	Title	Domestic gross
1	Full River Red	CN¥4.54 billion ($641.45 million)
2	The Wandering Earth 2	CN¥4.04 billion ($570.72 million)
3	No More Bets	CN¥3.85 billion ($543.34 million)
4	Lost in the Stars	CN¥3.52 billion ($497.32 million)
5	Creation of the Gods I: Kingdom of Storms	CN¥2.64 billion ($372.11 million)
6	Never Say Never	CN¥2.21 billion ($311.55 million)
7	Chang'an	CN¥1.82 billion ($257.48 million)
8	Boonie Bears: Guardian Code	CN¥1.50 billion ($211.04 million)
9	Under the Light	CN¥1.35 billion ($190.71 million)
10	Johnny Keep Walking!	CN¥1.29 billion ($182.38 million)

== Released ==
=== January–March ===
Opening		Title	Director(s)	Cast	Genre	Ref.
J A N U A R Y	22	Boonie Bears: Guardian Code	Lin Yongchang, Shao Heqi	Zhang Bingjun, Zhang Wei, Tan Xiao, Miao Yingying, Jia Chenlu	Animated science fiction comedy	
J A N U A R Y	22	Deep Sea	Tian Xiaopeng	Wang Tingwen, Su Xin, Teng Kuixing, Yang Ting, Ji Jing	Animated fantasy	
J A N U A R Y	22	Five Hundred Miles	Su Lun	Lei Jiayin, Zhang Xiaofei, Zhang Youhao	Fantasy comedy	
J A N U A R Y	22	Full River Red	Zhang Yimou	Shen Teng, Jackson Yee, Zhang Yi, Lei Jiayin, Yue Yunpeng	Historical thriller	
J A N U A R Y	22	Hidden Blade	Cheng Er	Tony Leung, Wang Yibo, Zhou Xun, Huang Lei, Hiroyuki Mori	Espionage thriller	
J A N U A R Y	22	The Wandering Earth 2	Frant Gwo	Wu Jing, Andy Lau, Li Xuejian, Sha Yi, Ning Li	Science fiction action-adventure	
F E B R U A R Y	17	Ping Pong: The Triumph	Deng Chao, Yu Baimei	Deng Chao, Sun Li, Xu Weizhou, Duan Bowen, Cai Yida	Period sports drama	
F E B R U A R Y	24	A Guilty Conscience	Ng Wai-lun	Dayo Wong, Tse Kwan-ho, Louise Wong, Fish Liew, Adam Pak	Mystery crime comedy	
M A R C H	10	Post Truth	Dong Chengpeng	Da Peng, Li Xueqin, Yin Zheng, Victoria Song, Wang Xun	Comedy	
M A R C H	10	Revival	Lai Mukuan	Ren Suxi, Liu Mintao, Hu Ke, Wu Hao-chen, Zhang Juanyi	Crime thriller	
M A R C H	18	The Cord of Life	Sixue Qiao	Badema, Yider, Nahia	Drama	
M A R C H	24	The Best Is Yet to Come	Wang Jing	White K, Miao Miao, Zhang Songwen, Song Yang, Lie Wang	Drama	
M A R C H	31	Hachiko	Xu Ang	Feng Xiaogang, Joan Chen, Pax Congo	Drama	

=== April–June ===
Opening		Title	Director(s)	Cast	Genre	Ref.
A P R I L	1	Journey to the West	Dashan Kong	Haoyu Yang, Liya Ai, Qiming Jiang, Yitong Wang	Science fiction comedy	
A P R I L	7	Ride On	Larry Yang	Jackie Chan, Liu Haocun, Guo Qilin, Wu Jing, Joey Yung	Action drama	
A P R I L	28	All These Years	Ji Zhuqing	Zhang Xincheng, Sun Qian, Zhang Ruonan, Liu Dan, Tao Hai	Romance	
A P R I L	28	Born to Fly	Liu Xiaoshi	Wang Yibo, Hu Jun, Yu Shi, Zhou Dongyu	Action drama	
A P R I L	28	Flashover	Peng Shun	Du Jiang, Wang Qianyuan, Tong Liya, Han Xue, Yu Haoming, Han Dongjun, Wang Ge,	Action drama	
A P R I L	28	Godspeed	Jiaoshou Yi Xiaoxing	Qiao Shan, Fan Chengcheng, Ma Li, Zhang Jingyi, Chang Yuan	Comedy road movie	
A P R I L	29	Cosmicrew: Storm Force	Liu Peng	Li Jing, Liu Ruoban, Zheng Lian, Li Fei, Feng Bo	Animated action adventure	
A P R I L	29	GG Bond: Racing 72H	Zhong Yu	Lu Shuang, Shi Bei, Zhang Yechuan, Xu Jingwei, Liang Jingjing	Animated action-adventure comedy	
M A Y	20	Too Beautiful to Lie	Yang Yuanhan	Zhang Ruonan, Wu Yuhan, Wu Yanshu, Bo Guanjin, Ma Li	Romantic comedy	
J U N E	1	Qiaohu and the Fantastic Magic Circus	Tomohiro Kawamura	Li Ye, Shen Dawei, Luo Yuting, Wang Xiaotong, Huang Chen	Animated fantasy	
J U N E	22	The Fantastic Journey of Three Fools	Liu Xiaoguang		Animated comedy	
J U N E	22	Lost in the Stars	Cui Rui, Liu Xiang	Zhu Yilong, Ni Ni, Janice Man, Du Jiang, Kay Huang	Mystery crime	

=== July–September ===
Opening		Title	Director(s)	Cast	Genre	Ref.
J U L Y	1	Happy Mom and Girl: Sweetheart on Mission	Xu Zheng	Chen Su, Jia Jie, Geng Chenchen, Wang Hao, Liu Yang	Animated science fiction comedy	
J U L Y	6	Never Say Never	Wang Baoqiang	Wang Baoqiang, Chen Yongsheng, Shi Pengyuan, Wang Xun, Zhang Yirong	Sports drama	
J U L Y	8	Chang'an	Xie Junwei, Zou Jing	Yang Tianxiang, Ling Zhenhe, Liu Jiaoyu, Ya Jie, Ba He	Animated historical drama	
J U L Y	14	Oh My School!	Xia Mingze, Yan Kai	Xing Yuanyuan, Wang Bowen, Gao Yuheng, Huang Heng, Guo Hongjin	Animated	
J U L Y	20	Creation of the Gods I: Kingdom of Storms	Wuershan	Yu Shi, Fei Xiang, Li Xuejian, Huang Bo, Narana Erdyneeva	Epic fantasy	
J U L Y	28	One and Only	Dong Chengpeng	Huang Bo, Wang Yibo, Liu Mintao, Yue Yunpeng, Song Zu'er	Dance comedy	
J U L Y	29	Shimmy: The First Monkey King	Ralph Zondag, Dick Zontag, Michelle Qi	Zhong Wei, Zhang Qi, Zhang Xin, Meng Xianglong, Cheng Yuzhu	Animated fantasy adventure	
A U G U S T	4	Meg 2: The Trench	Ben Wheatley	Jason Statham, Wu Jing, Sophia Cai, Page Kennedy, Sergio Peris-Mencheta	Science fiction action	
A U G U S T	8	No More Bets	Shen Ao	Lay Zhang, Gina Jin, Yong Mei, Eric Wang, Darren Wang	Crime thriller	
A U G U S T	18	Papa	Su Liang	Huang Bo, Dan Yuhao, Yan Ni, Janine Chang, Zhang Zixian	Comedy	
A U G U S T	19	Warrior King	Lu Qi	Zhang He, Liu Yinuo, Liu Cong, Zhang Ai, Guo Zhengjian	Animated fantasy	
S E P T E M B E R	9	All Ears	Liu Jiayin	Hu Ge, Leo Wu, Qi Xi	Drama	
S E P T E M B E R	9	Dust to Dust	Li Zijun	Da Peng, Gordon Lam, Zhang Songwen, Xi Qi, Sun Yang	Crime	
S E P T E M B E R	28	The Ex-Files 4: Marriage Plan	Tian Yusheng	Han Geng, Zheng Kai, Kelly Yu, Ceng Mengxue, Luo Mi	Romantic comedy	
S E P T E M B E R	28	Moscow Mission	Herman Yau	Zhang Hanyu, Andy Lau, Huang Xuan, Janice Man, Gu Jiacheng	Action	
S E P T E M B E R	28	Under the Light	Zhang Yimou	Lei Jiayin, Zhang Guoli, Yu Hewei, Zhou Dongyu, Sun Yizhou	Crime	
S E P T E M B E R	28	The Volunteers: To the War	Chen Kaige	Tang Guoqiang, Wan Yanhui, Liu Jing, Xin Baiqing, Zhang Songwen	War	
S E P T E M B E R	29	I Am Nezha 2	Wen Di, Chen Chaoyi	Wang Wei, Jiven Teng, Fu Chenyang, Liu Sanmu, Qing Minyi	Animated fantasy	

=== October–December ===
Opening		Title	Director(s)	Cast	Genre	Ref.
O C T O B E R	21	Only the River Flows	Wei Shujun	Zhu Yilong, Chloe Maayan, Hou Tianlai, Tong Linkai, Kang Chunlei	Neo-noir crime	
N O V E M B E R	1	Last Suspect	Zhang Mo	Zhang Xiaofei, Lee Hong-chi, Kara Wai, Wang Ziyi, Terence Yin	Mystery crime	
N O V E M B E R	24	Beyond the Clouds	Zheng Dasheng, Yang Jin	Hai Qing, Chen Yongsheng, Chai Ye, Wang Yueting, Wan Guopeng	Biographical	
N O V E M B E R	25	Across the Furious Sea	Cao Baoping	Huang Bo, Zhou Xun, Zu Feng, Zhang Youhao, Zhou Yiran	Crime thriller	
D E C E M B E R	8	The Invisible Guest	Chen Zhuo	Greg Hsu, Janine Chang, Kara Wai, Yin Zheng, Qian Yi	Thriller	
D E C E M B E R	15	Endless Journey	Dai Mo	Zhang Yi, Li Chen, Vision Wei, Cao Bingkun, Wang Xiao	Crime drama	
D E C E M B E R	16	Wolf Hiding	Marc Ma	Nick Cheung, Ethan Juan, Darren Wang, Paul Chun, Marc Ma	Thriller	
D E C E M B E R	29	I Did It My Way	Jason Kwan	Andy Lau, Gordon Lam, Cya Liu, Eddie Peng, Simon Yam	Action thriller	
D E C E M B E R	29	Johnny Keep Walking!	Dong Runnian	Da Peng, Bai Ke, Zhuang Dafei, Wang Xun, Sun Yizhou	Comedy	
D E C E M B E R	30	The Adventures of Shuke and Beita	Zheng Yaqi	Yang Ning, Zhang Lu, Zheng Yuanjie, Wang Kai, Zheng Zai	Animated	
D E C E M B E R	30	If You Are the One 3	Feng Xiaogang	Ge You, Shu Qi, Fan Wei, Yao Chen, Li Chengru	Romantic comedy	
D E C E M B E R	30	Shining for One Thing	Chen Xiaoming, Zhang Pan	Qu Chuxiao, Zhang Jianing, Fu Jing, Jiang Yunlin, Tian Zhuangzhuang	Romantic fantasy	

== See also ==
- List of Chinese films of 2022
- List of Chinese films of 2024
