= 36th Hundred Flowers Awards =

Chinese film awards ceremony in 2022

36thth Hundred Flowers Awards
- Date: July 30, 2022
- Site: Wuhan, Hubei, China
- Organized by: China Film Association

Highlights
- Best Feature Film: The Battle at Lake Changjin/ Hi, Mom
- Best Direction: Wen Muye; Nice View
- Best Actor: Zhang Yi; Cliff Walkers
- Best Actress: Yuan Quan; Chinese Doctors

Television coverage
- Network: CCTV

The 36th Hundred Flowers Awards was held on 30 July, 2022 in Wuhan, Hubei, China.

== Winners and nominees ==
The nominees for the 36th Hundred Flowers Awards were announced on 20 July 2022.

Best Picture	Best Director
The Battle at Lake Changjin; Hi, Mom; Nice View; A Little Red Flower; Chinese Doctors	Wen Muye for Nice View; Chen Kaige/ Tsui Hark/ Dante Lam for The Battle at Lake Changjin; Jia Ling for Hi, Mom; Andrew Lau for Chinese Doctors; Liuxun Zimo for Be Somebody
Best Writing	Best Newcomer
Li Bashen/ Liuxun Zimo/ Zhang Benyu/ Ke Da for Be Somebody; Jia Ling/ Sun Jibin for Hi, Mom; Lan Xiaolong/ Huang Jianxin for The Battle at Lake Changjin; Yu Yonggan for Chinese Doctors; Zhou Chuncen/ Xiu Mengdi/ Wen Muye/ Han Xiaodan/ Zhong Wei for Nice View	Chen Halin for Nice View; Qin Xiaoxian for Be Somebody; Ren Sinuo for My Country, My Parents; Xu Yu for Island Keeper; Yuan Jinhui for My Country, My Parents
Best Actor	Best Actress
Zhang Yi for Cliff Walkers; Liu Ye for Island Keeper; Shen Teng for My Country, My Parents; Wu Jing for The Battle at Lake Changjin; Jackson Yee for Nice View	Yuan Quan for Chinese Doctors; Deng Jiajia for Be Somebody; Jia Ling for Hi, Mom; Zhang Xiaofei for Hi, Mom; Zhang Zifeng for Sister
Best Supporting Actor	Best Supporting Actress
Hou Yong for Island Keeper; Liu Haoran for 1921; Tian Yu for Nice View; Jackson Yee for Chinese Doctors; Zhu Yawen for The Battle at Lake Changjin	Zhu Yuanyuan for Sister; Hai Qing for My Country, My Parents; Liu Jia for Hi, Mom; Qi Xi for Nice View; Zhou Ye for Chinese Doctors
Outstanding Film
Hi, Mom
