= Cities in Love =

- Theatrical release poster
- Chinese: 恋爱中的城市
- Directed by: Wen Muye; Dong Runnian; Han Yi; Fu Tien-yu; Yi Jiatong
- Written by: Dong Runnian; Wen Muye; Fu Tien-yu; Han Yi; Chen Shu
- Starring: Yang Mi; Kai-Yuan Zheng; Jiang Shuying; Meng Li; Hyun-Jae Lee; Sandrine Pinna; Xuan Huang; Jiang Yiyan; Joseph Chang; Bai Baihe; Ethan Juan
- Cinematography: Kwan Pun Leung; Wang Boxue; Lai Yiu-fai; Yu Lik-wai
- Edited by: Liu Chuan-Hui
- Music by: Su Junjie
- Production companies: Shanghai Yiyantang Entertainment Co.; Beijing Skywheel Entertainment; Heyi Pictures
- Release date: 20 August 2015 (China)
- Running time: 117 minutes
- Country: China
- Language: Mandarin
- Box office: US$8.1 million

Cities in Love (Chinese: 恋爱中的城市) is a 2015 Chinese romance anthology film directed by Wen Muye, Dong Runnian, Yi Han, Fu Tien-yu and Yi Jiatong. It was released on August 20, 2015. The film features five love stories (each by a different director) set in five cities (Shanghai, Prague, Florence, Paris, Hokkaido).

== Cast ==
- Yang Mi as
- Kai-Yuan Zheng as Pi Te
- Jiang Shuying as Jiang
- Meng Li
- Hyun-Jae Lee
- Sandrine Pinna as Fan Li Sha Zhang
- Huang Xuan as Liu Chang
- Jiang Yiyan
- Joseph Chang
- Bai Baihe
- Ethan Juan

== Reception ==
The film earned CN¥53.615 million at the Chinese box office.

== See also ==
- Run for Love (2016), Chinese film with similar premise
