= Hainan International Film Festival =

Film festival in Sanya, China

Hainan Island International Film Festival
- Location: Sanya, Hainan, China
- Founded: 9 December 2018; 7 years ago
- Website: www.hiiff.net

The Hainan Island International Film Festival (Chinese: 海南岛国际电影节) is a film festival held in Sanya, Hainan, China. The inaugural festival was held from December 9 to 16, and included forums, ceremonies, and competitions. Actor Jackie Chan is the promotional ambassador.

Along with Chan, the festival was attended by a number of international film personalities, including Turkish film director Nuri Bilge Ceylan, Bollywood star Aamir Khan, and Hollywood film stars such as Johnny Depp, Nicolas Cage and Mads Mikkelsen. The festival's top prize was awarded to Dying to Survive, with the award presented by Khan.

== Festivals ==
Date	Festival
December 16, 2018	1st Hainan Island International Film Festival
December 1, 2019	2nd Hainan Island International Film Festival
December 5, 2020	3rd Hainan Island International Film Festival
December 18, 2022	4th Hainan Island International Film Festival
December 16, 2023	5th Hainan Island International Film Festival

== Award winners ==
=== 1st Session ===
Film of the Year: "Dying To Survive"

Director of the Year: Wen Muye "Dying To Survive"

Actor of the Year: Xu Zheng in "Dying To Survive", Aaron Kwok in "Project Gutenberg"

Actress of the Year: Yao Chen in "Lost, Found"

Supporting Actor of the Year: Du Jiang "Operation Red Sea"

Supporting Actress of the Year: Feng Wenjuan "Project Gutenberg"

Screenwriter of the Year: He Jiping, Jiang Wen, Li Fei, Sun Yue, Zhang Beihai "Hidden Man"

New Actor of the Year: Yung Chung Erjia, "Ala Changso"

New Director of the Year: Dong Yue "The Looming Storm"

Animated Movie of the Year: "The Wind Guardians"

=== 2nd Session ===
Best Film Award: Penma Tseden's "Balloon" (Tibet)

Jury Prize: Oliver Laxe's "Fire Will Come" (Spain/France/Luxembourg)

Best Director Award: Wang Lina "The First Farewell" (China)

Best Screenplay Award: Mehdi Basoy "A Father's Search for a Liver" (Tunisia/France/Lebanon)

Best Actor Award: Sammy Boyajira "A Father's Search for a Liver", Ryuhei Matsuda "Beneath the Shadow" (Japan)

Best Actress Award: Suolang Wangmo "Balloon" (Tibet)

Best Technical Award: "Snake White" (China)

Best Children's Film Award: "1982" (United States/Lebanon/Norway/Qatar)

Best Documentary Award: "About Love" (India)

Best Short Film Award: "Everything Has Form" (Colombia)

Special Award of the Organizing Committee: "4K Ultra HD Live Movie" "At This Moment - Celebrating the 70th Anniversary of New China"

=== 4th Session ===
Best Picture Award: Laura Citarella's "In the Mist"

Best Director Award: Alice Diop "Saint Omer"

Jury Prize: Charlotte Wells, "Sunday Holiday"

Best Screenplay Award: Isabel Peña, Rodrigo Sorogoyan, "Those Beasts"

Best Actor Award: Karim Lakelu, "Sons of Paris"

Best Actress Award: Vera Gemma "Vera"

Best Technical Award: Qiao Sixue "Umbilical Cord"

Best Documentary Award: "We, the Students" by Rafiki Faala

Best Short Film Award: Thanasis Neofotistos "Stewardess-737"

=== 5th Session ===
Best Film Award: "Family Picture"

Jury Prize: "Summer Cicada"

Best Director Award: Wanma Tseden's "Snow Leopard"

Best Screenplay Award: Roberto Andò, Massimo Gaudioso, Ugo Chiti, "The Greatest Adventure"

Best Actor: Paul Kirsher, "Animal Kingdom"

Best Actress: Delague Campbell, "Family Pictures"

Best Short Film: "Swear to God"

Best Documentary: "Children of Boko Haram"

Best Children's Film: "Little Children"

Best Technical Award: "Family Photo"
