= I Hope You Are Well =

- Film poster
- 天堂的张望
- Directed by: Du Bin (杜斌)
- Written by: Du Bin
- Starring: Zhu Ziyue (朱梓玥); Du Yiheng (杜奕衡)
- Cinematography: Zeng Wu
- Edited by: Yang Yang
- Music by: Wei Hua
- Production company: Century Lealo Film
- Release date: 20 November 2020
- Running time: 116 minutes
- Country: China
- Language: Mandarin
- Box office: $327,000.00 USD

I Hope You Are Well (Chinese: 天堂的张望), also known as Heavenly Gaze, is a 2020 Chinese drama film directed by Chinese director Du Bin (杜斌). It is based on the true story of She Yan (佘艳), a seven-year-old Chinese girl abandoned on the street at birth and adopted by an extremely poor farmer who was later diagnosed with leukemia.

== Plot ==
Zhang Guohua (Chinese: 张国华）was raising his 7-year-old daughter Zhang Wang (Chinese: 张望) in conditions of extreme poverty. Nevertheless, they were living a happy life. One day, Zhang Wang suddenly had a nosebleed and her father took her to a large hospital for examination. They found out that she suffered from acute leukemia and the treatment would cost more than 300,000 yuan. Zhang Guohua tried desperately without success to raise money for her daughter and he was crying all day long. Zhang Wang, knowing her family situation, resolutely decided to give up treatment.

When reporter Wang Xiaoyue learned about this, she rushed to Zhang Guohua's home and asked to reveal how he adopted Zhang Wang. Zhang Guohua said that he had found Zhang Wang abandoned on the street on his way home when she was a newborn baby. All his friends and relatives suggested taking her back to the same place where he had found her but he decided to adopt her although he was very poor and could barely afford to feed himself. He didn't have enough money for milk powder, so he fed her with rice porridge. After the situation was exposed by the media, Zhang Wang attracted attention from everywhere and donations started to arrive from all over the country and Zhang Wang soon had enough money to afford the treatment. Feeling the power of social love and the care of countless strangers also made Zhang Wang much stronger.

She suffered pain that ordinary people could hardly imagine, and experienced the gates of hell many times. Zhang Wang wasn't allowed to eat any solid food; nevertheless, one day she opened a pack of instant noodles and ate some of it; this worsened her health and, when people expected her conditions to improve, she unexpectedly died.

== Inspiration ==
The movie is based on the true story of She Yan (Chinese: 佘艳), a Chinese girl who was abandoned at birth. On November 30, 1996, She Shiyou (佘仕友) was walking close to a small bridge in the village where he lived (Yunya Village, Group 2, Sanxing Town, Shuangliu District, Sichuan Province, Chinese: 四川省双流县三星镇云崖村二组) when he found in the grass an abandoned newborn girl, almost frozen to death. She had a piece of paper with her reading "October 20th (lunar calendar), 12:00".

At the beginning, She Shiyou was unsure about what to do, so he repeatedly put her down and picked her up. He already couldn't find a woman to marry since he was poor and adopting a child wouldn't improve his situation. Eventually, he decided to adopt the baby, sighing "You'll eat what I eat".

She Shiyou named her She Yan since she was born during the autumn harvest season. He couldn't afford milk powder, so he fed her with rice porridge. She Yan grew up very intelligent and sensible. She was very good at everything she did. She helped her father with housework and also excelled at school. She knew that she had to be very well-behaved and not cause her father any worry or anger. Moreover, she had to get high scores at school, so as to make her illiterate father very proud of her in their village.

Starting from May 2025, she started to have frequent nosebleeds; red spots also appeared on her legs, so she was then sent to a larger hospital where she was diagnosed with acute leukemia. The treatment costed 300,000 yuan, but She Shiyou didn't have such a large amount of money. He started to ask friends and relatives for money. Retired old women from her village really loved She Yan and donated their pension but the money collected was very far below the amount of money required. He decided to sell his house but it wasn't worth much, so the money received couldn't be enough either. She Yan noticed that her father was very worried, and said to him that she wanted to die. She signed for her illiterate father writing in her medical record: "Voluntarily give up treatment". Then they returned to their house and She Yan, who never asked anything to her father, asked for new clothes and also asked to take a photo with her father wearing her new clothes: her father could remember her by seeing that photo.

Then a reporter whose name was Fu Yan (Chinese: 傅艳), working at "Chengdu Evening News" (Chinese: "成都晚报"), learned from the hospital about her situation and wrote a report about her story. The story spread throughout the city of Chengdu as well as on the internet, and many people from all over China and even the world started donating in order to save her life. Donations reached 560,000 yuan after just ten days. She Yan could then afford the treatment and was admitted to Chengdu's Municipal Children's Hospital (Chinese: 成都市儿童医院).

From birth to death, She Yan didn't receive motherly care. When Dr. Xu Ming once said "She Yan, be my daughter!" She Yan's eyes flashed and tears welled up. The next day, when Dr. Xu Ming arrived at her bedside, She Yan shyly called out, "Mom Xu." Xu Ming was stunned at first, then a bright smile spread across her face, and she replied sweetly, "My dear daughter". Many residents visited the hospital, and online, countless netizens worried about this poor child. During chemotherapy, She Yan lost all her hair and was about to die nine times.

On August 22, 2005, She Yan was very hungry since she was unable to eat any food because of gastrointestinal bleeding and relied on intravenous feeding. She opened a pack of instant noodles and ate some of it; this worsened the bleeding and her abdominal pain was so unbearable that she asked to die. She died on the same day.

Her tomb is located in the suburbs of Chengdu, inside Jinsha cemetery (No. 15, Row 10, North Section 2, Chunhuiyuan, Chengdu Jinsha Cemetery - Chinese: 成都东郊大安桥成都金沙陵园春晖苑北二区10排15号.).

A smiling photo of her is placed at her grave and the inscription on the tombstone reads:

I've been here, I'm very well-behaved...

Here lies an eight-year-old girl, She Yan, she was made and abandoned right after birth, and was adopted by a kindhearted mountain villager, She Shiyou. After she got leukemia at the age of eight, tens of thousands of kindhearted people in Chengdu, across the country and around the world raised nearly 700,000 yuan for medical expenses in just 10 days... She felt the love of the humankind during her lifetime.

Rest in peace, little girl. Now that it has you, Heaven is more beautiful.

— Inscription on She Yan's tombstone

According to She Yan's last wishes, the remaining 540,000 yuan collected to save her life were used o save the life of other children suffering from leukemia.

== Accolades ==
This movie was awarded the following prizes:

- Remy Silver Award at the 53rd WorldFest-Houston International Film Festival
- Special invitation for outstanding Chinese-language Film at the Vancouver Chinese Film Festival
- New York Film Award for Best Director Feature Film and a nomination for Original Screenplay.

The movie was also shortlisted at the following film festivals:

- Cambodia Asian Film Festival
- Hollywood Art Film Awards for Best Film
- Luleå International Film Festival in Sweden

== See also ==
- Dying to Survive
