= Lost in the Stars (2022 film) =

- Theatrical release poster
- Chinese: 消失的她
- Literal meaning: She Who Disappeared
- Hanyu Pinyin: Xiāoshī De Tā
- Directed by: Cui Rui; Liu Xiang
- Screenplay by: Chen Sicheng; Gu Shuyi
- Based on: Piege Pour un Homme Seul by Robert Thomas; Trap for a Lonely Man by Alexey Korenev
- Produced by: Chen Sicheng
- Starring: Zhu Yilong; Ni Ni; Janice Man; Du Jiang
- Cinematography: Shan He
- Edited by: Tang Hongjia
- Music by: Hu Xiao'ou
- Production companies: Beijing Tianhua Huawen Motion Picture Investment Co.; Beijing Weimeng Chuangke Network Technology; Beijing Yitong Chuanqi Film Culture; Douyin Culture; Pearl River Film Media; Shanghai Taopiaopiao Film Culture
- Distributed by: China Media Capital
- Release dates: 25 December 2022 (Hainan International Film Festival); 22 June 2023 (China)
- Running time: 122 minutes
- Country: China
- Languages: Mandarin; Thai; English
- Box office: $486.2 million

Lost in the Stars (Chinese: 消失的她; lit. 'She Who Disappeared') is a 2022 Chinese mystery film directed by Cui Rui and Liu Xiang, and starring Zhu Yilong, Ni Ni, Janice Man, and Du Jiang.

The film is adapted from Aleksey Korenev's 1990 Soviet comedy film Trap for a Lonely Man and French playwright Robert Thomas' 1960 play Trap for a Lonely Man (Piege Pour un Homme Seul). It tells the story of businessman He Fei and his wife, Li Muzi, who disappears during an anniversary trip to Southeast Asia; the woman who reappears, claiming to be Li Muzi, is not his wife.

The film was released theatrically in China on 22 June 2023. It received generally positive reviews from critics.

The plot bears resemblance to the 2019 Wang Nuannuan case, where her husband pushed Wang off a cliff in order to inherit her assets and clear gambling debts.

== Plot ==
He Fei and his wife Li Muzi are celebrating the first anniversary of their marriage at an island resort in the fictional Southeast Asian nation of Barlandia. When Muzi goes missing, the local police refuse to open an investigation, citing the lack of evidence of a crime. Two weeks later, He Fei angrily confronts the police and is thrown out of the station. However, a man named Officer Zheng, who is fluent in Chinese, expresses some sympathy towards him. He Fei wakes up the next day and finds an unknown woman in his room pretending to be Muzi. She possesses a fake passport with Muzi's name. He Fei summons Officer Zheng, only to find that photographs of Muzi on his phone have been replaced with photographs of the unknown woman. Moreover, the woman knows intimate personal details that only Muzi should know. He Fei goes to a book store to find surveillance footage of his wife, but the footage has been replaced to include the woman instead. At a bar, He Fei sees a news segment about a successful lawyer named Chen Mai, and hires her to prove that the unknown woman is not Muzi.

Chen Mai finds evidence that the unknown woman is part of a criminal group who steals the identities of wealthy men's wives. Chen Mai notices that a car is following her and He Fei around Barlandia. She leads He Fei to a hideout where they find further evidence of the group's identity theft activities. As they exit the hideout, they are pursued by a mercenary who tries to kill them with a shotgun, but they successfully escape. Chen Mai then tracks down the local photographer who took photographs of He Fei and Muzi. The photographer demands money in exchange for testifying to the police. He Fei pays the photographer. On the way to the police station, Chen Mai accuses He Fei of hiding something from her. He Fei fires Chen Mai and tries to exit her jeep with the photographer. A sniper who was following them shoots and kills the photographer. He Fei decides to leave and return to China, but the unknown woman confronts him in his resort's room. The woman hits her own head with a glass bottle, whereupon security guards enter the room and arrest He Fei.

He Fei wakes up strapped to a hospital bed while the unknown woman and a surgeon sign a form consenting for a lobotomy to be performed on him. After they leave, Chen Mai sneaks in disguised as a nurse. She explains that she has been framed for the murder of the photographer, and that her only goal is now to prove her own innocence by finding Muzi. Chen Mai accuses He Fei of knowing and concealing Muzi's location from her, and repeatedly demands to know the location in exchange for helping He Fei escape. He Fei finally relents and says that Muzi is at a lighthouse. Chen Mai leaves but He Fei is able to unstrap himself from the bed. He wanders through the corridors of the hospital. When he exits the hospital, he finds that it is a constructed set in the middle of an abandoned complex. He then stumbles upon a dressing room where he is confronted by Chen Mai, the unknown woman, Officer Zheng, the surgeon, and the mercenary with the shotgun. All of them are revealed to be professional actors. Moreover, the local photographer was also bribed to serve as an actor and his death was staged. The police show up and arrest He Fei. It is revealed that He Fei murdered Muzi while they were scuba diving to inherit her wealth upon discovering that Muzi was preparing to file for divorce. Chen Mai reveals herself to be Shen Man, Muzi's friend who works as the director of a theatre troupe in New York. After Muzi failed to contact her, Shen Man flew to Barlandia. Shen Man asks her troupe to join her in Barlandia to trick He Fei into divulging Muzi's location. The drowned body of Muzi is subsequently found in an underwater cage near the lighthouse. She is found with an ultrasound scan of their baby. Shen Man tells He Fei that Muzi was not going to divorce because of the pregnancy. Before Shen leaves for New York, she visits He Fei in prison and tells He Fei that by killing his wife, he also killed his child.

The movie ends with a title card explaining that He Fei is sentenced to death and executed immediately. Shen Man is sentenced to 30 days' detention for causing chaos, burglary and illegal arrest. The rest of the theatre troupe is deported and barred from re-entering Barlandia.

== Cast ==
- Zhu Yilong as He Fei
- Ni Ni as Chen Mai / Shen Man
- Janice Man as "Li Muzi" / Jane
- Du Jiang as Zheng Chen
- Kay Huang as Li Muzi

== Soundtrack ==
Released on 22 June 2023
No.	Title	Lyrics	Music	Artist	Length
1.	"Cage" (籠)	Tang Tian (By Brave Music)	Qian Lei (By Brave Music)	Zhang Bichen	4:40

== Release ==
The film premiered at the Hainan International Film Festival on 25 December 2022. It was released theatrically in China on 22 June 2023. It received a North American release on 7 July 2023, and was released globally on Netflix on 1 October 2023.

== Reception ==
=== Box office ===
Lost in the Stars earned CN¥146 million on its first day of release. Over its four-day opening weekend (extended due to the Dragon Boat Festival holiday taking place on Thursday), it earned CN¥968 million.

It ultimately grossed $486.2 million (more than CN¥3 billion) worldwide, making it the fourth-highest grossing Chinese film of 2023.

=== Critical response ===
On the review aggregator website Rotten Tomatoes, 100% of 6 critics' reviews are positive, with an average rating of 7.6/10. For The Guardian, Leslie Felperin gave it three out of five stars, writing, "Although the 180-degree plot pivots start to get a little ridiculous by the end, the script zips along with such gleeful mischievousness that the ride is too fun to resist." Whang Lee Ying of The Straits Times rated it four out of five stars, calling it "nothing if not Hitchcockian with its doppelganger and femme fatale".

=== Accolades ===
Date	Awards	Nominee	Results	Ref.
9 April 2023	2022–2023 Movie Channel M List Annual Focus Movies	Lost in the Stars	Won	
3 April 2023	The 13th Beijing International Film Festival "Tiantan Award"	Lost in the Stars	Nominated	
11 June 2023	2023 Weibo Movie Night "(Most Anticipated) Movies of the Year"	Lost in the Stars	Won	
