= Wen Muye =

Chinese film director (born 1985)

- 文牧野
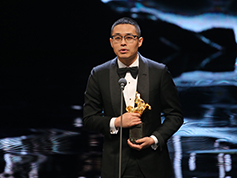
- Wen at the 55th Golden Horse Awards
- Born: 14 February 1985 (age 41); Changchun, Jilin, China
- Education: Northeast Normal University; Beijing Film Academy
- Occupation: Film director
- Years active: 2010–present

Wen Muye (Chinese: 文牧野; pinyin: Wén Mùyě; born 14 February 1985) is a Chinese film director best known for the films Dying to Survive (2018), Nice View (2022), and Once Upon a Time in the Middle East (2026).

== Early life and education ==
Wen was born in Changchun, Jilin, on 14 February 1985. He attended Northeast Normal University, graduating in 2008. He went on to receive his master's degree from Beijing Film Academy in 2014 under the supervision of renowned film director Tian Zhuangzhuang.

== Career ==
Wen rose to fame after directing Dying to Survive (2019), a comedy-drama film earned critical acclaim and received numerous awards and honors, such as Best Feature Film and Best New Director at the 55th Golden Horse Awards, Best Directorial Debut at the 32nd Golden Rooster Awards, Outstanding Film at the 35th Hundred Flowers Awards, and Best Director at the 26th Beijing College Student Film Festival.

== Filmography ==
=== As director ===
Year	English title	Chinese title	Co-directors	Notes
2015	Cities in Love	恋爱中的城市	Dong Runnian/ Han Yi/ Fu Tianyu/ Ji Jiatong	
2018	Dying to Survive	我不是药神		
2019	My People, My Country	我和我的祖国	Chen Kaige/ Zhang Yibai/ Guan Hu/ Xue Xiaolu/ Xu Zheng/ Ning Hao	
2022	Nice View	奇迹·笨小孩		
2026	Once Upon a Time in the Middle East	欢迎来龙餐馆		Selected as the Chinese entry for Best International Feature Film at the Oscars

== Awards and nominations ==
Year	Nominated work	Award	Result	Ref.
Hundred Flowers Film Awards
35th Hundred Flowers Awards (2020)	Dying to Survive	Best Picture	Nominated	
35th Hundred Flowers Awards (2020)	Dying to Survive	Best Newcomer	Nominated	
35th Hundred Flowers Awards (2020)	Dying to Survive	Best Writing	Nominated	
35th Hundred Flowers Awards (2020)	Dying to Survive	Outstanding Film	Won	
35th Hundred Flowers Awards (2020)	My People, My Country	Best Director	Nominated	
36th Hundred Flowers Awards (2022)	Nice View	Best Picture	Nominated	
36th Hundred Flowers Awards (2022)	Nice View	Best Director	Won	
Golden Rooster Awards
32nd Golden Rooster Awards (2019)	Dying to Survive	Best Picture	Nominated	
32nd Golden Rooster Awards (2019)	Dying to Survive	Best Directorial Debut	Won	
32nd Golden Rooster Awards (2019)	Dying to Survive	Best Writing	Nominated	
Hong Kong Film Awards
38th Hong Kong Film Awards (2019)	Dying to Survive	Best Film from Mainland and Taiwan	Won	
Golden Horse Awards
55th Golden Horse Awards (2018)	Dying to Survive	Best Feature Film	Nominated	
55th Golden Horse Awards (2018)	Dying to Survive	Best New Director	Won	
55th Golden Horse Awards (2018)	Dying to Survive	Best Original Screenplay	Won	
Beijing College Student Film Festival
26th Beijing College Student Film Festival (2019)	Dying to Survive	Best Director	Won	
26th Beijing College Student Film Festival (2019)	Dying to Survive	Best Film	Nominated	
Huading Awards
25th Huading Awards (2019)	Dying to Survive	Best Director	Won	
Changchun Film Festival
14th Changchun Film Festival (2018)	Dying to Survive	Best Film	Won	
14th Changchun Film Festival (2018)	Dying to Survive	Best Screenplay	Won	
Hainan Island International Film Festival
1st Hainan Island International Film Festival (2018)	Dying to Survive	Best Director	Won	
1st Hainan Island International Film Festival (2018)	Dying to Survive	Best Film	Won	
Shanghai Film Critics Awards
27th Shanghai Film Critics Awards (2019)	Dying to Survive	Top Ten Films of the Year	Won	
27th Shanghai Film Critics Awards (2019)	Dying to Survive	Best New Screenwriter	Won	
27th Shanghai Film Critics Awards (2019)	Dying to Survive	Best Directorial Debut	Won	
China Film Director Guild
10th China Film Director Guild Annunl Meeting (2018)	Dying to Survive	Film of the Year	Won	
10th China Film Director Guild Annunl Meeting (2018)	Dying to Survive	Young Director of the Year	Won	
10th China Film Director Guild Annunl Meeting (2018)	Dying to Survive	Screenwriter of the Year	Nominated	
10th China Film Director Guild Annunl Meeting (2018)	Dying to Survive	Director of the Year	Nominated	
Asian Film Awards
13th Asian Film Awards (2019)	Dying to Survive	Best Film	Nominated	
13th Asian Film Awards (2019)	Dying to Survive	Best Screenplay	Nominated	
