= Hero (2022 Chinese film) =

- Theatrical release poster
- Traditional Chinese: 世間有她
- Simplified Chinese: 世间有她
- Literal meaning: This world has her
- Hanyu Pinyin: Shìjiān yǒu tā
- Directed by: Sylvia Chang; Li Shaohong; Joan Chen
- Written by: Sylvia Chang; Joan Chen; Gao Xuan; Ren Baoru
- Produced by: Dong Wenjie
- Starring: Zhou Xun; Sammi Cheng
- Cinematography: S.K. Yip; Jonathan Lele Young; Nianping Zeng
- Edited by: Hoi Wong; Shirley Yip; Xiaolin Zhou
- Music by: Jiawei Liao; Shigeru Umebayashi; Ngai Lun Wong; Janet Yung
- Production companies: Asia Pacific Future Television (Beijing) Co., Ltd. Beijing Jueyinglian Cultural Media Co., Ltd. Tao Piao Piao
- Release date: 9 September 2022 (China)
- Running time: 116 minutes
- Country: China
- Languages: Mandarin; Cantonese
- Box office: US$8.4 million

Hero (Chinese: 世间有她), formerly known as Her Story, is a 2022 Chinese drama anthology film directed by Sylvia Chang, Li Shaohong and Joan Chen, and starring Zhou Xun and Sammi Cheng. Other cast consists of Jackson Yee, Xu Di, Stephen Fung, Bai Ke, Huang Miyi, and Nina Paw. The film follows the story of three ordinary women's love lives, careers and families during the COVID-19 pandemic. Hero was theatrically released on 9 September 2022 in China.

== Plot ==
At the beginning of 2020, when the COVID-19 pandemic struck Wuhan, a mother-in-law and daughter-in-law—Shen Yue and Li Ju—both contract the virus and are forced to live under the same roof with only each other for company. As they navigate their illness, they must also confront the age-old tensions between mother- and daughter-in-law.

At the onset of the pandemic, a young couple in love finds themselves separated. Li Zhaohua is in Wuhan and, unfortunately, becomes infected, while his girlfriend, Zhou Xiaolu, is in Beijing. Due to the lockdown and strict pandemic measures, she is unable to return to care for him. The two can only maintain their relationship through frequent video calls each day.

Meanwhile, Leung Ching-si and her husband, Ho Tat-yan, juggle their marriage, careers, and two children. When the crisis suddenly strikes, the underlying tensions in their marriage resurface. Leung, overwhelmed by disappointment in her husband, reaches a breaking point, while Ho, despite his many sacrifices for the family, feels misunderstood and unappreciated. Their conflicts escalate as they struggle to find balance amidst the chaos of the pandemic.

== Cast ==
- Zhou Xun as Shen Yue
- Sammi Cheng as Leung Ching-si
- Jackson Yee as Li Zhaohua
- Stephen Fung as Ho Tat-yan
- Xu Di as Li Ju
- Batu as Zhang Yimin
- Bai Ke as Yang Kai
- Huang Miyi as Zhou Xiaolu
- Nina Paw as Ching-si's mother
- Zhu Yafen as Xiaolu's great-aunt
- Su Xiaoming as Ming
- Ma Xinmo as Li Jiaqi (Jiajia)

== Soundtrack ==
No.	Title	Lyrics	Music	歌手	Length
1.	"I'm Sorry I Forgot I Love You (对不起我忘了我爱你)" (Interlude)	Zhang Aijia	Weng Weiying/ Huang Ailun	Sammi Cheng/ Stephen Fung
2.	"Her Story (世间有她)" (Promotional song)			Hu Xia

== Release ==
Hero premiered in China on 9 September 2022.

== Reception ==
On Douban, a major Chinese media rating site, the film has scored 5.5 out of 10.
