= Too Cool to Kill =

- Chinese theatrical release poster
- Traditional Chinese: 這個殺手不太冷靜
- Simplified Chinese: 这个杀手不太冷静
- Literal meaning: This killer isn't too cool-headed
- Hanyu Pinyin: Zhè ge Shāshǒu Bú Tài Lěngjìng
- Directed by: Xing Wenxiong
- Written by: Xing Wenxiong
- Based on: The Magic Hour by Kōki Mitani
- Produced by: Yan Fei; Peng Damo
- Starring: Ma Li; Wei Xiang
- Production company: Mahua FunAge
- Distributed by: Mahua FunAge
- Release date: 1 February 2022
- Running time: 109 minutes
- Country: China
- Language: Chinese
- Box office: $413 million

Too Cool to Kill is a 2022 Chinese action comedy film, based on the 2008 Japanese film The Magic Hour. It stars Wei Xiang as an amateur actor who is invited to play a leading role in a film and ends up drawn into a dangerous situation. It was released in China on 1 February 2022 (Chinese New Year) and in the United States and Canada on 18 February 2022. It is Xing Wenxiong's feature film directorial debut.

== Plot ==
Harvey is a gang leader who a hitman named Karl sought to assassinate, but both were injured in the demolition of a building; Karl was crippled in the explosion and Harvey was injured by his astray bullet. While seeing a supposed employee in the hospital (not knowing it's his attempted assassin), Harvey receives news that his injury may not have been caused by flying debris from the building but instead by gunshot; the evidence provided being in the form of a shell casing with "Karl" engraved on it. Enraged, he vowed to seek out the hitman Karl. Meanwhile, Mi Lan's brother directed a film that failed in the box office, which meant Harvey lost money on his investment, prompting him to threaten said director. Harvey then gets startled by the popping of a balloon, mistakenly assuming Karl was in the vicinity. Mi Lan then uses this to say she knows "Karl" and can bring him to Harvey.

This brings amateur actor Wei Chenggong into the picture, as Mi Lan sees him as a potential recruit to "play the role of a hitman", which draws him into an unknowingly risky environment that could possibly have the group killed by Harvey and his gang, the whole while Wei thinking it's a film set.

== Cast ==
- Ma Li as Mi Lan
- Wei Xiang as Wei Chenggong
- Chen Minghao as Harvey
- Zhou Dayong as Jimmy
- Huang Cailun as Mi Le
- Ai Lun as Karl

== Production ==
Too Cool to Kill is an adaptation of Kōki Mitani's 2008 Japanese film The Magic Hour.

It was written and directed by Xing Wenxiong (邢文雄), one of the writers of My People, My Homeland. It is Xing's feature film directorial debut. It was produced by Yan Fei (闫非) and Peng Damo (彭大魔). Filming began on 23 June 2021, and on the same day it was announced that the film would be released on Chinese New Year 2022.

For one scene in the film, Wei Xiang had to speak Italian, a language which he had never studied and felt stressed about speaking, according to costar Zhou Dayong. Wei said in an interview that the crew gave him a translator, who spoke to him after shooting and helped him memorize the lines.

== Release ==
The film was released in China on 1 February 2022 (Chinese New Year), and it was released in a limited number of cities in the United States and Canada on 18 February 2022 by distributor Well Go USA. It was the only pure comedy scheduled for release on Chinese New Year 2022.

== Reception ==
The film has been one of the most successful of the 2022 Chinese New Year releases. The film grossed $217 million in its first six days, including $110.5 million in its opening weekend. It received positive reviews from advance screening audiences, and on the day of its release, it got an average rating of 9.2 on Maoyan. On Rotten Tomatoes, the film received a score of 78% from audiences.
