= Better Days (2019 film) =

2019 Chinese-Hong Kong film by Derek Tsang

- Theatrical release poster
- Chinese: 少年的你
- Literal meaning: The Youthful You
- Hanyu Pinyin: shàonián de nǐ
- Directed by: Derek Tsang
- Written by: Lam Wing Sum; Li Yuan; Xu Yimeng
- Based on: In His Youth, In Her Beauty by Jiu Yuexi
- Produced by: Xu Yuezhen
- Starring: Zhou Dongyu; Jackson Yee
- Cinematography: Yu Jing-Pin
- Edited by: Zhang Yibo
- Music by: Varqa Buehrer
- Production companies: Henan Film Group; China Wit Media; Tianijn Xiron Entertainment; We Pictures; Shooting Pictures
- Distributed by: Lian Rui Pictures; Shanghai Taopiaopiao Film Culture; Tianjin Maoyan Weying Media; Huaxia Film Distribution; Golden Village Pictures
- Release date: October 25, 2019
- Running time: 135 minutes
- Countries: China; Hong Kong
- Language: Mandarin
- Box office: US$231.5 million

Better Days (Chinese: 少年的你; pinyin: Shàonián de nǐ) is a 2019 drama film directed by Derek Tsang and written by Lam Wing Sum, Li Yuan and Xu Yimeng. Based on the Chinese young adult novel In His Youth, In Her Beauty by Jiu Yuexi, the film stars Zhou Dongyu and Jackson Yee, and follows a high school girl struggling with severe bullying and the pressure of upcoming college entrance exams, whose life becomes intertwined with that of a teenage street thug.

Better Days was released on 25 October 2019 in China. One of the most highly anticipated Chinese films in 2019 due to its lead actors' immense popularity, the film became a pop culture phenomenon in China as well as a box office hit, grossing a total of US$230.1 million. It was also a critical success, and was nominated for Best International Feature Film at the 93rd Academy Awards, as the official entry from Hong Kong.

== Plot ==
After her classmate, Hu Xiaodie, commits suicide because of school bullying, Chen Nian finds herself as the new victim of the "queen bee" and vicious school bully, Wei Lai, along with her friends. When Chen Nian witnesses teenage thug Liu Beishan, also known as "Xiao Bei," being assaulted by rival thugs, she attempts to call the police but is attacked by the thugs as well. They force her to kiss Xiao Bei as a way to humiliate them.

Chen Nian’s school bullies grow fiercer, physically attacking her and spreading rumors about her family. Police detectives Zheng Ye and Lao Yang investigate Hu Xiaodie’s death and reveal that Chen Nian has reported being bullied. As a consequence, Wei Lai and her friends are suspended from school. Enraged, the three expelled bullies chase Chen Nian one day with boxcutters and a cage of rats. With nowhere else to turn, she seeks refuge at Xiao Bei’s house and asks him to protect her while she studies for the college entrance exam. He agrees and accompanies her to and from school each day, and during this time, the two grow close.

Xiao Bei is picked to be in a lineup and ends up stuck at the police station. Without his protection, Chen Nian is caught by the bullies; they cut her hair, beat her, and strip her, all while filming. When Xiao Bei is finally released, he rushes home to find a bleeding Chen Nian in tatters. He assists her in shaving her head and shaves his own in solidarity.

On the day of the exam, heavy rain causes a landslide. While clearing the landslide, Wei Lai's body is discovered. After the first day of the two-day exam, the detectives question Chen Nian as the main suspect in Wei Lai’s murder. They ask her why she didn’t come to them after the video of her was filmed; she states that she simply wants to take her exam and move away to Beijing for college.

As she's being escorted home by police, Xiao Bei grabs Chen Nian, and they run. He explains that the only way for her to go to college is if he takes the blame for Wei Lai's death. Reluctantly, Chen Nian agrees, and he acts as though he's assaulting her, leading to his arrest.

A flashback reveals Wei Lai begging Chen Nian not to report the video to the police. When Chen Nian pushes her in anger after she persists, Wei Lai falls down the stairs, hitting her head and dying. In the present, Chen Nian and Xiao Bei are interrogated but maintain that the only time they had met was when Xiao Bei attacked Chen Nian.

After Chen Nian receives her exam score, the detective informs her that Xiao Bei has been sentenced to death. Distraught, Chen Nian admits her involvement in the crime. The detective reveals that he lied to her to get her to confess, as the sentence would be lighter for both of them. He takes her to see Xiao Bei, and they agree to accept the lighter sentences; both end up in jail.

A few years later, Chen Nian is a teacher. She notices a distressed child, and they walk home together, closely followed by Xiao Bei. Screens explain the policies enacted by the Chinese government since the incident to prevent bullying in schools and impose stricter punishments on school bullies. Finally, there's a plea for everyone to take responsibility for the youth and their safety.

== Cast ==
- Zhou Dongyu as Chen Nian. The female protagonist, a 12th grader who gets bullied by a group of girls led by Wei Lai after being interrogated by the police regarding Hu Xiaodie's suicide. She later becomes close to Xiao Bei, insisting on making their future better together.
- Jackson Yee as Liu Beishan (aka "Xiao Bei"). The male protagonist who starts off as a street thug but ends up protecting Chen Nian from bullies and falling in love with her in their later encounters. He also takes the blame for several crimes in order to free Chen Nian of criminal charges.
- Yin Fang as Zheng Ye. A young police detective who plays a major role in finding out the bullies and tries to help Chen Nian.
- Huang Jue as Lao Yang. A member of the police department, who is like a mentor to Zheng Ye and provides him advice.
- Wu Yue as Chen Nian's mother. She is a single mother, who used to sell beauty products which caused skin damage since she didn’t have any other choice in order to save money for her and her daughter’s future.
- Zhou Ye as Wei Lai. The pretty and "sweet" popular girl hailing from a rich family and the main bully who had led Hu Xiaodie to her death and wanted Chen Nian to commit suicide by doing wrong to her.
- Zhang Xinyi as Xu Miao. A bystander who used to help Wei Lai in bullying to avoid experiencing it herself, later takes Chen Nian’s help.
- Liu Ran as Luo Ting. The bystander who used to do most of the hurting to the victims on Wei Lei’s command.
- Xie Xintong as Wang Li. A member of the police department, used to have a negative opinion on Chen Nian, later accepting Zheng Ye’s opinion.
- Zhang Yifan as Hu Xiaodie. The victim who used to get bullied by Wei Lei and her friends. She had jumped off from the highest storey of the school and committed suicide.
- Zhao Runnan as Da Kang. Xiao Bei's friend.
- Zhang Yao as Li Xiang. A fellow victim along with Chen Nian who used to try and cheer her up by reminding her of the dreams she had set on reaching Beijing after the examination.

== Soundtrack ==
=== Music with lyrics ===
No.	Title	Lyrics	Music	Singer(s)	Length
1.	"We are Well (我们很好)" (Opening theme)	Ge Dawei	JJ Lin	JJ Lin	4:28
2.	"Thoughts (念想)" (Interlude)	Wang Zi	Wang Zi	Jackson Yee	4:13
3.	"Fly" (Ending theme)	Ellen Joyce Loo, Wu Tsing-fong	Ellen Joyce Loo	Yoyo Sham	3:52

=== Instrumental music ===
No.	Title	Length
1.	"Better Days (少年的你)"	1:10
2.	"Wild Animals (野兽)"	2:00
3.	"Examination (高考)"	1:51
4.	"A Promise (一个约定)"	4:15
5.	"Class Photo (毕业照)"	3:40
6.	"A Good Person (好人)"	1:16
7.	"Let Me Go (让我走)"	3:46
8.	"You Owe Me Once (欠我一次)"	4:52
9.	"A Drop in the Ocean (汪洋一滴)"	2:19
10.	"Torn to Shreds (破碎)"	2:40

== Production ==
Better Days is adapted from Jiu Yuexi's novel In His Youth, In Her Beauty.

Production started in July 2018 and ended on September 10, 2018. Most of the film was shot on location in Chongqing.

== Release ==
Better Days was released on October 25, 2019, in China. It was released by Well Go USA Entertainment in Mandarin with English subtitles in selected theaters in the United States and Canada.

The film was pulled from the Berlin Festival's Generation section.

=== Critical reception ===
On Rotten Tomatoes the film has an approval rating of 97% based on reviews from 31 critics, with an average rating of 8.3/10. On Metacritic, the film has a weighted average score of 83 out of 100 based on 5 critic reviews, indicating "universal acclaim". The film also received a rating of 8.4/10 on Chinese film rating cite Douban and a 9.4/10 score on Chinese ticketing site Maoyan. The film topped the list of MovieWeb's Best Chinese Movies of the 2010s.

Cary Darling of the Houston Chronicle stated in 2019 that it was "one of the best films of the year" and that it "deserves a wide audience".

=== Box office ===
Better Days grossed more than US$80 million on its opening weekend in China. The film grossed more than 1.29 billion yuan (about US$184 million) in only 15 days in China.

== Accolades ==
The film won the Snow Leopard Special Jury Award at the 6th Asian World Film Festival in Los Angeles in March 2021.

Year	Award	Category	Nominated work	Result	Notes
2020	26th Hong Kong Film Critics Society Award	Best Film	Better Days	Nominated	
2020	26th Hong Kong Film Critics Society Award	Recommended Film Award	Better Days	Won	
2020	26th Hong Kong Film Critics Society Award	Best Screenplay	Lam Wing Sum, Li Yuan, Xu Yimeng	Nominated	
2020	26th Hong Kong Film Critics Society Award	Best Actor	Jackson Yee	Nominated	
2020	26th Hong Kong Film Critics Society Award	Best Actress	Zhou Dongyu	Nominated	
2020	26th Hong Kong Film Critics Society Award	Best Director	Derek Tsang	Won	
2020	39th Hong Kong Film Awards	Best Director	Derek Tsang	Won	
2020	39th Hong Kong Film Awards	Best Film	Better Days	Won	
2020	39th Hong Kong Film Awards	Best Actor	Jackson Yee	Nominated	
2020	39th Hong Kong Film Awards	Best New Performer	Jackson Yee	Won	
2020	39th Hong Kong Film Awards	Best Actress	Zhou Dongyu	Won	
2020	39th Hong Kong Film Awards	Best Cinematography	Yu Jing-Pin	Won	
2020	39th Hong Kong Film Awards	Best Editing	Zhang Yibo	Nominated	
2020	39th Hong Kong Film Awards	Best Art Direction	Liang Honghu	Nominated	
2020	39th Hong Kong Film Awards	Best Costume Make Up Design	Dora Ng	Won	
2020	39th Hong Kong Film Awards	Best Original Film Song	"Fly"	Won	
2020	39th Hong Kong Film Awards	Best Original Film Score	Varqa Buehrer	Nominated	
2020	39th Hong Kong Film Awards	Best Screenplay	Lam Wing Sum, Li Yuan, Xu Yimeng	Won	
2020	35th Hundred Flower Awards	Best Actress	Zhou Dongyu	Won	
2020	35th Hundred Flower Awards	Best Newcomer	Jackson Yee	Won	
2020	35th Hundred Flower Awards	Best Film	Better Days	Nominated	
2020	35th Hundred Flower Awards	Best Director	Derek Tsang	Nominated	
2020	35th Hundred Flower Awards	Best Screenplay	Lam Wing Sum, Li Yuan, Xu Yimeng	Nominated	
2020	35th Hundred Flower Awards	Best Supporting Actress	Wu Yue	Nominated	
2020	Far East Film Festival	Golden Mulberry	Better Days	Won	
2020	Far East Film Festival	Black Mulberry	Better Days	Won	
2020	33rd Golden Rooster Awards	Best Actress	Zhou Dongyu	Won	
2020	33rd Golden Rooster Awards	Best Editing	Zhang Yibo	Won	
2020	33rd Golden Rooster Awards	Best Film	Better Days	Nominated	
2020	33rd Golden Rooster Awards	Best Director	Derek Tsang	Nominated	
2020	33rd Golden Rooster Awards	Best Screenplay	Lam Wing Sum, Li Yuan, Xu Yimeng	Nominated	
2020	33rd Golden Rooster Awards	Best Actor	Jackson Yee	Nominated	
2020	33rd Golden Rooster Awards	Best Supporting Actor	Huang Jue	Nominated	
2020	33rd Golden Rooster Awards	Best Supporting Actress	Zhou Ye	Nominated	
2020	33rd Golden Rooster Awards	Best Cinematography	Yu Jing-Pin	Nominated	
2020	33rd Golden Rooster Awards	Best Music	Varqa Buehrer	Nominated	
2020	33rd Golden Rooster Awards	Best Sound	Huang Zhen	Nominated	
2020	93rd Academy Awards	Best International Feature Film	Derek Tsang	Nominated	
2020	15th Osaka Asian Film Festival	Audience Award	Better Days	Won	

== See also ==
- List of submissions to the 93rd Academy Awards for Best International Feature Film
- List of Hong Kong submissions for the Academy Award for Best International Feature Film
