= Full River Red =

2023 film directed by Zhang Yimou

- Theatrical release poster
- Traditional Chinese: 滿江紅
- Simplified Chinese: 满江红
- Literal meaning: the whole river red
- Hanyu Pinyin: mǎnjiānghóng
- Directed by: Zhang Yimou
- Written by: Zhang Yimou; Chen Yu
- Produced by: Yu Liang
- Starring: Shen Teng; Jackson Yee; Zhang Yi; Lei Jiayin; Yue Yunpeng
- Cinematography: Zhao Xiaoding
- Edited by: Li Yongyi
- Music by: Han Hong
- Production company: Huanxi Media
- Distributed by: Tianjin Maoyan Weiying Culture Media; China Film Co., Ltd.
- Release date: January 22, 2023 (China)
- Running time: 159 minutes
- Country: China
- Language: Mandarin
- Budget: CN¥500 million (est. US$72.7 million)
- Box office: US$673.6 million

Full River Red (Chinese: 满江红) is a 2023 period film directed by Zhang Yimou. It stars Shen Teng and Jackson Yee, alongside Zhang Yi, Lei Jiayin and Yue Yunpeng. The film was released in theaters in China on January 22, 2023, the same day as the Chinese New Year Day. It is the highest grossing Chinese film in 2023.

Full River Red is based on a meeting between the Southern Song Dynasty and the Jin Dynasty. It tells the story of a group of righteous men who sacrificed their lives to eradicate evil. Among them, the characters Zhang Da played by Shen Teng and Sun Jun played by Jackson Yee also have their own mysterious color, which makes people imagine endlessly.

== Plot ==
The film is a fictional origin story of the poem Full River Red 滿江紅 attributed to General Yue Fei. It is set four years after Yue Fei's death (around 1146). The film begins with the murder of the Jin envoy at the Song Prime Minister/Grand Chancellor Qin Hui's residence. The guards for the envoy are rounded up and summarily executed. Zhang Da, one of the guards, is about to be executed but he claims to know something about an item found at the murder scene. He is taken before the Prime Minister. He is given two hours to find a missing letter. Qin Hui is concerned that the letter will portray him as a traitor. Sun Jun the deputy commander is assigned to assist Zhang Da. Sun Jun is Zhang Da's uncle but despises him. Qin Hui instructs He Li, his general manager, that both Zhang and Sun are to be killed whether they find the letter or not.

Zhang and Sun follow various leads, but the volatile Sun Jun kills most of the potential witnesses, including the Jin interpreter. They are about to be executed by the Prime Minister but are spared when Zhang Da suggests to the Prime Minister that they can cover up the incident by denying that the Jin envoy was ever there. Zhang Da and Sun are given another chance to find another lead, or else they will be held responsible.

Zhang Da reasoned that the suspect must have friends in the kitchen. Zhang speaks to his friend Liu Xi. Liu informs him that he plans to kill He Li, the Prime Minister's second and will set off fireworks when he is done. Liu's attempt fails and he is captured. He Li said Liu was carrying a blank letter with him. He Li suspects Zhang Da, Sun Jun, and Wu Yichen, another official. They are forced to each stab Liu Xi to prove their loyalty. Zhang, Sun, and Wu are subsequently released. After they are released Wu Yichen asks Sun Jun for the letter. He had noticed that the blank was a decoy and the real letter was hidden under the inkpot on the desk and that Sun had taken it. The letter was written in the Jin language and they bring Zither a courtesan to interpret it. Zither interprets two lines and eats the letter. She said she will be killed once she interpreted the letter.

He Li finds out about the letter and Zither and arranges for Zither to speak to the Prime Minister about the contents of the letter. Zhang Da tells Wu that they will all be killed once Zither discloses the contents of the letter. Zhang convinces Wu to give Zither a dagger so she can use it to take the Prime Minister hostage. Zither uses the dagger to attempt to kill Qin but fails. They are all brought before Prime Minister Qin where He Li discloses that they knew about Zhang's plans to take the letter as a ploy to attempt to assassinate the Prime Minister. He Li identifies the dagger used as Wu's and kills him. He Li also knows that Sun was not part of the plan. Sun is instructed to torture Zhang while He Li attempts to find the contents of the letter from Zither. Sun finds out that Zhang was a soldier in General Yue Fei's army. Zither uses a ruse to kill He Li but is killed herself in the attempt. Zhang and Sun are held in custody awaiting execution while the Prime Minister plans to meet with the Jin. Zhang discloses that the last part of the plan involves Sun. Zhang will write the contents of the letter on the wall and they will lure the Prime Minister there to view the letter. The letter will reveal that the Prime Minister is a traitor so he will ensure that nobody will be in the room (cell). They will then overpower and kill Qin. Sun agrees. Qin attends the cell with one of his female attendants. He reads the wall contents and admits he plans to betray the Song to the Jin. When Qin attends the cell Zhang attempts to kill him but the female attendant manages to stab him. When Zhang is about to stab Qin, Sun stands in the way and is stabbed himself. Sun kills Zhang.

Prime Minister Qin rewards Sun with 1000 taels of silver and he is made the director of the Prime Minister's office. While Qin is preparing to meet with the Jin, Sun is allowed to see him alone. Sun overpowers the two female attendants but tells Qin he does not want to kill him. Instead, he knows that Qin was in the cell when General Yue Fei was executed and he wants to know what the General's final words were. To ensure the words are preserved he forces Qin to address his troop and recite the words which turn out to be the poem Full River Red. The soldiers are told to recite the poem repeatedly. After addressing the troops Qin retires from the balcony, he grabs Sun's knife and uses it to stab himself. One of Qin's generals enters and attacks Sun. Sun kills the general but is injured himself. he realizes that the Qin that was killed is actually a body double. He calls out the actual Qin. Sun questions why the body double knew the Full River Red poem. Qin reveals that he didn't even attend the cell of Yue Fei and only sent the body double. Sun allows Qin to live as he believes that this is a fate worse than death as Qin will be reviled by the people. Sun escapes with two of his subordinates.

== Cast ==
- Shen Teng as Zhang Da, a recruited soldier without rank
- Jackson Yee as Sun Jun, the deputy commander of the guard battalion
- Zhang Yi as He Li, the general manager of the grand chancellor bureau
- Lei Jiayin as Qin Hui, the grand chancellor
- Yue Yunpeng as Wu Yichun, the vice general manager of the grand chancellor bureau
- Wang Jiayi as Zither (Yao Qin), a dancing girl and Zhang Da's love
- Pan Binlong as Ding Sanwang, a Song soldier who dies
- Yu Ailei as Liu Xi, a Song dynasty peasant who is stabbed to death by He Li's mandate
- Guo Jingfei as Wang Biao, the commander of the guard battalion
- Wei Xiang as Hadeng, a Jin envoy who is killed
- Zhang Chi as Chen Liang, a Song soldier (left guard)
- Huang Yan as Hu Yong, a Song soldier (right guard) who is sentenced to death (beheading) as tribute to the Jin dynasty
- Xu Jingya as Lan Yu, Qin Hui’s mute and deaf maid.
- Jiang Pengyu as Lüzhu, Qin Hui’s mute and deaf maid.
- Lin Boyang as Liu Yan, a dancing girl who dies at the beginning
- Fei Fan as Qingmei, a dancing girl who dies
- Ren Sinuo as Tao Yatou, Liu Xi's daughter
- Chen Yongsheng as a Song soldier
- Zhang Yinan as Chen Xi, Song dynasty secretary

=== Special appearance ===
- Ou Hao as Zheng Wan, a Song soldier

== Production ==
=== Development ===
The title is from one of the most famous poems Man Jiang Hong attributed to Yue Fei. Yue Fei was a military general of the Southern Song Dynasty (1127–1279). He is a symbol of patriotism and loyalty to his country. However, Yue Fei was framed and executed by the Song emperor Zhao Gou along with Prime Minister Qin Hui. Although the poem is attributed to Yue Fei, there are theories that Yue Fei did not actually write it. Some even say that the poem was written in a different time period (e.g. after the Song dynasty), citing the fact that Helan mountains and Xiongnu are mentioned.

The poem Man Jiang Hong is recited during film by Qin Hui's double in front of the Song army.

Some characters (such as He Li) are based on the novel General Yue Fei, written by Qian Cai during the Qing dynasty. Some characters also share names with historical people from other time periods such as Lan Yu, a general who was executed by Zhu Yuanzhang during the early Ming dynasty, and Lüzhu, an ancient Chinese singer.

The movie's slogan says, "Enough suspense, laugh to the end." At the beginning of creation, Chen Yu made it clear that this was a "suspense film" with elements of comedy, but it was not a combination of suspense and comedy. In the current film market, he regarded it as An exploration and attempt of "new mainstream movies".

=== Filming ===
The film officially announced that the filming began on June 26, 2022. The filming took place in Taiyuan, Shanxi. It finished filming in August 2022.

== Release ==
The film released the first trailer on December 27, 2022. On the same day, it also announced that the film was scheduled for release on January 22, 2023 in CINITY, IMAX, Dolby Vision and other formats. On December 29, 2022, the film released the list of full cast. On January 5, 2023, it released the character names of full cast.

== Reception ==
=== Box office ===
The film made US$60 million on its opening day and US$181 million in its first three days, coming in behind The Wandering Earth 2. In just 8 days, the film had made over US$465 million.

As of March 18, 2023, the film is China's sixth-highest-grossing box office entry of all time, the highest grosser of 2023 Chinese New Year and the seventh-highest-grossing film of 2023.^{[15]}

=== Critical response ===
On January 14, 2024, the film won the title of Most Influential Film of the Year at the 2023 Weibo Night; in February, it was nominated for the Best Asian Chinese Film at the 42nd Hong Kong Film Awards.

On Rotten Tomatoes, the film has an approval rating of 95% based on 19 reviews. Metacritic, which uses a weighted average, assigned the film a score of 75 out of 100, based on 7 critics, indicating "generally favorable reviews".
