= Dying to Survive =

- Film poster
- Traditional Chinese: 我不是藥神
- Simplified Chinese: 我不是药神
- Literal meaning: I'm Not a Medicine God
- Hanyu Pinyin: Wǒ Bú Shì Yào Shén
- Directed by: Wen Muye
- Written by: Han Jianü; Zhong Wei; Wen Muye
- Produced by: Ning Hao; Xu Zheng
- Starring: Xu Zheng; Zhou Yiwei; Wang Chuanjun; Tan Zhuo; Zhang Yu; Yang Xinmin; Wang Yanhui
- Cinematography: Wang Boxue
- Edited by: Zhu Lin
- Music by: Huang Chao
- Production companies: Dirty Monkey Films Group; Beijing Joy Leader Culture Communication Co.; Huanxi Media Group; Beijing Jingxi Culture & Tourism Co.; Beijing Universe Cultural Development Co.; Beijing Talent International Film Co.
- Release dates: 19 June 2018 (Shanghai International Film Festival); 5 July 2018 (China)
- Running time: 117 minutes
- Country: China
- Language: Mandarin
- Budget: $10.9 million
- Box office: $453 million

Dying to Survive is a 2018 Chinese comedy-drama film directed by Wen Muye in his feature film debut. The film is based on the real-life story of Lu Yong (陆勇), a Chinese leukemia patient who smuggled cheap and generic cancer medicine from India for 1,000 Chinese cancer sufferers in 2004. Dying to Survive stars Xu Zheng in the lead role, who also co-produced the film with Ning Hao.

== Plot ==
An aphrodisiac peddler, Cheng Yong, is in financial trouble. His store has not been making profits for a long time and his father urgently needs a large sum of money for brain surgery.

One day a man wearing thick layers of surgical masks comes to his shop. He asks Cheng to bring a cheap drug from India in return for a large sum of money. Due to patent protection, the Swiss drug imatinib is very expensive and cannot be afforded by most leukemia patients in China. However, an inexpensive generic version of it is available in India.

Desperate for money, Cheng agrees to risk smuggling the drug into China. As more chronic myelogenous leukemia patients start to buy drugs from him, Cheng becomes rich. His motivation starts to change after he witnesses devastated patients whose families had been pushed into poverty by costly cancer treatments walk away with hope for the future.

At the same time, Chinese police notice the availability of the contraband imatinib and vow to crack down on the unlicensed generic drug, as the originator company Nova (reflecting Novartis in real life) sues the Indian government for infringing its patent.

== Cast ==
- Xu Zheng as Cheng Yong
- Tan Zhuo as Liu Sihui
- Wang Chuanjun as Lü Shouyi
- Wang Yanhui as Zhang Changlin
- Zhang Yu as Peng Hao
- Zhou Yiwei as Cao Bin
- Yang Xinmin as Pastor Liu
- Gong Beibi as Cao Ling, Cheng Yong's ex-wife and Cao Bin's elder sister
- Keith Shillitoe
- Jia Chenfei
- Li Naiwen
- Wang Jiajia as Lü Shouyi's wife
- Ning Hao
- Shahbaz Khan
- Nishith Avinash Shah as Translator

== Box office ==
On opening day, the film topped the Chinese box office and grossed $49.71 million, including preview screenings. By the end of its opening weekend, the film had grossed $199.58 million, the fourth biggest opening weekend ever in China. As of September 15, 2018, the film has grossed $453 million, becoming the year's third highest-grossing film at the Chinese box office.

== Critical reception ==
Pang-Chieh Ho of SupChina wrote that Dying to Survive "might be China's best movie of the year". She compared the film's social realist themes to Hollywood film Dallas Buyers Club, Indian film Dangal, and Chinese film Angels Wear White. Though Simon Abrams of RogerEbert.com also compared the film to Dallas Buyers Club, he gave Dying to Survive two out of four stars, criticizing the excessive focus on Cheng to the detriment of the film's message and at the expense of other characters. He stated that "I’d have an easier time accepting the trite, asked-and-answered conclusions... if [the director and co-writers] were more adept at tugging at viewers' heart-strings."

== Impact ==
The film sparked debate about the cost of healthcare in China. Chinese Premier Li Keqiang cited the film in an appeal to regulators to "speed up price cuts for cancer drugs" and "reduce the burden on families".

== Accolades ==
Year	Award	Category	Recipients	Result
2018	55th Golden Horse Awards	Best Feature Film	Dying to Survive	Nominated
2018	55th Golden Horse Awards	Best Leading Actor	Xu Zheng	Won
2018	55th Golden Horse Awards	Best Supporting Actor	Zhang Yu	Nominated
2018	55th Golden Horse Awards	Best New Director	Wen Muye	Won
2018	55th Golden Horse Awards	Best Original Screenplay	Han Jianü, Zhong Wei and Wen Muye	Won
2018	55th Golden Horse Awards	Best Makeup & Costume Design	Li Miao	Nominated
2018	55th Golden Horse Awards	Best Film Editing	Jolin Zhu	Nominated
2018	14th Changchun Film Festival	Best Feature Film	Dying to Survive	Won
2018	14th Changchun Film Festival	Best Leading Actor	Xu Zheng	Won
2018	14th Changchun Film Festival	Best Screenplay	Han Jianv, Zhong Wei and Wen Muye	Won
2018	14th Changchun Film Festival	Best Supporting Actor	Wang Chuanjun	Won
2018	42nd Montreal World Film Festival	Best Screenplay	Han Jianv, Zhong Wei and Wen Muye	Won
2018	5th Silk Road International Film Festival	Best Feature Film	Dying to Survive	Won
2018	Hainan International Film Festival	Best Film	Dying to Survive	Won
2019	38th Hong Kong Film Awards	Best Film from Mainland and Taiwan	Dying to Survive	Won

== See also ==
- I Hope You Are Well
