= Nice View (film) =

- Theatrical release poster
- Traditional Chinese: 奇蹟·笨小孩
- Simplified Chinese: 奇迹·笨小孩
- Literal meaning: Miracle · Silly Kid
- Hanyu Pinyin: Qí Jī · Bèn Xiǎo Hái
- Directed by: Wen Muye
- Written by: Zhou Chucen; Wen Muye; Han Xiaohan; Zhong Wei
- Produced by: Ning Hao
- Starring: Jackson Yee
- Cinematography: Wang Boxue
- Edited by: Liu Jinghao; Wang Nan
- Music by: Huang Chao
- Release date: February 1, 2022 (China)
- Running time: 106 minutes
- Country: China
- Language: Mandarin
- Box office: $211 million

Nice View is a 2022 Chinese drama film and the second solo feature film directed by Wen Muye. It follows a young man named Jing Hao who, in order to save his sister, desperately seizes the opportunity he found to start a business, changes his fate, and affects the people around him. The film was completed in October 2021 and was released in mainland China on February 1, 2022 (the first day of the Chinese New Year).

Nice View grossed over $211 million, making it the sixth-highest-grossing Chinese film of 2022. China submitted Nice View for Best International Feature Film at the 95th Academy Awards, but it was not nominated.

== Plot ==
Twenty-year-old Jing Hao moves to Shenzhen with his young sister, Jing Tong, to start a new life. Though the siblings share a warm bond, they struggle financially. Jing Tong has inherited their mother's congenital heart disease and requires surgery as soon as possible. To afford the medical expenses, Jing Hao must raise CN¥350,000 within a year and a half.

By chance, he comes across a batch of defective smartphones. Despite their flaws, these phones can potentially be refurbished and resold after repairs. Seeing an opportunity, Jing Hao takes a risk by taking out a loan to purchase them, planning to restore and sell them for profit. However, he soon realizes that the government is cracking down on the refurbished phone market, putting his entire plan in jeopardy.

Determined to overcome the odds, Jing Hao takes a bold step. He establishes Haojing Electronic Components Factory, dismantling defective phones and selling usable parts to mobile phone companies. If the factory can achieve a yield rate of 85% or higher, he can earn CN¥800,000 in just four months. However, the challenges are immense. He lacks staff, factory space, equipment, and even an initial deposit.

Despite countless obstacles and hardships, Jing Hao's perseverance and courage ultimately helps him succeed. He raises the necessary funds for his sister's surgery and opens the door to a future for both of them.

== Cast ==
- Jackson Yee as Jing Hao
- Tian Yu as Liang Yongcheng
- Chen Halin as Jing Tong, Jing Hao's younger sister
- Qi Xi as Wang Chunmei
- Gong Lei as Zhang Longhao
- Xu Juncong as Zhang Chao
- Wang Ning as Liu Hengzhi
- Huang Yao as Wu Xiaoli
- Gong Jinguo as Zhong Wei

== Production ==
On 5 August 2021, it was revealed Jackson Yee would be the lead in Wen Muye's second feature film. The director's first film is Dying to Survive. Filmed in Shenzhen and across summer and autumn, the crew and cast had endured two resurgences of COVID-19 and four typhoons. Despite adequate natural rainfall, artificial rain was used, so they could control it according to their requirements and vision. Filming wrapped on 8 October 2021.

== Music ==
Name	Composer	Lyricist(s)	Singer(s)	Note
"Same Old Silly Kid" (还是笨小孩) (Note: Adapted from "Stupid Child" (笨小孩) by Andy Lau, Blackie Ko, Jacky Wu in 1998)	Gao Feng	Andy Lau, Lin Qiao (Adapted)	Andy Lau, Jackson Yee	Promotional Theme Song
"Come Back to You" (回到你身边)	Huang Chao	Ge Ge	Zhou Shen	New Wish Song
"Run Ahead" (向前跑)	Huang Chao	Ge Ge	Bibi Zhou	Commencement Song
"Song of Good Luck" (好运歌)	Huang Chao	Ge Ge	Zhang Bichen, Liu Yuning	Wishing Song
"Woo" (呜呜呜)	Huang Chao	Ge Ge	Sound Fragment	Assembly Song
"Boundless Oceans, Vast Skies" (海阔天空) (Note: A cover of "Boundless Oceans, Vast Skies" (海阔天空) by Beyond in 1993)	Wong Ka Kui	Wong Ka Kui	Jackson Yee, Xue Junchong, Tian Yu, Wang Ning, Gong Lei, Huang Yao, Qi Xi	Companion Song

== Reception ==
Nice View has become a holiday favorite among those in the Chinese film industry, who have rallied the headlines on social media. The film rose from fifth to third during its opening weekend, grossing $104.4 million.

Some critics praised the film as "one of the best homegrown productions in recent years that focuses on the dreams, endeavors and touching emotions of ordinary people against a massive historical backdrop." With its "sophisticated techniques and compelling [plot]", it provides experience for similar films to be made in the future. This film "also pays tribute to ordinary people who have contributed to the country's remarkable progress and development over the past few decades."
