= Jackson Yee =

Chinese actor and singer (born 2000)

- 易烊千玺
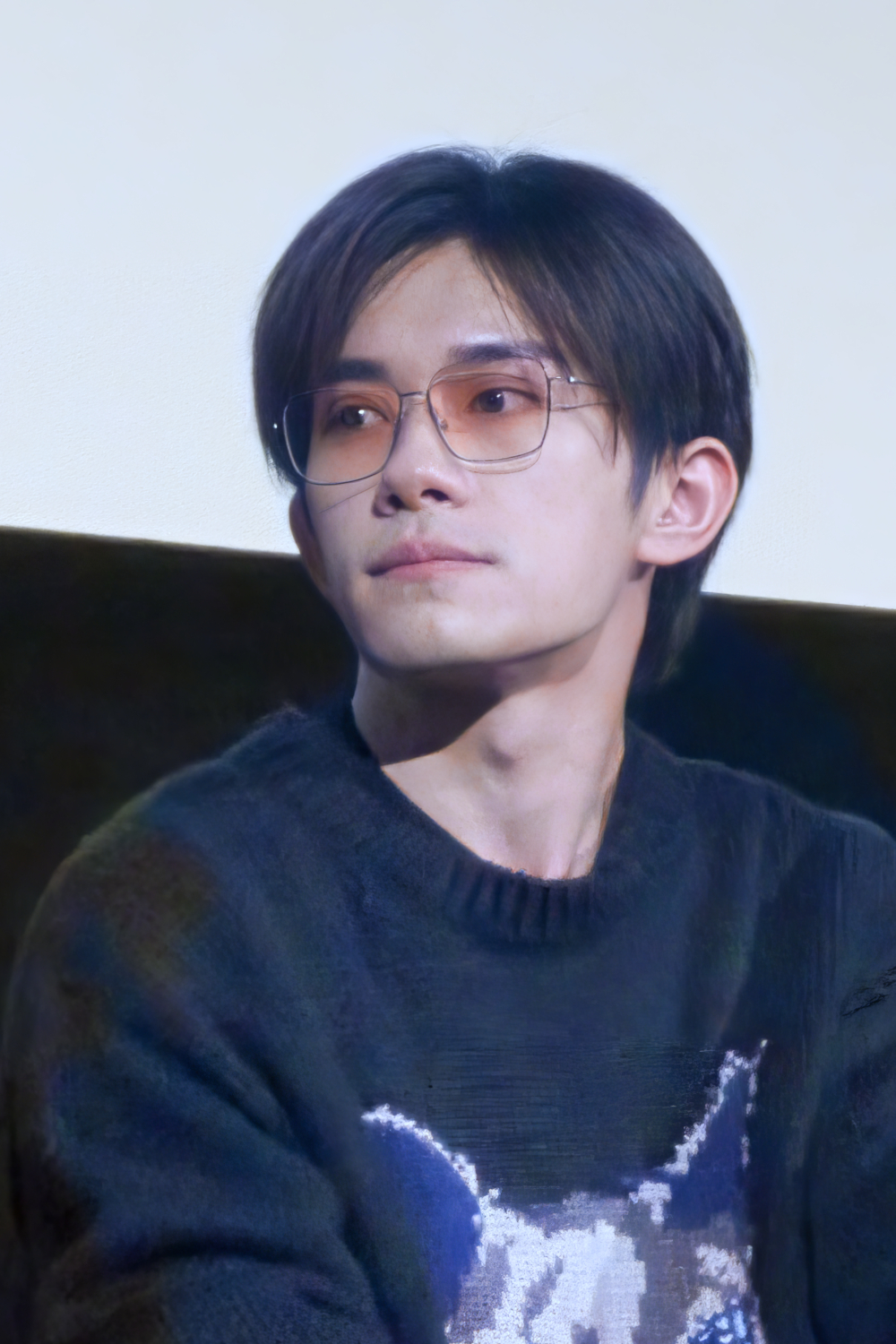
- Yee in 2024
- Born: Yi Yangqianxi; 28 November 2000 (age 25); Huaihua, Hunan, China
- Education: Central Academy of Drama
- Occupations: Singer; actor; dancer; songwriter
- Years active: 2003–present
- Organization: Jackson Yee Fund
- Musical career
- Genres: Mandopop; dance
- Instruments: Vocals, bass
- Labels: Time Fengjun Entertainment; Jackson Yee Studio; Beijing Jiumude Culture Media Center
- Member of: TFBoys
- Formerly of: Fashion Youngster

Chinese name
- Traditional Chinese: 易烊千璽
- Simplified Chinese: 易烊千玺
Transcriptions
Standard Mandarin
- Hanyu Pinyin: Yì Yángqiānxǐ

Yi Yangqianxi (Chinese: 易烊千玺; pinyin: Yì Yángqiānxǐ; born 28 November 2000), also known as Jackson Yee, is a Chinese actor, singer, and member of boy group TFBoys. Following his boy-band success in the 2010s, he established himself as an actor with his breakthrough role in Better Days (2019), earning multiple Best New Actor awards, including at the Hong Kong Film Awards, the Hundred Flowers Awards, and the Asian Film Awards. He subsequently starred in A Little Red Flower (2020), Nice View (2022), Full River Red (2023), Big World (2024), for which he won the Golden Rooster Award for Best Actor, and Resurrection (2025).

Yee ranked 8th on Forbes China Celebrity 100 list in 2019, 1st in both 2020 and 2021.

== Career ==
=== 2005–2013: Career beginnings, Fashion Youngster ===
Yee began his career as a child star, appearing in several variety programs from 2005 to 2008. In 2009, Yee became a member of former Chinese idol group Fashion Youngsters. He left the group in 2011. In 2010, Yee made his acting debut in the television series Iron Pear.

In March 2012, Yee participated in Hunan TV's reality talent show Up Young and entered the top 100. Despite being eliminated, he attracted the attention of TF Entertainment and was invited to audition with the company. Prior to debuting with TFBoys, Yee released his first solo single Dream Skyscraper. He also acted in several short films and appeared in the music video for Father (2013), a song by The Voice of China contestant Zhang Hexuan.

=== 2013–2016: TFBoys and solo activities ===
Yee officially debuted as a member of TFBoys in August, 2013. In 2015, he voiced the main character for the Chinese dub of the animated movie The Little Prince.

In July 2016, he starred in the xianxia television series, Noble Aspirations, playing a fox demon. In November, he released his second solo single "You Say". The single was produced by music producer Lee Wei Song and written by Leehom Wang. The same month, he joined the cast of the variety show Let Go of My Baby.

=== 2017–present: Mainstream popularity ===
In January 2017, Yee joined the voice cast of the animated movie GG Bond: Guarding, playing the character of a mysterious man. Yee starred as the young version of the male protagonist in historical drama Song of Phoenix. He also released his own rendition of Li Sao for the soundtrack of the drama.

In September 2017, it was announced that Yee has set up his own independent studio for his solo activities. In November, Yee released his first English language single, titled Nothing to Lose, produced by Harvey Mason Jr., while Yee participated in the lyrics writing. Five days later, he released another single, titled Unpredictable, produced by David Gamson and with lyrics written by Dave Gibson.

In 2018, Yee was confirmed to join the dance-oriented variety show Street Dance of China as a captain. Yee was invited to attend the 60th Grammy Award Ceremony on 28 January 2018, held in New York as the Music Ambassador of Radio 101, a China Music Vision guest. He was also the youngest Chinese musician ever to be officially invited to the ceremony. The same month, Yee was named as one of the top 10 influential charity stars by Sina. Later in the year, it was announced that he will star in the fantasy animated film L.O.R.D: Legend of Ravaging Dynasties 2. He was invited to perform at the closing ceremony of 2018 Asian Games to promote the upcoming Hangzhou Asian Games. This year, he was accepted into Beijing's prestigious Central Academy of Drama after placing first and achieving the highest score for both his college entrance examination and live audition.

In 2019, Yee starred in the film Better Days, adapted from a Chinese novel In His Youth, In Her Beauty. His performance earned him the Best New Performer Award at the 39th Hong Kong Film Awards. The same year, he starred in the historical mystery drama The Longest Day in Chang'an. On 22 December 2019, he held his first solo concert, Su Er in Shanghai, China.

In 2020, Yee starred in period action drama Forward Forever. In November 2020, he released Backseat Theater, a cover album. He recreated his imaginary "backseat concert" based on his numerous journey of going back and forth between North 2nd Ring Road and Changping when he was small. His second film, A Little Red Flower, was released in the theaters on 31 December 2020.

In 2021, Yee's first war film,The Battle at Lake Changjin, was released in the cinemas on 30 September 2021, and it became the highest-grossing film of all time in China. He was featured in the short film, A Date with Snow and Ice, that promotes Beijing Winter Olympic Torch Relay with Eileen Gu. The next year, Yee starred in a sequel to the film, The Battle at Lake Changjin II, was released on 1 February 2022.

In January 2023, Yee starred in the film Full River Red, directed by Zhang Yimou. The film gained a box office of 4.5 billion RMB, becoming one of the highest-grossing film of all time in mainland China. On 14 April 2023, Madame Tussauds Hong Kong and Shanghai joined together to unveil two brand new wax figures of Yee. He is also the first-ever millennial to have three different wax figures at Madame Tussauds. His first figure was unveiled in 2018.

In January 2024, Yee was elected as a member of the Chinese Film Association Council, making him the youngest among the 167 members. On 24 June 2024, Yee has been appointed as the first Olympic™️ Friend in the People's Republic of China and will be championing the Olympic Values and Paris 2024 in his homeland. Two days later, with 30 days left until the 2024 Paris Olympics, Yee spoke about the Olympic spirit in an International Olympic Committee promotional video.

In 2025, Yee starred in the art-house film Resurrection, which was selected for the main competition at the 78th Cannes Film Festival and awarded a Special Award. He became the first Chinese actor born after 2000 to surpass ¥20 billion in cumulative box office earnings and was named Best Actor by the China Film Director's Guild. On 15 November 2025, Yee won the Best Actor award at the 38th Golden Rooster Awards for his role in Big World, becoming the youngest actor and the first post-2000 actor to receive the honor. He sang the Mandarin version of the theme song, Together to the Mountains and Seas, for the 2025 National Games for Persons with Disabilities of China.

On 10 August 2026, Yee won the Best Actor awards at the 38th Hundred Flowers Award for his role in Big World, making him the youngest actor to ever win both the Golden Rooster and Hundred Flowers Best Actor awards.

== Other ventures ==
=== Philanthropy and advocacy ===
In June 2017, Yee was chosen as one of the WHO China Tobacco Control Champion by the World Health Organization.

In September 2017, Yee called for preserving and protecting the historic sites, and to stop uncivilized actions on cultural relics and monuments. He was named ambassador of the China Foundation for Cultural Heritage Conservation's Great Wall Charity Campaign Guardian of the Great Wall.

In November 2017, Yee was invited by the World Health Organization to Geneva as one of the four youth leaders from China, to give a speech a calling for the elimination of AIDS discrimination. Shortly after, he was awarded the title of WHO China Special Envoy For Health. As the special envoy for WHO in China, he naturally put an emphasis on healthy living, and also mentioned his support for the Children's Companion Program, a project that aims to help children in rural provinces whose parents have moved away to work in major cities. The same month, he collaborated with 16 other celebrities on the song "Embracing You", which serves as the theme song for 30th World AIDS Day.

At his birthday concert, held on 28 November 2017, Yee announced the establishment of the Jackson Yee Fund. Its first phase will help raise ¥1.5 million ($227,000) to support a charity program for the China Foundation for Poverty Alleviation to help more than 12,000 rural, "left-behind" children, whose parents have moved to urban areas to earn a living with temporary jobs.

In 2019, Yee represented China at the United Nations Economic and Social Council (ECOSOC) Youth Forum. Joined by nearly 1,000 other youth advocates in New York on 8 and 9 April, he met with government ministers and officials to advance the role of young people in the implementation of the 2030 Agenda for Sustainable Development. Using the phrase "Yi qi lai ba!", Yee launched a new collaboration with WHO China encouraging young people to join to choose active, healthy lifestyles.

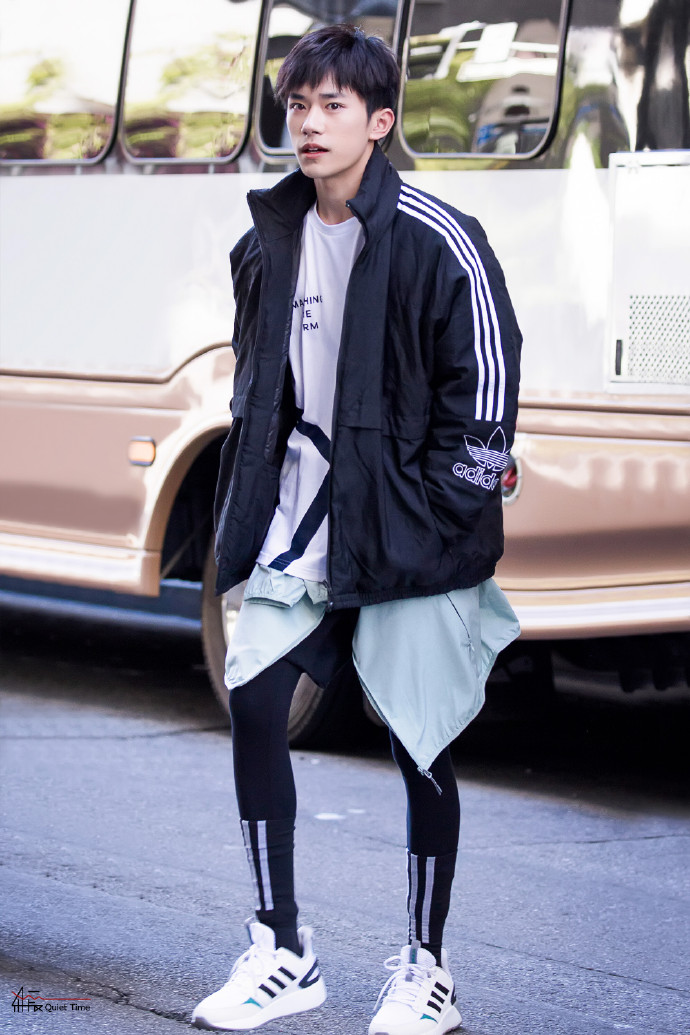
Yee in 2019

On 9 November 2019, Yee was announced as the China Forest Fire Management Charity Ambassador to promote the awareness of forest fires - to prevent forest fires and protect our green homes.⁣

In July 2021, Yee donated ¥1 million to Red Cross Society of China Zhengzhou Branch plus another ¥1 million to Han Hong Love Charity Foundation to relieve the damages done in 2021 Henan floods.

In response to the 2025 Tibet earthquake, Yee donated to the Han Hong Love Charity Foundation. That same year, Yee lent his voice to United Nations Ocean Conference to promote World Oceans Day, calling on people from all sectors of society to raise awareness of and help protect our shared blue planet. Following the Wang Fuk Court fire in Hong Kong, Yee donated ¥1 million to Han Hong Love Charity Foundation to support relief efforts.

In 2026, following the Guangxi floods and the Nepal–Tibet floods, Yee supported relief efforts through the China Foundation for Rural Development.

=== Endorsements ===
On 28 July 2021, Yee was announced as the Nescafé brand ambassador as they shared the same attitude of "dare to think and act".

=== Fashion ===
On 5 April 2021, Armani beauty made Yee as its global makeup and skincare ambassador. He had been the ambassador for Giorgio Armani makeup for China since January 2020 and an Emporio Armani global ambassador since August 2020. "Jackson Yee really has a voice in China," Véronique Gautier, global president of Armani Beauty, told WWD. She said he also resonates with young people and his human engagement echoes that of Giorgio Armani. On 19 January 2022, Armani beauty made Yee its Giorgio Armani Global Beauty Ambassador.

On 16 April 2021, Yee was promoted to Tiffany & Co.'s global ambassador as his endorsement of the brand at a regional level in China since his appointment June 2020 has "generated impressive levels of social media fan growth and consumer engagement that well exceeded our expectations," said CEO Alessandro Bogliolo. President Anthony Ledru mentioned in fall 2023 that the utilization of a digital Chinese Valentine's Day campaign with Yee had produced remarkable results as they looked for novel ways to draw in new audiences.

On 1 November 2022, Yee was appointed as the global ambassador of Jaeger-LeCoultre. "I greatly admire Jaeger-LeCoultre for its elegant and timeless style, rich heritage and constant quest for innovation," Yee said of his latest appointment. "I feel honored to work with the Maison and very much look forward to our new collaboration."

On 19 June 2024, Yee was selected as the global brand ambassador of Lindberg. He embodies the brand's spirit of "design, innovation, and personalization" through his versatility and eagerness to explore new creative realms.

On 20 August 2024, Yee was named the Golden Goose global brand ambassador. According to Silvio Campara, the CEO of Golden Goose, he aligns with brands stated values of creative energy and passion.

== Controversy ==
In August 2019, Yee ended his contracts with Givenchy after the brand produced a T-shirt listing Hong Kong, Macau and Taiwan as separate countries.

In March 2021, Yee distanced himself with Adidas after the brand announced its decision to not use cotton sourced from the Xinjiang region where there were alleged human rights issues.

On 6 July 2022, Yee, a graduate of the Central Academy of Drama, was named one of the successful applicants to the National Theatre of China. The announcement of a celebrity securing a bianzhi—a stable job with lifetime benefits at a government or government-backed institution—sparked heated discussion online over alleged recruitment irregularities, especially given China’s tough job market at the time. On 16 July, the National Theatre of China issued a statement clarifying that the hiring process complied with official standards and procedures. On 17 July, Yee announced his withdrawal from the position to quell the controversy.

== Discography ==
- Temperature Curve (2019)
- Back Seat Theater (2020)
- Liu Yanfen (2023)
- Keystone (2025)

== Filmography ==
=== Film ===
Year	English title	Chinese title	Role	Notes	Ref.
2013	Keep Up	追上去	Hsiao-chieh	Short film	
2013	Snail	蜗牛	Changshu	Short film	
2015	Pound of Flesh	致命追击		Cameo	
2015	Mr. Six	老炮儿		Cameo	
2015	The Little Prince	小王子	Little Prince	Mandarin dub	
2017	GG Bond: Guarding	猪猪侠之英雄猪少年	Mysterious man	Mandarin dub	
2019	Better Days	少年的你	Bei / Liu Bei Shan		
2020	A Little Red Flower	送你一朵小红花	Wei Yihang		
2021	Chinese Doctors	中国医生	Yang Xiaoyang	Cameo	
2021	The Battle at Lake Changjin	长津湖	Wu Wanli		
2022	Nice View	奇迹·笨小孩	Jing Hao		
2022	The Battle at Lake Changjin II	长津湖之水门桥	Wu Wanli		
2022	Hero	世间有她	Li Zhaohua		
2023	Full River Red	满江红	Sun Jun		
2024	She's Got No Name	酱园弄	Song		
2024	Big World	小小的我	Liu Chunhe		
2025	Resurrection	狂野时代	Deliriant / Qiu Moyun / Mongrel / Jia Shengjun / Apollo		
2026	Scare Out	惊蛰无声	Yan Di		
TBA	Battle of Penghu	澎湖海战	Kangxi Emperor		
TBA	The Forbidden Land	蛮荒禁地	Shen Xing		
TBA	Three Words	三个字	Daguang		

=== Television series ===
Year	English title	Chinese title	Role	Notes	Ref.
2010	Iron Pear	铁梨花	Zhang Jian (young)		
2011	Super Equipment Kids	超装备小子	Hsiang-Tzu		
2016	Love for Separation	小别离	Song Yunzhe	Cameo	
2016	Noble Aspirations	青云志	Xiao Qi	Cameo	
2017	Song of Phoenix	思美人	Qu Yuan (young)	Cameo	
2017	Boy Hood	我们的少年时代	Yin Ke		
2019	The Longest Day in Chang'an	长安十二时辰	Li Bi		
2020	Forward Forever	热血同行	Yi		
2026	The Litchi Road	长安的荔枝	Chang Yuan	Cameo	

=== Web series ===
Year	English title	Chinese title	Role	Notes	Ref.
2013	The Legend of Yunchu Temple	云居寺传奇	Fugui		
2014	Hi-Tech Belle	高科技少女喵	Lee Kenan's younger brother	Cameo	
2014	Surprise Season 2	万万没想到第二季		Cameo	
2016	Finding Soul	超少年密码	Chen Haoxuan		

=== Variety show ===
Year	English title	Chinese title	Notes	Ref.
2017	Let Go of My Baby Season 2	放开我北鼻 2	Cast member	
2017	The Inn	亲爱的·客栈	Guest	
2018	Street Dance of China	这！就是街舞	Captain	
2019	Ice Hockey Hero	大冰小将	Cast member	
2019	Street Dance of China Season 2	这！就是街舞 2	Captain	
2020	Welcome Back To Sound	朋友请听好	Cast member	

=== Short film ===
Year	English title	Chinese title	Role	Ref.
2013	Catch	追上去	Jie	
2013	Snail	蜗牛	Zhang Shu	
2016	I am Your TFphone	我是你的TFphone		
2017	Memory Cleaner	记忆清除者	Yin Ke	
2017	The Test of the Cute Master	萌主的考验		
2018	Dream a Little Dream of You	-		
2019	A Self-inflicted Whistleblower	痛打自己的告密者	Sen	
2021	A Date with Snow and Ice	冰雪之约		
2022	New Year Delivery	新年快递		
2023	At the Fair	在集市上		
2023	Say Cheese	未知动物	Zhuang Zhou	
2024	Memory	记忆奇旅	Mr. Yang	
2025	Memory 2: The Last Upload	记忆奇旅2：最后上传	Mr. Yang	
2025	Undercurrent	潜息		
2026	Memory 3	记忆奇旅3：重启	Mr. Yang	

=== Music video appearances ===
Year	Title	Chinese title	Singer	Ref.
2013	"Father"	爸爸	Zhang Hohsuan	
2017	"Almost Famous"	成名在望	Mayday	

== Accolades ==
=== Awards and nominations ===
Year	Award	Category	Nominated work	Results	Ref.
2016	16th Top Chinese Music Awards	Most Popular Idol	—N/a	Won	
2016	16th Top Chinese Music Awards	Most Popular Newcomer	—N/a	Won	
2016	16th Top Chinese Music Awards	Most Popular Variety Idol	—N/a	Won	
2017	Fresh Asia Chart Festival	Top Ten Songs	You Say	Won	
2017	Fresh Asia Chart Festival	Top Ten Songs	The Lament	Won	
2017	Billboard Radio China 2017	Mandarin Song of the Year	The Lament	Won	
2017	10th Elle Style Awards	Popular Idol of the Year	—N/a	Won	
2017	Bazaar 2017 Men of the Year Awards	Attractive Celebrity of the Year	—N/a	Won	
2017	GQ Men of the Year Awards 2017	Popular Idol of the Year	—N/a	Won	
2018	7th iQiyi All-Star Carnival	Male Singer of the Year	—N/a	Won	
2019	GQ 2019 Men of the Year	Top Ten Influential Figures	—N/a	Won	
2019	6th The Actors of China Award Ceremony	Best Actor (Web series)	The Longest Day in Chang'an	Nominated	
2019	26th Huading Awards	Best Actor	The Longest Day in Chang'an	Nominated	
2019	26th Huading Awards	Top Ten Favorite Actors	The Longest Day in Chang'an	Won	
2019	Golden Bud - The Fourth Network Film And Television Festival	Best Newcomer	The Longest Day in Chang'an	Nominated	
2019	8th China Student Television Festival	Most Watched Actor	The Longest Day in Chang'an	Won	
2019	Tencent Entertainment White Paper	Film Actor of the Year	Better Days	Won	
2019	Tencent Entertainment White Paper	Reputable Variety Artist of the Year	—N/a	Won	
2019	Tencent Entertainment White Paper	Most Commercially Valuable Artist	—N/a	Won	
2020	Weibo Awards Ceremony	Hot Figure of the Year	—N/a	Won	
2020	26th Hong Kong Film Critics Society Awards	Best Actor	Better Days	Nominated	
2020	39th Hong Kong Film Awards	Best Actor	Better Days	Nominated	
2020	39th Hong Kong Film Awards	Best New Performer	Better Days	Won	
2020	28th Shanghai Film Critics Awards	Best New Actor	Better Days	Won	
2020	27th Huading Awards	Best Actor in a Motion Picture	Better Days	Nominated	
2020	27th Huading Awards	Best New Performer	Better Days	Won	
2020	35th Hundred Flowers Awards	Best Newcomer	Better Days	Won	
2020	14th Asian Film Awards	Best Newcomer	Better Days	Won	
2020	30th China TV Golden Eagle Award	Best Actor	The Longest Day in Chang'an	Nominated	
2020	30th China TV Golden Eagle Award	Audience's Choice for Actor	The Longest Day in Chang'an	Nominated	
2020	7th The Actors of China Award Ceremony	Best Actor (Web series)	The Longest Day in Chang'an	Nominated	
2020	17th Guangzhou College Student Film Festival	Most Popular Actor	Better Days	Won	
2020	33rd Golden Rooster Awards	Best Actor	Better Days	Nominated	
2021	28th Huading Awards	Global Best Young Actor/Actress	Better Days	Nominated	
2021	Sina Film & TV Awards	Actor Of the Year	Better Days	Won	
2021	30th Huading Awards	Best Actor	A Little Red Flower	Nominated	
2021	Weibo Movie Awards Ceremony	Popular Actor of The Year	A Little Red Flower	Won	
2021	34th Golden Rooster Awards	Best Actor	A Little Red Flower	Nominated	
2022	18th Guangzhou College Student Film Festival	Most Popular Actor	A Little Red Flower	Won	
2022	36th Hundred Flowers Awards	Best Actor	Nice View	Nominated	
2022	36th Hundred Flowers Awards	Best Supporting Actor	Chinese Doctors	Nominated	
2022	35th Golden Rooster Awards	Best Actor	Nice View	Nominated	
2022	14th Macau International Movie Festival	Best Actor	Nice View	Nominated	
2022	1st Aollywood Five Continents International Film Festival	Best Actor	Nice View	Nominated	
2023	19th China Huabiao Film Awards	Outstanding Actor	Nice View	Nominated	
2023	18th Changchun Film Festival	Best Actor	Full River Red	Won	
2023	1st Golden Panda Awards	Best Actor In A Leading Role, Film Category	Nice View	Nominated	
2024	5th Tencent Music Entertainment Awards	2024 TMEA Annual Physical Album	Liu Yanfen	Won	
2024	37th Hundred Flowers Awards	Best Actor	Full River Red	Nominated	
2025	16th China Film Directors' Night	Best Actor	Big World	Won	
2025	38th Golden Rooster Awards	Best Actor	Big World	Won	
2026	1st CMG China Film Festival	Actor of the Year in a Feature Film	Resurrection	Won	
2026	38th Hundred Flowers Awards	Best Actor	Big World	Won	
2026	4th Wave Music Awards	Best Folk Song	Wooden Wedge	Won	
2026	4th Wave Music Awards	Best Single Production	Wooden Wedge	Nominated	
2026	4th Wave Music Awards	Best Soundtrack	Song of Altay	Nominated	

=== Forbes ===
Year		Rank	Ref.
2019	Forbes China Celebrity List	8th	
2020	Forbes China Celebrity List	1st	
2020	Forbes Asia's 100 Digital Stars	2nd	
2021	Forbes China Celebrity List (Note: Forbes China Celebrity List ended in 2021 as platforms will no longer be able to publish lists of popular celebrity individuals.)	1st	
