= Yang Zi (actress) =

Chinese actress and singer (born 1992)

- 杨紫
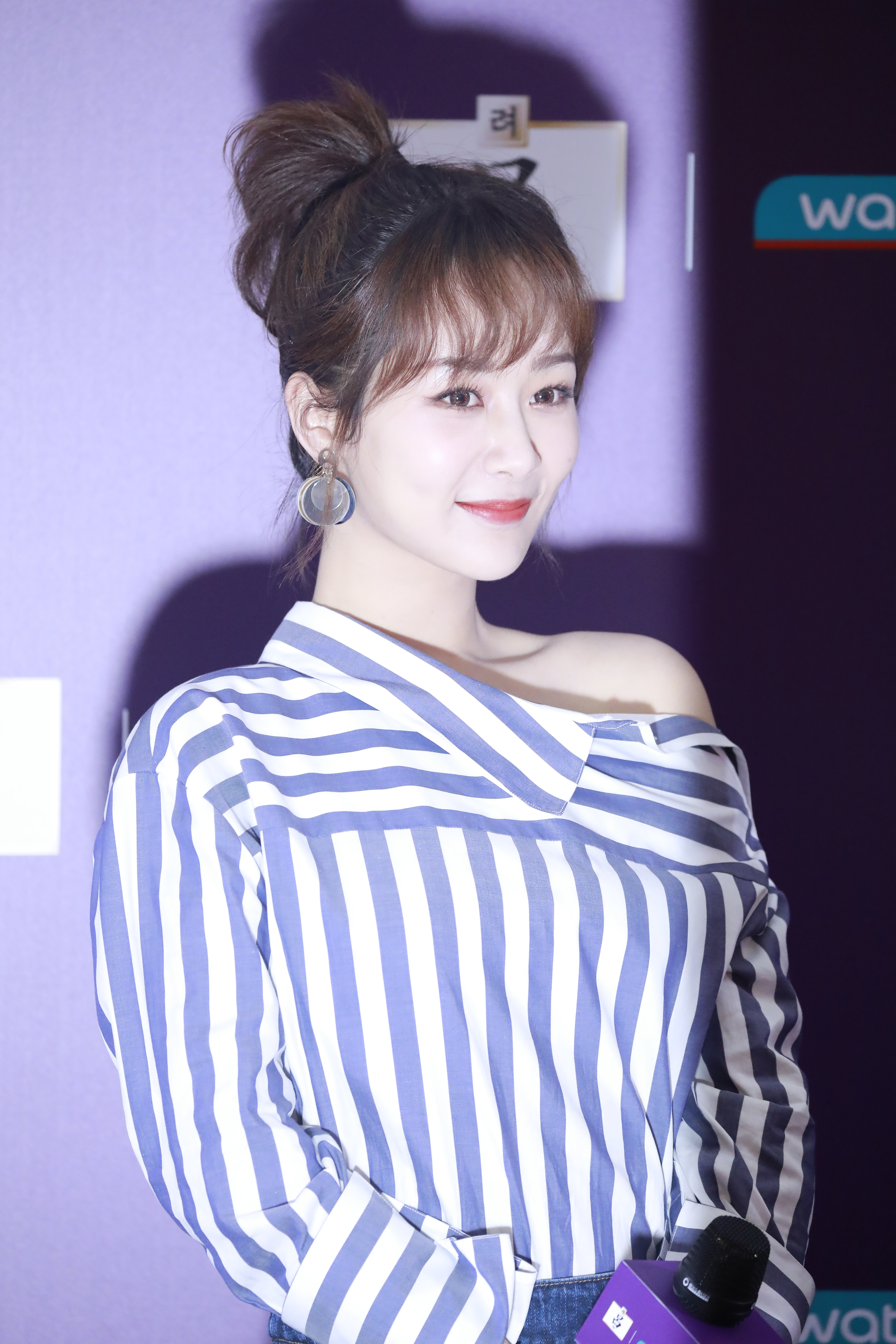
- Yang in 2019
- Born: Yang Niao (杨旎奥); 6 November 1992 (age 34); Beijing, China
- Other name: Andy Yang
- Education: Beijing Film Academy (BFA)
- Occupations: Actress; singer
- Years active: 1999–present
- Agents: Yang Zi Studio, Confidence Entertainment

Chinese name
- Simplified Chinese: 杨紫
- Traditional Chinese: 楊紫
Transcriptions
Standard Mandarin
- Hanyu Pinyin: Yáng Zǐ

Yang Zi (Chinese: 杨紫; pinyin: Yáng Zǐ; born 6 November 1992), also known as Andy Yang, is a Chinese actress and singer. Known for her roles in film and television, she has received several accolades including a Magnolia Award. Yang has ranked among China's most influential and highest paid actresses and was named as one of the Four Dan Actresses of the post 90s generation by Southern Metropolis Daily. Yang was listed by Forbes as an honoree on the Forbes China 30 under 30 list in 2017 and on the Forbes China Celebrity 100 list in 2017, 2019, 2020, and 2021. In 2020, Forbes also named her as one of the most influential star in Asia on their Asia's 100 Digital Star list.

Yang has attended the Performing Arts School of Beijing Film Academy. As a child, she rose to fame after acting in the popular sitcom Home with Kids. Transitioning to adult roles, she earned critical acclaim with Love Comes Knocking on the Door (2011), Battle of Changsha (2014), Yangko Dance (2015) and Insistence (2012) for which she won the Best Newcomer Award at the 14th Golden Phoenix Awards. Her breakthrough came with the xianxia drama Noble Aspirations (2016) and the urban drama Ode to Joy (2016). For her performance in Ode to Joy, she was nominated for Best Actress and Best Supporting Actress awards in the 29th China TV Golden Eagle Award and 23rd Shanghai Television Festival respectively.

Yang continued to rise to mainstream fame with a string of successful television series including Ashes of Love (2018), Go Go Squid! (2019), The Oath of Love (2022), Immortal Samsara (2022), Lost You Forever (2023), Best Choice Ever (2024), Flourished Peony (2025) and Born to Be Alive (2026). For her performance in Born to Be Alive, she won the Best Actress award at the 31st Shanghai Television Festival. She also became the first actress to earn three consecutive Best Actress nomination at the Shanghai Television Festival for Lost You Forever, Flourished Peony and Born to Be Alive.

She also made her mark on the big screen with the films YOLO (2024), Bodies at Rest (2019) and The Bravest (2019) for which she got a Best Supporting Actress nomination in the 35th Hundred Flowers Awards. Yang was named "Actress of the Year" by the Chinese magazine People (人物). She was one of the torchbearers for the Paris 2024 Olympics.

== Early life and education ==
Yang was born as Yang Ni’ao (Chinese: 杨旎奥; pinyin: Yáng Nǐào) on 6 November 1992 in Fangshan District, Beijing, China. Her father Yang Yunfei was a firefighter who worked in emergency rescue and disaster relief and her mother Ma Haiyan was a housewife. Her father named her Yang Ni’ao to wish China a successful bid for the Olympics. (Note: Her father was very patriotic and chose "奥 (ao)" from the idiom "成功申奥 (cheng gong shen ao)", which means to have a successful bid for the Olympics and named her Yang Niao.) From an early age, her parents accompanied her to various audition because of her love for acting. She first starred in Ru Chi Chu Shan at the age of 6.

Yang studied at Beijing Fangshan District Xingcheng Primary School, and Beijing No. 55 High School. In 2010, she was accepted to Beijing Film Academy and graduated on 22 May 2014, with a major in performance.

== Career ==
=== 1999–2009: Beginnings and rise to prominence ===
In 1999, Yang made her acting debut by playing Zhou Qiong in Ru Ci Chu Shan. (Note: The series was filmed in 1999 and released in 2002.) In 2002, Yang had a minor role as little Consort Donggo in Xiaozhuang Epic. In May 2004, Yang made her big-screen debut in the youth romance film Girl's Diary, playing Ran Dongyang, an elementary school student. She received a Best Child Actor nomination at the Tongniu Film Awards for her performance in the film. (Note: In 2005, the original Huabiao Awards, Tongniu Film Awards and Xiayan Awards were combined and renamed as China Huabiao Film Awards by the Ministry of Culture.)

In 2005, Yang rose to prominence playing Xia Xue in the popular mainland Chinese sitcom Home with Kids. The series reached number one in ratings when it aired in China, and won the Outstanding Television Series (for children) award at the Flying Apsaras Awards and the Golden Eagle Awards. Yang became a household name in China since then. In March, she played little Bing Yue in historical costume drama Young Kangxi. In 2006, she reprised her role as Xia Xue in the sequel Home with Kids 2, though not in the subsequent installments.

In June 2008, Yang released her first solo album titled Home with Snow, which is named after her character's name in Home with Kids. In 2009, Yang voiced Ma Xiaotiao in the comedy animation series Mo's Mischief: Teacher's Pet, adapted from Yang Hongying's children's literature series of the same name. The same year, Yang played her first leading role in the youth drama Girl Rushes Forward.

=== 2010–2015: Transition to teenage roles ===
In 2010, Yang starred in the friendship drama Boy's Diary. Then she was admitted to the Performance Institute of Beijing Film Academy. In February 2011, she starred in the family drama Love Comes Knocking on the Door, based on the novel Stepmother by Geling Yan. Her role as a rebellious teenager allowed her to successfully shed her image of a "child star".

In May 2012, Yang starred in the medical drama Angel Heart, portraying a kindhearted nurse. In August, she starred in the horror mystery thriller film Insistence, and won the Best Newcomer Award at the 14th Golden Phoenix Awards. She also performed the official soundtrack, "The Quiet Rubble" for the film. In February 2013, Yang played the lead role in the period comedy drama King Rouge. In April, she starred in the family drama Dad Comes Home. In August, she starred in the romance drama Flowers in Fog, written by acclaimed Taiwanese writer Chiung Yao.

In March 2014, Yang starred in her first war drama Battle of Changsha, directed by Magnolia Award-winner Kong Sheng. The show was set against the backdrop of the Battle of Changsha in 1939 during World War II. Yang played the role of Hu Xiangxiang, a nurse in the field hospital with different temperaments from the bright and lively girlhood to the aftermath of being a wife and a mother. The show was a critical success and was voted Best Drama of 2014 in major streaming website Douban after being broadcast on CCTV-8 beginning mid-July 2014. In May, Yang joined the second season of youth inspirational reality show We Are Young as a regular cast member.

In April 2015, Yang joined Dragon TV's star travel-reality show Sisters Over Flowers as a regular cast member. In August, she starred in the youth romance film Where Are All The Time. In October, Yang starred in the period drama Yangko Dance, which is a story inspired by the Haiyang Yangge folk dance that follows a man who gets caught in the complications of family, love and revenge. Within 21 days of its broadcast, the series became the Provincial Television Prime Ratings Champion in Jiangsu Television and Tianjin TV, maintaining top 5 positions till the end of its broadcast and has reached a total of 10 billion online views. Yang's portrayal of the kindhearted and patriotic young lady received positive reviews. The same month, she co-starred in the horror mystery web series The Ferryman.

=== 2016–2019: Rising popularity and breakthrough ===
In April 2016, Yang starred in the metropolitan romance drama Ode to Joy, which depicts the stories of five young women who comes from different social and educational backgrounds, but share a common goal. The show received critical acclaim and commercial success, and Yang gained widespread recognition for her portrayal of Qiu Yingying, a simple-minded girl from a small town. Yang was nominated for the Best Actress award at the China TV Golden Eagle Award, and the Best Supporting Actress award at the 23rd Shanghai Television Festival for her performance. In June, she starred in urban romance drama Perfect Wedding, where she played the role of a wedding planner. In July, she portrayed Lu Xueqi, one of the two female protagonists in Noble Aspirations, the television series adaption of the Xianxia novel Zhu Xian. The drama was a commercial success and accumulated 23 billion views online, the highest record held by a Chinese drama at that time. Yang gained wider popularity as a result and was nominated at the 22nd Huading Awards as Best Actress in the ancient drama category for her performance. In August, she co-starred in Crying Out in Love, a film based on the romance novel Socrates in Love by Japanese novelist Kyoichi Katayama. In December, she returned in the second season of Noble Aspirations as Lu Xueqi.

In May 2017, she starred in the historical romance comedy drama Legend of Dragon Pearl. Yang reprised her role as Qiu Yingying in the second installment of Ode to Joy.

In April 2018, she played a guest role in the urban drama Women in Beijing. She then joined the second season of Chinese youth variety show Give Me Five, as a regular cast member. In July, she starred in The Destiny of White Snake, a fantasy romance drama based on the renowned Chinese folktale. Yang's portrayal of the innocent and naive snake spirit; as well as her voice-dub for the character, received positive reviews. In August, Yang starred in the fantasy romance drama Ashes of Love, playing an innocent and lively fairy maiden. The series was a commercial success, topping both television and web ratings; and received positive reviews. Yang received acclaim for her acting and experienced a new high in popularity. On 26 November, she joined Sina Entertainment's year-end special project short film "The Most Beautiful Performance".

On 28 May 2019, Yang unveiled her wax figure at Madame Tussauds Beijing through an unveiling ceremony. In July, she starred in the e-sport romantic comedy drama Go Go Squid!, playing a talented computer major who is also a popular online singer. The drama topped television ratings and had been streamed more than 9.6 billion times in its timeslot and was praised for its transmitting positive and uplifting messages such as the pursuit of dreams as well as patriotism. The success of Go Go Squid reaffirmed Yang's popularity. She won the Best Actress award in modern drama category at the 26th Huading Awards for her performance. She also sang the ending theme song of the drama titled "Milk Bread", which reached number 2 on Billboard China Social Chart. She then joined the third season of cooking reality show Chinese Restaurant 3 as a regular cast member. In August, Yang featured in the disaster film The Bravest as the wife of a firefighter, the film achieved a box office result of 1.679 billion yuan and Yang won the Most Popular Supporting Actress award at the 16th Guangzhou Student Film Festival. She was also nominated for the Best Supporting Actress award at the 35th Hundred Flowers Awards and the 11th Macau International Film Festival for her performance. The same month, she starred in the crime suspense film Bodies at Rest playing a forensics scientist. She then starred in the romance environmental protection drama My Mowgli Boy where she played a marketing executive.

=== 2020–2023: Further prominence ===
In October 2020, she featured in the segment "Last Lesson" directed by Xu Zheng as part of the nationalistic film My People, My Homeland, and sang the promotional OST "My Homeland" for the film. In November, she starred in Hear Her, the first monologue series in China about women's rights. Hear Her is based on the format of BBC Studio's short-film series Snatches: Moments from Women's Lives, produced and directed by famous Chinese actress Zhao Wei. Her themed episode is called "Wish for Love". On 20 December, as the "Guardian of National Treasure" Yang participated in an episode of the third season of large-scale cultural exploration CCTV-1 show National Treasure.

In February 2021, Yang played a guest role in Dt.Appledog's Time, the sequel to her hit drama Go Go Squid!. In May, she participated in the iQIYI detective reality show The Detectives' Adventures. On 1 July, Yang participated in the "Great Journey", a large-scale epic theatrical performance to celebrate the 100th anniversary of the founding of the Chinese Communist Party and performed in the inaugural skit "Breaking Dawn" along with several other artists. In September, Yang was announced as one of the 6 recommendation officers for City Personification (Note: City Personification is the literal meaning of "城市拟人".) IP series, representing Beijing. Bigeye Comics and Weibo Animation collaborated to release comic strips of Yang and Yan Bo (Note: Yan Bo is a Manhua character.) called Yang Zi X Yan Bo "Hutong Projector". On 15 November 2021, Yang Zi posted on social media, announcing that the six-year contract with H&R Century Pictures would not be renewed and on 16 November, she established her personal studio. In November, she played the titular character psychologist He Dun, in the urban drama Psychologist, the television series adaption of Bi Shumin's 2007 novel "Female Psychologist", directed by Malaysian director Sam Quah.

On 4 January 2022, Yang participated in an episode of People's Daily's "Dream Radio" Season 4: "Chinese Youth" as a guest host to promote Beijing Winter Olympic with Olympic gold medalist athlete Li Jianrou. On 15 February, she joined Tencent's "Olympic Report Star Radio" for the 2022 Winter Olympics and 2022 Winter Paralympics. In March, she starred in the romance drama The Oath of Love, playing a cellist. The series was a commercial success and was streamed over 3.8 billion times during its broadcast and won the "Tencent Business Breakthrough Award", one of the highest platform-level award. In July, she starred in the fantasy romance drama Immortal Samsara, playing a lotus fairy. The series became very successful commercially and topped various charts during its broadcast. Yang got a nomination for Best Actress in Ancient Drama category at the 35th Huading Awards for her performance. In November, He Dun's Happiness, the remaining part of Psychologist premiered on the series's first anniversary.

On 1 January 2023, she signed with Confidence Entertainment, and is currently managed by the company's CEO Lei Yuchen for commercials and fashion resources. In July, she starred in costume myth drama Lost You Forever. Her versatile portrayal of both Xiao Yao and Wen Xiaoliu garnered praises. The series received critical acclaim and commercial success and reaffirmed her ability to deliver successful shows. She was nominated for the Best Actress category at the 29th Shanghai Television Festival for her performance.

=== 2024–present: Mainstream recognition ===
In January 2024, Yang starred in the friendship romance drama Love Endures, playing a journalist. It became the TV series with the highest investment in the history of Youku. The vice-president of Youku said that Love Endures is Youku's first hit drama of 2024 at a seminar held by Peking University. In February, she made a special appearance in the comedy film YOLO. Then in April, she starred in the family drama Best Choice Ever. She played the role of Mai Chenghuan, a young woman who gradually broke free from her mother's domineering care and began to focus on her career. The show received commercial success and topped television ratings and various online chart in its timeslot. She won the Outstanding Actress award at the 20th Chinese American TV Festival. She was nominated for Best Actress award at the 15th Macau International Television Festival and 3rd China Media Group (CMG) Annual Chinese TV Drama Ceremony. In July, she reprised her role in the second season of Lost You Forever.

In January 2025, Yang starred in intangible cultural heritage drama Flourished Peony, playing He Weifang, the daughter of a merchant who endured many hardships in a patriarchal society before becoming a successful female entrepreneur while also helping other women. The series was a commercial success, ranking first in television ratings and various online data chart. It was praised for its accurate depiction of the sets, costumes and customs of the Tang dynasty. Her performance was widely praised. She was awarded Ambassador for Overseas Promotion of Chinese TV Programs and was nominated for the Best Actress award at the 30th Shanghai Television Festival. The series became the most successful TV series in the history of Mango TV. In June, she starred in In the Name of Blossom, the continuation of Flourished Peony. She was nominated for the Best Actress award at the 16th Macau International Television Festival.

In January 2026, Yang starred in the ecological thriller drama Born to be Alive, playing the role of Bai Ju, a policewomen fighting against poachers on the Tibetan Plateau. The series brought attention to the history of wildlife conservation as well as the lives of local communities and environmental protectors in places like Hoh Xil, increasing public interest in the plateau's landscapes, ecology and conservation efforts. Yang's acting as well as her dedication for filming the series in an unfavorable condition gained praises. She won the Best Actress award at the 31st Shanghai Television Festival for her performance. In May, she starred in the intangible cultural heritage drama The Heir.

Her upcoming works include the crime thriller film Drug Hunting, in which she stars as an anti drug policewoman, the historical costume dramas The Golden Hairpin and the biographical drama The Way You Come Back.

== Other activities ==
=== Endorsements ===
Yang has become one of China's most in demand brand ambassador due to her nationwide popularity. She endorses a wide range of products including food and beverages, daily necessities and hygiene products, fashion and beauty, mobile applications and games etc. She endorses many well-known international brands including Valentino, Prada Beauty, APM Monaco, and Michael Kors, as well as big domestic brands such as Chery, Yang Yuan Qing and BOLON Eyewear. In August 2022, Chery Automobile announced Yang as their global brand ambassador.

On 3 July 2023, Yang was appointed as the official ambassador for MLB China. She attended the MLB All Star Game in Seattle on 11 July. In October, she attended the Valentino Paris Fashion Week show and was subsequently announced as Valentino's brand ambassador the month after. APM Monaco announced Yang as their Global Brand Ambassador in December and in April the following year, she launched her own Capsule Collection with the brand. In January 2024, Yang was announced as Prada's makeup and fragrance ambassador. In September, she took on the title of Michael Kors's APAC brand ambassador.

=== Stage performances ===
On 27 January 2017, Yang appeared on the stage of CCTV Spring Festival Gala for the first time and performed the opening song "Beautiful Youths of China" with her sisters from Ode to Joy and TFBoys. On 9 September, Yang joined Bazaar Stars Charity Night to raise money for Bazaar's "Accelerating for Love" ambulance project. On 16 September, she appeared on Vision Wei's 10th Anniversary Concert in Beijing as a special guest, performing "Looking for Someone" and "Our Little World" with the singer. On 15 February 2018, she participated in the comedy skit "At Your Service" at the CCTV Spring Festival Gala with Lin Yongjian, Li Mingqi, and Dai Chunrong. On 31 December, she attended the Hunan TV New Year Eve Concert and performed the song "Unsullied" which is the opening theme song of her drama Ashes of Love.

On 4 February 2019, Yang participated in the comedy skit "Platform" at the CCTV Spring Festival Gala with Shang Daqing, Li Wenqi, Huang Xiaojun and Tong Dawei. On 5 February, she appeared on the Beijing Television Spring Festival Gala and sang the song "Childhood" with 3 other artist. On 17 November, She participated in Bazaar Stars Charity Night and performed a song titled "Mercury" to support an aesthetic education charity project. On 31 December, she participated in the Hunan TV New Year Eve Concert, performing "Possible Night". On 24 January 2020, she performed "Meeting in 20 Years Again" alongside Angela Zhang, Xu Ziwei, and Roy Wang at the CCTV Spring Festival Gala. On 25 January, she participated in Beijing Television Spring Festival Gala together with her co-stars from Home with Kids and performed the song "Beijing, My Love". On 30 September, she participated in the 2020 CCTV National Day Gala and sang the song "Upward Light". On 17 October, Yang attended the 70th Anniversary Celebration of Beijing Film Academy and presented the opening speech of the ceremony. On 31 December, she participated in the Dragon TV New Year Eve Concert, performing "Unsullied", "One person Likes One Person", "Milk Bread", and "Us", the OST of her dramas Ashes of Love, The Oath of Love, Go Go Squid!, and Ode to Joy, respectively.

On 4 May 2021, she participated in CCTV's May 4 Youth Day special program Fight for Youth and performed the song "Landscape Painting". On 31 December, Yang performed the song "The Guardian of Princess Wendy" at the Hunan TV New Year Eve Concert. On 3 May 2022, she participated in Henan Television's May 4 Youth Day special program Long Live Youth. On 31 December, she performed the song "Pink Ocean" at the Hunan TV New Year Eve Gala.

On 21 January 2023, Yang attended CCTV Spring Festival Gala and participated in the opening performance "The Flower Gardener" alongside several other artist and sport persona. She also took part in the comedy skit "I'll Be There Soon" with Wang Baoqiang and Wang Ning. On 31 December, she performed "Lost You Forever", one of the OST of her drama Lost You Forever.

== Public image ==
=== Influence ===
Due to the popularity of Home with Kids, Yang was dubbed as the "Nation's Daughter". In September 2016, she was picked as one of the Four Dan Actresses of the post-90s generation by a survey conducted Southern Metropolis Daily among 173 million netizens and 110 professional media and industry insiders. She ranked 73rd on Forbes China Celebrity 100 list in 2017. Forbes China also listed her under their 30 Under 30 Asia 2017 list which consisted of 30 influential people under 30 years old who have had a substantial effect in their respective fields.

In July 2019, after Go Go Squid! became a massive hit, iQiyi awarded Yang a "KPI锦鲤" pennant. Her digital cover of Esquire Fine China September issue sold more than 150K copies in 10 minutes. In December, she was awarded the "iQiyi Scream Goddess" award at the 8th iQiyi All-Star Carnival. She was named the promotional ambassador for Beijing Television Spring Festival Gala. She ranked 24th on Forbes China Celebrity 100 list in 2019 and 13th in 2020. In January 2020, The Beijing News selected her as the 2019 Entertainment Person of the Year. (Note: In 2019, this honour was given to 3 artist including Yang Zi.) She was awarded Weibo Queen at the Weibo Awards Ceremony. On May, she was named the Most Influential Actress of 2019 by Powerstar China. She appeared on the Forbes Asia's 100 Digital Star list, comprising 100 artists from across the Asia-Pacific region who have been able to stay active, raise awareness and inspire optimism despite the cancellation of physical events during the COVID-19 pandemic. Weibo Entertainment announced Yang as the "Most Commercially Valuable Star" of 2020.

In 2021, Yang ranked 8th on Forbes China Celebrity 100. She was awarded Weibo Queen again at the Weibo Awards Ceremony. In 2023, she became the first post-90s actress to take the cover of first line men's magazine Esquire China. She also became the first ever female to have the dual cover issue for Esquire China and Esquire Fine China. The December issue of Cosmopolitan China with Yang as the cover star sold 100K copies in less than 1 hour and more than 180K copies in first 24 hours.

In January 2024, she was awarded Weibo Queen for the third time, which makes her the only actress to win this honor thrice. She was named "Actress of the Year 2023" by the Chinese magazine People (人物) and appeared on the cover of the magazine as one of the Faces of the Year. Yang was chosen as the "Most Likeable Celebrity" by 70 media professionals by a survey conducted by Sohu Entertainment. In June 2024, she was announced as one of the torchbearers for the Paris 2024 Olympics.

In April 2026, Yang was named the Publicity Ambassador for the 2026 Beijing International Flower Show. On 6 June, an article written by Yang was published in the overseas edition of People's Daily titled "The landscape hides the craftsman's heart and the Huizhou ink embodies the nation". In July, she was appointed as the Promotional Ambassador of the 38th Hundred Flowers Awards. Another article named "It's not good if we don't accept it" written by her was published in Guangming Daily on 29 July.

As of December 2023, Yang has more than 60 million followers on Chinese microblogging platform Weibo. Her topic on Douyin has exceeded 200 billion views making her the first and only post-90s actress to do so.

=== Others ===
In January 2018, she participated in "Our New Era", a public music service advert produced by National Radio and Television Administration to promote youths and Chinese films and recorded a song titled "Thumbs Up For The New Era" and took part in its MV filming along with 20 other artists. In November, she joined the People's Daily to mark the 40th anniversary of the reform and opening up of the "China has me" activity. Then she participated in the celebration of the reform and opening up jointly produced by the Beijing Committee of the Communist Youth League of China and China Youth Daily, recorded the song "The Future Me" and took part in its MV filming.

== Philanthropy ==
In 2008, at the age of 15, Yang went to help children affected by the 2008 Sichuan earthquake with her father as a volunteer. In July 2009, she participated in a child star charity project, withdrew part of the project's fund and donated it to the China Youth Care Foundation and Western China Eagle Education Network to assist young students. Her costume, a pink gauze skirt she wore in Ashes of Love was sold for 12,800 RMB and the money was used in the Amity Foundation's "National Culture Companion Child Growth" project.

In February 2020, Yang donated 500K RMB to help people affected by COVID-19 pandemic. In July 2021, she donated 1.3 million RMB to relieve the damages done in 2021 Henan floods. (Note: She donated 300K RMB to Red Cross Society of China Zhengzhou Branch, 500K RMB to China Foundation for Poverty Alleviation and another 500K RMB to Henan Charity Federation.) Following the outbreak of COVID-19 in Shanghai, China, which began on 28 February 2022, a grant assistance from the China Film Foundation funded by Yang and 3 other actors started in April. Yang donated more than 16 tons of food supplies and other daily necessities to help people affected by the outbreak together with Huang Xuan, Wan Qian and Wen Qi.

In September, she donated 1 million RMB to relieve the damages done in 2022 Luding earthquake. (Note: She donated 500K RMB to Red Cross Society of China Garzê Tibetan Autonomous Prefecture branch and another 500K RMB to Red Cross Society of China Ya'an city branch.) On the official website of China Foundation for Poverty Alleviation, their 2021 Rural Development Annual Report revealed that Yang Zi Studio has become one of their donation partner. In August 2023, she donated 500K RMB to help with the flooding in Beijing and Hebei caused by Typhoon Doksuri. (Note: She donated 250K RMB to Red Cross Society of China Beijing Branch and 250K RMB to Red Cross Society of China Hebei Branch.) In December, she donated to help with the relief efforts for the victims of the Gansu earthquake through Huang Xiaoming's Tomorrow Foundation.

In January 2025, Yang provided financial support through Tomorrow Foundation for the rescue operation following the 2025 Tibet earthquake. Yang together with all the main creators, leading actors, staff and broadcasting platform of the television series Flourished Peony donated another 300K RMB. In July, she donated to support the rescue operation by Tomorrow Foundation in the flood-affected areas of Northern China. In November, she donated 1 million RMB during the Wang Fuk Court fire to support the resettlement and reconstruction of homes for the affected residents. In July 2026, Yang, along with eleven other artist donated funds and sent emergency relief supplies to 4,000 family in the flood-affected areas of Guangxi through Tomorrow Foundation. In August, after the 2026 Nepal–Tibet floods, she donated emergency supplies to the Gyirong Port disaster area in Tibet through Tomorrow Foundation.

=== Ambassadorships and public welfare acts ===
In March 2011, she served as the love ambassador of the "Girl's Heart" charity event, which aims to care for the growth of adolescent girls in millions of families in China. She then participated in "We Share a Blue Sky" charity project. On 22 April 2012, She participated in the 8th Beijing Youth Charity Film Festival as its image ambassador. In July 2013, Yang served as the image ambassador of Chinese Campus Health Action Student Vision Health Guidance Program and encouraged the students to do eye exercise. In April 2017, She was announced as the smart action ambassador for the China Children and Teenager's Fund. She then participated in a project sponsored by the China Foundation for Poverty Alleviation and the China Environmental Protection Foundation titled "Towards Ecological Civilization, Salute to Environmental Protection Pioneers" as its Public Welfare Envoy.

In January 2018, Yang participated in China Women's Development Foundation's "Mother's Postal Package" project as its charity ambassador to help mothers and families in poor areas. In 6 August, she participated in the "For Hope+1" project organized by China Women's Development Foundation to help children with sJIA. She then joined the "My Hometown and Me" campaign jointly initiated by the Central Committee of the Communist Youth League of China and Weibo to help fight poverty. In October, she was announced as an advocate for National Mental Health. She participated in the "Watch Hunger Stop" charity project through Instagram.

In March 2019, Yang joined "China Science Popularization Month" event and served as the ambassador for China Popular Science Month Health. On 5 September, She joined Public Welfare Fund for the "Philharmonic Listening Program" as the ambassador of love. She then participated in the "Beautiful China" education support project that focused on rural education. On 1 November, China Fire and Rescue announced Yang as the messenger for National Fire Prevention Public Welfare.

In January 2020, National Anti-fraud Center announced Yang as their guardian ambassador. On 9 March, Yang participated in "China Science Popularization Month" event and was named as the ambassador for China Popular Science Month Anti-epidemic Science. In April, she participated in World Health Organization's anti-epidemic welfare activities. On 17 October, the 7th National Poverty Alleviation Day, she was invited to work as an Advocate for the China Foundation for Poverty Alleviation to help alleviate poverty. On 28 August, the Supreme People's Court and the People's Court released a mini-video on the popularity of the Public Welfare Act of the Civil Code and invited Yang to participate in the mini-video to explain the rules as China's first ambassador for "Civil Code".

In January 2021, Yang joined hands with Han Hong Love Charity Foundation along with more than 40 celebrity volunteers to support the advocate and practice of public welfare everywhere. In February, she was invited to participate in a video series event as one of the Observer of Law for the Supreme People's Court. On 11 March, she was announced as the first campus charity ambassador of the 11th National Youth Green Plant Adoption. On 12 April, Yang was announced as the promoter of Cybersecurity Education for the 6th National Security Education Day.

Then American cosmetics brand Origins and their brand spokesperson Yang have jointly launched Earth Month environment protection welfare activities in China. On 1 December, Yang and Psychologist joined hands with UNAID for an AIDS Awareness campaign for World AIDS Day 2021. On 4 January 2022, Yang joined hands with China Social Welfare Foundation as one of the public welfare ambassador of "Warm Heart Plan - Love for Farmers" project.

In April 2026, Yang was appointed as "Qinghai Ecological and Cultural Ambassadors". In June, the Ministry of Ecology and Environment appointed Yang as the Special Observer for Ecological and Environmental Protection.

=== WildAid ===
We should do our best to protect nature and its wildlife, so that children have the opportunity to discover and enjoy the wild beauty of nature. This is the most precious gift we can leave them.

— Yang to WildAid

Yang has been an ambassador for WildAid in China since 2019. On 20 December 2019, Yang participated in "Green Lifestyle" charity project jointly created by China Youth Daily, China Youth Online and WildAid and served as ambassador for the Green Lifestyle Public Welfare Promotion. In November 2020, Yang was announced as the ambassador for Promotional Charity of WildAid, advocating to protect wildlife. On 30 April 2021, WildAid and the China Wildlife Conservation Association co-launched a new PSA and billboard entitled "Bring Home Memories, Not Regrets" in China. The new campaign, led by Yang, calls on families not to purchase ivory and other wildlife products as souvenirs, ahead of May Day, a peak vacation and travel period in China.

She also lends her voice to WildAid's elephant program by starring in the "Be Their Role Model" campaign which asks parents to use their actions to set good examples for the next generation by not consuming ivory and other wildlife products. As the Convention on Biological Diversity Conference of Parties (CoP15) opened on 11 October in Kunming, China, WildAid, China Environmental News, and the China Wildlife Conservation Association launched a new billboard campaign series featuring Yang and 3 other WildAid ambassador. She led the COP15 Conservation Biodiversity Campaign, helping to educate the public on the serious consequences of biodiversity loss and calling on the public to take action to protect biodiversity by saying no to illegal wildlife trade.

== Filmography ==
=== Film ===
Year	English title	Chinese title	Role	Notes/Ref.
2003	The Law of Romance	警察有约		Cameo
2004	Girl's Diary	女生日记	Ran Dongyang	
2004	Lao Fei	老费	Xiao Lan	
2004	An Old Record	一张老唱片	Ding Yun	
2004	Dad Wants to Divorce	爸爸要离婚	Ji Ji	
2004	The Quiet Lady	少女穆然	He Lan	
2007	The Last Fragrance	最后的芬芳	Duo Lun	
2008	I Am a Fan	我是粉丝	Qiao Xiaoqiao	
2009	Mo's Mischief: Teacher's Pet	淘气包马小跳	Ma Xiaotiao	Voice-dubbed
2009	Ma-Mha	寻找狗托邦	Nan Qian	Voice-dubbed
2010	Boy and Girl	男生女生	Ran Dongyang	
2010	Money Makes Trouble	小题大做	Shi Xiaotao	
2010	Third Class Fifth Class	三班五班	Ran Dongyang	
2010	Death and Glory in Changde	喋血孤城	Tao Er	
2012	Mother's Call	妈妈的呼唤	Qiao Ni	
2012	Insistence	守株人	Jia Jia	
2014	King Tea Storm	斗茶	Xie Xiaoxiang	
2015	Where Are All The Time	时间都去哪了	Lin Yutong	
2016	Papa	洛杉矶捣蛋计划	Wang Nina	
2016	Crying Out in Love	在世界中心呼唤爱	Xia Ye	
2018	A Paper Marriage	一纸婚约	Ling Ling	
2019	The Bravest	烈火英雄	Wang Lu	
2019	Bodies at Rest	沉默的证人	Qiao Lin	
2020	My People, My Homeland	我和我的家乡	Jiang Ziya	
2020	Soul Snatcher	赤狐书生	Ying Wuxie	Voice-dubbed
2024	YOLO	热辣滚烫	Dou Dou	Cameo
TBA	Drug Hunting	猎毒	Luo Jia	
TBA	The War of Light	转念花开	TBA	

=== Television series ===
Year	English title	Chinese title	Network	Role	Notes/Ref.
2001	The Grand Mansion Gate	大宅门	CCTV-1	girl selling apple	Cameo
2002	The Party Member Ma Dajie	党员马大姐	iQIYI	Xiao Qiang	
2002	Ru Ci Chu Shan	如次出山	CCTV-8	Zhou Qiong	
2002	Xiaozhuang Epic	孝庄秘史	CCTV-1	Consort Donggo (young)	
2004	Crime Scene	案发现场	CCTV-1	Sun Hongyue	Cameo
2004	Jia Ting Dang An	家庭档案		Ji Ji	
2004	Yong Gan Mian Dui	勇敢面对	Guangdong TV	Lingzi	
2005	Home with Kids	家有儿女	Beijing TV, Tencent Video	Xia Xue	
2005	Girl's Diary	女生日记	Hunan TV	Ran Dongyang	
2005	Young Kangxi	少年康熙	Dragon TV, Jilin TV, Southeast TV, iQIYI	Bing Yue	
2005	Fate	缘分	Beijing TV	Wei Sichen	
2006	Home with Kids 2	家有儿女2	Beijing TV, Tencent Video	Xia Xue	
2006	No Limit	无限生机	Mango TV, iQIYI, Youku	Ming Na	
2006	Not Easy to Grow Up	长大不容易		Shu Xin	
2007	Warmth	温暖	CCTV-1	Zhao Xuan	
2008	Being Alive is Good	活着真好	CCTV-8	Chen Huan	
2008	Treasure	珍宝		Bei La	
2009	Girl Rushes Forward	女孩冲冲冲	Harbin TV	Sun Quan	
2009	Don't Want to Grow Up	不想长大	Guangdong TV, Youku	Teacher Jing	
2009	Stage of Youth	青春舞台	CCTV-2	Secretary Liu	Cameo
2009	Coming Home	回家		Zhou Youyou	
2009	Chun Zhen Sui Yue	纯真岁月	Jiangsu TV	Mai Sidan	
2010	Boy's Diary	男生日记	PPTV	Ran Dongyang	
2010	Wu Cheng'en and Journey to the West	吴承恩与西游记	Shandong TV	Ye Yun (young)	
2011	Love Comes Knocking on the Door	幸福来敲门	CCTV-1	Song Zheng	
2012	Angel Heart	心术	Anhui TV, Tianjin TV, Dragon TV, Zhejiang TV	Zhang Xiaolei	
2013	King Rouge	胭脂霸王	Hunan TV	Lei Er	
2013	Dad Comes Home	老爸回家	Jiangxi TV	Lin Ranran	
2013	Flowers in Fog	花非花雾非雾	Hunan TV	Bai Menghua	
2014	Battle of Changsha	战长沙	CCTV-8	Hu Xiangxiang	
2015	Say No For Youth	天生要完美	CCTV-8	An Xiaohui	
2015	Yangko Dance	大秧歌	Jiangsu TV, Tianjin TV	Wu Ruoyun	
2015	The Ferryman	灵魂摆渡	iQIYI	Su Wenxiu	
2016	Ode to Joy	欢乐颂	Dragon TV, Zhejiang TV	Qiu Yingying	
2016	Perfect Wedding	大嫁风尚	Hubei TV	Xia Ran	
2016	Noble Aspirations	青云志	Hunan TV	Lu Xueqi	
2016	Noble Aspirations 2	青云志2	Tencent Video	Lu Xueqi	
2017	Legend of Dragon Pearl	龙珠传奇	Anhui TV, Beijing TV, Youku	Li Yihuan	
2017	Ode to Joy 2	欢乐颂2	Dragon TV, Zhejiang TV	Qiu Yingying	
2018	Women in Beijing	北京女子图鉴	Youku	Miao Miao	Cameo
2018	The Destiny of White Snake	天乩之白蛇传说	iQIYI	Bai Yaoyao	
2018	Ashes of Love	香蜜沉沉烬如霜	Jiangsu TV, iQIYI, Youku, Tencent Video	Jin Mi	
2019	Go Go Squid!	亲爱的，热爱的	Dragon TV, Zhejiang TV, iQIYI, Tencent Video	Tong Nian	
2019	My Mowgli Boy	我的莫格利男孩	iQIYI, Shenzhen TV	Ling Xi	
2021	Dt. Appledog's Time	我的时代，你的时代	iQIYI	Tong Nian	Cameo
2021	Psychologist	女心理师	Youku, Jiangsu TV	He Dun	
2022	The Oath of Love	余生，请多指教	Tencent Video, Hunan TV, Shenzhen TV	Lin Zhixiao	
2022	Immortal Samsara	沉香如屑	Youku, Anhui TV	Yan Dan	
2022	Immortal Samsara	沉香重华	Youku	Yan Dan	
2022	He Dun's Happiness	贺顿的小可乐	Youku	He Dun	
2023	Lost You Forever S1	长相思 第一季	Tencent Video	Xiao Yao / Wen Xiaoliu	
2024	Love Endures	要久久爱	Youku, Jiangsu TV	Huang Yingzi	
2024	Best Choice Ever	承欢记	Tencent Video, CCTV-8	Mai Chenghuan	
2024	Lost You Forever S2	长相思 第二季	Tencent Video, Jiangsu TV	Xiao Yao / Wen Xiaoliu	
2025	Flourished Peony	国色芳华	Mango TV, Hunan TV	He Weifang / Mu Dan	
2025	In the Name of Blossom	锦绣芳华	Mango TV, Hunan TV	He Weifang / Mu Dan	
2026	Born to be Alive	生命树	iQIYI, CCTV-8	Bai Ju	
2026	The Heir	家业	iQIYI, CCTV-8	Li Zhen	
TBA	The Golden Hairpin	青簪行	Tencent Video	Huang Zixia / Yang Chonggu	
TBA	The Way You Come Back	玉兰花开君再来	Tencent Video	Dong Zhujun	

=== Short film ===
Year	English title	Chinese title	Role	Notes/Ref.
2016	17 Bring Joy Home	17把乐带回家	Yang Zi	Pepsi short film
2017	Today, She Has Anticipation Too	这一天，她是有期待的	Qiu Yingying	Ode to Joy special
2018	The Eve	前夕	Xiao Liu	Sina Entertainment's year-end special
2019	The Wind is Blowing	风在吹	Daughter	Lay's short film
2020	Hear Her	听见她说	Xiao Yu	Episode 2: "Wish for Love"

=== Variety shows ===
Year	English title	Chinese title	Network	Role	Notes/Ref.
2014	We Are Young 2	花样年华2	Jiangsu Television	Cast member	
2015	Sisters Over Flowers	花样姐姐	Dragon TV	Cast member	
2018	Give Me Five 2	高能少年团2	Zhejiang TV	Cast member	
2019	Chinese Restaurant 3	中餐厅3	Hunan TV	Cast member	
2021	The Detectives' Adventures	萌探探探案	iQIYI	Cast member	

== Discography ==
=== Albums ===
Year	English title	Chinese title	Notes/Ref.
2008	Home With Snow	家有小雪	

=== Soundtrack appearances ===
Year	English title	Chinese title	Album	Notes/Ref.
2009	"Grow a little everyday"	每天长大一点点	Don't Want to Grow Up OST	
2010	"Living Happily"	乐活一下	Good to be Living OST	with various singers
2012	"The Quiet Rubble"	寂静的瓦砾	Insistence OST	
2013	"Blooming Rouge"	胭脂花开	King Rouge OST	
2014	"I Will Remember You"	我会记得你	Battle of Changsha OST	with Wallace Huo
2016	"More Fragrant Than Flowers"	开的比花香	Ode to Joy OST	
2016	"There Will Be Happiness Waiting for You"	总有幸福在等你	Ode to Joy OST	with Liu Tao, Jiang Xin, Wang Ziwen & Qiao Xin
2016	"Just Like When We First Met"	若只如初见	Noble Aspirations 2 OST	
2017	"Kungfu Yoga"	功夫瑜伽	Kung Fu Yoga OST	with Jackie Chan & Zhang Yishan
2017	"Earthworm"	蚯蚓	Ode to Joy 2 OST	
2017	"Us"	我们	Ode to Joy 2 OST	with Liu Tao, Jiang Xin, Wang Ziwen & Qiao Xin
2018	"Few Lifetimes of Happiness"	几生欢	The Destiny of White Snake OST	
2018	"Unparalleled in the World"	天地无霜	Ashes of Love OST	with Deng Lun
2018	"Love Frost"	情霜	Ashes of Love OST	
2019	"Milk Bread"	牛奶面包	Go Go Squid! OST	
2019	"Breaking the Silence"	打破沉默	Bodies at Rest OST	with Richie Jen & MC Jin
2019	"Windy Night"	有风的夜晚	My Mowgli Boy OST	
2020	"My Homeland"	我的祖国	My People, My Homeland OST	with Wang Junkai, Roy Wang, Han Haolin & Jackie Li
2020	"Bring Your Own Breeze"	自带清风	Qing Feng (Breeze) Endorsement Song	with Mosaic Band
2021	"Flower Room Cafe"	花房咖啡厅	Psychologist OST	with pianist Wu Muye
2021	"Psychological Master"	心理大师	Psychologist OST	with Wang Jia & Jian Renzi
2022	"Someone Who Loves Someone"	一个人喜欢一个人	The Oath of Love OST	
2022	"The Oath of Love"	余生，请多指教	The Oath of Love OST	with Xiao Zhan
2022	"Watch The Day"	望辰	Immortal Samsara OST	
2023	"See and Miss One Another"	相见相思	Lost You Forever OST	
2023	"Favor Mortal Fireworks"	偏爱人间烟火	Lost You Forever OST	with Tan Jianci
2023	"A Vine On A Tall Mountain"	高高山上一根藤	Lost You Forever OST	
2024	"Flying Back to Childhood"	飞到小时候	Love Endures OST	
2024	"Appearance"	样子	Love Endures OST	with Stefanie Sun
2024	"It's Mom and Daughter"	是妈妈是女儿	Best Choice Ever OST	with He Saifei
2025	"Do Not Conform"	不逢不若	Flourished Peony OST	
2026	"Distant Mountain"	远山黛	The Heir OST	with Elvis Han

=== Other appearances ===
Year	English title	Chinese title	Notes/Ref.
2017	"Beautiful Youths of China"	美丽中国年	Performance for CCTV Spring Festival Gala
2018	"China"	中国	Theme song for China's Communist Youth League
2018	"The Future Me"	未来已来	Project for People's Republic of China's 70th anniversary
2019	"Dream"	梦想	Theme song for China Student Television Festival
2020	"Meeting in 20 Years Again"	再次相约二十年	Performance for CCTV Spring Festival Gala
2020	"The Figure of an Angel"	天使的身影	Tribute song for the COVID-19 Frontliners
2023	"The Flower Gardener"	花开种花家	Performance for CCTV Spring Festival Gala

== Accolades ==
=== Awards and nominations ===
Year	Nominated work	Award	Category	Result	Ref.
Major awards
2004	Girl's Diary	12th Tongniu Film Awards (China Huabiao Film Awards)	Best Child Actress	Nominated	
2013	Insistence	14th Golden Phoenix Awards	Best Newcomer	Won	
2017	Noble Aspirations	22nd Huading Awards	Best Actress (Ancient Drama)	Nominated	
2017	Ode to Joy	23rd Shanghai Television Festival	Best Supporting Actress	Nominated	
2018	Ode to Joy	29th China TV Golden Eagle Award	Best Actress	Nominated	
2018	Ashes of Love	24th Huading Awards	Best Actress (Ancient Drama)	Nominated	
2019	The Bravest	16th Guangzhou Student Film Festival	Most Popular Supporting Actress	Won	
2019	The Bravest	11th Macau International Movie Festival	Best Supporting Actress	Nominated	
2019	Go Go Squid!	6th The Actors of China Award Ceremony	Outstanding Actress (Emerald Category)	Won	
2019	Go Go Squid!	26th Huading Awards	Best Actress (Modern drama)	Won	
2019	Go Go Squid!	8th China Student Television Festival	Most Watched Actress	Won	
2020	The Bravest	35th Hundred Flowers Awards	Best Supporting Actress	Nominated	
2020	—N/a	7th The Actors of China Award Ceremony	Outstanding Actress (Emerald)	Won	
2022	Immortal Samsara	35th Huading Awards	Best Actress (Ancient Drama)	Nominated	
2024	Lost You Forever	29th Shanghai Television Festival	Best Actress	Nominated	
2024	Best Choice Ever	20th Chinese American Television Festival	Outstanding Actress	Won	
2024	Best Choice Ever	15th Macau International Television Festival	Best Actress	Nominated	
2025	Best Choice Ever	3rd China Media Group (CMG) Annual Chinese TV Drama Ceremony	Actress of the Year	Nominated	
2025	Flourished Peony	30th Shanghai Television Festival	Best Actress	Nominated	
2025	Flourished Peony	30th Shanghai Television Festival	Ambassador for Overseas Promotion of Chinese TV Programs	Won	
2025	In the Name of Blossom	16th Macau International Television Festival	Best Actress	Nominated	
2026	Flourished Peony	2nd China TV Drama Production Industry Conference Annual Ceremony	Actress of the Year	Nominated	
2026	Born to Be Alive	31st Shanghai Television Festival	Best Actress	Won	
2026	Born to Be Alive	33rd China TV Golden Eagle Award	Best Actress	Nominated	
2026	Born to Be Alive	22nd Chinese American Television Festival	Best Actress	Won	
Other awards
2016	—N/a	Baidu Fan Appreciation Season	Baidu Entertainment Person of the Year	Won	
2016	—N/a	8th China TV Drama Awards	Rising Actress	Won	
2017	—N/a	Weibo Award Ceremony	Popular Artist of the Year	Won	
2017	Ode to Joy	2nd China Quality Television Drama Awards	Best Collaboration (with Liu Tao, Jiang Xin, Wang Ziwen & Qiao Xin)	Won	
2017	—N/a	Weibo TV Online Video Award Ceremony	Breakthrough Artist	Won	
2018	—N/a	Weibo Night	Popular Artist of the Year	Won	
2018	Ashes of Love	Tencent Video All Star Awards	Popular TV Actress of the Year	Won	
2018	—N/a	Sohu Fashion Awards	Popular Female Celebrity	Won	
2018	—N/a	Jinri Toutiao Awards Ceremony	Most Noticed Female Celebrity	Won	
2019	—N/a	Weibo Night	Weibo Goddess	Won	
2019	Ashes of Love	Film and TV Role Model 2018 Annual Ranking	Popular Female Lead of the Year	Won	
2019	Ashes of Love	Tencent Entertainment White Paper	Popular Television Actress of the Year	Won	
2019	—N/a	China Value Zaker Influence Data Chart	Most Commercially Valuable Artist	Won	
2019	—N/a	Netease Entertainment Award	Best Actress	Won	
2019	Go Go Squid!, My Mowgli Boy	8th iQiyi All-Star Carnival	Scream Goddess	Won	
2019	Go Go Squid!, My Mowgli Boy	Weibo TV Series Awards	Most Popular Actress	Won	
2019	Go Go Squid!	Sina Film & TV Awards	Most Popular Actress	Won	
2019	Go Go Squid!	Film and TV Role Model 2019 Ranking	Most Popular Actress	Won	
2019	Go Go Squid!	Tencent Entertainment White Paper	Star Celebrity Board: Television Actress of the Year	Won	
2020	Go Go Squid!, The Bravest, Chinese Restaurant 3	Jinri Toutiao Awards Ceremony	All-Rounded Star of the Year	Won	
2020	Go Go Squid!, The Bravest, Chinese Restaurant 3	Weibo Night	Weibo Queen	Won	
2020	Go Go Squid!, The Bravest, Chinese Restaurant 3	Weibo Night	Popular Artist of the Year	Won	
2020	—N/a	Powerstar Award Ceremony	Most Influential Actress	Won	
2020	—N/a	Tencent Video All Star Night	VIP Star	Won	
2021	—N/a	Weibo Night	Weibo Queen	Won	
2021	Go Go Squid!	China Quality Television Drama Awards	All-round Quality Drama Star	Won	
2021	Go Go Squid!	China Quality Television Drama Awards	Quality Shining Drama Star	Won	
2021	—N/a	Harper's Bazaar Icons	Popular Icon Of The Year	Won	
2023	—N/a	Weibo Night	Most Expressive Actress	Won	
2023	—N/a	Harper's Bazaar Icons	Most Anticipated Icon	Won	
2023	Lost You Forever	Tencent Video All Star Night	TV Drama Actress of the Year	Won	
2023	Lost You Forever	Douban Annual TV Series Awards	Drama Actress of the Year	Won	
2024	Lost You Forever	Weibo Night	Most Appealing Actor of the Year	Won	
2024	Lost You Forever	Weibo Night	Weibo Queen	Won	
2024	Lost You Forever	Film and TV Role Model 2023 Annual Ranking	Most Popular Actress	Won	
2025	Best Choice Ever, Love Endures	Weibo Night	Nation's Favourite Actress of the Year	Won	
2025	Flourished Peony	GITV:Xiaomi TV Annual Ranking	Most Popular Actress	Won	
2026	Flourished Peony, In the Name of Blossom	Weibo Night	Annual Reputable Actress	Won	
2026	—N/a	VOGUE Forces of Fashion Gala	Inspirational Woman of the Year	Won	

=== Forbes China Celebrity 100 ===
Year	Rank	Ref.
2017	73rd	
2019	24th	
2020	13th	
2021	8th (Note: Forbes China Celebrity List ended in 2021 as platforms will no longer be able to publish lists of popular celebrity individuals.)	

=== Listicles ===
Year	Listicles	Rank	Ref.
2012	Huading Awards Public Image Satisfaction Survey: Emerging Chinese Actors	Placed	
2016	Southern Metropolis Daily Four Dan Actresses of the post-90s Generation	Placed	
2018	Forbes China 30 Under 30 Asia	Placed	
2020	The Beijing News Entertainment Person of the Year	Placed	
2020	Forbes Asia's 100 Digital Stars	Placed	
2021	Weibo Entertainment White Paper Most Commercially Valuable Star	1st	
2024	People (人物) Faces of the Year	Placed	
2024	People (人物) Actress of the Year	Won	
2024	Sohu Entertainment Most Likable Celebrity	1st	
2025	APEA Asia-Pacific U35 Industry Pioneer Leaders	Placed	
2025	APEA Asia-Pacific’s Most Influential Young Women Leaders	Placed	
2025	Weibo Vision Conference: 90s Television Actress' Backbone	Placed	
2025	Douban Annual Film List: Most Watched Actor	Placed	
