= Psychologist (TV series) =

Chinese urban television series

- Official poster
- Genre: Psychology; Slice-of-life; Romance
- Based on: Female Psychologist by Bi Shumin
- Written by: Zhu Li
- Directed by: Sam Quah
- Starring: Yang Zi; Jing Boran; Wang Jia; Jian Renzi
- Opening theme: "Psychological Master" by Kelly Chen
- Ending theme: "Flower House Cafe" by Yang Zi and Wu Muye
- Country of origin: China
- Original language: Mandarin
- No. of seasons: 1
- No. of episodes: 40; 8 (Special)

Production
- Producer: Guo Feng
- Production locations: Sanya, Hainan
- Running time: 45 mins
- Production companies: Yulele Pictures Co., Ltd

Original release
- Network: Youku
- Release: 23 November 2021 – 3 January 2022

Psychologist (Chinese: 女心理师; pinyin: Nǚ Xīn Lǐ Shī) is a 2021 Chinese television series directed by Malaysian Chinese director Sam Quah (柯汶利) and produced by Yulele Pictures Co., Ltd. The series is produced with a special fund for guiding and supporting television series in 2020 from the National Radio and Television Administration and is a key television series project supported by the Hainan Free Trade Port.

The series is based on Bi Shumin's 2007 novel Female Psychologist. Starring Yang Zi and Jing Boran, the series premiered on Youku on 23 November 2021 and ended its run on 3 January 2022. The remaining part He Dun's Happiness aired from 23 November to 8 December 2022.

== Cast ==
=== Main ===
- Yang Zi as He Dun
  - Ren Feier as young He Dun

A psychologist who had a painful childhood. Once worked at a Psychological Assistance Center and later started her own business. Due to Qian Kaiyi's constant persuasion, She decided to be a regular host of the radio show "Night Talks of the Heart". She had a crush on her high school classmate Qian Kaiyi.

- Jing Boran as Qian Kaiyi
  - Zheng Qianli as young Qian Kaiyi

Host of the popular radio show "Time Interview" but was replaced. To get back the show he started "Night Talks of the Heart" and invited He Dun to co-host the show with him. He likes He Dun.

- Wang Jia as Ye Jiahui
  - Yang Yunhan as young Ye Jiahui

He Dun and Tang Lili's neighbour. Qian Kaiyi's love rival. Deliberately approached He Dun for the "F" file.

- Jian Renzi as Tang Lili

He dun's best friend. Works in a high position of a company.

=== Supporting ===
- Ni Ping as Zhao Xiping

He Dun's mother

- Huang Jue as Ji Mingcong

He Dun's professor

- Ma Su as Anna

Young Zhao Xiping

- Yang Tongshu as Fu Tang

Client F. Ye Jiahui's mother

- Liu Xiaohai as Ye Jicheng

Ye Jiahui's adoptive father. Also known as Ye Niantang.

- Han Haolin as He Jun

He Dun's younger brother

== Production ==
On September 10, 2020, Psychologist announced Yang Zi and Jing Boran as the female and male protagonists. The series held a pre launching ceremony on October 31, 2020. Psychologist was launched on November 1, 2020, at 1st Hainan Satellite Television Industrial Summit. The series finished filming on March 11, 2021. The whole series was filmed in Sanya, Hainan.

== Soundtrack ==
No.	Title	Lyrics	Music	Singers	Length
1.	"Psychological Master (心理大师)" (Opening theme song)	Gou Lin	Liu Fengyao	Kelly Chen (version 1); Yang Zi, Wang Jia & Jian Renzi (version 2); Liu Fengyao (version 3)	03:48; 03:49 03:50
2.	"Flower House Cafe (时光笔墨)" (Ending theme song)	Gao Xiaoxi	Wu Muye	Yang Zi	03:31
3.	"Secret (小秘密)" (Interlude)	Rennie Wang	Rennie Wang	Rennie Wang (version 1); Lu Yupeng (version 2)	04:12; 03:08
4.	"For Love Longing (是对爱的渴望)" (Interlude)	Rennie Wang	Rennie Wang	房东的猫	03:01
5.	"I'm Doing Well Without You (没有你我现在过得很好)" (Interlude)	Bei Chi & Zhou Yanhong	Wang Heqi	Zhou Yanhong	03:00

== International broadcast ==
Channel	Location	Date
Astro Shuang Xing	Malaysia	23 November 2021
Line TV	Taiwan	1 January 2022
Taiwan Mobile	Taiwan	1 January 2022
RTHK TV 31	Hong Kong	8 March 2022
Longhua TV	Taiwan	12 April 2022
PLAYY	South Korea	25 April 2022
HTV7	Vietnam	30 April 2022
MONOMAX	Thailand	29 July 2022

== Special ==
Due to the 40-episode limit on Chinese dramas announced by the National Radio and Television Administration, Psychologist which was supposed to air with 48 episodes became 40 episodes. The remaining 8 episodes was renamed as He Dun's Happiness (贺顿的小可乐) and premiered on 23 November 2022 on the series's first anniversary and finished its run on 8 December 2022.

== Original novel ==
- Female Psychologist(女心理師)(ISBN 978-7513324540)
