= Yangko Dance =

Chinese TV series

- Genre: War; Drama; Romance
- Created by: Shandong Film and Television Media Group
- Screenplay by: Guo Jingyu; Xia Rensheng; Wang Qian
- Directed by: Guo Jingyu; Bai Shan; Liu Ling; Ju Xingmao
- Starring: Yang Zhigang; Yang Zi; Wang Kuirong; Wang Huichun
- Opening theme: Da Yang Ge Xu Qu (大秧歌序曲) by Sun Nan
- Ending theme: Dui Meng (追梦) by Tian Yuan
- Country of origin: China
- Original language: Chinese
- No. of seasons: 1
- No. of episodes: 79

Production
- Producers: Xue Xin; Liu Feng
- Running time: 45 minutes
- Production companies: Shandong Film and Television Media Group; Shandong Film & TV Production Co. Ltd. Beijing Perfect World Film and Television Culture Co. Ltd. Xi'an Aojinbai Film and Television Co. Ltd.

Original release
- Network: Jiangsu Satellite TV; Tianjin Satellite TV; Shandong Satellite TV
- Release: 26 October – 4 December 2015

Yangko Dance (Chinese: 大秧歌; pinyin: Dà Yāng Gē) is a 2015 Chinese television series directed by Guo Jingyu and produced by Shandong Film and Television Media Group. Starring Yang Zhigang and Yang Zi, the series was broadcast on Jiangsu TV and Tianjin TV from October 26 to December 4, 2015.

== Synopsis ==
A story inspired by Haiyang Yangge folk dance that follows a man who gets caught in the complications of family, love and revenge. In his journey, he transforms from a beggar to a hero who fights for his country.

In the year 1936, Hai Mao (Yang Zhigang) makes a living begging for alms on the streets as a fortune teller. His fate becomes intertwined with a young woman named Wu Ruoyun (Yang Zi). Eighteen years ago, pirate captain Hei Sha's (Zhao Hengxuan) parents were killed by Ruoyun's father Wu Qiankun (Wang Kuirong) and he is seeking revenge for their deaths. Hai Mao escapes with Wu Ruoyun in the night. Along the way, they encounter Wang Tiankai (Liu Zhibing) from the Communist underground who is on the run from his pursuers. Hai Mao carries Wang Tiankai on his back and nurses him back to health.

In the town of Hutouwan, the two great families Wu and Zhao have been enemies for generations. Hai Mao's arrival disrupts the yangke dance. He has come to look for his birth parents, and learns that he was born out of a forbidden romance between Zhao Yumei and Wu Mingyi, further complicating the story.

== Cast ==
=== Main ===
- Yang Zhigang as Hai Mao

Returned to Haiyang to find his parents but was caught in the complications of two big family. He transforms from a beggar to a hero who fights for his country.

- Yang Zi as Wu Ruoyun

Young Lady of Wu family. She is kind, cute and patriotic. When Hai Mao was drowned in the sea, Wu Ruoyun rescued him together with Zhao Xiangyu.

- Wang Kuirong as Wu Qiankun

Patriarch of Wu family, one of the two big families in Haiyang. Wu Ruoyun's father.

- Liu Qianhan as Zhao Xiangyu

A fisherwoman. She was the maid of Zhao Hongsheng's sister Zhao Yumei. Rescued Hai Mao together with Wu Ruoyun.

- Wang Huichun as Zhao Hongsheng

Patriarch of Zhao family, one of the two big families in Haiyang.

- Xuan Lu as Huai Hua

Maid of Wu Ruoyun. She has a simple personality.

=== Supporting ===
- Zhang Shaohua as Wu Mu
- Liu Zhibing as Wang Tiankai
- Liu Zhiyang as Zhao Zixuan
- Chen Jie as Zhu Yeqing
- Jia Yuanyuan as Chun Caoer
- Niu Beiren as Zhao Dalu
- Zhao Hengxuan as Hei Sha
- Xiao Yin as Xiao Su
- Kou Jiarui as Lin Jiayao
- Jia Hongwei as Wu Tianwang
- Niu Shengwen as Wu Guanjia
- Xing Mao Ju as Lu Renjia
- Bao Chunxiao as Lu Renyi
- Yue Lina as Wu Xiangyue
- Song Yi as Wu Ziyue

== Ratings ==
Broadcast date	Episode	Jiangsu TV CSM50 ratings			Tianjin TV CSM52 ratings		
Broadcast date	Episode	Ratings(%)	Audience share (%)	Rank	Ratings (%)	Audience share(%)	Rank
2015.10.26	1-2	0.734	2.024	6	0.571	1.581	10
2015.10.27	3-4	0.661	1.874	6	0.584	1.663	9
2015.10.28	5-6	0.725	2.043	6	0.641	1.808	9
2015.10.29	7-8	0.747	2.069	6	0.707	1.954	7
2015.10.30	9-10	0.753	2.02	6	0.648	1.74	8
2015.10.31	11-12	0.703	1.87	7	0.586	1.56	8
2015.11.01	13-14	0.76	2.03	6	0.566	1.52	10
2015.11.02	15-16	0.78	2.15	5	0.618	1.71	8
2015.11.03	17-18	0.875	2.43	6	0.686	1.91	7
2015.11.04	19-20	0.927	2.56	3	0.69	1.91	8
2015.11.05	21-22	0.934	2.55	2	0.809	2.21	5
2015.11.06	23-24	0.929	2.45	2	0.839	2.21	4
2015.11.07	25-26	1.094	2.84	2	0.941	2.44	4
2015.11.08	27-28	1.14	3.04	1	0.979	2.62	2
2015.11.09	29-30	1.056	2.92	1	0.914	2.53	2
2015.11.10	31-32	0.975	2.66	1	0.908	2.48	3
2015.11.11	33-34	1.029	2.8	1	0.897	2.45	3
2015.11.12	35-36	1.091	2.88	1	0.942	2.48	2
2015.11.13	37-38	1.088	2.87	2	1.088	2.88	2
2015.11.14	39-40	1.084	2.91	2	1.092	2.93	1
2015.11.15	41-42	0.918	2.42	5	1.187	3.11	1
2015.11.16	43-44	1.022	2.75	2	1.135	3.06	1
2015.11.17	45-46	1.164	3.020	1	1.053	2.73	2
2015.11.18	47-48	0.995	2.67	3	1.162	3.110	1
2015.11.19	49-50	0.976	2.6	3	1.131	3.01	1
2015.11.20	51-52	1.161	3.06	2	1.186	3.12	1
2015.11.21	53-54	1.118	2.86	2	1.188	3.04	1
2015.11.22	55-56	1.219	3.14	2	1.428	3.66	1
2015.11.23	57-58	1.085	2.87	2	1.205	3.19	1
2015.11.24	59-60	1.147	3.01	4	1.206	3.16	2
2015.11.25	61-62	1.301	3.39	2	1.343	3.5	1
2015.11.26	63-64	1.296	3.44	1	1.186	3.14	4
2015.11.27	65-66	1.344	3.55	1	1.179	3.1	3
2015.11.28	67-68	1.135	2.96	4	1.223	3.19	1
2015.11.29	69-70	1.295	3.41	2	1.456	3.82	1
2015.11.30	71-72	1.141	3.04	5	1.333	3.55	3
2015.12.01	73-74	1.21	3.17	5	1.243	3.25	4
2015.12.02	75-76	1.277	3.35	4	1.331	3.5	3
2015.12.03	77-78	1.214	3.13	5	1.298	3.34	4
2015.12.04	79	1.249	3.26	4	1.44	3.77	3
Average ratings		1.249			1.44		

== Production ==
The series was launched on 27 July 2014. The filming took place in Beijing and Haiyang, Shandong province. After 344 days of filming, the series wrapped up on 5 July 2015 in Beijing.

== Soundtrack ==
No.	Title	Lyrics	Singers	Length
1.	"Da Yang Ge Xu Qu (大秧歌序曲)" (Opening theme song)	Chen Xi	Sun Nan
2.	"Dui Meng (追梦)" (Ending theme song)	Chen Xi	Tian Yuan

== Reception ==
This series has received much attention since the beginning of its broadcast and it continued to dominate the screen. Within 21 days of its broadcast, it became the Provincial Television Prime Ratings Champion in Jiangsu and Tianjin Satellite TV, maintaining top 5 positions till the end of the broadcast. The drama was praised for its strong plots and excellent performances. The series has reached over 6 billion online view.

== Awards and nominations ==
Year	Awards	Category	Result	Ref.
2016	Chinese TV Drama Quality Ceremony	Quality TV Drama	Nominated	
2016	Chinese TV Drama Quality Ceremony	Audience's Favorite TV Drama	Nominated	
2017	11th Television Production Industry Award	Outstanding TV Drama	Won	
2017	12th Spiritual Civilization Construction "Literary and Artistic Quality Project"	Outstanding Work	Won	
