= Andy Yang =

Andy Yang may refer to:

- Andrew Yang (born 1975), American businessman, politician, and author
- Yang Zi (actress) (born 1992), Chinese actress, singer and model
