= Weibo Awards =

Chinese Award Show

- Awarded for: Annual inventory and selection of hot people and hot events of the year
- Country: China
- Presented by: Sina Weibo
- First award: 2004

Television/radio coverage
- Network: Sina

Weibo Awards (Chinese: 微博之夜), also known as Weibo Night, is a comprehensive honor ceremony hosted by Sina in mainland China. It was founded in 2004. The honor ceremony is a comprehensive honor ceremony for the annual inventory and selection of hot people and hot events of the year. It was formerly known as Sina.com Top Ten News Selection of the Year, Sina Network China Annual Selection, and Sina Network Ceremony.

The important awards of Weibo Night are: Film of the Year, TV Series of the Year and Director of the Year. The honor results are determined by Sina Weibo's annual "Weibo Index" to determine the candidates for each honor, and then make the final evaluation based on the number of votes of the candidates' netizens and comprehensive expert opinions.

== History ==
Since 2000, every December, Sina and Southern Weekly will host the "Southern Weekend-Sina Annual Person Selection"; since 2002, every January, Sina and Xinhuanet will held the "Annual Top 10 Domestic and International News Selection Activities". These two annual selection activities are also the embryonic form of Weibo Night.

In January 2004, Sina teamed up with Southern Weekly and Xinhuanet to hold the "Sina.com 2003 Top Ten News Selection Awards Gala (1st Weibo Night)".

In December 2004, Southern Weekly began to independently hold the "Person of the Year Selection"; in the same month, Xinhuanet stopped holding the "Annual Top 10 Domestic and International News Selection Activities".

In January 2005, it officially changed its name to "Sina Network China Annual Selection Awards Gala", and Sina independently held "Sina 2004 Network China Annual Selection Awards Gala (2nd Weibo Night)".

In January 2006, it officially changed its name to "Sina Network Festival" and held "Sina 2005 Network Festival (3rd Weibo Night)".

In January 2007, Sina joined hands with a TV platform for the first time, and the Sina 2006 Network Ceremony (the 4th Weibo Night) was broadcast on Jiangxi Satellite TV.

In January 2012, it officially changed its name to "Weibo Night" and held "2011 Weibo Night (9th Weibo Night)". In the same year, Zhejiang Weibo Night [11] was added.

In January 2013, Hubei Weibo Night and Anhui Weibo Night [13] were added.

In January 2017, Shaanxi Weibo Night was added.

In December 2019, Hunan Weibo Night was added.

== Selection rules ==
There are 5 lists in Weibo Night, namely Annual Event, Annual Person, Annual Buzzword, Weibo King, and Weibo Queen. These include the hot events and figures that attracted the most attention from netizens on Weibo last year. According to the microblog topic popularity value corresponding to the event (or person) on the list and the personal microblog reading volume, the ranking is selected, classified and sorted into the list. The ranking is determined by netizens' voting.

The specific voting method of netizens is as follows:

=== Direct voting ===
Users log in to Weibo via computer or Weibo mobile client, and click the voting buttons for annual event, annual person, annual buzzword, Weibo King, and Weibo Queen to participate in voting. Each user has 10 voting opportunities per day; participating in voting for 5 consecutive days, the daily voting opportunities will increase to 15 votes; participating in voting for 10 consecutive days, the daily voting opportunities will increase to 20 votes; the daily user's regular votes are used up, you can do tasks Continue canvassing.

=== Weibo King and Weibo Queen canvass votes ===
Oasis app: Before 0:00 on January 1 of the year of the event, users log in to the Oasis app and click on the guardian of the corresponding artist on the event page to add 15 votes for the corresponding artist; each user can solicit votes for each artist once a day through the Oasis app. After 0:00 on January 1 of the holding year, the user logs in to the Oasis app, and clicks to protect the corresponding artist on the event page, and 50 votes can be added to the corresponding artist; each user can canvass for different artists once a day through the Oasis app.

Chaohua Community: Users can add 10 votes to the corresponding artist through 3 interactions with the corresponding artist. Each user can solicit votes for different artists once a day through the Chaohua community.

Sina News Client: Users can add 10 votes for the corresponding artist by commenting on the corresponding artist news 3 times on the Sina News client. Each user can solicit votes for different artists once a day through the Sina News client.

Fan group: Join any fan group of the corresponding artist, and speak once in any fan group, which can increase 10 votes for the corresponding artist. Each user can solicit votes for different artists once a day through the fan group.

One live broadcast: watch the live broadcast for 2 minutes on the Yi live view client, and you can add 10 votes to an artist every day. Each user can only solicit votes for 1 artist once a day.

=== Time-limited voting for Weibo King and Weibo Queen ===
From 00:00 on January 11 to 20:00 on January 11 of the host year, you can get one voting opportunity every 5 minutes; the number of votes within 5 minutes is valid and will not be accumulated.

=== Soliciting votes on the character list ===
From 00:00 on December 20 to 0:00 on January 1 of the year when the user logs in to the Oasis app, click on the support for the corresponding character on the event page to add 15 votes to the character; Canvass 1 time. After 0:00 on January 1 of the holding year, the user logs in to the Oasis app, clicks to support the corresponding character on the event page, and 50 votes can be added to the corresponding character; each user can solicit votes for different characters once a day through the Oasis app.

Note: The above are the selection rules for Weibo Night 2019.

== Ceremony ==
Edition	Date	Hosts	Venue City	Refs
1st	January 5, 2004	Yaning and Lu Jian	Beijing Guoan Theater	
2nd	January 12, 2005	Yuan Ming and Wu Dawei	Beijing Century Theater	
3rd	January 10, 2006	Xie Na and Wu Dawei	Beijing Century Theater	
4th	January 17, 2007	Chen Chen and Sun Guoqing	Beijing Chang'an Grand Theater	
5th	January 17, 2008	Li Xiaofeng and Hu Yihu	Beijing Chang'an Grand Theater	
6th	January 19, 2009	Hu Yihu and Zhu Dan	Beijing's Mei Lanfang Grand Theater	
7th	January 21, 2010	Liang Yongbin and Zhu Dan	China National Swimming Center	
8th	January 19, 2011	Liang Yongbin and Xie Na	China World Trade Center	
9th	January 4, 2012	Hua Shao and Li Ai	China World Trade Center	
10th	January 14, 2013	Hua Shao and Li Ai	China World Trade Center	
11th	January 15, 2014	Meng Fei and Zhu Dan	China World Trade Center	
12th	January 15, 2015	Hua Shao and Li Ai	China World Trade Center	
13th	January 7, 2016	Hua Shao and Li Ai	National Convention Center	
14th	January 16, 2017	Hua Shao and Li Ai	China National Swimming Center	
15th	January 18, 2018	Hua Shao and Li Ai	Beijing Cadillac Center	
16th	January 11, 2019			
17th	January 11, 2020	Nigmat Reheman and Li Ai	Beijing National Aquatics Center	
18th	January 28, 2021	Nigmat Reheman, Li Ai and Si Wenjia	Shanghai Mercedes-Benz Cultural Center	

== Movie of the Year and TV Series of the Year ==
Year	Edition	Movie of the Year	TV Series of the Year
2004	1st	Cell Phone	The Legend of the Condor Heroes
2004	1st	Cell Phone	Xiaozhuang Mishi
2004	1st	Cell Phone	Jade Goddess of Mercy
2005	2nd	–	Demi-Gods and Semi-Devils
2005	2nd	–	Chinese Style Divorce
2006	3rd	The Promise	Drawing Sword
2006	3rd	–	Chinese Paladin
2007	4th	Curse of the Golden Flower	My Own Swordsman
2007	4th	–	Ansuan
2008	5th	The Warlords	Soldiers Sortie
2008	5th	The Warlords	Five Star Hotel
2009	6th	Forever Enthralled	–
2010	7th	The Founding of a Republic	–
2011	8th	Aftershock	Before Dawn
2012	9th	Love Is Not Blind	Men
2013	10th	–	–
2014	11th	–	–
2015	12th	–	–
2016	13th	–	–
2017	14th	I Am Not Madame Bovary	Ode to Joy
2017	14th	I Am Not Madame Bovary	A Love For Separation
2017	14th	Soul Mate	The Princess Weiyoung
2017	14th	Soul Mate	Ice Fantasy
2018	15th	Wolf Warrior 2	In the Name of the People
2018	15th	Youth	In the Name of the People
2018	15th	Twenty Two	Day and Night
2019	16th	Dying to Survive	Story of Yanxi Palace
2019	16th	Operation Red Sea	Ashes of Love
2020	17th	My People, My Country	The Longest Day In Chang'an
2020	17th	The Captain	The Untamed
2020	17th	Better Days	Go Go Squid!

Note: – means there was no winner that year

== Weibo King & Queen ==
Weibo King & Queen are selected by Sina Weibo users through voting and are awarded to the male and female celebrities who receive the highest number of votes each year. Starting from 2022, professional judges were added to the selection process.

Year	Weibo King	Weibo Queen
2010	Kevin Tsai	Yao Chen
2011	Feng Shaofeng	Yang Mi
2012	Nicky Wu	Yao Chen
2013	Chen Kun	Liu Shishi
2014	Lu Han	Angelababy
2015	Kris Wu	Zhao Liying
2016	TFBOYS	Fan Bingbing
2017	Deng Chao	Yang Mi
2018	Not awarded	
2019	Xiao Zhan	Yang Zi
2020	Xiao Zhan	Yang Zi
2021	Not awarded	
2022	Hu Ge	Liu Yifei
2023	Zhu Yilong	Yang Zi
2024	Shen Teng	Zhao Liying

== The most awarded ==
Name	Frequency	Details
Woman with the Most Awards
Angelababy	10 times	Fashion Person of the Year (2013)
Angelababy	10 times	Goddess of the Year (2014)
Angelababy	10 times	Goddess of the Year (2015)
Angelababy	10 times	Weibo Queen (2015)
Angelababy	10 times	Outstanding Public Welfare Person of the Year (2016)
Angelababy	10 times	Starlight Charity Influential Figure (2018)
Angelababy	10 times	Hot Search Artist of the Year (2018)
Angelababy	10 times	Weibo Goddess of the Year (2020)
Angelababy	10 times	Star of the Year (2021)
Angelababy	10 times	Annual Quality Actor (2023)
Yang Zi	10 times	Popular Artist of the Year (2017)
Yang Zi	10 times	Popular Artist of the Year (2018)
Yang Zi	10 times	Weibo Goddess (2019)
Yang Zi	10 times	Weibo Queen (2020)
Yang Zi	10 times	Popular Artist of the Year (2020)
Yang Zi	10 times	Weibo Queen (2021)
Yang Zi	10 times	Most Expressive Actor (2023)
Yang Zi	10 times	Most Appealing Actor of the Year (2024)
Yang Zi	10 times	Weibo Queen (2024)
Yang Zi	10 times	Nation's Favourite Actress of the Year (2025)
Men with the Most Awards
Chen Kun	5 times	The Most Influential Film Actor of the Year (2012)
Chen Kun	5 times	Annual Public Welfare Contribution (2014)
Chen Kun	5 times	Weibo King (2014)
Chen Kun	5 times	The 16th session in 2019: Starlight Charity Influencer (2019)
Chen Kun	5 times	Weibo Social Influencer (2019)
Guo Jingming	5 times	Fashion Network Writer of the Year (2005)
Guo Jingming	5 times	Emerging Writer of the Year (2008)
Guo Jingming	5 times	Annual Breakthrough (2014)
Guo Jingming	5 times	Annual Attraction (2014)
Guo Jingming	5 times	Breakthrough of the Year (2015)
Director with the Most Awards
Feng Xiaogang	4 times	Director of the Year (2005)
Feng Xiaogang	4 times	Director of the Year (2008)
Feng Xiaogang	4 times	Director of the Year (2012)
Feng Xiaogang	4 times	Director of the Year (2017)
