= Best Choice Ever =

2024 Chinese television series

- 承欢记
- Genre: Urban; Family; Business; Romance comedy
- Based on: Story of Joy by Yi Shu
- Written by: Li Jingling; Wu Xiangling; Hu Xiaoyu; Zhang Xiaojing
- Directed by: Tian Yu
- Starring: Yang Zi; Xu Kai
- Ending theme: "It's Mom and Daughter" by He Saifei & Yang Zi
- Country of origin: China
- Original language: Mandarin
- No. of seasons: 1
- No. of episodes: 37

Production
- Production locations: Shanghai, Anhui
- Editor: Dong Chuanhui
- Running time: 45 minutes
- Production companies: Zhejiang Huace Film & TV Co. Ltd. Tencent Penguin Pictures

Original release
- Network: CCTV-8; Tencent Video
- Release: 9 April – 27 April 2024

Best Choice Ever (Chinese: 承欢记; pinyin: Chéng Huān Jì) is a 2024 Chinese urban television series directed by Tian Yu and produced by Huace Media and Tencent Penguin Pictures. It stars Yang Zi as Mai Chenghuan and Xu Kai as Yao Zhiming in the lead roles.

The series is based on the novel "Story of Joy" by Yi Shu and tells the story of a young woman who is looking for a balance between herself and her family relationships as she grows up. The series premiered on CCTV-8 and Tencent Video on 9 April and ended its run on 27 April.

== Plot ==
The series follows the story of Mai Chenghuan (played by Yang Zi), a young woman from a typical Shanghai family whose life has always been controlled by her overbearing mother. She meets Yao Zhiming (played by Xu Kai), her boss and also the biological grandson of her step-grandmother at her workplace, Botticelli Hotel. Their contrasting personalities and misunderstandings create tension between them. At home, she faces pressure from her mother, Liu Wanyu (played by He Saifei), to discuss marriage with her boyfriend, Xin Jialiang. Differences in family backgrounds and excessive parental involvement lead to their breakup, motivating Chenghuan to assert her independence and focus on her career. She later inherits Xing'anli Hotel from her step-grandmother, which brings her into contact with Yao Zhiming again. When they reunite, their initial friction persists, but through teamwork and mutual support, they begin to understand each other better and fall in love.

Chenghuan goes through a character development where she goes from living under her mother's authority to becoming independent while still remaining filial. She embarks on a journey of career advancement and romance, discovering her own path along the way.

== Cast ==
=== Main ===
- Yang Zi as Mai Chenghuan
- Xu Kai as Yao Zhiming

=== Supporting ===
- He Saifei as Liu Wanyu
- Yao Anlian as Mai Laitian
- Zhang Yao as Mai Chengzao
- Xu Lingyue as Mao Yongxin
- Wu Yanshu as Chen Shuzhen
- Niu Junfeng as Xin Jialiang
- Guo Yunqi as He Dong
- Xu Yajun as Xin Zhishan
- Deng Ying as Chen Dejing
- Hu Dandan as Xin Jiali
- Gong Beibi as Zhang Peishang
- He Fengtian as Zou Nan
- Lu Zhaohua as Zhang Ziyu
- Wang Ziwei as Zhu Baoqiao
- Bao Chenxi as Qian Duoduo
- Wang Chuyu as Tian Feng

== Production ==
The series started filming on June 18, 2023, and was completed on September 23 of the same year. In order to play the role of Mai Chenghuan better, Yang Zi specifically learned the Shanghai dialect of Mandarin and the lives of Shanghai girls of Chenghuan's age. To make the character of Mai Chenghuan more vivid, the creators visited the alleys, coffee shops and other local places of Shanghai to observe the clothing styles of young women and took inspiration from them to create the makeup style of Mai Chenghuan. The crew created an alley based on Sanheli and an old house based on Sinan Mansion completely. A total of 117 scenes were filmed in Shanghai.

== Reception ==
The series won the Most Anticipated Work award at the 2023 Tencent Video Starlight Awards. The series premiered on CCTV-8 on April 9, 2024, and was simultaneously broadcast on Tencent Video. The first episode of the drama had a real-time audience rating of over 2, with a peak of 2.0584%. The popularity of the series on Tencent Video has exceeded 30,519, setting a new record for the highest popularity of urban dramas on the site.

== Soundtrack ==
No.	Title	Lyrics	Music	Singers	Length
1.	"It's mother and Daughter" (Ending theme song)	Tang Tian	Qian Lei	Yang Zi; He Saifei
2.	"How to love" (Growth theme song)	Chen Shu	Dong Dongdong	Yu Kewei
3.	"Good night" (Accompany theme song)	Zhang Ying	Cheng Shijia	Hu Xia
4.	"Remember" (Heartbeat theme song)	Zhang Ying	Luo Kun	Zhou Shen
5.	"Years, hours and minutes" (Love theme song)	Wang Aiqing	Sun Aili	Jin Minqi
6.	"Surround"	Kim Eunhee	Kim Eunhee	Liu Limin
7.	"Little monsters"			Xu Jiayi; Xu Jiahe
8.	"Who would have thought that he would become the number one scholar in the imperial examination?"	Lu Hongfei	Fang Jifu; Shi Bailin; Wang Wenzhi	He Saifei

== Ratings ==
CCTV-8 CVB ratings
Episodes	Air dates	Ratings (%)	Audience Share (%)	Ranking	Notes
1-8	9 April — 12 April	1.513%	5.912%	3	
9-22	13 April — 19 April	1.775%	6.821%	2	
23-36	20 April — 26 April	1.830%	7.020%	2	
37	27 April	1.925%	7.535%	2	
Average		1.743%			

== Accolades ==
Year	Award	Category	Nominee(s)	Result	Ref.
2023	Tencent Video Starlight Award	Most Anticipated TV Series	Best Choice Ever	Won	
2024	20th Chinese American TV Festival	Chinese Cultural Communication Award	Best Choice Ever	Won	
2024	20th Chinese American TV Festival	Outstanding Actress	Yang Zi	Won	
2024	20th Chinese American TV Festival	Outstanding Actor	Xu Kai	Won	
2024	15th Macau International Television Festival	Best Actress	Yang Zi	Nominated	
2024	15th Macau International Television Festival	Best Supporting Actress	He Saifei	Nominated	
2024	15th Macau International Television Festival	Best Supporting Actor	Yao Anlian	Nominated	
2025	Tencent Video Golden Goose Award	VIP Member's Favourite TV Series	Best Choice Ever	Won	
2025	Tencent Video Golden Goose Award	Annual Hit TV Series	Best Choice Ever	Won	
2025	3rd China Media Group (CMG) Annual Chinese TV Drama Ceremony	Outstanding Drama of the Year	Best Choice Ever	Nominated	
2025	3rd China Media Group (CMG) Annual Chinese TV Drama Ceremony	Annual Hit Drama Overseas	Best Choice Ever	Nominated	
2025	3rd China Media Group (CMG) Annual Chinese TV Drama Ceremony	Actress of the Year	Yang Zi	Nominated	
2025	Kuyun Annual Influence Ceremony	Annual Influential TV Series	Best Choice Ever	Won	
2025	Kuyun Annual Influence Ceremony	Popular TV Series of the Year	Best Choice Ever	Won	
2025	Kuyun Annual Influence Ceremony	Annual Hit TV Series (CCTV Category)	Best Choice Ever	Won	
2025	Kuyun Annual Influence Ceremony	Influential Women of the Year	Mai Chenghuan	Won	
2025	Kuyun Annual Influence Ceremony	Popular Female Character of the Year	Mai Chenghuan	Won	
2025	Kuyun Annual Influence Ceremony	Popular Male Character of the Year	Yao Zhiming	Won	
2025	Kuyun Annual Influence Ceremony	Annual Influential Producer	Yang Liu	Won	
2025	China Radio and Television Audiovisual Masterpiece Night	Audiovisual China Global Broadcast	Best Choice Ever	Won	
