= The Bravest =

2019 Chinese disaster film

- Theatrical release poster
- Chinese: 烈火英雄
- Literal meaning: Raging-Fire Hero
- Hanyu Pinyin: lièhuǒ yīngxióng
- Directed by: Tony Chan
- Written by: Yu Yonggan; Tony Chan
- Based on: Tears are The Deepest Waters by Bao'erji Yuanye
- Produced by: Andrew Lau; Peggy Lee
- Starring: Huang Xiaoming; Du Jiang; Tan Zhuo; Yang Zi; Ou Hao
- Cinematography: Kokei Leung
- Edited by: Wenders Li; Barfuss Hui
- Music by: Peter Kam
- Production companies: Columbia Pictures Film Production Asia; Bona Film Group; Alibaba Pictures; Huaxia Film Distribution; Asia-Pacific Chinese Film (Beijing) Pictures Co., Ltd
- Distributed by: Bona Film Group
- Release date: August 1, 2019
- Running time: 120 minutes
- Country: China
- Language: Mandarin
- Budget: CN¥380 million (US$55 million)
- Box office: CN¥1.7 billion (US$244 million)

The Bravest (Chinese: 烈火英雄) is a 2019 Chinese disaster film directed by Tony Chan and starring Huang Xiaoming, Du Jiang, Tan Zhuo, Yang Zi, and Ou Hao. Based on the Xingang Port oil spill incident and later adapted as the non-fiction book Tears are The Deepest Waters (Chinese: 最深的水是泪水) written by Bao'erji Yuanye, the film chronicles firefighters' efforts to protect a city from a fire caused by an oil pipeline explosion.

The film is one of the seven films that premiered during the 70th anniversary of the People's Republic of China. It was released in China on August 1, 2019, and in the United States on August 9. The film grossed over CN¥1.7 billion (US$244 million) in China.

== Synopsis ==
A pipeline explosion at a coastal city oil terminal implicated the entire crude oil storage area. An oil storage tank with a storage capacity of up to 100,000 cubic meters has exploded and leaked. The leaked crude oil may detonate nearby oil tanks at any time, and the fire continues to escalate. Explosions occurred one after another, but this was not the most terrifying thing. The dangerous chemical storage area standing not far from the fire scene was like a devil waiting to be ignited. It could take away the lives of millions of people in an instant, threatening the whole city, province, and even the security of neighboring countries. In such critical moments, groups of firefighters bid farewell to their families and rush to the fire scene.

== Cast ==
- Huang Xiaoming as Jiang Liwei
- Du Jiang as Ma Weiguo
- Tan Zhuo as Li Fang, Jiang Liwei's wife
- Yang Zi as Wang Lu
- Ou Hao as Xu Xiaobin
- Hou Yong as Wu Chenguang
- Liu Jinshan as citizen
- Ding Jiali
- Gu Jiacheng as Zhou Hao
- Yin Xiaotian as Wei Lei
- Gao Ge as Weng Weng
