= My Mowgli Boy =

Chinese television series

- Chinese: 我的莫格利男孩
- Genre: Romance; Comedy; Environmental protection
- Written by: Liu Fei; Liu Chenguang; Shi Shi
- Directed by: Peng Xuejun
- Starring: Ma Tianyu; Yang Zi
- Opening theme: You are like the Wind by Jin Wenqi
- Ending theme: Windy Night by Yang Zi
- Country of origin: China
- Original language: Mandarin
- No. of seasons: 1
- No. of episodes: 50

Production
- Producers: Yan Zheng; Wang Yexun; Wang Jing; Yao Yuanhong
- Running time: 45 minutes
- Production company: Croton Media

Original release
- Network: iQiyi
- Release: August 29 – October 10, 2019

My Mowgli Boy (Chinese: 我的莫格利男孩) is a 2019 Chinese urban romance comedy television series directed by Peng Xuejun. It stars Ma Tianyu as Mowgli and Yang Zi as Ling Xi in the lead roles. It premiered on iQIYI on August 29, 2019 and finished broadcasting on October 10, 2019. It also aired primetime on Shenzhen Satellite TV starting from April 12, 2020.

The series tells the story of Mo Ge Li, a boy raised in the jungle by the forest caretaker, who is accidentally brought into the city by Ling Xi, an independent entrepreneurial woman and called on people to protect the environment.

== Plot summary ==
Mo Ge Li (played by Ma Tianyu) is a boy who was raised in the forest by his grandfather who was the forest caretaker. He grew up playing with animals in the forest since childhood. Ling Xi (played by Yang Zi), an independent career-focused woman, took Mo Ge Li back to the city by mistake. She wanted to send Mo Ge Li back to the forest as soon as possible, but she had to keep him around because of the marketing needs of her studio. Ling Xi and Mo Ge Li lived under the same roof, and the two gradually developed feelings for each other. As a bridge between human beings and nature, with the help of Ling Xi, Mo Ge Li gradually learned how to integrate into modern social life. Ling Xi learned the philosophy of nature from Mo Ge Li, and joined the ranks of those working for ecological protection to save the environment. The two learned from each other and grew together.

== Casts and Characters ==
=== Main cast ===
Actor	Character	Introduction	Ref.
Ma Tianyu	Mo Ge Li / Xia Ye	A boy who grew up in the forest, who is simple-minded but very principled and does not like to be deceived and used by others. His only relative in the forest is the forest caretaker grandpa. He came to the city with Ling Xi due to an accident, and then lived with Ling Xi. He is Chu Shi's long-lost brother. He likes Ling Xi.	
Yang Zi	Ling Xi	She is the founder of fashion design company Xixi Ling Studio - a woman of the new era. She is Ling Yu's non-biological sister and Zheng Li's childhood sweetheart - Ling Xi was secretly in love with Zheng Li for 20 years, but then gradually fell in love with Mo Ge Li.	
Ren Yankai	Zheng Li	He is the General Manager of Wolf Media Group and Ling Xi's childhood sweetheart. He is the boss of Bai Yiling, who he likes. Public opinion in the outside world did not affect Zheng Li's judgment. He still followed his heart and let people see the simple beauty of love.	
Fu Mengbo	Lu Ziyue	He is Zheng Li's former roommate and good friend. He is a lawyer and university professor. He likes Tang Cheng.	
Huang Cancan	Tang Cheng	She is Ling Xi's best friend and is a lawyer. Tang Cheng's parents are wildlife photographers, so she has traveled to many places. Later, with Ling Xi's support, she begins a relationship with Lu Ziyue.	
Wang Zhener	Bai Yiling	Bai Yiling and Chi Xu were originally husband and wife and jointly owned a company. Later, Ji Xu cheated and had a child with another woman, Xiao Yao. Bai Yiling filed for divorce, left Chi Xu, joined Wolf Media Group, and became Zheng Li's assistant. After Zheng Li confessed to her, the two established their relationship.	
Wu Haoze	Ling Yu	Ling Xi's older stepbrother. Ling Yu was engaged with Gao Jie but later called it off. He likes Zhu Shi and helped her when she couldn't find a place to stay.	
Zheng Qiuhong	Zhu Shi	Mo Ge Li's younger sister. Zhu Shi came to China against her parents approval. She likes Ling Yu.	

=== Supporting cast ===
Actor	Character	Introduction
Fu Rou Meiqi	Tu Tu	Ling Xi's assistant
Jing Yanjun	Li Kai	Ling Xi's assistant
Mai Tong	Ren He	Ling Xi's assistant
Yin Zhusheng	Zheng Weijue	Zheng Li's father
Denny Huang	Li Yuhang	CEO of a company. Later became Mo Ge Li's boss.
Lu Gang	Ling Zhenghao	Ling Xi and Ling Yu's father
Cao Yi	Ding Jianxiong	Ling Yu's birth father

== Reception ==
The series was praised for its concept of environmental protection, and its sense of fashion in clothing.

== Soundtrack ==
The series has 7 original soundtracks in total. The opening theme song "You are Like the Wind" was sung by singer Jin Wenqi and the ending theme song "Windy Night" was sung by the lead actress of the series Yang Zi.

No.	Title	Lyrics	Music	Singers	Length
1.	"You are like the Wind (你像风来了)" (Opening theme song)	Guo Yanduo; Weng Weiying	Weng Weiying; Huang Allen	Jin Wenqi	4:22
2.	"Windy Night (有风的夜晚)" (Ending theme song)	Gong Jiacheng	Zheng Yujie	Yang Zi	3:00
3.	"Reverse (颠倒)"	Gong Jiacheng	Zheng Yujie	房东的猫	4:24
4.	"Not Just a Vignette (不只是一首小插曲)"			Yu Jiayun	3:51
5.	"Listen to me talk (听我说说)"	Chen Weiru	Chen Weiru	Zhao Tianyu	4:21
6.	"A journey that says go 说走就走的旅行"			Zhou Ziyan; Zhou Pin	3:26
7.	"Yeah"			Ma Jia	3:31

== Awards and nominations ==
Year	Award	Category	Nominee(s)	Result	Ref.
2019	Golden Bud – The Fourth Network Film And Television Festival	Best Actor	Ma Tianyu	Nominated	
2019	Golden Bud – The Fourth Network Film And Television Festival	Best Actress	Yang Zi	Nominated	
2019	Weibo TV Series Awards	Most Popular Actress	Yang Zi	Won	
