= Bodies at Rest =

2019 Chinese-Hong Kong film by Renny Harlin

- Film poster
- Traditional Chinese: 沉默的證人
- Simplified Chinese: 沉默的证人
- Directed by: Renny Harlin
- Screenplay by: Wu Mengzhang; Chang You
- Story by: David Lesser
- Produced by: Cary Cheng
- Starring: Nick Cheung; Richie Jen; Yang Zi
- Cinematography: Anthony Pun
- Edited by: Cheung Ka-fai
- Music by: Anthony Chue
- Production companies: Media Asia Films; Wanda Pictures
- Distributed by: Media Asia
- Release dates: March 18, 2019 (HKIFF); August 16, 2019 (China)
- Running time: 94 minutes
- Countries: China; Hong Kong
- Languages: Mandarin; Cantonese
- Box office: $25 million

Bodies at Rest is a 2019 action thriller film directed by Renny Harlin, starring Nick Cheung, Richie Jen and Yang Zi. It is Harlin's third Chinese-language film, following Skiptrace (2016) and Legend of the Ancient Sword (2018). The film had its world premiere as the opening film of the 43rd Hong Kong International Film Festival on March 18, 2019. It was released in China on August 16, 2019. The movie is considered a moderate commercial success.

== Plot ==
Pathologist Chen Jia Hao and his assistant Lynn Qiao are working late at a public morgue on Christmas Eve. Three masked men break into the morgue, trying to retrieve a bullet from the corpse of Ankie Cheng.

== Cast ==
- Nick Cheung as Nick Chan
- Yang Zi as Lynn Qiao
- Richie Jen as Santa
- Jiayi Feng as Rudolph
- Carlos Chan as Elf
- Shuliang Ma as Uncle King
- MC Jin as Wyatt
- Roger Kwok as Ah Jie
- Ron Ng as Officer Li
- Sonija Kwok as Mrs. Chan
- Ming Peng as Officer Wu
- Clara Lee as Ankie Cheng

== Release ==
The film had its world premiere as the opening film of the 43rd Hong Kong International Film Festival on March 18, 2019. It was also screened at the Far East Film Festival and the Edinburgh International Film Festival. It was released in China on August 16, 2019. The film earned $18 million in its opening weekend.

== Reception ==
On review aggregator website Rotten Tomatoes, the film holds an approval rating of 83% based on six reviews, with an average rating of 6.5/10.

Elizabeth Kerr of The Hollywood Reporter wrote, "Despite its flaws, Bodies grabs you quickly and never really lets go for the entirety of its lean, efficient 90 minutes." She described the film as "the simultaneously derivative and yet entirely amusing hodgepodge." Fionnuala Halligan of Screen International commented that the film "delivers what it promises and no more, but it fulfils its brief with eye-rolling relish."
