= Born to Be Alive (TV series) =

Chinese television series

- 生命树
- Genre: Environmental protection
- Written by: Xiao Yifan; Huang Kaiwen; Li Xue, Zhao Shuo; Liu Xiaoxi, Lei Zi; Wang Sanmao
- Directed by: Li Xue; Zhao Shuo
- Starring: Yang Zi; Hu Ge
- Country of origin: China
- Original language: Mandarin
- No. of seasons: 1
- No. of episodes: 40

Production
- Executive producer: Hou Hongliang
- Producer: Zhao Ziyu
- Production locations: Golmud, Qinghai; Hoh Xil, Qinghai
- Cinematography: Duan Chunyu
- Running time: 45 minutes
- Production companies: China Media Group; Daylight Entertainment

Original release
- Network: CCTV-8 iQiyi
- Release: 30 January – 19 February 2026

Born to Be Alive (Chinese: 生命树; pinyin: Shéng Ming Shu) is a 2026 Chinese television series directed by Li Xue and produced by Daylight Entertainment. Based on true events, the series is set in Qinghai–Tibet Plateau in the 1990s and stars Yang Zi, Hu Ge, Li Guangjie, Mei Ting and Zhang Zhehua. It premiered on CCTV-8 and iQiyi on 30 January and ended its run on 19 February 2026.

The series emerged as a major critical success and received widespread acclaim for the performances of the actors, musical numbers and cinematography. It went on to receive numerous accolades, including eight nominations at the 31st Shanghai Television Festival, winning Best Director (Li Xue) and Best Actress (Yang Zi), and seven nominations at the 33rd China TV Golden Eagle Awards.

== Plot ==
The series is set in a fictional Mazhi county of Qinghai province in 1996. The poor region heavily relied upon agriculture and animal husbandry. The deputy county head of Mazhi county Duo Jie (played by Hu Ge) established a mountain patrol team with the support of the county head Lin Peisheng (played by Li Guangjie) to alleviate poverty and help people improve their livelihood as the surrounding Bolamula plateau was rich in minerals and wildlife resources. But after witnessing illegal mining and rampant poaching of the Tibetan antelope, the mountain patrol team shifted their focus on environmental protection.

Bai Ju (played by Yang Zi), a policewoman who was transferred to the mountain patrol team, became in charge of logistics and escorting poachers. She is an orphan adopted by Zhang Qinqin (played by Mei Ting), a doctor who came to Tibet as part of a medical aid program. With her exceptional sharpshooting skill, Bai Ju quickly becomes a key member of the patrol team. After experiencing many dangerous situation together, she forms close friendship with the members of the team and falls in love with Shao Yunfei (played by Zhang Zhehua), a newspaper reporter who documents the anti-poaching operations of the patrol team. The team work together to establish a nature reserve. But before it is completed Duo Jie disappears and the mountain patrol team gets disbanded. Bai Ju leaves the plateau but returns after 10 years reuniting with the old friends and investigates the disappearance of Duo Jie.

== Cast ==
=== Main cast ===
- Yang Zi as Bai Ju

A young policewoman and a member of the mountain petrol team. After her parent's death, she was adopted by Zhang Qinqin. She is resolute, brave and quickly becomes a key member of the patrol team in the anti-poaching effort of Tibetan antelope. After the patrol team disbands, she leaves the plateau. But returns after 10 years to investigate the cause of Duo Jie's disappearance. She marries Shao Yunfei after falling in love with him.

- Hu Ge as Duo Jie

Deputy county head of Mazhi County and the founder and captain of the mountain patrol team. The team was founded to help improve local livelihood but later they focused on environmental protection. He led the patrol team in establishing a nature reserve but disappeared suddenly which led to the team's disbandment.

- Li Guangjie as Lin Peisheng

County head of Mazhi County and is dedicated to improve local livelihood. He supported Duo Jie's mountain patrol team initially. But after the team's focus shifted to ecological protection, he proposed to disband it.

- Mei Ting as Zhang Qinqin

A doctor sent to Tibet as part of a medical aid program. She is the adopted mother of Bai Ju.

- Zhang Zhehua as Shao Yunfei

A newspaper reporter. He documents the anti-poaching operations of the mountain patrol team. He marries Bai Ju after falling in love with her.

=== Supporting cast ===
- Yuan Hong as Meng Yaohui
- Yang Shuo as Li Yongqiang

Member of mountain patrol team.

- Zhou You as Bai Chun

A military officer. Adoptive older brother of Bai Ju. He is in love with Bai Ju.

- Jinpa as Zha Cuo

Member of mountain patrol team.

- Feng Bing as Han Xuechao

Member of mountain patrol team.

- Geng Dan as Sang Ba

Member of mountain patrol team.

- Su Xin as He Qingyuan

Member of mountain patrol team.

- Caiding Zhaxi as Dong Zhiba

Member of mountain patrol team.

- Gama Wenjia as Zhang Yang

Member of mountain patrol team.

- Xu Aojun as Xiao Liu

Member of mountain patrol team.

- Dunzhu Ciren as Jiu Mei

Member of mountain patrol team.

- Zhou Fang as Bai Shao

Zhang Qinqin's daughter. Adoptive sister of Bai Ju.

- Zhou Siyu as Bai Ji

Zhang Qinqin's son. Adoptive younger brother of Bai Ju.

- Gama Jiumei as Zha Xi
- Song Chuyan as Feng Keqing
- Sonam Wangmo as Cai Ren
- Liu Mintao as Zhao Zhijin
- Cai Jiaming as Xiao Zhang
- Yangchuk Tso as Wang Mu
- He Yuhong as Xiao Yan
- Jing Hao as Shi Long
- Wang Yuning as Zhao Yuji
- Xu Duoduo as Shao Zhuling

Bai Ju and Shao Yunfei's daughter.

- Chen Weidong as Xie Yang
- Wang Linghe as Mu Zhonghe
- Zhang Yuqi as Fan Xingpeng
- Zhu Mengyao as Xia Jie
- Luo Weichen as Zhang Yuan

== Production ==
Born to Be Alive is based on true events. The production team worked for eight years before the drama finally went on to making. The creative team began collecting materials in 2019 and started writing the script. The character Duo Jie is based on two real life hero of anti-poaching operation in Tibetan plateau Jiesang Sonam Dajie and Qika Zhaba Duojie. To ensure authenticity, the production team went to Hoh Xil many times to gather materials. They interviewed former patrol members, Sonam Dajie's relatives and friends. Dr Zhang Qinqin is based on Han Mei, a doctor at the People's Hospital of Golmud City, Haixi Mongol and Tibetan Autonomous Prefecture, Qinghai Province.

=== Filming ===
The series officially began filming on 3 May 2025 in Delingha, Qinghai. They later filmed in Golmud and Hoh Xil. After 188 days, the series finished filming on 31 October 2025.

== Reception ==
Born to Be Alive achieved high ratings and critical acclaim since its premiere. By the end of its broadcast, it achieved an average rating of 1.37% and a market share of 7.02%, reaching 1.07 billion cumulative audience. Its total viewership reached 182 million, ranking first among evening dramas on satellite channels nationwide. It received a 8.4 rating on Douban. It has been broadcast on several other satellite channels.

=== Ratings ===
CCTV-8 CVB ratings
| | Ratings (%) | Audience Share (%) | Notes |
|---|---|---|---|
| Average | 1.37 | 7.02 | |

=== Impact ===
The popularity of Born to Be Alive boosted the tourism in Qinghai. During the spring festival holiday, the filming locations of the series Delingha and Golmud attracted lots of visitors. Offline public welfare activities were initiated, encouraging people to donate. The main leads of the series Yang Zi and Hu Ge were appointed as "Qinghai Ecological and Cultural Ambassadors". The Ministry of Ecology and Environment also appointed Yang Zi as the Special Observer for Ecological and Environmental Protection.

The vice-governor of Qinghai Liu Tao wrote a letter to the cast and crew of the series thanking them. A symposium on Born to Be Alive was held by the National Radio and Television Administration in Beijing with the Ministry of Public Security participating. The National Natural History Museum of China displayed an exhibition co-created by the series and the museum.

== Soundtracks ==
| No. | Title | Lyrics | Music | Singer | Length |
|---|---|---|---|---|---|
| 1. | "Tree of Life (生命树)" (Theme song) | Li Jiqing | Duan Lian | Tan Weiwei |
| 2. | "Snow Lotus in my Heart (心中的雪莲)" | | | Yangge Zhuoma & De Geye |
| 3. | "Drinking Song (酒歌)" (Folk song) | | | Yangge Zhuoma & Gongbu Angjie |
| 4. | "If We Had Never Met (如果不曾相见)" | | | Rèxī Cái Ràngdàn |
| 5. | "Young Friends (年轻的朋友)" (Folk song) | | | Ze Me |

== Accolades ==
| Year | Award | Category | Nominee(s) | Result | Ref. |
|---|---|---|---|---|---|
| 2026 | Film and TV Role Model 2025 Annual Ranking | Most Anticipated Television series of the Year | Born to Be Alive | Won | |
| 2026 | Global OTT Awards | Best Work | Born to Be Alive | Nominated | |
| 2026 | Global OTT Awards | Best Director | Li Xue | Won | |
| 2026 | Capital Audiovisual Program Spring Fair Audiovisual Glory Night | Television Series of the Year | Born to Be Alive | Won | |
| 2026 | 31st Shanghai Television Festival | Best Television Series | Born to Be Alive | Nominated | |
| 2026 | 31st Shanghai Television Festival | Best Director | Li Xue | Won | |
| 2026 | 31st Shanghai Television Festival | Best Actress | Yang Zi | Won | |
| 2026 | 31st Shanghai Television Festival | Best Actor | Hu Ge | Nominated | |
| 2026 | 31st Shanghai Television Festival | Best Supporting Actress | Mei Ting | Nominated | |
| 2026 | 31st Shanghai Television Festival | Best Original Screenplay | Xiao Yifan, Huang Kaiwen, Li Xue, Zhao Shuo, Liu Xiaoxi, Wang Sanmao, Lei Zi | Nominated | |
| 2026 | 31st Shanghai Television Festival | Best Cinematography | Duan Chunyu | Nominated | |
| 2026 | 31st Shanghai Television Festival | Best Art Direction | Wang Jing | Nominated | |
| 2026 | China Film & Television Night | Recommended TV Series Music of the Year | Born to Be Alive | Won | |
| 2026 | China Film & Television Night | Recommended Director of the Year | Li Xue, Zhao Shuo | Won | |
| 2026 | 33rd China TV Golden Eagle Awards | Best TV Series | Born to Be Alive | Won | |
| 2026 | 33rd China TV Golden Eagle Awards | Best Actor | Hu Ge | Nominated | |
| 2026 | 33rd China TV Golden Eagle Awards | Best Actress | Yang Zi | Nominated | |
| 2026 | 33rd China TV Golden Eagle Awards | Best Supporting Actor | Li Guangjie | Nominated | |
| 2026 | 33rd China TV Golden Eagle Awards | Best Supporting Actress | Mei Ting | Won | |
| 2026 | 33rd China TV Golden Eagle Awards | Best Director | Li Xue | Nominated | |
| 2026 | 33rd China TV Golden Eagle Awards | Best Screenwriter | Xiao Yifan, Huang Kaiwen, Li Xue, Zhao Shuo, Liu Xiaoxi, Wang Sanmao, Lei Zi | Won | |
| 2026 | Golden Eagle TV Producer Annual Influence Ceremony | Most Influential Producer | Zhao Ziyu | Won | |
| 2026 | 9th True Aspiration Award | Outstanding Drama of the Year | Born to Be Alive | Won | |
| 2026 | 9th True Aspiration Award | Outstanding Young Director of the Year | Zhao Shuo | Nominated | |
| 2026 | 9th True Aspiration Award | Outstanding Young Screenwriter of the Year | Xiao Yifan | Nominated | |
| 2026 | 9th True Aspiration Award | Outstanding Young Creative Producer of the Year | Zhao Ziyu | Won | |
| 2026 | 9th True Aspiration Award | Outstanding Producer of the Year (Platform) | Shao Dongxu (iQiyi) | Won | |
| 2026 | China Film Art Direction Academy Annual Award | Art Direction of the Year | Born to Be Alive | Nominated | |
| 2026 | China Film Art Direction Academy Annual Award | Costume Design of the Year | Born to Be Alive | Nominated | |
| 2026 | Weibo TV & Internet Video Summit | Influential Work of the Year | Born to Be Alive | Won | |
| 2026 | 22nd Chinese American Television Festival | Top 10 TV Series | Born to Be Alive | Won | |
| 2026 | 22nd Chinese American Television Festival | Best Actress in a Leading Role | Yang Zi | Won | |
