= Beijing No. 55 High School =

- 北京第五十五中学
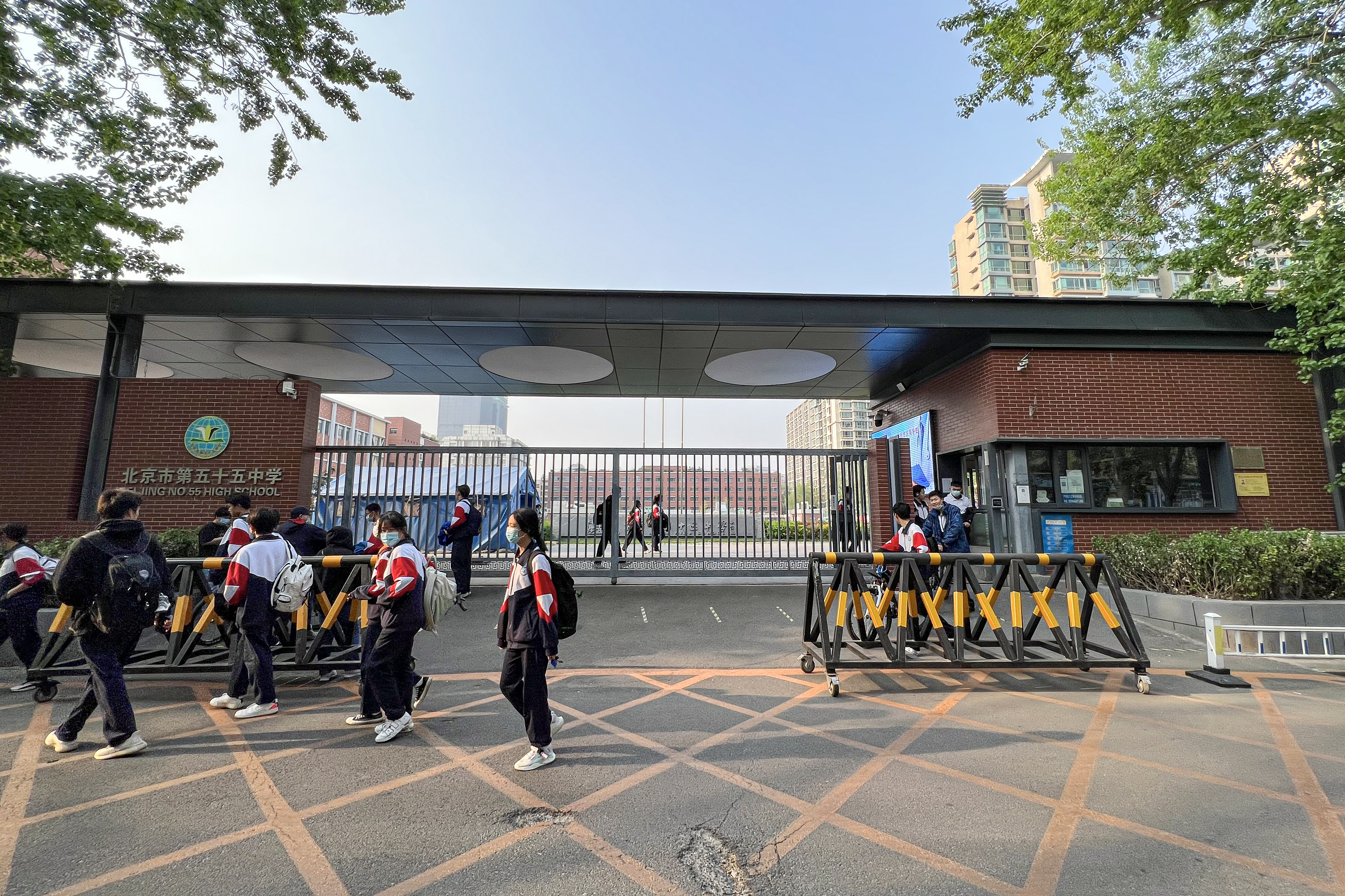
- Dongcheng District, Beijing; People's Republic of China

Information
- School type: Public school
- Motto: Seeking truth, innovation, self-improvement, peace, progress and lifelong friendship.
- Established: 1975
- Status: Active
- School district: Dongcheng District
- Principal: Chen Hong
- Party Secretary: Wang Huibo
- Campus type: Urban

Beijing No. 55 High School (北京第五十五中学) is a public secondary school Dongcheng, Beijing, China. The school is managed by the Beijing City Dongcheng District Education Committee.
