= Ashes of Love (TV series) =

Chinese television series

- Drama poster
- Also known as: Heavy Sweetness, Ash-like Frost

Chinese name
- Traditional Chinese: 香蜜沉沉燼如霜
- Simplified Chinese: 香蜜沉沉烬如霜
Transcriptions
- Genre: Xianxia; Fantasy; Romance
- Based on: Heavy Sweetness, Ash-like Frost by Dian Xian
- Written by: Ma Jia; Xu Zishan; Liu Gelin; Chen Lusha; Zhang Yuan'ang
- Directed by: Zhu Ruibin
- Starring: Yang Zi; Deng Lun; Luo Yunxi; Wang Yifei; Chen Yuqi; Zou Tingwei
- Composer: Sa Dingding
- Country of origin: China
- Original language: Mandarin
- No. of seasons: 1
- No. of episodes: 63 (TV), 60 (DVD)

Production
- Executive producers: Liu Ning; Zhang Yancheng
- Production location: Hengdian World Studios
- Running time: 45 mins
- Production companies: Perfect World Pictures; Omnijoi Media Corporation; Happy Era Media; Kunchi Pictures; Chongqing Shengmei

Original release
- Network: Jiangsu TV
- Release: August 2 – September 4, 2018

Ashes of Love (Chinese: 香蜜沉沉烬如霜; pinyin: Xiāng Mì Chén Chén Jìn Rú Shuāng) is a 2018 Chinese television series based on the novel Heavy Sweetness, Ash-like Frost (2009) by Dian Xian. It stars Yang Zi as Jin Mi and Deng Lun as Xu Feng in the lead roles. The series premiered on Jiangsu TV on August 2, 2018 and was available to watch on Netflix until December 2023.

The series reached 100 million views in just 15 minutes after the broadcast of the first episode. As of January 2019, the series has reached over 15 billion views.

== Synopsis ==
Jin Mi (Yang Zi) is a carefree grape sprite of the Flower Realm whose true identity is that of the daughter of the former Flower Immortal, Zifen (Zhang Yanyan), and the Water Immortal, Luo Lin (Wang Renjun). Born as her mother was dying, Zifen foresaw a love tragedy would effect Jin Mi in the first ten thousand years of her life and so gave Jin Mi an elixir to make her unable to love. Zifen orders that her daughter be raised in secret and allowed to live a carefree life, and then she passes away. Jin Mi once attempted to run away from the water mirror along with her friend Rourou(Furou Meiqi) who died protecting Jin Mi and has since been turned into a succulent plant. Saved from the beast Qiongqi (Hu Mianyang) by Lord Puchi (Liao Jingfeng), Jin Mi is told that a high immortal of the Heavenly Realm might be able to revive her friend Rourou.

Fire Immortal Xufeng (Deng Lun) is the son of the Heavenly Emperor Taiwei (He Zhonghua) and Heavenly Empress Tuyao (Kathy Chow). Widely regarded as a God of War, Xufeng harbors no real ambition of replacing his father as Emperor despite his mother's insistence and has no desire to compete with his older brother Run Yu (Luo Yunxi), or to secure his position as Crown Prince by marrying Princess Sui He (Wang Yi Fei) of the Bird Tribe whom he views as a sister. He accidentally disturbs Jin Mi's isolation when he is attacked during his Nirvana that Phoenixes must undertake, and crashes through the Flower Realm's water mirror. Jin Mi helps to restore Xufeng to life by feeding him an elixir which she had cultivated for hundreds of years and as repayment requests that the Xufeng take her to the Heavenly Realm in the hopes of restoring her friend.

The truth of her parentage is ultimately revealed after the Emperor mistakes Jin Mi for his daughter with Zifen, making Jin Mi the target of the grudges of Sui Hei, who loves Xufeng, and Tuyao, who killed Zifen out of jealousy. When it is revealed that Jin Mi is actually the Water Immortal's daughter, an ancient marriage contract to Run Yu is poised to stand in the way of Xufeng and Jin Mi's love which developed after the two experienced a tragic romance together while experiencing hardships in the mortal realm. After his mother is killed by the Heavenly Empress, Run Yu plots to seize control of the Heavenly Realm, and pushes for his marriage with Jin Mi which he uses as an opportunity to launch a coup. Xufeng is killed by Jin Mi at her wedding when she is manipulated into believing Xufeng killed her father, and returns as the Demon King to oppose his brother Run Yu, who has seized the position of Heavenly Emperor. Tragedy befalls Jin Mi as the elixir preventing her from feeling love is destroyed after she kills Xufeng and she realizes that she was in love with Xufeng after all and she becomes caught between the warring siblings.

== Cast ==
=== Main ===
- Yang Zi as Jin Mi (锦觅)
  - A grape spirit, whose real identity is a six-petal frost flower fairy. Daughter of the Flower Deity and Water Deity. She is naive and altruistic but does not understand the true meaning of love due to the magical pill she was given at birth. She later becomes the Water Deity following her father's death.
- Deng Lun as Xu Feng (旭凤)
  - Second prince of the Heavenly Realm and the legitimate heir of the Heavenly Throne, the Fire Deity, God of War, and the Commander of the Divine Armies of 8 Directions. He becomes King Yi of Huai Wu Kingdom, a warrior king in the Mortal Realm in his mortal trial. His true form is that of a phoenix. He becomes the Demon King after his rebirth in the Demon Realm.
- Luo Yunxi as Run Yu (润玉)
  - Eldest prince of the Heavenly Realm; the Night Deity. A gentle and calm person, he never makes a move without being certain of the outcome. After his mother's death, he becomes coldhearted and ambitious to the point where he usurps the throne. His true form is that of a dragon.
- Wang Yi Fei as Sui He (穗禾)
  - Princess of the Bird Tribe; proud and arrogant, she wields great responsibility in securing power within the Bird tribe. A close ally & niece of the Heavenly Empress, she goes on to commit many cruel deeds in her attempt to obtain power and marry Xu Feng. Her true form is that of a peacock.
- Chen Yuqi as Liu Ying (鎏英)
  - Demon Princess. A cheerful and forthright girl, and a heroic warrior. She has a tragic romantic relationship with her bodyguard, Mu Ci.
- Zou Tingwei as Qi Yuan (奇鸢), Mu Ci (暮辭)
  - A reaper who has double identities. He was forced to commit evil deeds for the Heavenly Empress due to her control and manipulation of him, but he remains kind at heart. He was Liu Ying's bodyguard before he was thrown out of the demon realm, because of his tribe and ability to create an arrow using his blood & bones which can kill any deity. He has a tragic romantic relationship with Liu Ying.

=== Supporting ===
==== Heaven realm ====
- He Zhonghua as Taiwei (太微)
  - Heavenly Emperor. Ruler of the Heaven realm. At first good-hearted later cruel, he is adept at making use of other people to achieve his goals. His true form is that of a golden dragon.
- Kathy Chow as Tuyao (荼姚)
  - Heavenly Empress. Ruler of the Bird Tribe. A scheming and cruel woman who caused the death of the Flower Deity, along with many others. She schemes to get rid of any threats to Xufeng's ascension to Heavenly Emperor, including Jinmi and Runyu.
- Xia Zhiyuan as Dan Zhu (丹朱), Match Maker, Moon Immortal (月下仙人), Fox Immortal (狐狸仙)
  - The Moon Immortal Yuexia. His true form is that of a fox. Taiwei's younger brother; Xufeng and Runyu's uncle. Known for his mischievous personality and youthful looks, he is in charge of love and marriage of all mortal beings. He is earnest in bringing Xufeng and Jin Mi together as a couple.
- Wang Renjun as Luo lin (洛霖)
  - Water Deity. Jin Mi's father and Zifen's former lover. An elegant and refined man who keeps himself out of worldly affairs, but is loyal and helpful to those in need.
- Wang Yuanke as Lin Xiu (临秀)
  - Wind Immortal. Luo lin's betrothed wife. A kind and gentle woman who was a good friend of Zifen and, later, treats Jin Mi as her own.
- Fan Mianlin as Suli (簌离)
  - Dragon Fish Princess. Lord of Dongting lake. Runyu's birth mother, who gave birth to him after being seduced by the Heavenly Emperor, which was due to her resemblance to Zifen. She schemed for years to seek revenge on the Heavenly Empress for killing her tribe.
- Liao Jingfeng as Lord Puchi (扑哧君), Yanyou (彦佑)
  - Snake Immortal. After getting banished from the Heaven realm, he was adopted by Suli and became one of her god-sons. He goes along with his adoptive mother's schemes. He befriended Jinmi after saving her from the attack of Qiongqi nine hundred years ago.
- Du Yuchen as Kuang Lu (邝露)
  - Daughter of Immortal Taiji. She voluntarily becomes Runyu's subordinate due to her admiration for him, and remains loyal to him from then on.
- Sa Dingding as Immortal Yuanji (缘机仙子)
  - An immortal who is in charge of the fate and destiny of human beings. She has a friendship with Moon Immortal.
- Zhang Junran as Lord Liaoyuan (燎原君), Qin Tong (秦潼)
  - Xufeng's personal guard.
- Li Yixuan as Lord Doumu (斗姆元君)
  - Luolin, Lin Xiu and Zifen's teacher.
- Li Yongtian as Taishang Laojun (太上老君)
- Zhang Shihong as Immortal Taiji (太巳仙人)
- He Junlin as Thunder God Yunxiang (云响雷公)
- Liu Siying as Lightning Goddess, Shengguang (圣光电母)
- Li Xuefeng as Rat Immortal (鼠仙)
  - Leader of the Zodiac Immortals. Suli's subordinate, who helps her collect information in the Heaven realm.
- Zhang Xiaoyang as Liao Ting (了听)
  - Xufeng's subordinate.
- Cui Binbin as Fei Xu (飞絮)
  - Xufeng's subordinate.
- Zheng Ge as Po Jun (破军)
  - A heavenly soldier recruited by Xufeng.
- Fu Hongsheng as Yinque (隐雀)
  - Elder of Bird Tribe.
- Dong Xiaobai as Queling (雀灵)
  - Suihe's subordinate.
- Liu Haochen as Lianchao (廉晁)
  - Brother of Taiwei, and Tuyao's first love.
- Liu Xiangping as Earth Deity (土地仙)
- Zhong Sutong as Little Fairy (小仙女)

==== Flower realm ====
- Zhang Yanyan as Zifen (梓芬)
  - Flower Deity. Ruler of the Flower Realm. Jinmi's mother. She died in childbirth after being attacked by the Heavenly Empress.
- Peng Yang as Chief Peony (牡丹芳主)
  - Head of the Pavilion chiefs.
- Ma Jing as Chief Begonia (海棠芳主)
- Wen Luhan as Chief Magnolia (玉兰芳主)
- Furou Meiqi as Rourou (肉肉), Qianghuo (羌活)
  - A succulent plant sprite. Jinmi's close friend, who died saving Jinmi from Qiongqi's attacks. She is later revived to accompany Jin Mi in her mortal trial.
- Ning Wentong as Lao Hu (老胡)
  - Carrot sprite. An elder of the Flower Realm.
- Xia Yiyao as Lianqiao (廉晁)
  - A flower sprite.
- Wu Wenxuan as Pavilion Chief (芳主)
- Duan Yu as Pavilion Chief (芳主)

==== Demon realm ====
- Lu Yong as King Yancheng (焱城王)
  - Ruler of the Demon realm.
- Yao Qingren as King Biancheng (卞城王)
  - Liuying's father.
- Song Yunhao as King Gucheng (固城王)
  - An ambitious man who aims to usurp the throne.
- Wang Siyu as Chishou (炽狩)
  - Son of King Yancheng.
- Li Silang as Xuanshou (炫狩)
  - Son of King Yancheng.
- Hu Mianyang as Qiongqi (穷奇)
  - A ferocious and legendary beast.

==== Mortal realm ====
- Sun Ning as Lord Nanping (南平侯)
  - A royal of Huaiwu Kingdom and Suihe's father in the human realm. He aims to kill Xufeng during his mortal trial and usurp the throne.
- Zhou Yihua as Chancellor Fu (傅相)
  - Chancellor of the Huaiwu Kingdom.
- Tuo Gufeng as General Ji Chong (偏将齐冲)
  - Lord Nanping's subordinate.
- Wen Jing as Jingjie (荆芥)
  - Elder of the Healer Tribe. She adopted Jinmi as a child during her mortal trial.

== Production ==
The series began filming in June 2017 and finished in October 2017.

== Soundtrack ==
Ashes of Love Original Soundtrack (香蜜沉沉烬如霜 电视原声音乐专辑)
No.	Title	Lyrics	Music	Singers	Length
1.	"Unsullied (不染)" (Opening theme song)	Hai Lei	Jason Hong	Mao Buyi (version 1); Sa Dingding (version 2); Jian Hongyi (version 3)	5:25
2.	"Upwards to the Moon (左手指月)" (Ending theme song)	Yu Hong	Sa Dingding	Sa Dingding	3:50
3.	"Unparalleled in the World (天地无霜)"	Yu Hong	Sa Dingding	Yang Zi & Deng Lun (duet version); Deng Lun (solo version)	3:36
4.	"Love Frost (情霜)"	Yu Hong	Sa Dingding	Yang Zi	4:22

== Reception ==
This drama was commercially successful, placing first among audience ratings in its time slot and reaching over ten billion views. It also received positive reviews, scoring a 7.7 on Douban. The drama was praised for its light-hearted yet grounded storyline, high production quality of beautiful cinematography and exquisite costumes; as well as the tight pacing of the plot and excellent performance of the actors.

=== Ratings ===
Episode	Original air date	CSM52 City		Rank	National Average		Rank
Episode	Original air date	Ratings	Audience share	Rank	Ratings	Audience share	Rank
1–2	August 2, 2018	0.995	3.722	3	0.5	2.05	7
3–4	August 3, 2018	1.139	4.344	3	0.63	2.52	5
5	August 4, 2018	1.172	4.74	1	0.58	2.61	4
6-7	August 5, 2018	1.241	4.621	1	0.67	2.67	3
8–9	August 6, 2018	1.384	5.203	1	0.78	3.12	5
10–11	August 7, 2018	1.368	5.185	1	0.75	3.01	5
12-13	August 8, 2018	1.503	5.735	1	0.88	3.49	5
14–15	August 9, 2018	1.44	5.455	1	0.83	3.38	4
16–17	August 10, 2018	1.328	5.066	2	0.86	3.47	3
18	August 11, 2018	1.249	4.912	1	0.82	3.55	4
19-20	August 12, 2018	1.272	4.636	1	0.84	3.29	3
21-22	August 13, 2018	1.417	5.254	2	1.03	4.05	4
23-24	August 14, 2018	1.374	5.047	2	0.94	3.74	3
25-26	August 15, 2016	1.349	5.102	2	0.99	4.02	3
27-28	August 16, 2018	1.253	4.662	2	1.04	3.96	3
29-30	August 17, 2018	1.148	4.415	2	0.98	3.81	2
31	August 18, 2018	1.181	4.667	1	0.99	4.07	2
32-33	August 19, 2018	1.176	4.205	1	0.99	3.85	1
34-35	August 20, 2018	1.352	4.912	1	1.17	4.49	1
36-37	August 21, 2018	1.353	5.029	1	0.99	3.76	2
38-39	August 22, 2018	1.508	5.384	1	1.15	4.32	3
40-41	August 23, 2018	1.273	4.728	2	1.15	4.45	3
42-43	August 24, 2018	1.168	4.301	2	1.08	4.13	3
44	August 25, 2018	1.051	3.871	1	0.89	3.62	2
45-46	August 26, 2018	1.321	4.798	1	1.13	4.2	2
47-48	August 27, 2018	1.396	5.003	1	1.18	4.43	2
49-50	August 28, 2018	1.393	5.064	1	1.19	4.38	2
51-52	August 29, 2018	1.294	4.711	2	1.3	4.85	2
53-54	August 30, 2018	1.283	4.612	2	1.39	5.09	1
55-56	August 31, 2018	1.277	4.545	1	1.54	5.55	1
57	September 1, 2018	1.315	4.414	1	1.58	5.22	1
58-59	September 2, 2018	1.378	4.954	1	1.51	5.58	1
60-61	September 3, 2018	1.358	5.073	1	1.64	6.46	1
62-63	September 4, 2018	1.322	5.093	1	1.64	6.36	1
Average	—N/a	1.301	4.82	—N/a			—N/a

- Highest ratings are marked in red, lowest ratings are marked in blue

=== Awards and nominations ===
Awards	Category	Nominated work	Result	Ref.
24th Huading Awards	Best Actor (Ancient Drama)	Deng Lun	Nominated	
24th Huading Awards	Best Actress (Ancient Drama)	Yang Zi	Nominated	
7th iQiyi All-Star Carnival	Popularity Award (Actor)	Deng Lun	Won	
12th Tencent Video Star Awards	Popular TV Actor	Deng Lun	Won	
12th Tencent Video Star Awards	Popular TV Actress of the Year	Yang Zi	Won	
12th Tencent Video Star Awards	Top Ten Series	Ashes of Love	Won	
Entertainment Capital The 2nd Golden Pebble Award	Best Episode Project	Ashes of Love	Won	
Media Internal Reference - TV Guide 2018 Mobile Influence Summit Forum	The Most Influential Drama Trader of the 2018 Fingertips List	Liu Ning	Won	
Media Internal Reference - TV Guide 2018 Mobile Influence Summit Forum	The Most Mobile TV Drama of the 2018 Fingertips List	Ashes of Love	Won	
Weibo Taiwanese TV series	Weibo 2018 Influence Drama	Ashes of Love	Won	
V Influence Summit 2018	2018 Most Best Drama Producer	Liu Ning	Won	
TV Drama Award 2018 (Weibo TV Series)	Top 10 Most Popular Drama	Ashes of Love	Top 3	
TV Drama Award 2018 (Weibo TV Series)	Top 10 Most Popular Actor	Deng Lun	Top 3	
TV Drama Award 2018 (Weibo TV Series)	Top 10 Most Popular Actor	Yang Zi	Top 5	
TV Drama Award 2018 (Weibo TV Series)	Most Popular Screen Couple	Yang Zi and Deng Lun	Won	
TV Drama Award 2018 (Weibo TV Series)	The Most Popular Hot Stalk	""Have you ever loved me..." "Never"	Won	
TV Drama Award 2018 (Weibo TV Series)	The Most Popular Hot Stalk	"You are finally my ugly wife."	Top 5	
Weibo Award Ceremony	Weibo Annual Hot Drama Honor	Ashes of Love	Won	
Weibo Award Ceremony	Weibo Popular Artist	Deng Lun	Won	
Weibo Award Ceremony	Weibo Goddess	Yang Zi	Won	
Tencent Entertainment White Paper	Popular Television Actress of the Year	Yang Zi	Won	
Film and TV Role Model 2018 Annual General Rating	Popular Actress	Yang Zi	Won	
Film and TV Role Model 2018 Annual General Rating	Annual Drama Producer	Liu Ning	Won	
Film and TV Role Model 2018 Annual General Rating	Annual Drama Director	Zhu Ruibin	Won	
Film and TV Role Model 2018 Annual General Rating	Annual Drama Series Screenwriter	Ma Jia	Won	
Influence of Recreational Responsibilities Awards	TV Drama of the Year	Ashes of Love	Won	
The Third Internet Film Festival	Most Capable Actress	Kathy Chow	Won	
Seoul International Drama Awards	Most Popular Foreign Drama of the Year	Ashes of Love	Won	
2020 TVING Awards	Most Popular Overseas Drama	Ashes of Love	Won	
