= Wu Muye =

Chinese pianist

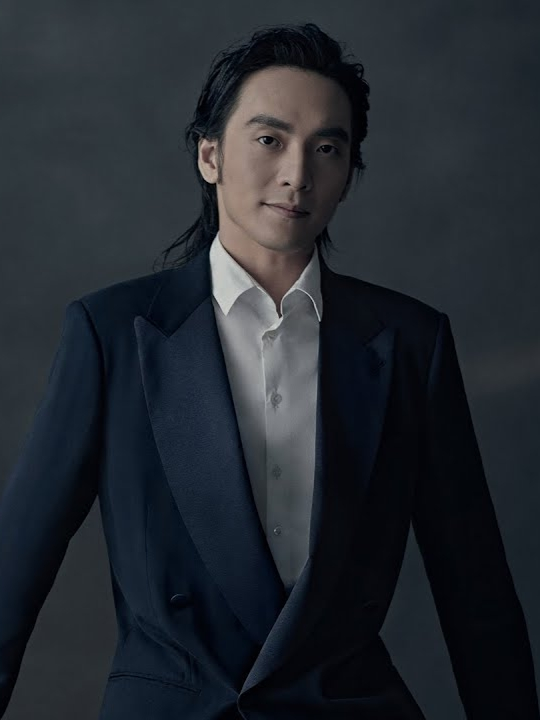
- Wu in 2022
- Born: December 23, 1985 (age 40); Beijing, China
- Other names: Muye Wu, Mu-Ye Wu, 吴牧野 (Chinese)
- Citizenship: Chinese
- Education: National Conservatory of Music Beijing and Conservatoire National Supérieur de Musique et de Danse Paris
- Occupations: pianist; composer
- Years active: 1994–present
- Political party: RCCK
- Website: muyewu.com

Wu Muye (Chinese: 吴牧野; pinyin: Wú Mùyě; born 23 December 1985) is a Chinese pianist.

== Early life and education ==
Wu Muye was born on 23 December 1985 in Beijing, and grew up in Hainan. He started taking piano and violin lessons at the age of 4. At 5, he gave his first public performance, and he won his first contest, the Hong Kong Children's Piano Competition, at the age of 9. In 1996 he was admitted to the fifth grade of the National Conservatory of Music in Beijing. After graduating in 1999, he moved to Paris to study at the Conservatoire National Supérieur de Musique et de Danse, having Jacques Rouvier as his mentor. After completing the undergraduate program he continued studying at the Conservatoire, despite already having an international career, and graduated in 2009 with a PhD in music.

In 2009, he also became the first Chinese pianist to ever receive the Perfect Piano Performing Artist Medal by the French Ministry of Culture.

== Career ==
Wu Muye has won several awards and is laureate of many international piano competitions including 3rd Prize at the 2003 Ferruccio Busoni International Piano Competition in Bolzano, Italy, the Grand-Prix at the 2004 Marguerite-Long-Jacques-Thibaud Competition in Paris, France, and the gold medal at the 2005 Piano Campus International Piano Competition in Pointoise, France.

He has performed at many prestigious events such as the Expo Shanghai 2010, the 60th Anniversary Gala of UNESCO, at the 50th Anniversary Ceremony for the establishment of diplomatic relations between China and France and at the APEC state banquet hosted for the US president Barack Obama in 2014; at the Milan Expo 2015; at the Opening Ceremony of the 2016 G20 Summit; at the World Health Organization Meeting dedictated to the 30rd World AIDS Day at the WHO headquarters and at the BRICS Leaders Meeting in 2017; and at the CCTV Spring Festival Gala in 2018.

He had two soloist world tours, the Wu Muye "Complete Works of Schubert impromptus" Piano Recital Tour from 2018 to 2019, and in December 2019 his Wu Muye "Complete Works of Chopin Waltzes" Piano Recital World Tour started.

In December 2018, he opened a piano studio, the Wu Muye Studio, in Hangzhou, that gives non-profit piano lessons to children and teenagers.

== Filmography ==
Documentaries about Wu Muye
Year	TV channel	Original title	English title	Chinese title	Language
2020	Dragon TV	Chapitre du Temps	The Movement of Time	时间的乐章 (Shíjiān de yuèzhāng)	Mandarin and French

== Awards ==
Year	Award	Country	Category
2009	Medal by the French Ministry of Culture	France (national medal)	Perfect Piano Performing Artist Medal
2012	National Academy of Arts	China (national award)	Outstanding Performance Award
2016	2016 G20 Summit Hangzhou Opening Ceremony	China (international award)	Outstanding Contribution Award
2017	Honor by the World Health Organization	China (international title)	WHO China Special Envoy for Health Title
2018	Honorary Title by the Sanya Government	China (national title)	Honorary Sanya International Cultural Exchange Ambassador Title
2018	L'Officiel Awards	China (national award)	Influence of the Times Award
2018	2018 Ifeng Fashion Choice Gala	China (national award)	Most Influential International Artist Award
2019	Title by the Hainan Provincial Government	China (national title)	Honorary International Ambassador for Hainan Tourism and Culture Title
2019	Youth Power· Next Generation Influencers for Global Philanthropy Gala	China (international gala)	Artist of China for Global Philanthropy Honor
2019	Honorary title by UNESCO and the World Health Organization	China (international honor)	Honorary Tobacco Control Health Ambassador Title for promoting a smoke-free lifestyle
