= Tianjin Television And Radio Station =

Chinese state broadcaster

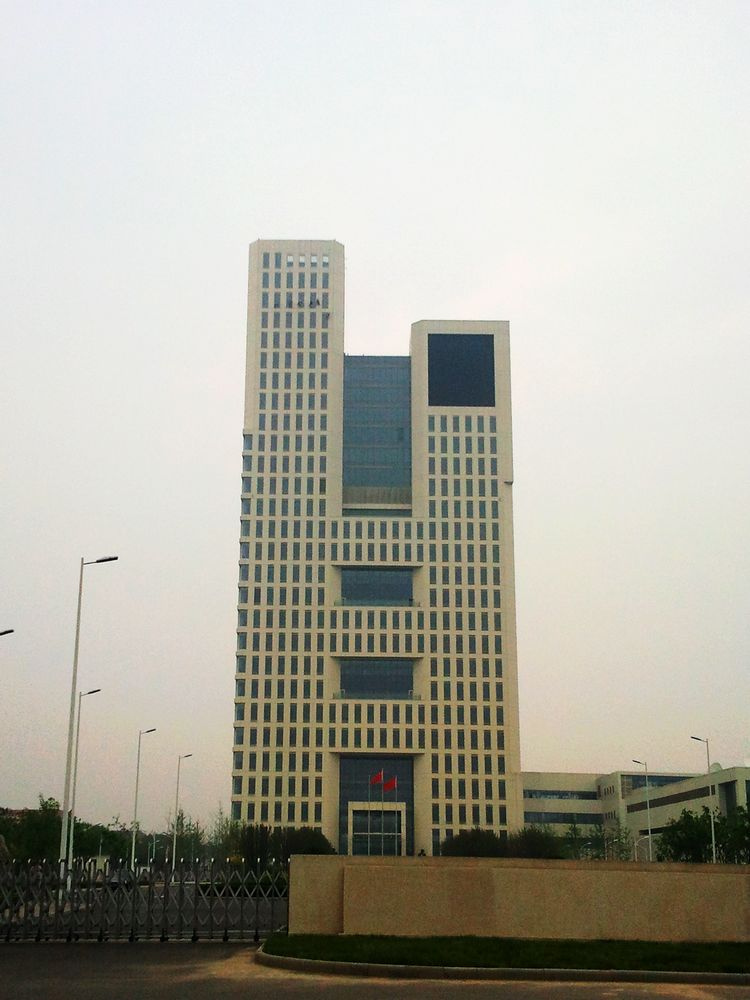
Tianjin Television And Radio Station

Tianjin Renmin Guangbo Diantai (Chinese: 天津人民广播电台; pinyin: Tiānjīn Rénmín Guǎngbō Diàntái), translated as the Tianjin People's Broadcasting Station (TPBS) is a major radio broadcaster in Tianjin, China. They also operate the Tianjin Television station, also known as TJTV. Tianjin Television (TJTV) (Chinese: 天津电视台; pinyin: Tiānjīn Diànshìtái) is a television network in the city of Tianjin, China. Its official website is called Tianshi Wang (天视网). Popular TV programs on TJTV include "Foreigners in China" (泊客中国), "This Week" (这一周), "Xiaomi Helping You" (小秘帮帮), and "Carnival" (津夜嘉年华). Tianjin Renmin Guangbo Diantai and Tianjin Television together forms Tianjin Television and Radio Station.

== List of Tianjin Radio Stations ==
Tianjin Renmin Guangbo Diantai
- Tianjin; China
- Broadcast area: Tianjin, Hebei, Beijing
- Frequency: (see below)
- Branding: Tianjin Renmin Guangbo Diantai

Programming
- Format: various formats

Ownership
- Owner: Tianjin Renmin Guangbo Diantai

History
- Call sign meaning: "TJ" stands for Tianjin

Links
- Website: http://www.radiotj.com

Tianjin Radio Stations
Frequency (FM)	Frequency (AM)	Name
87.8 FM	747 AM	Tianjin Binhai Radio (天津滨海广播)
91.1 FM	1386 AM	Tianjin Life Radio (天津生活广播)
97.2 FM	909 AM	Tianjin News Radio (天津新闻广播)
99.0 FM		Nice Radio (天津音乐广播)
101.4 FM		Tianjin Economical Radio (天津经济广播)
104.6 FM	1008 AM	Tianjin Literature Radio (天津文艺广播)
106.8 FM		Tianjin Traffic Radio (天津交通广播)
87.8 FM		Entertainment
666 AM		Novel Radio

== List of TJTV channels ==
Tianjin Television (TJTV) 天津电视台
- Logo of Tianjin Television
- Type: Broadcast
- Country: China
- Official website: TJTV Online

- Tianjin Satellite Channel (天津卫视)
- Tianjin News Channel (天津新闻)
- Tianjin Art Channel (天津文艺)
- Tianjin Drama Channel (天津影视)
- Tianjin City Channel (天津都市)
- Tianjin Sports Channel (天津体育)
- Tianjin Science and Education Channel (天津科教)
- Tianjin Children's Channel (天津少儿)
- Sanjia Shopping Channel (三佳购物)

=== Former TJTV channels ===
- Tianjin Public Channel (天津公共) - Stopped airing on January 1, 2020
- Tianjin International Channel (天津国际) - Stopped airing on June 27, 2018
