= Bi Shumin =

Chinese writer

Bi Shumin (Chinese: 毕淑敏; born 1952 in Xinjiang) is a Chinese novelist, self-help writer and psychiatrist.

== Biography ==
Born in Yili to a Shandong family, she grew up in Beijing and as a young woman served as nurse and psychiatrist in Tibet. Her first published work was a novella, "Kunlun Shang" ("昆仑殇; Death in Kunlun"), based on her experience as a People's Liberation Army medic. She is noted for her women-focused narratives, often surrounding women in the Chinese military on the Tibetan plateau in her earlier work and on urban medical professionals in more recent work. She is also a well-known media presence, based according to one academic analysis on the "charismatic authority claim" that she lives a "balanced and happy life."

Her 2003 novel Save the Breast (拯救乳房) "relates an experimentation of talk therapy with a group of patients to deal with the biopolitics of breast cancer as both social stigma and physio-psychic trauma against the tide of medical marketing in today's China." Her 2012 novel Coronavirus (花冠病毒) drew attention during the COVID-19 pandemic. The title and "much of the novel's source material came from Bi Shumin's own observations during the anti-SARS (Severe Acute Respiratory Syndrome) battle of 2003 in China."

Several examples of both fiction and essays have been translated into English, and her work has attracted critical attention especially from those interested in gender in contemporary Chinese literature and the depiction of medicine and illness. Prizes she has won include the Chen Bochui Children's Literature Award.
