= Liu Chang (actor) =

Chinese actor and singer

- Born: April 15, 1993 (age 33); Tianshui, Gansu, China
- Education: Communication University of China
- Occupations: Actor, singer
- Years active: 2018–present

Chinese name
- Traditional Chinese: 劉暢
- Simplified Chinese: 刘畅
Transcriptions

Liu Chang (Chinese: 劉暢; born 15 April 1993) is a Chinese actor and singer. He is best known for his roles in the film Tomb of the Sea Side Story: Hua Mei and series Reunion: The Sound of the Providence.

== Early life ==
Liu Chang born on 15 April 1993 in Tianshui, Gansu. In 2004, he appeared in the CCTV children's education drama The Story of Science and Technology Museum, playing as Ou Yangyang.

Liu Chang graduated with a degree in music from the Communication University of China. During his university life, he has participated in the 28th "Guangyuan Spring" Campus Singer Competition held by the school and won the champion "Little Baiyang" award along with both "Most Popular Male Singer" and "Best Internet Popularity" award.

== Career ==
Liu officially debuted as an actor in 2018 with the action series Tomb of the Sea, playing Wang Can. He then starred in action film Tomb of the Sea Side Story: Hua Mei where he played the leading role for the first time. Thereafter, he became known to the audience.

In 2020, he played a supporting role in the drama Symphony's Romance. In the same year, he started to gain increased attention and popularity with his role as Liu Sang in the popular action mystery series Reunion: The Sound of the Providence, based on Xu Lei's tomb-raiding novel. Also in 2020, he starred in the season 2 of The Lost Tomb: Reboot.

== Filmography ==
=== Television ===
Year	English title	Original title	Role
2004	The Story of Science and Technology Museum	科技馆的故事	Ou Yangyang
2018	Tomb of the Sea	沙海	Wang Can
2019	I'm So Pretty	玛丽学院	Song Qinghe
2020	Symphony's Romance	蜗牛与黄鹂鸟	Zhong Yu
2020	Reunion: The Sound of the Providence Season 1	重启之极海听雷第一季	Liu Sang
2020	Cross Fire	穿越火线	Gao Bosong
2020	Reunion: The Sound of the Providence Season 2	重启之极海听雷第二季	Liu Sang
2020		平妖往事	Liu Qianmo
2020	"When You're In Love"	当你恋爱时	Wen Qitao
		翻滚吧，小齿轮	Yang Keyi
2022	"Visual sound"	看见声音的你	Wei Zhen

=== Film ===
Year	English title	Original title	Role
2018	Tomb of the Sea Side Story: Hua Mei	沙海番外之画眉	Liu Sang
2021	Legend of Loulan: Ghost Army	楼兰传说：幽灵军队	Wu Tianze
	老九门之青山海棠	Yan Sanxing	

== Sound track ==
Date	English title	Original title	Notes
2020.07.20	"The Man in the Rain"	雨人	"The Lost Tomb: Reboot" OST
2020.08.10		此间漩涡	江宁探案录 Promotion Song
2020.09.24		平妖往事	平妖往事 OST
2020.10.30		人间粉墨	
