= The Rise of Phoenixes =

2018 Chinese TV series

- Official poster
- Also known as: 凰权·弈天下
- Genre: Historical fiction; Political; Romance
- Based on: Huang Quan by Tianxia Guiyuan
- Written by: Lu Yi; Zou Yue; Lu Jing (Tianxia Guiyuan); Wang Pei; Qiu Yongyi
- Directed by: Shen Yan; Liu Haibo
- Starring: Chen Kun; Ni Ni; Bai Jingting; Zhao Lixin; Ni Dahong; Yuan Hong; Zhang Xiaochen
- Composer: Dong Yingda
- Country of origin: China
- Original language: Mandarin
- No. of episodes: 70 (Uncut); 56 (TV)

Production
- Executive producers: Niu Jixin; Quan Haojin
- Production locations: Tang City Film Studios; Wuxi; Duyun
- Cinematography: Li Xi
- Editor: Zhang Jia
- Camera setup: Multiple-camera setup
- Running time: 45 minutes
- Production companies: Croton Media (China Syndication); K. Pictures; Hao Mai Culture; Chinese All Digital Publishing Group; New Film Association

Original release
- Network: Hunan TV; Netflix
- Release: August 14 – September 17, 2018

The Rise of Phoenixes
- Simplified Chinese: 天盛长歌
Transcriptions
Standard Mandarin
- Hanyu Pinyin: Tiānshèng Cháng Gē

The Rise of Phoenixes (Chinese: 天盛长歌; pinyin: Tiānshèng Cháng Gē) is a 2018 Chinese television drama based on the novel Huang Quan (Chinese: 凰权) by Tianxia Guiyuan, taking place in the fictional kingdom of Tiansheng, starring Chen Kun and Ni Ni in the main roles. On 14 August 2018, it premiered on Hunan Television, and Netflix on 14 September 2018. It became one of the top rated shows, was nominated for 'Best Drama Series' at the Asian Television Awards, and won 'Best Cinematography' at the 25th Shanghai Television Festival.

== Synopsis ==
Ning Yi (Chen Kun) is a clever prince of Tiansheng, hides his true self while plotting revenge and secretly seeks justice for his brother. Feng Zhiwei (Ni Ni), wrongly accused and banished, disguises herself as a man, joins Qingming Academy, and rises to become a court official through her talent and knowledge.

Feng Zhiwei, as Wei Zhi, earns the emperor’s trust during the succession struggle but must reveal her identity when he proposes marriage to his daughter. After a near-execution, she’s pardoned and sent on a mission with the Prince of Chu, where her mutual feelings with Ning Yi surface. Following his illness and recovery, they confess their love and plan to seek the emperor’s approval to marry. She discovers she is surviving royalty from the previous empire and, believing Tiansheng was built on her loved ones’ deaths, seeks revenge, including on Ning Yi.

== Cast ==
=== Main ===
Actor	Character	Description
Chen Kun	Ning Yi (宁弈)	The shrewd Prince of Chu hides his vengeance behind charm, building power in secret to avenge his family and protect the woman he loves.
Ni Ni	Feng Zhiwei (凤知微); Wei Zhi (魏知)	The last princess of Dacheng, hidden as a Qiu niece, rises as scholar Wei Zhi to survive and protect her family—falling for Ning Yi despite a vow never to marry him.

=== Supporting ===
==== Tiansheng Kingdom Royal Family ====
Actor	Character	Description
Ni Dahong	Ning Shizheng (宁世征)	The shrewd Tiansheng emperor rules with ruthless balance, showing rare affection—most of all for Consort Yan.
Hai Yitian	Ning Chuan (宁川)	The ruthless Crown Prince of Tiansheng is ambitious but lacks insight, relying on advisors and the Bloody Pagoda to crush rivals. Backed by the powerful Chang clan, he masterminded Ning Qiao’s death.
Shi An	Ning Sheng (宁昇)	The cruel and ambitious Prince of Yan, second son of Tiansheng, is a key contender for the throne, backed by the powerful Chang clan.
Liu Zhehui	Ning Qiao (宁乔)	The late Crown Prince Zhuangyi, third son of Tiansheng, was framed for treason and executed. Once close to Ning Yi, his death sparked Ning Yi’s quest for justice.
Tong Shao	Ning Yan (宁研)	The foolish and greedy Prince of Zhao, fifth son of Tiansheng, blindly follows the Crown Prince—until deceived by Headmaster Xin into opposing Ning Chuan as the “true” heir.
Qu Gaowei	Ning Qi (宁齐)	The seventh prince, Ning Qi, returns after a decade at the border. Once candid and devoted to his mother, he grows ruthless and ambitious—viewing Ning Yi as his greatest rival and stopping at nothing to eliminate him.
Wang Kaiyi	Ning Ji (宁霁)	Tenth prince of Tiansheng Kingdom, the Prince of Duan. The emperor's youngest son. A kind boy at heart, he trusts and respects Ning Yi.
Xu Hao	Ning Shao (宁韶)	Princess Shaoning of Tiansheng Kingdom. She is doted on by the Emperor and the Crown Prince.
Song Jiayang	Ning Qing (宁清)	Ning Yi's bodyguard. A subordinate to Ning Cheng.
Du Hongbin	Ning Zhuo (宁濯)	Ning Yi's bodyguard. A subordinate to Ning Cheng.
Mei Ting	Yale (雅乐)	Consort Yan, princess of the Sunset tribe and Ning Yi’s mother, was wrongly accused of witchcraft and imprisoned for twenty years—until Ning Yi uncovers the truth and secures her release.
Yu Mingjia	Chang Yongmei	Noble Consort Chang. Ning Sheng's birth mother and Ning Yi's step-mother. Member of the Chang clan, younger sister of the late empress (Ning Chuan's and Ning Shao’s mother).
Zhu Rui	Yueling (月泠)	Consort Qing, daughter of Sanhu and lover of Crown Prince Zhangsun Hong, poses as Ning Qi’s ally while secretly plotting the emperor’s downfall—sowing discord in court to fracture the dynasty.
Wang Oulei	Lady Wang (王才人)	A kind yet unfavored concubine of the emperor. Ning Qi's biological mother.
Chen Yingying	Yijun	Princess Consort of Wei.

==== Tiansheng Kingdom Court Officials and Servants ====
Actor	Character	Description
Ministers
Zhao Lixin	Xin Ziyan (辛子砚)	Headmaster of Qingming Academy, trusted advisor to the Crown Prince and mentor to Ning Yi. He was also close to the late Prince Ning Qiao.
Wang Ou	Hua Qiong (华琼)	Daughter of a family who fell victim to Chang Yuan, the Duke of Min. She allies with Ning Yi and Wei Zhi to bring Chang Yuan to justice and later becomes Zhiwei's best friend.
Yin Zhusheng	Chang Yuan (常远)	Duke of Min, head of the Chang family and powerful general, helped found Tiansheng Kingdom. As the emperor’s biggest threat, he wields vast court influence and is uncle to the Crown Prince and second prince.
Xu Wei	Chang Hai (常海)	Uncle of the Crown Prince and second prince, and the Duke of Min's younger brother. A loyal ally of the Crown Prince.
Lu Yong	Qiu Shangqi (秋尚奇)	Commander-in-chief of the infantry and leader of the Flying Shadow guards, he seems allied with the Crown Prince but is a cautious opportunist who prioritizes his own safety. He’s Feng Zhiwei’s maternal uncle.
Wang Ce	Gu Yan (顾衍)	Head of the Royal Guards, formerly second-in-command of the Bloody Pagoda, who betrayed his organization to serve the Tiansheng Kingdom.
Qin Yan	Yao Ying (姚英)	Grand Secretary of Internal Affairs. Ning Yi's ally.
Chang Cheng	Peng Pei (彭沛)	Ministry of Penalty. Ning Sheng's ally.
Ren Luomin	Ge Hongying (葛鸿英)	Assistant minister. Ning Yan's ally.
Zhao Chengshun	Chunyu Hong (淳于鸿)	Chunyu Meng's father.
Servants
Hou Yansong	Zhao Yuan (赵渊)	The emperor's trusted head eunuch. In charge of the Internal Affairs Department.
He Lei	Ning Cheng (宁澄)	Ning Yi's loyal bodyguard.
Liu Yun	Manchun (曼春)	Ning Yi's personal attendant.
Rong Fei	Wu Ying (吴英)	A eunuch sent by the emperor to spy on Ning Yi, who stays loyal to the prince after learning the truth behind his plans.
Chen Liang	Ah Chou (阿丑)	Gu Yan's trusted aide.

==== People of Tiansheng Kingdom ====
Actor	Character	Description
Hu Ke	Dahua (大花)	Xin Ziyan's wife. A very jealous woman who also deeply loves her husband.
Xu Jian	Yan Huaishi (燕怀石)	Son of the influential Yan clan of Minhai, he enters Qingming Academy alongside Feng Zhiwei (disguised as Wei Zhi) and befriends her, aware of her true identity. He is betrothed to Hua Qiong.
Liu Haoyan	Chunyu Meng (淳于猛)	Son of a powerful warrior. He is loyal to Ning Yi and aids him in his conquest.
Mao Yi	Yao Yangyu (姚扬宇)	Son of Yao Ying. He is the top student at Qingming Academy, and is unruly and arrogant.
Wang Jiaqi	Zhuyin (珠茵)	Daughter of one of Ning Qiao's trusted generals. She is a courtesan at Lanxiang court who collects intelligence for Ning Yi.
Qiu clan
Liu Mintao	Qiu Mingying (秋明缨)	Sister of Qiu Shangqi and wife of Gu Heng, former Fire Wind commander and Bloody Pagoda leader. She raises Zhiwei as her own.
Yang Ziya	Madame Qiu (秋夫人)	Qiu Shangqi's wife.
Deng Sha	Yuhua (玉华)	Qiu Shangqi’s fifth concubine, who suspects the truth about the Feng children’s identity.
Xu Ge	Qiu Yuluo (秋玉落)	Qiu Shangqi’s spoiled daughter, betrothed to Ning Yi by the Emperor. She tries to humiliate Feng Zhiwei and her brother but often ends up bullied by them.
Chang Long	Feng Hao (凤皓)	Qiu Mingying’s biological son and decoy for Feng Zhiwei, the Dacheng Remnant. A cheeky manchild devoted to his mother and sister, he ultimately sacrifices himself to save them.

==== Cheng Dynasty ====
Actor	Character	Description
Bai Jingting	Gu Nanyi (顾南衣)	An assassin of the Bloody Pagoda and Feng Zhiwei’s loyal bodyguard, who sees her as the most important person in his life.
Xiu Qing	Zong Chen (宗宸)	A Bloody Pagoda leader and mentor to Gu Nanyi, he poses as a private school teacher but is a master of martial arts and medicine.
Hei Zi	Gu Heng (顾衡)	Previous leader of the Bloody Pagoda. Feng Zhiwei's foster father; Qiu Mingying's husband.
Tan Kai	Emperor of Da Cheng (大成皇帝)	Feng Zhiwei's father.
Zhang Dinghan	Empress of Da Cheng (大成皇后)	Feng Zhiwei's mother.

==== Jinshi Tribe ====
Actor	Character	Description
Zhang Xiaochen	Helian Zheng (赫连铮)	Heir of Jinshi, a northern nomadic kingdom, who seeks Zhiwei’s hand. Captivated by her strength, he’s willing to do anything to support her dreams—clashing with Ning Yi’s plans.
Li Jingjing	Liu Mudan (刘牡丹)	Grand Royal Consort. Helian Zheng's stepmother, who raised him after his mother's death.
Qin Yong	San Sun (三隼)	General of Jinshi.
Zhou Kui	Helian Lie (赫连烈)	Helian Zheng’s uncle and the late Jinshi King’s twin brother, who declared himself King Regent after his brother’s death.
Deng Hanyu	Helian Tu (赫连图)	Current King of Jinshi, the younger half-brother of Helian Zheng. Used by Helian Lie as a puppet king.

==== Kingdom of Yue ====
Actor	Character	Description
Yuan Hong	Jin Siyu (晋思羽)	Third prince of Yue, the Prince of An.
Shen Xiaohai	Zhanbi (占壁)	A spy of the Kingdom of Yue, Yale's lover.

Extended cast

Actor	Character	Description
Chi Feng	Aunt Ziying (凌英姑姑)	
Chen Sisi	Erhua (二花)	Dahua's younger sister, sister-in-law of Xin Ziyan.
Dai Xu	Chang Zhongxin (常忠信)	The second son of Chang Yuan.
Lv Xia	Liu Meiduo (刘梅朵)	The younger sister of Liu Mudan. She is the former fiancé of Si Yinlun and the former lover of Helian Zheng.
Zhang Zhizhong	Xu Qirui (徐启瑞)	Minister of Rites.
Sun Ning	Hu Shengshan (胡圣山)	
Liu Jun	Wu Yuanming (吴渊铭)	
Yang Haoyu	Zhou Xizhong (周希中)	
Dang Haoyu	San Hu (三虎)	
Liu Haibo	Zhangsun Hong (长孙弘)	Fourth prince of the Cheng Dynasty, Feng Zhiwei's older brother.
Zhang Ruoxing	Qian Yan (钱彦)	
Wu You	Ni Wenyu (倪文昱)	
Zheng Yu	Si Xian (司宪)	
Luan Yuanhui	Chen Shao (陈绍)	
Dai Wenwen	Si Yinle (司隐乐)	The younger sister of Si Yinlun.
Sui Yumeng	Yao Yangci (姚扬慈)	Secretary Yao's daughter. She is very talented and clever.
Zhang Xinying	Hua Gongmei (华宫眉)	
He Miao	Hu Jingshui (胡静水)	
Cai Yatong	Jiarong (佳荣)	Ning Yi's maternal cousin, and one of the few remaining members of the Sunset tribe.
Yue Xin	Siling (四翎)	
Zhao Yanmin	Li Shiru (厉世和)	
Chen Youwang	Elder Sizhi (四知长老)	
Yan Zhiping	Liu Yuanzheng (刘院正)	
Tang Xu	Royal Physician Lu (卢御医)	
Dong Zhao	Royal Physician Zhang (张御医)	
Zhang Shihong	Royal Physician (御医)	
Wu Yuanfang	Royal Physician (御医)	
Zhang Maolin	Xu Shichang (许事昌)	
Li Bin	Royal Astronomer (灵台丞)	
Xu Shaoying	Guo Jun (郭俊)	A general and subordinate of Jin Siyu.
Chi Wen	Elder of Sunset Tribe (日落族族长)	
Deng Mingjiang	Officer guarding the cliff (守崖官)	
Qu Guoxiang	Old Horsekeeper (老马夫)	An assassin of the Bloody Pagoda who was taken in by the Crown Prince after the fall of the Cheng Dynasty.
Kang Fuzhen	Young Horsekeeper (小马夫)	Old Horsekeeper's son. A kind-hearted young man who saves Wei Zhi's life.
Chen Liwei	Porter (担夫)	
Jiang Zhongwei	Physician of Pu Courtyard (浦园御医)	
Wen Zheng	Officer of the Seal (奉印大臣)	
Teng Yi	Sanhua (三花)	Dahua's younger sister, sister-in-law of Xin Ziyan.
Zhang Yuxiao	Sihua (四花)	Dahua's younger sister, sister-in-law of Xin Ziyan.
Cheng Guodong	Sir Hu (胡先生)	
Zhang Ye	Changji (长吉)	A guard of Princess Shaoning.
Yang Kaicheng	Chang Zhongli (常忠礼)	
Tang Xiawa	Chang Zhongli's wife (常忠礼夫人)	
Jin Jing	Hushi (扈室)	
Ma Weifu	Attendant Li (刘管事)	
Cui Youbin	Chang Zhongyi (常忠义)	The first son of Chang Yuan.
Feng Jun	Nursemaid Chen (陈嬷嬷)	
Zhang Yixin	Consort Chang's nursemaid (常贵妃嬷嬷)	
Shi Min	Palace maid of Hua Gongmei (华宫眉宫女)	
Xie Guohua	Consort Chang's attendant (常贵妃内侍)	
Xu Li	Ziyin (梓音)	Lady Wang's maid.
Zhou Xin	Zhuxin (烛心)	
Zhang Ziting	Duo'er (朵儿)	A maid of Noble Consort Chang.
Hu Yilin	Ying'er (莹儿)	
Zhang Bo	Chen Ming (陈明)	
Sun Yiyang	Xuanchen (宣辰)	
Wu Bohang	Lu Ming (陆明)	
Wang Jiasui	Qinyu (沁玉)	
Zhang Luyao	Lianmeng (怜梦)	
Wang Ailin	Bixia (碧霞)	
Jiang Yunyun	Xixue (惜雪)	
Wang Yijie	Xiwen (熙雯)	A courtesan at the House of Lanxiang.
Tian Shuang	Qianmo (千茉)	A courtesan at the House of Lanxiang.
Cao Lei	Prison Head (牢头)	
Wang Hong	Sun Xiang (孙祥)	
Li Zhenyu	Li Cai (李才)	A guard of Ning Qi.
Chang Wei	Huo Laosan (霍老三)	Once a prison officer who guarded and befriended Ning Yi during his years of captivity.
Ma Zhenrong	Song Laoer (宋老二)	
Luo Siyu	Madam (老鸨)	Madam of the dance house.
	Yunyun	A courtesan at the House of Lanxiang.
Zhang Bo	Chahu (茶壶)	
Xu Zhifei	Guest (客人)	
Wu Youxi	Physician 1 (郎中甲)	
Song Dongxiao	Physician 2 (郎中乙)	
Shen Yang	Xingyi (邢义)	
Xing Xiaoyan	Song Jie (宋杰)	An Imperial Guard sent to Minhai.
Wang Chen	Yu Xiu (余休)	
Zheng Xiaozhong	Lin Renqi (林任奇)	Investigatory Officer.
Xiang Yu	Commander of Ning Qi's troops (宁齐首领)	
Wang Xi	Captain Wei (卫队长)	
Li Zhenyu	Head Pirate (海盗头目)	
Yao Weiping	Monk (禅师)	
Cao Yonggang	Monk Wanjie (万劫禅师)	Brother of Minister Xu. Author of Overview of Dacheng.
Li Du	Coroner (仵作)	
Fang Haowei	Maid of Qiu Manor (秋府丫鬟)	
Zhang Ya'nan	Noble lady (贵女)	
Jiang Dongmei	Royal consort (贵妃)	
Wang Yanjun	Ning Sheng's subordinate (宁昇幕僚)	
Lao Yuan	Qingming Academy's attendant (青溟书院门房)	
Lu Chenyang	Dingsan (丁三)	A servant of Minister Yao.
Wang Quan	Shaoning's senior eunuch (韶宁大太监)	
Gao Fengyang	Shaoning's junior eunuch (韶宁小太监)	
Yao Zhuoran	Female commoner (民妇)	
Zhang Zisheng	Commoner's husband (民妇丈夫)	
Liu Muyu	Xin Ziyan's servant (辛子砚仆人)	
Liu Hanyang	Tie Nan (铁男)	
Li Honglei	Boss (店铺老板)	
Zhao Shuai	Waiter (店小二)	
Zhu Feng	Officer 1 (官兵甲)	
Sun Letian	Officer 2 (官兵乙)	
Shi Yafeng	Crippled man (瘸子)	
Zhang Mengqiang	Store owner (摊主)	
Ma Shuo	Jailer (狱卒甲)	
Chang Li	Prisoner (犯人甲)	
Yang Feng	Coroner 2 (仵作甲)	
Yi Yajun	Private adviser (师爷)	
Chang Li	Human trafficker (人牙子)	
Song Qingchang	Elder (长老)	
Wang Junheng	Medicine shop employee (药铺伙计)	
Jiang Hongshi	Physician (御医)	
Chong Yunpeng	Physician (御医)	
Li Zhencheng	Officer (官员)	
Gao Wei	Liu Guang (刘光)	
Huang Junchao	Second in-command of White Head Cliff (白头崖副将)	
Li Wenping	Chen Shao's father (陈绍父亲)	
Yu Ganglong	Execution military officer (行邢武官)	
Chen Zhuankai	Execution civil officer (行邢文官)	
Cui Jun	Servant (仆役乙)	
Shi Junxian	General (将军甲)	
Liu Songbin	Cheng Dynasty elders (大成遗老)	
Zhang Jianguo	Cheng Dynasty elders (大成遗老)	
Zhang Dunyou	Cheng Dynasty elders (大成遗老)	
Zhu Song	Cheng Dynasty elders (大成遗老)	
Chi Dan	Jinshi Ambassadors (金狮使臣)	
Yin Xiaoming	Jinshi Ambassadors (金狮使臣)	
Tao Ci	Jinshi Officials (金狮大臣)	
Yang Minggang	Jinshi Officials (金狮大臣)	
Ding Hao	Jinshi Officials (金狮大臣)	
Yin Gang	Jinshi Officials (金狮大臣)	
Xu Zhengzhi	Jinshi Officials (金狮大臣)	
Han Meimei	Matrons of Honor (喜娘)	
Liu Fang	Matrons of Honor (喜娘)	
Yang Huilin	Matrons of Honor (喜娘)	
Xu Li	Nanny (乳母)	The wet nurse of Helian Tu.
Guo Yinyu	Descendant of Chang (常氏子侄)	
Jing Haifeng	Descendant of Chang (常氏子侄)	
Zhang Zhi	Descendant of Chang (常氏子侄)	
Lei Chao	Descendant of Chang (常氏子侄)	
Liu Bingchao	Descendant of Chang (常氏子侄)	

== Soundtrack ==
No.	Title	Lyrics	Music	Singers	Length
1.	"To No Avail (奈何)" (Insert song)	Dong Yingda	Dong Yingda	Sam Lee	3:40
2.	"If Like Yesterday (如昨)" (Concept song)	Zhang Pengpeng, Lin Qiao	Wu Shuting	Liu Xijun	5:06
3.	"Schemes of the Heart (心·机)" (Insert song)	Cui Shu	Dong Yingda	Tracy Wang	3:02
4.	"Schemes; Love Comes Along (心机·爱相随)" (Insert song)	Dong Yingda	Dong Yingda	Xu Hongbin	3:02
5.	"Like Dust (轻尘)" (Insert song)	Zhang Ying	Chen Xueran	Tang Hanxiao	3:07
6.	"Why to No Avail (何·奈何)" (Ending theme song)	Dong Yingda	Dong Yingda	Ni Ni	2:58

== Production ==
On 27 27 April 2017, the extended cast was revealed; Principal photography began on 27 May 2017, and concluded on 12 December 2017. The series was also noted for using "real-time" voice recording during filming. It was the first television drama filmed at Tang City Film Studios, Xiangyang; the location was chosen for its historical authenticity and uniqueness. Additional filming took place in Wuxi and Duyun. It received distribution licence to broadcast 70 episodes.

=== Crew ===
- Directors: Shen Yan and Liu Haibo (Chinese Style Relationship)
- Writers: Lu Jing - original author, Lu Yi, Zou Yue, Wang Pei, and Qiu Yongyi
- Costume Designer & Artistic Director: William Chang (The Flowers of War, The Grandmaster)
- Additional Costume Designers: Lu Fengshan and Fang Sizhe
- Stunt Choreographer: Yuan Bin (Flying Swords of Dragon Gate)
- Stills Photographer: Bao Xiangyu (Coming Home, Mojin: The Lost Legend)
- Composer: Dong Yingda (Sweet Sixteen, All Quiet in Peking)
- Cinematographer: Li Xi (Love is Not Blind)
- Artistic Director: Kun Xiaotong
- Editor: Zhang Jia (Go Lala Go!)
- Etiquette Consultant: Li Bin (Nirvana in Fire, The Legend of Mi Yue)

== Reception ==
The series’ slow pacing and complex plot led to low television ratings, reducing the original 70 episodes to 56. However, it received strong online acclaim, rated 8.3/10 on Douban by over 113,000 users, ranking it among the top-rated TV series of the year.

== Ratings ==
Hunan Satellite TV first broadcast ratings
Air date	Episode	CSM52 city network ratings			National Internet ratings		
Air date	Episode	Ratings (%)	Audience share (%)	Rank	Ratings (%)	Audience share (%)	Rank
August 14, 2018	1-2	0.558	2.09	3	0.73	2.89	4
August 15, 2018	3-4	0.539	2.05	5	0.69	2.76	5
August 16, 2018	5-6	0.486	1.84	5	0.73	2.82	5
August 18, 2018	7	0.233	0.92	10	0.48	1.96	5
August 19, 2018	8-9	0.425	1.56	6	0.58	2.32	3
August 20, 2018	10-11	0.474	1.75	6	0.63	2.45	9
August 21, 2018	12-13	0.416	1.58	7	0.5	1.92	4
August 22, 2018	14-15	0.379	1.39	7	0.53	2.03	4
August 23, 2018	16-17	0.453	1.7	9	0.65	2.51	3
August 24, 2018	18	0.154	0.61	16	0.16	0.69	10
August 25, 2018	19	0.262	0.97	8	0.34	1.36	3
August 26, 2018	20-21	0.35	1.3	6	0.46	1.78	2
August 27, 2018	22-23	0.367	1.35	7	0.46	1.78	4
August 28, 2018	24-25	0.382	1.43	6	0.52	1.96	3
August 29, 2018	26-27	0.434	1.62	6	0.46	1.75	4
August 30, 2018	28-29	0.396	1.48	6	0.48	1.85	3
September 1, 2018	30	0.303	1.04	7	0.33	1.12	4
September 2, 2018	31-32	0.466	1.78	6	0.38	1.51	5
September 3, 2018	33-34	0.44	1.69	6	0.36	1.48	6
September 4, 2018	35-36	0.533	2.11	5	0.41	1.65	4
September 5, 2018	37-38	0.536	2.16	5	0.42	1.82	3
September 6, 2018	39-40	0.525	2.14	6	0.39	1.64	4
September 7, 2018	41	0.331	1.29	8	0.25	0.98	8
September 8, 2018	42	0.34	1.35	7	0.35	1.39	7
September 9, 2018	43-44	0.498	1.98	6	0.37	1.5	6
September 10, 2018	45-46	0.625	2.51	5	0.40	1.64	7
September 11, 2018	47-48	0.532	2.15	5	0.39	1.62	7
September 12, 2018	49-50	0.507	2.02	5	0.38	1.57	8
September 13, 2018	51-52	0.493	2.01	7	0.41	1.70	6
September 14, 2018	53	0.3	1.15	10	0.24	0.93	13
September 15, 2018	54	0.437	1.65	5	0.45	1.69	7
September 16, 2018	55-56	0.569	2.17	5	0.46	1.87	7

== Awards and nominations ==
Year	Award	Category	Nominated work	Result	Ref.
2017	24th Huading Awards	Best Actor	Chen Kun	Nominated	
2017	24th Huading Awards	Best Actress (Ancient Drama)	Ni Ni	Nominated	
2017	24th Huading Awards	Best Supporting Actor	Zhao Lixin	Nominated	
2017	25th Shanghai Television Festival	Best Television Series		Nominated	
2017	25th Shanghai Television Festival	Best Director	Shen Yan, Liu Haibo	Nominated	
2017	25th Shanghai Television Festival	Best Actor	Chen Kun	Nominated	
2017	25th Shanghai Television Festival	Best Cinematography	Li Xi	Won	
2017	25th Shanghai Television Festival	Best Art Direction		Nominated	
2017	24th Asian Television Awards	Best Drama Series	The Rise of Phoenixes	Nominated	
2017	Weibo Awards Ceremony	Most Anticipated Television Series	The Rise of Phoenixes	Won	
