= Ni Ni =

Chinese actress

- 倪妮
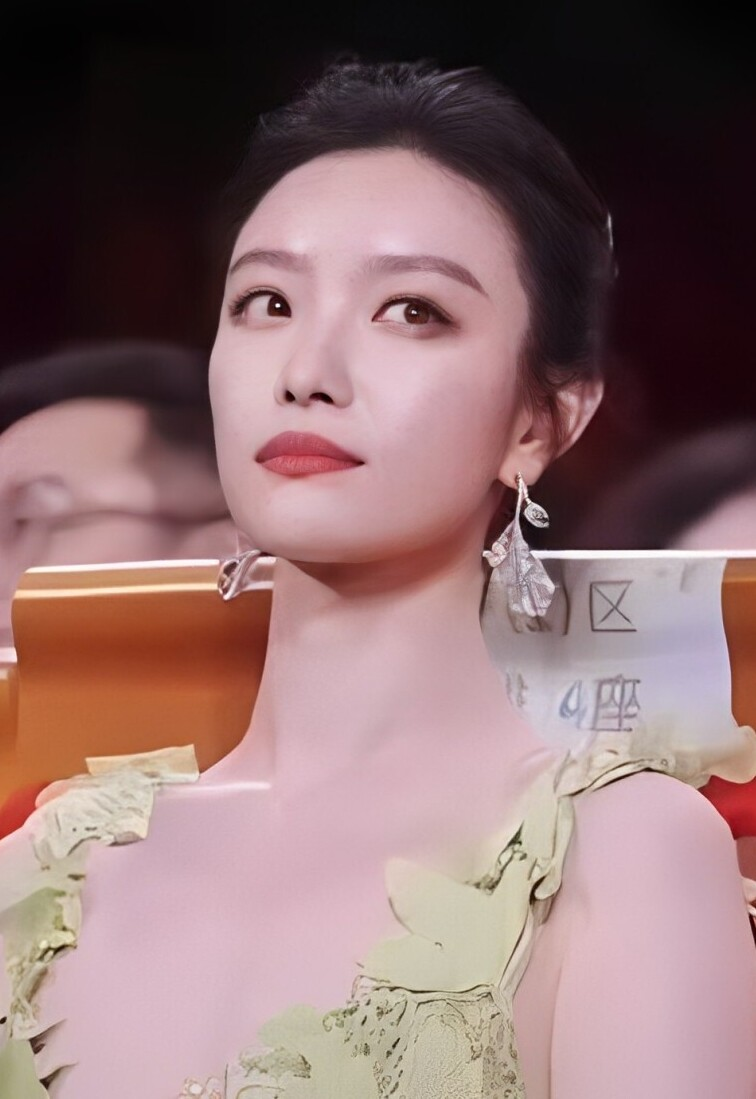
- Ni at the 35th Golden Rooster Awards
- Born: Nanjing, Jiangsu, China
- Education: Communication University of China, Nanjing
- Occupation: Actress
- Years active: 2011–present
- Agent: Ni Ni Studio

Chinese name
- Traditional Chinese: 倪妮
- Simplified Chinese: 倪妮
Transcriptions
Standard Mandarin
- Hanyu Pinyin: Ní Nī

Ni Ni (Chinese: 倪妮; pinyin: Ní Nī) is a Chinese actress. After rising to fame with Zhang Yimou's The Flowers of War (2011), she starred in the films Up in the Wind (2013), Fleet of Time (2014), Lost in the Stars (2022), and in the television series The Rise of Phoenixes (2018), Love and Destiny (2019), and My Best Friend's Story (2020). She is considered as one of the "New Four Dan Actresses" by Southern Metropolis Daily.

== Early life ==
Ni was born in Nanjing, Jiangsu, China. She graduated from the Communication University of China, Nanjing, majoring in television broadcasting and hosting.

== Career ==
Ni made her debut in Zhang Yimou's war film The Flowers of War, playing the lead female character "Yu Mo". She received acclaim for her performance in the film and rose to fame.

In 2012 and 2013, Li starred in the mystery film Redemption alongside Liu Ye, romance film Love Will Tear Us Apart and road-trip drama film Up in the Wind.

In 2014, Ni starred in the coming-of-age film Fleet of Time. In 2015, Ni starred alongside Angelababy in the Chinese remake of Bride Wars.

In 2016, Ni starred in the Chinese-French fantasy The Warriors Gate, written by Luc Besson. The same year, she starred in the romantic comedy film Suddenly Seventeen, directed by Zhang Yimou's daughter.

In 2017, Ni starred in fantasy action film Wu Kong, as well as science fiction wuxia film The Thousand Faces of Dunjia directed by Tsui Hark.

In 2018, Ni starred in her first television drama, The Rise of Phoenixes alongside Chen Kun. She released her first single, "Why to No Avail" as part of the soundtrack of the series. Forbes China listed Ni under their 30 Under 30 Asia 2017 list which consisted of 30 influential people under 30 years old who have had a substantial effect in their fields.

In 2019, Ni returned to the big screen in the crime heist film Savage. She then made her theater debut in the play One One Zero Eight directed by Stan Lai. The same year, Ni starred in the fantasy romance drama Love and Destiny alongside Chang Chen. The series received positive reviews, and Ni gained acclaim for her portrayal of a fairy maiden that went through numerous struggles to attain happiness.

In 2020, Ni starred alongside Andy Lau in the action thriller Shock Wave 2. The same year she returned to television in CCTV-8's My Best Friend's Story, which earned her a Magnolia Award for Best Actress nomination at the 27th Shanghai Television Festival.

In 2021, Ni starred in romantic-drama film Yanagawa, directed by Korean-Chinese filmmaker Zhang Lü. For her highly praised performance in this film, she was nominated for Best Actress at the 35th Golden Rooster Awards. In the same year, Ni was cast in the drama Night Wanderer, adapted from the popular time-travel themed novel "Ye Lv Ren" (夜旅人) by Zhao Xi Zhi alongside Deng Lun.

In 2022, Ni made her return to the big screen in Lost in the Stars alongside Zhu Yilong, a mystery crime film was produced by Chen Sicheng. The film was then released theatrically in early 2023 and became a huge commercial success when it grossed over ¥3.524 billion at the box office in China and won her the Golden Deer Award for Best Actress at the 18th Changchun Film Festival.

In 2024, Ni was invited as a member of the jury for Asian New Talent Awards of the 26th Shanghai International Film Festival. In April 2025, Ni served as a jury member at the 15th Beijing International Film Festival.

== Endorsements ==
Ni has been the Chinese ambassador for Jaeger-LeCoultre since 2011 and now a global spokesperson for Jaeger-LeCoultre. She was named as the global ambassador for SK-II in 2013.

In 2014, she was selected to be the brand ambassador for Uniqlo in China, and became a global spokesperson for Uniqlo since 2019.

She was the official global ambassador of Tiffany & Co. between 2017 and 2019.

Ni has been the official brand ambassador of Gucci since 2017 and a global ambassador for Gucci's Eyewear since 2019. Since 2022, she has been announced as global brand ambassador of Gucci. She became the global face of Gucci Eyewear through various collections' campaigns such as Spring Summer 2017, Fall Winter 2017, Spring Summer 2018, Fall Winter 2018, Sprring Summer 2019, Fall Winter 2019, Spring Summer 2020, Spring Summer 2021, Fall Winter 2021, Spring Summer 2022, Fall Winter 2022, Spring Summer 2023, Fall Winter 2023 and Spring Summer 2024. In January 2020, she became the global face of the Gucci's Chinese New Year with Mickey Mouse-themed collection campaign along with Earl Cave and Zoë Bleu that shot by American photographer and director Harmony Korine. In January 2024, Ni starred as the global face of the Gucci's Valigeria campaign for the Savoy collection along with her co-star in the TV series Love and Destiny - Chang Chen. In October 2024, Ni starred as the global face of the Gucci's Holiday 2024 campaign "Gucci Gift: Stories from The Savoy" alongside Kendall Jenner, Jessica Chastain and Danielle Pizzorni. In January 2025, Ni starred as the global face of the Gucci's Chinese New Year 2025 campaign "Year of the Snake" alongside Xiao Zhan.

Ni had been the global spokesperson of Bobbi Brown Cosmetics since 2019 and a global ambassador of Cindy Chao The Art Jewel since 2021.

Since 2022, French luxury beauty house Lancôme announced Ni as their global skincare and fragrance ambassador. On 25 August 2024, Lancôme announced that Ni was appointed a new role as global spokesperson for the brand.

In 2022, Ni had been the brand spokesperson of L'Oréal Hair-care. Since 2024, Vaseline announced Ni as the brand spokesperson in the Asia-Pacific region.

== Filmography ==
=== Film ===
Year	English title	Chinese title	Role	Ref.
2011	The Flowers of War	金陵十三钗	Yu Mo	
2013	Redemption	杀戒	Jiang Yue	
2013	Love Will Tear Us Apart	我想和你好好的	Miaomiao	
2013	Up in the Wind	等风來	Cheng Yumeng	
2014	Fleet of Time	匆匆那年	Fang Hui	
2015	Bride Wars	新娘大作战	Ma Li	
2016	The Warriors Gate	勇士之門	Su Lin	
2016	Suddenly Seventeen	28岁未成年	Liang Xia	
2017	Wu Kong	悟空传	Ah Zi	
2017	The Thousand Faces of Dunjia	奇門遁甲	Metal Dragonfly	
2019	Savages	雪暴	Sun Yan	
2020	Shock Wave 2	拆弹专家2	Pong Ling	
2021	1921	1921	Wang Huiwu	
2021	Yanagawa	漫长的告白	Liu Chuan	
2022	Lost in the Stars	消失的她	Chen Mai / Shen Man	
2024	A Man and A Woman	一个男人和一个女人	Woman	
2024	Bound in Heaven	捆绑上天堂	Xia You	
2025	A Gilded Game	猎金游戏	Anna	
2025	Dongji Rescue	东极岛	Ah Hua	

=== Television series ===
Year	English title	Chinese title	Role	Notes/Ref.
2018	The Rise of Phoenixes	天盛长歌	Feng Zhiwei	
2019	Love and Destiny	宸汐缘	Ling Xi	
2020	With You	在一起	Ping Xiaoan	Part 2: Ferryman
2020	My Best Friend's Story	流金岁月	Zhu Suosuo	
2021	Medal of the Republic	功勋	Sun Yuqin	
2022	The Heart of Genius	天才基本法	Qiu Yue	Cameo
2023	Parallel World	西出玉门	Ye Liuxi	
2026	Vanished Name	隐身的名字	Ren Xiaoming	
TBA	Night Wanderer	夜旅人	Zong Ying	

=== Television show ===
Year	English title	Chinese title	Role	Ref.
2015	Wonderful Friends	奇妙的朋友	Cast member	

=== Short film and documentary ===
Year	English title	Chinese title	Role	Ref.
2011	Zhang Yimou and His Flowers of War	张艺谋和他的金陵十三钗		
2013	Touched	心动		
2013	Always Online	爱在线	Miao Miao	
2013	F-Type	F-TYPE非你莫属	DJ	
2014	Cartier Wedding Series	卡地亚2014婚礼系列		
2015	Cartier Wedding Series	卡地亚2015婚礼系列		
2017	Dissecting Yourself	解剖自己		
2018	1/2 Encounter	1/2的相遇		
2019	One One Zero Eight	幺幺洞捌·妮行		

=== Theatre ===
Year	English title	Chinese title	Role	Ref.
2019	One One Zero Eight	幺幺洞捌	Shu Tong	

== Discography ==
Year	English title	Chinese title	Album	Notes/Ref.
2015	"Today You Will Marry Me"	今天你要嫁给我	Bride Wars OST	with Angelababy, Chen Xiao & Zhu Yawen
2015	"Do You Hear Me"	你有没有听到我	Wonderful Friends OST	
2018	"Why to No Avail"	何奈何	The Rise of Phoenixes OST	
2020	"Dare of the Awakening"			

== Accolades ==
=== Awards and nominations ===
Year	Award	Category	Film	Result	Ref.
Major awards
2012	6th Asian Film Awards	Best Newcomer	The Flowers of War	Won	
2012	12th Chinese Film Media Awards	Best Actress	The Flowers of War	Nominated	
2012	12th Chinese Film Media Awards	Best Newcomer	The Flowers of War	Nominated	
2012	12th Chinese Film Media Awards	Most Popular Actress	The Flowers of War	Won	
2012	21st Shanghai Film Critics Awards	Best Actress	The Flowers of War	Won	
2012	7th Chinese Young Generation Film Forum Awards	Best New Actress	The Flowers of War	Won	
2013	15th Huabiao Awards	Outstanding New Actress	The Flowers of War	Nominated	
2017	9th Macau International Movie Festival	Best Actress	Wu Kong	Nominated	
2018	24th Huading Awards	Best Actress (Ancient Drama)	The Rise of Phoenixes	Nominated	
2018	14th Changchun Film Festival	Best Actress	Suddenly Seventeen	Nominated	
2019	6th The Actors of China Awards	Best Actress (Emerald Category)	The Rise of Phoenixes	Nominated	
2019	26th Huading Awards	Best Actress (Historical drama)	Love and Destiny	Nominated	
2019	Golden Bud – The Fourth Network Film And Television Festival	Best Actress	Love and Destiny	Nominated	
2020	7th The Actors of China Awards	Best Actress (Emerald)	Love and Destiny	Nominated	
2021	27th Shanghai Television Festival	Best Actress	My Best Friend's Story	Nominated	
2021	13th Macau International Movie Festival	Best Supporting Actress	Shock Wave 2	Nominated	
2022	36th Hundred Flowers Awards	Best Actress	1921	Shortlisted	
2022	35th Golden Rooster Awards	Best Actress	Yanagawa	Nominated	
2023	14th China Film Director's Guild Awards	Best Actress	Yanagawa	Shortlisted	
2023	18th Changchun Film Festival	Best Actress	Lost in the Stars	Won	
2023	8th Golden Crane Awards	Best Actress	Lost in the Stars	Won	
2023	15th Macau International Movie Festival	Best Actress	Lost in the Stars	Nominated	
2024	37th Hundred Flowers Awards	Best Actress	Lost in the Stars	Nominated	
Other awards
2012	Entertainment Live Award Ceremony	Most Anticipated Film Figure	The Flowers of War	Won	
2012	3rd LeTV Entertainment Awards	Most Popular Film Actress	The Flowers of War	Won	
2012	Grazia Award Night	Trend New Force of the Year	—N/a	Won	
2013	Fashion Power Awards	Most Popular Actress	—N/a	Won	
2014	China Content Marketing Awards	Best Image Brand Endorser	Always Online	Won	
2015	Sina Entertainment 15th Anniversary Award Ceremony	Outstanding Youth	—N/a	Won	
2017	China Screen Ranking	Trend of the Year	—N/a	Won	
2018	Weibo Awards Night	Weibo Goddess	—N/a	Won	
2019	Cosmo Glam Night	Person of the Year (Dream)	—N/a	Won	
2019	8th iQIYI All-Star Carnival	Drama Actress of the Year	—N/a	Won	
2019	Sina Fashion Awards	Person of the Year	—N/a	Won	
2019	16th Esquire Man At His Best Awards	Most Beautiful Woman of the Year	—N/a	Won	
2023	Tencent Video All Star Night 2023	Quality TV Drama Actress of the Year	—N/a	Won	

=== Forbes China Celebrity 100 ===
Year	Rank	Ref.
2017	72nd	
2019	64th	
2020	70th	
