= Zhang Mo (director) =

21st-century Chinese writer and film director

- Born: March 31, 1983 (age 43); Xi'an, Shaanxi, China
- Education: Columbia University (BA); Tisch School of the Arts (MFA)
- Occupation: Film editor
- Parent(s): Zhang Yimou (father); Xiao Hua (mother)

Zhang Mo (born 31 March 1983; Chinese: 张末; pinyin: zhāng mò) is a Chinese writer, film editor and director who has worked on such films as Coming Home, The Flowers of War and A Simple Noodle Story. She is the daughter of renowned film director Zhang Yimou and has worked alongside him on many of his projects. In 2016 she made her directorial debut with the film Suddenly Seventeen.

== Biography ==
Zhang was born on March 31, 1983, in Xi'an, Shaanxi to film director Zhang Yimou and his wife Xiao Hua. She moved with her family to the United States at age fifteen to study at an American high school. She then enrolled at Columbia University and graduated with a Bachelor of Arts in architecture. She decided not to pursue a career in architecture any further feeling it to be too restrictive in allowing her to express her emotions. Leaving university, Zhang enrolled at the Tisch School of the Arts where she studied filmmaking. After graduating from Tisch with a Master of Fine Arts degree in film production, she went back to China to work alongside her father Zhang Yimou on some of his films. After gaining credit as an editor on the films Under the Hawthorn Tree and A Simple Noodle Story Zhang was given the role of assistant director on her fathers Hollywood blockbuster The Flowers of War.

In 2016 Zhang directed her first film Suddenly Seventeen, a film about 28-year-old woman who turns into the 17-year-old version of herself. Released in China, the film had a limited global release and was met with mixed reviews despite being financially successful.

Zhang married Daniel Wade Manwaring (孟丹青), CEO of IMAX China and former Creative Artists Agency executive, in October 2012. She was previously married to an American man named Tovey from May 2006 to late 2008.
