= Deng Lun =

Chinese actor (born 1992)

- 邓伦
- Born: October 21, 1992 (age 33); Shijiazhuang, Hebei, China
- Education: Shanghai Theatre Academy
- Occupations: Actor, Entrepreneur
- Years active: 2013-present
- Agent: Deng Lun Studio
- Height: 184 cm (6 ft 0 in)

Chinese name
- Traditional Chinese: 鄧倫
- Simplified Chinese: 邓伦
Transcriptions

Deng Lun (simplified Chinese: 邓伦; traditional Chinese: 鄧倫; born 21 October 1992), also known as Allen Deng, is a Chinese actor, singer and businessman. He made his acting debut in the romance drama Flowers in Fog (2012). He also starred in the series Because of Meeting You (2017) and Ashes of Love (2018).

== Early life and education ==
Deng Lun was born in Shijiazhuang, Hebei Province. His parents were reportedly in the military. He grew up with his grandparents and continues to spend time with his grandmother. In 2011, he graduated from the Performance Department of Shanghai Theatre Academy.

== Career ==
Deng Lun was recognized by China Central Television (CCTV) for his outstanding performance in Faith Makes Great: Tianhe (2021). Among the 'Post-90s Generation' of Chinese actors, he holds a string of viewership records, including the distinction of being the actor with the most television series achieving ratings over 1%. His five dramas (Because of Meeting You, Sweet Dreams, Ashes of Love, My True Friend, and Mr. Fighting) have all surpassed this benchmark. He is the only actor from the 'Post-90s Generation' to have two leading roles in dramas that rank among the Top 10 highest-rated series on CCTV.

=== 2012–2016: Beginnings ===
In 2012, Deng Lun was picked by Chiung Yao to star in the romance series Flowers in Fog. Deng Lun played opposite Yang Zi (Bai Menghua) as Xu Hao. The drama aired in 2013, marking his debut.

In 2014, Deng Lun was featured in the period drama Moment in Peking. He played the female lead Yao Mulan's younger brother Yao Afei.

In 2015, Deng Lun starred in the urban family comedy series Dad to be Married, in which he played the ideal and aspiring big boy Su Da, watching over his half-sister and helping her find true love. He also co-starred with Sun Yi in the urban sitcom Love Upper Lot, playing the role of Sun Xiaofei, a business administration graduate with a fair-looking, shy and unsociable character. In the same year, Deng Lun began filming for Promise of Migratory Birds and the historical mythical drama Investiture of the Gods, his first historical drama. He also worked on two more drama projects, Brotherhood in War and White Deer Plain.

In 2016, Deng Lun co-starred with Zhang Ruoyun and Sun Yi in Promise of Migratory Birds, an urban youth idol drama adapted from the novel of the same name, playing the second male lead Liu Qianren who is cold in appearance but warm in heart. Deng Lun also appeared in the urban drama Super Cinderella, playing the female lead Du Qihua's younger brother, Du Qitian. In the same year, Deng Lun filmed the urban drama Graduation Season with Krystal Jung. He also began working on three more new TV series, Because of Meeting You, Princess Agents and Ode to Joy 2. On December 10, Deng Lun won the ‘Trending Young Actor of the Year’ award at the 10th Tencent Video Star Awards for his performance in Promise of Migratory Birds.

=== 2017: Rising popularity ===
On March 2, the family series Because of Meeting You was premiered, with Deng Lun again starring with Sun Yi. The series’ ratings soared to No.1 throughout its broadcast, winning the national TV series concurrent viewership ratings with an average of 1.93% in 52 cities and an average of 3.26% on the national network, the highest ratings for a single episode exceeded 5%, and the number of online broadcasts surpassing the 7 billion mark. Because of Meeting You became the biggest dark horse of TV dramas in 2017. This drama set the record-ratings with an all-time series high.

On April 16, broadcast began for the critically acclaimed period drama White Deer Plain. Deng Lun gained recognition for his performance as the supporting role Lu Zhaohai, winning the Breakthrough Actor award at Weibo TV Drama Awards. He also won 2017's Popular Artist award at the 6th iQIYI Scream Night Awards Ceremony. On May 11, the metropolitan romance series Ode to Joy 2 began premiering. Deng Lun played Xie Tong, a rising musician in his early twenties opposite Qiao Xin. Deng Lun also contributed two singles to the series' soundtrack. On June 5, the historical action drama Princess Agents was premiered, with Deng starring opposite Zhao Liying. With an average audience rating of 1.741% and a market share of 10.84%, the drama was ranked as the champion of weekly dramas in 2017–2018.

Deng Lun continued working on new series. Blossom in Heart's filming began in February, Ashes of Love in June, and Sweet Dreams in October.

=== 2018: Breakthrough ===
In March, Deng Lun participated in Who's the Keyman, a 13-episode variety game show that challenged the players' strength in deductive reasoning. Deng Lun went on to win the season's 'Almighty Reasoning King' title. He is widely known to excel in logical reasoning.

In May, Deng Lun began filming for the TV series My True Friend alongside Angelababy. On June 25, the romance drama Sweet Dreams was premiered. Deng Lun starred as the male lead opposite Dilraba Dilmurat. The series' concurrent viewership ratings 'broke 1%', with an average of 1.018% in 52 cities. Sweet Dreams was one of the Top 20 highest rated dramas in 2018. The series reached 6 billion views before the drama wrapped its run. His romance drama Ashes of Love began premiering from August 2 – September 4, with Deng reuniting and co-starring with Yang Zi. Since the broadcast, the series' ratings climbed to No.1, the concurrent viewership ratings of 52 Cities 'broke 1.3%', and the highest view count for a single day was 41,208,066 views on September 2. The series reached 100 million views in just 15 minutes after the broadcast of the first episode. Ashes of Love became 2018 summer vacation's national ratings champion.

In October, Deng Lun began filming for the drama Mr. Fighting. In the same month, he filmed for the variety show Treasure in the Forbidden City, China's first cultural innovation reality show for The Palace Museum, serving as the host and The Forbidden City's Cultural and Creative New Product Development Officer. The show hit No.1 on TV premiere and dual smartphone networks, No.1 in the country for TV ratings, and No.1 in popularity on the entire network.

Deng Lun also contributed songs for Treasure in the Forbidden City, as well as Sweet Dreams and Ashes of Love series' soundtracks. Starring as the male lead in two 2018's highly rated TV series Sweet Dreams and Ashes of Love ushered in the peak of Deng Lun's acting career. Ashes of Love became a commercial success with high ratings and positive reviews both domestically and internationally. Deng Lun received widespread acclaim for his performance and experienced a surge in popularity.

=== 2019-2022: Mainstream popularity ===
On February 4, Deng Lun participated in CCTV New Year's Gala for the first time, he performed the song "I Strive in Happiness" next to William Chan and Jackie Chan. On March 30, Deng Lun appeared as a resident member in the escape room themed series Great Escape (China). Investiture of the Gods, the historical mystical drama filmed four years ago, finally received an airdate on April 8. Deng Lun was 23 when he played the role of the bewitching nine-tailed fox demon king Zi Xu. The series' concurrent viewership ratings 'broke 1%', with an average of 1.061% in 55 cities.

On May 19, My True Friend began premiering. The series' concurrent viewership ratings 'broke 1%', with an average of 1.093% in 55 cities. Deng Lun's performance in the heart-warming series earned him a nomination for 'Best Actor in a Leading Role' at the Asian Television Awards and 'Best Actor (Emerald Category)' at the 6th Actors of China Awards Ceremony; the series won 'Special Award for Overseas Drama' at the 13th Tokyo International TV Drama Festival. On July 31, Mr. Fighting began broadcast. Deng Lun starred in the leading role Hao ZeYu, an actor who tries hard to regain his fame alongside Ma Sichun. Deng Lun also contributed a single to the series' soundtrack. Since its broadcast, the series' real- time broadcast ratings 'broke 2%', and it became the national ratings champion.

On August 19, Deng Lun began filming for The Yin-Yang Master movie in Hengdian World Studios. On October 24, the period romance drama Blossom in Heart began premiering. Deng Lun played the main lead alongside Li Yitong. Blossom in Heart became the broadcast's platform's (MGTV) annual champion. Within the first 24 hours of airing, the viewership broke 200 million views. Deng Lun was the No.1 drama actor on Vlinkage New Media Index.

In mid-June 2020, Deng Lun participated in the anti-epidemic drama With You. Deng Lun played a leading role in one of the chapters titled I am Dalian. Deng Lun's episodes were aired on October 6, with ratings 'breaking 1%' on multiple networks.

On December 25, 2020, The Yin-Yang Master: Dream of Eternity film was screened nationwide in China, starring Deng Lun as warrior Boya and Mark Chao as Qingming. This was Deng Lun's first movie; his acting skills were well received by the public. The film was a box office success as it raked in a record of ¥452 million 10 days after its official theatrical release. Netflix acquired the international rights, and it was then launched in more than 190 countries and regions.

On December 28, 2020, Deng Lun's closing credits soundtrack titled Tomb of Infatuation for the movie The Yin-Yang Master: Dream of Eternity hit No.1 on QQ Music, KuGou Music, and DouYin. On January 5–6, 2021, the closing credits soundtrack also hit No.1 on the Asian New Songs Chart. The 'Asian New Songs Chart' is a list of new Asian popular/trending music jointly created by Ali Music, Sina Weibo, Sina Entertainment, and Youku Tudou. It also hit No.1 in Migu Music's first half of 2021 film OST ranking chart. Despite popular demand, he is unwilling to pursue singing as it detracts him from his acting career; for that, he is popularly known as 'a singer mistaken as an actor'.

On January 7, 2021, the period drama Brotherhood in War filmed in 2016 finally began broadcast on a domestic channel. Deng Lun played Ma ChuXi, the protagonist's adopted brother; he received praise for his acting skills and for accomplishing his complicated role brilliantly.

On July 20, 2021, Deng Lun began filming the drama Night Wanderer with co-star Ni Ni, marking Deng Lun's comeback drama after almost 3 years since 2019. The drama is adapted from the popular novel of the same name by author Zhao Xizhi.

On February 21, 2022, Deng Lun starred in Gucci Love Parade advertisement campaign, becoming the first Chinese artist to appear in Gucci's global ready-to-wear commercial, together with Beanie Feldstein, Jared Leto, Lee Jung-jae, Liu Wen, Miley Cyrus, and Snoop Dogg.

=== 2022-present: Career stoppage ===
On March 15, 2022, Deng Lun was fined US$16.6 million for tax evasion, for which he issued an apology on Weibo. His private and official social media accounts were subsequently closed. Thereafter, he shifted his focus to the hotpot business Fireroom, which he co-founded with childhood friend Guo Jiaxi in 2020. In January 2025, he was featured in Art PDF magazine as a faceless, nameless model.

== Endorsements ==
He has served as brand ambassador for brands like Bvlgari, L'Oreal, Ralph Lauren, Roger Vivier, and Bally. Within a year, he achieved the grand slam for the "Big 5" men's magazines in China with appearances in Harper's Bazaar Men, GQ, Elle Men, L'Officiel Hommes, and Esquire, another first for the "Post-90s Generation".

== Filmography ==
Year	English title	Chinese title	Role	Notes
2020	The Yin-Yang Master: Dream of Eternity	阴阳师:晴雅集	Bo Ya	(on Netflix)
TBA	The Yin-Yang Master: Retaliation	阴阳师:泷夜曲	Bo Ya	

== Television series (drama) ==
Year	English title	Chinese title	Role	Network	Notes
2013	Flowers in Fog	花非花雾非雾	Xu Hao	Hunan TV	
2014	Moment in Peking	新京华烟云	Yao A'fei	Shanghai TV	
2015	Dad to be Married	待嫁老爸	Su Da	Hubei TV	
2015	Sign Love / Love Actually / Love Upperlot	爱情上上签	Sun Xiaofei	Ningbo TV	
2016	Promise of Migratory Birds	十五年等待候鸟	Liu Qianren	Hunan TV	
2017	Magic Star	奇星记之鲜衣怒马少年时	Lord Youran	Youku	Cameo
2017	Because of Meeting You	因為遇見你	Li Yunkai	Hunan TV	
2017	White Deer Plain	白鹿原	Lu Zhaohai	Anhui TV, Jiangsu TV	
2017	Ode to Joy 2	欢乐颂2	Xie Tong	Dragon TV, Zhejiang TV	
2017	Princess Agents	特工皇妃楚乔传	Xiao Ce	Hunan TV	Special appearance
2018	Sweet Dreams	一千零一夜	Bo Hai	Hunan TV	
2018	Ashes of Love	香蜜沉沉烬如霜	Xu Feng	Jiangsu TV	(on Netflix)
2019	Investiture of the Gods	封神演义	Fox Demon King Zixu	Hunan TV	
2019	My True Friend	我的真朋友	Shao Pengcheng	Dragon TV, Zhejiang TV	
2019	Mr. Fighting	加油，你是最棒的	Hao Zeyu	Hunan TV	
2019	Blossom in Heart	海棠经雨胭脂透	Lang Yuexuan	Mango TV	
2020	Skate into Love	冰糖炖雪梨	Xu Feng	Jiangsu TV, Zhejiang TV	Cameo
2020	Together / With You: I Am Dalian	在一起: 我叫大连	Song Xiaoqiang	Dragon TV	
2021	Brotherhood in War / Loving the Earth	燃情大地 / 战火狼烟	Ma Chuxi	Shanxi TV	
2021	Faith Makes Great: Tianhe	理想照耀中国: 天河	Wu Zutai	Hunan TV	A special drama dedicated to the 100th Anniversary of the founding of the CCP
TBA	Super Cinderella	超级灰姑娘 / 叫我灰姑娘	Du QiTian	-	Filming completed in 2014
TBA	Graduation Season	毕业季	An Jingchen	Tencent Video	Filming completed on 2016
TBA	Night Wanderer	夜旅人	Sheng Qingrang	IQiyi	Filming completed on 13 November 2021

== Variety shows ==
Year	English title	Chinese title	Role	Notes
2017	King Cross/Crossover Singer Season 2	跨界歌王2	Contestant	Ep.9, 10, 12
2017	White Deer Plain Opening Ceremony on A Bright World	世界青年说 白鹿原 开播盛典	Cast member	13 April 2017
2017	Where Are We Going, Dad? Season 5	爸爸去哪儿第五季	Intern father	
2017	Ode to Joy2 Opening Concert	欢乐颂2 开播演唱会完整版	Performer	(duet with Qiao Xin) "Our Small World" (我们的小世界) and "Love What I Love" (爱我所爱)
2017	Hunan Satellite TV New Year's Eve Concert	2018湖南卫视跨年演唱会	Performer	31 December 2017 (solo) "Stable Happiness" (稳稳的幸福) and "Wings" (翅膀)
2018	Zhejiang Satellite TV Spring Festival	浙江卫视春季盛典	Performer	31 March 2018 (solo) "Tempting Heart" (心动) and "All About You" (全部都是你)
2018	Who's the Keyman	我是大侦探	Resident member	
2018	Super Penguin League Season 3	超级企鹅联盟S3	Contestant (’Brothers’ team captain)	Ep.4-6
2018	Shake It Up	新舞林大会	Contestant	Ep.6 (26 August 2018)
2018	The Letter	一封家书	Member	Ep.9
2018	Trust in China	信中国	Narrator	Ep.7
2018	Who's The Murderer Season 4	明星大侦探4	Member	Ep.3
2018	Revival Of The Palace Museum / Treasure in the Forbidden City	上新了·故宫	Host and The Forbidden City's Cultural and Creative New Product Development Officer	
2018	DragonTV New Year's Eve Concert	2019 东方跨年盛典 20181231	Performer	(solo) "Young and Promising" (年少有为)
2019	2019 CCTV Spring Festival Gala	2019央视春晚	Performer	(trios with Jackie Chan, Chen WeiTing) – "I Strive in Happiness" (我奋斗 我幸福)
2019	Great Escape Season 1	密室大逃脱1	Resident member	
2019	Game On	我要打篮球	'Flash' team captain	
2019	Jeremy Lin 3rd Annual All Star Game	林书豪明星赛	Contestant	10 August 2019
2019	Revival Of The Palace Museum / Treasure in the Forbidden City 2	上新了·故宫2	Host and The Forbidden City's Cultural and Creative New Product Development Officer	
2020	Go Fighting! Season 6	极限挑战6	Resident member	
2020	Super Show	618超级秀	Performer	(trios with Guo JingFei, Jia NaiLiang) - "The Younger Me" (少年), Go Fighting! Season 6 (group performance) - "Fighting Fighting Go"
2020	Go Fighting Treasure Tour: Three Districts and Three States Charity Season	极限挑战宝藏行·三区三州公益季	Resident member	Ep.4, 5
2020	Great Escape Season 2	密室大逃脱2	Resident member	
2020	Great Escape vs Sisters Who Make Waves	密室大逃脱 X 乘风破浪的姐姐	Resident member	Special episode
2020	Revival Of The Palace Museum / Treasure in the Forbidden City 3	上新了·故宫3	Host and The Forbidden City's Cultural and Creative New Product Development Officer	
2020	Dunk Of China Season 3	这！就是灌篮3	Manager	
2021	Go Fighting! Season 7	极限挑战7	Resident member	
2021	Great Escape Season 3	密室大逃脱3	Resident member	
2021	The Young The Flowering / 28-Year-Old You	28岁的你	Member	A special program dedicated to the 100th Anniversary of the founding of the CCP - Ep.1 (30 May 2021)
2021	Yangtze River Delta: Go Fighting Password	潮涌长三角: 小专题《极限密码》	Go Fighting resident member	A special program dedicated to the 100th Anniversary of the founding of the CCP (27 June 2021), Go Fighting! Season 7 (group performance) - adapted version of "Fighting Fighting Go"
2021	Great Journey: Breaking Dawn	中国共产党成立100周年文艺演出《伟大征程:破晓》	Performer	A theatrical performance to celebrate the 100th Anniversary of the founding of the CCP (七一晚会 1 July 2021)
2022	Who's the Murderer Season 7	明星大侦探7	Member	Ep.5-6

== Discography ==
Year	English title	Chinese title	Album	Ref./Notes
2017	"The Sky is Dark"	天已黑	Ode to Joy 2 OST	
2017	"Love What I Love"	爱我所爱	Ode to Joy 2 OST	
2018	"Flowers Stay Silent"	花不语	Sweet Dreams OST	
2018	"Unparalleled in the World"	天地无霜	Ashes of Love OST	Duet with Yang Zi
2018	"Unparalleled in the World"	天地无霜	Ashes of Love OST	Solo version
2018	"Revival Of The Palace Museum" / "Treasure in the Forbidden City"	上新了·故宫	Revival Of The Palace Museum / Treasure in the Forbidden City OST	
2019	"Youth Beijing"	青春北京		Project for 40th anniversary of economic reform
2019	"I Strive in Happiness"	我奋斗我幸福		Performance for CCTV Spring Gala
2019	"Suddenly I Wanna Love You "	突然想爱你	Mr. Fighting OST	
2019	"Waiting For Love"	等爱	Blossom in Heart OST	
2019	"Art of Astrology"	牵星术	Revival Of The Palace Museum / Treasure in the Forbidden City 2 OST	
2020	"Fighting Fighting Go"		Go Fighting S6	Go Fighting S6 Charity Theme Song
2020	"Great Escape"	密室大逃脱	Great Escape 2 Theme Song	
2020	"Zi Jin Qiu"	紫禁秋	Revival Of The Palace Museum / Treasure in the Forbidden City 3 OST	
2020	"Together / With You"	在一起	Together / With You	
2020	"Grave of Infatuation" / "Tomb of Infatuation"	痴情冢	The Yin-Yang Master: Dream of Eternity OST	
2021	"Fighting Fighting Go" (adapted version)	加油加油冲	Yangtze River Delta: Go Fighting Password	An adapted version of "Fighting Fighting Go" in the special program Yangtze River Delta: Go Fighting Password (潮涌长三角:极限密码) dedicated to the 100th Anniversary of the founding of the CCP

== Voice over ==
Year	English title	Chinese title	Role	Notes
2018	Revival Of The Palace Museum / Treasure in the Forbidden City Season 1: Emperor Shunzhi's Love Letter	上新了·故宫: 顺治御制董鄂后行状	Reciter	Deng Lun recites the love poem written by the Emperor Shunzhi to Concubine Dong E
2019	Autonavi Navigation (App) / Amap	高德地图 (App)	Deng Lun's voice navigation	Deng Lun provided road users with voice-guided GPS navigation under the app's celebrity voice navigation feature
2019	Behind The Mask Season 1	面具之下1	Case presenter / Lin Che (林彻)	Audio story (Ximalaya/Himalaya App) (喜马拉雅 App)
2019	’Coco‘ Disney Pixar animation	邓伦配音的寻梦环游记	Narrator	Deng Lun provided audio description for the visually impaired - a public welfare project: ‘Movie Dreams for the Visually Impaired’
2019	Zhu Shenghao's Love Letter	朗诵朱生豪的情书	Reciter	Deng Lun recites a love letter written by Zhu Shenghao to his lover
2020	Behind The Mask Season 2	面具之下2	Case presenter / Lin Che (林彻)	Audio story (Ximalaya/Himalaya App) (喜马拉雅 App)
2020	Deng Lun x Dear Basketball x Kobe	邓伦x亲爱的篮球x科比	Reciter	Deng Lun recites 'Dear Basketball' to pay respect to his idol Kobe Bryant
2021	China - Guanlong	纪录片: 中国 之 关陇 (中国群星配音版 ·邓伦)	Narrator	China's various artists dubbing edition – Deng Lun narrates the story of Yuwentai Suchuo, who worked together to innovate and lead the Guanlong Group to revitalize the Western Wei Dynasty

== Awards and nominations ==
Year	Event	Category	Category in Chinese	Nominated work	Result	Notes
2016	10th Tencent Video Star Awards	Trending Young Actor	年度青春大势艺人奖	Promise of Migratory Birds	Won	
2017	Weibo TV Drama Awards	Breakthrough Actor	年度突破艺人奖	White Deer Plain	Won	
2017	14th Esquire Man At His Best Awards	Most Promising Actor	年度最具潜力演员奖	—N/a	Won	
2017	6th iQIYI Scream Night Awards Ceremony	Popular Artist Award	年度人气艺人	—N/a	Won	
2018	9th China TV Drama Awards	2017 Rising Actor	年度新晋男演员	—N/a	Won	
2018	3rd China Quality TV Drama Awards	Charismatic Young Drama Actor	年度青春号召力剧星	Because of Meeting You	Won	
2018	24th Huading Awards	Best Actor (Ancient Drama)	中国古代题材电视剧最佳男演员奖	Ashes of Love	Nominated	
2018	7th iQIYI Scream Night Awards Ceremony	Popular Drama Actor	年度戏剧人气艺人	Ashes of Love	Won	
2018	15th Esquire Man At His Best Awards (MAHB)	TV Drama Actor	年度电视剧演员	—N/a	Won	
2018	12th Tencent Video Starlight Awards	Popular TV Drama Actor in a Leading Role	年度人气电视剧男主角	—N/a	Won	
2018	Sohu Fashion Awards	China TV Drama Male Star	年度国剧男明星	—N/a	Won	
2019	Weibo Awards Ceremony	Weibo Popular Artist	微博年度人气艺人	—N/a	Won	
2019	GQ Men of the Year Awards 2019	GQ Goodwill Ambassador	智族GQ公益大使	—N/a	Won	
2019	6th The Actors of China Awards Ceremony	Best Actor (Emerald Category)	好演员	My True Friend	Nominated	
2019	24th Asian Television Awards	Best Actor in a Leading Role	最佳男主角	My True Friend	Nominated	
2019	Golden Bud - The Fourth Network Film And Television Festival	Best Actor	最佳男演员	My True Friend, Mr. Fighting, Blossom in Heart	Nominated	
2020	7th The Actors of China Awards Ceremony	Best Actor (Emerald)	好演员	—N/a	Nominated	
2020	GQ Men of the Year Awards 2020	Motivated Artist	年度向上力量	—N/a	Won	
2020	17th Esquire Man At His Best Awards (MAHB)	Most Commercially Valuable Artist of the Year	年度最具商业价值艺人	—N/a	Won	
2021	GQ Men of the Year Awards 2021	Zhizu GQ Annual Role Model	智族GQmoty年度人物	—N/a	Won	
2022	Esquire's 25th Anniversary Gentle Gala	Mr. of the Year/Man at His Best	先生之夜幻境星空	—N/a	Won	
2022	7th Global Diplomat Chinese Culture Night	Most Popular Actor of the Year	届全球外交官中国文化之夜“最受欢迎男演员	—N/a	Won	

== Honors and recognition ==
Year	Honors and recognition	Notes
2017	CBN Weekly "2017 China's Most Commercially Valuable Star Ranking TOP100" (ranked #51)	
2018	Forbes China's 30 under 30 for Chinese Entertainment	
2019	Forbes China Celebrity 100 list (ranked #21)	
2019	TCCAsia 100 Most Handsome Faces in Asia 2019 (ranked #5)	
2020	Forbes China Celebrity 100 list (ranked #34)	
2020	Wax figure, Madame Tussauds Shanghai	
2020	TCCAsia 100 Most Handsome Faces in Asia 2020 (ranked #54)	

== Endorsements and business cooperation ==
Year	Brand name in English (in Chinese)	Title / Role	Notes
2017	Make Up For Ever (玫珂菲)	Spokesperson in China	
2017	MEIFUBAO (美膚寶)	Brand spokesperson	
2017	TJOY (丁家宜)	Brand spokesperson	
2017	(酪藝芝士)	Brand spokesperson	
2017	(風田集成灶)	Brand spokesperson	
2017	LG (竹鹽)	Spokesperson in China	
2018	Avon (雅芳 小黑裙)	Fragrance officer	
2018	Gichancy (姬存希)	Skin care spokesperson	
2018	Leader (統帥電器)	Light fashion spokesperson	
2018	Jack&Jones (杰克琼斯)	Spokesperson in Greater China	
2018	Baidu (百度) APP	Super explorer spokesperson	
2019	Deluxe Milk (特仑苏)	Brand spokesperson	
2019	Bally (巴丽)	Brand spokesperson in Asia Pacific	
2019	Adidas (阿迪达斯)	Brand spokesperson	
2019	Biotherm (碧欧泉)	Brand spokesperson	
2019	Joyoung (九陽)	Brand spokesperson	
2019	Only Photo (唯一旅拍)	Brand spokesperson	
2019	Jin Zai little fish (勁仔小魚)	Brand spokesperson	
2019	LLidezi facial mask (麗得姿面膜)	Image spokesperson for Asia Pacific	
2019	Beijing Run Technology Co. Ltd. (小猪短租)	Product spokesperson	
2019	Rio (鸡尾酒)	Product spokesperson	
2019	Lock & Lock (樂扣樂扣)	Brand spokesperson	
2019	Meco (蜜谷果汁茶)	Brand spokesperson	
2019	Himalaya (喜馬拉雅)	VIP spokesperson	
2019	Helen Keller (海倫凱勒眼鏡)	Brand spokesperson	
2019	QQ	Chief Entertainment Officer	
2020	L'Oréal Paris (巴黎欧萊雅)	Sunshine spokesperson	
2020	Pepsi (百事可樂)	Osmanthus flavor spokesperson	
2020	FOREO	Global brand spokesperson	
2020	Acqua Panna (普娜)	Brand spokesperson	
2020	Voolga (敷尔佳)	Face mask spokesperson	
2020	Teway Food seasoning (好人家调味)	Brand spokesperson	
2020	Cainiao Guoguo (菜鸟裹裹)	Brand spokesperson	
2020	Corona beer (科罗娜)	Brand spokesperson	
2020	BVLGARI (寶格麗)	Brand spokesperson in China	
2020	L'Oréal Paris (巴黎歐萊雅)	Makeup spokesperson	
2020	Ralph Lauren (拉夫劳伦)	Perfume brand spokesperson in China	
2020	Junlebao Yogurt (君乐宝简醇)	Brand spokesperson	
2021	Roger Vivier (罗杰维维亚)	Brand spokesperson	
2021	Suofeiya Home Collection (索菲亚)	Global brand spokesperson	
2021	Naris Parasola Sunscreen (娜丽丝)	Brand spokesperson	
2021	Quaker (桂格燕麦)	Brand spokesperson	
2021	CLEAR Clean & Fresh (清扬)	Spokesperson	
2021	Unilever (联合利华)	Spokesperson	
2021	Sulwhasoo (雪花秀)	Asia Pacific regional brand spokesperson	
2021	BABO (斑布)	Brand spokesperson	
2021	Viomi (云米)	Global brand spokesperson	
2022	Jiujiuya (久久丫)	Brand spokesperson	
2022	Life-Space (益生菌)	Spokesperson for selected products	
2022	Moccona (摩可纳咖啡)	Brand spokesperson	
