= Love Will Tear Us Apart (2013 film) =

- Directed by: Li Weiran
- Starring: Feng Shaofeng; Ni Ni
- Production company: Le Vision Pictures
- Release date: October 12, 2013
- Country: China
- Language: Mandarin
- Box office: $13,690,000

Love Will Tear Us Apart (Chinese: 我想和你好好的) is a 2013 Chinese film directed by Li Weiran and starring Feng Shaofeng and Ni Ni.

== Synopsis ==
A simple but heartbreaking love story. An ordinary copy director Liang Liang falls in love with a beautiful model Miao Miao. They strongly attract each other, but Miao Miao's insecurity in relationships gradually tears them apart.

== Cast ==
- Feng Shaofeng as Jiang Liangliang
- Ni Ni as Miaomiao

== Reception ==
- Love will tear us apart is rated 5.8 on Douban, a widely used social networking website in China, and receives a mixed reaction among audience. Only 29% users give positive credits and 32% provide negative ones. A number of viewers regard the protagonists' interactions as overly exaggerated, but there's also a major contradictory perspective, with which the audience suggest that this film reflects their own relationships in a truthful way.
- Derek Elley from Film Asia Business gives 8 out of 10 to Love will tear us apart . He calls the film "a combination of terrific lead chemistry, a deftly constructed script full of flavoursome dialogue, and the whole package’s technical smoothness elevates the movie."
