= Sweet Dreams (TV series) =

2018 Chinese television series

- Promotional poster

Chinese name
- Simplified Chinese: 一千零一夜
Transcriptions
Standard Mandarin
- Hanyu Pinyin: yī qiān líng yī yè
- Genre: Romance comedy Science fiction
- Directed by: Jin Sha
- Starring: Dilraba Dilmurat; Deng Lun
- Country of origin: China
- Original language: Mandarin
- No. of seasons: 1
- No. of episodes: 48

Production
- Production locations: Hangzhou; France
- Production companies: Mandala Media; Jay Walk Studio; Astro Entertainment

Original release
- Network: Hunan Television
- Release: June 25 – July 23, 2018

Sweet Dreams (Chinese: 一千零一夜; pinyin: yī qiān líng yī yè) is a 2018 Chinese television series starring Dilraba Dilmurat and Deng Lun. The series premiered on June 25, 2018 on Hunan TV. The series has reached 6 billion views before the drama wrapped its run. and also received positive reviews for its unique story setting, fresh perspective on the occupation of floriculture and humorous "variety" sense.

== Synopsis ==
Ling Ling Qi, a kind-hearted girl, has a crush on renowned florist, Bo Hai. Determined to get closer to him, she applies for work at his company, Flower Plus. One day, they come across bracelets designed to promote better sleep by controlling brain waves. When they try them on, the devices malfunction and merge Ling Ling Qi’s brain waves with Bo Hai’s. Thus, Ling Ling Qi is transported into all of Bo Hai’s dreams where she helps him overcome some of his childhood traumas.

== Cast ==
=== Main ===
- Dilraba Dilmurat as Ling Ling Qi
  - An ordinary girl who is kind and helpful. She is Bo Hai's diehard fangirl. However, her low IQ and self-esteem has affected her life, hindering her career and preventing her from achieving her dreams. Although she has studied to be a veterinarian, she applied to Flower Plus three times (once per year) just so she could be with her idol. Despite Zhou Xin Yan's sabotage on her third try, she manages to get into Flower Plus as a salesperson instead of a florist. She later finds out that Bo Hai has a different personality and not like the one in her dreams. However, they manage to get closer after Ling Ling Qi discovers his secret. After she helps him through one of Wen Guang Qi's schemes and displays her skills at flower arrangement, she was promoted to a florist. She later betrays Bo Hai because she thought the betrayal would save him and his company from Liu Ying Jie/William and Mo Nan's schemes.
- Deng Lun as Bo Hai
  - A florist, and President of Flower Plus company. He has high IQ but low EQ. He has pyrophobia after being traumatized by a fire in his childhood, which also causes his temporary colorblindness. He was able to finally overcome this weakness with the help of Ling Ling Qi.

=== Supporting ===
- Chen Yilong as Mo Nan
  - He works at Flower Plus as a spy to get revenge on Bo Hai for his father's death. He finds out that it was Liu Ying Jie/William who actually killed his father and that he was blaming the wrong person the whole time. He later works with Bo Hai to bring down Liu Ying Jie/William. He has a crush on Ling Ling Qi.
- Zhu Xudan as Zhou Xin Yan
  - Marketing director of Flower Plus. In the beginning of the series, she has a big crush on Bo Hai. She uses every means possible to get rid of Ling Ling Qi as she sees her as a threat, but fails to do so every time because Bo Hai was making sure Ling Ling Qi stays by his side. Later on, she lets go of Bo Hai and accepts Chen Mo's feelings. After becoming Chen Mo's girlfriend, her personality did a 180 change, from accepting Ling Ling Qi to becoming more social with the Flower Plus' employees.
- Zhang Haowei as Chen Mo
  - Bo Hai's secretary and close friend. He has feelings for Zhou Xin Yan and never fails to comfort her when she's feeling down by supplying her with her favorite lollipops. While trying to woo Xin Yan, he and Ling Ling Qi become closer.
- Wang Ruizi as Lu Bao Ni
  - Ling Ling Qi's close friend. Human Resources manager of Flower Plus. She has a secret crush Mo Nan.
- Qu Gaowei as Wen Guangqi
  - Vice president of Flower Plus. Bo Hai's opponent. Liu Ying Jie/William's initial pawn in Flower Plus before Mo Nan exposed him.
- Wang Bingxiang as Shi Ji
  - Wen Guangqi's assistant. Was sacrificed as the "spy" so Mo Nan's identity would not be exposed.
- Zhang Junming as Lv Dawei
  - Employee of Flower Plus. Lu Bao Ni's admirer.
- Ming Ziyu as Zhen Qi
  - Employee of Flower Plus. A Bo Hai fangirl.
- Xu Zixuan as Lu Sisi
  - Employee of Flower Plus.
- Huang Wen as Zhang Lili
- Dong Ziheng as Xin Ba
- Fu Jia as Ling Guoliang
  - Ling Ling Qi's father. He is very a stingy but caring parent.
- Yang Kun as Song Ling Ling
  - Ling Ling Qi's mother. She participates in the community dances and likes to compete with Li Li Jun. Constantly gossips about her daughter's love life.
- Tse Kwan-ho as Liu Ying Jie/William
  - Mo Nan's aka second father and corporate spy. Formerly the financial manager of Yunhe Floriculture. He wanted revenge on Mo Nan and Bo Hai because he blamed their parents, Yin Chang He (Mo Nan's dad) and Lu Yun Qing (Bo Hai's mom) for not giving him the money to get treatment for his five-year-old son's leukemia. He had killed Yin Chang He in the office and set a fire in Bo Hai's home (cause of Lu Yun Qing's death and Bo Hai's pyrophobia). He then took Mo Nan and raised him as his pawn for him to one day get rid of Bo Hai (his reasoning was that because his own son died, so Yin Chang He and Lu Yun Qing's sons must also die). In the end, he was found not guilty of his prior crimes but was sentenced for intentional manslaughter.
- Lu Xingyu as Li Boqing
- Liu Qiushi as Ji Bin
  - Mo Nan's right hand man. He was caught by William's men as he was asked by Mo Nan to find out the truth about William, but he later escaped.
- Gao Mingyang as Wu Fan
  - Liu Ying Jie/Williams' secretary.
- Li Jinyang as Ma Xiaoyi
- Gao Hai as Luo Xian'nian
- Du Yafei as Wang Jianming
- Teng Xuan as Lu Yun Qing
  - Bo Hai's mom. Died in the fire that was caused by Liu Ying Jie/William.
- Yang Lei as Xiao Fang

== Soundtrack ==
No.	Title	Lyrics	Music	Singers	Length
1.	"One Thousand and One Nights (一千零一夜)" (Opening theme song)	Yang Zhe	Tian Changye, Cui Dukuan, Jin Zaixun	Liu Meilin
2.	"Love Shines the Brightest (爱最闪耀)"	Yang Zhe	Tian Changye, Liu Yuanguang	Xu Xinwen
3.	"Night Dream (白夜梦)"	Yang Zhe	Tian Changye, An Xiuwan	Chen Yilong
4.	"Flowers Stay Silent (花不语)" (Ending theme song)	Yang Zhe	Tian Changye, An Xiuwan	Deng Lun

== Ratings ==
- Highest ratings are marked in red, lowest ratings are marked in blue

Hunan TV ratings		CSM52 city ratings			National Internet ratings		
Air date	Episode #	Ratings (%)	Audience share (%)	Rank	Ratings (%)	Audience share (%)	Rank
2018.6.25	1-2	0.814	3.083	4	1.29	5.15	1
2018.6.26	3-4	0.732	2.854	5	1.26	5.08	1
2018.6.27	5-6	0.837	3.268	4	1.25	5.20	1
2018.6.28	7-8	1.013	3.901	1	1.40	5.75	1
2018.6.29	9	0.591	2.482	4	0.67	3.25	1
2018.6.30	10	0.700	2.849	4	0.79	3.67	1
2018.7.01	11-12	1.000	3.774	3	1.31	5.39	1
2018.7.02	13-14	1.089	4.137	1	1.56	6.21	1
2018.7.03	15-16	1.123	4.248	1	1.70	6.69	1
2018.7.04	17-18	1.274	4.813	1	2.05	8.04	1
2018.7.05	19-20	1.245	4.679	2	2.00	7.89	1
2018.7.06	21	0.572	2.342	4	0.93	4.18	1
2018.7.07	22	0.679	2.640	4	1.33	5.81	1
2018.7.08	23-24	1.023	3.741	2	1.79	7.05	1
2018.7.09	25-26	1.317	4.838	2	2.03	7.74	1
2018.7.10	27-28	1.253	4.650	2	2.00	7.79	1
2018.7.11	29-30	1.325	4.833	2	2.21	8.37	1
2018.7.12	31-32	1.130	4.218	2	1.993	7.834	1
2018.7.13	33	0.585	2.33	5	1.106	4.982	1
2018.7.14	34	0.605	2.46	5	1.253	5.733	1
2018.7.15	35-36	1.011	3.71	4	1.92	7.538	1
2018.7.16	37-38	1.175	4.422	2	2.151	8.359	1
2018.7.17	39-40	1.094	4.153	2	1.975	7.729	1
2018.7.18	41-42	1.141	4.284	1	1.921	7.666	1
2018.7.19	43-44	1.107	4.203	3	2.079	8.237	1
2018.7.20	45	0.56	2.411	5	0.778	3.95	1
2018.7.21	46	0.616	2.574	5	1.292	6.128	1
2018.7.22	47-48	0.995	3.73	4	1.866	7.605	1
2018.7.23	49	1.067	3.85	3	2.107	8.47	1

== International broadcast ==
Network(s)/Station(s)	Series premiere	Airing dates	Title	
China	Hunan Television (225)	June 25, 2018 – July 23, 2018 (Monday to Thursday 20:00-22:00 (two episodes broadcast); Friday and Saturday 19:30-20:20 (only one episode will be broadcast); Sunday 19:30-22:00 (two episodes broadcast))	一千零一夜 (電視劇) ( ; lit: )	
China	Tencent Video; Youku	June 25, 2018 – July 23, 2018 (Monday to Thursday 20:00-22:00 (two episodes broadcast); Friday and Saturday 19:30-20:20 (only one episode will be broadcast); Sunday 19:30-22:00 (two episodes broadcast))	Synchronous update every night at 24:00	一千零一夜 (電視劇) ( ; lit: )
China	Shenzhen TV	February 23, 2019	Every night from 19:35-21:10 (two episodes are broadcast)	一千零一夜 (電視劇) ( ; lit: )
China	China Hubei TV	March 3, 2019	Every night from 19:35-21:10 (two episodes are broadcast)	一千零一夜 (電視劇) ( ; lit: )
Malaysia	dimsum	June 26, 2018 – (Monday to Friday 20:00 (update two episodes); Saturday and Sunday 20:00 (updated episode))	Sweet Dreams (TV series) ( ; lit: )	
Taiwan	CHOCO TV	July 2, 2018 – (Monday to Thursday, Sunday 12:00 (updated two episodes); Friday, Saturday 12:00 (updated episode))	一千零一夜 (電視劇) ( ; lit: )	
Taiwan	LiTV	August 1, 2018 – ()	一千零一夜 (電視劇) ( ; lit: )	
Singapore	Hub E City	September 30, 2018 – (Sunday 22:00-00:00 (two episodes broadcast))	Sweet Dreams (TV series) ( ; lit: )	
Malaysia	8TV	December 23, 2018 – (Sunday 15:00-17:00 (two episodes broadcast))	Sweet Dreams (TV series) ( ; lit: )	
Hong Kong	MyTV Super	, 2018 – ()	一千零一夜 (電視劇) ( ; lit: )	
Hong Kong	TVB J2	January 18, 2019 – (Monday to Friday 18:00-19:00)	一千零一夜 (電視劇) ( ; lit: )	
Taiwan	CTi Entertainment	November 20, 2019 – (Monday to Friday 18:00-19:00)	一千零一夜 (電視劇) ( ; lit: )	
Thailand	Channel 9 MCOT HD (30)	November 12, 2019 - March 9, 2020 February (Every Monday, Tuesday, Wednesday from 23.05 - 00.00)	ฝันนี้ที่มีเธอ ( ; lit: )	
