= Up in the Wind =

- Directed by: Teng Huatao
- Screenplay by: Bao Jing Jing
- Produced by: Teng Huatao, Hao Wei, Chen Rong
- Starring: Ni Ni; Jing Boran
- Production company: Perfect World Pictures
- Distributed by: Perfect World Pictures
- Release date: December 31, 2013
- Running time: 107 minutes
- Country: China
- Language: Mandarin
- Box office: $11,780,000

Up in the Wind (Chinese: 等风来) is a 2013 Chinese road movie directed by Teng Huatao and starring Ni Ni and Jing Boran.

== Plot ==
The movie features a female journalist from a big Shanghai magazine, forced to go to Nepal to write an article about traveling in Nepal. The main part of the movie has been shot in Kathmandu, Chitwan and Pokhara.

== Cast ==
- Ni Ni
- Jing Boran
- Zhang Zixuan

== Reception ==
As of January 12, the film has grossed $11.78 million at the box office.
