= Flowers in Fog =

2013 Chinese television series

- Promotional Poster
- Genre: Romance; Drama
- Written by: Chiung Yao
- Directed by: Ding Yang Guo; Li Ping
- Starring: Li Sheng; Zhang Rui; Ruby Lin; Joo Jin-mo; Wan Qian; Yao Yuanhao; Yang Zi; Deng Lun; Gao Zi Qi
- Country of origin: China
- Original language: Mandarin
- No. of episodes: 54

Original release
- Network: Hunan TV
- Release: 6 August – 28 August 2013

Flowers in Fog (Chinese: 花非花雾非雾) is a 2013 Chinese television series written by Taiwanese novelist Chiung Yao. It is Chiung's first original screenplay after My Fair Princess (1998). The series was partially shot in Brittany, France. Starring an ensemble cast from China, Taiwan and South Korea, the series premiered on 6 August 2013 on Hunan TV.

== Synopsis ==
Xue Hua, Lang Hua, Huo Hua and Yan Hua are four orphans who grew up together at the Hua Xin Orphan Center. Each girl possessed outstanding musical talent and the sisters shared a tight bond. However, when Xue Hua was 15, she was found by her aunt who took her to France. Huo Hua is also adopted by a family. From then on, Lang Hua and Yan Hua promised each other to never be separated.

Sixteen years later, Huo Hua (now called Ye Fan), heads to France to search for Xue Hua. There, she falls in love with Qi Fei, a handsome and talented cello player. However, Huo Hua later finds out that Xue Hua was suspected to be dead and the prime suspect was none other than her boyfriend Qi Yuan, also the brother of Qi Fei. She thus tries to find out the truth about Xue Hua and began to seek revenge.

Meanwhile, Lang Hua (now called Bai Hai Hua) becomes a special nurse at the Geng's family special nursing center. There, she meets Geng Ke Yi and his son, Geng Ruo Chen. While helping take care of old Mr Geng, Lang Hua also helps father and son to mend their estranged relationship. In the process, she falls in love with Ruo Chen.

Yan Hua (now known as Bai Meng Hua), who has been protected by her elder sister Hai Hua since young, has a cheerful and attractive personality. She is being pursued by her colleagues, Xu Hao and Han Li at the same time; leading to interesting anecdotes.

== Cast ==
- Li Sheng as Ye Fan (Huo Hua)
- Zhang Rui as Qi Fei
- Ruby Lin as Xue Hua
  - Guan Xiaotong as young Xue Hua
- Joo Jin-mo as Qi Yuan
- Wan Qian as Bai Hai Hua (Lang Hua)
- Yao Yuanhao as Geng Ruo Chen
- Yang Zi as Bai Meng Hua (Yan Hua)
- Deng Lun as Xu Hao
- Gao Zi Qi as Han Li
- Liu De Kai as Geng Ke Yi
- Madina Memet as Beth
- Han Cheng Yu as An Ting Wei
- Fang Qing Zhuo as Xu Ma Ma
- Zhang Ying as Du Qiu Shui
- Song Zi Qiao as Ji Ai Xia
- Zhao Wei as Geng Pei Zhong
- Xiong Xiao Wen as Zhou Wen Juan
- Dai Yan Ni as Qin En

== Soundtrack ==
Flowers in Fog - Original Television Soundtrack (花非花雾非雾电视剧原声音乐大碟)
No.	Title	Music	Length
1.	"Flowers in Fog (花非花雾非雾)"	Zhang Rui
2.	"Locking the Romance (锁住浪漫)"	Zhang Rui
3.	"Beautiful Spring (美丽的春天)"	Zhang Rui
4.	"Allow Me to Love You (允许我爱你)"	Zhang Rui
5.	"Like (喜欢)"	Liu Xijun
6.	"Loving You for Eternal (爱在天长地久)"	Zhang Rui & Liu Xijun
7.	"Hating Myself For Loving You (恨我爱你)"	Zhang Rui
8.	"Unrestrained Youth (挥洒青春)"	Zhang Rui
9.	"Little Flower in the Fog (雾里的小花)"	Xu Yina
10.	"Rose in the Rain (雨中的红玫瑰)"	Zhang Rui
11.	"The Town of My Childhood (童年小镇)"	Zhang Rui
12.	"Withered Leaf Butterfly (枯叶蝶)"	Xu Yina
13.	"Missed (错过)"	Li Sheng
14.	"Flowers May Not Be Flowers (花非花)"	Li Sheng
15.	"Capability (本事)"	Xu Yina

== Ratings ==
- Highest ratings are marked in red, lowest ratings are marked in blue

Date	Episode	National Internet ratings			CSM46 city ratings		
Date	Episode	Ratings	Ratings share	Rank	Ratings	Ratings share	Rank
August 6	1-3	3.43	10.71	2	1.816	5.13	1
August 7	4-6	3.53	10.73	2	1.712	4.64	2
August 8	7-9	2.71	8.72	1	1.327	3.81	1
August 9	10	2.47	8.18	1	1.097	3.46	1
August 10	11	-	-	-	1.134	3.48	1
August 11	12-14	-	-	-	1.233	3.40	1
August 12	15-17	2.49	7.76	1	1.168	3.28	1
August 13	18-20	2.79	8.67	1	1.354	3.82	1
August 14	21-23	3.25	10.16	1	1.611	4.46	1
August 15	24-26	3.40	10.60	1	1.708	4.79	1
August 16	27	3.23	10.55	1	1.404	4.13	1
August 17	28	-	-	-	1.276	3.89	1
August 18	29-31	-	-	-	1.672	4.78	1
August 19	32-34	3.39	10.42	1	1.752	4.89	1
August 20	35-37	3.45	10.41	1	1.698	4.67	1
August 21	38-40	3.42	10.06	1	1.649	4.48	1
August 22	41-43	3.78	11.21	1	1.736	4.75	1
August 23	44	3.36	10.01	1	1.449	4.28	1
August 24	45	-	-	-	1.407	4.11	1
August 25	46-48	-	-	-	1.905	5.11	1
August 26	49-51	3.76	11.44	1	1.928	5.37	1
August 27	52-53	3.79	11.02	1	1.761	4.85	1
August 28	54	3.11	10.03	1	1.774	5.10	1
Average		3.25	10.04	4th (2013)	1.59	4.37	Ranked 7th in 2013

== International broadcasting ==
- Vietnam - The series premiered on July 18, 2025, on VTV3 as Hoa trong sương.
