= Night Wanderer =

Chinese television series

- Also known as: Ye Lü Ren
- Chinese: 夜旅人
- Genre: Time travel; Historical drama; Romance
- Based on: "Ye Lü Ren" (夜旅人) by Zhao Xizhi
- Directed by: Wan Liyang
- Starring: Deng Lun; Ni Ni
- Country of origin: China
- Original language: Mandarin
- No. of seasons: 1
- No. of episodes: 36 episodes

Production
- Producer: Zhang Jialu
- Production location: Hengdian World Studios
- Running time: 45 minutes per episode
- Production companies: iQIYI, Yongle Film & Television Production, Magic Reflection Box

Original release
- Network: iQIYI

Night Wanderer (Chinese: 夜旅人; pinyin: Ye Lü Ren) is an upcoming Chinese streaming television series co-produced by iQIYI, Yongle Film & Television Production, and Magic Reflection Box, directed by Wan Liyang, adapted from the popular time-travel themed novel "Ye Lü Ren" (夜旅人) by Zhao Xizhi. It stars Deng Lun and Ni Ni as the main leads. The series is set to be premiered on iQIYI with 36 episodes.

== Synopsis ==
It tells the love story between a medical examiner and a Republican-era lawyer. The time and space of 2021 and 1937 are staggered in an old apartment building No. 699 in Shanghai in which the two traverses between the intriguing world of Republican Shanghai and modern era.

== Cast ==
- Deng Lun as Sheng Qingrang
- Ni Ni as Zong Ying
- Wang Yuwen as Sheng Qinghui
- Wang Duo as Yin Ximeng
- Gao Ye as Xue Xuanqing
- Liu Runnan as Rong Qiang
- Yang Shize as Sheng Qiushi
- Chen Xijun as Sheng Qinghe
- Jampa Tseten as Xiao Dingjun
- Wang Yuanke as Sheng Qingping
- Wang Dong as Sheng Qingxiang

== Production ==
On 19 July 2021, the main leads were announced. The opening ceremony was held on July 20. The series was filmed in Hengdian World Studios. On October 15, the drama released a trailer for the iQIYI iJoy Conference. The series wrapped up on November 13 and released its first official trailer and a set of posters from the cast on November 14.

== Other media ==
As of 2025, a Korean adaptation of the novel the series is based on, "Ye Lü Ren" (夜旅人) by Zhao Xizhi, is in production with a screenplay by Yoon Ji-ryun, who penned Move to Heaven (2021). It was announced in May 2025 that Park Bo-gum had been offered the male lead role in Night Traveler. In April 2026, Shin Ye-eun was reportedly considering the female lead role, and production is expected to proceed rapidly once finalized.
