= Suddenly Seventeen =

- Poster
- 28岁未成年
- Directed by: Zhang Mo
- Screenplay by: Zhang Mo; Zhang Hongyi; Zhang Ying; Di Du; Tian Jin; Yin Wei; Wu Yushi
- Produced by: Zhang Yimou; Liu Jun; Yu Liang
- Starring: Ni Ni; Wallace Huo; Ma Su; Darren Wang
- Cinematography: Jeffrey Chli
- Edited by: Zhang Mo; Dai Zong
- Music by: Christopher Tin
- Production company: Le Vision Pictures
- Distributed by: Le Vision Pictures
- Release date: 9 December 2016 (China)
- Running time: 107 minutes
- Country: China
- Language: Mandarin
- Budget: CN¥111.6 million

Suddenly Seventeen (Chinese: 28岁未成年) is a 2016 Chinese fantasy romance drama film starring Ni Ni, Wallace Huo and Darren Wang. It is the directorial debut of Zhang Mo, Zhang Yimou's daughter. It was released in China by Le Vision Pictures on December 9, 2016.

== Plot ==
28-year-old Liang Xia (Ni Ni) and 34-year-old Mao Liang (Wallace Huo) have been together for nearly 10 years and living together in Beijing for the past five. Liang Xia has given up a promising career as a talented painter to be a perfect, attentive girlfriend for her "Prince Charming," who she assumes will propose to her soon, but she is constantly disappointed as Mao prioritizes his work at a design agency over her. While morosely watching TV one morning, Liang sees an infomercial for "magic" chocolates that purport to grant youthful energy, and orders a box on a whim.

Liang consults her best friend Bai Xiaoning, and the two of them concoct a plan to publicly pressure Mao into proposing to Liang at Bai's wedding. However, the plan backfires, and Mao threatens to break up with her instead. The heartbroken Liang eats one of the chocolates and becomes disoriented while driving, rear-ending the car in front of her. When she regains consciousness several seconds later, her mind, memories, and personality have been replaced by those of her 17-year-old self, who is perplexed to find herself 11 years in the future. 17-year-old Liang ("Little Liang") goes out and parties with Bai (who marvels at Liang's transformation but is supportive), but her mind eventually reverts to 28-year-old Liang ("Big Liang").

Big Liang and Bai, theorizing that it was the car crash that triggered the transformation, bribe a taxi driver to rapidly accelerate and decelerate, but are caught and detained by police. While waiting for Mao to pick her up from the police station, Liang glumly eats another chocolate, inadvertently transforming once again into Little Liang. Little Liang leaves Mao at the police station and hops on the subway, where she encounters a young man named Yan Yan (Darren Wang). She surreptitiously sketches a portrait of Yan, but reverts to Old Liang just as she finishes the sketch and drops the sketchbook, which is picked up by Yan.

Mao presents his latest designs to his boss, Mr. Gao, who is unimpressed. Mr. Gao shows Mao the top trending Weibo post that day - a photo of Little Liang on the subway and her impromptu sketch of Yan, which had been posted by Yan in hopes of tracking her down. Mr. Gao is impressed by Liang's sketch and wants Mao to bring her in to design for them, while Mao is shocked to see Liang taking up artistic pursuits once again.

The two Liang personas realize that the chocolates actually are magical and that each time Big Liang eats one, Little Liang replaces her in their shared body for precisely five hours, at which time Big Liang takes back control. The two Liangs begin communicating with each other using recorded videos and WeChat voice messages, but their personalities and priorities begin to clash. Mao asks Big Liang to design for him and Mr. Gao, and Big Liang is initially reluctant, but agrees out of jealousy towards what appears to be a budding relationship between Mao and his assistant, Xiao Yu.

Much to her chagrin, Big Liang realizes that her artistic abilities have severely regressed after 11 years out of practice and is forced to summon Little Liang by eating another chocolate, instructing her via voice message to draw designs on her behalf. The naive and free-spirited Little Liang, however, is delighted to discover that Yan is looking for her and instead spends her time going on dates with the equally free-spirited Yan and his biker friends. One night, Little Liang goes camping in a tent with Yan, but freezes up and pulls away when he kisses her neck; she nervously explains that she is a virgin. She records a voice message begging the more romantically experienced Big Liang to physically reciprocate her attraction to Yan on her behalf, promising to paint her designs in return. Soon after, she reverts to Big Liang, who forcefully kisses a shocked Yan.

Big Liang signs a promising contract with Mr. Gao's agency using Little Liang's designs, and is hopeful that she can rekindle her relationship with Mao, who appears impressed by and attracted to Liang's "rediscovered" creativity. That night, however, Big Liang and Bai are celebrating at a restaurant when Mao and Xiao Yu arrive and sit at the adjoining private room, unaware that Big Liang and Bai are there within earshot. Mao confesses to Xiao Yu that he doubts that he and Liang will end up together long-term. Overhearing this, Big Liang is devastated and returns home, where she eats a chocolate. Little Liang learns about Big Liang's floundering relationship and encourages Big Liang to shake off the rust and pour herself back into her art to help take her mind off Mao. Together, with the help of several chocolates, Big Liang and Little Liang take turns filling a room with their art.

Little Liang hosts a solo gallery exhibition of the art created by her and Big Liang, which is a smashing success. Just as she reverts to Big Liang, Mr. Gao puts her on the spot, presenting her with an empty canvas and asking her to demonstrate her talent for spontaneity for a live audience. Big Liang panics and runs off to the bathroom, preparing to eat another chocolate so Little Liang can complete the task, but steels herself and returns to the gallery, handing the uneaten chocolate to Bai. Big Liang paints a beautiful painting of a happy, contented young woman, which the audience enthusiastically applauds as she smiles.

After the exhibition, as Mao is driving Liang home, he admits that he failed to properly appreciate her over the course of their 10-year relationship, and that he wants her to be happy. Liang, who is sitting in the back seat, tells him that she doesn't blame him, but no longer wants to linger behind him waiting for him to turn around.

Big Liang and Bai realize that they have only 10 chocolates left (earlier, a newscast had revealed the only factory in the world that produced the magic chocolates had been destroyed in a freak accident by a meteor from space). Big Liang, grateful for her younger self's assistance, records a message telling Little Liang that the remaining time is hers to use however she wishes, and eats a chocolate.

Little Liang seeks out Yan, but is upset to learn that he has a new girlfriend, having moved on after being confused and hurt by Little Liang's sporadic appearances, disappearances, and seemingly erratic behavior. She confronts him at a biker bar, where he tells her that she can't give him what he wants, and she leaves, angry and hurt. Mao confronts Yan outside the bar, and the two fight over the fact that they each keep seeing the other with Liang.

Little Liang, misunderstanding Yan's comment to mean that he thinks she can't give him the physical intimacy that he wants, follows him home, where she begins to undress and attempts to kiss Yan. She is rebuffed once again by Yan, who tells her that he and his girlfriend are leaving the city the next morning. Little Liang, in a final act of desperation and over Bai's protests, consumes all nine of the remaining chocolates at once, hoping to stay in her current form long enough to win back Yan. As she reaches the train platform, however, her vision starts to blur, and she collapses dizzily to the ground, unable to do anything but watch helplessly as Yan and his girlfriend board the train and depart.

The unconscious Liang is rushed to a hospital, where she begins to flatline as doctors diagnose her as overdosing on an unknown substance. Within the confines of her mind, Big Liang and Little Liang encounter each other face-to-face for the first time. Little Liang sobs that there is nobody in Big Liang's world who cares about her, and Big Liang consoles her, telling Little Liang how much positive influence she has had on her. As Liang's body nears death, the mental world floods with water, and Little Liang starts to drown. Big Liang breaks through a glass barrier and swims to Little Liang, embracing her. Little Liang assures Big Liang that she, in her youthful spirit, will always live on inside her, and encourages her to return to the world of the living. Little Liang drifts away and vanishes into the depths, using her last breath to tell Big Liang that she is proud of the woman that she has become, and Liang wakes from unconsciousness.

Some time later, Yan is biking in a different city when he looks up, seeing a digital billboard showing an advertisement featuring one of Liang's designs. Back in Beijing, Mao runs naked through the streets to Liang's apartment to get her attention while holding a sign asking Liang if she will take him back. Liang looks out her window at him and smiles slightly.

== Cast ==
- Ni Ni as Liang Xia
- Wallace Huo as Mao Liang
- Ma Su as Bai Xiaoning
- Darren Wang as Yan Yan
- Raina Liu as Xiao Yu, Mao Liang's assistant
- Mike Sui as the Magic Chocolate Company Owner
- Vicky Yu as Yan Yan's girlfriend
- Qu Zhe Ming as a Random Supporting Role

== Production ==
Principal photography begun in January 2016, and wrapped up in March 2016.

== Awards and nominations ==
Award	Category	Nominee	Result	Ref.
14th Changchun Film Festival	Best Directorial Debut	Zhang Mo	Won	

== See also ==
- Dr. Jekyll and Mr. Hyde
- Dissociative identity disorder
- Time-travel romance
