= Who's the Keyman =

- Simplified Chinese: 我是大侦探
- Traditional Chinese: 我是大偵探
- Hanyu Pinyin: Wǒ Shì Dà Zhēntàn
- Genre: Variety show
- Directed by: He Chen
- Starring: He Jiong; Deng Lun; Han Xue; Wowkie Zhang; Ma Sichun; Leo Wu
- Narrated by: Zhu Jun
- Country of origin: China
- Original language: Chinese
- No. of episodes: 13

Production
- Camera setup: Multicamera setup
- Running time: 90 minutes
- Production company: Hunan Broadcasting System

Original release
- Network: Hunan Television
- Release: March 24 – June 16, 2018

Related
- Who's the Murderer

Who's the Keyman (simplified Chinese: 我是大侦探; traditional Chinese: 我是大偵探; pinyin: Wǒ Shì Dà Zhēntàn) is a Chinese variety show produced by Hunan Television and Mango TV. The stars He Jiong, Deng Lun main casts, alongside Han Xue, Wowkie Zhang, Ma Sichun and Leo Wu as guests. The show is a remade version of Who's the Murderer.

== Format ==
In each episode's prologue, the cast learns the crime setup and chooses roles—detective or suspect. Suspects get detailed backstories and can withhold info unless questioned; only the keyman can lie. Gold keys are given in advance—correctly identifying the keyman lets players keep their key; wrong guesses must return it.

- Alibi: Each player introduces their suspect character, shares their connection to the victim, and explains their whereabouts before, during, and after the crime.
- On-Site Investigation: Players are split into three teams and given ten minutes to investigate the crime scene. Each has a phone and may take up to ten photos.
- Briefing: Players present their collected evidence and may question others about it. Afterward, each states who they currently believe is the keyman.
- First Keyman Vote: After hearing each player’s briefing, the detective secretly casts a vote on who they suspect is the keyman.
- Additional On-Site Investigation: Players gather at the crime scene for group discussion, held alongside the 1-on-1 Interrogation.
- 1-on-1 Interrogation: The innocent detective summons players for further questioning.
- Final Keyman Vote: After interrogations, players give final statements and the detective debriefs. Following 5 minutes of investigation, players secretly vote for the keyman. The most-voted player is arrested. Correct voters keep gold keys; detectives who guess right twice earn two keys, and suspects who avoid detection earn one.

In the final episode, all six players are detectives and the keyman is an NPC. Players form two teams led by the top two gold key holders. The leaders use clues to identify the keyman. If they succeed, all players earn a gold key. A hidden key box grants an extra key to its finder. The player with the most gold keys becomes "The Best Detective."

== Casts ==
| Name | Appearance | Role |
|---|---|---|
| He Jiong | Episode 1–13 | Main cast |
| Deng Lun | Episode 1–13 | Main cast |
| Han Xue | Episode 1, 3–6 | Recurring cast |
| Wowkie Zhang | Episode 2–6, 9–10, 12–13 | Recurring cast |
| Ma Sichun | Episode 2–13 | Recurring cast |
| Leo Wu | Episode 1–6, 9–13 | Recurring cast |

== Episodes ==
| Episode # | Broadcast Date | Guest(s) | Case Briefing | Keyman | Results |
|---|---|---|---|---|---|
| 1 | 24 March 2018 | Zhang Ruoyun, Zhang Tian'ai | An Inn; Background: The kids of Jia were missing Detective: Zhang Ruoyun; He Loneliness: He Jiong; Deng Cool: Deng Lun; Waiter Lei: Leo Wu; Xue Wuqing: Han Xue; Customer Zhang: Zhang Ruoyun; General Ai: Zhang Tian'ai | Leo Wu | Keyman won Arrested: He Jiong (He Loneliness) |
| 2 | 31 March 2018 | Zhang Ruoyun | Meeting in 1998; Background: Mr. Zhen was attacked Detective: He Jiong; Director He: He Jiong; Lun Ba: Deng Lun; Zhen Chun: Ma Sichun; Lei Haowa: Leo Wu; Big Qiaqia: Wowkie Zhang; Zhang Kuang: Zhang Ruoyun | Wowkie Zhang | Cast won |
| 3 | 7 April 2018 | — | Mysterious Museum: Part 1 Background: The Heart of Malan was stolen Detective: Wowkie Zhang; He Dazui: He Jiong; Deng Youwei: Deng Lun; Ma Shangyan: Ma Sichun; Lei Xiuxiu: Leo Wu; Da Baobei: Wowkie Zhang; Xue Xiaoxiao: Han Xue | Han Xue | Cast won |
| 4 | 14 April 2018 | — | Mysterious Museum: Part 2 Background: The Penglai Fairyland was destroyed He Dazui: He Jiong; Deng Youwei: Deng Lun; Ma Shangyan: Ma Sichun; Lei Xiuxiu: Leo Wu; Da Baobei: Wowkie Zhang; Xue Xiaoxiao: Han Xue | Han Xue | Cast won |
| 5 | 21 April 2018 | — | Mysterious Resort: Part 1 Background: Security Zhen was attacked Detective: Leo Wu; He Shouwu: He Jiong; Deng Xingao: Deng Lun; Ma Daha: Ma Sichun; Lei Haobang: Leo Wu; Da Maha: Wowkie Zhang; Xue Gao: Han Xue | Ma Sichun | Keyman won Arrested: He Jiong (He Shouwu) |
| 6 | 29 April 2018 | — | Mysterious Resort: Part 2 Background: Zhen Ai was attacked Detective: Han Xue; He Shouwu: He Jiong; Deng Xingao: Deng Lun; Ma Daha: Ma Sichun; Lei Haobang: Leo Wu; Da Maha: Wowkie Zhang; Xue Gao: Han Xue | Deng Lun | Keyman won Arrested: He Jiong (He Shouwu) |
| 7 | 5 May 2018 | Wei Daxun, Bai Jingting, Yang Mi | Unable to Get out of the Old Mansion: Part 1 Background: Zhen Xin was attacked Detective: Deng Lun; He Kuaile: He Jiong; Deng Dadan: Deng Lun; Assistant Ma: Ma Sichun; Wei Le'ai: Wei Daxun; Bai Mengxiang: Bai Jingting; Mi Yue: Yang Mi | Wei Daxun | Keyman won Arrested: He Jiong (He Kuaile) |
| 8 | 12 May 2018 | Wei Daxun, Bai Jingting, Yang Mi | Unable to Get out of the Old Mansion: Part 2 Background: Zhen Xin was attacked Detective: Wei Daxun; He Kuaile: He Jiong; Deng Dadan: Deng Lun; Assistant Ma: Ma Sichun; Wei Le'ai: Wei Daxun; Bai Mengxiang: Bai Jingting; Mi Yue: Yang Mi | Helper: Yang Mi; Keyman: Ma Sichun; The first episode to involve two keymen. | Cast won |
| 9 | 19 May 2018 | Huang Lei | Adventure in the Faraway Town: Part 1 Background: Zhen Siba was fainted Detective: He Jiong; He Bi: He Jiong; Lun Bi: Deng Lun; Ma Lanshan: Ma Sichun; Wu Yu: Leo Wu; Da Guangquan: Wowkie Zhang; Huang Dou: Huang Lei | Leo Wu | Cast won |
| 10 | 26 May 2018 | Huang Lei | Adventure in the Faraway Town: Part 2 Background: Zhen Xiang was kidnapped Detective: Ma Sichun; He Bi: He Jiong; Lun Bi: Deng Lun; Ma Lanshan: Ma Sichun; Wu Yu: Leo Wu; Da Guangquan: Wowkie Zhang; Huang Dou: Huang Lei | Deng Lun | Cast won |
| 11 | 2 June 2018 | Zhang Ruoyun, Kenny Lin | Ten Years After Graduction; Background: Zhen Keai was attacked Detective: Leo Wu; He Menmian: He Jiong; Deng Youxi: Deng Lun; Ma Touqin: Ma Sichun; Zhang Tiemo: Zhang Ruoyun; Lin Ke: Kenny Lin | Ma Sichun | Cast won |
| 12 | 9 June 2018 | Zhang Ruoyun | Wrap Battle: Part 1 & 2 Background: Various cases Detectives: Team Deng Lun (Leo Wu, Zhang Ruoyun), Team Ma Sichun (He Jiong, Wowkie Zhang); Lady Han / Tutor Han / Waitress Han: Angela Chang; Cousin Fei: Ariel Li; Steward: Kido Ma; Assistant Liu: Liu Xuequan; Tutor Jin: Jin Jing; Trainee Wei: Wei Xun; Trainee Jiang: Jiang Yu; Gao Xing: Chen Xiang; Gao Ya: Lu Shan | Kido Ma, Jin Jing, Chen Xiang | Team Deng won in Scenario 1 Arrested by Team Ma: Liu Xuequan (Assistant Liu) Team Ma won in Scenario 2 Arrested by Team Deng: Wei Xun (Trainee Wei) Cast won in Scenario 3 The Best Detective: Deng Lun |
| 13 | 16 June 2018 | Zhang Ruoyun | Wrap Battle: Part 1 & 2 Background: Various cases Detectives: Team Deng Lun (Leo Wu, Zhang Ruoyun), Team Ma Sichun (He Jiong, Wowkie Zhang); Lady Han / Tutor Han / Waitress Han: Angela Chang; Cousin Fei: Ariel Li; Steward: Kido Ma; Assistant Liu: Liu Xuequan; Tutor Jin: Jin Jing; Trainee Wei: Wei Xun; Trainee Jiang: Jiang Yu; Gao Xing: Chen Xiang; Gao Ya: Lu Shan | Kido Ma, Jin Jing, Chen Xiang | Team Deng won in Scenario 1 Arrested by Team Ma: Liu Xuequan (Assistant Liu) Team Ma won in Scenario 2 Arrested by Team Deng: Wei Xun (Trainee Wei) Cast won in Scenario 3 The Best Detective: Deng Lun |
