= Bride Wars (2015 film) =

- Theatrical Poster
- Directed by: Tony Chan
- Produced by: Kate Hudson; Jiali Huang; Fruit Chan; Dong Yu
- Starring: Angelababy; Ni Ni; Zhu Yawen; Chen Xiao
- Production companies: Bona Film Group; Fox International Productions
- Release dates: August 18, 2015 (Shanghai); August 20, 2015 (China)
- Running time: 90 minutes
- Country: China
- Language: Mandarin
- Box office: US$27.6 million

Bride Wars (Chinese: 新娘大作战) is a 2015 Chinese romantic comedy film directed by Tony Chan. The film is a remake of 2009's Bride Wars that starred Kate Hudson and Anne Hathaway. It was released in China on August 20, 2015.

== Premise ==
A pair of brides-to-be put their friendship to the test when they battle it out for the perfect wedding scheduled on the same day.

== Cast ==
- Angelababy as He Jing
- Ni Ni as Ma Li
- Zhu Yawen as Luo Dan
- Chen Xiao as Kevin
- He Jiong as Alexander
- Liu Jinshan as Ma Li's father
- Wang Yinan as Xiao Bai
- Xi Wang as Xiao Rou
- Huang Xiaoming as Groom in the opening (Cameo)
- Feng Shaofeng as Priest (Cameo)
- Jing Boran as TV Host (Cameo)
- Du Haitao as Leading workman (Cameo)

== Reception ==
=== Box office ===
The film came in at number three in its opening weekend, earning US$24,220,000 (RMB $154,496,958). In its second weekend the film dropped to number seven with $3.34 million. Its two-week total now stands at $27.6 million.

=== Critical response ===
Maggie Lee of Variety said that "a not-great Hollywood romantic comedy gets even worse in this atrocious Chinese remake." Elizabeth Kerr of The Hollywood Reporter called the film "a facile and uninspired remake of a facile and uninspired original."
