= Shigeo Kobayashi =

Japanese actor (born 1970)

- Born: April 21, 1970 (age 55); Tokyo, Japan
- Citizenship: Japan
- Occupation: Actor
- Years active: 1990–present

Shigeo Kobayashi (小林 成男, Kobayashi Shigeo; born April 21, 1970) is a Japanese actor. Born and raised in Tokyo, Kobayashi worked on over 80 films, theatrical productions and TV drama series. In 2008, he played the leading role in a short film "Todai (the Light House)" a part of Otokotachi no Uta. His most recent work includes the role of a Japanese Lieutenant in The Flowers of War, starring Christian Bale and directed by Zhang Yimou. Shigeo continues to build a unique career as an actor, noted for his ability to express subtle emotions.

While attending Keio University, he studied acting as an apprentice of renowned kabuki actor Yorozuya Kinnosuke. After performing in historical plays with Yorozuya, during which he trained for Japanese swordfights, he broadened his scope to film and television. In 1999, he appeared in Railroad Man with Ken Takakura. Over the years he earned recognition as both a film and theatrical actor who specialises in Yakuza, samurai, soldier and detective roles.

== Filmography ==
- Miyazawa Kenji sono ai (1996)
- Railroad Man (1999)
- Kuro no tenshi Vol. 2 (1999)
- The Firefly (2001)
- Araburu tamashii-tachi (2001)
- Shishi no ketsumyaku (2001)
- Gun Crazy: Episode 2 - Beyond the Law (video 2002)
- Jitsuroku Andō-gumi gaiden: Garō no okite (2002)
- Shin jingi no hakaba (2002)
- Gokudō Seisen: Jihaado III (2002)
- Gokudō Seisen: Jihaado II (2002)
- Gokudō Seisen: Jihaado (2002)
- Deadly Outlaw: Rekka (2002)
- Kumiso (2002)
- Flower and Snake (2004)
- Izo (2004)
- Shibuya monogatari (2005)
- Indian Summer (2005)
- Surōnin: Tsukikage Hyōgo (TV series 2007)
- Otoko no Kosodate (TV series 2007)
- Otokotachi no Uta (2008)
- Tajomaru (2009)
- The Flowers of War (2011)
