= Nanjing Communication College =

Private college in Nanjing, Jiangsu, China

Nanjing Communication College (南京传媒学院) is a private undergraduate college in Nanjing, Jiangsu, China. It is currently owned and operated by the private Huaxia Group Holdings Limited Company (华夏集团控股有限公司).

In 2004, the private Nanjing Meiya Education Investment Limited Company (南京美亚教育投资有限公司) and the Communication University of China signed a university-name licensing contract. The contract allowed the company to open a no-relation independent private undergraduate college in Nanjing under the name Communication University of China, Nanjing (中国传媒大学南广学院; lit. 'China Communication University Nan'guang College'; used from 2004 to 2020). In 2008, the Ministry of Education of China required such independent colleges to change their names. In 2020, the Jiangsu Provincial People's Government decided and renamed the college Nanjing Communication College (南京传媒学院) in Chinese. The college never had any affiliation with the Communication University of China in Beijing.
