= The Flowers of War =

2011 Chinese-Hong Kong film by Zhang Yimou

- Theatrical release poster
- Traditional Chinese: 金陵十三釵
- Simplified Chinese: 金陵十三钗
- Literal meaning: Thirteen Hairpins of Jinling
- Hanyu Pinyin: Jīnlíng shísān chāi
- Directed by: Zhang Yimou
- Written by: Liu Heng
- Based on: 13 Flowers of Nanjing by Geling Yan
- Produced by: William Kong; David Linde; Zhang Weiping; Zhang Yimou; Brandt Andersen
- Starring: Christian Bale; Ni Ni; Tong Dawei; Atsuro Watabe
- Cinematography: Zhao Xiaoding
- Edited by: Peicong Meng
- Music by: Qigang Chen
- Production companies: New Pictures Film Corporation; Row 1 Productions
- Distributed by: Edko Films (Hong Kong)
- Release dates: December 16, 2011 (China); January 19, 2012 (Hong Kong); January 20, 2012 (United States)
- Running time: 146 minutes
- Countries: China; Hong Kong
- Languages: Mandarin; Cantonese; English; Japanese
- Budget: $94 million
- Box office: $98.2 million

The Flowers of War (Chinese: 金陵十三钗, Pinyin: Jīnlíng Shísān Chāi ) is a 2011 historical drama war film directed by Zhang Yimou, starring Christian Bale, Ni Ni, Zhang Xinyi, Tong Dawei, Atsuro Watabe, Shigeo Kobayashi and Cao Kefan. A Chinese-Hong Kong co-production, the film is based on a novella by Geling Yan, 13 Flowers of Nanjing, inspired by the diary of Minnie Vautrin. The story is set in Nanjing, China, during the 1937 Nanjing Massacre in the Second Sino-Japanese War. A group of escapees, finding sanctuary in a church compound, try to survive the Japanese atrocities.

It was selected as the Chinese entry for Best Foreign Language Film at the 84th Academy Awards, but did not make the final shortlist. It also received a nomination for the 69th Golden Globe Awards. The 6th Asian Film Awards presented The Flowers of War with several individual nominations, including Best Film. The film's North American distribution rights were acquired by Wrekin Hill Entertainment, in association with Row 1 Productions, leading to an Oscar-qualifying limited release in New York, Los Angeles and San Francisco in late December 2011, with general release in January 2012.

The Flowers of War received mixed reviews from critics and was a box office bomb, grossing only $98 million against a $94 million budget.

== Plot ==
In 1937, Japan invades China, beginning the Second Sino-Japanese War. The Imperial Japanese Army overruns China's capital city, Nanjing, in December and carries out the Nanjing massacre. As the Japanese overrun the Chinese army, desperate schoolgirls flee to the sanctuary of their convent at a Western-run Roman Catholic church. John Miller, an American mortician on a job to bury the head priest, joins the group of schoolgirls. He finds George, an orphan boy who was raised by the dead priest and taught English. Soon a group of flamboyant prostitutes arrive at the cathedral, seeking refuge by hiding in the cellar. Pretending to be a priest, Miller tries to keep everyone safe while repairing the convent's truck to escape.

After an incident when rogue Japanese forces assault the church and are beaten back by the dying effort of a lone Chinese Major, Japanese Colonel Hasegawa promises to protect the convent by placing guards outside the gate and requests that the schoolgirls sing a chorale for him. Several days later, he hands Miller an official invitation for the schoolgirls to sing at the Japanese Army's victory celebration. Fearing for the safety of the virginal schoolgirls, Miller declines. Hasegawa informs him that it is an order and that the girls are going to be picked up the next day. Before they leave, the Japanese soldiers count the schoolgirls and erroneously include one of the prostitutes (who has strayed from the cellar), totaling 13.

When the de facto leader of the schoolgirls, Shu Juan, convinces them that they are better off committing suicide by jumping off the church tower, they are saved at the last moment when the de facto leader of the prostitutes, Yu Mo, convinces her group to protect the schoolgirls by taking their place at the Japanese party. As there are only 12 prostitutes, George, the dead priest's adoptive son, volunteers as well. Miller initially opposes their self-sacrificial decision but relents and assists in disguising them, using his skills as a mortician to adjust their makeup and cut their hair to appear like schoolgirls. The prostitutes also create knives out of broken windows and hide them in their cloaks.

The next day, the "13 Flowers of Nanjing" are led away by the unsuspecting Japanese soldiers. After they depart, Miller hides the schoolgirls on the truck he repaired. Using a single-person permit provided by Mr. Meng (the father of Shu, one of the schoolgirls), who's a Chinese collaborator of the Japanese (and is later killed by them), drives out of Nanjing. In the last scene, the truck is seen driving on a deserted highway heading west, away from the Japanese army. The fate of the 13 Flowers remains unknown, apparently martyring themselves for the schoolgirls' freedom.

== Cast ==
- Christian Bale as John Miller
- Ni Ni as Yu Mo
- Zhang Xinyi as Shu
- Tong Dawei as Major Li
- Atsuro Watabe as Colonel Hasegawa
- Shigeo Kobayashi as Lieutenant Kato
- Cao Kefan as Mr. Meng
- Huang Tianyuan as George Chen
- Han Xiting as Yi
- Zhang Doudou as Ling
- Yuan Yangchunzi as Mosquito
- Sun Jia as Hua
- Li Yuemin as Dou
- Bai Xue as Lan
- Takashi Yamanaka as Lieutenant Asakura
- Hirofumi Yasunaga as Japanese Soldier
- Paul Schneider as Terry

== Production ==
In December 2010, it was announced that the film would be made, and pre-production started the same month. They began shooting on location in Nanjing, China, on January 10, 2011. The dialogue of the film was shot about 40% in English and the rest in Mandarin Chinese (particularly in the Nanjing dialect, distinct from Standard Chinese) and Japanese, with an estimated production budget of $94 million, which made it the most expensive film in Chinese history at the time (though has since been surpassed).

No matter what wars or disasters happen in history, what surrounds these times is life, love, salvation and humanity. I hope those things are felt in this story. The human side of the story was more important to me than the background of the Nanjing massacre. Human nature, love and sacrifice – these are the things that are truly eternal. For me, the event is the historical background of the film. But the enduring question of the story is how the human spirit is expressed in wartime.

— Zhang Yimou on the film's message.

To distinguish the film from previous depictions of the same subject, Zhang said that he tried to portray the Japanese invaders with multiple layers. Regarding Colonel Hasegawa's sympathetic features, he explained that "in 1937, the militaristic notion among Japanese armies was very prevalent, and officers were not allowed to sing a homesick folk song, but we still wanted to endow this character with something special." The director articulated that his biggest, though challenging, accomplishment in the film was the creation of John Miller, saying that "this kind of character, a foreigner, a drifter, a thug almost, becomes a hero and saves the lives of Chinese people. That has never ever happened in Chinese film making, and I think it will never happen again in the future." Filming completed within 6 months. One challenging aspect was what Zhang called the "very slow pace" of negotiation with the Chinese censorship authorities during the editing process.

== Marketing ==
On September 9, 2011, the film was retitled The Flowers of War, after a 20-minute screening for prominent U.S. film distributors and the media at the Toronto International Film Festival. Zhang stated that the story in The Flowers of War differs from many other Chinese films on this subject as it is told from the perspectives of women. In October 2011, the first trailer was released, making way for an American trailer to be revealed.

== Release ==
On November 22, 2011, New Pictures Film requested an inflation in the minimum ticket price within China. When in negotiations with the eight cinema circuits in question, it resulted in a threat to boycott the movie over the distributors' share. Wu Hehu, the general manager of Shanghai United Cinema Circuit, made a statement, saying "this is a simple business situation. Without the agreement, we cannot screen the film." Zhang Weiping, producer of The Flowers of War and head of New Pictures Film, also refused to make any concessions. A letter was sent to the Film Bureau of SARFT, hoping it would mediate the dispute. At the order of SARFT, both sides were to reach a compromise, which was achieved after four hours of negotiation.

=== Box office ===
The film grossed US$98,227,017, including US$95 million in China, US$1,331,369 in Hong Kong, and $311,434 in the United States and Canada.

==== China ====
The Flowers of War was released in China just days after the 74th anniversary of the Nanjing Massacre. In its first four days of release, it took in $24 million at the box office. It was the top-grossing Chinese film of 2011, having earned $70 million after two weeks. After 17 days, the movie had grossed nearly $83 million, making it the sixth-highest-grossing film in China, following American exports such as Transformers: Revenge of the Fallen ($145.5 million) and Avatar ($204 million). After five weeks of release the movie earned $93 million. The film reportedly earned $95 million in China.

=== Critical reaction ===
The movie received mixed reviews. Rotten Tomatoes reported a 41% critical approval rating based on 58 reviews, with an average of 5.6/10. The site's consensus reads, "Zhang Yimou's stylistic flair is in full bloom during The Flowers of War, but his colorful treatment of a historical genocide ultimately does a disservice to the horrifying events' inherent drama." Metacritic, another review aggregator, assigned the film an average score of 46 (out of 100) based on 22 reviews from mainstream critics, indicating "mixed or average reviews.

Twitch Film called it "arguably the most eagerly-anticipated Chinese movie of the year", saying that "The Flowers of War is a big movie in every sense of the word, from its kinetic battle scenes to the beautiful photography and impressive performances from a mostly young and inexperienced cast." Pete Hammond from Boxoffice Magazine gave it four stars out of five, and said "The Flowers of War is ultimately an inspiring, stirring and unforgettable human drama in the face of a horrifying war. It is highly recommended."

Variety gave a generally positive review, describing the film as "a uniquely harrowing account of the rape of Nanjing," and defined it as "a work of often garish dramatic flourishes yet undeniable emotional power, finding humor and heartbreak in a tale of unlikely heroism in close quarters." Andrew Pulver describes it as "a new dawn in China-Hollywood co-operation", arguing that "this ambitious war film from Zhang Yimou is an attempt to turn the revolting aftermath of the 1937 Japanese assault on Nanjing into a globally friendly, putatively inspiring epic that also aims to underscore the US and China's geopolitical mutual respect."

Most negative feedback from critics were similar to that from Toronto Star, which gave the film two and a half out of four, and said that "the drama is often weakened by the penchant for creating spectacles." Roger Ebert, who gave the film two out of four stars, took issue with making the story about a white American, "Can you think of any reason the character John Miller is needed to tell his story? Was any consideration given to the possibility of a Chinese priest? Would that be asking for too much?"

=== Accolades ===
Award	Category	Recipients and nominees	Result
Asian Film Awards	Best Composer	Qigang Chen	Nominated
Asian Film Awards	Best Costume Designer	William Chang	Nominated
Asian Film Awards	Best Director	Zhang Yimou	Nominated
Asian Film Awards	Best Film	The Flowers of War	Nominated
Asian Film Awards	Best Newcomer	Ni Ni	Won
Asian Film Awards	Best Screenwriter	Geling Yan and Liu Heng	Nominated
Golden Globe Awards	Best Foreign Language Film	The Flowers of War	Nominated
Hong Kong Film Award	Best Film of Mainland and Taiwan	The Flowers of War	Nominated
The Golden Reel Awards	Best Sound Editing – Foreign Feature	Row 1 Entertainment	Won

=== Home media ===
The Flowers of War was released on Blu-ray Disc and DVD on June 10, 2012. In the United States, the DVD and Blu-ray releases grossed $2,418,217 in physical sales. In the United Kingdom, it was 2012's seventh best-selling foreign-language film on physical home video formats, and the year's second best-selling Asian-language film (below The Raid).

== See also ==
- List of submissions to the 84th Academy Awards for Best Foreign Language Film
- List of Chinese submissions for the Academy Award for Best Foreign Language Film
- Golden Globe Award for Best Foreign Language Film
