= Magnolia Award for Best Actress in a Television Series =

Chinese television award

Magnolia Award for Best Actress is awarded under the Shanghai Television Festival.

== Winners and nominees ==
=== 2020s ===
Year	Winner and nominees	English title	Original title
2026	Yang Zi	Born to Be Alive	生命树
2026	Wu Yue	Silent Honor	沉默的荣耀
2026	Yang Mi	This Thriving Land	生万物
2026	Sun Li	A Better Life	蛮好的人生
2026	Ren Suxi	Endless Protection	无尽的尽头
2025	Song Jia	She and Her Girls	山花烂漫时
2025	Liu Yifei	The Tale of Rose	玫瑰的故事
2025	Ma Yili	To the Wonder	我的阿勒泰
2025	Yan Ni	Romance in the Alley	小巷人家
2025	Yang Zi	Flourished Peony	国色芳华
2024	Zhou Xun	Imperfect Victim	不完美受害人
2024	Ren Suxi	There Will Be Ample Time	故乡，别来无恙
2024	Tang Yan	Blossoms Shanghai	繁花
2024	Yang Zi	Lost You Forever	长相思 第一季
2024	Yan Ni	Grandma's New World	外婆的新世界
2022-2023	Wu Yue	Bright Future	县委大院
2022-2023	Tan Zhuo	Enemy	对手
2022-2023	Yin Tao	A Lifelong Journey	人世间
2022-2023	Sun Li	The Ideal City	理想之城
2022-2023	Zhao Liying	Wild Bloom	野蛮生长
2021	Tong Yao	Nothing But Thirty	三十而已
2021	Ni Ni	My Best Friend's Story	流金岁月
2021	Reyizha	Minning Town	山海情
2021	Yan Ni	The Stage	装台
2021	Tan Songyun	Go Ahead	以家人之名
2020	Yan Ni	Growing Pains	少年派
2020	Sun Li	I Will Find You a Better Home	安家
2020	Ma Yili	On the Road	在远方
2020	Hai Qing	A Little Reunion	小欢喜
2020	Qin Hailu	The Legendary Tavern	老酒馆

=== 2010s ===
Year	Winner and nominees	English title	Original title
2019	Jiang Wenli	The Story of Zheng Yang Gate	正阳门下小女人
2019	Liu Pei	Memories of Peking	芝麻胡同
2019	Wan Qian	Lost in 1949	脱身
2019	Yao Chen	All Is Well	都挺好
2019	Zhao Liying	The Story of Minglan	知否知否应是红肥绿瘦
2018	Ma Yili	The First Half of My Life	我的前半生
2018	Hao Lei	The Love of Courtyard	情满四合院
2018	Qin Hailu	White Deer Plain	白鹿原
2018	Sun Li	Nothing Gold Can Stay	那年花开月正圆
2018	Yuan Quan	The First Half of My Life	我的前半生
2017	Yin Tao	Feather Flies To The Sky	鸡毛飞上天
2017	Hai Qing	A Love For Separation	小别离
2017	Jiang Xin	Ode to Joy	欢乐颂
2017	Liu Tao	Ode to Joy	欢乐颂
2017	Ma Yili	Chinese Style Relationship	中国式关系
2016	Sun Li	The Legend of Mi Yue	芈月传
2016	Song Jia	Young Marshall	少帅
2016	Yan Ni	Wang Dahua's Legendary Career	王大花的革命生涯
2016	Zhao Liying	The Journey of Flower	花千骨
2016	Zhao Wei	Tiger Mom	虎妈猫爸
2015	Zhou Xun	Red Sorghum	红高粱
2015	Niu Li	The Chinese Old Peasant	老农民
2015	Tong Liya	The Ordinary World	平凡的世界
2015	Yan Ni	A Servant of Two Masters	一仆二主
2015	Yao Chen	Divorce Lawyers	离婚律师
2014	Sun Li	Hot Mom!	辣妈正传
2014	Mei Ting	Romance of our Parents	父母爱情
2014	Li Xiaoran	May December Love	大丈夫
2014	Gao Yuanyuan	Let's Get Married	咱们结婚吧
2014	Qin Hailu	If You Were Deceived by Life	假如生活欺骗了你
2013	Song Dandan	The Happy Life of Jin Tai Lang	金太狼的幸福生活
2013	Bai Baihe	Floating and Sinking	浮沉
2013	Chen Shu	Zheng Zhe Wu Di	正者无敌
2013	Hai Qing	Xin Shu	心术
2013	Jiang Wenli	Mother Will Marry	娘要嫁人
2012	Song Jia	The Brink	悬崖
2012	Jiang Wenli	Love Comes Knocking on the Door	幸福来敲门
2012	Cecilia Liu	Scarlet Heart	步步惊心
2012	Sun Li	Empresses in the Palace	甄嬛传
2012	Xi Meijuan	The Family and Love	儿女情更长
2011	Chen Shu	Iron Pear	铁梨花
2011	Sheren Tang	No Regrets	巾帼枭雄之义海豪情
2011	Sarina	My Child, My Home	我的孩子我的家
2011	Wang Luodan	A Story of Lala's Promotion	杜拉拉升职记
2011	Yang Mi	Palace	宫
2010	Bai Han	A Beautiful Daughter-in-law Era	媳妇的美好时代
2010	Chen Xiaoyi	Beauty in North	北方有佳人
2010	Zhu Lin	Luo Gu Xiang	锣鼓巷
2010	Wang Luodan	My Youthfulness	我的青春谁做主
2010	Hai Qing	Dwelling Narrowness	蜗居

=== 2000s ===
Year	Winner and nominees	English title	Original title
2009	Song Dandan	Ma Wen's Battle	马文的战争
2009	Yan Ni	The North Wind Blows	北风那个吹
2009	Yuan Li	The King of Shanghai	上海王
2009	Luo Haiqiong	Wanton and Luxurious Living	纸醉金迷
2009	Ada Choi	The Gem of Life	珠光寶氣
2008	Jiang Wenli	Golden Marriage	金婚
2008	Barbie Hsu	Corner with Love	轉角＊遇到愛
2008	Liu Jia	Gobi Mother	戈壁母亲
2008	Yin Tao	The Woman's Lifetime	女人一辈子
2008	Yan Bingyan	The Woman's Lifetime	女人一辈子
2007	Rene Liu	New Age of Marriage	新结婚时代
2007	Chae Rim	Dal-ja's Spring	달자의 봄
2007	Zheng Zhenyao	Red Streamer	红幡
2007	Chen Xiaoyi	Remarriage of A Police Woman	半路夫妻
2007	Sun Li	Shanghai Bund	新上海滩
2006	Emma Lung	Stranded	
2006	Kelly Macdonald	The Girl in the Café	
2006	Felicitas Woll	Dresden	Dresden - das Inferno
2006	Iwona Sitkowska	The Feast of Saint Barbara	Barbórka
2006	Aglaia Szyszkowitz	Der Todestunnel	1200º: La Verità della Tunnel della Morte
2005	Zhang Shaohua	Mystery	秘密
2004	Anat Waxman	Round Trip	Al HaKav
2001	Anne-Marie Duff	Sinners	
2000	Chen Jin	Xiang yi nian nian	相依年年

=== 1990s ===
Year	Winner and nominees	English title	Original title
1998	Sa Rina	Trams in Midnight	午夜有轨电车
1996	Catherine Jacob	Sur un air de mambo	
1994	Ingrid Timková	The Angel of Mercy	Anjel Milosrdenstva
1992	Eszter Nagy-Kálózy	Édes Anna	
1990	Wang Pin	A Year after Marriage	结婚一年间

=== 1980s ===
Year	Winner and nominees	English title	Original title
1988	Angelina Stepanova	Zapomnite menya takoy	
