= 30th China TV Golden Eagle Awards =

Chinese TV awards ceremony in 2020

- Date: 18 October 2020
- Site: Hunan International Conference & Exhibition Center
- Hosted by: He Jiong; Liu Tao

Television coverage
- Channel: Hunan Television

30th China TV Golden Eagle Awards
- Simplified Chinese: 第30届中国电视金鹰奖
- Traditional Chinese: 第30屆中國電視金鷹獎
Transcriptions
Standard Mandarin
- Hanyu Pinyin: Dì Sānshījiè Zhōngguó Diànshì Jīnyīngjiǎng

The 30th Golden Eagle Awards ceremony was held in Changsha, Hunan, China, on 18 October 2020.

== Winners and nominators ==
Best Television Series	Lifetime Achievement Award
Diplomatic Situation; Like a Flowing River; The Longest Day in Chang'an; The Thunder; The Story of Minglan; A Little Reunion; The Communist Liu Shaoqi; All Is Well	Li Baotian; Chen Duo; Liu Xiaoli
Best Director	Best Screenwriter
Kong Sheng–Like a Flowing River; Bateer–National Children; Cao Dun–The Longest Day in Chang'an; Liu Jiang–The Legendary Tavern; Song Yeming–Diplomatic Situation; Wu Ziniu–The Lovely China	Ma Jihonh–Diplomatic Situation; Chen Yuxin–The Thunder; Guo Jingyu–Perfect Youth; Yuan Keping–Like a Flowing River; Guazi Studio–The Longest Day in Chang'an; Zhao Qi–Amnesty 1959
Best Actor	Best Actress
Simon Yam–One Dream One Home; Chen Baoguo–The Legendary Tavern; Wang Jinsong–The Thunder; Wang Kai–Like a Flowing River; Jackson Yee–The Longest Day in Chang'an; Zhao Bo–The Communist Liu Shaoqi	Tong Yao–Like a Flowing River; Jiang Wenli–The Story of Zheng Yang Gate; Tao Hong–A Little Reunion; Wang Qianhua–The Red of Persimmon; Sun Li–I Will Find You a Better Home; Zhao Liying–The Story of Minglan
Favorite Actor	Favorite Actress
Wang Yibo–Gank Your Heart; Jackson Yee; Zhu Yilong; Ren Jialun; Zhang Yixing; Zhang Ruoyun	Zhao Liying–The Story of Minglan; Victoria Song; Tan Songyun; Sun Li; Yang Mi; Esther Yu
Television Documentary	Best TV Variety (Art) Program
Mao Zedong; And Yet the Books; Once Upon a Bite; Revelation of the Huaihai Campaign; Villages in China; Witness	Jiangsu TV 2019–2020 New Year's Eve Concert; The "Most Beautiful Night of 2019" Bilibili Evening Party; 2020 Fujian New Year Celebration Night; China in Stories; Dance Smash
Best Cinematography	Best TV Animated
Jing Chong–The Longest Day in Chang'an; Ji Baichao–The Story of Minglan; Jiang Lijun–Amnesty 1959; Lei Ming–Like a Flowing River; Liu Changjun–The Legendary Tavern; Yang Jun–Ming Dynasty	Silk Road Legend; Ice and Snow Winter Olympics Village; No.23 Niu Naitang; Rainbow Chicks; Yugong Moves a Mountain
