= 24th Shanghai Television Festival =

Chinese TV awards ceremony in 2018

The 24th Shanghai Television Festival (simplified Chinese: 第24届上海电视节; traditional Chinese: 第24屆上海電視節) was held in Shanghai, China between June 11 and June 15, 2018.

== List of winners and nominees ==
Winners are listed first and highlighted in bold.

Best Television Series	Best Director
**White Deer Plain**; The Advisors Alliance; Peace Hotel; ER Doctors; Nirvana in Fire 2; Wonderful Life; Nothing Gold Can Stay; The Love of Courtyard; A Splendid Life in Beijing; The First Half of My Life	**Liu Jin**–**White Deer Plain**; Ding Hei–Nothing Gold Can Stay; Kong Sheng and Li Xue–Nirvana in Fire 2; Shen Yan–The First Half of My Life; Zhang Yongxin–The Advisors Alliance
Best Actor	Best Actress
**He Bing**–**The Love of Courtyard**; He Ge–Game of Hunting; Lei Jiayin–The First Half of My Life; Wu Xiubo–The Advisors Alliance; Zhang Jiayi–White Deer Plain	**Ma Yili**–**The First Half of My Life**; Hao Lei–The Love of Courtyard; Qin Hailu–White Deer Plain; Sun Li–Nothing Gold Can Stay; Yuan Quan–The First Half of My Life
Best Supporting Actor	Best Supporting Actress
**Yu Hewei**–**The Advisors Alliance**; He Bing–White Deer Plain; Ni Dahong–Tracks In The Snow Forest; Yu Haoming–Nothing Gold Can Stay; Zhai Tianlin–White Deer Plain	**Xu Di**–**The First Half of My Life**; Jiang Shan–ER Doctors; Sweet Li–White Deer Plain; Wan Qian–Game of Hunting; Wu Yue–The First Half of My Life
Best Cinematography	Best Art Direction
**Huang Wei**–**White Deer Plain**; Jing Chong–Tribes and Empires: Storm of Prophecy; Sun Molong–Nirvana in Fire 2; Yu Xiaochen–The Love of Courtyard; Zhang Wenjie–The Advisors Alliance	**The Advisors Alliance**; White Deer Plain; Tribes and Empires: Storm of Prophecy; Nothing Gold Can Stay; A Splendid Life in Beijing
Best Writer	
**Qin Wen**–**The First Half of My Life**; Chang Jiang–The Advisors Alliance; Shen Jie–White Deer Plain; Wang Zhili–The Love of Courtyard; Zhang Lai–Peace Hotel	
