= Golden Eagle Award for Best Actress (China) =

Chinese television award category

Golden Eagle Award for Best Actress (Chinese name: 中国电视金鹰奖最佳女主角) is a main category of the China TV Golden Eagle Award. From the 1st to the 5th China TV Golden Eagle Awards, the title was "Outstanding Actress" (優秀女演員). From the 6th to the 17th edition, it was renamed "Best Actress" (最佳女演員). Starting from the 18th edition in 2000, following the upgrade of the Golden Eagle Awards to the China Golden Eagle TV Art Festival, the title changed to "Audience's Choice for Most Popular Actress" (觀眾最喜愛的女演員), selected through public voting from nominees for both categories "Audience’s Favorite Leading Actress" (觀眾最喜愛女主角) and "Audience’s Favorite Supporting Actress" (觀眾最喜愛女配角). In the 19th and 20th editions, it was renamed "Audience's Most Popular Actress" (最受觀眾喜歡的女演員), with the winner chosen by audience votes from the top four or five winners of "Audience's Choice for Actress" (受觀眾喜歡的女演員). From the 21st to the 29th editions, the award was rebranded as "Most Popular Actress" (最具人氣女演員), given to the nominee who received the highest number of votes among all candidates in the "Audience's Choice for Actress" category. Since the 30th edition, the award reverted to the title "Best Actress".

== Records ==
Items	Name	Statistics	Notes
Most wins	Sun Li	2 wins	
Youngest winner	Sun Li	Age 22	for Goddess of Mercy

- Actresses who also won leading actress in a motion picture of China Literary and Art Circles Awards:
  - Golden Rooster Award for Best Actress : Li Ling, Jiang Wenli, Zhou Xun, Song Jia
  - Hundred Flowers Award for Best Actress : Zhou Xun, Zhao Wei, Da Song Jia

== Winners and nominees ==
=== 2020s ===
Year	Number	Actress	Television Series
2026	33rd	Song Jia 宋佳	She and Her Girls 山花烂漫时
2026	33rd	Ma Yili 马伊琍	To the Wonder 我的阿勒泰
2026	33rd	Ren Suxi 任素汐	Endless Protection 无尽的尽头
2026	33rd	Yan Ni 闫妮	Romance in the Alley 小巷人家
2026	33rd	Yang Zi 杨紫	Born to Be Alive 生命树
2026	33rd	Wu Yue 吴越	Silent Honor 沉默的荣耀
2024	32nd	Zhao Liying 赵丽颖	Wild Bloom 风吹半夏
2024	32nd	Zhou Xun 周迅	Imperfect Victim 不完美受害人
2024	32nd	Li Qin 李沁	Miles to Go 人生之路
2024	32nd	Wu Yue 吴越	Bright Future 县委大院
2024	32nd	Liu Lin 闫妮	A Long Way Home 父辈的荣耀
2024	32nd	Tiffany Tang 唐嫣	Blossoms Shanghai 繁花
2022	31st	Yin Tao 殷桃	A Lifelong Journey 人世间
2022	31st	Zhou Xun 周迅	Medal of the Republic: The Gift from Tu Youyou 功勋: 功勋之屠呦呦的礼物
2022	31st	Yan Ni 闫妮	The Stage 装台
2022	31st	Wu Yue 吴越	Crime Crackdown 扫黑风暴
2022	31st	Reyizha 热依扎	Minning Town 山海情
2022	31st	Jiang Shuying 江疏影	Nothing But Thirty 三十而已
2020	30th	Tong Yao 童瑶	Like a Flowing River 大江大河
2020	30th	Jiang Wenli 蒋雯丽	The Story of Zheng Yang Gate 正阳门下小女人
2020	30th	Tao Hong 陶虹	A Little Reunion 小欢喜
2020	30th	Wang Qianhua 王茜华	The Red of Persimmon 岁岁年年柿柿红
2020	30th	Sun Li 孙俪	I Will Find You a Better Home 安家
2020	30th	Zhao Liying 赵丽颖	The Story of Minglan 知否？知否？应是绿肥红瘦

=== 2010s ===
Year	Number	Actress	Television Series
2018	29th	Dilraba Dilmurat 迪丽热巴	Pretty Li Huizhen 漂亮的李慧珍
2018	29th	Ding Liuyuan 丁柳元	Original Inspiration 初心
2018	29th	Liu Tao 刘涛	Ode to Joy 欢乐颂; The Advisors Alliance 大军师司马懿之军师联盟
2018	29th	Sun Li 孙俪	Nothing Gold Can Stay 那年花开月正圆
2018	29th	Yang Zi 杨紫	Ode to Joy 欢乐颂
2018	29th	Yuan Quan 袁泉	The First Half of My Life 我的前半生
2018	29th	Yin Tao 殷桃	Feather Flies To The Sky 鸡毛飞上天
2018	29th	Kan Qingzi 阚清子	Sparrow 麻雀
2016	28th	Liu Tao 刘涛	The Legend of Mi Yue\羋月傳
2016	28th	Zhao Liying 赵丽颖	The Journey of Flower\花千骨
2016	28th	Tong Liya 佟丽娅	The Ordinary World\平凡的世界
2016	28th	Li Xiaomeng 李小萌	The Ordinary World\平凡的世界
2016	28th	Ma Su 马苏	The Legend of Mi Yue\羋月傳
2016	28th	Xu Baihui 徐百卉	The Legend of Mi Yue\羋月傳
2016	28th	Zuo Xiaoqing 左小青	In the Silence\于无声处
2016	28th	Tang Jingmei 湯晶媚	Ten Miles With Red Army\十送红军
2014	27th	Sun Li 孙俪	Hot Mom!\辣妈正传
2014	27th	Liu Tao 刘涛	To Elderly with Love\老有所依
2014	27th	Hou Mengyao 侯梦瑶	The Story of Mulan\花木兰传奇
2014	27th	Wang Weiwei 王维维	Xin Shu\心术
2014	27th	Wang Like 王力可	Heroes in Sui and Tang Dynasties\隋唐演义
2014	27th	Zhu Dan 朱丹	OB Gyns\爱的妇产科
2014	27th	Song Dandan 宋丹丹	Beautiful Contract\美丽的契约
2014	27th	Gao Yuanyuan 高圆圆	We Get Married\咱们结婚吧
2014	27th	Tian Min 田岷	We Get Married\咱们结婚吧
2014	27th	Siqin Gaowa 斯琴高娃	The Grand Mansion Gate 3\大宅门1912
2014	27th	Liu Lin 刘琳	Romance of Our Parents\父母爱情
2014	27th	Chen Jin 陈瑾	Shen Tou\渗透
2012	26th	Yang Mi 杨幂	Beijing Love Story\北京爱情故事
2012	26th	Song Jia 宋佳	The Cliff\悬崖
2012	26th	Ma Su 马苏	Beauty of Innocence\厂花
2012	26th	Chen Shu 陈数	Iron Pear\铁梨花
2012	26th	Yue Hong 岳红	Running into Good Luck\抬头见喜
2010	25th	Hai Qing 海青	A Beautiful Daughter-in-law Era\媳妇的美好时代
2010	25th	Yan Ni 闫妮	The Wind From North\北风那个吹
2010	25th	Yao Chen 姚晨	Lurk\潜伏
2010	25th	Wang Qianhua 王茜华	Women Country\女人乡村

=== 2000s ===
Year	Number	Actress	Television Series
2008	24th	Jiang Wenli 蒋雯丽	Golden Marriage\金婚
2008	24th	Liu Jia 刘佳	Gebi Mother\戈壁母亲
2008	24th	Tong Lei 童蕾	Song of the Youth\青春之歌
2008	24th	Sa Rina 萨日娜	Chuang Guandong\ 闯关东
2006	23rd	Jiang Qinqin 蒋勤勤	Qiao's Grand Courtyard
2006	23rd	Liu Jia 刘佳	Ren Changxia\任长霞
2006	23rd	Zhu Yuanyuan 朱媛媛	Nine Phoenixes\家有九凤
2006	23rd	Yin Tao 殷桃	Papa Can You Hear Me Sing?\搭错车
2004	22nd	Sun Li 孙俪	Goddess of Mercy\玉观音
2004	22nd	Wang Ji 王姬	The Greatest Building\天下第一楼
2004	22nd	Chen Hao 陈好	Pink Girls\粉红女郎
2004	22nd	Ni Ping 倪萍	Romantic Affairs\最浪漫的事
2004	22nd	Xi Meijuan 奚美娟	To be the Banker or Dealer\坐庄
2003	21st	Song Jia 宋佳	Red Poppies\尘埃落定
2003	21st	Fan Zhibo 范志博	The Female Leader of Tank Squadrons \女装甲团长
2003	21st	Mei Ting 梅婷	Restart Love\让爱重来
2003	21st	Lü Liping 吕丽萍	Big-feet Queen\大脚马皇后
2003	21st	Xie Lan 谢兰	Blood in the Snow\雪白血红
2003	21st	Wang Haiyan 王海燕	Quiet Promise\誓言无声
2002	20th	Lü Liping 吕丽萍	The Years of Intense Emotion\激情燃烧的岁月
2002	20th	Tao Hong 陶虹	Nothing in the Mirror\空镜子
2002	20th	Wang Qian 王茜	The VI Group of Fatal Case\ 重案六组
2002	20th	Xu Qing 许晴	Chinese Women under the Gun of Gestapo\ 许晴
2002	20th	Jiang Shan 江珊	Never Give Up\ 永不放弃
2001	19th	Cao Ying 曹颖	Traceless Snow\大雪无痕
2001	19th	Li Yuanyuan 李媛媛	Century life: Legend of Dong Zhujun\世纪人生：董竹君传奇
2001	19th	Xiong Xiao 肖雄	Top Gun\ 壮志凌云
2001	19th	Liu Bei 刘蓓	The Red Carnation\红色康乃馨
2001	19th	Lei Min 雷敏	Women's SWAT\ 女子特警队
2000	18th	Zhou Xun 周迅	Palace of Desire\大明宫词
2000	18th	Juan Zi 娟子	Beijing Woman\北京女人
2000	18th	Su Jin 苏瑾	Never Close the Eye\永不瞑目
2000	18th	Zhu Yuanyuan 苏瑾	Loquacious Zhang Damin's Happy Life\贫嘴张大民的幸福生活
2000	18th	Yuan Li 袁立	Never Close the Eye\永不瞑目
2000	18th	Xu Xiulin 徐秀林	Loquacious Zhang Damin's Happy Life \贫嘴张大民的幸福生活

=== 1990s ===
Year	Number	Actress	Television Series
1999	17th	Zhao Wei 赵薇	My Fair Princess\还珠格格
1999	17th	Jiang Wenli 蒋雯丽	To Lead by the Hand\牵手
1999	17th	Chang Yuan 常远	Sisters\永远有多远
1998	16th	Li Yuanyuan 李媛媛	Hong Kong Story\香港的故事
1998	16th	Liu Xiaoqing 刘晓庆	Flee Love\逃之恋
1998	16th	Song Chunli 宋春丽	The Right Way\人间正道
1997	15th	Wang Yumei 王玉梅	Sons & Daughters\儿女情长
1997	15th	Wang Ji 王姬	Thunderstorm\雷雨
1997	15th	Tao Huimin 陶慧敏	Country Judge\乡村女法官
1996	14th	Li Lin 李琳	A Woman Aflaoting Men River\趟过男人河的女人
1995	13th	Wang Fuli 王馥荔	Sight of Little Building\小楼风景
1995	13th	Fu Lili 傅丽莉	Miss China of Matheson\洋行里的中国小姐
1995	13th	Xu Qing 许晴	Dong Bian Ri Chu Xi Bian Yu\东边日出西边雨
1994	12th	Wang Ji 王姬	A Native of Beijing in New York\北京人在纽约
1994	12th	Jiang Shan 江珊	Die Satisfied \过把瘾
1994	12th	Zhao Mingming 赵明明	Jin Ke, Shang Ke, Biao Ke \金客、商客、镖客
1993	11th	Lin Fangbin 林芳兵	Tang Ming Huang\唐明皇
1993	11th	Ma Ling 马羚	You Love Me, Tonight\今晚，你爱我
1993	11th	Xu Qing 许晴	Huang Cheng Gen Er\皇城根儿
1992	10th	Li Ling 李羚	Shanghai Family\上海一家人
1991	9th	Zhang Kaili 张凯丽	Aspiration\渴望
1990	8th	Zhou Jie 周洁	Oversea Revenge\海外遗恨

=== 1980s ===
Year	Number	Actress	Television Series
1999	7th	Xu Ya 徐娅	Jia Chun Qiu\家春秋
1988	6th	Ma Lan	Yan Fengying\严凤英
1987	5th	Zhu Lin 朱琳	Triumph in Midnight\凯旋在子夜
1986	4th	Li Weikang 李维康	The Yellow Storm\四世同堂
1985	3rd	Ren Meng 任梦	Storm Tonight\今夜有暴风雪
1984	2nd	Xiang Hong 向虹	The Story of Life\生命的故事
1984	2nd	Mao Shanyu 茅善玉	Xuan Zi\璇子
1983	1st	Qin Yi	Under the Eave of Shanghai\上海屋檐下
1983	1st	Wang Fuli 王馥荔	The Fifth Neighbour\第五家邻居
1983	1st	Xiao Xiong 肖雄	Cuo Tuo Sui Yue\蹉跎岁月
