= Ma Yili =

Chinese actress

- 马伊琍
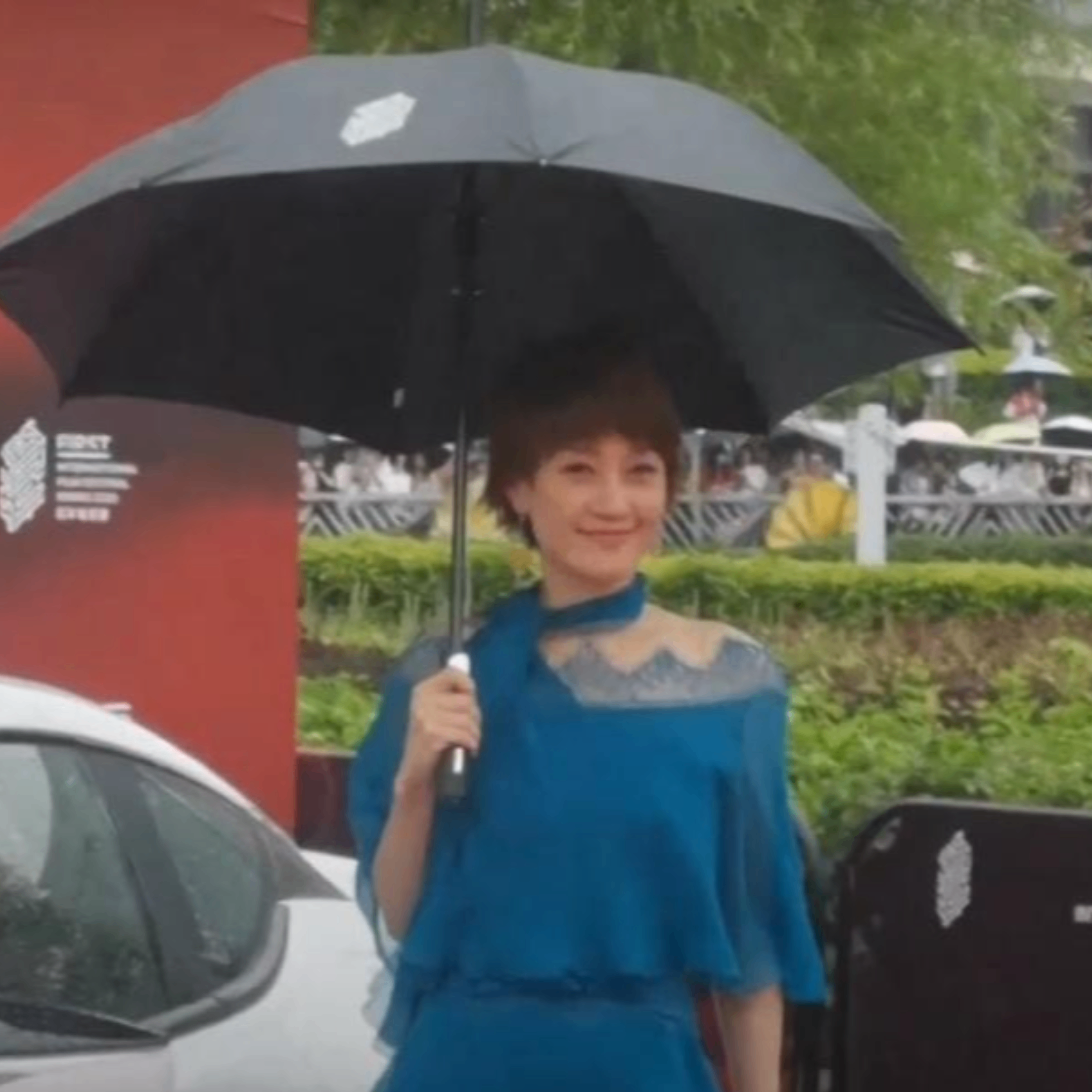
- Ma at the 14th FIRST International Film Festival Red Carpet in August 2020
- Born: 29 June 1976 (age 50); Hongkou District, Shanghai, China
- Education: Shanghai Theatre Academy
- Occupation: Actress
- Years active: 1996–present
- Agent: Easy Entertainment
- Spouse: Wen Zhang (m. 2008; div. 2019)
- Children: 2

Chinese name
- Simplified Chinese: 马伊琍
- Traditional Chinese: 馬伊琍
Transcriptions
Standard Mandarin
- Hanyu Pinyin: Mǎ Yīlì

Ma Yili (Chinese: 马伊琍, born 29 June 1976) is a Chinese actress. She is known for her roles in the television series My Fair Princess III (2003), Qiao's Grand Courtyard (2006), Struggle (2007), The First Half of My Life (2017), Blossoms Shanghai (2023) and To the Wonder (2024), as well as the film B for Busy (2021).

Ma ranked 42nd on Forbes China Celebrity 100 list in 2019.

== Early life ==
Ma was born in Hongkou District, Shanghai on June 29, 1976, with her ancestral home in Rudong County, Nantong, Jiangsu. She entered Shanghai Theatre Academy in 1994, majoring in acting, and graduated in 1998.

== Career ==
Ma started her acting career in the 1996 television series Vacuum Love Records, in which her sweet appearance and strong-willed character left a deep impression on the audience. However, in the next few years, Ma maintained a low profile on screen.

Ma regained attention through the television series Long Live Our Dreams (2000) and Black Hole (2001) and the film Eyes of a Beauty (2001). She actually shaved her head for her role in Long Live Our Dreams. She gained further popularity after she played the role of Ziwei in the third season of the popular drama My Fair Princess (2003). Next came the hit series Qiao's Grand Courtyard (2006), where Ma played an innocent girl who matures through a painful romance. She then starred in the highly popular youth series Struggle (2007). Ma's role as a passionate, direct and optimistic young woman resonated with the thoughts of the young generation, and shot her to widespread fame.

Following her breakthrough, Ma has won various honors and awards, such as the Golden Phoenix Award and Huading Award, and the Best Actress award at the Changchun Film Festival for her role in Life Today (2007), Best Actress award at the Asia Rainbow TV Awards for her role in Marriage Battle (2010) and Best Supporting Actress award at the China Image Film Festival for her role in Tracks Kong Lingxue (2011).

Ma then starred in Two City One Family (2011), which reflects the differences of a couple who come from different cities in China. Ma, who is of Shanghai descent, successfully portrayed the role of a Beijing young lady, and clinched the Best Actress award at the China TV Drama Awards. She then starred in both seasons of Puberty Hit Menopause (2013) which earned high ratings; as well as family drama Little Daddy (2013), directed by her husband Wen Zhang and which she serves as producer.

In 2015, Ma starred in Swan Dive for Love, a series that narrates the story of a white-collar couple striving to make themselves richer amid a series of challenges. She won the Best Actress award at the Huading Awards for her portrayal of a determined and strong-minded career woman. The following year, she starred in Chinese Style Relationship, a critically acclaimed comedy-drama that depicts three Chinese couples as the navigate through life and love. Ma was nominated for Best Actress at the Shanghai Television Festival.

In 2017, Ma starred in romance/family drama The First Half of My Life. Opposite from her usual strong characters, Ma played a struggling housewife in the series. The television series was a major ratings hit in China and was hotly debated on social media sites like Weibo.

In 2018, Ma played a supporting role in the female-centric war film Goddesses in the Flames of War, reportedly receiving no wages for the film. She won the Best Supporting Actress award at the China Movie Channel Media Awards for her performance. Another film which stars in, Enter the Forbidden City won the award for Best Film. The same year, she starred in the mystery film Lost, Found alongside Yao Chen; a remake of the Korean film Missing; as well as crime film The Road Not Taken.

In 2023, Ma starred in Blossoms Shanghai, adapted from Jin Yucheng's novel of the same title.

== Other activities ==
Ma was appointed the National Ambassador for UNICEF China in 2015.

== Personal life ==
While at the Shanghai Theatre Academy in 1996, Ma dated a senior student for a year. They broke up amicably when Ma entered her senior year and the boy graduated. In 1999, Ma was introduced to director Guan Hu through a friend. In 2000, Guan invited Ma to join the cast of his TV drama Black Hole, and the two began a relationship for four years. They broke up in 2004.

Ma met Wen Zhang when filming together Zhang Li's historical drama Blades in 2005. In 2006, when filming TV series Struggle, Ma was pursued at the same time by her co-stars Wen Zhang and Tong Dawei. She, however, went to date Zhang Bo, Wen's college classmate, soon after when shooting the TV series Where is Happiness. Upon learning of Ma's relationship with Zhang, Wen ended his then relationship and renewed his pursuit of Ma, causing a rift between him and Zhang. Ma left Zhang for Wen, though they briefly broke up in early 2007. They quietly registered their marriage in 2008 without having a ceremony or informing their agencies. On 20 September 2008, they have their first daughter, Wen Zhujun (Ima). In August 2013, when Ma was pregnant with her second child, Wen Zhang and actress Yao Di had an extramarital affair. On July 28, 2019, they announced their divorce on Sina Weibo.

== Filmography ==
=== Film ===
Year	English title	Chinese title	Role	Notes/Ref.
1993	Liu Haisu	刘海粟	Chen Xiaojun	
1999	Glass is Transparent	玻璃是透明的	Xiao Yazi	
1999	Kong Yiji	孔乙己	Song Hanyu	
1999	Liao Zhai: Xi Fangping	聊斋之席方平	Du Yucui	
2001	Love at First Sight	一见钟情	Ju Zi	
2001	Eyes of a Beauty	西施眼	Shi Yu	
2003	Sleepless City	危情雪夜	Su Bao	
2007	Life Today	江北好人	Zhao Xiaoyun	
2011	Tracks Kong Lingxue	跟踪孔令学	Yang Qiuyue	
2011	Love Is Not Blind	失恋33天		Cameo
2012	Cold War	寒战	Liu Jiehui's wife	
2013	Badges of Fury	不二神探	Policewoman	Cameo
2016	Cold War 2	寒战2	Chen Xue'er	
2016	When Larry Met Mary	陆垚知马俐		Cameo
2017	The Founding of an Army	建军大业	Xiang Jingyu	
2018	Goddesses in the Flames of War	那些女人		
2018	The Road Not Taken	未择之路	Xiao Mei	
2018	Lost, Found	找到你	Sun Fang	
2019	Enter the Forbidden City	进京城		
2019	My People, My Country	我和我的祖国		

=== Television series ===
Year	English title	Chinese title	Role	Notes/Ref.
1994		哈雷哈雷	Teacher Yin	
1995	Sculpture of Life	生命的雕塑		Cameo
1996	Vacuum Love Records	真空爱情记录	Xia Wenxin	
1997	Heaven Warriors	天国洋将	Yang Zhenmei	
1998	The Puppetmaster	戏梦人生	Chang Qingzhen	
1998	Children of China	中华儿女	Hua Rui	
1998	Years in Hong Kong	香港岁月	Xiao Fang	
2000	Long Live Our Dreams	理想万岁	Xia Xiaoyan	
2000	Previous And Present Life	前世今生	Qin Wanying/Shen Xiaohui	
2000	Our Citizens	咱老百姓之爱要明媚	Lin Yali	
2000	Sleepless Tonight	今夜无眠	Li Xiu	
2000	Perfect Wedding Guide	完全婚姻手册之老公自家好	Wang Che	
2001	Black Hole	黑洞	Xiao Yun	
2001	Happy Family	幸福家庭	Pan Min	
2001	Return Me the Passion	还我激情	Jin Jiali	
2002	Always Keep in Mind	永远的铭记	Shen Xuanqing	
2002	The Eloquent Ji Xiaolan 2	铁齿铜牙纪晓岚2	Yan Ruyu	
2003	My Fair Princess III	还珠格格3	Xia Ziwei	
2003	Yes, I Love You	谁都会说我爱你	Lin Juruo	
2004	Seven Samurai	七武士	Mei Xiaoyao	
2004	Seven Days	七日	Shao Jingran	
2005	Sister Wu	五妹	Sister Wu	
2006	Blue Sea	碧海深沉		Cameo
2006	Qiao's Grand Courtyard	乔家大院	Jiang Xueying	
2006	Wine Alley	酒巷深深	Gu Yu	
2006	Library	天一生水	Lin Ruoyun/ Xie Mingni	
2006	The Moon and The Sunshine	月牙儿与阳光	Zhang Xiaoyue	
2006	The Jinyiwei Guard	锦衣卫	Noble Consort Zheng	
2007	Don't Say Love Is Bitter	别说爱情苦	Yu Diqing	
2007	Struggle	奋斗	Xia Lin	
2007	Where Is Happiness	幸福在哪里	Qi Ruogu	
2008	Silent Beauty	美丽无声	A Ju	
2008	Locking Love	锁春记	Zhuang Zhiyan	
2009	Second Brother	二哥		Cameo
2010	Marriage Battle	婚姻保卫战	Li Mei	
2010	King of Silk	经纬天地	Liang Shun'er	
2010	Puberty Hit Menopause	青春期撞上更年期	He Fei'er	
2011	Two City One Family	双城生活	Hao Jingni	
2012	Beautiful Day	风和日丽	Yang Xiaoyi	
2013	Puberty Hit Menopause 2	青春期撞上更年期2	He Fei'er	
2013	Little Daddy	小爸爸	Li Sanmei	
2015	Swan Dive for Love	北上广不相信眼泪	Pan Yun	
2016	Chinese Style Relationship	中国式关系	Shen Yinan	
2017	Razor	剃刀边缘	Guan Haidan	
2017	The First Half of My Life	我的前半生	Luo Zijun	
2019	On the Road	在远方	Lu Xiaoou	
2020	Miss S	旗袍美探	Su Wenli	
2021	Quiet Among Disquiet	安静	Lin Mo	
2023		好事成双		
2023	Blossoms Shanghai	繁花	Ling Zi	
2024	To the Wonder	我的阿勒泰	Zhang Fengxia	

== Awards and nominations ==
Year	Nominated work	Award	Category	Result	Ref.
2008	Life Today	15th Beijing College Student Film Festival	Best Actress	Nominated	
2008	Life Today	9th Changchun Film Festival	Best Actress	Won	
2009	Life Today	2nd Huading Awards	Best Actress	Won	
2009	Life Today	12th Golden Phoenix Awards	Society Award	Won	
2011	Marriage Battle	1st Asia Rainbow TV Awards	Best Actress in a Comedy Role	Won	
2011	Tracks Kong Lingxue	3rd China Image Film Festival	Best Supporting Actress	Won	
2011	Two City One Family	2nd China TV Drama Awards	Best Actress	Won	
2016	Swan Dive for Love	19th Huading Awards	Best Actress	Won	
2016	Chinese Style Relationship	6th China TV Drama Awards	Outstanding Actress	Won	
2017	Chinese Style Relationship	23rd Shanghai Television Festival	Best Actress	Nominated	
2017	The First Half of My Life	4th Hengdian Film and TV Festival of China	Best Actress	Won	
2018	The First Half of My Life	24th Shanghai Television Festival	Best Actress	Won	
2018	Goddesses in the Flames of War	8th China Movie Channel Media Awards	Best Supporting Actress	Won	
2018	The Road Not Taken	75th Venice Film Festival	Focus China: Actress Award	Won	
2019	Lost, Found	10th China Film Director's Guild Awards	Best Actress	Won	
2019	Lost, Found	25th Huading Awards	Best Actress	Won	
2019	Lost, Found	17th Golden Phoenix Awards	Society Award	Won	
2019	Lost, Found	32nd Golden Rooster Awards	Best Actress	Nominated	
2019	The Road Not Taken	11th Macau International Movie Festival	Best Actress	Nominated	
2019	On The Road	Golden Bud - The Fourth Network Film And Television Festival	Best Actress	Nominated	
2020	On The Road	Best Choice of Multi-Screen Communication	Influential Actress	Won	
2020	On The Road	26th Shanghai Television Festival	Best Actress	Nominated	
2020	Miss S	29th Huading Awards	Best Actress (Contemporary Drama)	Won	
2022	Myth of Love	13th China Film Director's Guild Awards	Best Actress	Nominated	
2025	To the Wonder	30th Shanghai Television Festival	Best Actress	Nominated	
2026	To the Wonder	33rd China TV Golden Eagle Awards	Best Actress	Nominated	
2026	To the Wonder	35th Flying Apsaras Awards	Outstanding Actress	Nominated	
