= Yin Tao =

Chinese actress (born 1979)

- 殷桃
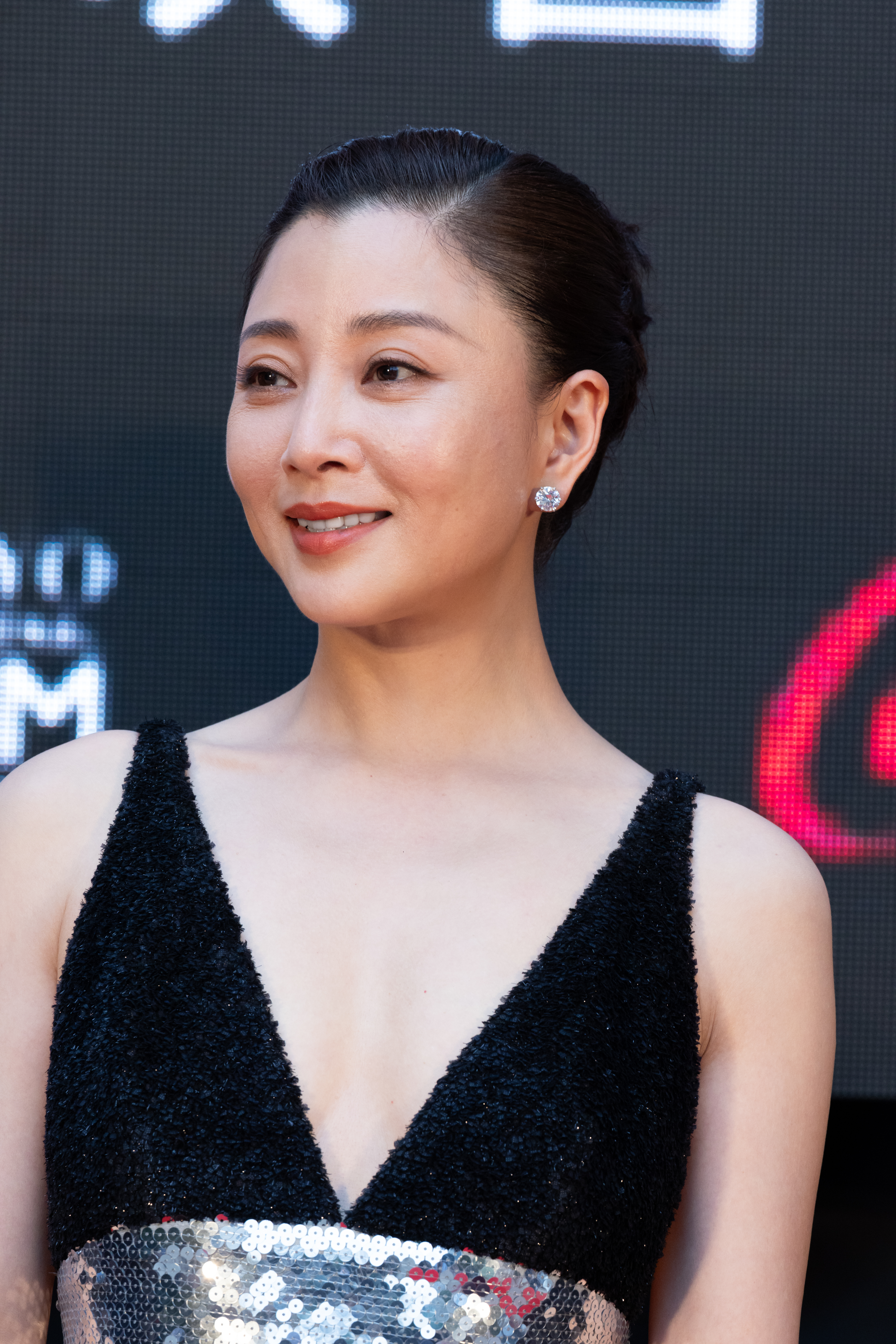
- Yin at the 37th Tokyo International Film Festival in October 2024
- Born: 6 December 1979 (age 46); Shapingba District, Chongqing, China
- Education: People's Liberation Army Arts College
- Occupation: Actress
- Years active: 2003–present
- Agent: Chinese People's Liberation Army Naval Song and Dance Troupe

Yin Tao (Chinese: 殷桃; pinyin: Yīn Táo, born 6 December 1979) is a Chinese actress. In 2017, she became the third Chinese actress to win the "Grand Slam", after winning "Best Actress" at the three biggest Chinese television awards including the Feitian Award, the Golden Eagle Award and the Magnolia Award.

== Biography ==
=== Early life ===
Born and raised in Chongqing, she attended Chongqing Art School in 1996. Her father was a literary soldier. Yin entered People's Liberation Army Arts College in 1999, majoring in drama, where she graduated in 2003. After graduation, Yin worked in People's Liberation Army Naval Song and Dance Troupe.

=== Acting career ===
In 2002, Yin participated in her first stage play while still in college Wait for You in Paradise. Her performance was widely recognized, winning an array of trophies including the Golden Lion Award for Performance, the award for Excellent Performance at the 8th Cao Yu Drama Award, and the Best Leading Actress of the 5th Shanghai Magnolia Award.

Yin's subsequent performances in TV series The Sky of History, and Catching the Wrong Bus brought her into the limelight. She also won the Outstanding Actress Award at the 23rd Golden Eagle Awards for her performance as A-mei in Catching the Wrong Bus.

In 2007, Yin starred in the military romance drama Happiness As Flowers. She received a Flying Apsaras Award nomination for Best Actress.

In 2008, Yin starred in The Woman's Lifetime, and was nominated for the Best Actress Award at the 14th Shanghai Television Festival. She also as the torch bearer in the 2008 Beijing Olympic Games.

In 2009, she starred in two hit television series In a Land Far Faraway and The Prominent Clan. Both shows earned high ratings and won accolades from critics and TV viewers. The same year, Yin co-starred with Anthony Wong in the historical television series The Legend of Yang Guifei. Playing Yang Guifei, one of the Four Beauties of ancient China. Yin’s natural beauty and consummate acting skill demonstrated in this show pushed her acting career to a new level.

In 2010, she starred in historical drama The Firmament of The Pleiades, which became the first television series from China to be screened on Japan's NHK at prime time. Yin impressed viewers with her refined performance that the Japanese viewers have dubbed her "Chinese Aurora".

In 2011, Yin starred in the historical television series Secret History of Empress Wu, playing the titular role Wu Zetian. The drama received positive reviews.

In 2013, Yin won the Outstanding Actress Award at the 29th Flying Apsaras Awards for her roles in Family on the Go and The Love in Yan'an. That same year, Yin featured in action film Police Story 2013, starring alongside Jackie Chan.

In 2017, Yin won Magnolia Award for Best Actress in a Television Series for her performance in Feather Flies to the Sky. The same year, she was cast alongside Huang Xiaoming in the television series The Years You Were Late.

In 2020, Yin served as one of jury members for the Chinese TV Series of the TV Series category of the Magnolia Awards.

== Personal life ==
In 2004, Yin married Shen Juncheng (沈俊成), general manager of a communication company in Chongqing, and divorced the following year. In 2009, she met a wealthy businessman named Sun Donghai (孙东海) while filming The Legend of Yang Guifei, and the two broke up in 2010. Yin and Li Guangjie fell in love while filming the drama Romeo and Juliet, but later broke up. In 2015, she was introduced to football player Li Jinyu, and the two broke up in 2017. In March 2019, Yin's friend Huang Xiaolei introduced her to actor Zhao Da, and they broke up in October 2020.

== Filmography ==
=== Film ===
Year	English title	Chinese title	Role	Notes/Ref.
2004	Red Banderole	红飘带	Shan Shan	
2005	Intel Younger	网络少年	Suo Lala	
2012	Today and Tomorrow	今天明天		Voice-dubbed
2013	Police Story 2013	警察故事2013	Landlady	
2015	La Historia Du Un Amor	临时演员	Lu Yijing	
2017	Mr. No Problem	不成问题的问题	Mrs You	
2018	Goddesses in the Flames of War	那些女人	Hui	
2021	Sunny Sisters	阳光姐妹淘	Zhang Lijun	
2021	1921	1921	Wen Suqin	
2022	Home Coming	万里归途	Bai Hua	

=== Television series ===
Year	English title	Chinese title	Role	Ref.
1996	The 30 Years Old Woman	女人三十	Ping Ping	
1999		空了吹	Yu Dandan	
2002		寡妇堤	Tong Cao	
2002	The Housewife	围屋里的女人	Dou Miao	
2003	Red Detachment of Women	红色娘子军	Wu Qionghua	
2003	The Sky of History	历史的天空	Dongfang Wenying	
2004	Catching the Wrong Bus	搭错车	A Mei	
2005	Part Ten	局中局	Lu Lanlan	
2005	Happiness As Flowers	幸福像花儿一样	Da Mei	
2005	Vertical Attack	垂直打击	Gu Xiaonan	
2005	The True Love of Time	真情年代	Fan Xiaojie	
2006	The Woman's Lifetime	女人一辈子	Tao Xiaotao	
2006		狼烟	Zhao Chuchu	
2006	Last Night Stars	新昨夜星辰	A Xiang	
2006	Broken and Scattered	爱了散了	Dong Xiaohan	
2006	Peach Blossoming	桃花灿烂	Shui Xiang	
2007	Police Story	警察故事	Chang Jia	
2007	Big Pearl	大珍珠	Bai Yongyun	
2007	The Story of Medical Team	卫生队的故事	Yin	
2008	In a Land Far Faraway	在那遥远的地方	Yuan Ying	
2008	Highland	高地	Yang Tao	
2008	The Prominent Clan	望族	Wang Yuqiu	
2008	The East Is Red 1949	东方红1949	Gu Zhengfan/ Gu Zhenghan	
2009	The Legend of Yang Guifei	杨贵妃秘史	Yang Guifei	
2009	Eagles Battalion	鹰隼大队	Jiang Jingchao	
2010	The Firmament of The Pleiades	苍穹之昴	Wife Zhang	
2011	The Love in Yan'an	延安爱情	Su Zhen	
2011	Secret History of Empress Wu	武则天秘史	Wu Zetian	
2011	The Marriage of My Mother	我和老妈一起嫁	Zhang Shihe	
2012	The Fashion Editor	时尚女编辑	Cheng Xin	
2012	Women in the Battlefield	战地花开	Duan Siqi	
2012	Family On the Go	温州一家人	Zhou A'yu	
2012	No. 19 Huangliang Hutong	皇粮胡同十九号	Guanyue Liangzi	
2013	The Story of Soldier Students 2	大学生士兵的故事2	Assistant Yin	
2013	Without Thieves	无贼	Qiao An'na	
2014	If Happiness Comes	假如幸福来临	Ye Baihe	
2015	Exceedingly High Road	大道通天	Xia Yuanyuan	
2015		我为儿孙当北漂	Tian Beilei	
2015	Legend of the Song	大宋传奇之赵匡胤	Wang Yuehong	
2015	The Blood Chit	生死血符		
2015	The Cloud's Time of Flying	白云飘飘的年代		
2016	People's Prosecutor	人民检察官	Xia Jingru	
2017	Feather Flies To The Sky	鸡毛飞上天	Luo Yuzhu	
2018	Frontier of Love	爱情的边疆	Wen Yiqiu	
2018	The Years You Were Late	你迟到的许多年	Mo Li	
2021	Fighting Youth	正青春	Lin Rui	
2021	Brilliant Girls	爱的理想生活	Wen Ruxue	
2022	As We Wish	幸福二重奏	Liao Sha	
2022	A Lifelong Journey	人世间	Zhen Juan	
2023	Viva Femina	耀眼的你啊	Kang Ziyou	
2024	As Husband, As Wife	小夫妻	Che Li	
2024	Born to be the One	凡人歌	Shen Lin	

=== Theater ===
Year	English title	Chinese title	Role	Ref.
2003	Wait for You in Paradise	我在天堂等你	Bai Xuemei	
2009	The Army Rose	雷霆玫瑰	Zhao Mei	
2010	The Yellow Storm	四世同堂	Guan Zhaodi	
2011	Flying	起飞	Qi Lingyan	
2014	Romeo & Juliet	罗密欧与朱丽叶	Juliet	

== Awards and nominations ==
Year	Award	Category	Nominated work	Results	Ref.
2003	12th Wenbiao Award	Performance Award	I Will Wait for You in the Heaven	Won	
2003	5th Chinese Drama Golden Lion Award	Performance Award	I Will Wait for You in the Heaven	Won	
2003	8th Cao Yu Drama Award	Outstanding Performance Award	I Will Wait for You in the Heaven	Won	
2003	15th Shanghai Magnolia Drama Performance Art Award	Best Actress	I Will Wait for You in the Heaven	Won	
2006	23rd China TV Golden Eagle Award	Audience's Choice for Actress	I Take the Wrong Bus	Won	
2007	26th Flying Apsaras Award	Outstanding Actress	Happiness As Flowers	Nominated	
2008	14th Shanghai Television Festival	Best Actress	The Woman's Lifetime	Nominated	
2009	27th Flying Apsaras Award	Outstanding Contribution Award	—N/a	Won	
2013	29th Flying Apsaras Award	Outstanding Actress	The Love in Yan'an, Family on the Go	Won	
2017	23rd Shanghai Television Festival	Best Actress	Feather Flies To The Sky	Won	
2018	9th China Film Director's Guild Awards	Best Actress	Mr. No Problem	Nominated	
2018	31st Flying Apsaras Award	Outstanding Actress	Feather Flies To The Sky	Nominated	
2018	29th China TV Golden Eagle Award	Best Actress	Feather Flies To The Sky	Nominated	
2019	6th The Actors of China Award Ceremony	Best Actress (Sapphire Category)	The Years You Were Late	Nominated	
2019	1978 Excellence Awards	Best Actress	—N/a	Won	
2019	15th Sichuan Television Festival	Best Actress	Feather Flies To The Sky	Won	
2022	31st China TV Golden Eagle Award	Best Actress	A Lifelong Journey	Won	
2023	28th Shanghai Television Festival	Best Actress	A Lifelong Journey	Nominated	
2023	16th Asian Film Awards	Best Supporting Actress	Home Coming	Nominated	
