= My Best Friend's Story =

2020 Chinese drama television series

- Promotional poster
- Chinese: 流金岁月
- Hanyu Pinyin: Liú jīn suìyuè
- Genre: Womance; Drama; Family
- Based on: The Golden Years (流金岁月) by Yi Shu
- Written by: Qin Wen
- Directed by: Shen Yan
- Starring: Liu Shishi; Ni Ni
- Country of origin: China
- Original language: Mandarin
- No. of seasons: 1
- No. of episodes: 38

Production
- Executive producers: Zhuang Dianjun; Wang Xiaohui; Xu Jia
- Production location: Shanghai
- Production companies: New Classics Media iQIYI; Tomorrow Film; Ju Zheng Ying Ye

Original release
- Network: CCTV-8 iQIYI
- Release: December 28, 2020 – January 15, 2021

Related
- Last Romance (1988 Hong Kong film) directed by Yonfan

My Best Friend's Story (Chinese: 流金岁月) is a 2020 Chinese drama television series directed by Shen Yan and starring Ni Ni and Liu Shishi. It is adapted from the novel The Golden Years (流金岁月) written by Yi Shu. The series follows the story of a friendship between two women who forged a close childhood bond through periods of success and failure. The series aired on CCTV-8 and iQIYI from 28 December 2020 to 15 January 2021.

== Plot ==
Jiang Nansun and Zhu Suosuo were born into two completely opposite families. They have known each other since they were very young and spent a carefree childhood with each other. Jiang Nansun is a daughter who was born with a golden spoon. Although she was a good girl since she was a child, there is a rebellious power hidden in her heart. Zhu Suosuo grew up in a broken family, and she has a strong desire for marriage and family.

The dual changes of family and love left Jiang Nansun at a loss. At this moment, Zhu Suosuo stepped forward and took in Jiang Nansun, who had nowhere to go. With Zhu Suosuo's help, Jiang Nansun completed her studies and entered the workplace. However, Zhu Suosuo, who finally got married, suffered an emotional change after her marriage. At this time, Jiang Nansun gradually matures in thought and perception. The two girls supported each other and healed each other.

== Cast ==
=== Main ===
- Liu Shishi as Jiang Nansun
  - Han Xitong as Jiang Nansun (young)
- Ni Ni as Zhu Suosuo
  - Yang Kexin as Zhu Suosuo (young)
- Dong Zijian as Xie Hongzu, Zhu Suosuo's husband
- Tian Yu as Fan Jingang, Ye Jinyan's assistant
- Wang Xiao as Yang Ke
- Tony Yang as Wang Yongzheng
- Eric Yang Le as Zhang Anren
- Chen Daoming as Ye Jinyan

=== Supporting ===
- Yuan Quan as Dai Xi Daisy, Jiang Nan Sun's aunt
- He Hongshan as Yuan Yuan
- Wu Yue as Qi Xin
- Yu Xiaowei as Li Yifan
- Chang Chen-kuang as Mr. Jiang
- Wang Lin as Xie Jianan
- Yang Xinming as Professor Dong
- Tan Kai as Zhu Suosuo's father
- Wu Yanshu as Granny Jiang
- Guo Yang as Li Lian
- Wu Yufang as Mrs. Jiang
- Wang Yuanda as Xiao He
- Qu Zheming as Luo Jiaming
- Shi An as Li Ang
- Hou Changrong as Uncle
- Zhu Yin as Aunt
- Tong Yue as Mr. Ma
- Shi Yueling as Manager Pan
- Feng Hui as Bao Luo
- Tom Price as Ai Dehua
- Zhu Zhu as Female Customer
- Huang Zhenghao as Fei Yuqing
- Ma Ye La Ma Ge Lu as Ma Yila
- Jin Feng as Ai Bo Er
- Guo Tongtong as Zhou Qing
- Rong Fei as Tony
- Rong Zixi as Zhao Malin
- Zhao Yang as Da Luo
- Ke Yu as Nan Fang
- Sun Qiang as Wang Feiyu
- Chang Di as Xiao Yu
- Cao Lei as Xiao Ding

== Ratings ==
- Highest ratings are marked in red, lowest ratings are marked in blue

Broadcast date	Episode #	CCTV-8 CSM59 network ratings		
Broadcast date	Episode #	Ratings (%)	Audience share (%)	Rank
2020.12.28	1-2	0.521	1.798	11
2020.12.29	3-4	0.539	1.791	11
2020.12.30	5-6	0.528	1.767	11
2020.12.31	7-8	0.473	1.469	3
2021.1.1	9-10	0.714	2.492	3
2021.1.2	11-12	0.593	1.933	8
2021.1.3	13-14	0.723	2.336	7
2021.1.4	15-16	0.717	2.388	7
2021.1.5	17-18	0.691	2.283	7
2021.1.6	19-20	0.689	2.248	7
2021.1.7	21-22	0.702	2.253	7
2021.1.8	23-24	0.754	2.355	6
2021.1.9	25-26	0.834	2.630	5
2021.1.10	27-28	0.854	2.657	6
2021.1.11	29-30	0.754	2.432	9
2021.1.12	31-32	0.817	2.709	9
2021.1.13	33-34	0.843	2.799	8
2021.1.14	35-36	0.899	2.958	9
2021.1.15	37-38	0.860	2.757	9

== Awards and nominations ==
Award	Category	Nominated work	Result	Ref.
27th Shanghai Television Festival	Best Television Series	My Best Friend's Story	Nominated	
27th Shanghai Television Festival	Best Director	Shen Yan	Nominated	
27th Shanghai Television Festival	Best Adapted Screenplay	Qin Wen	Nominated	
27th Shanghai Television Festival	Best Actress	Ni Ni	Nominated	
27th Shanghai Television Festival	Best Art Direction	Di Kun	Won	
26th Asian Television Awards	Best Drama Series	My Best Friend's Story	Nominated	
33rd Flying Apsaras Awards	Outstanding Television Series	My Best Friend's Story	Nominated	
