= Sun Li (actress) =

Chinese actress

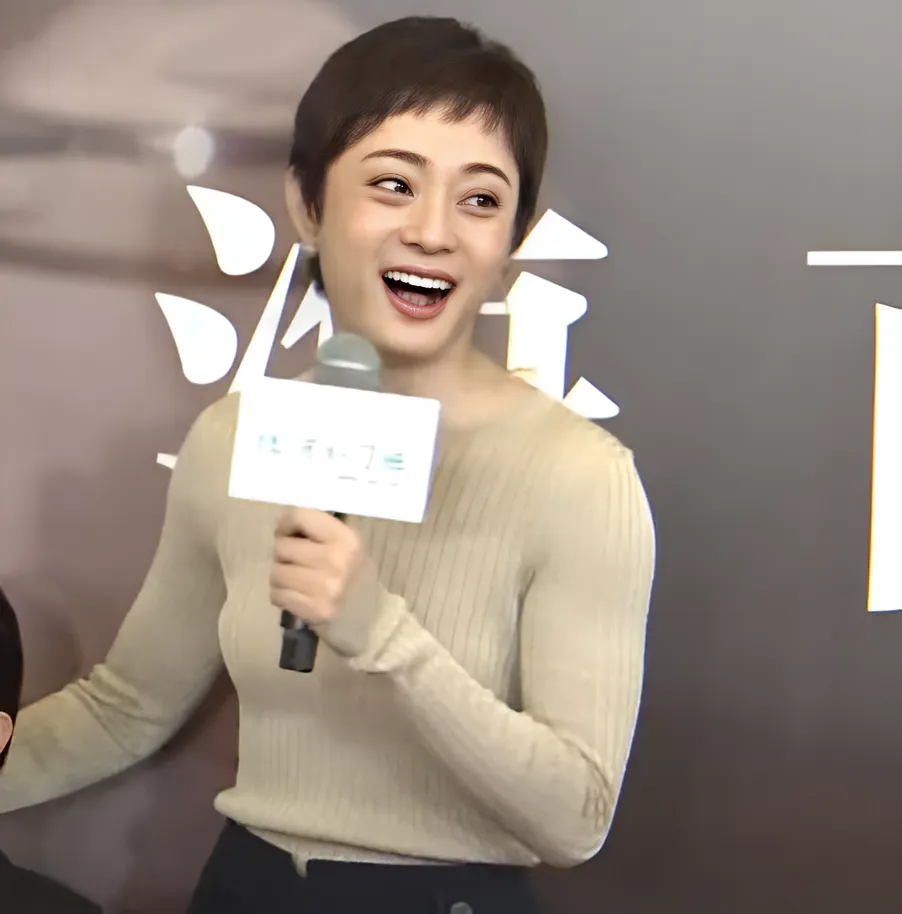
- Sun in July 2019
- Born: 26 September 1982 (age 44); Shanghai, China
- Education: Shanghai Oriental Culture College
- Occupations: Actress, singer
- Years active: 2001–present
- Agent: Hairun Media
- Spouse: Deng Chao (m. 2010)
- Children: 2

Chinese name
- Traditional Chinese: 孫儷
- Simplified Chinese: 孙俪
Transcriptions
Standard Mandarin
- Hanyu Pinyin: Sūn Lì

Sun Li (Chinese: 孙俪, born 26 September 1982), also known as Susan Sun, (Note: Her English name is sometimes misreported as Betty or Turbo.) is a Chinese actress, best known for TV dramas such as Goddess of Mercy (2003), Happiness as Flowers (2005), Shanghai Bund (2007), Empresses in the Palace (2011), The Legend of Mi Yue (2015), and Nothing Gold Can Stay (2017). Her films include Painted Skin (2008), The Breakup Guru (2014), Devil and Angel (2015), and Shadow (2018). In 2018, she became the youngest actress to achieve China's television "Grand Slam", having won Best Actress at the country's three major TV awards: Flying Apsaras Awards, Golden Eagle Awards, and Magnolia Awards.

== Career ==
=== 2001–2010: Early work and breakthrough ===
Sun first entered show business by participating in 2001's Star Search, held by Singapore's MediaCorp. She reached the finals and earned the praise of judge Andy Lau. Following the competition, Sun joined Hairun Media as their first flagship artist.

In 2003, author and TV producer Hai Yan selected her for the female lead in the television series Goddess of Mercy. Sun received overwhelmingly positive feedback from audiences for her portrayal of An Xin, and rose to fame in China as one of the most promising young actresses.

In 2006, Sun won the Best Newcomer award at the 28th Hundred Flowers Awards for her performance in Huo Yuanjia co-starring Jet Li. She then starred alongside Huang Xiaoming in Shanghai Bund (2007), a mainland remake of the 1980 television series The Bund.

Sun starred in Gordon Chan's horror-adventure film Painted Skin (2008), and was nominated for the Best Supporting Actress award for her performance as a young and inexperienced demon hunter at numerous award ceremonies. The same year, she starred in Gao Xixi's military-romance drama Tian Mi Mi. The series was chosen by the Chinese Radio & Television Association as one of the Top Ten television series of the year.

Sun then starred in Iron Road (2009), the second joint venture created under Canada/China co-production treaty established in the 1960s. She plays a poor Chinese girl in search of her father who works at a railroad in North America, and challenged speaking in English for the film. For her performance, Sun was crowned Best Actress at the 2nd Roma FictionFest and the 25th Gemini Awards. The same year, Sun played the title character in the television series, Auntie Duohe, based on the novel of the same name by acclaimed writer Geling Yan.

=== 2011–2016: Widespread recognition and success ===
In 2011, Sun gained widespread recognition by playing Zhen Huan in the critically acclaimed historical drama, Empresses in the Palace. She was nominated for an International Emmy Award in the Best Actress category for her role. Praised for being one of the best historical dramas in China, the series garnered high ratings throughout its run and also sparked trends in dialogue quotes and plastic surgery. The same year, she reunited with Painted Skin director Gordan Chan in Mural (also known as Painted Skin 2). She also starred in martial arts film The Lost Bladesman alongside Donnie Yen and Jiang Wen.

For her role as an independent mother in Hot Mom! (2013), Sun won the Best Actress award at the 20th Shanghai Television Festival. She also won the Most Popular Actress award at the 10th China Golden Eagle TV Arts Festival.

In 2015, Sun played Queen Dowager Xuan, the first stateswoman in China, in historical drama The Legend of Mi Yue. The series was a commercial success, and recorded the highest ratings of the year. Sun won her second Best Actress trophy at the 22nd Shanghai Television Festival. The same year, Sun challenged her first comedy role in Devil and Angel, directed by her husband Deng Chao.

In 2017, Sun played the lead character in the period drama Nothing Gold Can Stay, based on a real-life story of Zhou Ying, a budding businesswoman who takes on the responsibilities from her dead husband and starts rebuilding their business empire from scratch. For her performance in the role, Sun was awarded the Outstanding Actress award at the Flying Apsaras Awards.

In 2018, Sun starred in Zhang Yimou's historical film, Shadow as the female lead. She was nominated in the Best Actress category at the Golden Horse Awards for her performance.

In 2019, Sun was cast in the drama I Will Find You a Better Home as a star property agent, and was nominated for the Best Actress award at the Shanghai Television Festival.

In 2020, Sun starred in the urban drama An Jia (House of Rebirth). In 2021, the workplace drama The Ideal City, in which he starred, was aired.

== Personal life ==
Sun and actor Deng Chao registered their marriage in 2010 and held an official wedding ceremony in 2011 when she was five months pregnant. They have two children, a son and a daughter.

She has a half sister, Sun Yan, who is also an actress, who is 19 years younger than Sun Li.

== Social activities ==
=== Charity work ===
In 2006, Sun took promotional photos for charity and released the single CD Love Like Air. In May, she became the ambassador for the Angel Sunshine Action. In September, at the invitation of the Lijiang Municipal Government, she served as the Lijiang City Ambassador.

In 2010, Sun participated in the anti-fur charity campaign, shooting a public service advertisement titled "Transform into an Angel, Reject Fur".

On 31 January 2018, China Charity magazine revealed the 2017 China Charity Celebrity List, and Sun ranked 24th.

== Filmography ==
=== Film ===
Year	Title	Role	Notes	Ref.
2006	Fearless	Yue Ci (Moon)		
2008	Painted Skin	Xia Bing		
2009	Iron Road	Little Tiger		
2009	Kung Fu Cyborg	Zhou Sumei		
2010	Just Another Pandora's Box	Rose		
2011	The Lost Bladesman	Qilan		
2011	Mural	Shao Yao		
2014	Just Another Margin	Jin Ling		
2014	The Breakup Guru	Herself		Cameo
2015	Devil and Angel	Zha Xiaodao		
2018	Shadow	Xiao'ai		
2020	My People My Homeland 我和我的家乡	Stewardess		
2023	Ping Pong: The Triumph	Wang Ying		

=== Television series ===
Year	Title	Role	Notes	Ref.
2001	Romance in the Rain	Dancer		
2003	Goddess of Mercy 玉观音	An Xin		
2003	Yi Shuang Xiu Hua Xie 一双绣花鞋	Lin Ying		
2004	A Ray of Sunshine 一米阳光	Yi Aiyuan/Yi Chuanxia		
2004	Hong Fen Shi Jia 红粉世家	Yao Zhi		
2004	Crimson Romance 血色浪漫	Zhou Xiaobai		
2005	Feng Yu Xi Guan 风雨西关	Xie Tianhui		
2005	Days and a Bureau 天和局	Zhu Wanqiu		
2005	Happiness as Flowers 幸福像花儿一样	Du Juan		
2005	Emerald on the Roof	Mo Jiaqi		
2007	Shanghai Bund	Feng Chengcheng		
2007	Yi Shi Qing Yuan 一世情缘	Ji Wen		
2008	Tian Mi Mi 甜蜜蜜	Ye Qing		
2009	Auntie Duohe 小姨多鹤	Duo He		
2011	The Legend of Zhen Huan	Zhen Huan		
2013	Hot Mom! 辣妈正传	Xia Bing		
2015	The Legend of Mi Yue	Mi Yue		
2017	Nothing Gold Can Stay	Zhou Ying		
2020	I Will Find You a Better Home	Fang Sijin		
2020	Together 在一起	Fang Zhuren		
2021	Medal of the Republic	Wei Suping		
2021	The Ideal City 理想之城	Su Xiao		
2025	A Better Life	Hu Manli		

== Discography ==
=== Albums ===
Year	Title	Notes	Ref.
2006	Love is Like the Air 爱如空气		
2008	A Little Dream 小小的梦想		
2010	Beautiful Signal 美俪暗号		

=== Singles ===
Year	English title	Chinese title	Album	Notes
2003	"Happier Than Me"	比我幸福	Goddess of Mercy OST	
2006	"Even If There is No Tomorrow"	就算没有明天	Shanghai Bund OST	with Huang Xiaoming
2007	"The Moon Represents My Heart"		Tian Mi Mi OST	with Deng Chao
2009	"Memory"	记忆	Kungfu Cyborg OST	with Alex Fong
2010	"Slowly Be Happy"	慢慢快乐	—N/a	with Mo Yan Lin
2011	"Mural"	画壁	Mural OST	with Deng Chao
2013	"A Stable Happiness"	稳稳的幸福	Hot Mom OST	with Zhang Yi
2013	"How Can You Bear to Hurt Me"	你怎么舍得伤害我	—N/a	Charity song; with Gigi Leung & Valen Hsu
2017	"Can't Forget"	忘不掉	Nothing Gold Can Stay OST	

== Awards and nominations ==
Year	Award	Category	Nominated work	Result	Ref.
2004	24th Flying Apsaras Awards	Outstanding Actress	Goddess of Mercy	Nominated	
2004	22nd China TV Golden Eagle Award	Audience's Choice for Actress	Goddess of Mercy	Won	
2004	22nd China TV Golden Eagle Award	Most Popular Actress	Goddess of Mercy	Won	
2005	14th Chunyan Awards	Best Actress	Goddess of Mercy	Won	
2006	28th Hundred Flowers Awards	Best Newcomer	Fearless	Won	
2007	2nd Hong Kong Film Directors' Guild Awards	Best Newcomer	Fearless	Won	
2007	26th Hong Kong Film Awards	Best New Performer	Fearless	Nominated	
2007	13th Shanghai Television Festival	Best Actress	Shanghai Bund	Nominated	
2007	26th Flying Apsaras Awards	Outstanding Actress	Happiness as Flowers	Nominated	
2008	2nd Roma FictionFest	Best Actress	Iron Road	Won	
2008	24th China TV Golden Eagle Award	Audience's Choice for Actress	Yi Shi Qing Yuan	Nominated	
2009	27th Flying Apsaras Awards	60th Anniversary Outstanding Contribution Award	—N/a	Won	
2009	28th Hong Kong Film Awards	Best Supporting Actress	Painted Skin	Nominated	
2009	2nd Iron Elephant Film Awards	Best Supporting Actress	Painted Skin	Nominated	
2009	27th Golden Rooster Awards	Best Supporting Actress	Painted Skin	Nominated	
2010	30th Hundred Flowers Awards	Best Supporting Actress	Painted Skin	Nominated	
2010	25th Gemini Awards	Best Performance by an Actress in a Leading Role in a Dramatic Program or Mini-Series	Iron Road	Won	
2011	3rd Macau International Movie Festival	Best Actress	The Lost Bladesman	Nominated	
2012	18th Shanghai Television Festival	Best Actress	Empresses in the Palace	Nominated	
2012	3rd Macau International Television Festival	Best Actress	Empresses in the Palace	Won	
2012	4th China TV Drama Awards	Best Actress	Empresses in the Palace	Won	
2013	41st International Emmy Awards	Best Actress	Empresses in the Palace	Nominated	
2014	2nd Asia Rainbow TV Awards	Best Actress	Empresses in the Palace	Won	
2014	20th Shanghai Television Festival	Best Actress	Hot Mom!	Won	
2014	13th Huading Awards	Best Actress	Hot Mom!	Nominated	
2014	27th China TV Golden Eagle Award	Audience's Choice for Actress	Hot Mom!	Won	
2014	27th China TV Golden Eagle Award	Most Popular Actress	Hot Mom!	Won	
2016	22nd Shanghai Television Festival	Best Actress	The Legend of Mi Yue	Won	
2016	3rd Asia Rainbow TV Awards	Best Actress (Ancient Drama)	The Legend of Mi Yue	Nominated	
2018	31st Flying Apsaras Awards	Outstanding Actress	Nothing Gold Can Stay	Won	
2018	24th Shanghai Television Festival	Best Actress	Nothing Gold Can Stay	Nominated	
2018	29th China TV Golden Eagle Award	Best Actress	Nothing Gold Can Stay	Nominated	
2018	55th Golden Horse Film Festival and Awards	Best Leading Actress	Shadow	Nominated	
2020	26th Shanghai Television Festival	Best Actress	I Will Find You a Better Home	Nominated	
2020	30th China TV Golden Eagle Award	Best Actress	I Will Find You a Better Home	Nominated	
2020	30th China TV Golden Eagle Award	Audience's Choice for Actress	I Will Find You a Better Home	Nominated	
2020	7th The Actors of China Award Ceremony	Best Actress (Sapphire)	—N/a	Nominated	
2022	33rd Flying Apsaras Awards	Outstanding Actress	The Ideal City	Nominated	
2023	28th Shanghai Television Festival	Best Actress	The Ideal City	Nominated	
2026	4th CMG Annual Chinese TV Drama Ceremony	Actress of the Year	A Better Life	Won	

=== Forbes China Celebrity 100 ===
Year	Rank	Ref.
2013	22nd	
2014	30th	
2015	6th	
2017	13th	
2019	22nd	
2020	25th	
