= Gao Xin (actor) =

Chinese actor (born 1976)

- 高鑫
- Born: Gao Hongxian; December 11, 1976 (age 49); Beijing, China
- Education: Beijing Film Academy
- Occupation: Actor
- Years active: 1996–present
- Spouse: Wang Yi'nan (m. 2007)
- Children: 1

Gao Xin (Chinese: 高鑫; pinyin: Gāo Xīn; born 11 December 1976) is a Chinese television and film actor. He gained national attention as Lu Erhao in the Chiung Yao drama Romance in the Rain (2001), winning the Golden Bell Award for Best Newcomer. Subsequent high‑profile turns include Crown Prince Xiao Jingxuan in Nirvana in Fire (2015) and the controversial elder brother Su Mingzhe in the family hit All Is Well (2019). Gao was nominated for Best Supporting Actor at the 25th Shanghai Television Festival for the latter role. In 2022, he headlined the rural‑revitalization series Spring Breeze Green Jiangnan as county secretary Yan Donglei.

== Early life and education ==
Gao was born in Beijing in 1976 and graduated from the Acting Department of the Beijing Film Academy in 1998.

== Career ==
=== 1996–2000: Debut years ===
Gao made his screen debut in the children’s series Sanmao Wanderings (1996) and appeared in the romance film Ten‑Day Love (1997). Early supporting parts culminated in his casting by novelist‑producer Chiung Yao for Romance in the Rain.

=== 2001–2015: Recognition and character roles ===
Romance in the Rain established him as a popular second‑generation leading man, and Gao spent the next decade alternating period and espionage dramas such as Battle of Changsha (2014) and All Quiet in Peking (2014). His performance as the scheming Crown Prince in Nirvana in Fire (2015) was singled out by critics for its intensity.

=== 2019–present: Mainstream popularity ===
The social‑realist hit All Is Well (2019) became a cultural phenomenon; analysis pieces in *People’s Daily* and *Beijing News* dissected Gao’s “love‑to‑hate” character. He followed with the corporate thriller People’s Property (2021) and the rural‑governance drama Spring Breeze Green Jiangnan (2022). Upcoming projects include the legal series Hold a Court Now and psychological suspense drama Dreamcatcher.

== Personal life ==
Gao married actress Wang Yi'nan in July 2007 after a 10‑year relationship; the couple have one daughter and are often cited for maintaining a low‑key, enduring partnership.

== Filmography ==
=== Television series ===
Year	Title	Role	Notes
1996	Sanmao Wanderings	Unknown	
1998	Love Hamburger	Chen Hao	
1998	Sanmao Wanderings II	Lin Chongren	
2000	Life Is Beautiful Because of You	Yu Tianlei	
2001	Romance in the Rain	Lu Erhao	Breakthrough
2001	Grassroots Magistrate	Fifteenth Prince	
2002	Flying Daggers	Zhao Chuan / Zhao Sha	
2002	Angry Butterfly	Han Lunxi	
2003	Worry-free Princess	Wu Ming	
2003	Happy Zhu Bajie	Zhu Bajie / Zhu Fengchun	
2004	Blood Oath	Chu Bin	
2004	Xiang Qi Mi Ren	Fang Gang	
2004	Sword of Legends	Liu Feiteng	
2004	Brown Canna	He Ye	
2004	Heavy-Money Defense	A-Xin	
2005	New Drunken Imperial Concubine	Li Quan	
2005	Legend of Yin–Shang	Ha Lun	
2006	Destined Love	Emperor	
2006	Evening Sunshine at Ming Palace	Pei Wenzhong	
2007	A Just Official Settles Family Affairs	Xing Gang	
2007	Legend of Tie Guan Yin	Wang Shilang	
2008	True-Heart Hero	Ji Xiaonuan	
2010	Entangling Love in Shanghai	Zhang Guiting	
2011	Love Me Again	Li Shilin	
2011	Son-in-law in Trouble	Zeng Zhiqiang	
2012	Happy Marshal	Jade Emperor	
2012	Butterfly Operation	Chen Jiu	
2013	The Distance to Love	Wei Tianshu	
2013	Da Ming Detective Story	Yu Renjie	
2014	Battle of Changsha	Liu Minghan	
2014	All Quiet in Peking	Zhang Yueyin	
2015	Nirvana in Fire	Crown Prince Xiao Jingxuan	
2015	The Disguiser	Zhang Yueyin	
2015	Midnight Taxi 2	Cameo	
2015	Hong Kong Daughter-in-law Comes	Li Wenxuan	
2016	Hunter	Qin Tianming	
2016	Full House of Happiness	Du Siyuan	
2016	Through the Mystery	Hao Hao	
2017	Razor	Lin Sen	
2017	Emergency Department Doctors	Zhang Zhang	
2017	Healing Master	Jiang Moran	
2017	Surgeons	Young Xiu Minqi	
2018	Bloody Romance	Chen Mo	
2019	All Is Well	Su Mingzhe	Shanghai TV Festival nomination
2019	Take Us Home	Zheng Hong	
2021	Octogenarian and the 90s	Guo Tielin	
2021	People’s Property	Pi Dan	
2022	Spring Breeze Green Jiangnan	Yan Donglei	
2022	She and Her Perfect Husband	Qin Wenbin	
2022	Lady of Law	Jian Peiran	
2022	Glory of Special Forces	Qin Feng	
2022	Mom Wow	Tian Siyang	
2023	The White Castle	Zu Wenda	
2023	Prosecution Elite	Zhao Jikai	
2023	Dragon City	Zheng Hong	
2024	Scout Hero	Shen Yuanzhang	
2024	Go! Beach Volleyball Girls	Coach	
2024	Po Mi	Lin Chenhan	
2024	Ode to Joy 5	Qian Keduo	
2025	A Better Life	Ding Zhiyuan	
TBA	Hold a Court Now	TBA	
TBA	Dreamcatcher	Lin Xun	
TBA	Hero Legends	Wu Dingyuan	

=== Feature films ===
Year	Title	Role
2000	Crash Landing	Xiao Fei
2000	Pretty Mom	Supporting
2006	Shanghai Rumba	Chen Hanting
2011	Case Sensitive	Luo Su
2011	Reviving of Beichuan	Sun Xuelin
