= Nothing Gold Can Stay (TV series) =

- Drama poster

Chinese name
- Traditional Chinese: 那年花開月正圓
- Simplified Chinese: 那年花开月正圆
Transcriptions
Standard Mandarin
- Hanyu Pinyin: Nànián Huākaī Yuèzhèngyuán
- Genre: Historical fiction Business; Romance
- Written by: Su Xiaoyuan
- Directed by: Ding Hei
- Starring: Sun Li; Chen Xiao; Peter Ho; Ren Zhong; Myolie Wu; Yu Haoming
- Opening theme: Can't Forget by Sun Li
- Ending theme: Walking in the Midst of Moonlight by Tan Weiwei
- Country of origin: China
- Original language: Chinese
- No. of seasons: 1
- No. of episodes: 74

Production
- Producer: Zhao Yi
- Running time: 45 mins
- Production company: HS Entertainment Group Incorporated

Original release
- Network: Dragon TV, Jiangsu TV
- Release: August 30 – October 8, 2017

Nothing Gold Can Stay (Chinese: 那年花开月正圆) is a 2017 Chinese television series directed by Ding Hei and starring Sun Li, Chen Xiao and Peter Ho. Based on the real-life story of a businesswoman from Shaanxi in the late Qing dynasty, the series aired on Dragon TV and Jiangsu TV from 30 August 2017 to 8 October 2017.

== Background ==
The series is based on the real-life story of a businesswoman from Anwubao, Jingyang County, Shaanxi Province, during the late Qing dynasty. Her real name is unknown, as women’s names were typically omitted from Chinese historiography. In unofficial accounts, she is sometimes recorded as Zhou Ying, a name adopted by the series. According to legend, after taking over her late husband’s family business, she became one of the richest women in China, and later became a goddaughter of Empress Dowager Cixi.

== Synopsis ==
Zhou Ying is sold to the powerful Shen family by her foster father, yet successfully escapes her childish and bratty master Shen Xingyi by sneaking into merchant Wu Pin's palanquin. After a failed business collaboration that resulted in Shen Yuesheng's (Xingyi's older brother) death, the Shen family suspects that Wu Pin was the culprit behind Yuesheng's death. Xingyi then injures Wu Pin by using a club to hit his forehead multiple times, causing Wu Pin to fall into a coma. After the bride-to-be's father has a last-minute change of heart, Zhou Ying is married to Wu Pin in an effort to dispel bad luck. Miraculously, Wu Pin wakes up on the same night, and the couple share a happy few months together. Wu Weiwen, the patriarch of the family also agrees to educate her in the matters of commerce after witnessing her remarkable business acumen.

Unfortunately, Wu Pin is poisoned to death after getting too close to the truth of the failed business collaboration, and Wu Weiwen's imprisonment and death a couple of months later leaves the entire household in disarray. Zhou Ying is determined to turn around their fortune by investing in a cloth factory in Shaanxi. She gains the trust of the Wu family and starts from scratch. Meanwhile, Shen Xingyi has also decided to turn over a new leaf, and starts anew in Shanghai. Shen Xingyi's love for Zhou Ying is initially unrequited, though she eventually acknowledges that she has developed romantic feelings for him. However, romantic affections become of little importance in the face of political upheaval and personal revenge – Shen Xingyi joins the anti-Qing reformist movement and plots to kill the Empress Dowager Cixi while Zhou Ying avenges Wu Pin and her father-in-law's deaths by taking Shen Sihai and Du Mingli head on. After much struggle, Zhou Ying ultimately establishes a business empire, and also lends Empress Dowager Cixi a helping hand when she escapes to Jingyang.

== Cast ==
=== Main ===
- Sun Li as Zhou Ying (周莹)
  - A budding businesswoman who initially marries into the Wu Family to ward off bad luck. After her husband dies, she takes on his responsibilities and starts rebuilding their business empire from scratch.
- Chen Xiao as Shen Xingyi (沈星移)
  - A happy-go-lucky young master who has never known hardship in his life. After meeting Zhou Ying, he eventually decides to change his ways, becoming an educated businessman and later an advocate for modernization who is willing to die to protect his country and loved ones.
- Peter Ho as Wu Pin (吴聘)
  - Young master of the eastern courtyard in the Wu household, a kind and gentle businessman who is the first person to treat Zhou Ying for who she is, and respect her opinions.
- Ren Zhong as Zhao Baishi (赵白石)
  - An upright and conservative county magistrate who remains loyal to his people. He has an unrequited love for Zhou Ying.
- Myolie Wu as Hu Yongmei (胡咏梅)
  - The only daughter of the Hu family. She was betrothed to Wu Pin, but the marriage didn't go through due to Du Mingli's meddling. Hu Yongmei has a deep hatred towards Zhou Ying, believing that Zhou Ying forced her father to his death for his part in the failed business collaboration.
- Yu Haoming as Du Mingli (杜明礼)
  - The main antagonist. He is an unscrupulous political schemer who serves Zaiyi, an anti-foreign politician and royal prince. He has business ambitions but lacks skill. He also has a twisted love for Hu Yongmei after she gave him food when he was a young beggar on the streets.

=== Supporting ===
==== Shen family ====
- Tang Qun as Lady Li
  - Shen Sihai's mother.
- Tse Kwan-ho as Shen Sihai (沈四海)
  - Shen Xingyi's father. One of the two pillars of the Jingyang business enterprise. He is a puppet of Du Mingli.
- Liu Jie as Wife of Shen Sihai
  - Mother of Shen Yuesheng and Shen Xingyi.
- Li Jie as Shen Yuesheng (沈月生)
  - Shen Xingyi's older brother.
- Wang Luyun as Linglong (玲珑)
  - Shen Xingyi's maidservant.

==== Wu family ====
- Chang Chen-kuang as Wu Weiwen (吴蔚文)
  - Patriarch of the Wu family's eastern courtyard. He is a capable and upright businessman who saw the potential in Zhou Ying, and defies all odds to groom her into a talented businesswoman.
- Mimi Kung as Lady Zheng (郑氏)
  - Wife of Wu Weiwen, and mother of Wu Pin. Being the only surviving member of the eastern courtyard, she later treats Zhou Ying as her biological daughter after Zhou Ying helps the family through thick and thin.
- Han Yuanqi, Han Peizhen as Wu Yucheng (吴玉成), Wu Huaixian (吴怀先) (courtesy name Nianxi 念昔)
  - Zhou Ying's adopted son, originally from the central courtyard.
- Hou Changrong as Wu Weiwu (吴蔚武)
  - Head of the western courtyard, father of Wu Ze and Wu Yi. He partners with Zhou Ying and helps her revive the family business.
- Zhang Tianyang as Wu Ze (吴泽)
  - Young master of the western courtyard, father of Wu Yusheng and Wu Yutong. He is seen as a rival to Wu Pin, but only wants to focus on his studies and become a scholar. He later joins the Hundred Days' Reform.
- Ceng Qi as Wu Yi (吴漪)
  - Young mistress of the western courtyard. Despite her status quo, she craves freedom and equality in her heart.
- Tian Xiaobing as Wu Weishuang (吴蔚双)
  - Head of the southern courtyard, father of Wu Yu.
- Wan Meixi as Liu Wan'er (柳婉儿)
  - Wife of Wu Weishuang, and mother of Wu Yu. A greedy and despicable woman who receives due comeuppance for her crimes.
- Xu Nuo as Wu Yu (吴遇)
  - Young master of the southern courtyard. A talented young man who leaves the Wu family after his parents' deaths.
- Tan Xihe as Wu Weiquan (吴蔚全)
  - Head of the central courtyard, grandfather of Wu Yujin, Wu Yulin and Wu Yucheng. A strong believer of feng shui. Initially thinking that Zhou Ying's appearance is a bad omen, he later respects her for her integrity and talent in business.

==== Wu family associates ====
- Liu Peiqi as Zhou Laosi (周老四)
  - Zhou Ying's trickster adoptive father who has a kind heart, and helps his daughter in every way possible. But can also be the source of many of her problems.
- Niki Chow as Qianhong (千红)
  - A singer from the city's largest dance house who has emotional entanglements with Shen Xingyi. She is proud and sharp-tongued, and later helps Zhou Ying in her business ventures. Han Sanchun's wife.
- Wang Haoyu as Han Sanchun (韩三春)
  - Former leader of the Sanshou Clique, eventually becomes Zhou Ying's security chief. Qianhong's husband.
- Gao Haipeng as Treasurer Tong (佟掌柜)
  - Took part in framing the Wu family.
- Li Zefeng as Wang Shijun (王世均)
  - Head steward of the eastern courtyard. He has an unrequited love for Zhou Ying, yet is willing to become her capable assistant and assist her in reviving the Wu family business.
- Gao Yuan as Jiang Fuqi (江福祺)
  - Accountant of the eastern courtyard.
- Wang Yimeng as Xiao Wu (小伍)
- Xu Fangyi as Chunxing (春杏)
  - Zhou Ying's loyal maid and closest confidante.
- Sun Yan as Sun Yongquan (孙永泉)
  - Liu Wan'er's cousin.

==== Others ====
- Shen Baoping as Hu Zhicun (胡志存)
  - Hu Yongmei's father.
- Li Yike as Zhakun (查坤)
  - Du Mingli's personal guard.
- Archie Kao as Tu'erdan (图尔丹)
  - A rich and powerful businessman from the border of western China, near Xinjiang who is in love with Zhou Ying.
- Shi Xiaoman as Aisin Gioro Zaiyi (载漪)
  - Guangxu Emperor's cousin.
- Xi Meijuan as Empress Dowager Cixi (慈禧)
  - She later escapes to Jingyang, and stays at the Wu Residence.
- Zhou Rui as Aisin Gioro Zaitian (载湉)
  - Guangxu Emperor

== Soundtrack ==
Nothing Gold Can Stay – Original Television Soundtrack (那年花开月正圆电视原声带)
No.	Title	Music	Length
1.	"Can't Forget (忘不掉)" (Opening theme song)	Sun Li	4:15
2.	"Walking in the Midst of Moonlight (行走在茫茫月光的中间)" (Ending theme song)	Tan Weiwei	3:43
3.	"I Am the Only One Reluctant to Let Go (一厢情愿的不舍)"	Zhang Lei	3:56
4.	"Simple yet Passionately Unforgettable (简单而炽热的难忘)"	Chen Chusheng	4:04
5.	"You Once Said (你曾说)"	Yisa Yu (Version 1)	4:27
6.	"Let Love Be Broken Repeatedly (让爱碎了再碎)"	Ma Shijian	4:31
7.	"You Once Said (你曾说)"	Zhou Pin & Cui Zige (Version 2)	4:27
8.	"Tragic (悲壮)"	Ni Yafeng	3:20
9.	"Father and Daughter Performing on the Streets (父女街头卖艺)"	Ding Ting	2:37
10.	"Full of vitality (生机勃勃)"	Ding Ting	2:36
11.	"Zhou Ying (周莹)"	Ding Ting	1:58
12.	"Energetic (活泼)"	Ding Ting	2:02
13.	"Tragic (情话)"	Ding Ting	2:18
14.	"Shen Xingyi (沈星移)"	Ding Ting	1:54
15.	"Du Mingli (杜明礼)"	Ding Ting	4:33
16.	"Fog (迷雾)"	Ding Ting	8:07
17.	"Wu Family (吴家)"	Ding Ting	2:48
18.	"Something's Terribly Wrong (大事不妙)"	Ding Ting	3:09
19.	"Pounding Heart (悸动)"	Ding Ting	4:20
20.	"Young Mistress of the Wu Family (吴家少奶奶)"	Ding Ting	4:13
21.	"Passionate (深情)"	Ding Ting	2:54
22.	"Shen Family (沈家)"	Ding Ting	2:27
23.	"Conspiracy (阴谋)"	Ding Ting	2:15
24.	"Misfortune (变故)"	Ding Ting	8:02
25.	"Experiencing the vicissitudes of life (阅尽沧桑)"	Ding Ting	2:48
26.	"Collapse (崩塌)"	Ding Ting	2:20
27.	"Bravery (勇气)"	Ding Ting	2:45
28.	"Burial (下葬)"	Ding Ting	3:01
29.	"Fate (命运)"	Ding Ting	3:17
30.	"Hu Yongmei (胡咏梅)"	Ding Ting	4:24
31.	"Longing (思念)"	Ding Ting	2:33
32.	"Zhao Baishi (赵白石)"	Ding Ting	2:32
33.	"Shen Xingyi's Love (沈星移的爱)"	Ding Ting	3:08
34.	"Western Regions (西域城)"	Ding Ting	2:22
35.	"Breaking Free of Obstacles (冲破艰难)"	Ding Ting	3:18
36.	"Delight (喜上眉俏)"	Ding Ting	1:47
37.	"Shen Xingyi's Feelings (沈星移的感情)"	Ding Ting	2:18
38.	"Zhou Ying's Sweet Romance (周莹的甜蜜)"	Ding Ting	2:08
39.	"Shanghai City (上海城)"	Ding Ting	2:14
40.	"Happiness (幸福)"	Ding Ting	2:43
41.	"Zhou Ying's Feelings (周莹的感情)"	Ding Ting	2:16
42.	"Inwardly Touched (内心的感动)"	Ding Ting	4:31
43.	"New Conquest (新的征途)"	Ding Ting	2:19
44.	"Can't Forget (忘不掉)" (instrumental)	Sun Li	4:15
45.	"Walking in the Midst of Moonlight (行走在茫茫月光的中间)" (instrumental)	Tan Weiwei	3:43
46.	"I Am the Only One Reluctant to Let Go (一厢情愿的不舍)" (instrumental)	Zhang Lei	3:56
47.	"Simple yet Passionately Unforgettable (简单而炽热的难忘)" (instrumental)	Chen Chusheng	4:04
48.	"You Once Said (你曾说)" (instrumental)	Yisa Yu (Version 1)	4:27
49.	"Let Love Be Broken Repeatedly (让爱碎了再碎)" (instrumental)	Ma Shijian	4:31
50.	"You Once Said (你曾说)" (instrumental)	Zhou Pin & Cui Zige (Version 2)	4:27
51.	"You Once Said (你曾说)" (used in the 'full moon' teaser)	Ding Ding (Version 3)	4:39

== Reception ==
=== Critical response ===
The show was commercially successful, and dominated the television ratings throughout its run. Initially it generated much positive reviews and discussion on micro-blog site Weibo and popular review site Douban. However, halfway through its run, there have been complaints about inconsistent writing, the number of unnecessary character deaths, illogical business transactions and the female lead's excessive number of love interests, which ultimately left the drama with a 7.6/10 rating. Despite the negative reviews surrounding the story line, there has been near universal praise for the acting, directing and production values.

=== Ratings ===
China Dragon TV / Jiangsu TV premiere ratings (CSM52)
Episodes	Broadcast date	Dragon TV			Jiangsu TV		
Episodes	Broadcast date	Ratings (%)	Audience share (%)	Rank	Ratings (%)	Audience share (%)	Rank
1–2	August 30, 2017	1.512	4.996	2	1.164	3.83	3
3–4	August 31, 2017	1.571	5.1	1	1.082	3.521	3
5–6	September 1, 2017	1.701	5.57	1	1.161	3.81	3
7–8	September 2, 2017	1.533	4.99	1	1.491	4.87	2
9	September 3, 2017	1.947	6.36	1	1.162	3.8	3
10–11	September 4, 2017	2.005	6.48	1	1.437	4.66	3
12–13	September 5, 2017	2.076	6.77	1	1.553	5.08	2
14–15	September 6, 2017	1.917	6.58	1	1.347	4.63	3
16–17	September 7, 2017	1.959	6.66	1	1.309	4.46	3
18–19	September 8, 2017	2.11	7.06	1	1.592	5.33	2
20–21	September 9, 2017	2.254	7.44	1	1.609	5.32	2
22	September 10, 2017	2.264	7.37	1	1.749	5.9	2
23–24	September 11, 2017	2.513	8.57	1	1.846	6.3	2
25–26	September 12, 2017	2.633	9.049	1	1.860	6.397	2
27–28	September 13, 2017	2.518	8.701	1	1.773	6.135	2
29–30	September 14, 2017	2.609	8.904	1	1.811	6.197	2
31–32	September 15, 2017	2.712	9.217	1	1.817	6.189	2
33–34	September 16, 2017	2.596	8.599	1	1.972	6.543	2
35	September 17, 2017	2.597	8.835	1	1.816	6.198	2
36–37	September 18, 2017	2.808	9.614	1	1.931	6.632	2
38–39	September 19, 2017	2.543	8.76	1	1.952	6.73	2
40–41	September 20, 2017	2.847	9.7	1	1.821	6.22	2
42–43	September 21, 2017	2.794	9.45	1	1.817	6.16	2
44–45	September 22, 2017	3.009	9.87	1	1.809	5.94	2
46–47	September 23, 2017	2.956	9.63	1	1.927	6.29	2
48	September 24, 2017	2.884	9.33	1	1.807	5.86	2
49–50	September 25, 2017	3.094	10.471	1	1.976	6.71	2
51–52	September 26, 2017	3.07	10.33	1	2.034	6.86	2
53–54	September 27, 2017	2.693	9.137	1	1.985	6.757	2
55–56	September 28, 2017	2.755	9.659	1	1.909	6.703	2
57–58	September 29, 2017	2.81	9.601	1	1.829	6.261	2
59–60	September 30, 2017	2.947	9.57	1	2.16	7.04	2
61	October 1, 2017	2.544	8.98	1	1.777	6.27	2
62–63	October 2, 2017	2.926	9.97	1	1.848	6.3	2
64–65	October 3, 2017	3.105	10.3	1	2.022	6.73	2
66–67	October 4, 2017	2.753	9.21	1	1.682	5.63	2
68–69	October 5, 2017	3.207	10.593	1	1.91	6.331	2
70–71	October 6, 2017	3.402	11.138	1	2.038	6.69	2
72–73	October 7, 2017	3.309	10.471	1	2.387	7.57	2
74	October 8, 2017	3.396	10.759	1	2.137	6.769	2
Average		2.564	8.57	—N/a	1.756	5.88	—N/a

- Highest ratings are marked in red, lowest ratings are marked in blue

== Awards and nominations ==
Year	Award	Category	Nominee	Result
2017	4th Hengdian Film and TV Festival of China	Best Television Series	Nothing Gold Can Stay	Won
2017	4th Hengdian Film and TV Festival of China	Best Supporting Actress	Niki Chow	Won
2017	8th Macau International Television Festival	Best Actress	Sun Li	Nominated
2017	8th Macau International Television Festival	Best Writing	Su Xiaoyuan	Nominated
2018	31st Flying Apsaras Awards	Outstanding Television Series (Historical)	Nothing Gold Can Stay	Won
2018	31st Flying Apsaras Awards	Outstanding Actress	Sun Li	Won
2018	24th Shanghai Television Festival	Best Television Series	Nothing Gold Can Stay	Nominated
2018	24th Shanghai Television Festival	Best Director	Ding Hei	Nominated
2018	24th Shanghai Television Festival	Best Actress	Sun Li	Nominated
2018	24th Shanghai Television Festival	Best Supporting Actor	Yu Haoming	Nominated
2018	24th Shanghai Television Festival	Best Art Direction	—N/a	Nominated
2018	29th China TV Golden Eagle Award	Best Actress	Sun Li	Nominated
2018	29th China TV Golden Eagle Award	Best Cinematography		Won
