= Qing Yi Wu Jia =

Qing Yi Wu Jia (Chinese: 情義無價; pinyin: Qíngyì Wú Jià) is a 1988 TV series starring Jaime Chik, Chang Chen-kuang, Chiu Yu Ting (邱于庭) and Kou Shih-hsiun (寇世勳) produced by China Television.

Xin Qing Yi Wu Jia (新情义无价) (2008) starring Huang Haibo (黄海波), Pan Yueming (潘粵明) and Shu Yan (舒砚) is a TV series rewriting the TV series.

== Plot ==
A wealthy man finds out that his girlfriend loves another man. He gives up on the relationship, and grows to love the man's sister. In the 2008 TV series, the setting turns from the present day to the 1930s.
