= Magnolia Award for Best Television Series =

Chinese TV award

The Magnolia Award for Best Television Series (Chinese: 白玉兰奖最佳电视连续剧) is one of the main categories of the Shanghai Television Festival. Gold and Silver awards were created so more series could be recognised, however since 2015, only one television series was given the honor.

== Awards Winners & Nominations ==
=== Chinese-language series ===
Year	Number	Title	S. Chinese Title
2026	31st	Swords Into Plowshares	太平年
2026	31st	Silent Honor	沉默的荣耀
2026	31st	Legend of The Magnate	大生意人
2026	31st	Man's Inhumanity to Man	反人类暴行
2026	31st	Uncle	老舅
2026	31st	A Better Life	蛮好的人生
2026	31st	Born to Be Alive	生命树
2026	31st	This Thriving Land	生万物
2026	31st	Strange Legend of Tang Dynasty III	唐朝诡事录之长安
2026	31st	The Legend of Zang Hai	藏海传
2025	30th	To the Wonder	我的阿勒泰
2025	30th	Escape from the Trilateral Slopes	边水往事
2025	30th	City of the City	城中之城
2025	30th	Born to Be the One	凡人歌
2025	30th	The Tale of Rose	玫瑰的故事
2025	30th	Joy of Life 2	庆余年第二季
2025	30th	She and Her Girls	山花烂漫时
2025	30th	We Are Criminal Police	我是刑警
2025	30th	Northwest Years	西北岁月
2025	30th	Romance in the Alley	小巷人家
2024	29th	Blossoms Shanghai	繁花
2024	29th	Imperfect Victim	不完美受害人
2024	29th	Like a Flowing River 3	大江大河之岁月如歌
2024	29th	A Long Way Home	父辈的荣耀
2024	29th	Welcome to Milele Village	欢迎来到麦乐村
2024	29th	The Long Season	漫长的季节
2024	29th	Always on the Move	南来北往
2024	29th	The Forerunner	问苍茫
2024	29th	The Heart	问心
2024	29th	War of Faith	追风者
2022-2023	28th	Bright Future	县委大院
2022-2023	28th	A Lifelong Journey	人世间
2022-2023	28th	Beyond	超越
2022-2023	28th	Decisive Victory	大决战
2022-2023	28th	The Examination for Everyone	大考
2022-2023	28th	Enemy	对手
2022-2023	28th	Wild Bloom	风吹半夏
2022-2023	28th	The Wind Blows From Longxi	风起陇西
2022-2023	28th	Medal of the Republic	功勋
2022-2023	28th	Ordinary Greatness	警察荣誉
2022-2023	28th	Reset	开端
2022-2023	28th	The Knockout	狂飙
2022-2023	28th	Faith Makes Great	理想照耀中国
2022-2023	28th	The Ideal City	理想之城
2022-2023	28th	A Dream of Splendor	梦华录
2022-2023	28th	The Bond	乔家的儿女
2022-2023	28th	Miles To Go	人生之路
2022-2023	28th	Three-Body	三体
2022-2023	28th	The Long River	天下长河
2022-2023	28th	Our Times	我们这十年
2022-2023	28th	Remembrance of Things Past	我在他乡挺好的
2022-2023	28th	The Story of Xing Fu	幸福到万家
2021	27th	Minning Town	山海情
2021	27th	With You	在一起
2021	27th	Across the Yalu River	跨过鸭绿江
2021	27th	Like a Flowing River 2	大江大河2
2021	27th	Awakening Age	觉醒年代
2021	27th	My Best Friend's Story	流金岁月
2021	27th	Trident	三叉戟
2021	27th	Nothing But Thirty	三十而已
2021	27th	Fearless Whispers	隐秘而伟大
2021	27th	The Stage	装台
2020	26th	The Thunder	破冰行动
2020	26th	I Will Find You a Better Home	安家
2020	26th	Winter Begonia	鬓边不是海棠红
2020	26th	The Longest Day in Chang'an	长安十二时辰
2020	26th	The Legendary Tavern	老酒馆
2020	26th	Joy of Life	庆余年
2020	26th	Amnesty 1959	特赦1959
2020	26th	Diplomatic Situation	外交风云
2020	26th	A Little Reunion	小欢喜
2020	26th	On the Road	在远方
2019	25th	Like a Flowing River	大江大河
2019	25th	All Is Well	都挺好
2019	25th	The Story of Zheng Yang Gate	正阳门下小女人
2019	25th	The Story of Minglan	知否知否应是红肥绿瘦
2019	25th	The Rise of Phoenixes	天盛长歌
2019	25th	Memories of Peking	芝麻胡同
2019	25th	Perfect Youth	最美的青春
2019	25th	The Way We Were	归去来
2019	25th	The City of the Family	那座城这家人
2019	25th	Entrepreneurial Age	创业时代
2018	24th	White Deer Plain	白鹿原
2018	24th	The Advisors Alliance	大军师司马懿之军师联盟
2018	24th	Peace Hotel	和平饭店
2018	24th	ER Doctors	急诊科医生
2018	24th	Nirvana in Fire 2	琅琊榜之风起长林
2018	24th	Wonderful Life	美好生活
2018	24th	Nothing Gold Can Stay	那年花开月正圆
2018	24th	The Love of Courtyard	情满四合院
2018	24th	A Splendid Life in Beijing	生逢灿烂的日子
2018	24th	The First Half of My Life	我的前半生
2017	23rd	The Good Fellas	好家伙
2017	23rd	My Uncle Zhou Enlai	海棠依旧
2017	23rd	To Be a Better Man	好先生
2017	23rd	Ode to Joy	欢乐颂
2017	23rd	Feather Flies To The Sky	鸡毛飞上天
2017	23rd	Marshal Peng Dehuai	彭德怀元帅
2017	23rd	In the Name of People	人民的名义
2017	23rd	A Love For Separation	小别离
2017	23rd	Chinese Style Relationship	中国式关系
2017	23rd	The Last Visa	最后一张签证
2016	22nd	The Legend of Mi Yue	芈月传
2016	22nd	Tiger Mom	虎妈猫爸
2016	22nd	The Journey of Flower	花千骨
2016	22nd	Drama Theatre	剧场
2016	22nd	Nirvana in Fire	琅琊榜
2016	22nd	Glorious Past of Qingdao	青岛往事
2016	22nd	The Young General	少帅
2016	22nd	The Disguiser	伪装者
2016	22nd	Legend of Entrepreneurship 2	温州两家人
2016	22nd	In The Silence	于无声处
2015	21st	All Quiet in Peking	北平无战事
2015	21st	Red Sorghum	红高粱
2015	21st	Hey, Old Man!	嘿，老头!
2015	21st	Old Farmer	老农民
2015	21st	Deng Xiaoping at the turn of history	历史转折中的邓小平
2015	21st	Ma Xiangyang Goes to the Countryside	马向阳下乡记
2015	21st	Ordinary World	平凡的世界
2015	21st	Divorce Lawyers	离婚律师
2015	21st	A Servant of Two Masters	一仆二主

Year	Golden Award	Silver Award
2014	If Life Cheats You / 假如生活欺骗了你	Let's Get Married / 咱们结婚吧
2013	The Orphan of Zhao / 赵氏孤儿	We Love You, Mr. Jin / 金太狼的幸福生活
2012	Cliff / 悬崖	Indelible designation‘’ / 永不磨灭的的番号
2011	Before Dawn / 黎明之前	Three Kingdoms
2010	The Road We Have Taken	A Beautiful Daughter-in-law Era / 媳妇的美好时代
2009	Lurk	N/A
2008	Soldiers Sortie	Golden Wedding / 金婚

=== Foreign TV series ===
Year	Golden Award	Silver Award
2019	(Spain) Presunto culpable (long)	
2019	(Germany) Das Boot (short)	
2018	(Germany) Babylon Berlin (long)	
2018	(Spain) Cable Girls (short)	
2017	(United States) Outlander (long)	
2017	(Germany) Sinner (short)	
2016	(United States) Game of Thrones (long)	
2016	(United States) Tenderness (short)	
2015	(United States) Modern Family (long)	
2015	(Germany) Tannbach (short)	
2014	(United States) Breaking Bad	(South Korea) My Love from the Star
2013	(United States) Homeland	(South Korea) That Winter, the Wind Blows
2012	(United Kingdom) Downton Abbey	(Japan) I'm Mita, Your Housekeeper (South Korea) Moon Embracing the Sun
