= Zhu Lin (actress) =

- 朱琳
- Born: 20 December 1952 (age 72); Beijing, China
- Occupation: Actress
- Years active: 1981–present
- Awards: Golden Eagle Awards – Best Actress; 1987 Triumph In The Midnight

Chinese name
- Traditional Chinese: 朱琳
- Simplified Chinese: 朱琳
Transcriptions
- Musical career
- Also known as: Lin Zhu

Zhu Lin (born 1952) is a Chinese film actress. In 1978, Zhu graduated from Chinese Academy of Medical Sciences. Then she passed the examination of Beijing Film Academy. Her most famous role is the Queen of the Women's Kingdom in 1986 TV-series Journey To The West. In 1987, Zhu Lin won the Golden Eagle Award for Best Leading Actress for Triumph In The Midnight. She then became a popular leading actress in Chinese TV series. She is currently a member of the China Film Association, China Film Performance Art Academy and China Association for Promoting Democracy.

== Filmography ==
- Luo Tuo Cao (Camel Grass) 骆驼草 (1983) Liu Ying
- Journey to the West (1986 TV series) 西游记 (1986) (TV) The Queen of the Women's Kingdom
- Triumph In The Midnight 凯旋在子夜 (1987) (TV) Jiang Man
- Far Removed From The War Age 远离战争的年代 (1987) Wen Yan
- Chinese Family 421 中国家庭421 (2005) Shang Meifang
- Father And Mother (Seasons 1 and 2) 家有爹娘 第一部-第二部 (2006–2008) Liu Ying
- What On Earth Do You Want? 你到底要什么 (2009) Zhang Shouping
