= Golden Eagle Award Audience's Choice for Actress (China) =

Television award category

Golden Eagle Award for Audience's Choice for Actress also known as Top Favorite Actresses (Chinese name:中國電視金鷹獎觀眾喜愛的女演員,2000–2020). In the 18th edition, it was split into "Audience's Choice for Leading Actress" (观众最喜爱女主角) and "Audience's Choice for Supporting Actress" (观众最喜爱女配角). From the 19th to the 30th editions, the award reverted to the single category of "Audience's Choice for Actress". This award category was discontinued in the 31st edition in 2022. Regarding the number of winners, for the 19th to the 22nd editions, six, five or four actresses received the award. Subsequently, the number of winners was reduced, first to two, and then to a single recipient.

== Winners and nominees ==
=== 2020s ===
| Year | Number | Actress | Television Series |
|---|---|---|---|
| 2020 | 30th | Zhao Liying 赵丽颖 | The Story of Minglan 知否？知否？应是绿肥红瘦 |

=== 2010s ===
| Year | Number | Actress | Television Series |
|---|---|---|---|
| 2018 | 29th | Ding Liuyuan 丁柳元 | Original Inspiration 初心 |
| 2018 | 29th | Dilraba Dilmurat 迪丽热巴 | Pretty Li Huizhen 漂亮的李慧珍 |
| 2018 | 29th | Liu Tao 刘涛 | Ode to Joy 欢乐颂; The Advisors Alliance 大军师司马懿之军师联盟 |
| 2018 | 29th | Sun Li 孙俪 | Nothing Gold Can Stay 那年花开月正圆 |
| 2018 | 29th | Yang Zi 杨紫 | Ode to Joy 欢乐颂 |
| 2018 | 29th | Yuan Quan 袁泉 | The First Half of My Life 我的前半生 |
| 2018 | 29th | Yin Tao 殷桃 | Feather Flies To The Sky 鸡毛飞上天 |
| 2018 | 29th | Kan Qingzi 阚清子 | Sparrow 麻雀 |
| 2016 | 28th | Zhao Liying 赵丽颖 | The Journey of Flower\花千骨 |
| 2016 | 28th | Tong Liya 佟丽娅 | The Ordinary World\平凡的世界 |
| 2016 | 28th | Li Xiaomeng 李小萌 | The Ordinary World\平凡的世界 |
| 2016 | 28th | Liu Tao 刘涛 | The Legend of Mi Yue\羋月傳 |
| 2016 | 28th | Ma Su 马苏 | The Legend of Mi Yue\羋月傳 |
| 2016 | 28th | Xu Baihui 徐百卉 | The Legend of Mi Yue\羋月傳 |
| 2016 | 28th | Zuo Xiaoqing 左小青 | In the Silence\于无声处 |
| 2016 | 28th | Tang Jingmei 湯晶媚 | Ten Miles With Red Army\十送红军 |
| 2014 | 27th | Liu Tao 刘涛 | To Elderly with Love\老有所依 |
| 2014 | 27th | Sun Li 孙俪 | Hot Mom!\辣妈正传 |
| 2014 | 27th | Hou Mengyao 侯梦瑶 | The Story of Mulan\花木兰传奇 |
| 2014 | 27th | Wang Weiwei 王维维 | Xin Shu\心术 |
| 2014 | 27th | Wang Like 王力可 | Heroes in Sui and Tang Dynasties\隋唐演义 |
| 2014 | 27th | Zhu Dan 朱丹 | OB Gyns\爱的妇产科 |
| 2014 | 27th | Song Dandan 宋丹丹 | Beautiful Contract\美丽的契约 |
| 2014 | 27th | Gao Yuanyuan 高圆圆 | We Get Married\咱们结婚吧 |
| 2014 | 27th | Tian Min 田岷 | We Get Married\咱们结婚吧 |
| 2014 | 27th | Siqin Gaowa 斯琴高娃 | The Grand Mansion Gate 3\大宅门1912 |
| 2014 | 27th | Liu Lin 刘琳 | Romance of Our Parents\父母爱情 |
| 2014 | 27th | Chen Jin 陈瑾 | Shen Tou\渗透 |
| 2012 | 26th | Song Jia 宋佳 | The Cliff\悬崖 |
| 2012 | 26th | Ma Su 马苏 | Beauty of Innocence\厂花 |
| 2012 | 26th | Chen Shu 陈数 | Iron Pear\铁梨花 |
| 2012 | 26th | Yue Hong 岳红 | Running into Good Luck\抬头见喜 |
| 2010 | 25th | Yan Ni 闫妮 | The Wind From North\北风那个吹 |
| 2010 | 25th | Yao Chen 姚晨 | Lurk\潜伏 |
| 2010 | 25th | Hai Qing 海青 | A Beautiful Daughter-in-law Era\媳妇的美好时代 |
| 2010 | 25th | Wang Qianhua 王茜华 | Women Country\女人乡村 |

=== 2000s ===
| Year | Number | Actress | Television Series |
|---|---|---|---|
| 2008 | 24th | Jiang Wenli 蒋雯丽 | Golden Marriage\金婚 |
| 2008 | 24th | Liu Jia 刘佳 | Gebi Mother\戈壁母亲 |
| 2008 | 24th | Tong Lei 童蕾 | Song of the Youth\青春之歌 |
| 2008 | 24th | Sa Rina 萨日娜 | Chuang Guandong\ 闯关东 |
| 2006 | 23rd | Jiang Qinqin 蒋勤勤 | Qiao's Grand Courtyard |
| 2006 | 23rd | Liu Jia 刘佳 | Ren Changxia\任长霞 |
| 2006 | 23rd | Zhu Yuanyuan 朱媛媛 | Nine Phoenixes\家有九凤 |
| 2006 | 23rd | Yin Tao 殷桃 | Papa Can You Hear Me Sing?\搭错车 |
| 2004 | 22nd | Sun Li 孙俪 | Goddess of Mercy\玉观音 |
| 2004 | 22nd | Wang Ji 王姬 | The Greatest Building\天下第一楼 |
| 2004 | 22nd | Chen Hao 陈好 | Pink Girls\粉红女郎 |
| 2004 | 22nd | Ni Ping 倪萍 | Romantic Affairs\最浪漫的事 |
| 2004 | 22nd | Xi Meijuan 奚美娟 | To be the Banker or Dealer\坐庄 |
| 2003 | 21st | Song Jia 宋佳 | Red Poppies\尘埃落定 |
| 2003 | 21st | Fan Zhibo 范志博 | The Female Leader of Tank Squadrons \女装甲团长 |
| 2003 | 21st | Mei Ting 梅婷 | Restart Love\让爱重来 |
| 2003 | 21st | Lü Liping 吕丽萍 | Big-feet Queen\大脚马皇后 |
| 2003 | 21st | Xie Lan 谢兰 | Blood in the Snow\雪白血红 |
| 2003 | 21st | Wang Haiyan 王海燕 | Quiet Promise\誓言无声 |
| 2002 | 20th | Lü Liping 吕丽萍 | The Years of Intense Emotion\激情燃烧的岁月 |
| 2002 | 20th | Tao Hong 陶虹 | Nothing in the Mirror\空镜子 |
| 2002 | 20th | Wang Qian 王茜 | The VI Group of Fatal Case\ 重案六组 |
| 2002 | 20th | ~~Xu Qing 许晴~~ (Note: Absent from the award ceremony and disqualified from winning.) | ~~Chinese Women under the Gun of Gestapo\许晴~~ |
| 2002 | 20th | ~~Jiang Shan 江珊~~ | ~~Never Give Up\永不放弃~~ |
| 2001 | 19th | Cao Ying 曹颖 | Traceless Snow\大雪无痕 |
| 2001 | 19th | Li Yuanyuan 李媛媛 | Century life: Legend of Dong Zhujun\世纪人生：董竹君传奇 |
| 2001 | 19th | Xiong Xiao 肖雄 | Top Gun\ 壮志凌云 |
| 2001 | 19th | Liu Bei 刘蓓 | The Red Carnation\红色康乃馨 |
| 2001 | 19th | Lei Min 雷敏 | Women's SWAT\ 女子特警队 |
| 2000 | 18th | Juan Zi 娟子 | Beijing Woman\北京女人 |
| 2000 | 18th | Su Jin 苏瑾 | Never Close the Eye\永不瞑目 |
| 2000 | 18th | Zhu Yuanyuan 苏瑾 | Loquacious Zhang Damin's Happy Life\贫嘴张大民的幸福生活 |
