= A Little Reunion =

Chinese TV series

- Original title: 小欢喜
- Genre: Family, drama
- Screenplay by: Huang Lei
- Directed by: Wang Jun
- Starring: Huang Lei; Hai Qing; Tao Hong; Sha Yi; Wang Yanhui; Yong Mei
- Country of origin: China
- Original language: Mandarin
- No. of seasons: 3
- No. of episodes: 49 (Season 1)

Production
- Executive producer: Xu Xiaoou
- Production companies: Linmon Pictures; Yili Changjiang Rongyi Hesheng Film and Television Media

Original release
- Network: Dragon Television; Zhejiang Television; Tencent Video; IQIYI
- Release: July 31 – August 27, 2019

Related
- A Little Mood for Love; A Love for Dilemma

A Little Reunion (Chinese: 小欢喜; pinyin: Xiao Huan Xi) is a 2019 Chinese television series which focuses on the topic of the National College Entrance Examination, also known as the gaokao. The series airs on Dragon Television, Zhejiang Television, Tencent Video and IQIYI starting July 31, 2019. It was one of the highest rated TV series of 2019, receiving positive reviews from audiences and is one of the most popular CGTN shows for foreign viewers.

== Plots ==
A story about three different families whose children are about to finish their final year of high school and face the “gaokao”, China’s university entrance exam. The three families, Fang, Ji, and Qiao, come to rely on one another as they face many different struggles during the final year of high school.

Stable and loving couple Fang Yuan and Tong Wen Jie but heads with their son, Fang Yifan, over his grades at school. Fang Yuan is usually put in the middle between his wife and son as they get into arguments. Single mom Song Qian is extremely overprotective over her daughter Qiao Yingzi. She doesn’t want Yingzi’s father, Qiao Weidong, from disrupting their life. Ji Yangyang’s parents come back from abroad and he is forced to live with them for many years. He finds it hard to get along with his parents who feel like strangers to him.

The families go through many ups and downs, love, laughter, and tears, as they embark on their final year together.

== Reception ==
It was one of the highest rated TV series of 2019, receiving positive reviews from audience.

A Little Reunion is one of the most popular CGTN series for foreign viewers.

== Cast ==
- Huang Lei as Fang Yuan
- Hai Qing as Dong Wenjie
- Tao Hong as Song Qian
- Sha Yi as Qiao Weidong
- Wang Yanhui as Ji Shengli
- Yong Mei as Liu Jing
- Zhou Qi as Fang Yifan
- Li Gengxi as Qiao Yingzi
- Guo Zifan as Ji Yangyang
- Liu Jiayi as Lin Lei'er
- Ren Zhong as Liu Zheng
- Wu Shile as Huang Zhiju
- Xu Fanxi as Li Meng
- Wang Yuexin as Pan Shuai
- Zhong Lili as Wang Yidi
- Jin Feng as Xiao Meng
- Bai Yu as Chen Qi
- Guo Guangping as Principal
- Jiao Tiyi as Father Fang
- Yang Qing as Mother Fang
- Xu Min as Liu Jing's father
- Li Yeping as Liu Jing's mother
- Wang Qing as Bai Yidi's mother
- Yang Yuting as Jenny
- Feng Hui as CEO Yang
- Jin Xi as Miss Jin (Xiao Jin)
- Zhu Tie as Raymond

== Award and nominations ==
Award	Category	Nominee	Result	ref.
26th Shanghai Television Festival	Best Television Series	A Little Reunion	Nominated	
26th Shanghai Television Festival	Best Director	Wang Jun	Won	
26th Shanghai Television Festival	Best Adapted Screenplay	Huang Lei	Nominated	
26th Shanghai Television Festival	Best Actor	Huang Lei	Nominated	
26th Shanghai Television Festival	Best Actress	Hai Qing	Nominated	
26th Shanghai Television Festival	Best Supporting Actor	Sha Yi	Nominated	
26th Shanghai Television Festival	Best Supporting Actress	Tao Hong	Won	
26th Shanghai Television Festival	Best Supporting Actress	Yong Mei	Nominated	
30th China TV Golden Eagle Award	Outstanding Television Series	A Little Reunion	Nominated	
30th China TV Golden Eagle Award	Best Actress	Tao Hong	Nominated	
32nd Feitian Awards	Outstanding Television Series	A Little Reunion	Won	
32nd Feitian Awards	Outstanding Actress	Hai Qing	Nominated	
