= Lin Chenfu =

Lin Chenfu (1924–2006, Chinese: 林辰夫), a native of Yantai, Shandong Province, was a director in the People's Republic of China.

== Biography ==
In February 1942, he joined the revolutionary work and in February 1947, he joined the Chinese Communist Party. He served as instructor and sub-captain of the propaganda team of Beihai Military Sub-district in Huang County, Jiaodong, deputy secretary-general of the Literature Federation of Zhejiang Province, deputy director of the Publicity Department of the Zhejiang Provincial Committee of the Chinese Communist Party, standing member of the CCP committee and director of the office of Hangzhou Iron and Steel Factory, director of Zhejiang Television Station, member of the CCP committee and deputy director of the Zhejiang Provincial Broadcasting Bureau, vice-chairman of the China Television Artists Association, president of the Research Society of Television Drama and Opera Art of the China Television Association, president of the Television Artists' Association of Zhejiang Province, and editor-in-chief of Popular Television. On November 13, 2003, he was awarded the "Special Contribution Award of China Television Golden Eagle Award"; He died on November 26, 2006, at the age of 82 in Hangzhou.
