= Chang Chen-kuang =

Taiwanese actor (born 1956)

Chang Chen-kuang (Chinese: 張晨光; Pe̍h-ōe-jī: Tiuⁿ Sîn-kong; born 1956) is a Taiwanese actor. He is also known by the names Jack Chang, Morning Chang, or Morni Chang. Chang was shortlisted several times for the Golden Bell Award for Best Actor, winning the honor in 1992 and 2004. He is of Mainland Chinese descent.

== Selected filmography ==
- Qing Yi Wu Jia (1988)
- Crouching Tiger, Hidden Dragon (2001)
- Letter 1949 (2008)
- Knock Knock Loving You (2009)
- Night Market Life (2009–2011)
- Beauty World (2011)
- Sealed with a Kiss (2011)
- Back to 1942 (2012)
- National Treasure (2017)
- Nothing Gold Can Stay (2017)
- Ode to Joy (2017)
- Entering a New Era (2018)
- The Faces of My Gene (2018)
- Our Glamorous Time (2018)
- All Is Well (2019)
- My Best Friend's Story (2020–2021)
- Soul Snatcher (2020)
- Rising With the Wind (2023)
