= A Better Life (TV series) =

- Promotional poster
- 蛮好的人生
- Genre: Workplace drama
- Written by: Fei Huijun; Li Xiaoliang
- Directed by: Wang Jun
- Starring: Sun Li; Dong Zijian; Myolie Wu; Gao Xin (actor); Chen Yao
- Country of origin: China
- Original language: Mandarin
- No. of episodes: 36

Production
- Running time: 45 minutes
- Production companies: China Central Television; Shangshi Film & TV; Youku

Original release
- Network: CCTV-8; Youku
- Release: 17 April – 4 May 2025

A Better Life (Chinese: 蛮好的人生, lit. "Pretty Good Life") is a 2025 Chinese workplace-drama television series directed by Wang Jun and starring Sun Li and Dong Zijian. Produced by China Central Television (CCTV), Shangshi Film & TV and Youku, the 36-episode series premiered on 17 April 2025 in CCTV-8's prime-time slot with simultaneous online release on Youku.

== Plot ==
Hu Manli (Sun Li) is a 39-year-old star insurance broker in Shanghai whose life implodes when both her marriage and a career-making deal collapse on the same day. The person behind the sabotage is Xue Xiaozhou (Dong Zijian), a disillusioned 28-year-old heir who has just entered the insurance business. After several confrontations, the pair recognise their complementary strengths and form a mentor–protégé partnership, rebuilding their reputations while confronting ethical dilemmas within China's modern insurance sector.

== Cast ==
- Sun Li as Hu Manli – 39-year-old elite broker
- Dong Zijian as Xue Xiaozhou – 28-year-old industry newcomer
- Myolie Wu as Qiu Lisu – insurance-firm executive and Ding Zhi Yuan's mistress turned lover.
- Ye Qing as Tang Ling – Hu Manli's colleague
- Sebrina Chen as Wu Ya – Xue Xiaozhou's girlfriend (doctor)
- Gao Xin as Ding Zhi Yuan – Hu Manli's estranged husband
- Xu Weiluo as Ding Da Er - Hu Man Li and Ding Zhi Yuan only son
- Tong Lei as Zhong Ning – Hu Man Li's close friend and Ding Zhi Yuan assistant
- Connie Kang as Li Yu Ke

as Li Fen Dou's only daughter

- Wu Junmei as Dr. Tang (guest)
- Zhang Chenguang as Hu Manli's father (guest)
- Feng Lei as Branch manager (guest)
- Zhao Longhao as Liu Guozheng (guest)

== Production ==
The drama was selected by the Shanghai Municipal Cultural Development Foundation as a key cultural project. Principal photography took place from March 2024 to July 2024 at more than 80 Shanghai locations—among them the Bund, Shanghai Jiao Tong University's Xuhui campus and Hongqiao World Centre.

== Release ==
CCTV-8 broadcast two episodes nightly from 17 April to 4 May 2025; Youku offered a three-episode VIP launch followed by two episodes daily. The series later received secondary satellite runs on Beijing TV and Dragon TV.

== Episodes ==
No.	Title	Summary
1	Hu Manli Discovers Ding Zhiyuan's Affair	While preparing for an industry award, Hu Manli uncovers evidence of her husband Ding Zhiyuan's secret relationship, triggering a personal and professional crisis.
2	Hu Manli Jumps into the River to Save Her Marriage	Devastated by her husband's infidelity, Hu Manli stages a dramatic river-jump to win him back, only to realize his feelings have moved on.
3	Chen Fang Frames Hu Manli	Business rival Chen Fang conspires to plant false evidence accusing Hu Manli of insurance fraud, costing her both reputation and her job.
4	Xue Xiaozhou Resigns Upon Learning the Truth	After uncovering Hu Manli's unjust dismissal, Xue Xiaozhou quits his post at Nanyang Insurance in protest.
5	Hu Manli Forced to Sell Handbags to Make Ends Meet	Banned from the insurance industry, Hu Manli reluctantly sells her designer handbags to raise funds and keep afloat.
6	Hu Manli and Xue Xiaozhou Form a Partnership	Recognizing their complementary strengths, Hu Manli offers Xue Xiaozhou her client list in exchange for his broker licence, initiating their collaboration.
7	Hu Manli and Xue Xiaozhou Sign the Partnership Agreement	The pair negotiate terms and officially sign a 30/70 commission split, cementing their working alliance.
8	Hu Manli Takes Xue Xiaozhou to Follow Ah Dong	To nail down a client's trust, Hu Manli drags Xue Xiaozhou on a week-long stakeout to expose her mother's new companion as a fraud.
9	Zhou Shufang Reveals the Truth to Sun Jie	Senior client Zhou Shufang confronts her daughter's friend about family secrets, forcing Hu Manli to navigate delicate family dynamics.
10	Hu Manli and Xue Xiaozhou Land Their First Policy	Under pressure to perform, the duo secures their first major policy with Zhou Shufang by turning a family dispute into a successful negotiation.
11	Xue Xiaozhou and Hu Manli Terminate Their Contract	After closing their first big sale, misunderstandings over commission lead Xue Xiaozhou to threaten ending their partnership—until Hu Manli steps in to reconcile.
12	Ma Xiaowei Angers Ai Zhonghua to Illness	Family tensions flare as Ma Xiaowei's boastful behaviour causes client Ai Zhonghua to suffer a stress-induced health crisis.
13	Hu Manli Asks Xue Xiaozhou to Move into Her Home	Short on rent, Xue Xiaozhou mistakenly moves into Hu Manli's house; she leverages the awkward situation to have him tutor her son.
14	Ai Linjiang Pursues Wu Ya Relentlessly	Meanwhile, insurance executive Ai Linjiang openly courts Wu Ya, who politely rebuffs his advances as Hu Manli juggles in-home tutoring and live-streaming.
15	Hu Manli Suspects Ding Daer of Early Romance	Concerned by her son's secretive behaviour, Hu Manli misinterprets his friendship with a classmate as a teenage romance.
16	Hu Manli Arranges Ding Zhiyuan's Relatives’ Hospital Stay	When Ding Zhiyuan's aunt and uncle fall ill in Shanghai, Hu Manli steps in to smooth hospital logistics despite their estrangement.
17	Qiu Lisu Deliberately Embarrasses Ding Zhiyuan	Qiu Lisu uses Ding Zhiyuan's family troubles to publicly undermine him at an important social event.
18	Hu Manli Revisits Past Clients to Rebuild Trust	Facing dwindling contacts, Hu Manli digs into her two-decade client archive to reignite old relationships.
19	Xue Xiaozhou Faces a Crisis of Confidence	After a crushing breakup, Xue Xiaozhou must choose between returning to comfort-zone tactics or forging ahead with Hu Manli's guidance.
20	Hu Manli Helps Ding Daer Confront His Fears	Balancing client work and motherhood, Hu Manli supports Ding Daer through a school performance anxiety episode.
21	Xue Xiaozhou Wins His First Quarterly Award	Buoyed by Hu Manli's mentorship, Xue Xiaozhou secures top salesperson for the quarter amid cutthroat competition.
22	Hu Manli Faces Industry Scrutiny	A regulatory review into past client cases threatens to derail Hu Manli's comeback plans.
23	Partnership Tested by a High-Stakes Claim	When a multimillion-dollar claim falls through, Hu Manli and Xue Xiaozhou must salvage their credibility.
24	Old Rivalries Resurface	Chen Fang stages a public challenge, forcing Hu Manli and Xue Xiaozhou to defend their ethics under spotlight.
25	A Personal Loss Strengthens Their Bond	A health scare in Xue Xiaozhou's family draws Hu Manli and him closer, revealing deeper layers beneath their partnership.
26	Ding Zhiyuan Seeks Reconciliation	Ding Zhiyuan reaches out to Hu Manli to amend past wounds, complicating her new life.
27	Wu Ya's Career Dilemma	Balancing her nursing work and personal life, Wu Ya must decide whether to return to Xue Xiaozhou or pursue a promotion.
28	Hu Manli's Live-Stream Goes Viral	One of Hu Manli's insurance-education streams unexpectedly trends online, bringing both new clients and critics.
29	A Major Client Threatens to Withdraw	When a long-standing client hints at leaving, Hu Manli races against time to prove her value.
30	Xue Xiaozhou Tackles Ethical Dilemmas	Presented with a lucrative yet ethically grey opportunity, Xue Xiaozhou must choose between profit and principle.
31	Hu Manli and Xue Xiaozhou Have a Dispute	Differences over strategy spark the first real argument in their partnership, threatening to split them apart.
32	Hu Manli Helps Xue Xiaozhou Persuade Li Fendou	Using her insider knowledge, Hu Manli devises a plan to win over a skeptical industry titan for Xue's big pitch.
33	Xue Xiaozhou Confesses Love to Hu Manli and Is Rejected	In an emotional turning point, Xue Xiaozhou admits his feelings, only to have Hu Manli set firm boundaries.
34	Hu Manli Returns to Nanyang, Joins Yiyang	Offered a leadership role, Hu Manli accepts a comeback opportunity at her former firm, Yiyang Insurance.
35	Master Cai Hides Illness for a Stay at the Nursing Home	Loyal client Master Cai conceals his health issues to avoid burdening his family, and Hu Manli uncovers the truth.
36	Hu Manli Finally Wins Her Industry Award	After overcoming every obstacle, Hu Manli is honored with a top insurance-industry award, fulfilling her longtime ambition.

== Reception ==
=== Viewership ===
Xinhua reported that the premiere achieved a nationwide CSM rating of 1.34 percent, ranking first on Chinese television for 17 April 2025. By its first weekend, combined linear and streaming view counts exceeded 4.5 billion, while live ratings peaked above 3 percent for multiple evenings.

=== Critical response and controversy ===
Viewer opinion is divided. Many praised Sun Li's performance and the authentic Shanghai setting, yet some insurance professionals criticised the portrayal of unethical sales tactics, launching the Weibo hashtag #请别妖魔化保险人, (#Please don't demonize insurers). Media commentators from 上观 News argued that the drama intentionally uses "negative examples" to highlight the insurance industry's shift toward stricter regulation.

== Themes ==
Scholars highlight its examination of mid-career reinvention, inter-generational workplace tensions and female agency within China's financial-services boom.
