= Shanghai Bund (TV series) =

2007 Chinese TV series

- Also known as: New Bund
- Genre: Period drama Action; Romance
- Written by: Xu Bing; Wang Wanping; Ouyang Qinshu; Wu Ran
- Directed by: Gao Xixi
- Starring: Huang Xiaoming; Sun Li; Li Xuejian; Huang Haibo; Chen Shu; Sha Yi
- Theme music composer: Joseph Koo; Ding Wei
- Opening theme: New Bund by Frances Yip
- Ending theme: Even If There's No Tomorrow by Huang Xiaoming & Sun Li
- Country of origin: China
- Original language: Mandarin
- No. of episodes: 42

Production
- Executive producer: Li Mi
- Production location: China
- Running time: 45 minutes per episode
- Production company: Beijing Tianzhong Culture Development

Related
- The Bund (1980)

Shanghai Bund
- Traditional Chinese: 新上海灘
- Simplified Chinese: 新上海滩
Transcriptions
Standard Mandarin
- Hanyu Pinyin: Xīn Shànghǎi Tān

Shanghai Bund (Chinese: 新上海滩) is a 2007 Chinese television series directed by Gao Xixi. It is a remake of the 1980 Hong Kong television series The Bund produced by TVB. The series stars Huang Xiaoming, Sun Li, Li Xuejian, Huang Haibo, Chen Shu and Sha Yi in the lead roles.

== Cast ==
- Huang Xiaoming as Xu Wenqiang
- Sun Li as Feng Chengcheng
- Li Xuejian as Feng Jingyao
- Huang Haibo as Ding Lik
- Chen Shu as Fang Yanyun
- Sha Yi as Chen Hanlin
- Lu Jixian as Uncle Xiang
- Zhou Mingshan as Uncle Jiu
- Yin Yitong as Di
- Li Yixiao as Wang Yueqi
- Wang Chao as Li Wangqi
- Zong Xiaojun as Jin Dazhong
- Lu Ling as Yamaguchi Kaoriko
- Yu Bin as Lu Zhengqiu
- Li Jiyou as Changgui
- Zhang Zichen as Biao
- Ni Yilin as Ding Li's mother
- Song Linlin as Du Bang
- Li Yansheng as Chen Lianshan
- Liang Minghua as Morris
- Yi Han as Liu Ming
- Ji Gang as Heizi
- Fan Shide as Nie Renwang
- Yang Qiyu as Kun
- Zhang Yapeng as Bing
- Yao Jianming as Ōshima
- Chen Fu as Inspector Ma
- Yu Jianguo as Hengsan
- Chen Tao as Jie
- Sun Baohai as Lao'er
- Zhang Xiong as Uncle Yu
- Cao Yi as Luo Fu
- Yu Xin as Wang Hanhun
- Li Mingliang as Zhang Dasheng
- Gan Yong as Zenjirō

== Soundtrack ==
Shanghai Bund - Original Television Soundtrack ( 新上海滩电视剧原声音乐大碟)
No.	Title	Music	Length
1.	"New Bund (新上海滩)"	Frances Yip
2.	"Even If There's No Tomorrow (就算没有明天)"	Huang Xiaoming & Sun Li
3.	"Song Haven't End (歌未央)"	Echo
4.	"Lily Love Traces (百合花情思)"	Li Dan
