= I Will Find You a Better Home =

Chinese TV series

- Promotional poster
- Also known as: Your Home is My Business
- Original title: 安家
- Genre: Workplace, Drama
- Screenplay by: Liu Liu
- Directed by: An Jian
- Starring: Sun Li; Luo Jin
- Country of origin: China
- Original language: Chinese
- No. of episodes: 53

Original release
- Release: February 21, 2020

I Will Find You a Better Home (Chinese: 安家; pinyin: An Jia; lit. 'settle down') is a 2020 Chinese television series. It is adapted from the Japanese drama Your Home is My Business!. It is one of the highest rated TV series of 2020, topping the viewing charts of the network it aired on and also recorded more than four billion views online.

== Plot ==
The drama starts off with Xu Wenchang trying to divorce his wife, Zhang Chengcheng, who was caught with her lover, causing the fake divorce to become a reality. Later she tells him that she is pregnant, hoping for a reconciliation but eventually when the baby is born, the DNA result shows her lover is the father of the child. Xu is a branch manager in a large real estate agent company, and unexpectedly moves in with his colleague, Fang Sijin, also a branch manager sent by the Beijing Head Office with a plan to take over Xu. Eventually, they form some kind of relationship as they work, and near the end, they become a couple, after Xu expresses his love for Fang in a song.

== Cast ==
- Sun Li as Fang Sijin
- Luo Jin as Xu Wenchang
- Zhang Meng as Zhang Chengcheng
- Wang Zijian as Wang Zijian
- Tian Lei as Lou Shanguan
- Sun Jiayu as Zhu Shanshan
- Yang Haoyu as Xie Tingfeng
- Hu Ke as Feng Chunhua

== Award and nominations ==
Award	Category	Nominee	Result	ref.
26th Shanghai Television Festival	Best Television Series	I Will Find You A Better Home	Nominated	
26th Shanghai Television Festival	Best Adapted Screenplay	Liu Liu	Nominated	
26th Shanghai Television Festival	Best Actress	Sun Li	Nominated	
30th China TV Golden Eagle Award	Outstanding Television Series	I Will Find You a Better Home	Nominated	
30th China TV Golden Eagle Award	Best Actress	Sun Li	Nominated	
30th China TV Golden Eagle Award	Audience's Choice For Actress	Sun Li	Nominated	
