= China TV Golden Eagle Awards =

Chinese television award

China TV Golden Eagle Award 中国电视金鹰奖
- Golden Eagle Award
- Awarded for: Excellence in Television
- Date: biennial
- Country: China
- Presented by: China Federation of Literary and Art Circles and China Television Artists Association
- First award: March 1983; 43 years ago

China TV Golden Eagle Awards
- Simplified Chinese: 中国电视金鹰奖
- Traditional Chinese: 中國電視金鷹獎
Transcriptions
Standard Mandarin
- Hanyu Pinyin: Zhōngguó Diànshì Jīnyīngjiǎng

The China TV Golden Eagle Award (Chinese: 中国电视金鹰奖), is one of three most prestigious national awards recognizing excellence in the Chinese television industry, alongside the Feitian Awards and Magnolia Awards. It is known as the "national-level television art award uniquely determined primarily by audience voting". The award is presented by the China Federation of Literary and Art Circles and the China Television Artists Association to honor outstanding television professionals and works across China.

Established in 1983, the China TV Golden Eagle Award was originally named the Popular Television Golden Eagle Award. In 1996, it was elevated to a national-level award. In 2000, it was upgraded to the China Golden Eagle TV Art Festival, with Changsha, Hunan designated as its permanent host city. Since 2005, the festival has been held biennially, with awards presented in even-numbered years.

== History ==
Originally known as the Popular Television Golden Eagle Award established in 1983 by Zhejiang's Popular Television magazine, the award was founded by the magazine's editorial department to symbolize the soaring development of China's television industry like an eagle spreading its wings. The initiator was Lin Chenfu, then director of Zhejiang Television Station. The first awards ceremony was held in Kunming in March 1983, with winners selected through reader votes from Popular Television magazine. The ceremony was held annually thereafter.

Starting from the 15th ceremony in 1997, the award was jointly organized by China Federation of Literary and Art Circles (CFLAC) and the China Television Artists Association (CTAA). It was therefore renamed the China TV Golden Eagle Award, becoming a national comprehensive television art award. Initially focused on TV drama categories, it later expanded to include TV entertainment programs, documentaries, art films, and commercials. Each category comprises two main types of awards: "Best Work" and "Individual Achievement". The selection process shifted to a combination of expert evaluations, votes from CTAA members, and audience participation. Final rankings are determined by aggregated scores from these three groups, with audience votes fixed at 40% of the total weight. In case of ties, TV drama awards prioritize audience vote counts.

In 2000, the 18th ceremony marked a major transition when Hunan TV & Broadcast Intermediary Co Ltd signed an agreement with CTAA and the Hunan Radio and Television Administration. The company invested CN¥10 million to secure permanent hosting and commercial rights for the award, along with an annual payment of CN¥2.8 million to CTAA for expert evaluation fees. The award was upgraded to the China Golden Eagle TV Art Festival, aiming to become "China's premier cultural festival brand." Changsha became the permanent host city, with Hunan Television as the official broadcaster. The original rotating annual awards ceremony evolved into a three-day festival, held at the Hunan International Convention and Exhibition Center from 2000 to 2020 and at Hunan Broadcasting System's "Colourful Box" production base in 2022.

From 2005 onward, the Golden Eagle Award shifted to a biennial schedule. Beginning with the 30th ceremony in 2020, the award expanded eligibility to include "online audiovisual programs" such as web dramas, variety shows, documentaries, and animations.

== Eligibility Criteria ==
Works submitted for consideration must be produced by production units approved by National Radio and Television Administration, hold valid distribution licenses, and meet one of the following broadcast requirements:

- TV Series
1. Aired on China Central Television within the specified timeframe;
2. Aired on at least two provincial satellite TV channels within the specified timeframe;
3. Aired on at least four provincial terrestrial channels within the specified timeframe;
4. Released on national key video platforms within the specified timeframe.
- TV Documentaries, Variety/Artistic Programs, and Animations
1. Aired on China Central Television or provincial satellite TV channels within the specified timeframe;
2. Aired on at least two provincial terrestrial channels within the specified timeframe;
3. Aired on at least three municipal terrestrial channels within the specified timeframe;
4. Released on national key video platforms within the specified timeframe.

=== Current Award Categories ===
- Best Television Series (最佳电视剧)
- Best Actor (最佳男演员)
- Best Actress (最佳女演员)
- Best Supporting Actor (最佳男配角)
- Best Supporting Actress (最佳女配角)
- Best Director (最佳导演)
- Best Screenwriter (最佳编剧)
- Best Cinematography (最佳摄影/摄像)
- Best Original Theme Song (最佳原创主题歌曲)
- Best Television Documentary (最佳电视纪录片)
- Best Television Program (最佳电视综艺节目)

=== Defunct categories ===
- Audience's Choice for Actor (观众喜爱的男演员)
- Audience's Choice for Actress (观众喜爱的女演员)
- Best Performing Arts Award (最佳表演艺术奖)
- Best Art Direction (最佳美术)
- Best Lighting (最佳灯光)
- Best Sound Recording (最佳录音)
- Best Television Documentary Director
- Best Literary Arts Programme (最佳电视文艺节目)
- Best Literary Arts Programme Director (最佳电视节目导演)
- Best Host (最佳主持人)
- Best Literary Arts Programme Art Direction
- Best Literary Arts Programme Cinematography

== Major Awards Selection ==
In 2020, it was announced that a separate Best Actor award (最佳男/女演员) was created, and will be awarded based on polling from a panel of judges. Audience's Choice for Actor (观众喜爱的电视剧男演员) will be awarded based solely on three rounds of internet voting. For the first time, web dramas were also included in the list of nominations.

== Golden Eagle Goddess ==
The Golden Eagle Goddess (金鹰女神) is a special symbolic figure established after the China TV Golden Eagle Awards was upgraded to the "China Golden Eagle TV Art Festival." The goddess, depicted with hands lifting a soaring golden eagle, represents the rapid rise of Chinese television dramas. Starting from the 6th China Golden Eagle TV Art Festival and the 23rd China TV Golden Eagle Award in 2006, the organizers materialized the image of the "Golden Eagle Goddess" by selecting a new-generation female star with outstanding representative TV drama works in the past two years to serve as the festival's spokesperson. The first actress to hold the title was Liu Yifei.

On the opening day of each Golden Eagle TV Art Festival, the chosen "Golden Eagle Goddess" performs a dance at the ceremony wearing a full-body golden gown. For the first three editions, the goddess was directly appointed by the organizers. Beginning with the 9th China Golden Eagle TV Art Festival and the 26th China TV Golden Eagle Award in 2012, the selection shifted to public online voting. Liu Shishi ultimately won the title of the fourth "Golden Eagle Goddess" with 2.78 million votes. For the 11th China Golden Eagle TV Art Festival and the 28th China TV Golden Eagle Award, the organizers resumed directly appointing the goddess. Starting from the 12th China Golden Eagle TV Art Festival and the 29th China TV Golden Eagle Award, the title was again determined by online voting.

Since 2022, the Golden Eagle Goddess was officially discontinued.

Year	Actress	Age	Representative works
2006	Liu Yifei	19	Chinese Paladin, The Return of the Condor Heroes
2008	Li Xiaolu	26	All the Misfortunes Caused by the Angel, Struggle, We Love You, Mr. Jin
2010	Wang Luodan	26	My Youthfulness, Struggle, An Xiang
2012	Liu Shishi	25	Chinese Paladin 3, Scarlet Heart, Xuan-Yuan Sword: Scar of Sky
2014	Zhao Liying	27	Legend of Lu Zhen, Boss & Me, The Journey of Flower
2016	Tiffany Tang	33	My Sunshine, Lady & Liar, Legend of Fragrance, Diamond Lover
2018	Dilraba Dilmurat	26	Pretty Li Hui Zhen, The Flame's Daughter, Sweet Dreams
2020	Victoria Song	33	Find Yourself, Ice Fantasy, Moonshine and Valentine

== See also ==
- List of Asian television awards
