= Shanghai Television Festival =

Shanghai Television Festival 上海电视节
- Awarded for: Excellence in Television
- Country: China
- First award: 1988
- Website: http://www.stvf.com

The Shanghai Television Festival (Chinese: 上海电视节), abbreviated STVF, also known as the Shanghai International Television Festival, is the first and one of the largest television festivals in East Asia. Held since 1986, STVF has become one of the most influential and prestigious international television festivals in Asia, strengthening the cooperation and communication between the Chinese media industry and the world.

The festival is also home to the annual Magnolia Awards (Chinese: 白玉兰奖; pinyin: Bái Yù Lán Jiǎng). Awards are handed out to both international and national productions through voting by a panel of award-winning actors, producers, directors and writers, and are the highest industry honours given. It is considered to be one of the most prestigious television awards, alongside the Feitian Awards and Golden Eagle Awards. Since 2004, the Magnolia Awards have been held every year.

== History ==
- In 1986, with the commission of the Shanghai People's Congress, the film festival opened with entries from 16 countries. There were no awards presented.
- In 1988, the film festival created the Magnolia Awards, named after the floral emblem of Shanghai. It awarded Best Actor, Best Actress, Best Documentary and Best Director. Until 2004, it has held an awards ceremony every 2 years.
- In 1990, the categories of Best Animation and Special Jury Award were included. The latter was discontinued in 2007.
- In 2004, the Magnolia Awards became an annual ceremony.
- In 2008, the concept of Gold and Silver Awards were introduced in several categories so more quality productions could gain recognition. This was discontinued in 2015.
- In 2009, public voting for a variety of popularity awards were included. These awards have not been given out annually, and were officially discontinued in 2015.
- A new category awarding variety shows was created in 2015.

== Award categories ==
=== Television series ===
- Best Television Series
- Best Actor
- Best Actress
- Best Director
- Best Writer
- Best Supporting Actor (since 2015)
- Best Supporting Actress (since 2015)
- Best Foreign Television Series
- Best Foreign Television Miniseries

=== Variety ===
- Best Seasonal Variety Show
- Best Variety Show
- Best Face on Variety Show

=== Documentary ===
- Best Serial Documentary
- Best Documentary

=== Animation ===
- Best Animation
- Best Animation Script

=== Defunct categories ===
- Most Popular Director
- Most Popular Actor
- Most Popular Actress
- Most Popular New Actor
- Most Popular New Actress
- Best Television Film or Miniseries Gold and Silver Awards
- Best Directing for a Television Film
- Best Writing for a Television Film
- Best Actor in a Television Film
- Best Actress in a Television Film
- Best Chinese Animation
- Best Foreign Animation
- Best Asian Documentary
- Best Natural Documentary
- Best Society Documentary
- Best Director for a Documentary
- Best Cinematography for a Documentary

== See also ==
- List of Asian television awards
