= Liu Jiang (director) =

Chinese television director

- 刘江
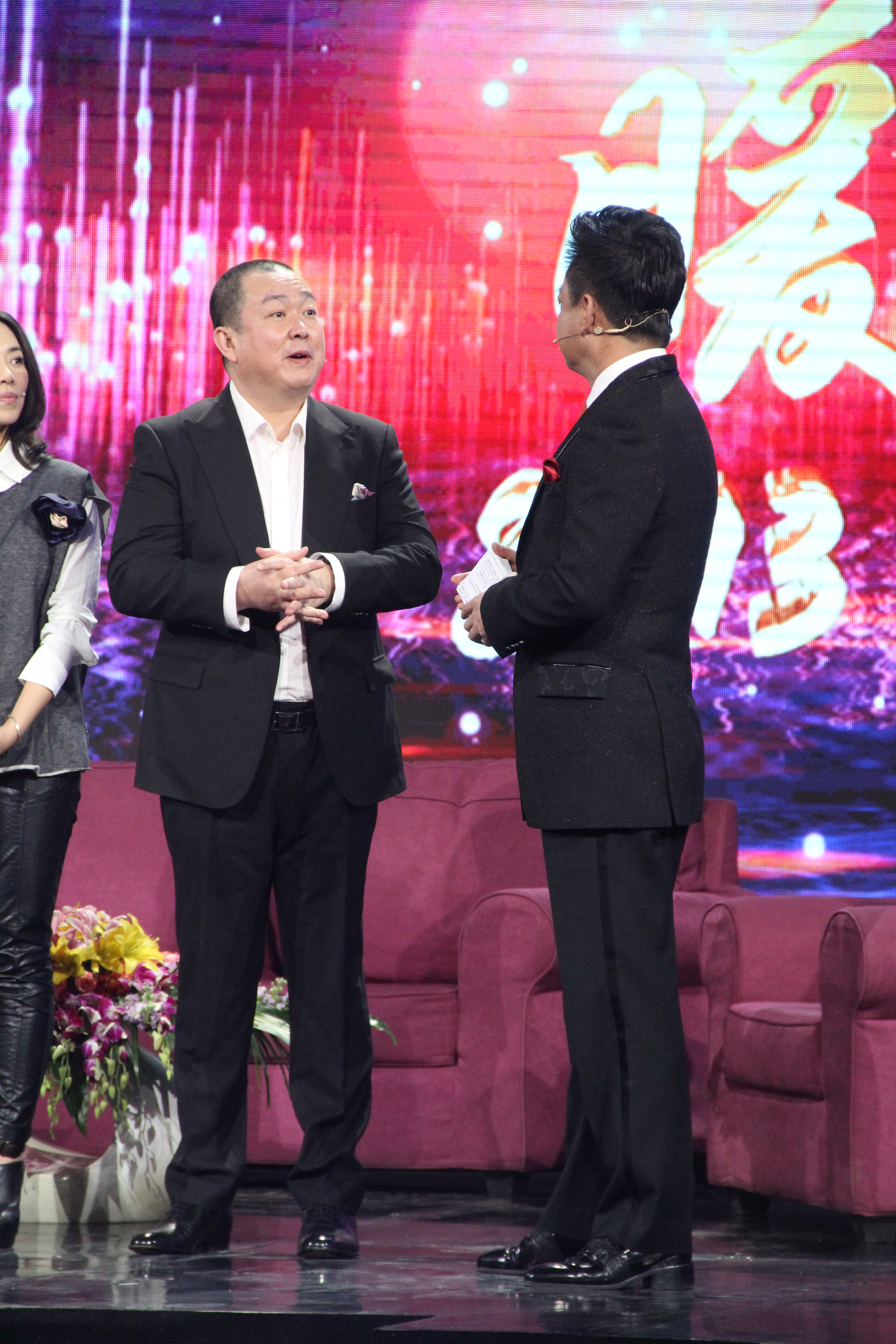
- Liu Jiang in the Chinese talk show Art Life in December 2013.
- Born: February 8, 1969 (age 57); Changdao County, Shandong, China
- Education: Ningxiang No. 1 High School; Beijing Film Academy
- Occupations: Television director, producer, screenwriter
- Years active: 2003-present
- Spouse: Wang Tong (m. 1997)

Chinese name
- Traditional Chinese: 劉江
- Simplified Chinese: 刘江
Transcriptions
Standard Mandarin
- Hanyu Pinyin: Liǘ Jiāng

Liu Jiang (Chinese: 刘江; born 8 February 1969) is a Chinese television director, producer and screenwriter best known for his work Before Dawn, A Beautiful Daughter-in-Law Era and Let's Get Married.

== Early life and education ==
Liu was born on February 8, 1969, in Changdao County, Shandong, with his ancestral home in Ningxiang, Hunan. In 1976, The family moved back to their hometown Ningxiang, where he attended the Ningxiang No. 1 High School. In 1988 he was accepted to the Beijing Film Academy, majoring in acting. After graduation in 1992, he was assigned to the Oriental Song and Dance Company as a singer.

== Career ==
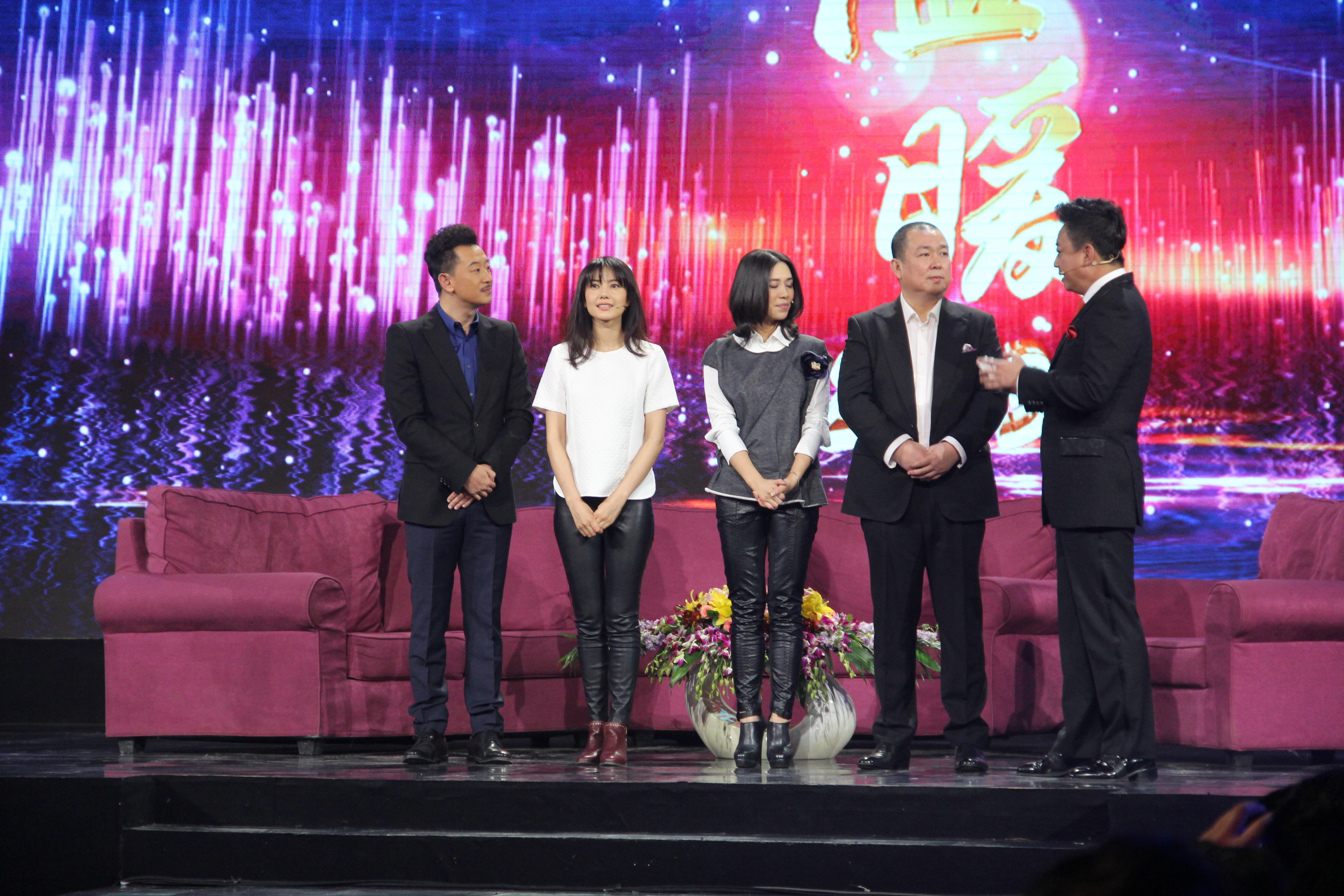
Liu Jiang, Gao Yuanyuan and Huang Haibo in the Chinese talk show Art Life in December 2013.

In 2003, Liu made his directorial debut Iron Youth, a gangster television series starring Jiang Wu, Mei Ting, Pan Yueming, and Han Yuqin.

In 2005, he directed Ju Zhong Ju. The series stars Xu Qing, Yu Hewei, Yin Tao, and Bao Lei.

In 2007, he directed Snowwolf, a television series adaptation based on the novel of the same name by Quan Yongxian.

In 2008 Liu made his film debut Set Off, a comedy film starring Liu Hua, Fan Wei and Ju Wenpei. It won the Best Directorial Debut Award at the 16th Beijing College Student Film Festival. That same year, he directed Suiyue, which marked his second cooperation with Mei Ting and Yu Hewei. Liu was signed to direct the comedy television series Fathers and Mothers in the following year, it was broadcast in QTV-1 in May 2009.

Liu rose to fame after directing A Beautiful Daughter-in-law Era (2010), which earned him an Outstanding Director Award at the 28th Flying Apsaras Awards. That same year, he also directed Before Dawn, for which he won the Most Popular Director Award at the 17th Shanghai Television Festival and was nominated for the Best Director Award.

In 2011, he directed Enemies Among Us, based on Mai Jia's novel of the same name.

In 2013, he was hired to direct Let's get married, for which he received three Best Director Awards at the 18th Chunyan Awards, the 20th Shanghai Television Festival, and the 27th Golden Eagle Awards, the China Television Artists Association’s equivalent to the Emmys. The drama stars Huang Haibo and Gao Yuanyuan and was one of the most watched ones in CCTV while it was aired in mainland China in that year.

In 2016, Liu was confirmed as director of Let's Fall in Love, a romantic comedy television series starring Zhang Jingchu, Zhang Xinyi, Qin Lan, Yuan Hong, and Ming Dao. It is the sequel to Let's get married.

In 2018, Liu directed the romance television series The Way We Were, it stars Tiffany Tang and Luo Jin, and aired on both Dragon Television and Beijing Television.

== Personal life ==
Liu began dating his alumna Wang Tong (王彤) in July 1993. They married in Beijing in 1997.

== Filmography ==
=== Film (As director) ===
Year	English title	Chinese title	Notes
2008	Set Off	即日启程	

=== Television (As director) ===
Year	English title	Chinese title	Notes
2003	Iron Youth	铁血青春	
2005	Ju Zhong Ju	局中局	
2007	Snowwolf	雪狼	
2008	Suiyue	岁月	
2009	Fathers and Mothers	满堂爹娘	
2010	Before Dawn	黎明之前	
2010	A Beautiful Daughter-in-law Era	媳妇的美好时代	
2011	Enemies Among Us	风语	
2012	Shiyan Jinsheng	誓言今生	
2013	Three Gallants in Troubled Times	乱世三义	
2013	Let's get married	咱们结婚吧	
2016	Let's Fall in Love	咱们相爱吧	
2016	The Battle at the Dawn	黎明决战	
2017	The Way We Were	归去来	
2018	The Legendary Tavern	老酒馆	
2021	Dreams and Glory	光荣与梦想	
2023	Warm and Sweet	温暖的，甜蜜的	

=== Television (As screenwriter) ===
Year	English title	Chinese title	Role	Notes
1999	—N/a	双全		
2003	Iron Youth	铁血青春		
2005	Criminal Suspect	犯罪嫌疑人		
2015	Let's get married	咱们结婚吧		

=== Film (As producer) ===
Year	English title	Chinese title	Role	Notes
2015	Detective Chinatown	唐人街探案		

=== Television (As producer) ===
Year	English title	Chinese title	Role	Notes
2015	Let's get married	咱们结婚吧		

== Film and TV Awards ==
Year	Nominated work	Award	Category	Result	Notes
2011	Before Dawn	17th Shanghai Television Festival	Best Director	Nominated	
2011	Before Dawn	17th Shanghai Television Festival	Most Popular Director Award	Won	
2011	A Beautiful Daughter-in-law Era	28th Flying Apsaras Awards	Outstanding Director Award	Nominated	
2013	Shiyan Jinsheng	26th Golden Eagle Awards	Best Director	Nominated	
2014	Let's get married	20th Shanghai Television Festival	Best Director	Won	
2014	Let's get married	27th Golden Eagle Awards	Best Director	Won	
2015	Let's get married	18th Chunyan Awards	Best Director	Won	
2015	Let's get married	10th National TV Production Top Ten Award	Best Director	Won	
2018	The Way We Were	24th Huading Awards	Best Director	Won	
2019	The Way We Were	12th National TV Production Top Ten Award	Best Director	Won	
2020	The Legendary Tavern	26th Shanghai Television Festival	Best Director	Nominated	
2020	The Legendary Tavern	30th Golden Eagle Awards	Best Director	Nominated	
2020	The Legendary Tavern	32nd Flying Apsaras Awards	Best Director	Won	
2021	Dreams and Glory	32nd Huading Awards	Best Director	Won	
2022	Dreams and Glory	18th Chinese American Film Festival	Best Director	Won	
