= Zan Men Jie Hun Ba =

咱们结婚吧, may refer to:

- Let's Get Married, 2015 Chinese romantic drama film
- We Get Married, 2013 Chinese television series starring Gao Yuanyuan and Huang Haibo
