= Daotian =

Daotian may refer to:

- Daotian Middle School, Changsha, China
- Daotian Station, Beijing, China
- Daotian, Shandong, China
