= Our Glamorous Time =

Chinese television series

- Drama poster
- Also known as: You And Me In Time
- Traditional Chinese: 你和我的傾城時光
- Simplified Chinese: 你和我的倾城时光
- Hanyu Pinyin: Nǐ hé Wǒ dě Qīngchéng Shíguāng
- Genre: Workplace; Romance; Drama
- Based on: Our Glamorous Time by Ding Mo
- Written by: Ji An
- Directed by: Zhang Feng
- Starring: Zhao Liying; Jin Han
- Country of origin: China
- Original language: Mandarin
- No. of seasons: 1
- No. of episodes: 50

Production
- Executive producer: Chen Jianjun
- Production locations: Wuhan, Xishuangbanna Dai Autonomous Prefecture
- Running time: 45 mins
- Production companies: Beijing Glory Pictures; Royal Charter Movies & TV Production Group; Whale Wealth; China Reading Limited; Yongle Film and Television

Original release
- Network: Dragon TV, Zhejiang TV
- Release: November 12 – December 9, 2018

Our Glamorous Time (Chinese: 你和我的倾城时光) is a 2018 Chinese television series based on the novel of the same name by Ding Mo; starring Zhao Liying and Jin Han. It is set to air on Dragon TV and Zhejiang TV starting November 12, 2018.

This series has a 5.5 rating on Douban.

== Synopsis ==
The drama will revolve around the romance between young white-collar worker Lin Qian and former military officer turned CEO Li Zhicheng. Lin Qian has the brains and the enthusiasm, but has been unsuccessful in all her ventures so far. Li Zhicheng’s family business is on the verge of bankruptcy, and he returns to the corporate world in an effort to reverse the situation. Lin Qian ends up helping Li Zhicheng revive the company, and they fall in love with each other in the process.

== Cast ==
- Zhao Liying as Lin Qian
  - A white collar worker who becomes the assistant of Aida Group president.
- Jin Han as Li Zhicheng
  - President of Aida Group.
- Cao Xiwen as Zhu Hanqian (Grace)
  - Head editor of "H" magazine.
- Yu Haoming as Gu Yanzhi
  - Zhu Hanqian's nephew who is an overseas returnee. Li Zhicheng's close friend.
- Meng Rui as Chen Zheng
  - CEO of Simeiqi Group.
- Johnny Zhang as Ning Weikai
  - CEO of Baorui Group.
- Zhou Yiwei as Lin Mochen
  - Lin Qian’s elder brother. Vice President of DP group. A man who possesses high IQ and EQ, and he is resolute and decisive in work; but is gentle and caring toward family and friends.
- Lin Yuan as Chen Yayi
  - Lin Qian's close friend who is innocent and gentle. Chen Zheng's love interest.
- Liu Fanfei as Li Jinyuan
  - Li Zhicheng's younger sister who is intelligent and eloquent. She comes between Chen Zheng and Chen Yayi's relationship.
- Hawick Lau as Li Zhiqian
  - Previous CEO of Aida Group. Li Zhicheng's elder brother.
- Chang Chen-kuang as Li Zhongming
  - Founder of Aida Group. Father of Li Zhicheng, Li Jinyuan and Li Zhiqian.
- Wen Yuqi as Cheng Meizi
- Li Yun'ao as Hui Xiong
  - A special forces soldier. Li Zhicheng's former comrade.

== Production ==
The series began filming at Wuhan on July 4, 2017 and wrapped up production on November 1, 2017.

The production team invited Su Mang to act as the fashion/trends director of the series.

== Soundtrack ==
No.	Title	Lyrics	Music	Singers	Length
1.	"When Love Arrives (当爱来临的时候)" (Opening theme song)	Qian Zi	Jiang Fan	Wu Mochou	3:46
2.	"Captivated (着迷)"	Kym, Qian Zi	Jiang Fan	Kym	4:42
3.	"Love in a Glamorous City (倾城之恋)"	Qian Zi		Wakin Chau	3:54
4.	"Black & White Keys (黑白鍵)"	Qian Zi		He Jie	3:24
5.	"Glamorous Time (倾城时光)"	Qian Zi		Jin Han	3:13
6.	"If We Met (如果遇见)"	Qian Zi		Sun Bolun	3:43
7.	"Confession Time (告白时间)"	Qian Zi		Yu Haoming	3:24
8.	"Crazy (瘋)"	Qian Zi		Li Qi	3:30

== Ratings ==
- Highest ratings are marked in red, lowest ratings are marked in blue

Premiere ratings
Air date	Dragon TV CSM52 city ratings			Zhejiang Satellite TV CSM52 City ratings		
Air date	Ratings (%)	Audience share (%)	Rank	Ratings (%)	Audience share (%)	Rank
2018.11.12	0.666	2.46	2	0.591	2.18	3
2018.11.13	0.759	2.81	2	0.569	2.1	3
2018.11.14	0.847	3.1	2	0.691	2.51	3
2018.11.15	0.859	3.12	2	0.715	2.6	3
2018.11.16	0.84	3.25	3	0.777	2.74	4
2018.11.17	0.956	3.35	2	0.784	2.69	4
2018.11.18	0.916	3.15	2	0.707	2.43	4
2018.11.19	0.888	3.26	2	0.694	2.54	4
2018.11.20	0.848	3.09	2	0.793	2.88	3
2018.11.21	0.905	3.25	2	0.651	2.33	3
2018.11.22	0.872	4.32	2	0.619	2.31	4
2018.11.23	0.816	2.94	2	0.739	2.66	3
2018.11.24	0.716	2.61	2	0.667	2.45	4
2018.11.25	0.871	3.02	2	0.69	2.4	4
2018.11.26	0.832	3.01	2	0.741	2.7	3
2018.11.27	0.826	2.99	2	0.739	2.69	3
2018.11.28	0.844	3.06	2	0.704	2.55	3
2018.11.29	0.879	3.22	2	0.854	3.13	3
2018.11.30	0.832	2.94	2	0.719	2.54	3
2018.12.1	0.843	2.94	2	0.799	2.8	3
2018.12.2	0.858	3	2	0.811	2.84	3
2018.12.3	0.867	3.11	2	0.805	2.89	4
2018.12.4	0.805	2.88	3	0.801	2.87	4
2018.12.5	0.882	3.12	4	0.936	3.32	2
2018.12.6	0.857	3.01	4	0.894	3.14	2
2018.12.7	0.887	3	3	0.991	3.35	2
2018.12.8	0.988	3.34	2	0.892	3.03	3
2018.12.9	1.002	3.37	2	1.209	4.06	1

== Awards and nominations ==
Award	Category	Nominated work	Result	Ref.
Influence of Recreational Responsibilities Awards	TV Drama of the Year	Our Glamorous Time	Won	
12th Tencent Video Star Awards	Top Ten Series	Our Glamorous Time	Won	
