= Zhu Jianfan =

Chinese revolutionary and educator

- 朱剑凡
- Born: Zhou Jiachun; 1883; Ningxiang County, Hunan, Qing China
- Died: 1932 (aged 48–49); Shanghai, China
- Education: Kōbun Institute
- Occupations: Revolutionary, educator
- Political party: Kuomintang; Chinese Communist Party
- Spouse: Wei Xiangruo
- Children: 8
- Relatives: Wang Jiaxiang (son-in-law)

Chinese name
- Simplified Chinese: 朱剑凡
- Traditional Chinese: 朱劍凡
Transcriptions
Standard Mandarin
- Hanyu Pinyin: Zhū Jiànfán

Birth name
- Simplified Chinese: 周家纯
- Traditional Chinese: 周家純
Transcriptions
Standard Mandarin
- Hanyu Pinyin: Zhōu Jiāchún

Zhu Jianfan (Chinese: 朱剑凡; 1883–1932), was a Chinese revolutionary and educator. He served as the mayor of Changsha and was the founder of Daotian Middle School, Zhounan High School, and Ningxiang No. 1 High School.

== Life ==
Zhu was born in Ningxiang, Hunan, in 1883, during the Qing dynasty (1644–1911).

Zhu Jianfan studied at Kōbun Institute in Japan in his early years. After returning to China, he relinquished his family property to build a school in 1905.

In 1911, Zhu Jianfan led students to participate in anti-Qing revolutionary activities and called on the Hunan New Army to rise up in response to the Wuchang Uprising. After the Revolution of 1911, Zhou Jiachun changed his name to Zhu Jianfan. In 1919, Zhu Jianfan joined the May Fourth Movement. In 1920, he participated in the struggle to expel the warlord Zhang Jingyao. In September 1920, he invited Mao Zedong, then the principal of the primary school attached to Hunan Normal University, to live in the school to discuss the situation and funded Mao Zedong to establish the Cultural Bookstore.

In 1920, Zhu Jianfan was elected as a provincial councillor and participated in the first National Congress of the Kuomintang. He later served as a member of the Standing Committee of the Kuomintang Changsha Municipal Party Committee, a member of the Hunan Provincial Government, and the director of the Changsha Municipal Preparatory Office.

In 1926, Zhu Jianfan took the opportunity of the Northern Expedition to return to Changsha from Guangzhou and served as a member of the Standing Committee of the Kuomintang Changsha Municipal Party Committee, and served as the director of the Changsha Municipal Preparatory Office and the director of the Changsha Municipal Public Security Bureau. After the establishment of the municipal government, he served as the mayor. After the April 12 Incident in 1927, Zhu Jianfan organized a meeting in the provincial capital to denounce Chiang Kai-shek's counter-revolutionary crimes and served as the chairman of the meeting. After the Changsha coup in 1927, Zhu Jianfan was raided and wanted by the Kuomintang authorities.

In 1928, Zhu Jianfan went to Japan again. In 1930, Zhu Jianfan returned to Shanghai and followed Soong Ching Ling, Lu Xun and others to initiate the organization of the Freedom Movement Alliance and participated in the underground affairs of the Chinese Communist Party. In the summer of 1932, Zhu Jianfan died of stomach cancer. He was first buried in Shanghai Cemetery and then moved to Beijing Babaoshan Revolutionary Cemetery in 1953.

== Family ==
Zhu had five sons and three daughters, in order of birth:

- Zhu Fogen (朱佛根), wife of Tan Renyi (谭仁义).
- Zhu Boshen, director-general of the Department of Europe and America at the Ministry of Foreign Affairs.
- Zhu Xueyi (朱学伊)
- Zhu Zhongzhi, wife of Xiao Jinguang.
- Zhu Jue (朱觉), in 1932, he was killed during the Great Purge of the Party at the age of 21.
- Zhu Shuping (朱叔平), director of the Fourth Front Army Arsenal of the Red Army, died in combat in 1931.
- Zhu Jingzhi (朱竟之), director of Guangdong Provincial Commerce Department.
- Zhu Zhongli, wife of Wang Jiaxiang.
