= 25th Golden Eagle Awards =

Chinese TV awards ceremony in 2010

The 25th Golden Eagle Awards were held September 21, 2010, in Changsha, Hunan province. Nominees and winners are listed below, winners are in bold.

== Television series ==
=== Best Television Series ===
- **Liberation**/**解放**
- Latent/潜伏
- Mavin's War/马文的战争
- My Youthfulness/我的青春谁做主
- The Wind From North/北风那个吹
- Brother's Happiness/老大的幸福
- Women Country/女人的村庄
- Wang Gui and Anna/王贵与安娜
- Bruce Lee/李小龙传奇
- Going to West Gate/走西口
- My Brother Shunliu/我的兄弟叫顺溜
- Summer of the Year/那年·夏天
- A Beautiful Daughter-in-law Era/媳妇的美好时代

=== Best Directing for a Television Series ===
- **Li Sanlin for Going to West Gate**

=== Best Writing for a Television Series ===
- **Jiang Wei for Latent**

=== Audience's Choice for Actor ===
- **Sun Honglei for Latent**
- **Huang Haibo for A Beautiful Daughter-in-law Era**
- **Fan Wei for Brother's Happiness**
- **Wang Ji for Red Cradle**
- Zhang Jian for Summer of the year

=== Audience's Choice for Actress ===
- **Yan Ni for The Wind From North**
- **Hai Qing for A Beautiful Daughter-in-law Era**
- **Wang Qianhua for Women Country**
- **Yao Chen for Latent**

=== Best Art Direction for a Television Series ===
- **Wang Cuiyun for Empire Qin**

=== Best Cinematography for a Television Series ===
- **Cui Weidong for Once Upon Time of China**

=== Best Lighting for a Television Series ===
- **Zheng Zili for Once Upon Time of China**

=== Most Popular Actor ===
- **Sun Honglei for Latent**

=== Most Popular Actress ===
- **Hai Qing for A Beautiful Daughter-in-law Era**

== Literature & Art Program ==
=== Best Literature and Art Program ===
- **2010 CCTV New Year's Gala/2010年中央电视台春节联欢晚会**
- The 6th Golden Eagle Art Festival Opening Gala/第六届金鹰节开幕式晚会
- Name of Life - Sichuan Earthquake Special Program/以生命的名义—四川省抗震救灾大型特别节目
- Tiantianxiangshang/天天向上
- 2010 Beijing TV Globle Spring Festival Gala/2010BTV环球春晚
- 2010 Farmer's Sprince Festival Gala/亿万农民的笑声—2010年全国农民春节晚会
- The Golden Mic Award/2008中国播音主持金话筒奖颁奖典礼
- China 60-Year Anniversary Evening Gala/祖国万岁—庆祝中华人民共和国成立60周年大型文艺晚会

=== Best Directing for a Literature and Art Program ===
- **Zhang Xiaohai for China 60 Years National Day Special Program**

=== Best Cinematography for a Literature and Art Program ===
- **Cinematography group for China 60 Years National Day Special Program**

=== Best Art Direction for a Literature and Art Program ===
- **Art direction group for 2010 CCTV New Year's Gala**

== Children & Teens Program ==
=== Best Animation ===
- **Romance of the Three Kingdoms/三国演义**
- Monkey King/美猴王
- 2010 Beijing TV Animated Spring Festival Gala/2010年北京电视台动画春晚
- Pleasant Goat Sports Game/羊羊运动会
- Young Yue Yun/中华小岳云
- Divergence/三岔口

== Documentary Program ==
=== Best Television Documentary ===
- **Changan Street/长安街**
- Great Three Gorges Project /大三峡
- Great Parade-Flashing Back 60 Years/大阅兵—回首60年
- I Love You, China/我爱你，中国
- The Sichuan Road/蜀道
- Great Qinling Mountains /大秦岭
- Files-Secret Flying/《档案》之《绝密飞行》
- Idea of Thousands Years/千古之策
- Red Runway/红跑道
- Great Wall/长城内外

=== Best Writing and Directing for a Television Documentary ===
- **Writing & directing group of Ten Years of Macau**

=== Best Cinematography for a Television Documentary ===
- **Cinematography group of Changan Street**
