= Royal Nirvana =

2019 Chinese television series

- Traditional Chinese: 鶴唳華亭
- Simplified Chinese: 鹤唳华亭
- Hanyu Pinyin: Hèlì Huátíng
- Genre: Historical fiction Political
- Based on: He Li Hua Ting by Xue Man Liang Yuan
- Written by: Xue Man Liang Yuan
- Directed by: Yang Wenjun
- Starring: Luo Jin; Li Yitong
- Country of origin: China
- Original language: Mandarin
- No. of episodes: 60

Production
- Executive producer: Wu Ruoyan
- Producers: Mei Zixiao; Huang Yilong
- Production locations: Xiangshan Film and Television Town, Zhejiang; Wuxi, Jiangsu; Inner Mongolia; Dunhuang, Gansu
- Production companies: Youku, Fei Fan Xiang, China Wit Media, Alibaba Pictures, Saren Media

Original release
- Network: Youku
- Release: November 12, 2019

Royal Nirvana (Chinese: 鹤唳华亭) is a 2019 Chinese television series based on the novel of the same name by Xue Man Liang Yuan. It stars Luo Jin and Li Yitong. It started airing on Youku from November 12, 2019.

== Synopsis ==
Crown Prince Xiao Dingquan lost his mother and sister at a young age and his father, the Emperor, is distant towards him because he is backed by his maternal uncle General Gu and the army he controls. He lives on tenterhooks, fearful of losing the handful of people who are close to him. His father is a formidable figure whom he both respects and fears. Even as he strives to receive his love and approval, he is also afraid of the inevitable crushing disappointment if he fails.

Firstborn Prince Qi has designs on the throne and conspires against Dingquan with the help of his father-in-law, the powerful Chancellor Li Baizhou. They cause harm to befall the people he cherishes and widen the rift between the Emperor and Dingquan.

Teacher Lu Shiyu who is strongly influenced by Confucian values is a fatherly figure to Dingquan. He summons his student Lu Ying back to the capital with the intention of recommending the latter’s daughter Lu Wenxi to be the Crown Princess so as to help Dingquan gain an upright and trustworthy ally in court. Dingquan and Wenxi meet by chance when her brother gets into trouble and they develop mutual admiration although Dingquan has never seen what she looks like.

When Wenxi’s father and brother are thrown into jail, Wenxi goes undercover as a maid in the Crown Prince’s residence to help them. In the process, she quietly supports Dingquan to resolve two cases. Together, the couple manages to redress Wenxi’s father and brother’s case and bring the villains to justice. They are each other’s pillar of support as they brave dangers and make sacrifices to bring peace to the country.

== Cast ==
=== Main ===
Actor	Character	Introduction
Luo Jin	Xiao Dingquan	Crown Prince. Third prince of Southern Qi. He yearns for his father's love but is feared and suppressed due to his position.
Li Yitong	Lu Wenxi (Abao)	High ranking official Lu Ying's daughter. She is the woman Xiao Dingquan loved. She disguises as a maidservant and sneaks into the palace to seek revenge for her family’s death.

=== Supporting ===
==== Royal family ====
Actor	Character	Introduction
Huang Zhizhong	Xiao Ruijian	Emperor of Northern Qi. Previously the Prince of Ning.
Wang Yuanke	Gu Siqing	Deceased Empress of Northern Qi. Gu Silin's younger sister. Xiao Dingquan's mother.
Miao Pu	Noble Consort Zhao	Daughter of Zhao Yong, the Count of Anping. Mother of Xiao Dingtang and Xiao Dingkai.
Zhao Yuanyuan	Noble Lady Song	
Jin Han	Xiao Dingtang	Prince of Qi. Eldest prince of Northern Qi. An extremely ambitious man who schemes in order to claim the title of the Crown Prince. He is favored by the King. He frames Xiao Dingquan of killing Lu Ying.
Lu Yanqi	Princess Consort of Qi	Li Baizhou's daughter. She is hot-tempered.
Xin Peng	Xiao Dingkai	Prince of Zhao. Fifth prince of Northern Qi. He also in love with Lu Wenxi.

==== Officials ====
Actor	Character	Introduction
Wang Jinsong	Lu Shiyu	Minister of personnel. Grand tutor. Xiao Dingquan's teacher, who provides him guidance and advice.
Zhang Zhijian	Li Baizhou	Head of the secretariat. Xiao Dingtang's father-in-law.
Terry Chiu Hsin-Chih	Lu Ying	Palace assistant secretary.
Bao Daozhi	Zhang Luzheng	Minister of justice.
Alan Liu Te-Kai	Gu Silin	Marquis of Wude. Xiao Dingquan's uncle. He wields great military power.

==== Others ====
Actor	Character	Introduction
Zheng Yecheng	Gu Feng'en	Count of Jiayi. Gu Silin's son.
Liu Yitong	Lu Wenpu	Lu Ying's son.
Cheng Xiaomeng	Zhang Nianzhi	Zhang Luzheng's daughter.
Dong Chunhui	Zhang Shaoyun	Zhang Luzheng's son.
Wang Yu	Xu Changping	
Liu Hailan	Xixiang	A palace maid.
Hao Lei	Lady Zhang	A palace maid of the deceased empress.
Wang Ruizi	Lady Wu	A palace maid of the service bureau. Lady Zhang's daughter.

== Soundtrack ==
No.	Title	Lyrics	Music	Singer(s)	Length
1.	"Leave the Secular World (出尘)" (Opening theme)	Duan Sisi	Tan Xuan	Kim Jimun
2.	"Wish to Have Your Heart (愿得一人心)" (Ending theme)	Yin Yue	Qian Lei	Zhou Shen
3.	"Picture of Crane (放鹤图)" (Interlude)	Liu Chang	Tan Xuan	Zhou Shen
4.	"Crane and Fire (鹤·焰)" (Interlude)	Yin Yue	Yin Yue, Sa Dingding	Sa Dingding

== Production ==
The series is produced and directed by Yang Wenjun (Happy Memories of the Ma's; Best Director winner at Shanghai Television Festival). It is written by Xue Man Liang Yuan, the author of the original novel. Other notable cast members include style director William Chang and art director Chen Haozhong (Empresses in the Palace, Eternal Love).

The series began filming in May 2018 at Xiangshan Film and Television Town, and wrapped up in January 2019 at Dunhuang. Filming also took place in Wuxi and Inner Mongolia.

== Reception ==
Douban gave the drama 7.1 out of 10 out of more than 57,000 user reviews.

== Awards and nominations ==
Award	Category	Nominee	Results	Ref.
Golden Bud - The Fourth Network Film And Television Festival	Best Web Series	Royal Nirvana	Nominated	
Golden Bud - The Fourth Network Film And Television Festival	Top Ten Web Series	Royal Nirvana	Won	
Golden Bud - The Fourth Network Film And Television Festival	Quality Director of the Year	Yang Wenjun	Won	
Golden Bud - The Fourth Network Film And Television Festival	Best Actor	Luo Jin	Nominated	
Golden Bud - The Fourth Network Film And Television Festival	Best Actor	Wang Jinsong	Nominated	
Golden Bud - The Fourth Network Film And Television Festival	Best Actor	Jin Han	Nominated	
Golden Bud - The Fourth Network Film And Television Festival	Best Actress	Li Yitong	Nominated	
Golden Bud - The Fourth Network Film And Television Festival	Most Promising Actor	Zheng Yecheng	Won	
Sina Film & TV Award Ceremony	Top Ten Television Series		Won	
26th Shanghai Television Festival	Best Cinematography	Gan Yunquan	Nominated	
26th Shanghai Television Festival	Best Art Direction	Chen Haozhong	Nominated	
29th Huading Award	Best Actor	Luo Jin	Pending	
29th Huading Award	Best Actress	Li Yitong	Pending	
