= Diamond Lover =

- Genre: Romance; Drama; Workplace
- Written by: Li Jian
- Directed by: Chen Mingzhang; Wu Qiang
- Starring: Rain; Tiffany Tang; Luo Jin; Dilraba Dilmurat
- Opening theme: "Diamond Lover" by Rain
- Ending theme: "Pretend" by Rain
- Country of origin: China
- Original language: Mandarin
- No. of episodes: 24 USA/China 68

Production
- Executive producers: Liu Yang; Wu Hao
- Production locations: China, South Korea
- Running time: 45 minutes
- Production companies: DMG Media; Dongkai Film Investment

Original release
- Network: JZTV, AHTV
- Release: July 22 – August 24, 2015

Diamond Lover (Chinese: 克拉恋人; pinyin: Kèlā liànrén) is a 2015 Chinese television series starring Rain, Tiffany Tang, Luo Jin and Dilraba Dilmurat. It premiered simultaneously on Zhejiang Television and Anhui Television on July 22, 2015. The drama is a commercial success in China, with a peak rating of 1.249 and more than 3.3 billion views online.

== Synopsis ==
Due to her obesity, Mi Mei Li has low self-esteem and suffers in both her work and life. One day, she meets Xiao Liang, CEO of a diamond company, and falls in love with him. However, due to circumstances, she isn't able to confess her feelings to him. A car accident then changed her fate. After cosmetic surgery, the once obese Mei Li becomes a slim beauty and also changes her name to Mi Duo so no one from her past can recognize her. However, after suffering setbacks in both her relationship and career, she realizes that her physical appearance is not a "free pass" to love. She is no longer bothered about how she looks and sets her mind on becoming an accomplished jewelry designer. Her optimism attracts Xiao Liang, and he falls in love with her. At the same time, her good friend Lei Yiming, who has always stayed by her side, also confesses to her.

== Cast ==
=== Main ===
Actor	Character	Introduction
Rain	Xiao Liang	President of Tesiro Diamond. Due to his family background, he is cold to people and does not believe in love. Rain spoke in Korean for the role and was dubbed over in Mandarin.
Tiffany Tang	Mi Mei Li/Mi Duo	An aspiring jewelry designer. Due to her obese appearance, she once suffered from low self-esteem. After her transformation, she turns into a more confident person.
Luo Jin	Lei Yiming	A professional gynecologist. Kind-hearted, chivalrous, and easygoing, Yiming was the only one who befriended the obese Mi Duo when they were younger and stayed by her side as a best friend.
Dilraba Dilmurat	Gao Wen	A famous celebrity, and spokesperson of Tesiro Diamond. She appears haughty and proud but is lonely deep down.

=== Supporting ===
Actor	Character	Introduction
Yao Yichen	Lin Ziliang	Xiao Liang's stepbrother, the vice president of Tesiro Diamond. He plots to take over Xiao Liang's company.
Guo Keliang	Liu Siyuan	Tesiro Diamond's jewelry designer. She uses Ziliang to secure her career but falls in love with him, and stays by his side to help him with his plans to take over Xiao Liang's company.
Zhang Wen	Ye Qi	Xiao Liang's ex-girlfriend, CEO of Seven7 Baby. In order to win Xiao Liang's heart, she would resort to anything.
Wang Dong	Shen Dongjun	Tesiro Diamond's executive. He likes Gao Wen.
Xue Qi	Zhu Xiangnan	Siyuan's ex-boyfriend. Due to his laziness and incapability, Si Yuan broke up with him.
Yang Ya	Sun Feifei	Daughter of the CEO of Blue Flame. She likes Xiao Liang.
Bai Fan	Xiao Zhendong	Xiao Liang and Ziliang's father.
Hou Xuelong	Qi Yu	Xiao Liang's assistant.
Guo Jinglin	Xue'er	Mi Duo and Siyuan's colleague. A mean person.
Bo Fangjun	Han Lin	Gao Wen's ex-boyfriend who betrayed her due to his own interests.
Ding Liuyan	Xiao Min	A fellow doctor who likes Yiming.
Zhu Weiwei	Xiao Liang's mother	
Lu Zhong	Ziliang's birth father	
Wang Yunbo	Gao Wen's assistant	
Chen Yalan	Tina	Mi Duo's superior
Du Juan	Wang Youyou	Tesiro Diamond's designer, Mi Duo's colleague
Chen Shu	Fang Wenxi	

== Soundtrack ==
Title	Singer
Diamond Lover (克拉恋人)	Rain
Pretend (假装)	Rain
Everytime I Am Heartbroken (每一次让人心碎的)	Ivy Yan Luo Jin
I Do (我愿意)	Ivy Yan Luo Jin
If I Promise You (如果我答应你)	Ivy Yan Luo Jin
Bling Bling	Ivy Yan Luo Jin
No Logic (没道理)	Ivy Yan Luo Jin
Single Heart (单心)	Ivy Yan Luo Jin

- Diamond Lover and Pretend are co-written and co-composed by Rain.

== Ratings ==
Drama info		Zhejiang TV CSM50 City ratings			Anhui TV CSM50 City ratings		
Broadcast date	Episode	Ratings (%)	Audience share (%)	Rank	Ratings (%)	Audience share (%)	Rank
July 22, 2015	1-2	0.831	2.458	4	0.246	0.73	17
July 23, 2015	3-4	0.912	2.796	4	0.245	0.731	17
July 24, 2015	5-6	0.873	2.672	3	0.433	1.311	10
July 25, 2015	7-8	0.694	2.348	3	0.558	1.744	6
July 26, 2015	9-10	0.905	2.703	3	0.545	1.63	7
July 27, 2015	11-12	0.86	2.461	3	0.668	1.96	5
July 28, 2015	13-14	0.951	2.812	3	0.684	2.024	5
July 29, 2015	15-16	0.965	2.868	3	0.706	2.11	4
July 30, 2015	17-18	0.990	2.924	3	0.584	1.728	7
July 31, 2015	19-20	1.068	3.26	2	0.669	1.99	4
August 1, 2015	21-22	1.029	3.3	2	0.605	1.85	5
August 2, 2015	23-24	0.93	2.768	3	0.646	1.928	5
August 3, 2015	25-26	1.013	2.98	3	0.702	2.06	5
August 4, 2015	27-28	1.029	3.06	3	0.675	2.01	6
August 5, 2015	29-30	1.124	3.33	2	0.695	2.06	4
August 6, 2015	31-32	1.299	3.82	2	0.777	2.3	3
August 7, 2015	33-34	1.378	3.81	1	0.961	2.66	2
August 8, 2015	35-36	1.272	3.73	1	0.701	2.08	7
August 9, 2015	37-38	1.234	3.44	2	0.814	2.28	4
August 10, 2015	39-40	1.155	3.247	2	0.766	2.159	6
August 11, 2015	41-42	0.975	2.813	2	0.711	2.055	7
August 12, 2015	43-44	1.055	3.088	2	0.758	2.224	5
August 13, 2015	45-46	1.162	3.31	2	0.656	1.87	6
August 14, 2015	47-48	1.2	3.47	1	0.714	2.05	7
August 15, 2015	49-50	1.192	3.44	1	0.775	2.25	6
August 16, 2015	51-52	1.252	3.576	2	0.782	2.247	6
August 17, 2015	53-54	1.327	3.712	2	0.852	2.388	6
August 18, 2015	55-56	1.249	3.506	2	0.833	2.345	6
August 19, 2015	57-58	1.429	3.95	2	0.86	2.38	5
August 20, 2015	59-60	1.178	3.45	2	0.791	2.32	6
August 21, 2015	61-62	1.305	3.79	1	0.799	2.31	6
August 22, 2015	63-64	1.354	3.89	1	0.947	2.74	3
August 23, 2015	65-66	1.322	3.595	2	0.93	2.547	4
August 24, 2015	67-68	1.523	4.19	2	1.071	2.953	3
Average ratings	/	1.118	3.251	/	0.711	2.059	/

- Highest ratings are marked in red, lowest ratings are marked in blue

== Awards and nominations ==
Year	Award	Category	Nominated work	Result
2015	Chinese American Film Festival	Golden Angel Award for Outstanding TV Series		Won
2015	5S Golden Category Award Ceremony	IP Sales Award		Won
2016	7th China TV Drama Awards	Top Ten Most Television Series		Won
2016	7th China TV Drama Awards	Best New Actress	Dilraba Dilmurat	Won
2016	7th China TV Drama Awards	Audience's Favorite Character	Mi Duo (Tiffany Tang)	Won
2017	11th National Top-Notch Television Production Award Ceremony	Outstanding Television Series		Won

== International broadcast ==
Channel	Country	Date	Notes
KSCI	United States	October 23, 2015	
ON TV	Taiwan	December 21, 2015	
Talentvision	Canada	February 15, 2016	
Videoland	Taiwan	May 19, 2016	
8TV	Malaysia	June 8, 2016	
NOW26	Thailand	September 12, 2016	
Singtel TV	Singapore	October 25, 2016	
DATV	Japan	November 2, 2016	
