= Yuan Huiqin =

Chinese Peking opera performer (born 1965)

- Born: October 6, 1965 (age 60); Yichang, Hubei, China
- Education: National Academy of Chinese Theatre Arts
- Occupation: Peking opera performer
- Years active: 1991–present
- Employer: China National Peking Opera Company
- Known for: Old dan roles
- Style: Li (Li Duokui) school
- Spouse: Jin Xuebin (靳学斌) (died 2011)

Chinese name
- Chinese: 袁慧琴
Transcriptions
Standard Mandarin
- Hanyu Pinyin: Yuán Huìqín

Yuan Huiqin (born 6 October 1965) is a Chinese Peking opera performer who specializes in old dan (female) roles. She is currently the vice-president of China National Peking Opera Company.

== Repertoire (incomplete) ==
English title	Original title	Role	Notes
Exchanging a Leopard Cat for a Prince	狸貓換太子	Consort Li	
The Women Generals of the Yang Family	楊門女將	She Saihua	made into a 2005 film
Kou Zhun Forgoes the Banquet	寇準罷宴	Old maidservant	
Li Kui visits His Mother	李逵探母	Li Kui's mother	
Madam Yue Tattoos Her Son	岳母刺字	Yue Fei's mother	
Empress Dowager Cixi and Princess Der Ling	慈禧與徳龄	Empress Dowager Cixi	
The Heroic Khitan Empress	契丹英后	Xiao Yanyan	made into a 2001 TV series
Silver Spear	對花槍	Jiang Guizhi	made into a 2016 film
