= My Story for You =

- Drama poster
- Genre: Romance; Drama
- Based on: Love the Whole World by Tangjia Sanshao
- Written by: Mobao Feibao
- Directed by: Yu Cuihua; Guo Hu
- Starring: Luo Jin; Zheng Shuang
- Country of origin: China
- Original language: Mandarin
- No. of seasons: 1
- No. of episodes: 48

Production
- Executive producer: Teng Huatao
- Producer: Xiong Xiaoling
- Production locations: Shanghai, Beijing, New York
- Running time: 45 mins
- Production company: Croton Media (New Horizons)

Original release
- Network: iQiyi
- Release: June 18, 2018

My Story for You (Chinese: 为了你我愿意热爱整个世界) is a 2018 Chinese television series based on Tangjia Sanshao (唐家三少)'s novel of the same name; starring Luo Jin and Zheng Shuang. The story is based on the author's real-life story on his struggles and hardships before he became a famous novelist, as well as his romance with his wife. The series premiered on June 18, 2018 via iQiyi.

The series received positive reviews for its heart-warming and relatable story.

== Synopsis ==
In 1998, Zhang Changgong gets his first taste of success as a developer in an IT company. At the same time, he meets and falls in love with Li Muzi, a kind and intelligent university student. Unfortunately the IT industry soon faces an economic crisis, and Zhang Changgong is left unemployed. With the help of his friends and family, Changgong faces the challenges head on, and eventually becomes a top-selling author.

To court her, he wrote 137 love letters in a year, exceeding 1 million Chinese characters. To guard her, he created 16 novels with more than 40 million words, working a wonder of internet literature. This is the love story that unfolded for 16 years already between Tang Jian Shao and his wife. ~ Novel Summary

== Cast ==
=== Main ===
Actor	Character	Introduction
Luo Jin	Zhang Changgong	A man with a never-say-die spirit.
Zheng Shuang	Li Muzi	Only daughter of a wealthy military family. Kind and pure, she stays by Zhang Changgong's side and weather all sorts of storms with him.

=== Supporting ===
==== People around Zhang Changgong ====
Actor	Character	Introduction
Pang Hanchen	Han Dong	A rebellious youth who later becomes an intelligent and capable business executive. Zhang Changgong's good friend, who also likes Zhang Yaoyao.
Zhang Yishang	Zhang Yaoyao	Zhang Changgong's sister. A passionate and unrestrained lady who is unyielding in love.
Wang Gongliang	Li Ningfeng	A kind, strict but obtuse policeman, Zhang Yaoyao's husband.
Yang Jincheng	Wei Xiaoshan	Zhang Changgong's good friend. A gentle, loyal and caring man.
Li Yiyi	Xiao Ai	Zhang Changgong's high school classmate and first love.
Qin Yiming	Liu Mingtao	Zhang Changgong's good friend. He is ambitious and eager for success, thus causing him to walk on the wrong path.
Jin Hao	Li Song	Zhang Changgong's good friend and colleague, whom met him through an online platform.
Kong Lin	Du Juan	Zhang Changgong's mother. An overbearing and imposing woman.
Luo Gang	Li Chun	Zhang Changgong's father. An honest and dependable man.
Mu Fengbin	CEO Lin	Zhang Changgong's superior.

==== People around Li Muzi ====
Actor	Character	Introduction
Ren Shen	Xiao Qiu	Li Muzi's roommate and close friend.
Du Zhiguo		Li Muzi's grandfather.
Cai Gang		Li Muzi's father.
Juan Zi		Li Muzi's mother.
Gao Shuguang		Li Muzi's uncle.

==== Others ====
Actor	Character	Introduction
Sun Jialing	Mei Xin	
Song Nanxi	Lin Mian	
Chen Shuai	Xiao Gong	
Xie Ningmeng	Chong Jiayou	
Zhang Wei		Han Dong's close friend.
Huang Yuecheng	Wei Ming	
Huang Jingyu	Changgong Wei	Special appearance.

== Soundtrack ==
No.	Title	Lyrics	Music	Singers	Length
1.	"My Dream (我的梦)" (Opening theme song)	Wang Haitao; Jane Zhang	Andy Love	Jane Zhang
2.	"Beautiful Mood (美丽心情)"	Yiu Him	Miyuki Nakajima	Liu Xijun
3.	"Superstar of the Chaotic Era (乱世巨星)"	Wasabi	Ronald Ng	Zhang Hexuan
4.	"Intuition (直觉)"	Yiu Him	Eric Chen	Hu Xia
5.	"Thank You For Your Love 1999 (谢谢你的爱1999)"	Lin Linan	Chen Junting	Li Hao
6.	"Love the Whole World (热爱整个世界)"	Huang Yuli	Huang Yuli	Reno Wang
7.	"Love a Girl Nicely (好好爱个女孩)" (Ending theme song)	Xiao Ke	Xiao Ke	Jeff Chang

== Production ==
The series is directed by Yu Cuihua (Love O2O, Eternal Love), written by Mobao Feibao (Scarlet Heart, My Sunshine) and produced by Xiong Xiaoling (Love O2O, My Sunshine). Other notable cast members include Teng Huatao (Dwelling Narrowness, Fu Chen) as its executive producer and Di Kun (To Be a Better Man) as its artistic director.

Tangjia Sanshao, the original author of the novel, acts as the promotional ambassador of the series. This is the first cross-over collaboration between entertainment media (television) and literary work.

The series was filmed in Shanghai, Beijing and New York from April to August 2017.

== Awards and nominations ==
Award	Category	Nominated work	Result	Ref.
Canada China International Film Festival	Best TV Series	My Story for You	Won	
Influence of Recreational Responsibilities Awards	Web Drama of the Year	My Story for You	Won	
中国电视媒体综合实力大型调研	Outstanding Drama of the Year	My Story for You	Won	
Golden Bud - The Third Network Film And Television Festival	Top 10 Web Drama	My Story for You	Won	
