= Daotian Middle School =

- 稻田中学

Location
- No. 121, Shazitang Road, Yuhua District; Changsha, Hunan, 410007; China
- Coordinates: 28°10′50″N 112°59′21″E

Information
- Type: Comprehensive Public High School
- Motto: Chinese: 志诚仁爱 (Ambition, Sincerity, Benevolence, Love)
- Established: 12 May 1912; 113 years ago
- Founders: Zhu Jianfan
- Grades: 7 to 12
- Gender: coed
- Enrollment: 3,000
- Campus type: Urban

Daotian Middle School (simplified Chinese: 稻田中学; traditional Chinese: 稻田中學; pinyin: Dàotián Zhōngxué), also known as Daotian (稻田), is public secondary school located in Changsha, Hunan Province, People's Republic of China. It has both junior (7-9th grade) and senior (10-12th grade) divisions, and the junior division is a branch of Yali High School.

The school was founded in 1912 by educator Zhu Jianfan as Hunan First Women's Normal School. It was destroyed by the Wenxi Fire in 1938 and reopened as a co-educational institution in 1995.

== Name ==
The school was established in the Ancient Rice Fields (古稻田) near Tianxin Pavilion, Changsha. As the school changed its name several times, moved, and merged frequently, the name of "Daotian" is often mentioned in order to distinguish it from other schools. In 1992, the reestablished school was named as Daotian Middle School.

== History ==
In 1909, Wu Qingdi, the Hunan Provincial Education Commissioner, petitioned to establish the Hunan Women's Normal School, which was approved by the Governor's Office. More than 200 acres of official land was allocated to build the school, which was completed in the autumn of 1911.

The school opened on May 12, 1912, and was named the Hunan First Women's Normal School (Chinese: 湖南省立第一女子師範學校; pinyin: Húnán Shěnglì Dìyī Nǚzǐ Shīfàn Xuéxiào) by the Hunan provincial government of the Republic of China. The first principal was Zhu Jianfan. In 1915, due to the reduction of education funds, the second and third women's normal schools in Xiangxi and Hunan were merged and renamed Hunan Women's Normal School (Chinese: 湖南省女子師範學校; pinyin: Húnánshěng Nǚzǐ Shīfàn Xuéxiào). In August 1916, the three schools were reopened.

In 1925, Xu Teli served as the principal and Chinese teacher. In May 1927, after the Changsha coup, the school was closed for half a year. In the winter of 1927, the provincial government merged the senior divisions of various middle schools, including Hunan First Women's Normal School, to form Hunan Senior High School (Chinese: 湖南省高級中學; pinyin: Húnánshěng Gāojí Zhōngxué), and Hunan First Women's Normal School was turned into Hunan Junior High School (Chinese: 湖南省立初級中學; pinyin: Húnán Shěnglì Chūjí Zhōngxué). Wang Jifan was appointed as the principal. In February 1928, Hunan Junior High School was turned into Hunan Second Middle School (Chinese: 湖南省立第二中學; pinyin: Húnán Shěnglì Dìèr Zhōngxué).

In 1934, Hunan Second Middle School was renamed Hunan Changsha Women's Middle School (Chinese: 湖南省立長沙女子中學; pinyin: Húnán Shěnglì Chǎngshā Nǚzǐ Zhōngxué). In November 1938, Changsha Wenxi Fire broke out, and the school moved to Xiangtan.

On December 14, 1992, it was approved to rebuild the middle school, named Daotian Middle School. On September 1, 1995, the school opened as planned.

== Notable people ==
=== Teacher ===
- Xu Teli: Chinese revolutionary and educator, teacher of Mao Zedong and Tian Han.
- Tian Han: Chinese playwright, opera writer, film script writer, novelist, poet, lyricist of the national anthem of the People's Republic of China.
- Yang Bojun: linguist, professor of history at Peking University, and director of the Chinese Linguistic Society.

=== Alumni ===
- Yang Kaihui: daughter of Yang Changji and Mao Zedong's second wife. She has three sons, namely Mao Anying, Mao Anqing and Mao Anylong.
- Xiang Jingyu: one of the founders and early leaders of the Chinese Communist Party (CCP), leader of the women's movement.
- Miao Boying: Chinese women's movement activist and early figure of the CCP.
- Liu Ying: member of the Standing Committee of the National Committee of the Chinese People's Political Consultative Conference, and wife of Zhang Wentian.
- Li Shuyi: Wife of Liu Zhixun of the CCP.
- Xie Bingying: professor of Chinese literature, National Taiwan Normal University.
- Bai Wei: Chinese writer.
