= Return to Dust (film) =

2022 Chinese drama film

- Official poster
- Traditional Chinese: 隱入塵煙
- Simplified Chinese: 隐入尘烟
- Literal meaning: Hidden in the Smoke
- Hanyu Pinyin: Yǐn rù chényān
- Directed by: Li Ruijun
- Written by: Li Ruijun
- Produced by: Zhang Min; Li Yan
- Starring: Wu Renlin; Hai Qing
- Cinematography: Wang Weihua
- Edited by: Li Ruijun
- Music by: Peyman Yazdanian
- Production company: Hucheng No.7 Films
- Release dates: February 2022 (Berlinale); 8 July 2022 (China)
- Running time: 133 minutes
- Country: China
- Language: Rural Gansu dialect of Mandarin Chinese
- Box office: $866,836

Return to Dust (Chinese: 隐入尘烟; pinyin: Yǐn rù chényān) is a Chinese drama film written and directed by Li Ruijun. It had its world premiere at the 2022 Berlinale. The film, which runs to 133 minutes, is mainly spoken in a rural Gansu dialect. It premiered in the UK at the Edinburgh International Film Festival, in August 2022, and saw a general release in November. As of September 2022, it had grossed 100 million yuan (US$14 million) at the box office, on a budget of 2 million yuan.

Return to Dust was pulled from streaming services in China on 26 September 2022. Western news outlets such as Radio Free Asia reported that mentioning the film on Weibo had been banned. It was later reported by the South China Morning Post that discussion of the film had not been prohibited on Chinese social media, but the reason for its removal from streaming services had not been made clear. Other sources later reported that posts about the film were blocked on Weibo, suggesting that there was a ban on mentioning it. Prior to its recall, a version of the film with an alternative ending was available.

== Synopsis ==
The story follows the lives of Ma Youtie and Cao Guiying in rural Gansu throughout the year of 2011. Guiying is a disabled, incontinent, and infertile middle-aged woman who has been mistreated by her family, and is past the normal age by which women are normally expected to be married in rural China. Youtie is a middle-aged poor farmer who lives a simple life. Their families arrange for the two to marry, and the couple gradually develops an emotional closeness and tenderness. They lead a simple life, farming with their donkey. There are many empty properties in their village, and they move into one of them.

However, the owner, who had migrated to Shenzhen in search of work, unexpectedly returns after finding out about a government incentive granting substantial cash payment to homeowners who allow their poorly built and unoccupied houses to be demolished. Youtie and Guiying move to another unoccupied property, before they decide to build their own homestead. They use mud bricks that they make themselves, and old wooden posts salvaged from previous demolitions.

In the meantime, a powerful local businessman requires blood transfusions. Youtie is told that he shares the same rare blood type and is frequently called to donate blood to save the businessman's life. In return for his donations, the businessman's wealthy family offers Youtie cheap gifts, which he only accepts as borrowed items. Youtie's brother suggests he and Guiying should move into a new apartment in a high-rise public housing building, but the couple find it impractical, because the apartment cannot house their farm animals.

Guiying becomes ill, and Youtie tells her to rest while he goes out to work. He is later shown passing a group of locals sitting unconcernedly by the irrigation canal. They tell him that Guiying had been looking for him to give him some food, but that she felt dizzy and fell into the water and drowned. Youtie is devastated and jumps into the canal to retrieve his wife's body.

Youtie quietly finishes his harvest in the coming days, then frees his faithful, hard-working donkey and sells all his possessions to settle his debts, keeping nothing aside as he would normally do for the coming season's planting. Even in this final transaction, Youtie is cheated by the buyer, who forces him to round down the price "to make the bookkeeping easier". When preparing Guiying's body for burial, Youtie presses some grains of corn to make a mark on her hand. In an earlier scene, Youtie had explained that he felt he could always feel close to her through this mark. Youtie takes some food and lies down, specially positioning his head at the side of the bed to be near to some smouldering charcoal. His body shakes uncontrollably. There is no clear evidence, but it is implied that he might have committed suicide. His few remaining belongings are shown being taken away in a handcart, while payment is made from a government official to Youtie's brother for permission to demolish the house that Youtie and Guiying had built and where they had lived happily for a brief period of time. The donkey is shown as having returned to the house by himself, but is ignored, unwanted by anyone.

The film became a target for China's censors, and some changes were imposed upon the ending. In his last scene, Youtie is not shown drinking poison, but a bottle is shown on the altar that he has made for Guiying. In the film's final scene, when the house is being demolished, one character says that Youtie will now be moving to his new apartment in the city, even though this makes little sense in the context of the previous scene, where it is implied that Youtie had died. Before the film was removed from streaming platforms in China, the revised version added a line of text at this point, before the credits begin, stating (in Chinese): "Ma Youtie moved to his new home in the winter of 2011 and started his new life with the help of the government and the warm-hearted villagers."

== Government censorship ==
The film was released in July 2022 in China, and by the first week of September, it ranked as the most successful film in cinemas, having been seen by close to 1.5 million viewers. Two weeks later, the film was removed from cinemas and Chinese streaming platforms. No explanation was provided by the government on the removal, and observers were left to speculate on the cause of the censorship. The success of the film was unexpected for a low-budget production. The film did not present any criticism of the Chinese political regime, but Chinese dissident artist Ai Weiwei described the censorship as predictable.

== Cast and crew ==
Wu Renlin	as Ma Youtie
Hai Qing	as Cao Guiying
Written, directed, and edited by	Li Ruijun
Cinematography	Wang Weihua
Music	Peyman Yazdanian
Sound	Wang Changrui
Production design	Li Ruijun, Han Dahai
Costumes	Wu Jingyin
Make-up	Wu Jingyin
Assistant director	Li Daiqing
Production manager	Zhao Shuai
Casting	Li RuiQi
Producers	Zhang Min, Li Yan
Executive producer	Qin Hong
Co-producers	Sun Yang, Feng Qiong, Wang Tianye, Zhao Yiyan
Co-production	Qizi Films, Beijing; Beijing J.Q. Spring Pictures, Beijing; Dream Media, Beijing; Aranya Pictures, Beijing; ShangHai Shigu Film, Shanghai; Han Zhou QinZiZai, Shanghai

== Production ==
In order to make the film, the cast and crew had to live in a remote town in the northwest of Gansu. Hai Qing, who is an acclaimed film star in China, actually lived with Wu Renlin, who is a local farmer and an untrained actor. Qing was taught the skills required to be a farmer and participated in the mud brick house building. She also learned the local dialect.

== Reception ==
On review aggregator Rotten Tomatoes, the film holds a score of 95%, based on 20 reviews, with an average rating of 7.8/10. Jessica Kiang of Variety described the film as "an absorbing, beautifully framed drama that makes a virtue — possibly too much a virtue — of simplicity." Anna Smith of Deadline Hollywood said of the film, "[It] isn’t always an easy watch, but it’s a thought-provoking one with beautifully judged performances that radiate warmth and encourage empathy. It marks Li Ruijun as a significant cinematic talent."

== Accolades ==
Year	Award	Category	Nominee(s)	Result	Ref.
2022	72nd Berlin International Film Festival	Golden Bear	Return to Dust	Nominated	
2022	67th Valladolid International Film Festival	Golden Spike		Won	
