= The Way We Were (2018 TV series) =

- Promotional poster
- Traditional Chinese: 歸去來
- Simplified Chinese: 归去来
- Hanyu Pinyin: Guīqùlaí
- Genre: Romance
- Written by: Gao Xuan; Ren Baoru
- Directed by: Liu Jiang
- Starring: Tiffany Tang; Luo Jin
- Country of origin: China
- Original language: Mandarin
- No. of seasons: 1
- No. of episodes: 50

Production
- Executive producer: Wang Tong
- Production locations: Beijing, China; San Francisco, Los Angeles, United States; Vancouver, Canada; Cambodia
- Production companies: Pengrui Film; Perfect World Pictures; Ruyi Entertainment; Khorgos Jixiangyingfang Entertainment; Shanghai Media &Entertainment Group; Film and TV Center of the Supreme People's Procuratorate of China; Shangxiang Xingzuo Entertainment

Original release
- Network: Beijing Television; Dragon Television
- Release: May 14 – June 10, 2018

The Way We Were (Chinese: 归去来) is a 2018 Chinese romance drama directed by Liu Jiang and starring Tiffany Tang and Luo Jin. The series airs on both Dragon Television and Beijing Television from 14 May 2018 to 10 June 2018. The series centers on the lives of Chinese overseas students in the United States.

== Synopsis ==
The story follows six Chinese students studying abroad in the U.S., chasing their dreams and becoming the elites of their respective majors. Shu Che and Miao Ying were originally a couple since middle school. Che left to study in America before Miao Ying since he was two years her senior. Both their parents forbade them from marrying when they were pursuing their post-grad degrees in America due to a major subway project that Che’s father, a mayor of Yan-zhou, had agreed to award the bid to Ying’s father through a corrupt underhanded agreement. From the opposition to their marriage, Che found out about his father’s corruption and Miao Ying’s father’s briberies. When Che turned his love interest to Xiao Qing after his failed relationship with Miao Ying, he never expected Xiao Qing’s father, an officer in the anti-corruption unit, will be the chief in charge of persecuting his father and Miao Ying’s father for bribery and corruption. Shu Che becomes involved in exposing his dad's criminal activity and shares his thoughts with Xiao Qing. When Xiao Qing’s father asks her to be the witness at trial, she is caught between being a witness and revealing the secret that Che shared with her. Ultimately, the culprit is revealed through investigations and evidence. There's a heavy price to pay for the culprits. Everyone matured in the process, understanding humanity and the value of life, and returning to the path of justice.

== Cast ==
=== Main ===
- Tiffany Tang as Xiao Qing (萧清)

An aspiring law practitioner.

- Luo Jin as Shu Che (书澈)

Son of a politician, and a law practitioner.

- Yu Jiwei as Ning Ming (宁鸣)

A guy with an ordinary background. His crush on Miao Ying spurs him to work hard in life.

- Xu Lingyue as Miao Ying (缪盈)

Shu Che's ex-girlfriend. A woman of outstanding family background and appearance.

- Wang Tianchen as Cheng Ran (成然)

Miao Ying's younger brother. A rebellious youth who has lacked familial love.

- Ma Chengcheng as Lü Ka (绿卡)

Cheng Ran's "wife", who conned him into a fake marriage due to her crush on him.

=== Supporting ===
- Wang Zhiwen as Shu Wang (书望), Shu Che's father. An ambitious politician with grey areas of income.
- Shi Ke as Yu Wen (毓文), Shu Che's mother.
- Zhang Xilin as Cheng Wei (成伟), Miao Ying's father.
- Shi Jingming as He Yan (何晏), Xiao Qing's father. An honest and upright prosecutor.
- Zhang Kaili as Xiao Yun (萧云), Xiao Qing's mother.
- Qu Shanshan as Liu Caiqi (刘彩琪)
- Gao Liwen as Monica (莫妮卡), Xiao Qing's landlord.
- Lily Ho as Catherine (凯瑟琳), Xiao Qing's roommate and Benjamin's girlfriend.
- Kent Leung as Benjamin (刘彩琪), Xiao Qing's roommate and Catherine's boyfriend.
- Shan Mingkai as Assistant Wang (本杰明), Shu Wang's assistant.
- Wang Ji as Monica's mother
- Xu Kaicheng as William (威廉)

== Soundtrack ==
No.	Title	Lyrics	Music	Singers	Length
1.	"The Way We Were (归去来)" (Theme song)	Chen Xi	Dong Dongdong	Tian Yuan
2.	"Bearing in Mind Constantly (念念不忘)" (Ending theme song)	Chen Xi	Dong Dongdong	Tian Yuan
3.	"Speak Up (开口)" (Interlude)	Chen Xi	Dong Dongdong	Victor Wong (male ver), Zheng Xingqi (female ver)
4.	"I'm Here (我在这里)" (Interlude)	Chen Xi	Dong Dongdong	Yu Jiwei (male ver), Tian Yuan (male ver)
5.	"Pain (痛)" (Interlude)	Chen Xi	Dong Dongdong	Liu Sihan

== Production ==
The series is directed by Liu Jiang (The Battle of Dawn) and written by Gao Xuan and Ren Baojia (My Youthfulness, Farewell Vancouver).

Principal photography began on 20 June 2017 and took place in various locations in the United States including Stanford University, University of Southern California, Los Angeles, San Francisco, and Las Vegas. Filming also took place in Beijing, Cambodia and Canada. The series wrapped up on December 6 of that same year.

== Ratings ==
CSM52 ratings
Air date	Dragon TV			Beijing TV		
Air date	Ratings (%)	Audience share (%)	Rank	Ratings (%)	Audience share (%)	Rank
2018.5.14	0.774	3.218	2	0.644	2.690	3
2018.5.15	0.813	3.180	2	0.680	2.662	3
2018.5.16	0.717	2.834	2	0.686	2.716	3
2018.5.17	0.731	2.862	2	0.674	2.648	3
2018.5.18	0.795	3.111	1	0.610	2.389	3
2018.5.19	0.746	2.949	1	0.721	2.850	2
2018.5.20	0.858	3.185	1	0.767	2.846	3
2018.5.21	0.824	3.122	2	0.689	2.611	3
2018.5.22	0.866	3.317	2	0.699	2.681	3
2018.5.23	0.908	3.645	2	0.720	2.896	3
2018.5.24	0.992	3.970	1	0.718	2.876	3
2018.5.25	1.022	3.934	1	0.676	2.663	2
2018.5.26	1.014	3.986	1	0.653	2.581	2
2018.5.27	1.056	4.038	1	0.706	2.703	3
2018.5.28	1.010	4.043	1	0.723	2.896	2
2018.5.29	0.944	3.644	1	0.790	3.051	2
2018.5.30	1.069	4.122	1	0.779	3.003	2
2018.5.31	1.119	4.330	1	0.766	2.960	2
2018.6.1	1.001	3.985	1	0.769	3.008	2
2018.6.2	0.981	4.086	1	0.700	2.927	2
2018.6.3	1.074	4.050	1	0.846	3.194	2
2018.6.4	1.156	4.486	1	0.762	2.971	2
2018.6.5	1.119	4.387	1	0.926	3.632	2
2018.6.6	1.055	4.152	1	0.929	3.665	2
2018.6.7	1.231	4.780	1	0.941	3.660	2
2018.6.8	1.200	4.665	1	1.060	4.121	2
2018.6.9	1.243	4.748	1	0.903	3.489	2
2018.6.10	1.378	5.422	1	1.024	3.993	2

- Highest ratings are marked in red, lowest ratings are marked in blue

== Awards and nominations ==
Award	Category	Nominated work	Result	Ref.
24th Huading Awards	Best Director	Liu Jiang	Won	
24th Huading Awards	Best Screenwriter	Gao Xuan, Ren Baoru	Won	
24th Huading Awards	Best Actress	Tiffany Tang	Nominated	
24th Huading Awards	Best Actor (Modern Drama)	Luo Jin	Nominated	
24th Huading Awards	Best Producer	Luo Xi, Wang Tong, Wang Weiyue	Nominated	
25th Shanghai Television Festival	Best Television Series		Nominated	
25th Shanghai Television Festival	Best Original Screenplay	Gao Xuan, Ren Baoru	Nominated	
Influence of Recreational Responsibilities Awards	TV Drama of the Year		Won	
中国电视媒体综合实力大型调研	Outstanding Drama of the Year		Won	
