= Bai Fan =

Chinese actor

- Born: May 4, 1962 (age 63); Chongqing, China
- Occupation: Actor
- Years active: 1988-present

Chinese name
- Traditional Chinese: 白凡
- Simplified Chinese: 白凡
Transcriptions
Standard Mandarin
- Hanyu Pinyin: Bái Fán

Bai Fan (born May 4, 1962) is a Chinese actor who has starred in various genres of film and television series. He is well known for Ren Changxia (2005), Crime Domain (2008), No 1 Landmark (2010), Beijing Love Story (2012) and Sha Mo Qing Shen Zhi Wu Yue Hua Kai etc.

== Filmography ==
=== Television series ===
Year	Title	Role
2024	Prosecutor and Boy 检察官与少年	Li Qingshu (李庆书)
2023	Hold a Court Now 我们与法庭的距离	
2023	Guo Bao Yao Shi 护宝寻踪	Zan Maochang(昝茂昌)
2022	Fireworks of my heart 我的人间烟火	Meng Huaijin(孟怀瑾)
2022	Love and Sword 只此江湖梦	Lin Qianyi (林千易)
2021	Criminal Police 我是刑警	Cao Zhongshu (曹忠恕)
2021	Be my Princess 影帝的公主	Mu Chong (穆崇)
2021	Life Is A Long Quiet River 心居	Ge Yaomin (葛耀民)
2021	Defying The Storm 凭栏一片风云起	Bai Fei (白飞）
2021	Medal of the Republic 功勋	Dr Sun (孙大夫)
2020	Brilliant Girls 爱的理想生活	Mr Dai (戴父)
2020	Face To Sea 追梦	Meng Dacheng (孟大成)
2020	Just To See You 只为那一刻与你相见	Xia Hongyuan (夏宏远)
2019	Happiness Will Knock At Your Door Again 幸福还会来敲门	Yu MuZhi (于牧之, 于主任)
2019	Imagination Season 创想季	Chen Husheng (陈沪生)
2019	No Regrets 一诺无悔	Xiong Yiguang (熊一光)
2018	Anti-Fraud League 反骗天下	Tang Jide (唐季德)
2018	Flavour It's Yours 看见味道的你	Lu Lunong (陆礼农)
2018	Your Secret 我知道你的秘密	Qiao Zhiyuan (乔致远)
2018	The Emergence of First Love 出线了，初恋	Lu Hai (陆海)
2018	Still Not Enough 还没爱够	Jiang Sinian (姜思年)
2018	Wonderful Time 一念时光	Gong Bowen (宫博文)
2017	Lucid Water Lush Mountain 绿水青山带笑颜	Xu Gua(许括)
2017	New Horizon 壮志高飞	Mr Wu (吳父)
2017	What Do I Give To You 我拿什么奉献给你	Zhao Feng (赵丰)
2017	The Returned Wild Goose 归鸿	Yin Kangnian (殷康年)
2017	The Gate of Xuan Wu 宣武门	Commissioner Wang (王署长)
2017	Youth 最亲爱的你	Tian Zhiqiang (田志强)
2016	My Dearest 最亲最爱的人	Guan Wenshan (关文山)
2016	The Fox's Summer 狐狸的夏天	Han Zhipeng (韩志鹏)
2016	Endless August 八月未央	Mr Shen (沈董事长)
2016	Graduation Season 毕业季	
2015	The Princess Weiyoung 锦绣未央	Li Xiaoran (李萧然)
2015	Modern Matchmaker 大话红娘	Ou Binghua (欧炳华)
2015	Lao Jie 老街	
2015	Huang He Zai Pao Xiao 黄河在咆哮	Zhou Fuyuan (周福源)
2015	Diamond Lover 克拉恋人	Xiao Zhendong (箫震东)
2015	Ma Lan Epic 马兰谣	Chen Kaiyuan (陈开远)
2015	Jia You Fang Ke 家有房客	Mo Weiming (莫卫铭)
2015	To Cheer For Youth 为青春点赞	Hu Zhen (胡震)
2015	Road to the North 一念向北	Tong Zhixing (童知行)
2014	Heroes Flames 烽火英雄传	Bai Shouye (白守业)
2013	Blossom in May 沙漠情深 之 五月花开	Zhen Xiangdong (郑向东)
2013	Women's General of the Army 巾帼大将军	Emperor Wen of Sui, Yang Jian (隋文帝, 杨坚)
2013	Pearl 爱闪亮	Kang Zhixuan (康志轩)
2013	Qin Qing Nuan Wo Xin 亲情暖我心	Zhang Nansheng (张南生)
2012	The Color of The Love 女人的颜色	Yu Jin (于金)
2012	Choice of Women 女人的抉择	Yu Jin (于金)
2012	Beijing Love Story 北京爱情故事	Shao Huayang (邵华阳)
2012	Imminent Crisis 一触即发	Du Luning (杜旅宁)
2011	Flowers in the Clouds 女人的天空	Ma Chun Ming (马春明)
2011	Ai Zai Ren Jian Zhi Wu Ying Den Xia 爱在人间 之 无影灯下	Gao Minghai (高明海)
2011	Ge Ming Ren Yong Yuan Nian Qing 革命人永远是年轻	Xia Zheng (夏征)
2011	Zhi Ming Zhui Zong 致命追踪	Chief Police Officer Gao (高局)
2011	Da Ai Wu Sheng 大爱无声	Gao Yuan (高远)
2010	No 1 Landmark 零号国境线	Ning Lieyu (宁烈宇)
2010	Aiyou! ZuQiu 哎呦!足球	Liu Bin (刘斌)
2009	Step Sisters 非亲姐妹	Qi Dong (齐东)
2009	Fa Ting Feng Yun 法庭风云	Cheng Guangda (程广大)
2009	Battle in Dawn 决战黎明/开国岁月	Lin Sen (林森)
2009	Ren Min Li Yi 人民利益	Wang Yibin (王一彬)
2009	Jian Die 剑谍	Feng Rutai (冯如泰)
2009	Great Northern Wilderness 情系北大荒	Division Commander (师长)
2008	When Love Has Gone 当爱已成往事	Zhao Yonglu (赵永录)
2008	Ying Ji Mo Si Ke 鹰击莫斯科	Fu Bing (傅冰)
2008	Tian Di You Ai/Shenzhen You Ai 天地有爱/深圳有爱	Kuang Fusheng (邝福生)
2008	Crime Domain 罪域	Zhen Yirang (郑毅然)
2007	Hang Ban Ji Dian Qi Fei 航班几点起飞	Liu Yuejin (刘跃进)
2007	A Gentleman's Good Mate 君子好逑	Tie Ying (铁英)
2007	The Red Spider III - Shui Zhong Hua 红蜘蛛3水中花之红粉帝国	Zhou Qiang (周强)
2006	Tian Yang Zuo Zheng/Hei Shou 太阳作证/黑手	Zhao Xuguang (赵旭光)
2006	Qian Dong Wo Xin 牵动我心	Zhou Ping (周平)
2005	Ren Changxia 任长霞	Huang Keli (黄可力)
2004	Hello Again, Real Love 残酷情感/真情再现	Situ Jie (司徒杰)
2004	Yi Kao/Sheng Si Du Ju 依靠/生死赌局	Wang Sixi (汪四喜)
2004	Women Prison 女子监狱	Wu Lijie (吴力杰)
2004	Made in China 中国造	Zhou Jun (周军)
2003	Witnesses 人证	Gao Weimin (高伟民)
2002	Psychological Murders 情有千千劫	Lin Chushi (林初石)
2002	Chu Qu Zou Zou 出去走走	Hei Zi (黑子)
2002	Luan Shi Xiong Di 乱世兄弟	Bao Laotou (豹老头)
2002	Green Flower 绿萝花	Li Guohao (李国豪)
2001	Fa Bu Rong Qing 法不容情	Chen Dongkai (陈东凯)
2001	Jing Jie Xian 警戒线	Xu Zhiqiang (许志强)
2000	Tai Yang Bu Luo Shan 太阳不落山	Peng Yadi (彭亚迪)
1999	Bing Yao 兵谣	Wen Xing (文兴)
1997	Emperor Wu of Han 汉武帝	Huo Qubing (霍去病)
1996	Shanghai Women - Bookhouse Grudge 上海女性 - 书宅恩怨	Fang QiMing (方启明)
1995	He Lan Xue/Xi Xia Wang Chao 贺兰雪/西夏王朝	Mozang Epang (没藏讹庞)
1992	Zhongguo Zhiqing Buluo 中国知青部落	Hou Guo (侯过)

=== Film ===
Year	Title	Role
2015	Frankly Speaking 打开天窗说亮话	Gu Kemin (顾克敏)
2015	A Blind Date 一路相亲	CEO Lee (李总)
2012	1935 Zha Xi 扎西1935	Luo Fu (洛甫)
2012	Mayor Liu Bocheng 刘伯承市长	Qiao Huafu (乔华甫)
2011	Red Action Team - Deadly Chase 红色行动队 - 致命追击	(Commander)师座
2008	Escape the Fire 火海逃生	Wang Bing (王兵)
2007	My Bitter Sweet Taiwan 台湾往事	Lin Hanmin (林汉敏)
1998	My Rice Noodle Shop 花桥荣记	Tuan Zhang (团长)
1988	The Charming Detective 风流女探	Wang Tao (汪涛)

== Advertisement ==
- Melatonin (脑白金)
- Sen Jia Lin Flooring (森嘉林地板)
- Yanghe Spirit Classic Series (洋河蓝色经典)
