= Jin Han (actor) =

Chinese actor and singer

- Born: 7 June 1993 (age 33); Xining, Qinghai, China
- Other name: Kim
- Education: Beijing Contemporary Music Academy
- Occupations: Actor, Singer
- Years active: 2013–present

Chinese name
- Simplified Chinese: 金瀚
Transcriptions

Jin Han (Chinese: 金瀚, born 7 June 1993) is a Chinese actor and singer.

== Career ==
In 2012, Jin made his first appearance in Tiger Hu's music video. He made his acting debut in the television series City Lover, which was filmed in 2012.

In 2014, Jin starred in the youth film The Fervent Youth, which he won an award for at the Xiangyang University Student Film Festival.

In 2015, Jin participated in the reality show Road to Star, and later came in third at the grand finals.

In 2016, Jin gained attention for his portrayal of a villain in the historical drama The Princess Weiyoung. He then gained increased recognition with the historical action drama Princess Agents, once again portraying an antagonistic character.

In 2018, Jin starred alongside Zhao Liying in the modern romance drama Our Glamorous Time. He gained positive reviews for his portrayal of a special agent turned CEO, and experienced a rise in popularity.

In 2019, Jin starred alongside Qi Wei in the legal romance drama No Secrets, adapted from the South Korean drama I Can Hear Your Voice. The same year, he starred in the historical political drama Royal Nirvana.

== Filmography ==
=== Film ===
Year	English title	Chinese title	Role	Notes
2014	The Fervent Youth	谁的青春不热血	Wang Bo	
2014	Sisters	姐妹	Jin Han	
2016	Goodbye Mermaid	再见美人鱼	Gao Hongtai	

=== Television series ===
Year	English title	Chinese title	Role	Notes
2015	Super Teacher Bing	超级教师	Ye Yuhu	
2015	Yin Chuan Da Mo Wang	伊川大魔王	Mu Ze	
2016	Campus Basketball Situation	校园篮球风云	Gao Yuan	
2016	City Lover	城市恋人		
2016	The Princess Weiyoung	锦绣未央	Chiyun Nan	
2017	Princess Agents	楚乔传	Zhao Xifeng	
2018	Our Glamorous Time	你和我的倾城时光	Li Zhicheng	
2019	No Secrets	没有秘密的你	Jiang Xia	
2019	Who's Not Rebellious Youth	谁的青春不叛逆	Wei Yi	
2019	Royal Nirvana	鹤唳华亭	Xiao Dingtang	
2020	Twisted Fate of Love	今夕何夕	Feng Xi	
2020	Hello, My Shining Love	遇见璀璨的你	Ji Mo	
2021	Thunder Chaser	雷霆令	Zhuang Yan	
2021	Jun Jiu Ling	君九龄	Zhu Zan	

=== Variety and reality show ===
Year	English title	Chinese title	Notes
2022	Call Me by Fire	披荆斩棘	Season 2

== Discography ==
Year	English title	Chinese title	Role	Notes
2016	"Fate Because of Me"	緣因我	The Princess Weiyoung OST	
2018	"Glamorous Time"	倾城时光	Our Glamorous Time OST	

== Awards and nominations ==
Year	Award	Category	Nominated work	Result	Ref.
2019	4th China Quality Television Drama Ceremony	All-Rounded Artist of the Year	—N/a	Won	
2019	China Golden Rooster and Hundred Flowers Film Festival (1st Network Drama Awards)	Best Actor	No Secrets	Won	
2019	Tencent Video All Star Awards	Breakthrough Actor	No Secrets	Won	
2019	Golden Bud - The Fourth Network Film And Television Festival	Best Actor	No Secrets, Royal Nirvana	Nominated	
