= Huabiao Award for Outstanding New Actor =

Annual Chinese film award

The Huabiao Award for Outstanding New Actor was first awarded in 1998.

== Winners & nominations ==
=== 2010s ===
Year	Number	Actor	Film
2013	15th	Awang Renqing	Phurbu & Tenzin
2013	15th	Bao Bei'er	So Young
2011	14th	Wen Zhang	Ocean Heaven
2011	14th	Xu Seng	Jingsha

=== 2000s ===
Year	Number	Actor	Film
2009	13th	Yu Shaoqun	Forever Enthralled
2009	13th	Zou Junbai	A Mei's Promise
2007	12th	Qiu Lin	Shambhala Messenger
2007	12th	Wang Junwei	The Man on the Road
2005	11th	Zhong Qiu	My Life in France
2005	11th	Jin Dong	Autumnal Rain
2004	10th	Vacancy	Vacancy
2003	9th	Pan Yueming	Terrifying Waves
2003	9th	Tong Dawei	I Love You
2003	9th	Wu Jun	Marching Towards the Sun
2002	8th	Huang Haibo	The Dream of A Young Soldier
2001	7th	Jia Yiping	Silent River
2000	6th	Huang Gexuan	The Brilliant Dance

=== 1990s ===
Year	Number	Actor	Film
1999	5th	Wang Wei	The Happy Old Home
1998	4th	Vacancy	Vacancy
