= Wang Gongliang =

Chinese singer, actor, and model

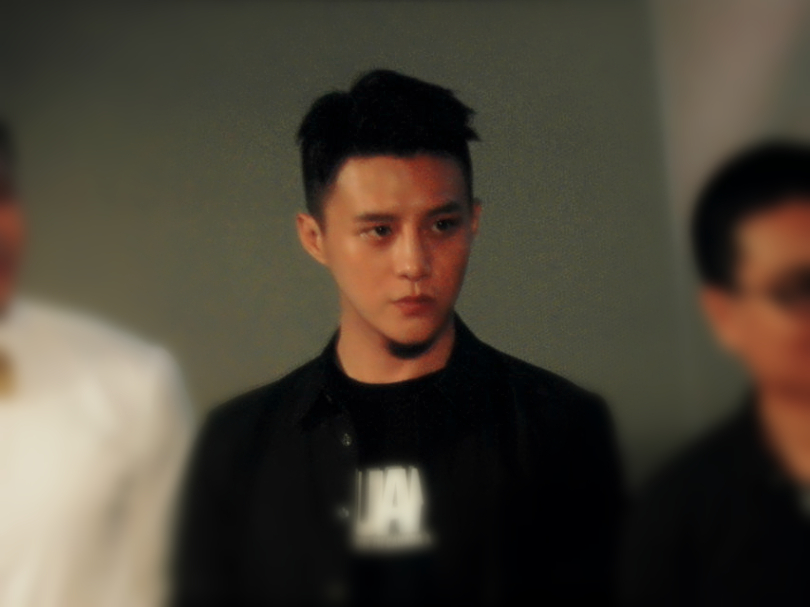
- Wang at the 2014 premiere of "Diving High" in Beijing
- Born: Wang Keda; December 14, 1989 (age 36); Shanxi, China
- Occupations: Singer, model, actor
- Years active: 2011–present
- Musical career
- Origin: China
- Genres: dance-pop
- Label: Summer Star Entertainment 2011–2016

Chinese name
- Simplified Chinese: 王柯达
Transcriptions
Standard Mandarin
- Hanyu Pinyin: Wáng Kēdá
- Wade–Giles: Wang K'o-ta
- Website: weibo.com/wangkeda

Wang Gongliang (Chinese: 王宫良; born December 14, 1989); born Wang Keda (Chinese: 王柯达), is a Chinese singer, actor and model.

== Filmography ==
=== Film ===
| Year | Title | Role | Director |
|---|---|---|---|
| 2014 | Wave To and Fro | A-sang Wei | |
| 2013 | Diving High | Peng Gu | Xichuan Zang |
| 2011 | The Flowers of War | Kuomintang soldier | Zhang Yimou |
| 2012 | Elopement | NONO | Yi Han |
| 2012 | On My Way | Ting Lei | Yonglin Mai；Yuan Li |

=== Television ===
| Year | Title | Role | Director |
|---|---|---|---|
| 2018 | My Story for You | Li Ningfeng | |
| 2015 | Balala the Fairies | Omar Prince | |
| 2014 | Sunshine in Me | Tianxiang Yang | |
| 2014 | The Goddess Office | Zhen Shuai | |
| 2013 | Time To Love | Jie Lin | Ning Wang |
| 2012 | Chairman Mao | Xuezan Luo | Xixi Gao |
| 2011 | Great Wall， My Love | Guobin Yang | |
| 2011 | Pursue and Capture | Dragon Lin | Shaoqing Xiang |
