= 9th Beijing College Student Film Festival =

2002 film festival in Beijing, China

The 9th Beijing College Student Film Festival (simplified Chinese: 第九届北京大学生电影节; traditional Chinese: 第九屆北京大學生電影節) was held from 22 April to 26 May 2002 in Beijing, China.

== Awards ==
- Best Film Award: The Dream of a Young Soldier
- Best Director Award: Huang Jianxin for Who Cares
- Best Actor Award: Fu Biao for Escort
- Best Actress Award: Hu Ke for Chat
- Best Visual Effects Award: Charging Out Amazon, Big Shot's Funeral
- Best Newcomer Award: Huang Haibo for he Dream of a Young Soldier
- Best First Film Award: Lu Chuan for The Missing Gun
- Favorite Film Award: Spring Subway
- Favorite Actor: Ge You for Big Shot's Funeral
- Favorite Actress Award: Xu Jinglei for Spring Subway
- Artistic Exploration Award: Zhang Yang for Quitting
- Grand Prix Award: A Young Prisoner's Revenge, Chat
- Committee Special Award: Purple Sunset, Bright Star
- Special Award for Comedy: Huang Hong for 25 Kids and a Dad
- Outstanding Contribution to Chinese Cinema Award: Xie Jin
