= A Beautiful Daughter-in-law Era =

Chinese drama TV series

- Traditional Chinese: 媳婦的美好時代
- Simplified Chinese: 媳妇的美好时代
- Hanyu Pinyin: Xífù dě Měihǎo Shídài
- Genre: Romantic comedy
- Based on: A Beautiful Daughter-in-law Era by Wang Liping
- Written by: Wang Liping
- Directed by: Liu Jiang
- Starring: Hai Qing; Huang Haibo
- Country of origin: China
- Original language: Mandarin
- No. of seasons: 1
- No. of episodes: 36

Production
- Executive producer: Sun Ying

Original release
- Network: Beijing Television; Dragon Television
- Release: 29 March 2010 – April 2010

A Beautiful Daughter-in-law Era (Chinese: 媳妇的美好时代) is a 2009 Chinese romantic drama television series directed by Liu Jiang which broadcast on Beijing Television and Dragon Television and from March 2010 to April 2010. It stars Hai Qing and Huang Haibo. The series was produced by Beijing HualuBaina Film & TV Company Limited, Shanghai Media Group in association with Beijing Media Network. It is based on the novel of the same name by Wang Liping. The series follows the story of an ordinary family life in urban areas of China.

== Cast and characters ==
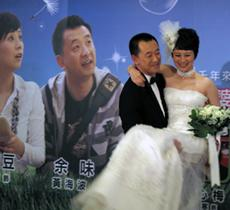
Huang Haibo and Hai Qing at A Beautiful Daughter-in-law Era propaganda press conference in Taiwan in June 2010.

Main

- Hai Qing as Mao Doudou
- Huang Haibo as Yu Wei

Supporting

- Lin Shen as Mao Feng, Mao Doudou's younger brother.
- Bai Han as Cao Xinmei, mother of Yu Wei and Yu Hao.
- Liu Lili as Wang Shenghong, mother of Mao Doudou and Mao Feng.
- Li Guangfu as Mao Jianhua, father of Mao Doudou and Mao Feng.
- Yue Yue as Yu Hao, Yu Wei's younger sister.
- Zhang Jianing as Pan Meili, Pan Fenghuang's younger sister.
- Ji Qilin as Yu Hongshui, father of Yu Wei and Yu Hao.
- Gao Baobao as Yao Jing, Yu Hongshui's second wife.
- Shi Yanjing as Yang Shu, Cao Xinmei's second husband.
- Feng Jiayi as Li Ruoqiu
- Liang Jingke as Qin Susu, Mao Feng's ex-wife.
- Li Kunlin as Yang Yifan, Yang Shu's son with his former wife.

== Soundtrack ==
No.	Title	Lyrics	Music	Singer(s)	Length
1.	"The Track of Love (爱的轨迹)" (Opening theme)	Enk Bayar	Enk Bayar	Black Duck

== Broadcasts ==
A Beautiful Daughter-in-law Era was first dubbed in Swahili and broadcast across East African countries in 2011. The Arabic-dubbed version of A Beautiful Daughter-in-law Era was broadcast in Iraq in September 2019.

== Awards and nominations ==
Year	Award	Category	Nominated work/ people	Result	Notes
2010	Shanghai Television Festival	Best Writer	Wang Liping	Won	
2010	Shanghai Television Festival	Silver Award for Best Television Series	A Beautiful Daughter-in-law Era	Won	
2010	Shanghai Television Festival	Best Actress in a Television Series	Bai Han	Won	
2010	25th Golden Eagle Awards	Outstanding Television Series	A Beautiful Daughter-in-law Era	Won	
2010	25th Golden Eagle Awards	Best Actor	Huang Haibo	Nominated	
2010	Tokyo International Television Festival	Best Foreign Television Series	A Beautiful Daughter-in-law Era	Won	
2010	China TV Drama Awards	Best Actress	Hai Qing	Won	
2010	China TV Drama Awards	Best Supporting Actress	Bai Han	Won	
2011	28th Flying Apsaras Awards	Full-length Television Series First Prize	A Beautiful Daughter-in-law Era	Won	
2011	28th Flying Apsaras Awards	Outstanding Writer	Wang Liping	Won	
2011	28th Flying Apsaras Awards	Outstanding Actress	Hai Qing	Won	
2011	28th Flying Apsaras Awards	Outstanding Director Award	Liu Jiang	Nominated	
2011	Asia Rainbow TV Awards	Modern Drama	A Beautiful Daughter-in-law Era	Won	
2018	Shanghai Television Festival	International Communication Award	A Beautiful Daughter-in-law Era	Won	
