= Let's Get Married (2015 film) =

- Film poster
- 咱们结婚吧
- Directed by: Liu Jiang
- Written by: Liu Jiang; Wang Hongwei; Wang Yu; Xu Nan
- Based on: Chinese TV series of the same name
- Produced by: Chen Rong; Liu Jiang; Zhang Yi Song; Jiang Wei; Li Ning
- Starring: Gao Yuanyuan; Jiang Wu; Li Chen; Zheng Kai; Ivy Chen
- Cinematography: Florian Zinke
- Music by: Nathan Wang
- Production companies: Perfect World Pictures; Heyi Pictures
- Distributed by: Perfect World Pictures
- Release date: April 2, 2015 (China)
- Running time: 127 minutes
- Country: China
- Language: Mandarin
- Box office: US$45.42 million (China)

Let's Get Married (Chinese: 咱们结婚吧) is a 2015 Chinese romantic comedy film directed by Liu Jiang. It was released on April 2, 2015.

== Cast ==
- Gao Yuanyuan as Ye Wen Wen
- Jiang Wu as Chen Zhen Xuan
- Li Chen as Luca
- Zheng Kai as Xiao Ling
- Ivy Chen as Gu Xiao Lei
- Bea Hayden as Wen Yi
- Liu Tao as Haixin
- Wang Zijian as Dapeng
- Ming Dao
- Sa Rina
- Zhang Duo
- Ryan Zuo
- Monica Mok
- Tu Honggang
- Ying Zhuang
- Jerry
- Fan Ming
- Jiang Ping
- Wang Tong
- Liu Tianchi

== Production ==
The film was shot in China (Beijing, Shenzhen) and Italy (Rome, Matera).

== Box office ==
As of April 19, 2015, it has earned US$45.42 million at the Chinese box office.
