= Ningxiang No. 1 High School =

- 宁乡一中
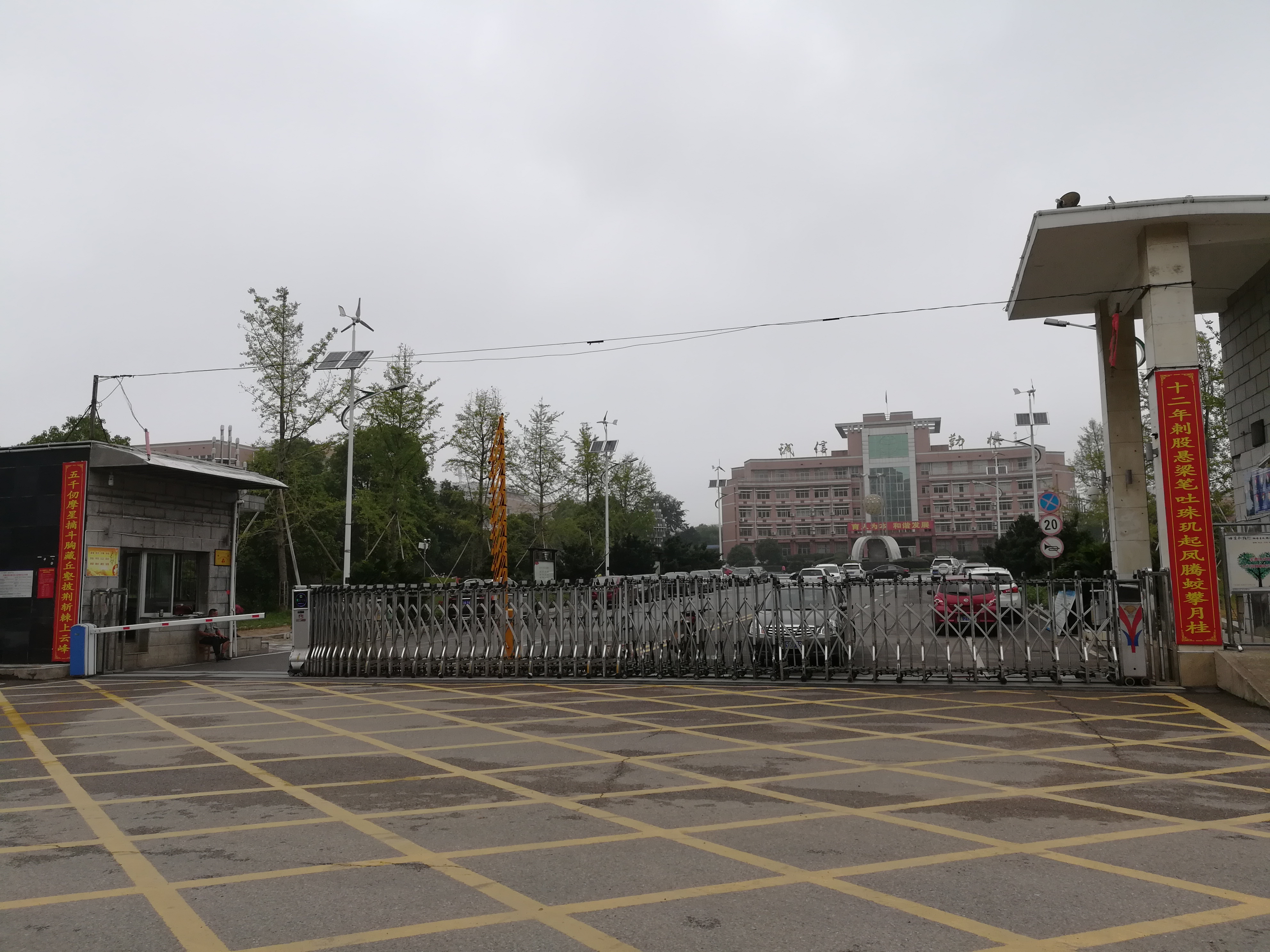
- Entrance of Ningxiang No.1 High School.

Location
- Yutan Subdistrict, Ningxiang, Hunan, China; 410600; 28°16′53″N 112°33′56″E

Information
- Former name: Old-style Private School of Zhou Family; Zhounan Girls' School; Zhounan Female Normal School; Private Zhounan School for Girls; Hunan Provincial No.1 Female Normal School; Hunan Provincial No. 5 High School
- Type: Comprehensive Public High School
- Motto: 诚、信、勤、朴 (Honesty, faith, diligence, simplicity)
- Established: 1905
- Founders: Zhu Jianfan (朱剑凡)
- Principal: Ouyang Cai (欧阳才)
- Grades: 10 to 12
- Gender: Coed
- Campus size: 266,666.67 square metres (2,870,376.1 sq ft)
- Campus type: Urban
- Affiliation: Ningxiang Municipal Bureau of Education

Ningxiang No. 1 High School (simplified Chinese: 宁乡市第一中高级中学; traditional Chinese: 寧鄉市第一高級中學; pinyin: Níngxiāng Yīzhōng), commonly abbreviated as (Ningxiang) Yizhong (simplified Chinese: 宁乡一中; traditional Chinese: 寧鄉一中), is a public coeducational high school in Yutan Subdistrict of Ningxiang, Hunan, China.

== History ==
Ningxiang No. 1 High School traces its history back to the former Old-style Private School of Zhou Family (周氏家塾), founded by educator Zhu Jianfan (朱剑凡) in 1905, and it was renamed Zhounan Girls' School (周南女学堂) in 1907 and then Zhounan Female Normal School (周南女子师范学堂) in the following year.

In 1912, Hunan Provincial No.1 Female Normal School (湖南省省立第一女子师范学校) was founded by Zhu Jianfan. Part of the school was separated, and girls' school was established, initially called Private Zhounan School for Girls (私立周南女子学校).

After the outbreak of the Second Sino-Japanese War in 1937 (and the resulting expansion of Japanese territorial control in east China), the school moved to Xiangtan, Loudi, Anhua successively.

In 1941, Hunan Provincial No.1 Female Normal School changed its name to Hunan Provincial No. 5 High School (湖南省省立第五中学).

After the establishment of the Communist State in 1952, the school moved back to Ningxiang and it was officially named Ningxiang No. 1 High School.

It was listed among the first group of "Hunan Provincial Key High Schools" (湖南省首批省级重点中学) by the Hunan Province Office of Education in 1959 and "Hunan Demonstrative High Schools" (湖南省首批示范性高级中学) in 1994.

In 2002, the school moved to the present address.

In 2015, the school was categorized as a "Top 100 High Schools of China" (中国百强中学).

== Faculty ==
Ningxiang No. 1 High School has a reasonable teacher's structure and abundant qualified teachers. There are 338 teachers teaching in the school, one of them is senior teacher, three are special-grade teachers and five national backbone teachers.

== Achievement ==
With a high reputation for outstanding school running achievements, Ningxiang No.1 High School is recognized by the whole society and generate extensive social effect. In the past few years, the school has been awarded more than 10 provincial or above honorary titles, such as "National educational research and experimental school", "National key scientific research experimental school in 11th Five-Year", etc. In 2005 and 2007, the school was appraised twice as the "China top 100 middle school". In 2003, the famous scientists, the academician of the Chinese Academy of Sciences, the former vice chairman of the Standing Committee of the National People's Congress, and the former chairman of the Chinese Association of science and technology, Zhou Guangzhao, donated the gold medal of "two bombs and one star" to Ningxiang No.1 High School, encouraging the vast majority of the students to study hard and make contributions to science.

== Athletics ==
- Weightlifting. In 2011 the school's Weightlifting Team won a gold medal and two silver medals in the Youth Weightlifting Competition in Peru. In October 2017, the school's Weightlifting Team won 11 gold medals, 11 silver medals and 3 bronze medals in the National Weightlifting Championship for High School Students (全国中学生举重锦标赛).
- Track and field. In 2011 the school's Track and field Team won a silver medal and two bronze medals in the High School Track and Field Championships in Poland.

== Notable alumni ==
- Liu Wei, businessman and founder of miHoYo.
- Xiang Jingyu, revolutionist.
- Zeng Xianzhi, politician.

== Gallery ==
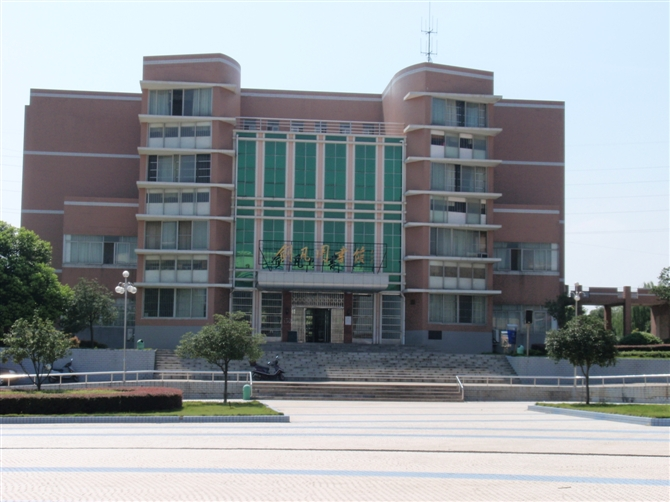
Jianfan Library (剑凡图书馆).

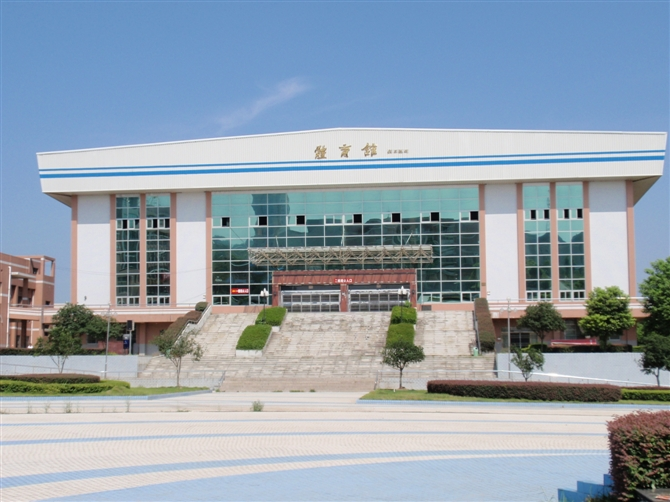
Gymnasium.

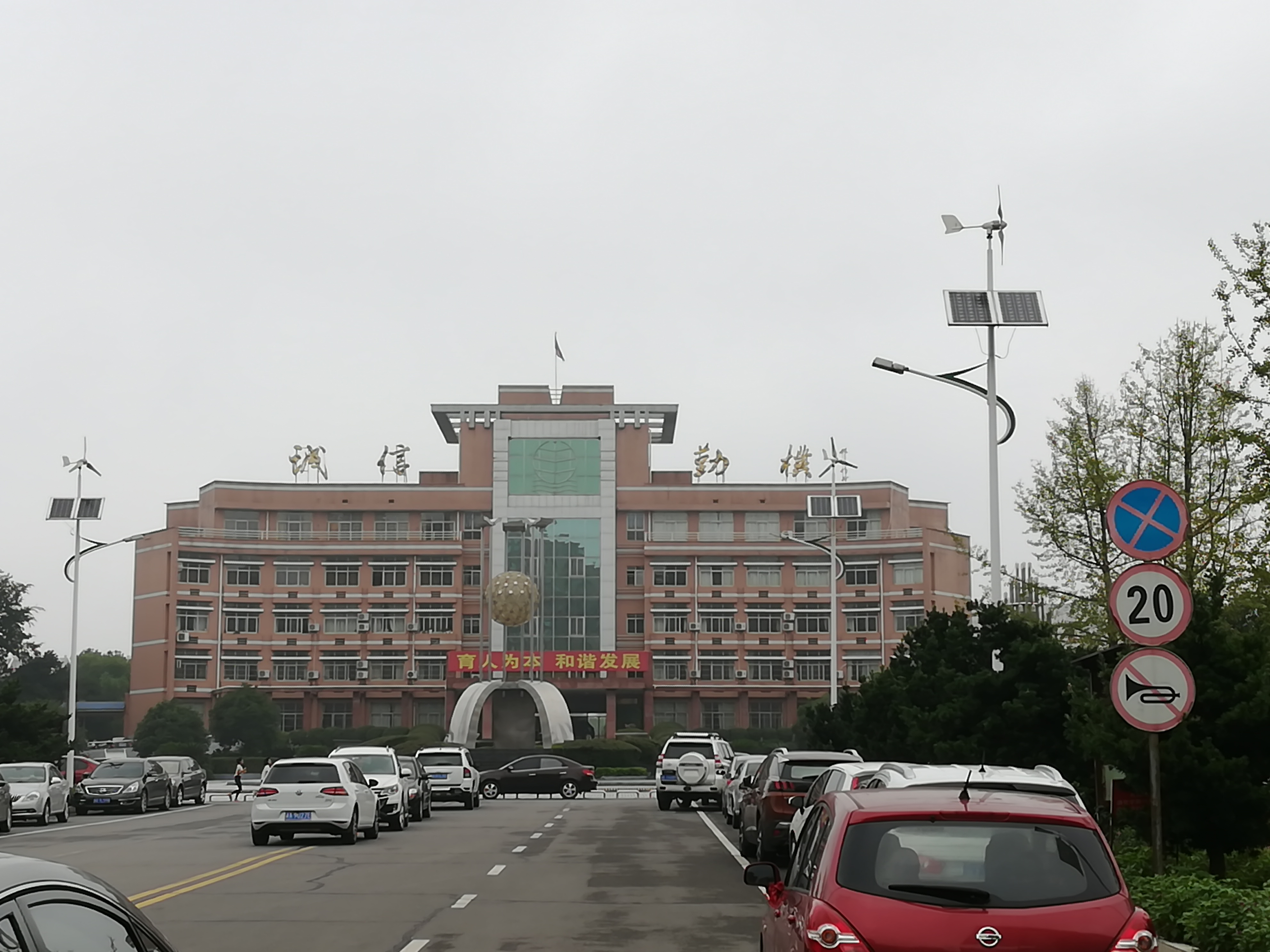
Administration Building (行政大楼).
