= Luo Jin =

Chinese actor and singer (born 1981)

- 罗晋
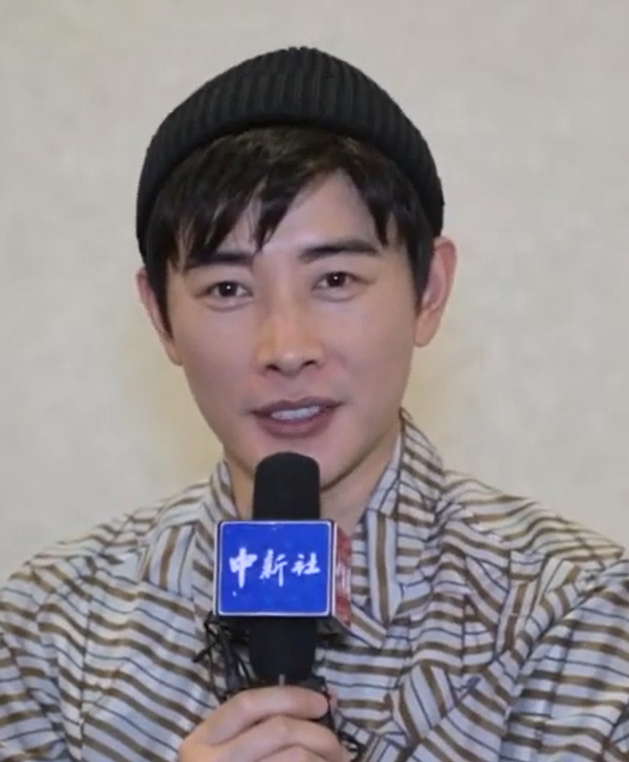
- Luo in 2019
- Born: November 30, 1981 (age 44); Yichun, Jiangxi, China
- Education: Beijing Film Academy
- Occupations: Actor, Singer
- Years active: 2003–present
- Agent: Luo Jin Studio
- Height: 1.81 m (5 ft 11 in)
- Spouse: Tiffany Tang (m. 2018)
- Children: 1

Chinese name
- Traditional Chinese: 羅晉
- Simplified Chinese: 罗晋
Transcriptions
Standard Mandarin
- Hanyu Pinyin: Luó Jìn
Yue: Cantonese
- Jyutping: Luo2 Jin4
- Website: web.archive.org/web/20110412054258/http://www.tangde.com.cn/artist2.asp?proid=33

Luo Jin (simplified Chinese: 罗晋; traditional Chinese: 羅晉; pinyin: Luó Jìn, born November 30, 1981) is a Chinese actor and singer. He graduated from Beijing Film Academy in 2006.

== Early life and career ==
Luo was born on November 30, 1981, in Tonggu County, Yichun, Jiangxi. He made his acting debut in the 2003 drama The Showroom Tales. In 2007, Luo starred in the film Fujian Blue (2007) which won the Dragons and Tigers Award and the 2007 Vancouver International Film Festival.

2010 was considered Luo's breakout year. He first gained attention for his portrayal of Emperor Xian of Han in the acclaimed historical drama Three Kingdoms (2010), directed by Gao Xixi. Thereafter, his popularity increased after starring in palace drama Beauty's Rival in Palace (2010), where he played a Han-dynasty Emperor who sacrificed himself for love. The same year, he starred in the Mexican-Spanish film Biutiful alongside Javier Bardem. The film was invited to the Cannes Film Festival.

This was followed up with starring roles in dramas such as war drama Far Away the Eagle (2011), historical dramas Mui Guiying Takes Command (2012), and Beauties of the Emperor (2012), and spy drama Agent X (2013); which showcased his acting versatility and helped raise his recognition in China. In 2014, he won the Most Popular Actor award at the China Student Television Festival for his performance in the war drama Ten Rides of Red Army.

Luo successfully broke into the mainstream with his performance in the television series Diamond Lover (2015) and The Princess Weiyoung (2016), both co-starring Tiffany Tang. Luo also has supporting roles in the biopic film Xuan Zang (2016) and fantasy romance film Once Upon a Time (2017); which led to him winning the Most Anticipated Actor at the Weibo Movie Awards Ceremony.

Following a two-year hiatus, Luo made his small screen comeback in 2017 with crime drama Love's Lies, followed by romance dramas The Way We Were and My Story for You.

In 2019, Luo starred in the workplace drama Behind The Scenes as a television producer; and played the role of Yang Jian in fantasy drama The Gods. The same year, Luo starred in the historical political drama Royal Nirvana. Luo ranked 48th on Forbes China Celebrity 100 list.

In 2020, Luo starred in the workplace slice-of-life drama I Will Find You a Better Home as a genius analyst who became a manager of a real estate office. He ranked 50th on Forbes China Celebrity 100 list.

== Personal life ==
On 6 December 2016, Luo confirmed his relationship with actress Tiffany Tang. In October 2018, Luo and Tang were married in Vienna, Austria. In September 2019, they announced that they were expecting their first child together. In December 2019 she had given birth to a baby girl.

== Filmography ==
=== Film ===
Year	English title	Chinese title	Role	Ref.
2007	Fujian Blue	金碧辉煌	A Long	
2010	Biutiful	美错	Li Wei	
2010	River on Air	不可复制的恋人	Lu Yang	
2010	Good Morning My Love	早安我的爱	Wang Hai	
2016	Xuan Zang	大唐玄奘	Li Chang	
2017	Once Upon a Time	三生三世十里桃花	Zhe Yan	
2017	Ash	追·踪	Wang Dong	
2021	Endless Summer	八月未央	Zhao Yan	

=== Television series ===
Year	English title	Chinese title	Role	Notes/Ref.
2003	The Showroom Tales	售楼处的故事	A Xing	
2008	The Eyes of War	战争目光	Yuan Gao	
2008	Dream Heaven	梦幻天堂	Chen Zibu	
2008	Forever Justice	正义永恒	Yu Min	
2008	Beautiful Southern	美丽的南方	Chen Qiming	
2010	Beauty's Rival in Palace	美人心计	Emperor Hui / Lord Douchang	
2010	Three Kingdoms	三国	Emperor Xian	
2011	Marriage Code	婚姻密码	Wang Yi	
2011	A Cheng	阿诚	A Cheng	
2011	Far Away the Eagle	远去的飞鹰	Wu Haiwen	
2011	Beauty World	唐宫美人天下	Ji Dapeng	
2011	Hidden Intention	被遗弃的秘密	Zhou Tianqi	
2012	Mu Guiying Takes Command	穆桂英挂帅	Yang Zongbao	
2012	Little Cabbage Unique Case	小白菜奇案	Lin Gongshu	
2012	Beauties of the Emperor	王的女人	Hai Tian	
2012	A Beauty in Troubled Times	乱世佳人	Chong Yang	
2013	Agent X	X女特工	He Junfeng	
2013	Weaning	断奶	Wu Zhonglin	
2013	Love's Discussion	爱的相对论	Yuan Ye	
2014	Lend me Your Hands	错放你的手	Yuan Kun	
2014	Me and My Amazing Grandma	我和我的传奇奶奶	Gou Wa	
2014	Good Wife 101	幸福36计	Tong Xiaoqi	
2014	10 Rides of Red Army	十送红军	Gao Fuxing	
2014	Cosmetology High	美人制造	Di Jiang	
2015	My Three Fathers	爸爸父亲爹	Ning Wuyuan	
2015	Diamond Lover	克拉恋人	Lei Yiming	
2015	Robber	枪侠	Tang Yumian	
2015	Narrow Road	狭路	Ma Long	
2016	Six Doors	六扇门	Sun Xin	Special appearance
2016	The Princess Weiyoung	锦绣未央	Tuoba Jun	
2018	Love's Lies	真爱的谎言之破冰者	Jin Yuan	
2018	The Way We Were	归去来	Shu Che	
2018	My Story for You	为了你，我愿意热爱整个世界	Zhang Changgong	
2019	Behind The Scenes	幕后之王	Chun Yuqiao	
2019	The Gods	封神	Yang Jian	
2019	Royal Nirvana	鹤唳华亭	Xiao Dingquan	
2020	I Will Find You a Better Home	安家	Xu Wenchang	
2021	A Land So Rich in Beauty	江山如此多娇	Pu Quansheng	
2021	Ebola Fighters	埃博拉前线	Zheng Shupeng	
2022	The Story of Xing Fu	幸福到萬家	Guan Tao	
2022	Out of Court	庭外	Qiao Shaoting	
2022	Tianxia Changhe	天下长河	Kangxi Emperor	
2024	Scout Hero	侦察英雄	Liang Chen	
2024	Enforcement Department	执行法官	Qi Tao	
2025	Breaking the Shadows	乌云之上	Zhong Wei	
2025	The Legend of He Xian Gu	修仙记之何仙姑传	Hun Dun	
2025	Beloved	目之所及	Su Muxin	
2025	Back to the Origin	时差一万公里	Fu Yudong	
TBA	Silent Echoes	无声的回响	Ma Xuesong	
TBA	Kuang Ye Zhi Jing	旷野之境	Xiao Kuang	

== Discography ==
=== Singles ===
Year	English title	Chinese title	Album	Notes
2011	"This Season"	这个冬季	—N/a	
2012	"Using a Lifetime to Reminisce"	用一生回憶	A Beauty in Troubled Times OST	with Tiffany Tang
2012	"Love Won't Regret"	爱不后悔	A Beauty in Troubled Times OST	
2013	"Separation"	离合	Agent X OST	
2014	"Another Half"	另一半	Good Wife 101 OST	
2015	"If I Promise You"	如果我答应你	Diamond Lover OST	
2016 2018	"Heavenly Gift" Confession	天賦	The Princess Weiyoung OST Love's Lies OST	with Tiffany Tang

== Awards and nominations ==
Year	Award	Category	Nominated work	Result	Ref.
2011	2nd China TV Drama Awards	Acting Idol Award	—N/a	Won	
2013	5th China TV Drama Awards	Most Popular Actor (Mainland China)	Agent X	Won	
2014	5th China Student Television Festival	Most Popular Actor	Ten Rides of Red Army	Won	
2016	8th Macau International Movie Festival	Best Supporting Actor	Xuan Zang	Nominated	
2016	8th China TV Drama Awards	Most Popular Actor	The Princess Weiyoung	Won	
2017	2nd China Quality Television Drama Ceremony	Media's Most Noticed Actor	The Princess Weiyoung	Won	
2017	22nd Huading Awards	Best Actor (Ancient Drama)	The Princess Weiyoung	Nominated	
2017	2nd Weibo Movie Awards Ceremony	Most Anticipated Actor	—N/a	Won	
2018	24th Huading Awards	Best Actor (Modern Drama)	The Way We Were	Nominated	
2019	4th China Quality Television Drama Ceremony	Influence Star of the Year	—N/a	Won	
2019	Golden Bud - The Third Network Film And Television Festival	Quality Actor	—N/a	Won	
2019	6th The Actors of China Award Ceremony	Best Actor (Sapphire Category)	Behind The Scenes	Nominated	
2019	Golden Bud - The Fourth Network Film And Television Festival	Best Actor	Behind The Scenes, Royal Nirvana	Nominated	
2020	7th The Actors of China Award Ceremony	Best Actor (Sapphire)	—N/a	Nominated	
