= Su Mang =

Chinese businesswoman and former editor-in-chief of Harper's Bazaar China

- Born: October 15, 1971 (age 53); Jinan, Shandong Province, China

Su Mang (Chinese: 苏芒; pinyin: sū máng) (born October 15, 1971) is a Chinese businesswoman and former editor-in-chief of Harper’s Bazaar China. As the CEO of the Trends Media Group publishing house, she manages the Chinese editions of Cosmopolitan, Esquire and Good Housekeeping. She is regarded by many critics as one of the most influential figures in Chinese fashion and is often dubbed the Chinese Devil Wears Prada.

== Biography ==
Su was born in 1971 in Jinan, Shandong Province. From an early age she had learned how to play the Guzheng and after winning a national music competition she trained for a number of years before entering the China Conservatory of Music. Graduating in 1991, Su decided not to continue her musical career and instead sought work as a writer at the newly created Trends Magazine which became China's first fashion magazine.

By the mid-90s as Western fashion labels started entering the Chinese market, Su was made head of advertising at the now Trends Media Group and by 2001 became its CEO. Around the same time the company partnered with the American Bazaar magazine making Su the editor-in-chief of its Chinese edition. As of 2017 Su controls over 18 fashion and lifestyle magazines and has been listed on the BoF 500 every year since 2014.
