= Huang Haibo (actor) =

Chinese actor (born 1976)

- 黄海波
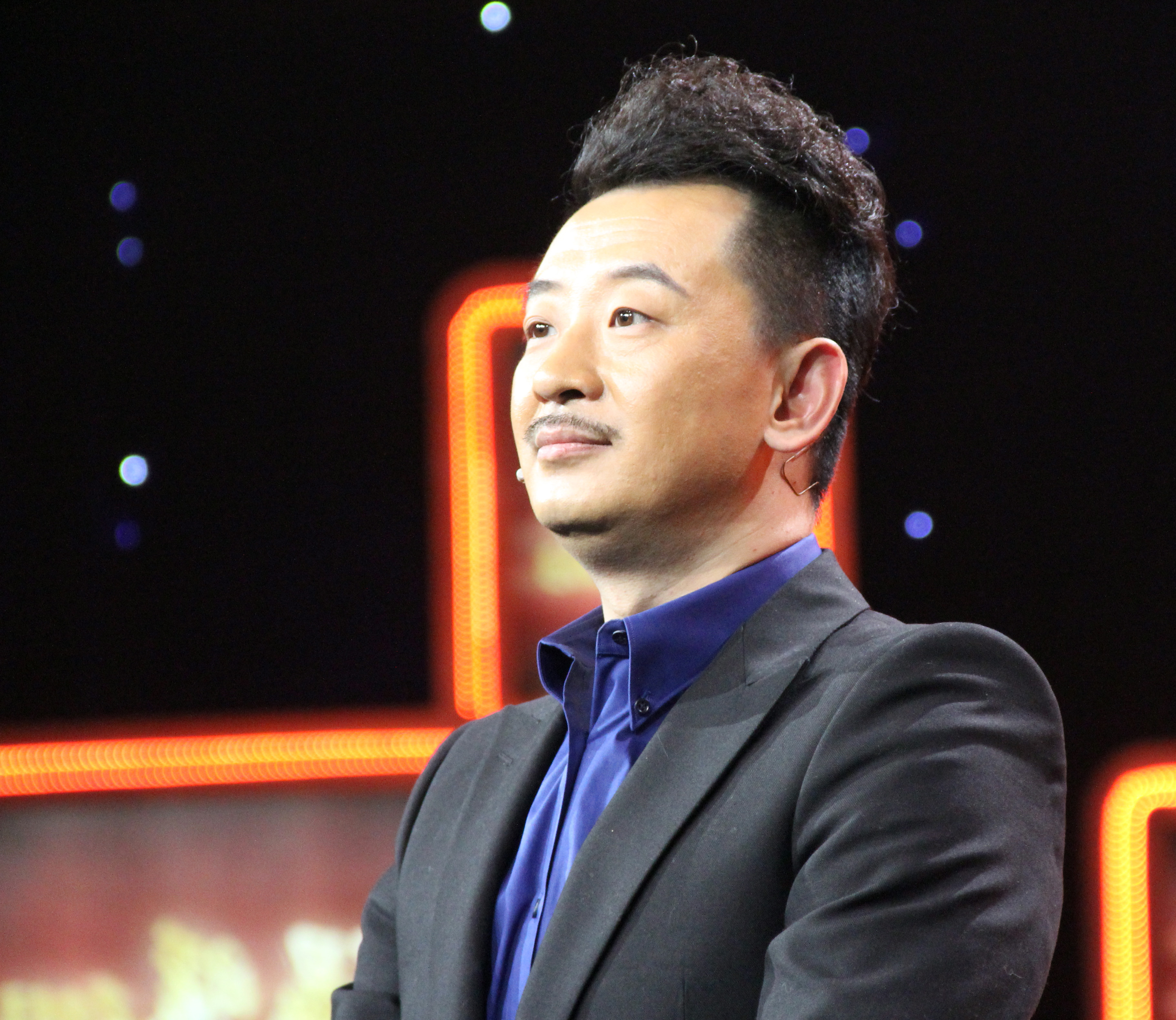
- Huang Haibo, during the filming of Chinese talk show Art Life, 11 December 2013.
- Born: November 25, 1976 (age 49); Jizhou District, Tianjin, China
- Education: Beijing Film Academy
- Occupation: Actor
- Years active: 2001-present
- Height: 1.7 m (5 ft 7 in)
- Spouse: Qu Shanshan (m. 2014)
- Children: 1
- Musical career
- Genres: Mandapop

Chinese name
- Traditional Chinese: 黃海波
- Simplified Chinese: 黄海波
Transcriptions
Standard Mandarin
- Hanyu Pinyin: Huáng Hǎibō

Huang Haibo (Chinese: 黄海波; born 25 November 1976) is a Chinese actor of Manchu descent, known for his roles in film The Dream of A Young Soldier (2001), and in television series Chasing, A Beautiful Daughter-in-law Era, Forever Designation and Let's Get Married!. He was blacklisted in China for a prostitution scandal in 2014.

== Early life and education ==
Huang was born into a military family in Jizhou District of Tianjin, on November 25, 1975. In 1997 he was accepted to Beijing Film Academy, where he majored in acting.

== Acting career ==
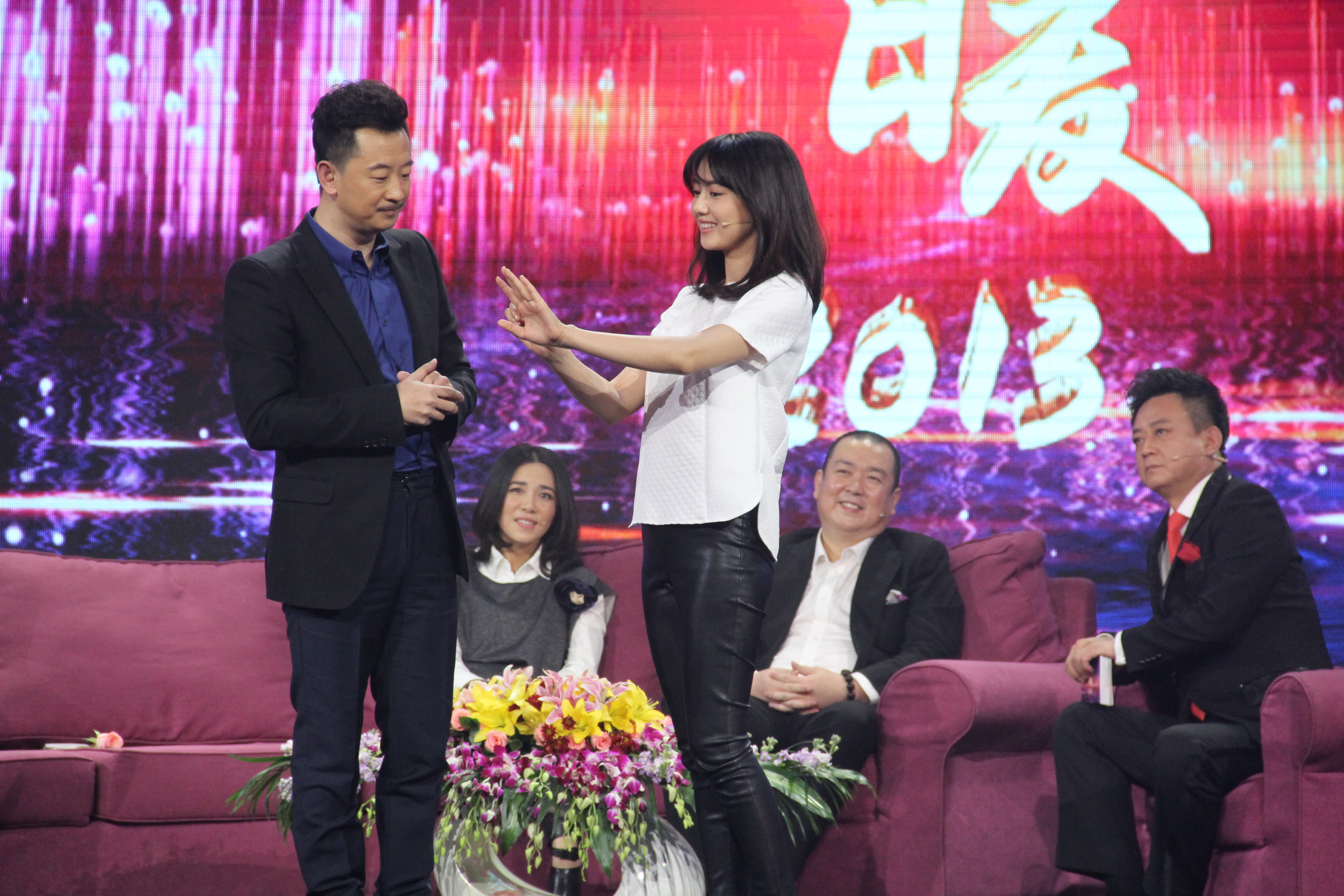
Huang Haibo and Gao Yuanyuan, during the filming of Chinese talk show Art Life, on 11 December 2013. In this episode, cast and director of popular TV drama We Let Married! were invited.

Huang's first film role was uncredited appearance in the film Young Prisoners of War (1989). In the following year, he appeared in The Meridian of War, directed by Feng Xiaoning.

In 1992, Huang made his television debut in the historical television series Beiyang Fleet, portraying young Lin Taizeng. The series starring Chen Baoguo, Chen Daoming, Ge You and directed by Feng Xiaoning.

During his junior year, he got a small role in The Years of Intense Emotion (2001), a romance television drama starring Sun Haiying and Lü Liping.

Huang's breakthrough role came when he played Yu Xiaobei in the 2001 film The Dream of A Young Soldier, which garnered him a Best Newcomer Award at the 9th Beijing College Student Film Festival, an Outstanding New Actor Award at the 8th Huabiao Awards and a Golden Phoenix Award.

In 2003, he had a cameo appearance in Let Us Remember, a film starring He Bing, Guo Donglin, Xu Fan, Huang Hong, Cai Ming, Li Mingqi, and Li Xiaolu. That same year, he also participated in Stormy Sea, opposite Wu Gang, Ning Jing, Li Youbin, and Zhao Youliang.

Huang portrayed Deng Shaosheng, Deng Xiaoping's uncle, in My Early Days in France (2004). At the same year, he played the character Zhu Bajie in the shenmo television series Good Luck Zhu Bajie.

In 2005, he played a key supporting role in the historical television series Crying without Tears, starring Vincent Chiao and Park Si-yeon.

From 2006 to 2008, he appeared in dozens of television series, such as Life Hand In Hand (2006), The Love Story in Tangshan (2006), Shanghai Bund (2007), Chasing (2007), Stone Scissors Cloth (2008), and Life Is Beautiful (2008). For his role as Jiang Dongzhi in Chasing, he won the Magnolia Award for Best Actor in a Television Series at the 14th Shanghai Television Festival. He starred with Tony Leung Ka-fai, Emme Wong and Li Tete in the 2008 drama A Chinese Fairy Tale.

Huang co-starred with Du Zhiguo, Ye Jing, He Saifei and Bobo Gan in the 2009 action television series Jianghu Brothers.

Huang became widely known to audiences with A Beautiful Daughter-in-law Era (2010), in which he played the romantic interest of Mao Doudou, Hai Qing's character. He was nominated for Best Actor Award at the 25th Golden Eagle Awards. That same year, he was cast in Welcome to Shama Town, opposite Sun Honglei, Lin Chi-ling, Li Liqun and Vivian Gan.

In 2011, Huang earned his second Best Actor Award at the 18th Shanghai Television Festival for his performance in Forever Designation. He played a supporting role in The Flowers of War, starring Christian Bale, Ni Ni, Zhang Xinyi, Tong Dawei, Atsuro Watabe and Shigeo Kobayashi and directed by Zhang Yimou.

Huang rose to fame after portraying the romantic interest of Gao Yuanyuan's character in the television series Let's get married! (2013), the series was one of the most watched ones in CCTV while it was aired in mainland China in that year.

In 2014, Huang's performance in Uncle Victory which garnered him a Best Actor Award at the Golden Koala Chinese Film Festival in Australia. He starred as Jiang Hai, reuniting him with co-star Zhang Jingchu, who played his love interest, in television series A Selfless Love.

== Personal life ==
In 2014 Huang married actress Qu Shanshan in Los Angeles, California, United States. Their son was born on August 6, 2015, in Beijing.

== Controversy ==
On May 16, 2014, Beijing Municipal Public Security Bureau announced that Huang was arrested for hiring a prostitute. Both Huang and the alleged transgender prostitute, Liu Xinyu, were sentenced to 6 months. In 2018, Liu stated during a livestream that she was not a sex worker but a minor actress. She claimed that Huang had been repeatedly pressured to drink, became unwell, and was taken to a hotel, and that no sexual transaction had occurred before police intervened and arrested them on prostitution-related charges. Liu suggested that the incident had been a setup intended to frame Huang. Huang has not publicly responded to these claims.

== Filmography ==
=== Film ===
Year	English title	Chinese title	Role	Notes
1989	Young Prisoners of War	少年战俘	Ba Jin	
1990	The Meridian of War	战争子午线	Shan Pao	
1990	Mother	妈妈	Dongdong	
2001	The Dream of A Young Soldier	高原如梦	Yu Xiaobei	
2003	Let Us Remember	让我们记住	Song Kai	
2003	Stormy Sea	惊涛骇浪	Wei Laobing	
2004	My Early Days in France	我们的法兰西岁月	Deng Shaosheng	
2008	A Chinese Fairy Tale	欣月童话	Zhu dechun	
2010	Welcome to Shama Town	决战刹马镇	Mao Zong	
2011	The Flowers of War	金陵十三钗	Xu Dapeng	
2013	Uncle Victory	胜利	Chen Shengli (Uncle Victory)	
2013	—N/a	事出有姻		

=== Television ===
Year	English title	Chinese title	Role	Notes
1992	Beiyang Fleet	北洋水师	Young Lin Taizeng	
1998	Story of the Department of Acting	表演系的故事	Wang Xinmin	
2001	The Years of Intense Emotion	激情燃烧的岁月	Shi Lin	
2002	—N/a	武圣关羽出解梁	Lü Long	
2003	Taiwan Straits	台湾海峡	Lin Ziqi	
2003	Goodbye, Zhadele	再见扎德勒	Gao Yuan	
2004	Good Luck Zhu Bajie	福星高照猪八戒	Zhu Bajie	
2004	—N/a	谍战之特殊较量	Qiu Feng	
2005	—N/a	合同爸爸	Lao Zhonghua	
2005	Crying without Tears	哭也不流泪	Tan Xiaoliang	
2005	A Pair in Love	凤求凰	Sang Pu	
2006	Life Hand In Hand	牵手人生	Ma Wenjun	
2006	The Breaking of Rock Frightens the Heaven	石破天惊	Wei Guangliang	
2006	The Love Story in Tangshan	唐山绝恋	Zhou Haiguang	
2007	Shanghai Bund	新上海滩	Ding Li	
2007	Chasing	追	Jiang Dongzhi	
2007	I Will Wait for You in Paradise	我在天堂等你	Ou Muxin	
2007	Beautiful Life	笑着活下去	Yang Wenbang	
2007	—N/a	柳树屯	Shen Tianliang	
2008	If These Walls Could Talk	你的生命我的决定	Zhang Dali	
2008	Stone Scissors Cloth	石头、剪刀、布	Xu Tao	
2008	Honorable Years	光荣岁月	Zou Dalun	
2008	Seven Days that Shocked the World	震撼世界的七日	Jiang Hui	
2008	Life Is Beautiful	美丽人生	Li Qiang	
2009	Jianghu Brothers	江湖兄弟	Tang Haoqiang	
2009	—N/a	新情义无价	Wei Kang	
2009	Black Triangle	黑三角	Shi Yan	
2010	War of Father	父亲的战争	Guan Yongbo	
2010	A Beautiful Daughter-in-law Era	媳妇的美好时代	Yu Wei	
2010	My Beautiful Life	我的美丽人生	Jin Bo	
2011	Forever Designation	永不磨灭的番号	Li Da Benshi	
2011	Blood Brothers	将·军	Xu Dadan	
2013	Three Gallants in Troubled Times	乱世三义	Tang Ziyi	
2013	The New Story of Editorial Department	新编辑部故事	Yuan Shuai	
2013	We Get Married	咱们结婚吧	Guo Ran	
2014	If You Are The One	非诚勿扰	Qin Fen	
2014	A Selfless Love	一场奋不顾身的爱情	Jiang Hai	

=== Drama ===
Year	English title	Chinese title	Co-star(s)	Notes
1998	Taxi	的哥	Hai Qing	
2010	Cherish Our Love Forever	将爱情进行到底	Fu Xinbo/ Tong Lei/ Zhao Lin	
2011	Beautiful Time	美好时代	Hai Qing	

== Singles ==
Year	English title	Chinese title	Notes
2011	General	将军	
2011	Code of Brotherhood	义气	
2013	My Life Has Given You	把命都给你了	

== Film and TV Awards ==
Year	Nominated work	Award	Category	Result	Notes
2002	The Dream of A Young Soldier	9th Beijing College Student Film Festival	Best Newcomer	Won	
2002	The Dream of A Young Soldier	8th Huabiao Awards	Outstanding New Actor	Won	
2003	The Dream of A Young Soldier	9th Golden Phoenix Awards	—N/a	Won	
2008	Chasing	14th Shanghai Television Festival	Best Actor	Won	
2010	A Beautiful Daughter-in-law Era	25th Golden Eagle Awards	Best Actor	Won	
2012	Forever Designation	18th Shanghai Television Festival	Best Actor	Won	
2015	Uncle Victory	5th Golden Koala Chinese Film Festival	Best Actor	Won	
