= Hai Qing =

Chinese actress (born 1978)

- 海清
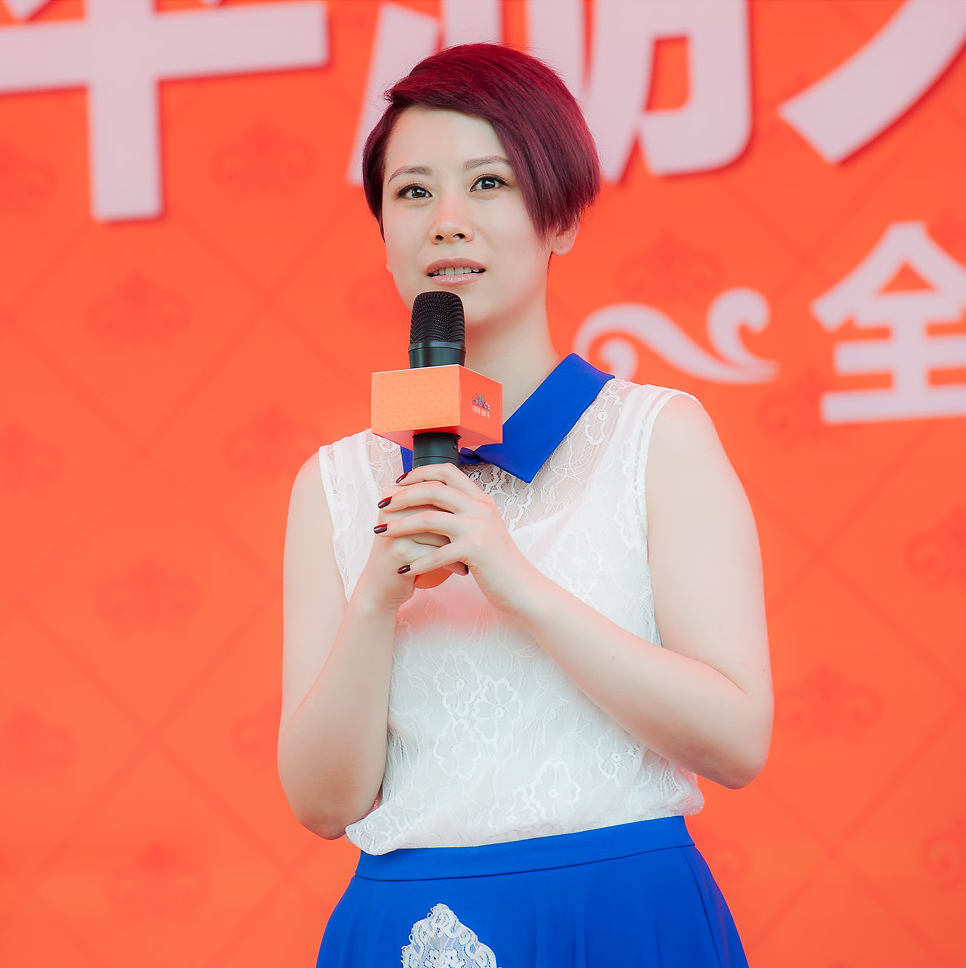
- Hai in 2013
- Born: 12 January 1977 (age 49); Gulou, Nanjing, China
- Education: Beijing Film Academy
- Occupation: Actress
- Years active: 1997–present

Hai Qing (Chinese: 海清; pinyin: Hǎi Qīng; born 12 January 1977) is a Chinese actress who has appeared in such films as Sacrifice (2010), Finding Mr. Right (2013), Operation Red Sea (2018), and Return to Dust (2022). For her role in the 2009–10 television series A Beautiful Daughter-in-law Era, she was nominated for numerous TV awards, including a Flying Apsaras Award for Best Actress and a Golden Eagle Award for Best Actress, which she both won. Hai ranked 36th on the Forbes China Celebrity 100 list in 2013, 46th in 2014, and 57th in 2015. In 2015, she became the first UN Women National Ambassador for China.

== Biography ==
Hai was born in Gulou, Nanjing, on 12 January 1977. She began acting in television shows at the age of seven, before joining the Jiangsu Provincial Theater School at age twelve. In 1997, she was accepted to the Beijing Film Academy and shortly afterwards appeared in her first feature film, Jade Goddess of Mercy. Hai returned to the small screen a few years later, appearing in a number of supporting roles, before joining the cast of A Beautiful Daughter-in-law Era. As the character Guo Hai-ping, Hai went on to receive three award nominations: two at the Golden Eagle Awards and one at the Flying Apsaras Awards.

In 2015, while attending a United Nations HeForShe banquet, Hai was appointed the first UN Women goodwill ambassador for China by Assistant Secretary-General Lakshmi Puri. In this role, she became involved in the UN's "Step It Up for Gender Equality" campaign to end violence against women and help empower women in China.

In 2022, Hai starred opposite Wu Renlin in the Li Ruijun drama film Return to Dust.

== Selected filmography ==
=== Film ===
List of film appearances, with year, title, and role shown
Year	Title	Role	Notes
2010	Sacrifice	Cheng Ying's wife	
2013	Finding Mr. Right	Zhou Yi	
2018	Operation Red Sea	Xia Nan	
2021	My Country, My Parents	Younger sister (adult); astronaut	
2022	Return to Dust	Cao Guiying	
2023	The Volunteers: To the War	Lin Qiaozhi	
2023	Beyond the Clouds	Zhang Guimei	

=== Television ===
List of film appearances, with year, title, and role shown
Year	Title	Role	Notes/Ref.
2003	Jade Goddess of Mercy	Zhong Ning	
2009	Dwelling Narrowness	Guo Haiping	
2009–10	A Beautiful Daughter-in-law Era	Mao Doudou	
2017	Midnight Diner	Hai Fen	3 episodes
2019	A Little Reunion	Tong Wenjie	3 episodes
2023	Why Try to Change Me Now	Donxin Fu	6 episodes

== Awards and nominations ==
Year	Award	Category	Nominated work	Result	Ref.
2020	7th Actors of China Awards	Best Actress (Sapphire)	—N/a	Nominated	
