= Changsha coup =

Mutiny in Changsha, China

Changsha Coup (Ma-Ri Incident)
- Part of Chinese Civil War (First United Front breakdown)
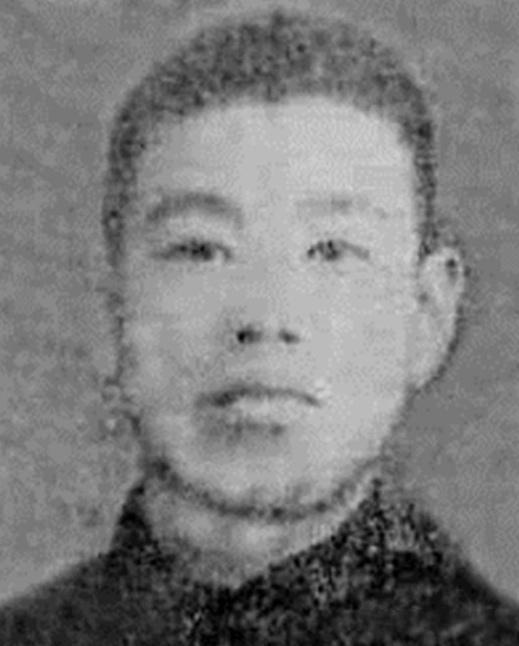
- Xu Kexiang
Date	1927 may 21–22,
Location	Changsha, Hunan, China
Result	The Kuomintang's right-wing victory

Belligerents
Kuomintang (National Revolutionary Army, right wing)	Chinese Communist Party

Commanders and leaders
Xu Kexiang; He Jian	Xia Xi; Tian Boyang (executed); Yang Zhaozhi (executed)

Strength
Hunan provincial forces and NRA units	Workers' militia and local Communist organizations

Casualties and losses
Unknown (minor compared to opponents)	Thousands were killed

The Changsha coup was a mutiny in Changsha on the evening of May 21, 1927. It was led by Xu Keqiang (許克祥), a regiment commander under General Tang Shengzhi. Up to "several thousands" of peasants were killed in the coup.On January 26, 1923, Sun Yat-sen and Soviet Deputy Foreign Minister Adolph Joffe issued a joint statement and adopted a policy of alliance with Russia and tolerance of the Chinese Communist Party (CCP). However, this was because the Soviet Union wanted to use the Kuomintang to develop the power of the CCP. The division within the Kuomintang led to a series of events, including the Xishan Conference in 1925, the Zhongshan Warship Incident in 1926, the Party Reorganization Plan in 1926, and the Joint Conference in 1926.In April 1923, the Central Committee of the Kuomintang sent Xia Xi and Liu Shaoqi, cross-party members of the CCP, back to Hunan to secretly reorganize the local organization of the Kuomintang in Hunan with Qin Zhen. Mao Zedong wrote to Li Weihan, requesting the Hunan District Committee of the CCP to assist Qin and others in carrying out Kuomintang work. In May 1925, the first provincial congress of the Kuomintang in Hunan Province was secretly held in Changsha, and the Kuomintang Hunan Provincial Party Headquarters was formally established. Eleven executive committee members and three supervisory committee members were elected. Except for Li Rongzhi, Luo Zonghan and Qiu Weizhen, who were left-wing Kuomintang members, the rest were CCP members with Kuomintang membership, accounting for 77% of the total.
