= 10th Macau International Movie Festival =

2018 Chinese film awards ceremony

The 10th Macau International Movie Festival (simplified Chinese: 第10届澳门国际电影节; traditional Chinese: 第10屆澳門國際電影節) were held in Macau by the Macau Film and Television Media Association in December 2018.

== Winners and nominees ==
Best Picture: A Cool Fish–Rao Xiaozhi; Invisible Tattoo–Lu Yitong; L Storm–David Lam; Forever Young–Li Fangfang; Hidden Man–Jiang Wen; Operation Red Sea–Dante Lam; Enter the Forbidden City–Hu Mei; Legend of the Demon Cat–Chen Kaige; Detective Dee: The Four Heavenly Kings–Tsui Hark; The Wind Guardians–Liu Kuo	Best Director: Hu Mei–Enter the Forbidden City; Tsui Hark–Detective Dee: The Four Heavenly Kings; Jiang Wen–Hidden Man; Chen Kaige–Legend of the Demon Cat; Dante Lam–Operation Red Sea
Best Actor: Chen Jianbin–A Cool Fish; Wang Leehom–Forever Young; Louis Koo–L Storm; Eddie Peng–Hidden Man; Vincent Zhao–Invisible Tattoo	Best Actress: Zhang Ziyi–Forever Young; Zhou Yun–Hidden Man; Hai Qing–Operation Red Sea; Ren Suxi–A Cool Fish; Ma Yili–Enter the Forbidden City
Best Supporting Actor: Pan Binlong–A Cool Fish; Zhang Hanyu–Operation Red Sea; Jiao Huang–Enter the Forbidden City; Gao Yalin– I Am the Procurator; Lin Gengxin–Detective Dee: The Four Heavenly Kings	Best Supporting Actress: Wang Ziwen–Enter the Forbidden City; Carina Lau–Detective Dee: The Four Heavenly Kings; Xu Qing–Hidden Man; Zhang Yuqi–Legend of the Demon Cat; Stephy Tang–L Storm
Best Writing: Sunshine that can Move Mountains–Wang Qiang; Forever Young–Li Fangfang; Enter the Forbidden City–Zou Jingzhi; A Cool Fish–Rao Xiaozhi and Lei Zhilong; As Scent Passes–Tang Peilu, Chen Danlu, Xu Yi, Yue Xiaokun, and You Na	Best Cinematography: Invisible Tattoo–Aymerick Pilarski; Sunshine that can Move Mountains–Wei Zhijie; Operation Red Sea–Feng Yuanwen and Huang Yongheng; Forever Young–Cao Yu; The Secret of Immortal Code–Li Wei
Best Newcomer: Dai Han Anni–Love You	Best New Director: Li Jiaxx–Don't Walk Away; Xia Wen–外八行之黄金罗盘
Grand Jury Prize: Forever Young	Outstanding Contribution Award of Chinese Films: Chui Po Chu
