= 8th Beijing College Student Film Festival =

2001 film festival in Beijing, China

The 8th Beijing College Student Film Festival (simplified Chinese: 第八届北京大学生电影节; traditional Chinese: 第八屆北京大學生電影節) was held in 2001 in Beijing, China.

== Awards ==
- Best Film Award: A Love of Blueness
- Best Director Award: Xia Gang for As Light as Glass
- Best Actor Award: Zhang Guoli for Sigh
- Best Actress Award: Yuan Quan for A Love of Blueness
- Best Visual Effects Award: Crouching Tiger, Hidden Dragon
- Best Newcomer Award: Huang Kai for As Light as Glass
- Favorite Actor Award: Chen Jianbin for Chrysanthemum Tea
- Favorite Actress Award: Wu Yue for Chrysanthemum Tea
- Favorite Film: The Gua Sha Treatment
- Artistic Exploration Award: None
- Grand Prix Award: Song of Tibet, The Gua Sha Treatment
- Committee Special Award: To be With You Forever, Fragrant Vows, Liu Tianhua
- Special Award of Merit: Xie Tieli
- Special Education Award: Silent river
