= Crime Crackdown =

- Traditional Chinese: 掃黑風暴
- Simplified Chinese: 扫黑风暴
- Hanyu Pinyin: Sǎohēi Fēngbào
- Genre: Crime drama
- Written by: Du Liang
- Directed by: Wu Bai
- Starring: Sun Honglei; Lay Zhang; Liu Yijun
- Country of origin: China
- Original language: Mandarin
- No. of seasons: 1
- No. of episodes: 28

Production
- Executive producers: Huang Xing; Li Yue
- Production companies: Central Political and Legal Affairs Commission; Penguin Film and Television; China Chang'an Publishing Media; Zhongguang Film and Television; Wu Yuan Culture Company

Original release
- Network: Dragon Television; Beijing TV
- Release: August 9 – September 23, 2021

Crime Crackdown (Chinese: 扫黑风暴) is a 2021 Chinese crime drama series written by Du Liang, directed by Wu Bai, and starring Sun Honglei, Lay Zhang and Liu Yijun. Based on several real-life cases that shook China in the 2010s, the series follows a national anti-gang supervising group and local police officers as they take on gangs and the corrupt officials that offer these illegal groups a "protective umbrella". The series premiered on Dragon Television and Beijing TV on 9 August 2021.

== Cast ==
=== Main ===
- Sun Honglei as Li Chengyang (李成阳), former criminal police, the current executive vice president (later acting president) and legal adviser of Xinshuai Group.
- Lay Zhang as Lin Hao (林浩), criminal police.
- Liu Yijun as He Yong (何勇), criminal police and leader of the 915 Task Force.

=== Supporting ===
- Wu Yue as He Yun (贺芸), executive deputy director of lüteng Municipal Public Security Bureau and director of its Anti-Gang Office, mother of Sun Xing.
- Jiang Shuying as Huang Xi (黄希), a reporter, niece of He Yun.
- Wang Zhifei as Gao Mingyuan (高明远), chairman of Changteng Capital.
- Liu Zhibing as Luo Shanhe (骆山河), leader of the 36th Steering Group of the Central Anti-Triad and Evil Forces.
- Wu Xiaoliang as Sun Xing (birth name Gao He) (孙兴（高赫）), boss of a naked loan company, son of Gao Mingyuan and He Yun.
- Ning Li as Ma Shuai (马帅), chairman of Xinshuai Group.
- Che Xiao as Li Lijuan (李丽涓), a director of Xinshuai Group, wife of Ma Shuai.
- Su Ke as Da Jiang (大江), a gang member, best buddy of Li Chengyang.
- Tan Kai as Dong Yao (董耀), governor of Shimen District in lüteng.
- Hou Changrong as Zhao Ligen (赵立根), executive deputy secretary of the Political and Legal Affairs Commission of Zhongjiang Province and director of the Provincial Anti-Gang Office.
- Sun Hao as Hu Xiaowei (胡笑伟), local police station director.
- Zhou Xiao'ou as Chen Jianbo (陈建波), boss of Jian'an Civil Explosion Company.
- Wang Jundi as Zheng Yihong (郑毅红), president of Hezhong Media Company, adopted daughter of Gao Mingyuan.
- Zhou Zhi as Yu Jingjing (于京京)
- Zhao Xiaorui as Cao Peng (曹鹏), communist party secretary of Yihe village.
- Zheng Xiaoning as Wang Zheng (王政), executive vice governor of Zhongjiang Province.
- Jiang Ruijia as Mai Jia (麦佳), mistress of Gao Mingyuan.
- Jiang Han as Cao Xiaofeng (曹晓峰), son of Cao Peng.
- Guo Qiucheng as Xie Zhonglin (谢中林), mayor of lüteng.

== Soundtrack ==
No.	Title	Lyrics	Music	Singer(s)	Length
1.	"Guard (守护)" (Opening theme)	Song Qingsong, Li Yue and Jin Yingda	Jin Yingda	Zheng Yunlong
2.	"Ideal (理想)" (Interlude)	Jin Yingda	Jin Yingda	GAI Zhou Ting
3.	"Grey (灰)" (Interlude)	Li Yue, Jin Yingda and Feng	Jin Yingda	Mao Amin
4.	"Brothers (兄弟)" (Interlude)	Jin Yingda	Jin Yingda	Sun Hao

== Production ==
In May 2019, Huang Xing (黄星) and Li Yue (李跃) had joined the project as general producers. They received support from the Central Political and Legal Affairs Commission, which gave them access to case files. The series took inspiration from Sun Xiaoguo's case in Yunnan, Huang Hongfa's case (黄鸿发案件) in Hainan, and Du Shaoping's case (杜少平操场埋尸案) and Wen Liehong's case (文烈宏涉黑案) in Hunan.

== Reception ==
Crime Crackdown earned a 7.3/10 on Chinese media review platform Douban from more than 277,000 reviews and nearly 2.70 billion views on Chinese streaming platform Tencent Video.
