= Li Jingfei =

Chinese actor (1957–2022)

- 李靖飞
- Born: 13 October 1957; Shijiazhuang, Hebei, China
- Died: 24 November 2022 (aged 65); Shijiazhuang, Hebei, China
- Occupation: Actor
- Years active: 1986–2011
- Children: 1

Chinese name
- Simplified Chinese: 李靖飞
- Traditional Chinese: 李靖飛
Transcriptions
Standard Mandarin
- Hanyu Pinyin: Lǐ Jìngfēi

Li Jingfei (Chinese: 李靖飞; 13 October 1957 – 24 November 2022) was a Chinese actor noted for his role as Zhang Fei in the television series Romance of the Three Kingdoms (1994).

== Biography ==
Li was born in Shijiazhuang, Hebei, on 13 October 1957.

Li made his screen debut with a supporting role in the 1986 war film Sabotage Operation, which was also his only film. Li gained national fame for his starring role as Zhang Fei in the 1994 television series Romance of the Three Kingdoms, adapted from Luo Guanzhong's masterpiece of the same title. In 1997, he starred as Fu Gai, reuniting him with co-star Lu Shuming and Sun Yanjun, in the 1997 historical television series Sun Wu. In 1999, he played a supporting role in the biographical television series Zhu Yuanzhang: the Boy of Fengyang, starring Fang Zibin and Dai Yunxia and directed by Zhang Zhongyi. In 2004, he had a supporting role in Crimson Romance, a romantic comedy television series starring Liu Ye and Sun Li. In 2007, he landed a supporting role in the biographical television series Merchant General, opposite Yan Danchen and Heizi. In 2008, he played a supporting role in the drama television series Life is Beautiful, alongside Li Xuejian and Wu Yue. In 2011, he cooperated with Sun Yanjun and Lu Shuming for the third time to play the role of Bo Yahao in the mythical drama Strange Destiny of Fragrant Hills.

== Personal life and death ==
Li had a daughter named Li Yaoyao (李尧垚).

In his later years, Li suffered from cerebral infarction. On 24 November 2022, he died from an illness in Shijiazhuang, Hebei, at the age of 65.

== Filmography ==
=== Film ===
Year	English title	Chinese title	Role	Notes
1986	Sabotage Operation	破袭战	Zhuangzi	

=== Television ===
Year	English title	Chinese title	Role	Notes
1994		京九情		
1994	Romance of the Three Kingdoms	三国演义	Zhang Fei	
1997	Sun Wu	孙武	Fu Gai	
1999	Zhu Yuanzhang: the Boy of Fengyang	凤阳小子朱元璋		
2004	Crimson Romance	血色浪漫	Chuizi	
2007	A Yard Full of Sunshine	洒满阳光的小院	Old Gui	
2007	Merchant General	商贾将军	Big Hu	
2008	Life is Beautiful	美丽人生	Zhang Dapeng	
2011	Strange Destiny of Fragrant Hills	香山奇缘	Bo Yahao	

=== Drama ===
English title	Chinese title	Role	Notes
Life is Beautiful	美丽人生	Fang Gang	
Li Dazhao	李大钊	Zhang Zuolin	
