= Zhao Lixin =

Chinese-Swedish actor

- Born: 29 August 1968 (age 58); Zhengzhou, Henan, China
- Education: Central Academy of Drama
- Occupation: Actor

Chinese name
- Simplified Chinese: 赵立新
- Traditional Chinese: 趙立新
Transcriptions
Standard Mandarin
- Hanyu Pinyin: Zhào Lìxīn

Zhao Lixin (Chinese: 赵立新, born August 29, 1968) is a Chinese-Swedish actor.

== Biography ==
Because his father worked in Xinhua Bookstore, Zhao Lixin had been exposed to a large number of books when he was a child, and he began to try recitations and performances in high school. At the age of 18, he was admitted to the Central Academy of Drama. Because of the better sound conditions, he often took on the dubbing work with his senior brother Zhang Hanyu when he was in school. At the end of his sophomore year, he was selected to go to the All-Union State Institute of Cinematography in Moscow for further study. After graduating from the Central Academy of Drama, Zhao Lixin applied for the Directing Department of the Moscow Film Academy and graduated in 1995 with a master's degree in that department. Later, he brought a recommendation letter from his tutor to Stockholm and was admitted to the Royal Swedish Theater, becoming the first Chinese actor to appear on stage since the establishment of the theater.

In 2001, he starred in the modern historical TV series Towards the Republic directed by Zhang Li, as a member of the Senate, Luo Wen joined the line. In 2010, he played the actor Li Xia in the TV series The Electric Wave That Never Dies. In 2015, he played the role of Chen Qiqian, an assistant engineer of the 202 factory, He won the Magnolia Award for Best Supporting Actor in the 22nd Shanghai TV Festival. At the beginning of 2018, it became popular again due to its outstanding performance in the variety show Sound on the Scene.

In 2019, Zhao was in the center of a scandal regarding his post on Sina Weibo, where to his readers he appeared to be defending Japanese invaders.

== Filmography ==
=== Television series ===
Year	English title	Role	Notes
2003	Towards the Republic	Rowan	
2007	Da Ming Dynasty 1566	Shen Yishi	
2008	My Past in China	the young master Cao Guangman	
2010	Blood Aloes	Zhou Xiuzhang	
2010	The Electric Wave That Never Dies	Li Xia	
2011	Opening the World	Chiang Kai-shek	
2011	Journey to the West	Jin Yuanzi	
2011	Madeer Hotel Gunshots	Yamura	
2011	The Revolution of 1911	Yang Du	
2012	Nine Rivers into the Sea	Hai Zixuan/Hai Zipei	
2013	Cao Cao	Cao Cao	
2014	Rice City	Yao Zhennan	
2014	Xiao Bao and Lao Cai	Gan Ke	
2014	Marriage Cooking	poplar	
2014	Happiness will be broadcast later		
2015	In the Silent Place	Chen Qiqian	
2015	Dad Father	Su Mingyuan	
2015	Years Are Like Gold	Kevin	
2015	Miyue Biography	Zhang Yi	
2016	Qing Yunzhi	Zhou Yixian	
2016	Chinese-style relationship	Shen Yun	
2017	Mr. Cultivation Record	Zhao Wenyu	
2017	The Legend of the Condor Heroes	Hong Qigong	
2017	Hunting Field	Tu Fangzhi	Guest
2018	Great Expectations	Lu Yusheng	
2018	As Young as Us		
2018	The Rise of Phoenixes	Xin Ziyan	
2020	I haven't loved enough (original name: "Love me, do you dare?")	Chen Fei	originally played the "non-mainstream" father of Chen Jiong, Chen Fei, a bohemian and unrestrained man in his 50s and 60s who also rode in a Harley bar, but the scene was deleted and starred by the actor Feng Lei, the name did not appear in the cast list.
2020	Wind Sound	Longchuan	originally played Longchuan. The facial scenes were modified by the computer to be performed by the actor Yi Wei, and the name did not appear in the cast.
2020	The Love of Hypnosis	Wei Zhishen	
TBA	Wind and Rain Send Spring	Yu Zhongjun	
TBA	Red-Holmes	Mao Ding	
TBA	Abandoned Soldier	Ying Feng	
TBA	Heroic Age·Yanhuang Emperor	Yandi	
TBA	Top Secret		
TBA	Nanyanzhai transcript		

=== Movie ===
Year	English title	Role	Notes
1999	Vägen ut	Cheng	
2013	Silent Witness	the driver of Lin Tai	
2014	Xiuchundao	Han Xu	
2015	Return to 20	Xiang Guobin	
2015	Runaway Detective	the director	
2015	The Legend of White Ghost Desperate Escape	the leader of the Imperial Forest Army	
2015	Junior Class	the principal	
2016	I Am Not Pan Jinlian	Shi Weimin	
2017	Six Dinner	black leather	
2017	Fanghua	Ning political commissar	
2018	God of War	Tali Hutai	
2018	IASO PASSWORD	Yao Xianyuan	
2018	Chinese Partner 2	Chu Zhenhui	
TBA	The Sun Never Sets		
TBA	Longling Misty Cave	Professor Sun	

=== Theater ===
Year	English title	Role	Notes
2016	Lu Xun	Lu Xun	written by Li Jing and directed by Wang Chong, named "the Best Chinese Production of the Year" by The Beijing News

== Screenwriter ==
- TV series My Past in China.

== Dispute ==
In early April 2019, Zhao Lixin posted on Sina Weibo, "Why did the Japanese occupy Beijing for eight years, why didn't they snatch the cultural relics from the Forbidden City and burn the Forbidden City? Is this in line with the nature of the invaders?", "Why did the British and French coalition forces burn the Old Summer Palace?" and other remarks. It attracted the attention of many netizens and was questioned as absolving the Japanese aggressor. Subsequently, the official media such as Ziguangge, the Central Committee of the Communist Youth League, China Anti-cult and other official media criticized Zhao Lixin's views. After the public outcry, Zhao Lixin deleted the related controversial Weibo and issued a statement of apology on April 3. Shortly after (April 6), his personal Weibo was cancelled, and his studio official Weibo also deleted all content. Sina "Weibo Administrator" announced on the afternoon of April 16 that a batch of accounts that posted harmful information about current affairs had been investigated and dealt with, including Weibo of actor Zhao Lixin.
