= Mr. Donkey =

- Poster
- Chinese: 驢得水
- Directed by: Zhou Shen; Liu Lu
- Written by: Zhou Shen; Liu Lu
- Produced by: Zhang Li; Sa Qiri
- Starring: Ren Suxi; Da Li; Liu Shuailiang; Pei Kuishan; Ke Runa; Han Yanbo; Bu Guanjin; Wang Kun
- Cinematography: Jong Lin
- Edited by: Yang Yang; Li Chuang-yang; Zhou Shen
- Music by: Liu Zhou
- Production companies: Beijing Sili Media; Beijing Happy Twist Film; Tianjin Maoyan Media; Bei Jing Ying Xing Tian Xia Culture Communication
- Distributed by: Tianjin Maoyan Media; Huaxia Film Distribution
- Release date: 28 October 2016
- Running time: 111 minutes
- Country: China
- Language: Mandarin
- Box office: CN¥173 million

Mr. Donkey is a 2016 Chinese comedy-drama film directed by Zhou Shen and Liu Lu and starring Ren Suxi, Da Li, Liu Shuailiang, Pei Kuishan, Ke Runa, Han Yanbo, Bu Guanjin and Wang Kun. It was released in China by Tianjin Maoyan Media and Huaxia Film Distribution on 28 October 2016.

== Plot ==
A rural school is using a nonexistent teacher's salary to feed a water mule. This state of affairs, is however, endangered by an unexpected arrival of an inspector. He turns out to be looking for region's best teacher, eligible for American benefactor Ross' grant. In order to maintain the charade, a handyman who happens to be repairing school's only bell is then dressed up and passed off as an English teacher. He is given a name Lǘ De Shui, almost same as the Donkey (驴 Lǘ) called 的水 (De Shui). Luckily, the inspector knows no more English than the word "OK," meaning that the group are able to fool him into believing that the coppersmith is, in fact, fluent in English. After the inspector leaves, the teachers celebrate receiving first 30000 yuan of grant money. However, to make the superstitious repairman undergo the feared process of taking a photograph in order to appease the inspector, the female teacher, Yi Man, decides to sleep with him, making his lovesick colleague, Gui Shan, jealous. After being refused by Yi Man, Gui Shan spends grant money on expensive items such as a fur coat, and refuses to pledge in to build a new classroom, opposing the others in the group. Later, they receive word that the inspector is going to come back again, this time with Mr. Ross. The repairman and his wife arrive at the school, the latter looking for the woman with whom her husband had cheated, violently angry. If the repairman is seen by Mr.Ross, an actual English speaker, he is sure to be found out as a fake, so Yi Man reveals herself to lure the couple out, and ends up gravely insulting the handyman in order to make him give up his feelings for her. When the inspector arrives, the group finds out that he has been stealing 70000 yuan every month, and that Ross insists on seeing Lu De Shui, the fake teacher. He comes in by himself, only agreeing to meet Ross if Yi Man is fired. Everybody convinces him to lower his demands, and he agrees to swap firing for insulting and cutting Yi Man's hair short, which is performed with great sorrow by the principal of the school. Gui Shan clearly enjoys calling his former beloved a dirty slut due to his resentment for her decision to sleep with the repairman. It is then revealed to the inspector that Lu DeShui is a fake, but the inspector cares little about the veracity of his identity in the face of Mr.Ross' donation, leading to his decision to use force to ensure the teachers' compliance. They end up faking the Repairman's death to prevent him from exposing his lack of credentials. Fearing that he was in part guilty for Lu De Shui's death because his arrival was the reason Lu De Shui was supposedly in such a hurry that he died on his way back, Mr.Ross offers additional money that he will only give to the family of Lu De Shui. The school's stablehand is coerced into posing as Lu De Shui's fiancé in order to get the money and ends up asking to be allowed to study in America, to which Mr.Ross agrees. Hearing this, the supposedly dead repairman sits up and asks for the same privilege. After convincing Mr.Ross that it was simply a miracle that Lu De Shui came back to life, Lu De Shui and the stablehand agree to be married to maintain the charade. During the wedding, the repairman's wife returns with a gun, ruining the ceremony, and inadvertently providing the humiliated Yi Man with a weapon. In the end, Yi Man commits suicide, and the school's stablehand leaves for Yan'an.

== Cast ==
- Ren Suxi as Zhang Yiman
- Da Li as Principal Sun
- Liu Shuailiang as Tienan
- Pei Kuishan as Pei Kuishan
- Ke Runa
- Han Yanbo
- Bu Guanjin as Sun Jia
- Wang Kun

== Reception ==
The film grossed CN¥173.053 million at the Chinese box office.

== Awards and nominations ==
Award ceremony	Category	Recipients	Result
17th Chinese Film Media Awards	Best Actress	Ren Suxi	Nominated
17th Chinese Film Media Awards	Best New Performer	Ren Suxi	Nominated
