= Cao Cao (TV series) =

Chinese television series

- Japanese DVD release poster
- Also known as: The Hero Cao Cao
- 曹操
- Genre: Historical drama
- Written by: Jin Leshi; He Yanjiang
- Directed by: Hu Mei
- Presented by: Lin Junbo; Yang Shoucheng
- Starring: Zhao Lixin; Sun Hongtao; Han Xue; Leo Ku
- Theme music composer: Ikurō Fujiwara
- Ending theme: "Heroic Bones and Tender Emotions" (侠骨柔情) by Mi Jing
- Country of origin: China
- Original language: Mandarin
- No. of episodes: 41

Production
- Executive producers: Wei Li; Xiang Qiong
- Production location: China
- Running time: ≈45 minutes per episode
- Production companies: Xin Hu Media Broadcast; Emperor Entertainment Group; Beijing Shi Le Jin Media Culture

Original release
- Network: Channel Ginga

Cao Cao (曹操) is a Chinese historical television series based on the life of Cao Cao, a warlord who rose to power towards the end of the Eastern Han dynasty and laid the foundation for the state of Cao Wei during the Three Kingdoms period. Directed by Hu Mei, the series aimed to portray a more historically accurate image of Cao Cao, who is traditionally depicted as a villain in Chinese culture. Starring Zhao Lixin as the eponymous character, the series was filmed at the Xiangshan Film City in Ningbo, Zhejiang between 1 November 2011 and 15 March 2012.

Cao Cao was not broadcast in China until 7 September 2015, when it started airing on Anhui Satellite TV and LeTV. Before that, the series had already been released on DVD in Japan on 4 September 2013. It was also aired on Channel Ginga in Japan on 5 January 2014, and on Chunghwa TV in South Korea from 6 October to 28 November 2014.

== Synopsis ==
The series is divided into seven parts spanning 41 episodes. It covers Cao Cao's life from his adolescent years and early career to the period just before the Battle of Red Cliffs.

Title	Episodes	Synopsis
Part 1: Hero of Chaos 第1部-乱世奸雄	1–6	Covers Cao Cao's adolescent years and his early career in the service of the Han imperial court.
Part 2: Decline of the Han Dynasty 第2部-漢室衰退	7–12	Covers Cao Cao's involvement in helping to suppress the Yellow Turban Rebellion and the chaotic political scene after the death of Emperor Ling.
Part 3: Defeating Dong Zhuo 第3部-打倒董卓	13–21	Covers Cao Cao's participation in the Campaign against Dong Zhuo.
Part 4: Supporting Emperor Xian 第4部-献帝擁立	21–26	Covers Cao Cao's battles against the Heishan Bandits, Tao Qian and Lü Bu, and his role in supporting Emperor Xian and establishing the new Han imperial capital in Xuchang.
Part 5: Lü Bu's Downfall 第5部-呂布滅亡	27–32	Covers the battles of Wancheng (against Zhang Xiu) and Xiapi (against Lü Bu).
Part 6: Battle of Guandu 第6部-官渡大戦	33–38	Covers the Battle of Guandu between Cao Cao and Yuan Shao.
Part 7: Before Red Cliffs 第7部-赤壁前夜	39–41	Covers Cao Cao's battles against Yuan Shao's heirs and his campaign to unify northern China.

== Cast ==
- Zhao Lixin as Cao Cao
  - Wang Han as Cao Cao (child)
- Gong Jie as Lady Bian
- Lei Kesheng as Cao Jie
- Li Lingyu as Lady Ding
- Leo Ku as Kong Rong
- Li Wenbo as Cao Song
- Jia Zhaoji as Cao Teng
- Yan Kun as Guo Jia
- Kan Jinming as Xun Yu
- Han Han as Cao Hong
- Sun Xuezheng as Cao Ren
- Chen Zexi as Cao Ang
  - Feng Yizhe as Cao Ang (child)
- Shen Bo as Cao Anmin
- Guo Zhan as Cao Pi
- Yin Junzheng as Xiahou Dun
- Wang Bin as Li Dian
- Wang Zhao as Xiahou Yuan
- Yun Feng as Cheng Yu
- Ding Jun as Zhang Liao
- Wu Hao as Yu Jin
- Zhao Mingming as Xu Chu
- Sun Yucheng as Dian Wei
- Wang Zhong as Yue Jin
- Sun Qi as Jia Xu
- Yan Kun as Liu Hong (Emperor Ling)
  - Lin Miaoke as Liu Hong (Emperor Ling) (child)
- Zhao Xuelian as Empress He
- Li Ying as Empress Dowager Dong
- Jiang Yi as Liu Xie (Emperor Xian)
  - Sun Xikun as Liu Xie (Emperor Xian) (child)
- Jin Mengqian as Lady Dong
- Ma Danni as Lady Tang
- Sun Hongtao as Yuan Shao
- Ding Kai as Yuan Shu
- Zhang Bo as Guo Tu
- Ma Yong as Shen Pei
- Lu Ya'ning as Xu You
- Li Jia as Zhang He
- Li Cong as Gao Lan
- Cao Zheng as Ju Shou
- Chen Youning as Yuan Tan
- Guo Kai as Yuan Xi
- Li Junbo as Yuan Shang
- Jin Pinglong as Yan Liang
- Zhang Qinglong as Wen Chou
- Hu Jian as Tian Feng
- Han Xue as Diaochan
- Zhang Yujie as Cai Wenji
- Sun Wanqing as Cai Yong
- Zhu Yanping as He Jin
- Cheng Wenkuan as Jian Shuo
- Shi Liming as Dong Zhuo
- Li Xiaowen as Wang Yun
- Gao Wen as Chen Gong
  - Lu Yijie as Chen Gong (child)
- Ge Ziming as Zhang Miao
- Yang Wei as Liu Bei
- Zhang Yiqun as Guan Yu
- Li Long as Zhang Fei
- Ying Feng as Lü Bu
- Zhao Xiaoguang as Han Fu
- Hao Gang as He Yong
- Yang Tianpeng as Li Jue
- Wang Tong as Guo Si
- Jia Wei as Bao Xin
- Li Ming as Dong Cheng
- Zhang Wenming as Zhang Xiu
- Wang Wei as Chen Deng
- Ma Xiaojun as Ji Ben
- Hu Xiaomeng as Sima Yi (child)
- Fang Shuai as Bo Cai
- Li Zijing as Yituzhiyashi
- Jing Qing as a Xiongnu prince
- Yue Hong as a brothel owner
- Wang Chen as a brothel owner
- Wang Wenwen as a pregnant woman

== See also ==
- List of media adaptations of Romance of the Three Kingdoms
