= Jiang Qinqin =

Chinese actress

- 蒋勤勤
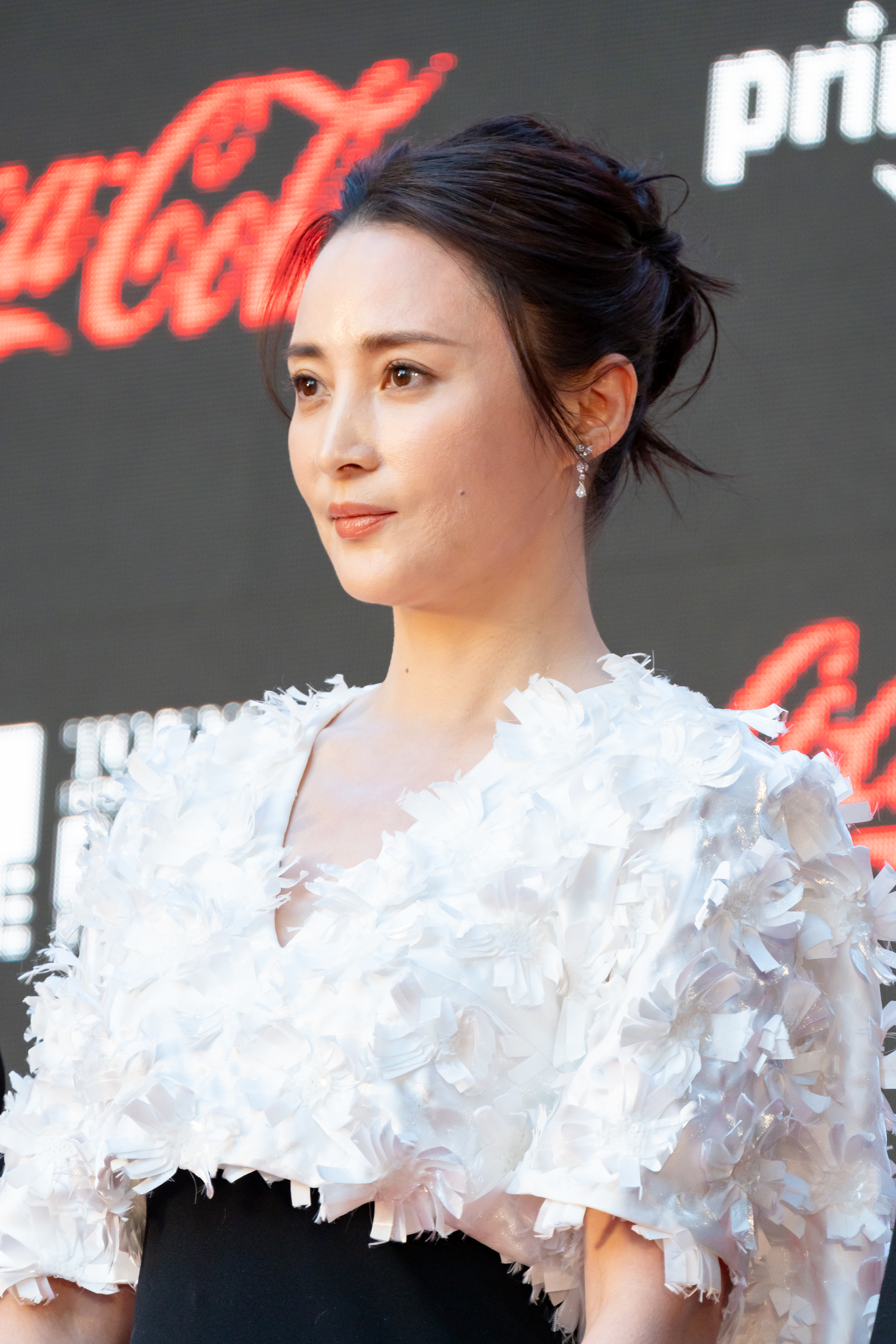
- Jiang at the 36th Tokyo International Film Festival in October 2023
- Born: 3 September 1975 (age 51); Chongqing, China
- Other names: Shui Ling; Angel Jiang
- Education: Beijing Film Academy
- Occupation: Actress
- Years active: 1992–present
- Political party: Chinese Communist Party
- Spouse: Chen Jianbin (m. 2006)
- Children: 2

Chinese name
- Simplified Chinese: 蒋勤勤
- Traditional Chinese: 蔣勤勤
Transcriptions
Standard Mandarin
- Hanyu Pinyin: Jiǎng Qínqín

Jiang Qinqin (Chinese: 蒋勤勤; pinyin: Jiǎng Qínqín; born 3 September 1975) is a Chinese actress. Early in her career, she was credited as Shui Ling (水灵; 水靈), a stage name given by Taiwanese writer Chiung Yao.

== Early life and education ==
Jiang was born in Chongqing on 3 September 1975. Her father was a policeman.

== Career ==
Jiang started learning Beijing Opera at the age of 10 and entered the Beijing Film Academy in 1994 after attaining first place in the entrance examination. In the second year of Jiang's study at the Beijing Film Academy, she was cast by director Yang Jie in the title role of Xishi in the television series of the same name. She then starred in Tears in Heaven, an adaptation of a novel by Chiung Yao, and rose to fame in China. Following that, she played a number of notable roles, including Gu Manlu in Affair of Half a Lifetime (2003) and Mu Nianci in The Legend of the Condor Heroes (2003). Jiang's performance in the historical drama Qiao's Grand Courtyard won her both Favorite TV Actress and the Audience's Favorite Actress Awards at the Golden Eagle TV Art Festival. Jiang has also starred in several films, notably My Sister's Dictionary and Seven Nights, for which she was awarded at the Golden Phoenix Awards.

== Personal life ==
Jiang married actor Chen Jianbin on February 22, 2006, whom she co-starred with in Qiao's Grand Courtyard. Their son was born on January 8, 2007.

== Filmography ==
=== Film ===
Year	English title	Chinese title	Role	Notes
1994	Bloody Brothers	新大小不良	Xiaoyao	
1995		铁血传奇	Fan Ruyu	
1997	Fitness Tour	减肥旅行团	Ms Jingjing	
2001	The Sino-Dutch War 1661	英雄郑成功	Xue Liang	
2005	My Sister’s Dictionary	姐姐词典	Niu Hongmei	
2005	Seven Nights	七夜	Song Yao	
2009	City of Dream	所有梦想都开花	Lin Fang	
2011	The Sun	大太阳	Ying Tao	
2014	Who is Undercover	一号目标	Lu Yiran	
2014	One Step Away	触不可及	Lu Qiuqi	
2015	A Fool	一个勺子	Jin Zhizi	
2017	The Door	完美有多美	Zhuo Yanni	
2024	Dwelling by the West Lake	草木人间	Wu Taihua	
2024	Big World	小小的我	Chen Lu	

=== Television series ===
Year	English title	Chinese title	Role	Notes
1992	Meitai Guanyin	媚态观音	Meitai Guanyin	
1996	Xishi	西施	Xishi	
1998	Kingdoms of the Spring and Autumn Period of the Eastern Zhou Dynasty	东周列国春秋篇	Qi Jiang	
1998	Xiaofengxian's Story	小凤仙的故事	Xiaofengxian	
1998	Tears in Heaven	苍天有泪	Xiao Yufeng	
1998		京都神探	Qi Menggu	
1999	Kangxi Incognito Travel	康熙微服私访记之八宝粥记	Zhu Yunqiao	
1999		流氓太子	Duan Yu	
1999	Romance of the White Haired Maiden	白发魔女	Lian Nichang	
1999	Master of Zen	达摩祖师	Hu Ji	
2000		神医华陀	Princess Rourou	
2000	Crouching Tiger, Hidden Dragon	卧虎藏龙	Yu Jiaolong	
2000	Grief Over QingHe River	青河绝恋	Shen Xinci / Liang Xiuyun	
2001		王中王	Princess Qianyun	
2001	Detective Collum	神探科蓝	Li Xing'er	
2002	The Four Detective Guards	四大名捕	Hei Hudie	
2002	Wind and Cloud	风云雄霸天下	Mingyue	
2003	My Fair Princess III	还珠格格三之天上人间	Xia Yingying	
2003	The Legend of the Condor Heroes	射雕英雄传	Mu Nianci	
2003	Affair of Half a Lifetime	半生缘	Gu Manlu	
2004	The Last Concubine	末代皇妃	Wenxiu	
2004	A Loud Slap	耳光响亮	Niu Hongmei	
2004	World of Heroic Duo	风云争霸	Beitang Xing'er	
2005	Han Women	大汉巾帼	Xin Zhui	
2006	Qiao's Grand Courtyard	乔家大院	Lu Yuhan	
2006	If the Moon has Eyes	如果月亮有眼睛	Fan Meiyin	
2006		香粉世家	Lianyi	
2009	Four Generations Under One Roof	四世同堂	Yunmei	
2011	Epoch-Making	开天辟地	Song Qingling	
2011	China 1945	中国1945之重庆风云	Song Meiling	
2011	The Great Time	大时代	Liang Hongyu	
2014	Grandpa's Anti Japanese War	姥爷的抗战	Tan Liping	
2017		田姐辣妹	Tian Jiahui	
2017	Tribes and Empires: Storm of Prophecy	九州·海上牧云记	Nanku Mingyi	
2020	The Burning River	迷雾追踪	Lin Yuhong	
2021	Marvelous Woman	当家主母	Shen Cuixi	

== Awards and nominations ==
Year	Award	Category	Nominated work	Result	Ref.
2001	24th Hundred Flowers Awards	Best Actress	The Sino-Dutch War 1661	Nominated	
2004	24th Golden Rooster Awards	Best Actress	My Sister's Dictionary	Nominated	
2005	12th Beijing College Student Film Festival	Best Actress	My Sister's Dictionary	Nominated	
2005	10th Golden Phoenix Awards	Society Award	My Sister's Dictionary	Won	
2006	23rd China TV Golden Eagle Award	Best Actress	Qiao's Grand Courtyard	Won	
2006	6th China Golden Eagle TV Arts Festival	Most Popular Actress	Qiao's Grand Courtyard	Won	
2007	26th Flying Apsaras Awards	Outstanding Actress	Qiao's Grand Courtyard	Won	
2009	13th Huabiao Awards	Outstanding Actress	City of Dream	Nominated	
2011	28th Golden Rooster Awards	Best Supporting Actress	The Sun	Nominated	
2012	11th Changchun Film Festival	Best Supporting Actress	The Sun	Nominated	
2015	7th China Image Film Festival	Best Actress	A Fool	Won	
2016	1st Gold Aries Award Macau International Film Festival	Best Actress	A Fool	Won	
2016	23rd Beijing College Student Film Festival	Best Actress	A Fool	Nominated	
2024	17th Asian Film Awards	Best Actress	Dwelling by the West Lake	Won	
2024	31st Beijing College Student Film Festival	Favorite Actress	Dwelling by the West Lake	Won	
2025	38th Golden Rooster Awards	Best Supporting Actress	Big World	Nominated	
