= A Cool Fish =

- Traditional Chinese: 無名之輩
- Simplified Chinese: 无名之辈
- Hanyu Pinyin: Wú Míng Zhī Bèi
- Directed by: Rao Xiaozhi
- Written by: Rao Xiaozhi; Lei Zhilong
- Produced by: Liang Lin
- Starring: Chen Jianbin; Ren Suxi; Pan Binlong; Zhang Yu
- Cinematography: Li Jian
- Edited by: Derek Hui
- Music by: Deng Ouge
- Production company: Emperor Motion Pictures
- Distributed by: Emperor Motion Pictures
- Release date: 16 November 2018 (China)
- Running time: 108 minutes
- Country: China
- Languages: Southwestern Mandarin, Sichuanese, Chongqinghua
- Box office: $90.1 million

A Cool Fish (Chinese: 无名之辈; pinyin: Wú Míng Zhī Bèi) is a 2018 Chinese comedy drama film directed and co-written by Rao Xiaozhi, and starring Chen Jianbin, Ren Suxi, Pan Binlong, and Zhang Yu. The film tells the story of several nobodies, including a cop-turned-security guard Ma Xiaoyong, his sister Ma Jiaqi, and two thieves Li Haigen and Hu Guangsheng. The film premiered in China on November 16, 2018.

== Plot ==
Two robbers rob a cell phone store with a gun. They attempt to escape on their motorcycle but they slip and the motorcycle ends up hanging on a pole out of their reach. Evading the police, they run through alleys and break into the house of Ma Jiaqi, a quadriplegic woman. They threaten to shoot her but when she dares them do do it they can't go through with it.

Meanwhile, security guard Ma Xianyong (the older brother of Jiaqi) is being beat up by his old boss. He found a gun buried at a construction site and it has gone missing. He is unable to repay loans, buys fruit on credit, and can't even pay for his daughter's high school fees. He takes an interest in the robbery despite not being in the police force. He bought an apartment owned by bankrupt real estate agent Gao Ming and used the gun to threaten him - but was seen by his son Gao Xiang who is also close with his daughter.

A fat young man named Bobby who works at a spa is incorrectly identified as the thief. Xianyong tracks him down and tortures him. Bobby himself was robbed by the robbers and he leads Xianyong to the spa, rife with prostitution. Then the police raid it and he is arrested in the process. His daughter berates him for what she thinks he is involved in.

Jiaqi successfully orders the robbers around and convinces them to stay inside. They follow all her orders and do things for her. All the phones that the two robbers stole are revealed to be plastic models. They gain notoriety online and everyone loses their tempers when a news report about the theft plays on Jiaqi's TV.

The robbers take Jiaqi to the roof where they continue fighting. A flashback shows how she became quadriplegic in a car crash where Xianyong was also in the car. Xianyong shows up at the door to talk to Jiaqi.

At a protest where Ming's unpaid business clients demand their money back, Xiang takes the gun and intends to get revenge, accidentally shooting Xianyong. Xiang's high school classmates get in fights with the henchmen there. Xianyong is hospitalized. The robbers show up at the scene and get into Xianyong's ambulance. Xianyong threatens them with the fake gun and Guangsheng pulls out the real one. As the ambulance departs, Guangsheng shoots Xianyong, attracting the police. Xianyong sprays water in their faces with the fake gun and they give themselves up to the police. Xianyong reconciles with his daughter.

== Cast ==
- Chen Jianbin as Ma Xianyong, a cop-turned-security guard on the construction site.
- Ren Suxi as Ma Jiaqi, younger sister of Ma Xianyong, a quadriplegic.
- Pan Binlong as Li Haigen, nicknamed Big Head, thief.
- Zhang Yu as Hu Guangsheng, nicknamed Bra (short for Cobra), thief.
- Ma Yinyin as Zhenzhen, a masseuse.
- Wang Yanhui as Gao Ming, a bankrupt real estate developer.
- Cheng Yi as Liu Wenhong, Gao Ming's lover.
- Ning Huanyu as Gao Xiang, Gao Ming's son.
- Lu Kung-wei as Wang Shuncai, Ma Jiaqi's landlord.
- Deng Enxi as Ma Yiyi, Ma Xianyong's daughter.
- Fan Xiang as Ren Xiaochong, police captain.
- Xie Bo as Bo Zai.

== Production ==
The film is Rao Xiaozhi's second feature.

== Soundtrack ==
No.	Title	Lyrics	Music	Singer(s)	Length
1.	"A Cool Fish (无名之辈)" (Opening theme)	Silence Wang, Chen Huan	Chen Huan	Silence Wang
2.	"Wait a Second (等一等)" (Ending theme)	Fan Chong	Fan Chong	Ren Suxi
3.	"Hu Guangsheng (胡广生)" (Promotional song)	Ren Suxi	Ren Suxi	Ren Suxi
4.	"Nameless Love (无名之爱)" (Propaganda song)	Yang Bingyin	Lei Zhilong	Cheng Yi, Ma Yinyin

== Release ==
The film was released on November 16, 2018, in mainland China, and on November 22, 2018, in Hong Kong.

A Cool Fish earned $1.2 million its first three days alone, and grossed $24.2 million on its first weekend. The film earned a total of $90.1 million.

== Reception ==
Douban, a major Chinese media rating site, gave the drama 8.1 out of 10.

== Accolades ==
Date	Award	Category	Recipient(s) and nominee(s)	Result	Notes
2018	10th Macau International Movie Festival	Best Picture	A Cool Fish	Won	
2018	10th Macau International Movie Festival	Best Actor	Chen Jianbin	Won	
2018	10th Macau International Movie Festival	Best Actress	Ren Suxi	Nominated	
2018	10th Macau International Movie Festival	Best Supporting Actor	Pan Binlong	Won	
2019	1st Duyun Film and Television Festival	Best Actor	Pan Binlong	Won	
