= Students' Choice Award for Favorite Actress =

Film award category

The Students' Choice Award for Favorite Actress (Chinese: 北京大学生电影节最受欢迎女演员奖) is a main category of Beijing College Student Film Festival.

== Winners ==
Year	Recipient	Film
2026	Ma Li	The Dumpling Queen
2025	Yong Mei	Like a Rolling Stone
2025	Zhang Zifeng	After Typhoon
2024	Jiang Qinqin	Dwelling by the West Lake
2023	Xi Meijuan	Song of Spring
2022	Zhe Gong	Island Keeper
2021	Xu Fan	All About My Mother
2019	Tong Liya	How Long Will I Love U
2018	Yang Mi	Brotherhood of Blades 2
2017	Zhao Liying	Duckweed
2016	Miriam Yeung	Little Big Master
2015	Wang Likun	Somewhere Only We Know
2014	Gwei Lun-mei	Black Coal, Thin Ice
2014	Angelababy	Young Detective Dee: Rise of the Sea Dragon
2013	Zhang Yuqi	White Deer Plain
2012	Yan Ni	The Great Magician
2011	Yao Chen	My Own Swordsman
2010	Zhao Wei	14 Blades
2009	Zhang Jingchu	The Red River
2008	Yu Nan	Deadly Delicious
2007	Zhao Wei	The Longest Night in Shanghai; The Postmodern Life of My Aunt
2006	Zhou Xun	Perhaps Love
2005	Li Bingbing	Waiting Alone
2004	Zhao Wei	Warriors of Heaven and Earth
2003	Gong Li	Zhou Yu's Train
2003	Zhou Xun	Where Have All the Flowers Gone
2002	Xu Jinglei	Spring Subway
2001	Wu Yue	Chrysanthemum Tea
2000	Xu Fan	Sigh
1999	Xu Fan	Be There or Be Square
1998	Ning Jing	Red River Valley
