= Qiao's Grand Courtyard (TV series) =

Chinese television series

- International DVD cover
- Genre: Historical drama
- Written by: Zhu Qiuhai
- Directed by: Hu Mei
- Starring: Chen Jianbin; Jiang Qinqin; Ma Yili
- Theme music composer: Chinese Symphony Suite – Qiao's Grand Courtyard (乔家大院交响组曲) by Zhao Jiping
- Opening theme: Chinese Symphony Suite – Qiao's Grand Courtyard (乔家大院交响组曲) by Zhao Jiping
- Ending theme: Yuan Qing (远情) performed by Tan Jing
- Composer: Zhao Jiping
- Country of origin: China
- Original language: Mandarin
- No. of episodes: 45

Production
- Producer: Meng Fanyao
- Production location: Qiao's Compound
- Running time: 45 minutes per episode
- Production companies: Shanxi Radio TV Station; China Wencai Audio-Visual Publishing Corporation; Beijing China Visual Culture Corporation

Original release
- Network: CCTV-1

Qiao's Grand Courtyard
- Traditional Chinese: 喬家大院
- Simplified Chinese: 乔家大院
Transcriptions
Standard Mandarin
- Hanyu Pinyin: Qiáo Jiā Dà Yuàn

Qiao's Grand Courtyard is a 2006 Chinese historical drama television series. The series is set during the late Qing dynasty and chronicles the life of Shanxi financier, businessman and philanthropist Qiao Zhiyong (1818―1907), with artistic license applied. Part of the series was shot at Qiao's Compound, which was Qiao Zhiyong's ancestral home at Qi County, Shanxi (it was also the chief location for Zhang Yimou's 1991 film Raise the Red Lantern).

The series debuted on CCTV-1 on February 13, 2006 and comprises 45 episodes. It was directed by Hu Mei, known for her historical dramas Yongzheng Dynasty (1997) and The Emperor in Han Dynasty (2005).

Lead actor and actress Chen Jianbin and Jiang Qinqin won the Audience's Favorite Actor/Actress Awards at the 2006 Golden Eagle TV Art Festival for their roles in this series. The pair was married in 2006. Qiao's Grand Courtyard clinched Best Drama Series at the 1st Seoul Drama Awards.

== Plot ==
The series chronicles the life of late Qing dynasty financier and businessman Qiao Zhiyong, the most famous member of the Qiao Family from Qi County, Shanxi. The series start during the reign of the Xianfeng Emperor when Qiao Zhiyong, a young scholar, leaves for Beijing for the imperial examination. The death of his sick elder brother Qiao Zhiguang forces Zhiyong to return home without sitting for the papers. His sister-in-law, Madam Cao, compels Qiao to take on the family's business, although he is initially reluctant to do so because he prefers academic studies. But with the Qiao's family business in arrears, Qiao marries Lu Yuhan, daughter of the wealthy Shanxi merchant Lu Dake, against his will, to save his family from bankruptcy. As a result, he forgoes marrying his childhood sweetheart, maternal cousin Jiang Xueying.

Under his charge, the family business becomes profitable again. Zhiyong's wife Lu Yuhan wins his heart after a series of selfless acts for his cause. Working in tandem with a former scholar, Sun Maocai, who becomes Qiao's advisor, Qiao Zhiyong opens up tea routes from the Wuyi Mountains, the heart of Chinese tea cultivation, to the Russian Empire and becomes a renowned tea merchant.

Success with tea merchandising stirs Qiao's interest in banking. With his father-in-law's help Qiao becomes a famous financier, determined to achieve a dream of facilitating national trade by erecting banking posts (票號, an early form of banking institution) throughout China. His fame however lands him in serious trouble with the Qing imperial court and with Empress Dowager Cixi, who forces him to finance the government's campaign against the Taiping rebels.

The series ends as an elderly Qiao achieves his goal – erecting banking houses throughout China to facilitate trade (汇通天下，货通天下) – but at the expense of spending ten years under ignominious house arrest, and with the country's wealth drained after the First Sino-Japanese War of 1894-95 and the Boxer Protocol of 1901.

== Main cast ==
- Chen Jianbin as Qiao Zhiyong (乔致庸)
- Jiang Qinqin as Lu Yuhan (陆玉菡)
- Ma Yili as Jiang Xueying (江雪瑛)
- Ni Dahong as Sun Maocai (孙茂才)
- Lei Kesheng as Lu Dake (陆大可)
- Juanzi as Cao Yuezhi / First Mistress (曹月枝/大太太)
- Wang Huichun as Hu Ruanpu (胡沅浦)
- Ma Weifu as Cui Mingjiu (崔鸣九)

== Historical accuracy ==
While the series follow the chronological events of Qiao Zhiyong's life, screenwriter Zhu Xiuhai employ some artistic license in depicting Qiao's "romances". The characters Lu Yuhan, Qiao's wife, and Jiang Xueying, Qiao's cousin, are fictitious. In reality Qiao Zhiyong had six successive wives (each died after succeeding a previous wife), since he lived a long life.
