= A Fool =

- Poster
- Chinese: 一个勺子
- Directed by: Chen Jianbin
- Written by: Chen Jianbin; Hu Xuewen
- Produced by: Song Xianqiang
- Starring: Chen Jianbin; Jiang Qinqin; Wang Xuebing; Jin Shijia
- Distributed by: Ningbo Fun High Media
- Release dates: November 16, 2014 (Taipei Golden Horse Film Festival); November 20, 2015
- Running time: 95 minutes
- Country: China
- Language: Mandarin
- Box office: CN¥13.1 million

A Fool (Chinese: 一个勺子) is a 2014 Chinese adventure comedy-drama film directed by Chen Jianbin. It was released on November 20, 2015. In the film, a goatherder is followed home by a mute, simple-minded man so he and his wife have to deal with the new situation while trying to get their son's prison sentence reduced.

== Cast ==
- Chen Jianbin
- Jiang Qinqin
- Wang Xuebing
- Jin Shijia

== Reception ==
The film grossed CN¥13.1 million on its opening weekend at the Chinese box office.
