= Chrysanthemum Tea (film) =

2001 Chinese film

- Traditional Chinese: 菊花茶
- Simplified Chinese: 菊花茶
- Hanyu Pinyin: Júhuā chá
- Directed by: Jin Chen
- Written by: Chen Jianbin
- Based on: a story by Peng Jianming
- Produced by: Zhang Pimin; Sun Yi’an; Zhu Jingfeng; Lu Cunzhi; Hou Shengjun
- Starring: Chen Jianbin; Wu Yue; He Tao
- Cinematography: Huang Lian
- Edited by: Du Yuan
- Music by: An Wei
- Production companies: Xi'an Film Studio; Shanxi Hengtai Group
- Release date: 5 July 2001 (China)
- Running time: 95 minutes
- Country: China
- Language: Mandarin

Chrysanthemum Tea (Chinese: 菊花茶), also known in English under the title Love Story by Tea, is a 2001 Chinese film directed by Jin Chen, starring Chen Jianbin and Wu Yue and produced by Xi'an Film Studio and Shanxi Hengtai Group. It is based on a short story by Peng Jianming (彭见明). The film was shown at the Moscow and Karlovy Vary film festivals.

== Plot ==
Middle-aged railway worker Ma Jianxin is sent to a two-week poetry appreciation course. There, he meets a young female teacher named Li Weihua. Among the students, only Ma seems to appreciate poetry. During a lunch, the two find out that they share a taste for chrysanthemum tea. After she faints during the graduation ceremony, Ma rushes her to hospital on his back. They meet again few months later. They are in love, but Li's heart disease precludes any form of physical intimacy. They marry nevertheless.

== Cast ==
- Chen Jianbin as Ma Jianxin.
- Wu Yue as Li Weihua.
- He Tao as Gougou.
- Zhang Zhongjie.
- Qiu Yuzhen as Ma's mother.
- Huang Lian.
- Cheng Qin as Huang Xiangjiu, Gougou's girlfriend.
