= Chen Jianbin =

Chinese actor

- 陈建斌
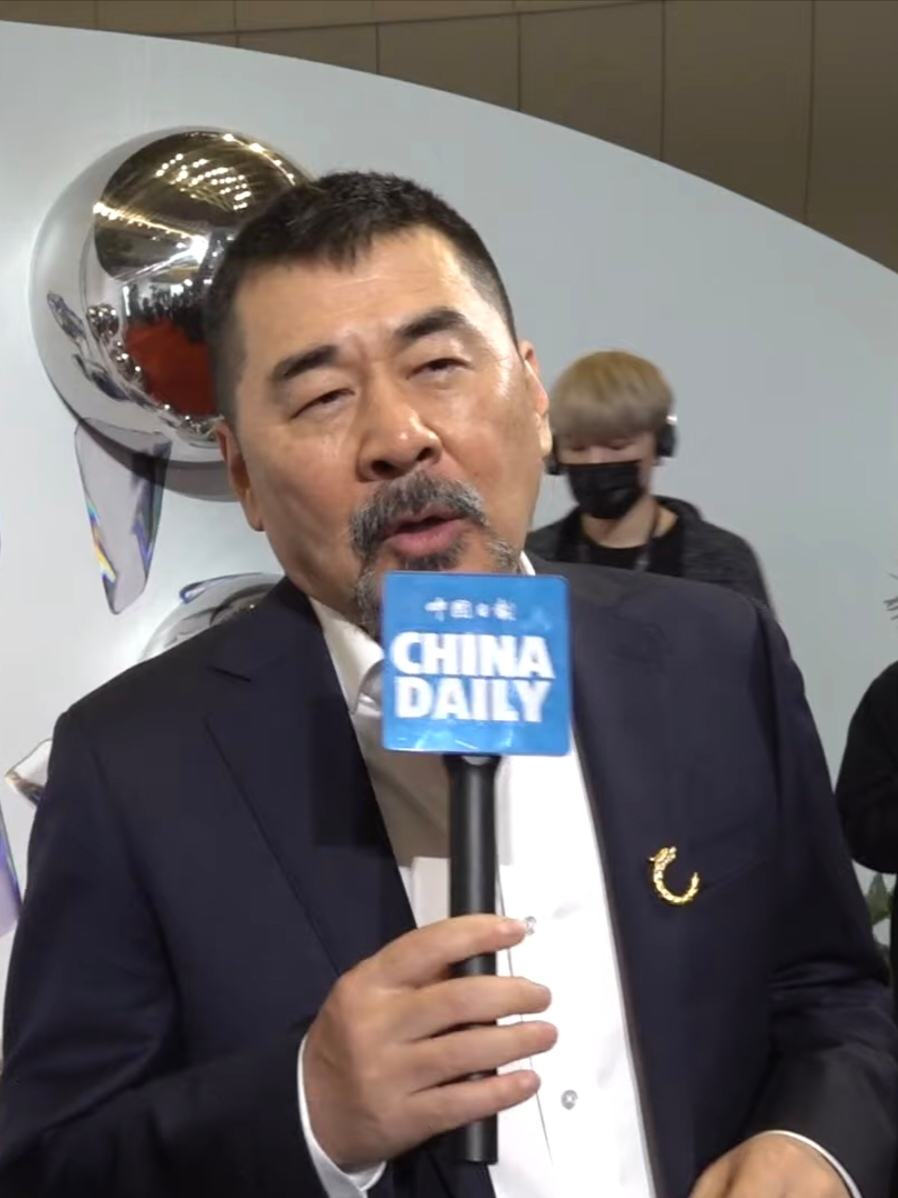
- Chen in 2024
- Born: June 27, 1970 (age 55); Ürümqi, Xinjiang, China
- Education: BA, Central Academy of Drama (1994); MA, Central Academy of Drama (1998)
- Spouse: Jiang Qinqin (m. 2006)
- Children: 2 sons (b. 2007, 2018)

Chinese name
- Traditional Chinese: 陳建斌
- Simplified Chinese: 陈建斌
Transcriptions

Chen Jianbin (born June 27, 1970) is a Chinese actor and director. He is best known for his roles in television series, including Cao Cao in Three Kingdoms (2010) and the Emperor Yongzheng in Empresses in the Palace (2011). In 2014, he broke a Golden Horse Awards record by winning the best actor, best supporting actor, and best new director all on the same night.

Chen married his Qiao's Grand Courtyard co-star Jiang Qinqin in 2006.

== Filmography ==
=== Film ===
Year	English title	Chinese title	Role	Notes
1998	Love in the Internet Epoc	网络时代的爱情	Lu Lin	
2001	A Fatal Attack	致命的一击		
2001	Chrysanthemum Tea	菊花茶	Ma Jianxin	
2001	One Hundred	100个	Zhu Laosi	
2002	Chicken Poets	像鸡毛一样飞	Ouyang Yunfei	
2003	Leaving Me, Loving You	大城小事	Ma Shifa	
2003		旧夫新婚	Da Li	
2003	Jade Goddess of Mercy	玉观音	Tiejun	
2004	Sunny Cour Tyard	阳光天井	Xiao Chang	
2007	Suspicion	猜猜猜	Ma Wen	
2008	24 City	二十四城记		Cameo
2010	Confucius	孔子	Ji Huanzi	
2010	Driverless	无人驾驶	Wang Yao	
2011	Dragon	武俠	policeman	cameo
2011	People Mountain People Sea	人山人海	Lao'er	
2014	Paradise in Service	军中乐园	Lao Zhang	
2014	A Fool	一个勺子	La Tiaozi	Director and co-writer
2014	When a Peking Family Meets Aupair	洋妞到我家	Su Youzhi	
2018	A Cool Fish	无名之辈	Ma Xianyong	
2021	The Eleventh Chapter	第十一回	Ma Fuli	Director and co-writer

=== Television series ===
Year	English title	Chinese title	Role	Notes
1993		梅花三弄	Guard	Bit part
1997		京港爱情线		
1997		凤求凰	Dou Jia	
1999	My Dear Homeland	我亲爱的祖国	Fang Xuetong	
2000	Eternal Lover	永恒恋人		
2000		关怀		
2001	Wishful Years	女人别哭	Zhou Zijian	
2002	Decade of Marriage	结婚十年	Cheng Zhang	
2003	Loved Me Release Me	穿越激情	Lu Ye	
2003		走进八里堡	Li Junsheng	
2003		铁血豪情	Zhou Xiao	
2004	Romantic Affairs	浪漫的事	Su Xiaocong	
2004		最后诊断	Ma Peide	
2004	Police Errand	刑警使命	Yan Yiding	
2005		决不饶恕	Ding Wu	
2005		从爱情开始	Zhou Mingyuan	
2005	Marry in Chinese Fashion	中国式结婚		Cameo
2006	Qiao's Grand Courtyard	乔家大院	Qiao Zhiyong	
2006	Touch	接触	Zhang Yuexin	
2006		红墨坊	Jin Kaiwen	
2007	The Brothers	亲兄热弟	Yu Dashui	
2007		光荣岁月	Fan Zhihao	
2007	Shoot Again	睁开你的眼睛	Luo Jianping	
2008	Love Times	有爱的日子		
2008		天下兄弟	Li Shizhang	
2008		震撼世界的七日	Zhou Beichuan	
2010	Three Kingdoms	三国	Cao Cao	Main Cast
2011		五星红旗迎风飘扬	Qian Xuesen	
2011	China 1921	中国1921	Wu Bingxiang	
2011	Empresses in the Palace	后宫甄嬛传	Yongzheng Emperor	
2011	Epoch Making	开天辟地	Yi Dali	
2012	You Are My Lover	你是我爱人	Lan Haiqiang	
2012	The Girls	女人帮·妞儿		Cameo
2014	Brothers	兄弟，兄弟	Meng Tianyun	
2015	Zhao Kuangyin	大宋传奇之赵匡胤	Zhao Kuangyin	
2016	The Identity of Father	父亲的身份	Yu Beiping	
2016	Chinese Style Relationship	中国式关系	Ma Guoliang	
2019	The Longest Day in Chang'an	长安十二时辰	Master Ge (voice)	
2020	Trident	三叉戟	Cui Tiejun	
2020	Love Me Don't Think Too Much	爱我就别想太多	Li Honghai	

== Accolades ==
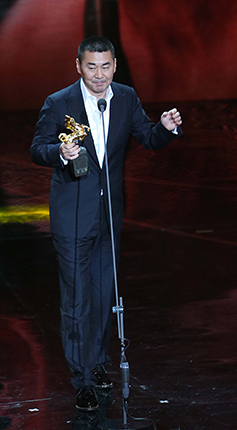
Chen at the 51st Golden Horse Awards

Year	English title	Award Category	Role	Notes
2000	4th China Golden Lion Award	Best Actor	—N/a	
2001	8th Beijing College Student Film Festival	Favorite Actor	Chrysanthemum Tea	
2004	24th Flying Apsaras Awards	Outstanding Actor	Decade of Marriage	
2004	22nd China TV Golden Eagle Award	Best Actor	Decade of Marriage	
2006	23rd China TV Golden Eagle Award	Best Actor	Qiao's Grand Courtyard	
2011	13th Golden Phoenix Awards	Society Award	Confucius	
2011	6th Seoul International Drama Awards	Best Actor	Three Kingdoms	
2011	1st Asia Rainbow TV Awards	Best Actor	Three Kingdoms	
2012	Huading Awards	Best Actor (TV)	Three Kingdoms	
2012	4th China Image Film Festival	Most Popular Actor	People Mountain People Sea	
2014	51st Golden Horse Film Festival and Awards	Best Actor	A Fool	
2014	51st Golden Horse Film Festival and Awards	Best New Director	A Fool	
2014	51st Golden Horse Film Festival and Awards	Best Supporting Actor	Paradise in Service	
2015	15th Chinese Film Media Awards	Best Supporting Actor	Paradise in Service	
2015	30th Golden Rooster Awards	Best Directorial Debut	A Fool	
2016	20th Huading Awards	Best Actor	A Fool	
2016	1st Gold Aries Award Macau International Film Festival	Film Contribution Award	A Fool	
2016	23rd Beijing College Student Film Festival	Jury Award	A Fool	
2017	16th Golden Phoenix Awards	Society Award	A Fool	
2018	10th Macau International Movie Festival	Best Actor	A Cool Fish	
2019	9th Beijing International Film Festival	Best Screenplay	The Eleventh Chapter	
2021	13th China Film Director's Guild Awards	Best Actor	The Eleventh Chapter	
