= Hu Mei (director) =

Chinese film director (born 1958)

- 胡玫
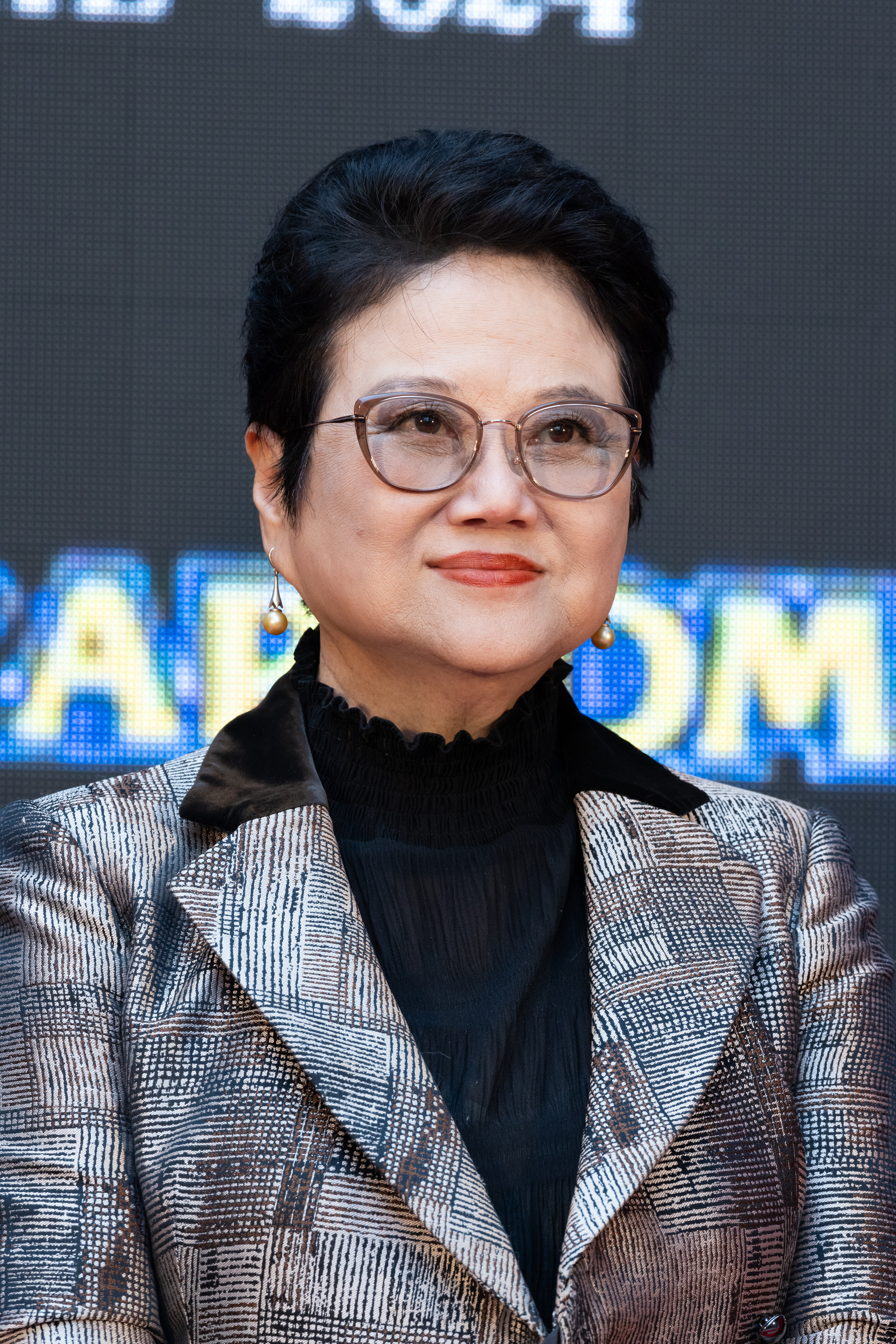
- Hu Mei at the 37th Tokyo International Film Festival in 2024
- Born: 2 September 1958 (age 68); Beijing, China
- Occupations: Film director, television director, producer
- Years active: 1980s–present

Hu Mei (born 2 September 1958) is a Chinese film director, television director and producer.

== Education ==
Hu was an actress in the Modern Drama Troupe of the General Political Division of the People's Liberation Army. Her father was a conductor and mother was a singer. Hu was trained to play the piano from a very young age. When the Beijing Film Academy reopened in 1978, she enrolled for the directing class under her father's encouragement. Usually classed as a Fifth Generation director, since she graduated from the Directors' class of the 1982 Beijing Film Academy cohort, she is a classmate of famous Fifth Generation directors such as Chen Kaige and Tian Zhuangzhuang.

Hu nearly went to France to pursue a PhD in film, but abandoned the idea at the last minute.

== Work ==
After graduation, she was assigned to the Bayi Film Studio. In 1984, she made her first film Women's Chamber (女儿楼, Nü'er Lou). Two years later, her film Times Away from War (远离战争的年代, Yuanli Zhanzheng de Niandai), which is said to be the first Chinese psychological film, won her a number of international awards.

She spent nearly ten years shooting television commercials. She also started directing more commercialized films. Yongzheng Dynasty was her first major successful television series. Since then, she is considered a top-tiered television series director in China.

The historical television series Yongzheng Dynasty, which she directed in 1997, received critical acclaim in mainland China. She has since directed a number of television series, including The Emperor in Han Dynasty (2005), Qiao's Grand Courtyard (2006), and Cao Cao (2014).

On the Other Side of the Bridge (Am anderen Ende der Brücke), a love story between an Austrian woman and a Chinese trainee police officer, meeting in Vienna in 1931, was produced in collaboration with ORF in 2002.

Her film Confucius, starring Chow Yun-fat as the eponymous character, was released in Beijing on 14 January 2010. In 2019, Hu won the Best Director award for Enter The Forbidden City at the Chinese American Film Festival in Los Angeles.

Hu Mei was initially selected to direct a television series adaptation of Cao Xueqin's 18th-century seminal novel, A Dream of the Red Chamber, but clashed with the producers over the cast selection, and was replaced by Li Shaohong in October 2007. Her own version of The Dream of the Red Chamber officially started production in 2017 and was released in China in 2024. Hu Mei wanted to add a modern perspectives and regenerate attention to the classic novel.
