= Ren Suxi =

Chinese actress

- 任素汐
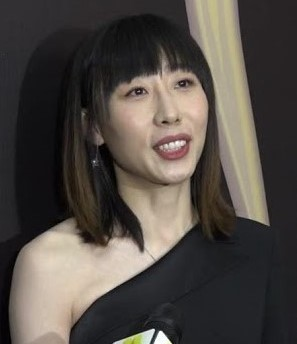
- Born: June 1, 1988 (age 38); Laizhou, Shandong, China
- Education: Central Academy of Drama
- Occupation: Actress
- Years active: 2006–present
- Height: 172 cm (5 ft 8 in)
- Spouse: Li Yang (m. 2014; div. 2016)

Ren Suxi (Chinese: 任素汐; pinyin: Rén Sùxī; born 1 June 1988) is a Chinese actress. She made her acting debut in the drama film The Eighth Clay Man (2006), and has since gone on to appear in numerous movie and film titles such as Mr. Donkey (2016) and Looking Up (2019).

== Early life ==
Ren was born 1 June 1988 in Laizhou. Her mother is a kindergarten teacher, who was interested in literature and art. Her sister was originally a dancer at the Yantai Song and Dance Theater, and later a student at the Beijing Film Academy.

She studied at No#5 Middle School and High School in Laizhou. At the age of 17, she was admitted to the Directing Department of the Central Academy of Drama. In 2006, during her sophomore year at the Central Academy of Drama, Ren encountered stage play for the first time by chance. Although she was from the directing department, she was assisted by her seniors into the drama stage. In the same year, she participated in the drama contest of the Central Academy of Drama, and her work The Beginning of Man won the best stage, best lighting, and best actor awards.

== Career ==
In 2006, she made her acting debut in the film The Eighth Clay Man. In 2011, she starred in the stage drama Three People Can't Walk, which was directed by Taiwanese director Hugh Lee, with multiple roles for each person in the production.

In 2012, she starred in the stage drama The Donkey Gets Water, which was written and directed by Liu Lu and Zhou Shen. In October 2014, she joined Dong Bo and Wang Ge in the stage drama Reminiscences in the Northeast, and played the heroine Gao Huan. In 2016, Ren starred in the movie Mr. Donkey, which was the film adaption of the stage drama The Donkey Gets Water. For her performance in the movie, she won the Tencent Video Star Award for the New Actress of the Year and the Best New Actress Award at the Shanghai Film Critics Awards.

Ren starred in the 2019 movie Almost a Comedy, for which she was for nominated for the 33rd Golden Rooster Award for Best Actress. On the same year, she was awarded the Best Actress award at the 7th WenRong TV Award for her performance in the movie My People, My Country. For her performance in Almost a Comedy, she won the Best Actress awards at the 15th Changchun Film Festival and 27th Huading Awards.

On 2021, she starred in the movie Miss Mom, where she played a role of a young woman named Wang Zhao. On the same year, she starred in the romantic comedy film Tempting Hearts, which was directed by Gordon Chan. Ren starred in the crime suspense film The Murder in Kairotei (2022), which is a live adaption of the mystery novel written by Japanese author Keigo Higashino.

== Personal life ==
Ren was married to Li Yang in 2014, before divorcing in 2016.

== Filmography ==
=== Films ===
- The Eighth Clay Man (2006)
- Mr. Donkey (2016) - Zhang Yiman
- Absurd Accident (2017) - Miss Gu
- A Cool Fish (2018) - Ma Jiaqi
- Looking Up (2019) - Xin Yu
- My People, My Country (2019) - Fang Min
- Almost a Comedy (2019) - Momo
- A Road to Spring (2020) - Su Fang
- Miss Mom (2021) - Wang Zhao
- Tempting Hearts (2021) - Chen Ran
- The Murder in Kairotei (2022) - Zhou Yang
- Everything is Unknown (2022)

=== Television ===
- Day Day Up (2008)
- PhantaCity (2018)
- Crossroad Bistro (2021)
- Remembrance of Things Past (2021)
- Dear Child (2022)
- The Long Season (2023)
