= Sun Xiaoguo =

Chinese serial child rapist and gang leader (1977–2020)

- 孙小果
- Born: Chen Guo (陈果); 27 October 1977; Kunming, Yunnan, People's Republic of China
- Died: 20 February 2020 (aged 42); Kunming, Yunnan, People's Republic of China
- Cause of death: Executed by lethal injection
- Other name: Li Linchen (李林宸)
- Known for: Leader of Kunming gang
- Height: 188 cm (6 ft 2 in)
- Criminal charges: Rape, violent assault, sexual assault, organized crime
- Criminal penalty: Death and deprivation of political rights for life
- Criminal status: Executed

Sun Xiaoguo (born Chen Guo and also known by his alias Li Linchen; 27 October 1977 – 20 February 2020), was a serial child rapist and gang leader from Kunming, China. He was known for the brutality of his crimes as well as his evasion of justice. Sun was originally sentenced to death in 1998, but his sentence was commuted to 20 years imprisonment due to corruption within the court system. He was released in 2010 after only serving for 12 years and 5 months and continued participating in organised crime under the alias "Li Linchen". During a crackdown on organised crime in 2018, Sun was arrested on charges of leading an organised criminal gang. When Sun's name appeared in the list of criminal gangs, his case attracted the attention of the media, as he had been sentenced to death 21 years prior. Sun's brutal methods stunned the investigating staff, and the phrase "[Deng] Xiaoping rules the day, [Sun] Xiaoguo rules the night" spread in Kunming. Sun was executed on 20 February 2020 by lethal injection.

== Early life ==
Sun was born in Kunming, Yunnan on 27 October 1977. In December 1992, before Sun reached the age of enlistment, his stepfather Li Qiaozhong took advantage of his position as deputy director of the Police Department of the Yunnan Border Guard Command to change Sun's date of birth to 27 October 1975. Subsequently, Sun served in various law enforcement positions.

== Criminal activities ==
=== October 1994 – April 1996 ===
On 16 October 1994, Sun, who was a student of the Public Security Border Defense Forces Kunming Command School, and two other youths, wandered by a car. They dragged two women into their car on the South Ring Road, Kunming, and drove to Chenggong district, where they gang-raped them.

On 28 October 1994, Sun Xiaoguo was detained, and on 4 April 1995, his arrest was approved. During this time, Sun's age was corrected from 19 back to 17. In an attempt to get Sun released, his mother Sun Heyu provided a false certificate of illness. On 20 December 1995, the People's Court of Panlong District sentenced Sun to three years in prison. In April 1996, the Kunming Intermediate People's Court dismissed his appeal.

=== 1997 ===
On 27 March 1997, Sun was released from prison because of medical procedures. According to the Chinese Yearbook of Law, within eight months of his release, Sun and his gang committed at least eight crimes, including rape, intentional injury, forced obscenity and insult to women, and provocation.

Between April and June 1997, Sun raped several underage girls in the Chayuan Lou Hotel. The victims included a 15-year-old girl, a 17-year-old female student and her friend, another 15-year-old female student and a 13-year-old female student.

On 17 June 1997, Sun brought a female student under the age of 14 to the Xingzhao Hotel in Kunming and attempted to rape her. Due to her resistance, Sun did not succeed. He then instructed his subordinates to take the girl downstairs and beat her to the point of being "unrecognisable".

On 13 July 1997, Sun's gang had a dispute with another gang in the Bopei Entertainment City in Kunming. Sun and his associates committed vehicular assault and assaulted rival gang members. After the police investigated the gang dispute, they found that Sun was actually a criminal who was currently supposed to be in prison. The police called Sun's mother, who claimed that Sun had returned to his grandmother's house in Sichuan and was not involved in the dispute.

On 22 October 1997, Sun assaulted a restaurant patron who did not obey his commands.

On 7 November 1997, Sun kidnapped two 17-year-old girls and took them to Kunming's Yueguangcheng Night Club, where he violently assaulted one of them. The next day, Sun moved the girls to a pub in Haosheng Entertainment City in Kunming and further assaulted them. In the end, one girl suffered severe injuries, multiple extensive soft tissue contusions throughout the body, right frontal lobe contusion and laceration, 2–8 rib fractures in the left thoracic rib, limited lower limb movement and peripheral nerve damage. She also suffered retrograde amnesia, and fell into a coma.

=== 1998 trial and aftermath ===
On 18 February 1998, the Kunming Intermediate People's Court tried and sentenced Sun to death and deprivated his political rights for life for rape; 15 years imprisonment for assaulting women; 7 years imprisonment for intentional harm; 3 years imprisonment for provocation and nuisance; 2 years, 4 months and 12 days of imprisonment for other offences; the total punishment was death and deprivation of political rights for life.

On 9 March 1999, the Yunnan Higher People's Court reprieved his death sentence for two years. On 27 September 2007, the Yunnan Higher People's Court retrialed Sun and sentenced him to 20 years imprisonment.

In 2008, while Sun was detained in the Yunnan No.1 Prison, his mother, Sun Heyu, and stepfather, Li Qiaozhong, asked Yunnan justice system officials to change Sun's inmate assessment score to "active improver", and falsely credited several inventions to Sun. These falsifications counted towards the reduction of Sun's sentence.

In January 2009, Sun was transferred to the Yunnan No.2 Prison. Due to his supposed inventions and good behaviour, he was eligible for a commutation of two years and eight months.

=== 2010 release ===
On 11 April 2010, Sun was released after several commutations which resulted in an actual sentence of 12 years and 5 months. After being released from prison, he changed his name to Li Linchen, became a shareholder in several businesses and operated many bars in Kunming.

On the evening of 21 July 2018, Sun beat up a person known only as "Wang" in Guandu District, Kunming, causing them to be seriously injured and several other people to suffer various degrees of injury. After the incident, the Guandu Branch of the Kunming Public Security Bureau opened an investigation on 30 July 2018.

=== Intervention by the Central Anti-Organized Crime Supervision Team and arrest ===
On 3 January 2019, Sun's case was transferred to the Guandu District People's Court and it was discovered that Sun was a criminal who had been sentenced to death in 1998. This breach of justice was conveyed to the Yunnan Provincial Party Committee. At this point, the case began to attract significant media attention.

On 18 March 2019, the Guandu District People's Court arrested Sun and the police investigated Sun's suspected crimes after his release from prison in April 2010, and found that Sun and his gang members had gathered to fight, operated a casino, tried to cause trouble, and falsely imprisoned others, as well as other suspected crimes.

In April 2019, after the 20th Central Anti-crime and Evil Supervision Team entered Yunnan, the case was designated as a key case for supervision. In May, the Office of the Leading Group of the National Anti-Crime Special Campaign also listed the case.

On 4 June 2019, a team consisting of the National Supervisory Commission and the Central Commission for Discipline Inspection, led by the Central Political and Legal Affairs Commission, the Office of the Leading Group of the National Anti-Crime Special Commission, the Supreme People's Court, the Supreme People's Procuratorate, the Ministry of Public Security and the Ministry of Justice urged relevant departments of Yunnan Province to handle Sun's case.

On 26 July 2019, the Yunnan Higher People's Court declared the original 2007 trial decision a mistrial and announced a retrial. Sun remained detained when he was re-tried.

=== 2019 re-trial and execution ===
On 14 October 2019, the Yunnan Higher People's Court re-tried Sun's 1998 rape and assault offences. In addition, the Yunnan Province People's Procuratorate filed a public prosecution for Sun's suspected participation in gang organisations after his 2010 release. Nineteen public officials and affiliates suspected of crimes relating to Sun's case were summoned to court for review and prosecution.

On 6 and 7 November 2019, the Yuxi Intermediate People's Court tried 13 people, including Sun, on suspicion of leadership and participation in gang organisations. The People's Court of Jiangchuan District of Yuxi City also tried Li Shuang and other 22 protectors involved in Sun's case of opening a casino, provoking trouble, assault, false imprisonment, fraud and intentional harm.

On 8 November 2019, the Yuxi Intermediate People's Court sentenced Sun to 25 years imprisonment, deprivation of political rights for 5 years, and confiscation of all personal property for organising and leading a gang, setting up casinos, causing trouble, false imprisonment, intentional harm, hindering testimony, and bribery. Sun's original 1998 rape trial was scheduled to occur later. On 17 December, the Yunnan High People's Court dismissed the appeal of 4 people including Sun.

On 14 December 2019, the Yunnan Provincial Commission for Discipline Inspection investigated five officials involved in Sun's case. They were punished with warnings within the party.

On 15 December 2019, multiple courts issued sentences on 19 criminal cases involving government officials and important related persons in Sun's case. Among them, Sun's stepfather Li Qiaozhong was sentenced to 19 years imprisonment, and Sun's mother Sun He was sentenced to 20 years imprisonment.

On 23 December 2019, the Yunnan Higher People's Court decided to uphold the first ruling of the Kunming Intermediate People's Court in February 1998, in which Sun was sentenced to death. On 12 February 2020, the Supreme People's Court approved the death sentence.

On 20 February 2020, according to the Supreme People's Court's execution warrant, Sun was executed by the Kunming Intermediate People's Court through lethal injection.

== Rulings on Sun's associates ==
Sentencing of Sun's protectors
Family and friends
Protector name	Relationship	Ruling
Li Qiaozhong	Stepfather	19 yrs.
Sun Queyu	Mother	20 yrs.
Wang Debin	Head of Wangshi Group, Sichuan Friend of Sun	7 yrs.
Sun Fengyun	Head of Kunming Yuxiangsui Jewelries Friend of Sun	11 yrs.
Police
Protector name	Title	Ruling
Li Jin	Deputy head of Guandu District and head of the Guandu public security branch.	10 yrs.
Zheng Yunjin	Head of the Juhua Police Station in Guandu	3 yrs. 9 m.
Yang Jingsong	Deputy captain of the Criminal Investigation Corps of Yunnan Provincial Public Security Department	12 yrs.
Court & judges
Protector name	Title	Ruling
Liamg Zi'an	Member of the Trial Committee of Yunnan Higher People's Court	12 yrs.
Tian Bo	Member of the Trial Committee of Yunnan Higher People's Court	10 yrs.
Chen Chao	Former Vice President of the Second Criminal Division of the Kunming Intermediate People's Court	8 yrs.
Judicial officials
Protector name	Title	Ruling
Luo Zhengyun	Former inspector of the Yunnan Provincial Department of Justice	10 yrs. 6 m.
Liu Siyuan	Deputy inspector of the Yunnan Provincial Prison Administration	6 yrs.
Zhu Yu	Deputy director of the Yunnan Provincial Prison Administration	9 yrs. 6 m.
Wang Kaigui	Department head of the Department of Safety and Environmental Protection in the Yunnan Provincial Prison Administration	5 yrs. 6 m.
Bei Huyue	Yunnan No.1 Prison inspector	3 yrs.
Zhou Zhongping	Yunnan No.1 Prison commanding center prison officer	3 yrs.
Wen Zhishen	19th Supervision District supervisor of Yunnan No.2 Prison	3 yrs. 6 m.
Shen Kun	Yunnan No.2 Prison hospital prison officer	3 yrs. 6 m.
Yang Song	Deputy Political Commissar of Yunnan Guandu Prison	2 yrs.

Some defendants were also fined separately and the stolen money was confiscated.
