= Ziguangge =

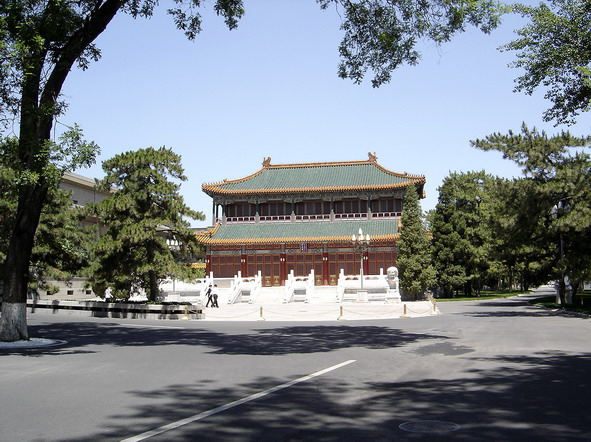
- Exterior view of the Ziguangge, May 2005
- Interactive map of the Ziguangge area

General information
- Status: In usage
- Location: Xicheng District, Beijing
- Years built: Zhengde era, Ming

Technical details
- Material: Wood

Chinese name
- Traditional Chinese: 紫光閣
- Simplified Chinese: 紫光阁
- Literal meaning: "Hall of Purple Splendor"
Transcriptions
Standard Mandarin
- Hanyu Pinyin: Zǐguāng Gé
- Wade–Giles: Tzŭ³-kuang¹-ko²
- IPA: [tsì.kwáŋ.kɤ̌]

Ziguangge (Chinese: 紫光阁; lit. "Hall of Purple Splendor") or Ziguang Hall is a pavilion located on the western side of Zhongnanhai in Beijing. The building originally served as a place where the Ming and Qing emperors watched mounted archery and examined candidates of the military imperial examination. During the Qianlong era it was rebuilt twice and transformed into a building for housing portraits of military commanders and displaying their meritorious deeds. In 1873 it was converted into a reception venue for foreign guests, a function it retains to this day.

== History ==
=== Construction and usage ===
The building was erected during the Zhengde era of the Ming dynasty, initially as a platform from which the Emperor Wuzong of Ming reviewed troops. The present structure preserves the scale of the Qianlong era of the Qing dynasty; its name evokes the auspicious imagery of "purple vapour arriving from the east, roseate light paying homage to the origin" (紫气东来, 霞光朝元). Originally an imperial reviewing platform, the platform was later demolished and a pavilion built in its place, which also became the site where the emperor held the palace examination for military jinshi and reviewed the guard ministers. After its expansion in 1760, portraits of two hundred meritorious officials were painted within the pavilion and military battle maps were hung on its walls, making it a hall for military display. Every year on the fifteenth day of the first lunar month, the emperor held a banquet for meritorious officials here, feasting his assembled ministers. In 1873, the Tongzhi Emperor formally received foreign envoys stationed in Beijing here for the first time, including the ministers of six countries: Japan, Russia, the United States, France, the Netherlands, and Britain.

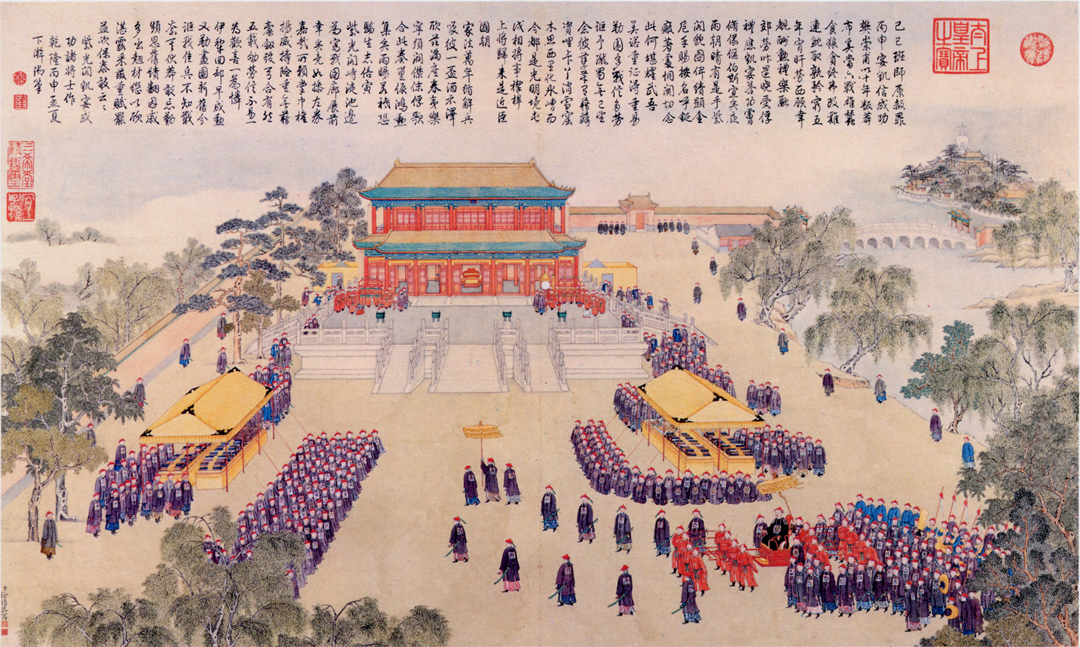
After the victory pacifying Jinchuan, the Qianlong Emperor holds a triumphal banquet for the successful officers and soldiers at the Ziguangge

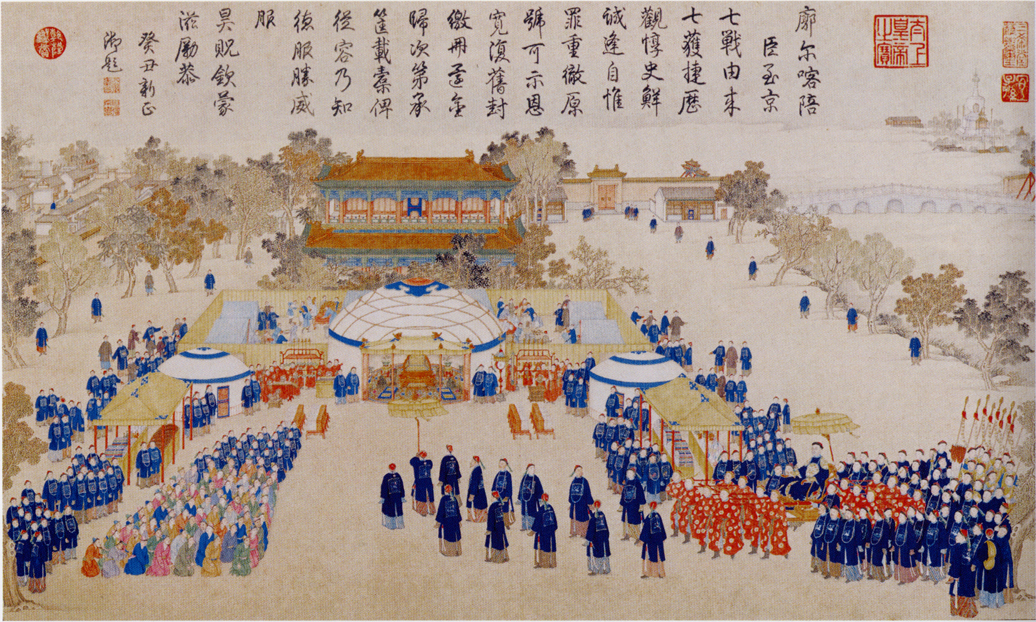
After the campaign pacifying the Dzungars, the Qianlong Emperor holds a triumphal banquet for the officers and soldiers in front of the Ziguangge

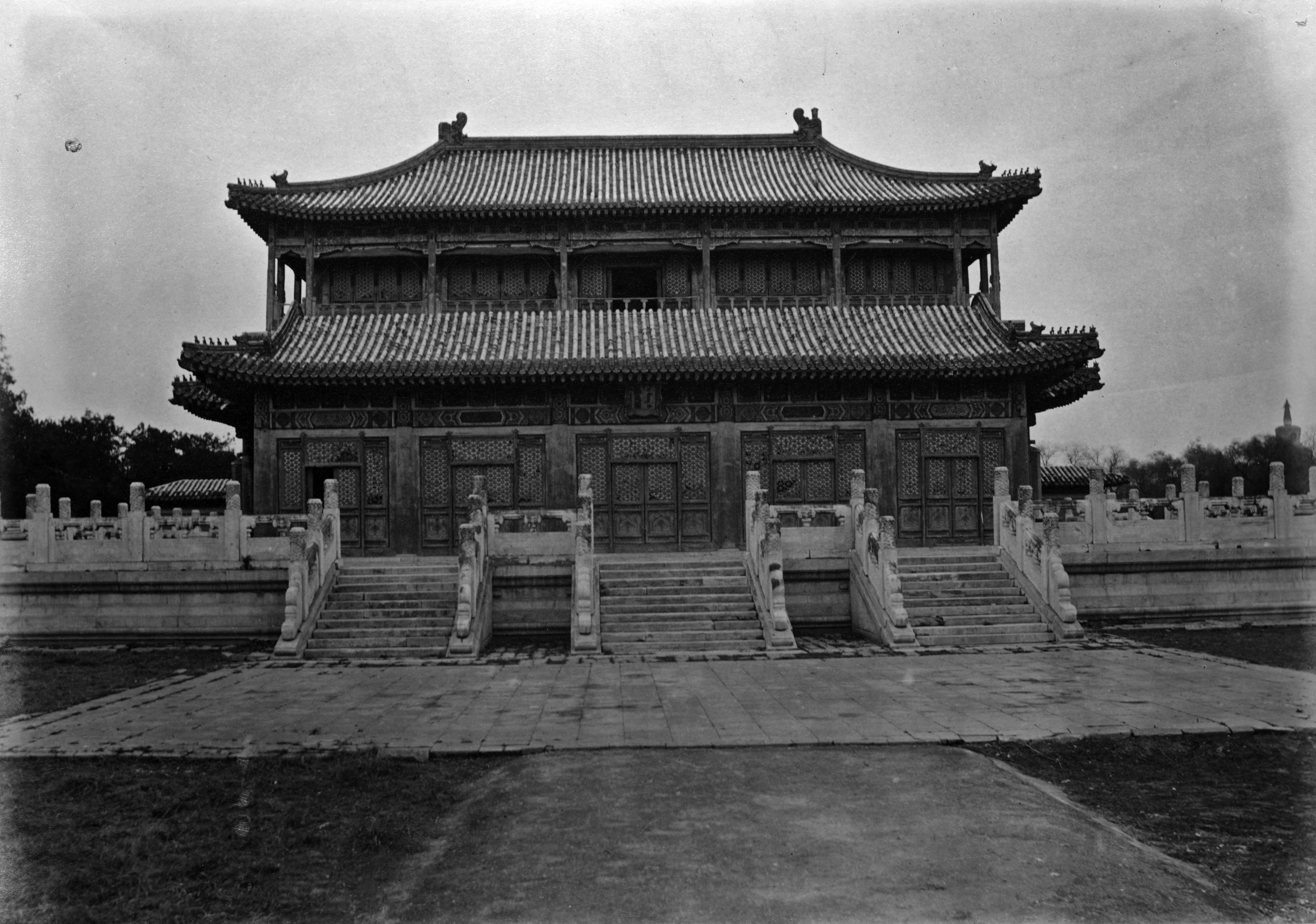
Exterior view of the Ziguangge, c. 1879

=== Meritorious Officers Paintings of Ziguangge ===
In 1755, after the Qing government won its victory against the Dzungar and Muslim (Hui) regions of the Western Regions, the Qianlong Emperor resolved to lavishly reward his meritorious officials: "The Emperor, esteeming the achievements of the ministers who had served in the campaign, accordingly refurbished this pavilion anew, and had one hundred meritorious officials portrayed within it, beginning with the Grand Secretary, Duke Zhongyong ('Loyal and Brave') Fuheng, and the General Who Pacifies the Frontier, first-class Duke Wuyi Mouyong ('Martial, Resolute, Scheming and Valiant') and Minister of Revenue Zhaohui. For fifty of them the Emperor personally composed eulogies; for the rest he commanded his scholar-officials to draft them."

In 1776, when the Qing army returned in triumph from pacifying Greater and Lesser Jinchuan, Qianlong again issued an edict: "It is once more commanded that one hundred officials, headed by the Grand Secretary and General Who Pacifies the West, first-class Duke Chengmou Yingyong ('Sincere in Counsel and Heroically Brave') Agui, and the Right Deputy General Who Pacifies the Frontier, first-class Duke Guoyi Jiyong ('Resolute and Continuously Brave') and Minister of Revenue Fengsheng'e—be arrayed as fifty earlier and fifty later meritorious officials. The Emperor personally composed the eulogies for the first fifty meritorious officials, and commanded his scholar-officials to draft the eulogies for the latter fifty, exactly as had been done in the case of the pacification of Ili and the Muslim regions." Moreover, he ordered that from then on portraits be made not only of the officials who had rendered merit in war, but that these portraits also be hung in the Ziguangge as a mark of distinction. Thereafter, he personally inscribed eulogies for the fifty highest-ranked meritorious officers. In the later years of the Qianlong reign, a further 50 Portraits of Meritorious Officials in the Pacification of Taiwan and 30 Portraits of Meritorious Officials in the Pacification of Gorkha were added. Over the course of Qianlong's reign, the portraits of meritorious officials successively painted and hung within the Ziguangge numbered as many as 280 in total.

Meritorious Officers Paintings of Ziguangge

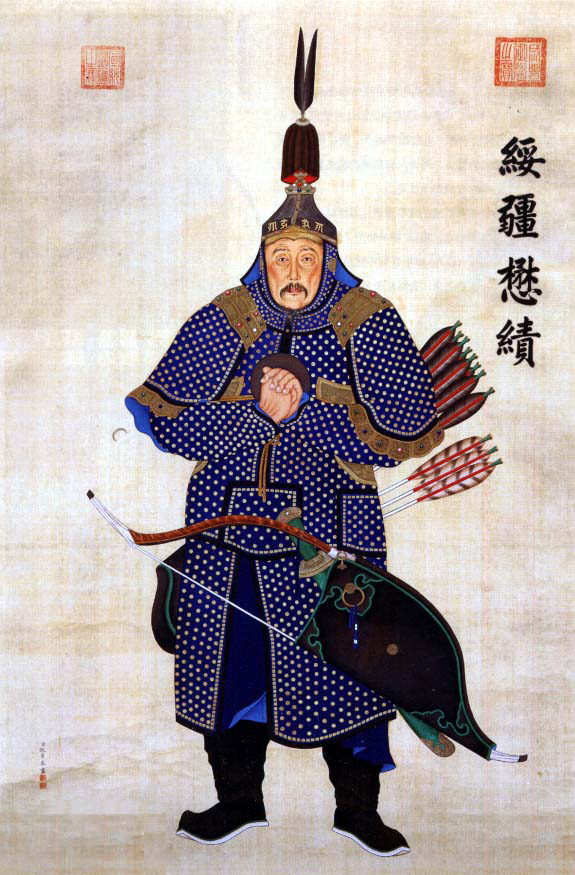
Zhaohui

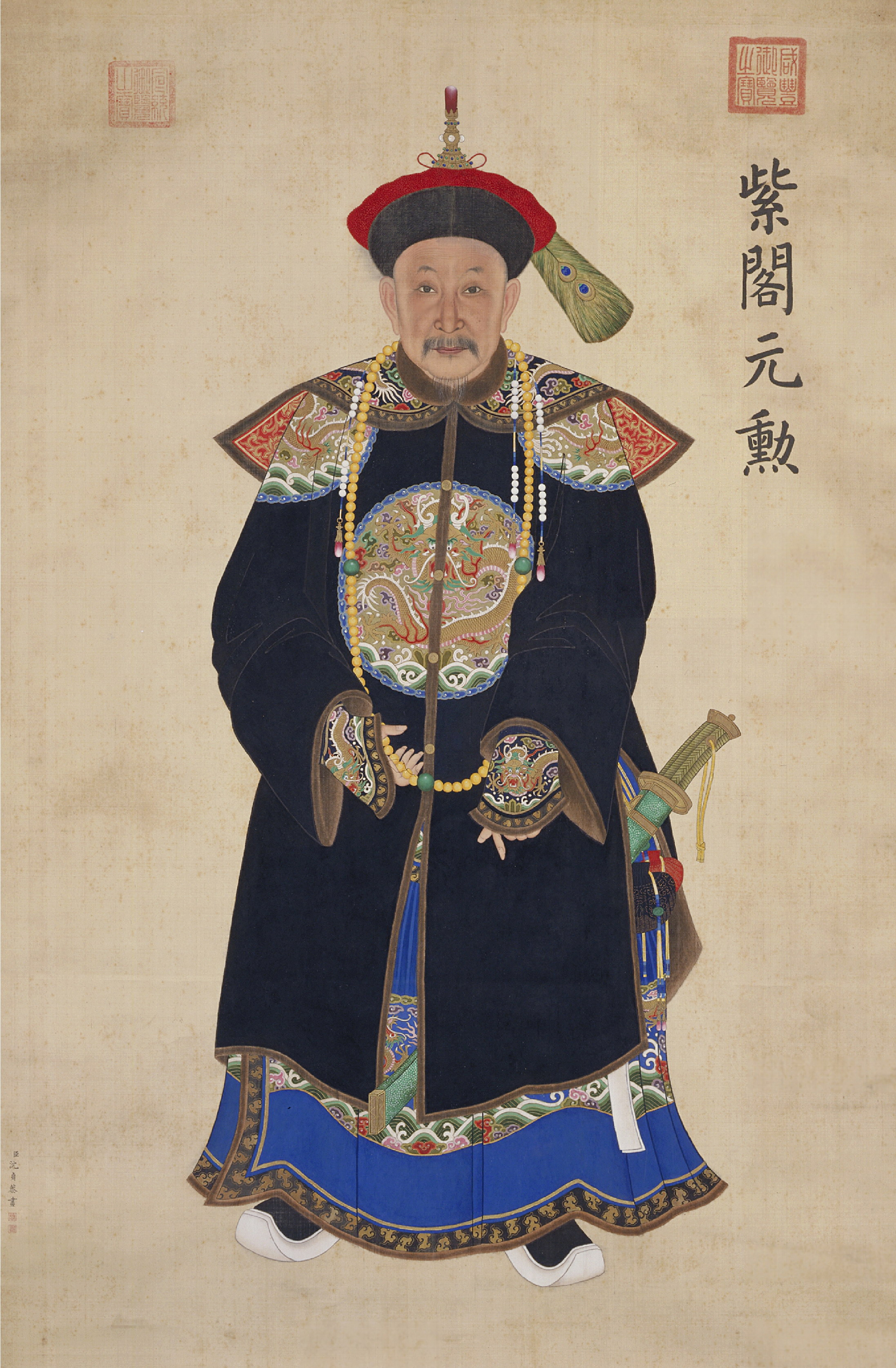
Agui

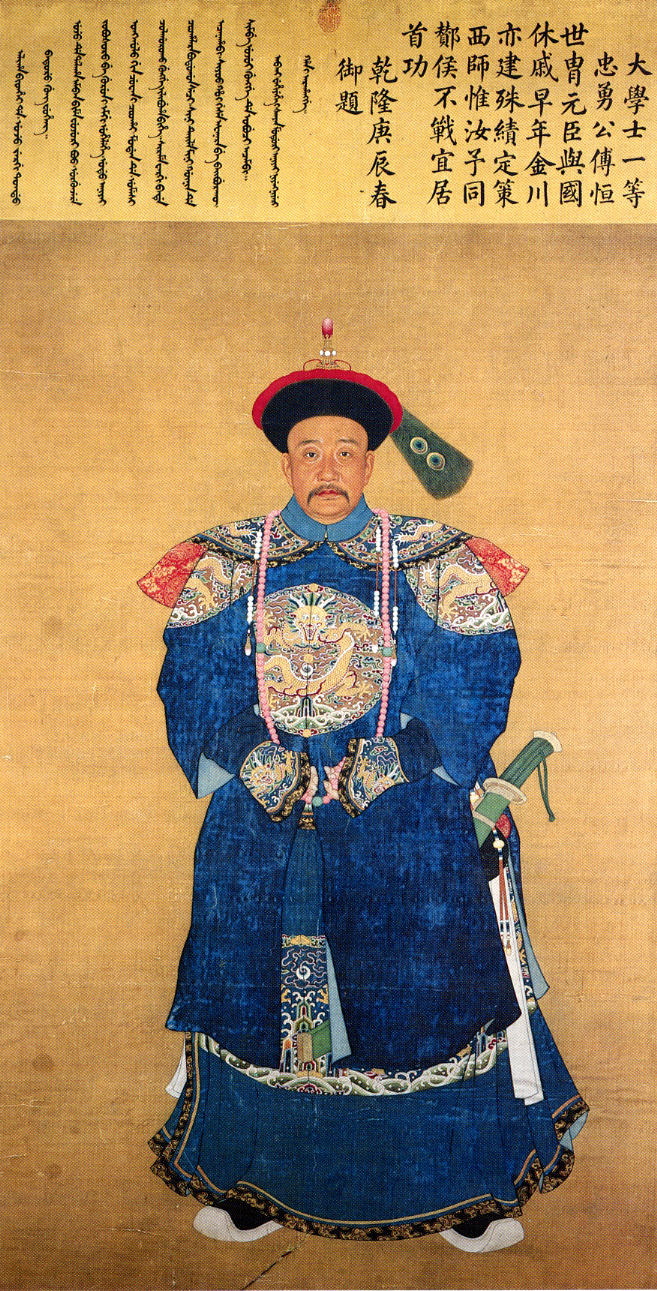
Fuheng

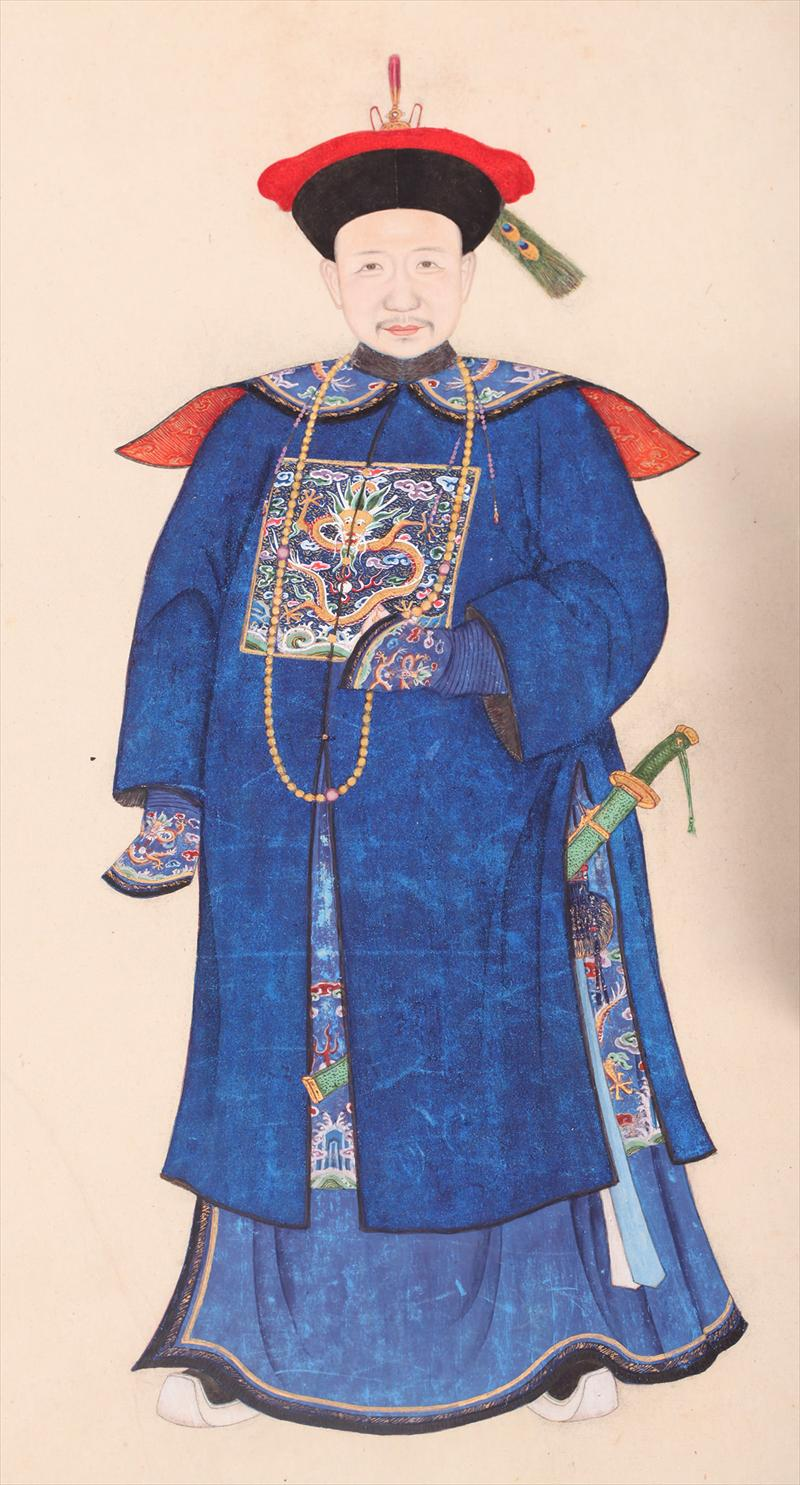
Heshen

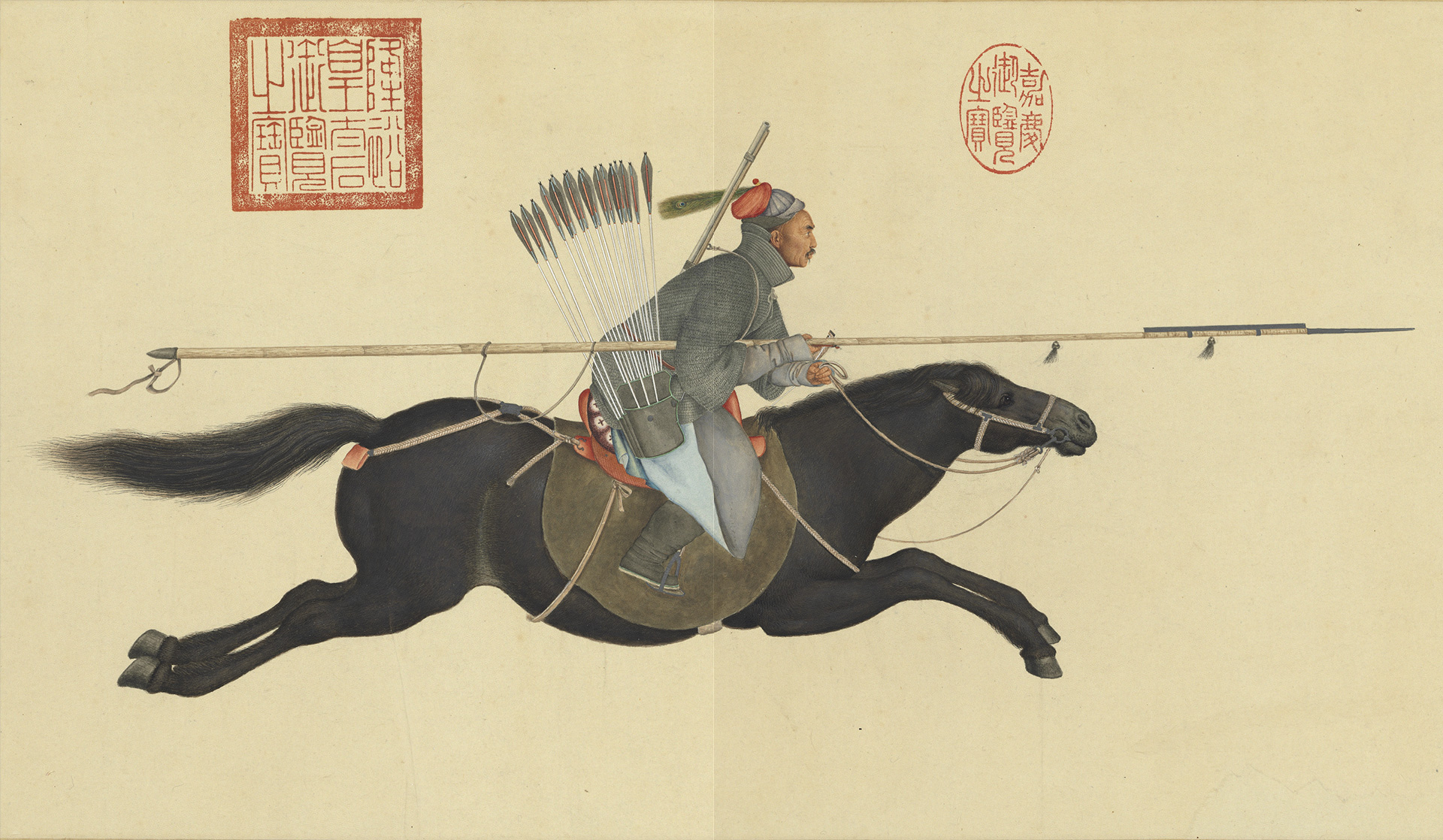
Ayusi

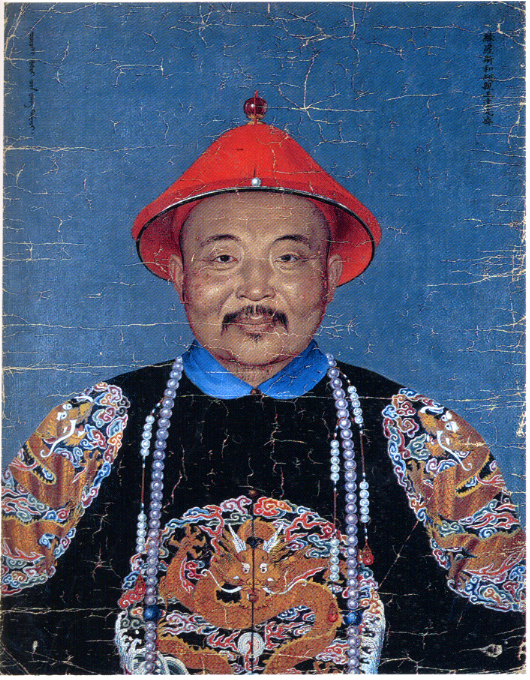
Dawachi, the last ruler of the Dzungar Khanate

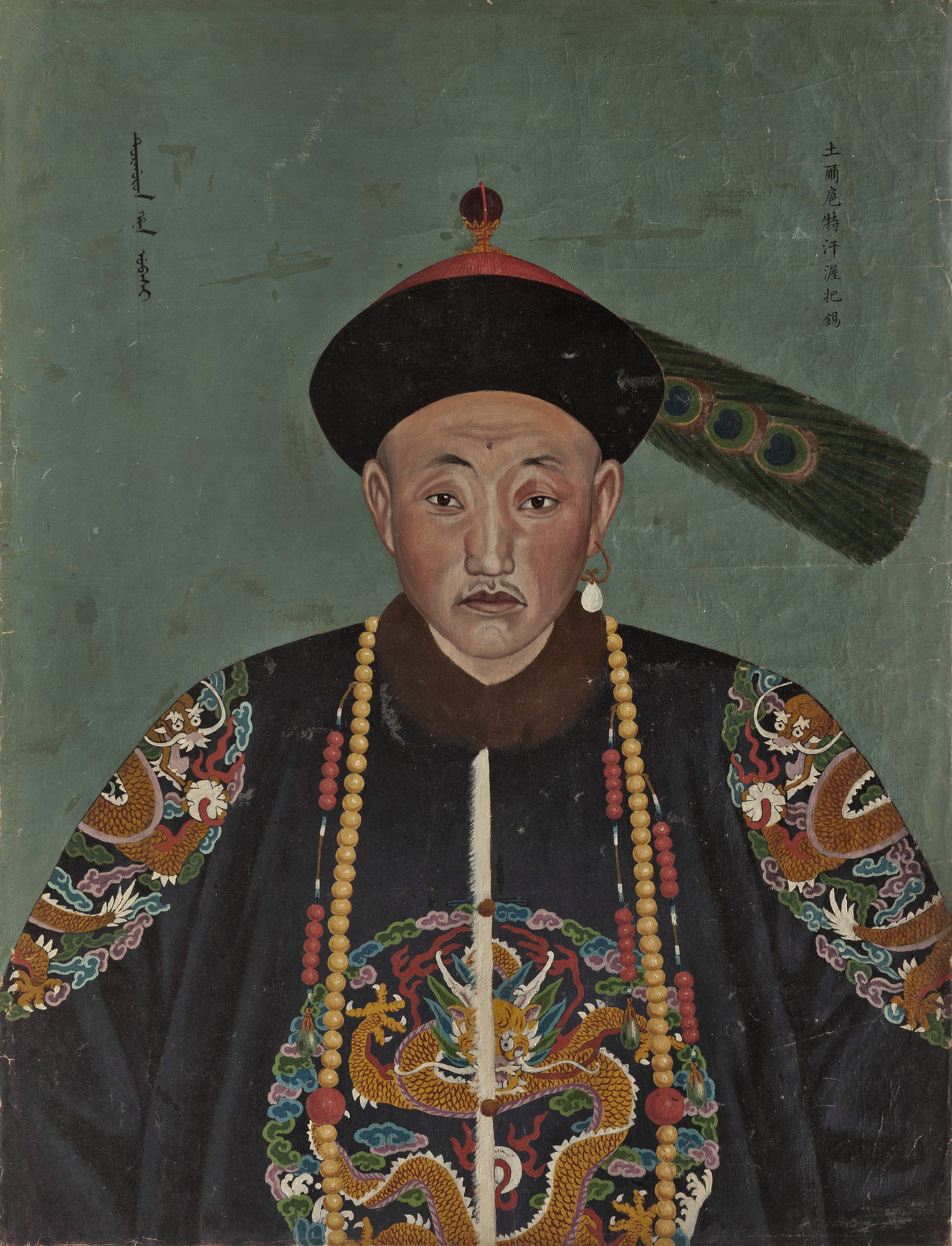
Ubasi, leader of Torgut Mongols

=== In PRC ===
After the founding of the People's Republic of China, the Ziguangge was renovated once again and used as a reception room where state leaders receive foreign guests. The Auditorium of the State Council is connected to the western side of Ziguangge. In the early years after 1949, the State Council Auditorium was used as a movie theatre which held showings several times a week. The building also formerly served as the canteen for State Council staff. This auditorium was updated to its present form in 1979 and is primarily used for ceremonies and conferences on specific policy issues. The plenary sessions of the full State Council are also occasionally convened here as well.

Immediately adjacent to Ziguangge are a variety of other institutions and facilities such as the State Council Research Office and the Zhongnanhai north district's canteen.

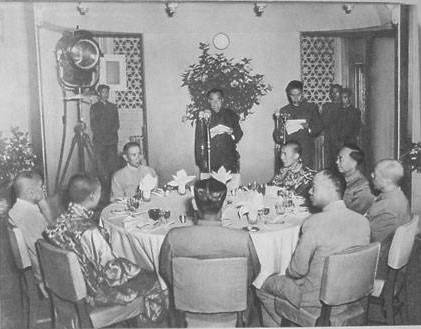
Mao and other high communist officials held a welcome reception for 10th Panchen Lama and 14th Dalai Lama in Ziguangge, 1954

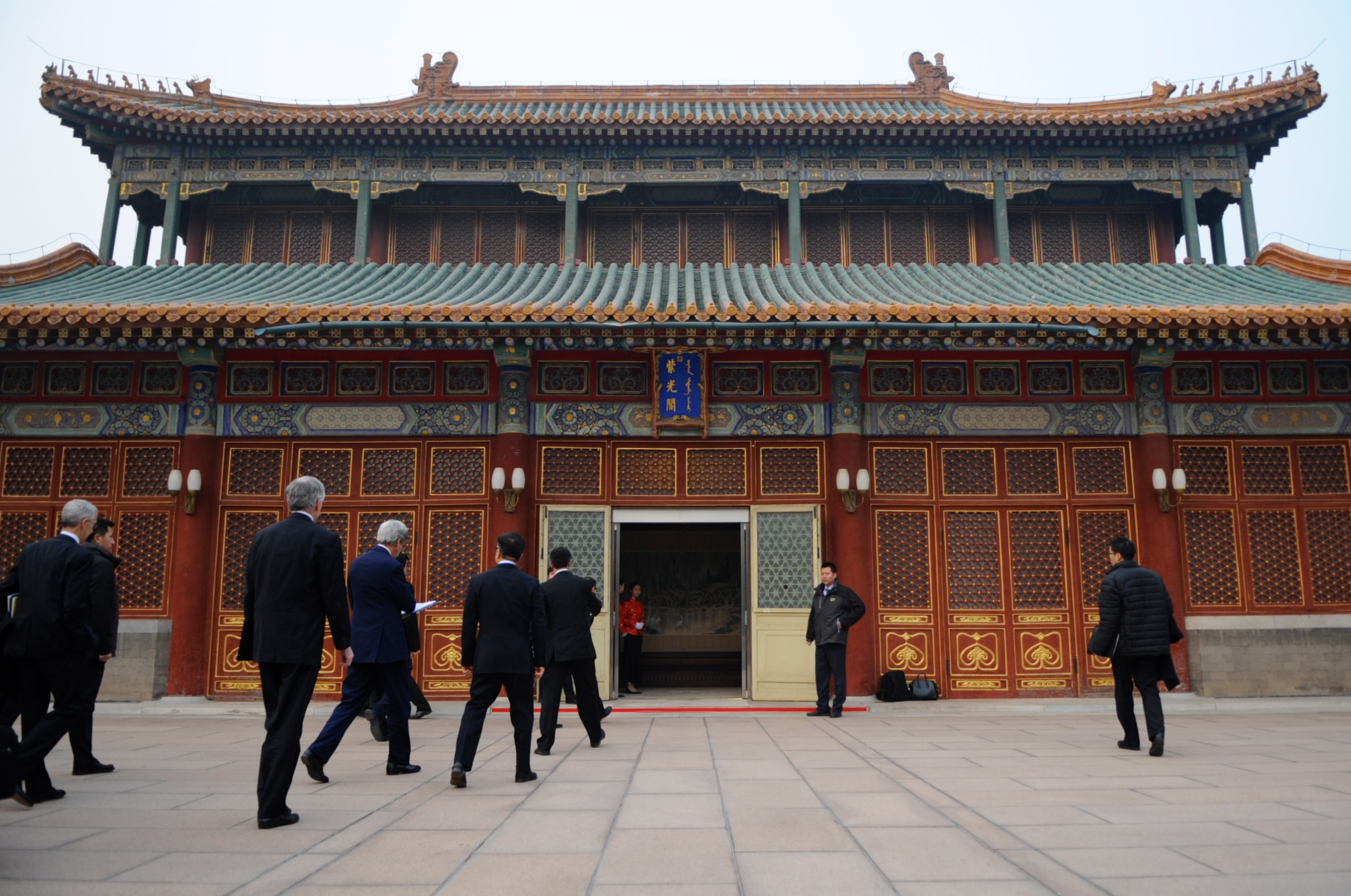
On 14 February 2014, United States Secretary of State John Kerry arrives at the Ziguangge in Zhongnanhai to meet Chinese Premier Li Keqiang

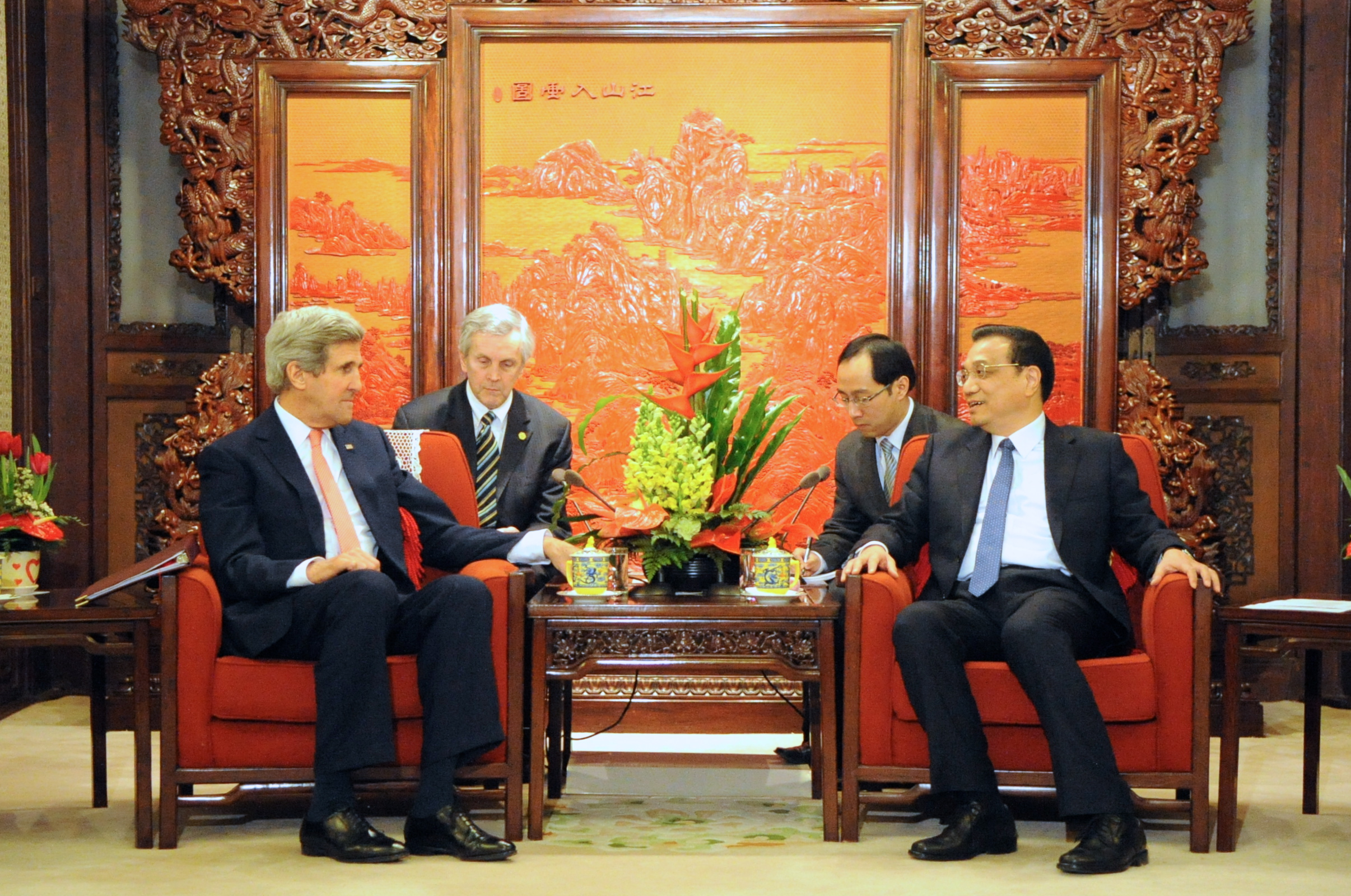
On 14 February 2014, United States Secretary of State John Kerry meets Chinese Premier Li Keqiang at the Ziguangge
