= Wu Yue (actress) =

Chinese actress (born 1972)

- 吴越
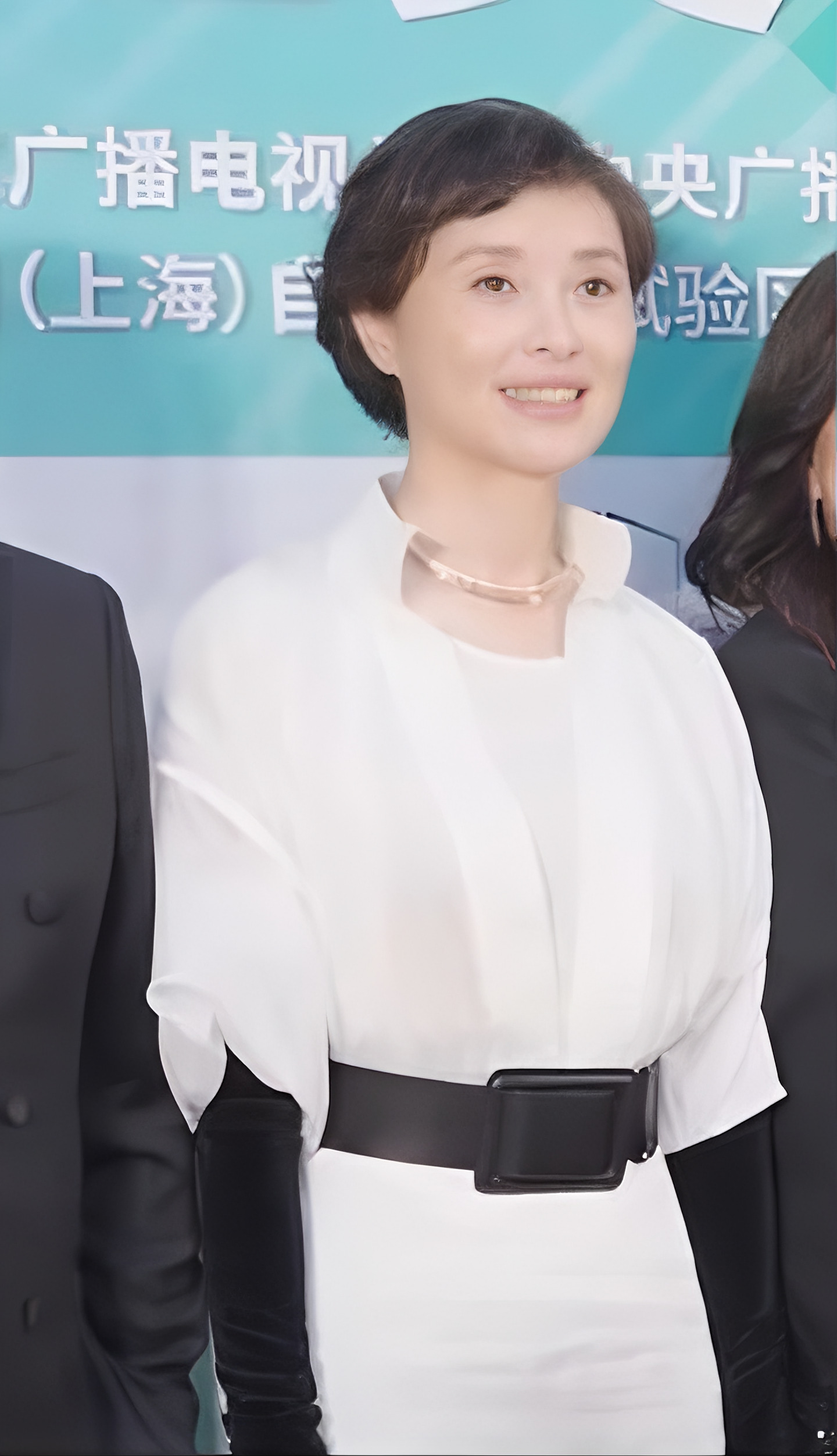
- Wu at the 29th Shanghai Television Festival on June 28, 2024
- Born: April 10, 1972 (age 54); Minhang District, Shanghai, China
- Education: Shanghai Theatre Academy
- Occupation: Actress
- Years active: 1995–present
- Father: Wu Yiren

Chinese name
- Traditional Chinese: 吳越
- Simplified Chinese: 吴越
Transcriptions
Standard Mandarin
- Hanyu Pinyin: Wú Yuè

Wu Yue (Chinese: 吴越; born 10 April 1972) is a Chinese actress, best known in film for portraying Li Weihua in Chrysanthemum Tea, Chen Cuifen in Road to Dawn, and Li Lianqiao in Former Wife, and has received critical acclaim for her television work, particularly as Wen Lu in Age of Peace and Dong Guilan in The Great China Earthquake.

== Biography ==
=== Early life and education ===
Wu Yue was born on April 10, 1972, in Minhang District of Shanghai city. Her father, Wu Yiren (吴颐人), is a calligrapher and painter. After high school, she entered Shanghai Theatre Academy, majoring in acting.

=== Acting career ===
Wu made her acting debut in An Autumn's Story of Beijing, playing Chen Xiaofeng.

In 1996, she appeared in the military television series Age of Peace, which earned her an Outstanding Supporting Actress award at the China TV Golden Eagle Award. That same year, she co-starred with Chen Baoguo and Hu Jun in the romance film Burning Desire.

In 2000, she starred as Li Weihua in Chrysanthemum Tea, for which she won Favorite Actress Award at the 8th Beijing College Student Film Festival.

She won the Most Promising Newcomer Award at the 2007 Shanghai International Film Festival for her performance in the historical romance film Road to Dawn (2007), and was nominated for Best Supporting Actress Award at the 9th Changchun Film Festival and Outstanding Actress Award at the 12th Huabiao Awards.

In 2009, she starred in comedy drama film Glittering Days.

In 2010, she appeared in Qiao Liang's drama film Former Wife, which earned her an Outstanding Actress Award at the 10th Baihe Awards, and was nominated for the Best Actress Award at the 1st Macau International Movie Festival.

In 2013, she appeared in The Great China Earthquake, a disaster television series. The same year, she starred in the historical romantic film The Lady in the Portrait, alongside Fan Bingbing and Melvil Poupaud.

In 2015, she starred in the war film Hundred Regiments Offensive, directed by Ning Haiqiang.

In 2017, Wu starred in the critically acclaimed modern drama The First Half of My Life, which earned her a nomination at the Magnolia Awards.

== Filmography ==
=== Film ===
Year	English title	Chinese title	Role	Ref.
1996	Burning Desire	燃烧的欲望	Chen Xiaofeng	
2001	Chrysanthemum Tea	菊花茶	Li Weihua	
2004	Sleepless City	危情雪夜	Doctor Ye	
2007	Road to Dawn	夜·明	Chen Cuifen	
2009	Glittering Days	万家灯火	Zhang Meng	
2009	Former Wife	前妻	Li Lianqiao	
2012	Flash Marriage Story	闪婚总动员	Du Xuan	
2015	Hundred Regiments Offensive	百团大战	Liang Shan	
2016	The Lady in the Portrait	画框女人	Yi	
2019	Better Days	少年的你	Mother of Chen Nian	

=== Television series ===
Year	English title	Chinese title	Role	Notes/Ref.
1995	An Autumn's Story of Beijing	北京深秋的故事	Chen Xiaofeng	
1996	Age of Peace	和平年代	Wen Lu	
1997	Under One Roof	家和万事兴之在外过年		
1998	Shanghai Story	上海沧桑	Shen Gengping	
1999	Love Story	天地情缘	Meng Jingjing	
2000	Lipstick	口红	Jiang Xiaoge	
2000	Lover Eternal	永恒恋人	Xiaoyu	
2000	Extraordinary Mission	非凡使命	Gao Bingbing	
2001	Hundred Days Love	百日惊情	Qiu Yueqing	
2001	Flavor of Love	爱情滋味	Gu Lihong	
2001	The Distressed Woman	心疼女人	Qin Xiaoyi	
2001	Starry Sky of City	城市的星空	Lu Xiaomi	
2002	Story of the Cooking Team	炊事班的故事	Teacher Wu	
2002	The Fate of Commitment	命运的承诺	Teacher Yu	
2002	Somewhere My Love	情归何处	Chu Meixuan	
2002	Has the Room Not to Hire	有房别出租	Lan Xinmei	
2003	A Literary Family	书香门第	Yan Yu	
2003	Smiling Rose	玫瑰花开	Fang Xin	
2004	Mission of the Criminal Police	刑警使命	Hao Jia	
2004	I Am Not a Hero	我非英雄	Lü Ying	
2004	Within Temptation	深度诱惑	Dong Jiayin	
2005	Watching for Her Love	守望爱情	Lin Xiaoran	
2005	Someone Else is Behind	背后有人	Meng Xiuwen	
2005	Prince Pujun	大阿哥溥俊	Gui Xiang	
2005	Girl and Boy Rushes Forward	男人女人向前走	Yi Pin	
2005	Marry in Chinese Fashion	中国式结婚	Luo Jia	
2006	Story of the General's Family	将门风云	Chen Kexin	
2006	Where Have All The Flowers Gone	那时花开	Liu Yuewen	
2006	Beautiful Life	美丽人生	Zhao Pingping	
2006	The Compound Children	大院子女	Qiao Jianxin	
2007	Sun Life and Death	生死十日	Wu Xiaojin	
2008	Memories In China	中国往事	Wan Yue	
2009	The Secret Blue-Print	秘密图纸	Liu Mei	
2010	City Living	城市生活	Song Yulan	
2010	Chase Your Blues	赶走你的忧郁	Yu Kefei	
2011	Please Forgive Me	请你原谅我	Wu Qing	
2012	My Special Girlfriend	我的非常闺蜜	Chen Jing	
2012	Waiting for our Happiness	远远的爱	Ling Wangxuan	
2013	The Great China Earthquake	唐山大地震	Dong Guilan	
2013	If Life Cheated You	假如生活欺骗了你	Li Ni	
2013	Workers' Compound	工人大院	Qiao Fangcao	
2014	Pull Out the Tigers Teeth	虎口拔牙	Chen Danfeng	
2015	Director of State Letters and Complaints Bureau	信访局长	Tao Ran	
2015	Yangko Dance	大秧歌	Zhao Yumei	
2017	The First Half of My Life	我的前半生	Ling Ling	
2017	Our Family	咱家	Lan Xin	
2018	Women in Beijing	北京女子图鉴	Gu Yingzhen	
2018	Eagles and Youngster	天坑鹰猎	Su Huafen	
2019	Spy Hunter	天衣无缝	Dong Simei	
2019	Empress of the Ming	大明风华	Empress Zhang	
2019	The Best Partner	精英律师		Cameo
2020	Held in the Lonely Castle	清平乐	Liu E	Special appearance
2020	Sisyphus	在劫难逃	Qiao Xin	
2020	My Best Friend's Story	流金岁月	Qi Xin	
2021	Crime Crackdown	扫黑风暴	He Yun	
2023	Blossom Shanghai	繁花	Jin Hua	
TBA	Dear One	亲爱的孩子	Huang Xuanfeng	
TBA	The Smell of Warmth	温暖的味道		
TBA	A Love Never Lost	人生若如初见		

== Awards and nominations ==
Year	Nominated work	Award	Category	Result	Ref.
1997	Age of Peace	15th China TV Golden Eagle Awards	Outstanding Supporting Actress	Won	
2001	Chrysanthemum Tea	8th Beijing College Student Film Festival	Favorite Actress	Won	
2007	Road to Dawn	10th Shanghai International Film Festival	Most Promising Newcomer	Won	
2007	Road to Dawn	12th Huabiao Awards	Outstanding Actress	Nominated	
2008	Road to Dawn	9th Changchun Film Festival	Best Supporting Actress	Nominated	
2009	Former Wife	1st Macau International Movie Festival	Best Actress	Nominated	
2010	Former Wife	10th Baihe Awards	Outstanding Actress	Won	
2018	The First Half of My Life	24th Shanghai Television Festival	Best Supporting Actress	Nominated	
2020	Better Days	35th Hundred Flowers Awards	Best Supporting Actress	Nominated	
2020	—N/a	7th The Actors of China Award Ceremony	Best Actress (Sapphire)	Nominated	
2022	Crime Crackdown	31st China TV Golden Eagle Awards	Best Actress	Nominated	
2022	The Pavilion	4th Asia Contents Awards	Best Supporting Actress	Nominated	
2022	Myth of Love	35th Golden Rooster Awards	Best Supporting Actress	Nominated	
2023	Bright Future	28th Shanghai Television Festival	Best Actress	Won	
2023	Bright Future	14th Macau International Television Festival	Best Actress	Nominated	
2024	Bright Future	32nd China TV Golden Eagle Awards	Best Actress	Nominated	
2024	Blossoms Shanghai	32nd China TV Golden Eagle Awards	Best Supporting Actress	Nominated	
2025	Me and My Family	30th Shanghai Television Festival	Best Supporting Actress	Nominated	
2026	Silent Honor	31st Shanghai Television Festival	Best Actress	Nominated	
2026	Silent Honor	33rd China TV Golden Eagle Awards	Best Actress	Nominated	
2026	Silent Honor	35th Flying Apsaras Awards	Outstanding Actress	Nominated	
