= Tianxia Diyi =

Tianxia Diyi (天下第一; "#1 Under Heaven") may mean:

- All the King's Men (1983 film), Taiwanese film directed by King Hu
- The Royal Swordsmen, 2005 Chinese TV series
