= Lavender (TV series) =

- Promo poster
- Also known as: Xun Yi Cao
- 薰衣草
- Genre: Romance, Melodrama, Slice of life
- Created by: Sanlih E-Television
- Written by: Liu Cai Juan 劉書樺; Fu Hui Zhen 傅慧貞
- Directed by: Liu Jun Jie 劉俊杰
- Starring: Ambrose Hsu 許紹洋; Tammy Chen 陳怡蓉
- Opening theme: Floral Fragrance 花香 by Ambrose Hsu 許紹洋
- Ending theme: Moment of Happiness 幸福的瞬間 by Ambrose Hsu 許紹洋
- Country of origin: Republic of China (Taiwan)
- Original language: Mandarin
- No. of series: 1
- No. of episodes: 15

Production
- Producer: Chen Yu Shan 陳玉珊
- Production location: Taiwan
- Running time: 90 minutes
- Production company: Sanlih E-Television 三立電視

Original release
- Network: SETTV; Indonesia Lativi
- Release: 6 December 2001 – 7 February 2002

Related
- 100% Senorita 千金百分百; My MVP Valentine MVP情人; Lavender 2

Lavender (Chinese: 薰衣草; pinyin: Xun Yi Cao) is a Taiwanese TV serial drama which was broadcast in 2002. It was the first collaboration between Tammy Chen and Ambrose Hsu. Years later, they starred again in another drama by the name Lao Shu Ai Da Mi, with their Lavender co-star, Wang Jian Long.

== Synopsis ==
Ji Qing Chuan and Liang Yi Xun have been best friends since childhood. When Qing Chuan's family decides to migrate to the United States, Qing Chuan gives Yi Xun a bottle with lavender seeds. They promise to reunite after ten years, when the lavender seeds in the bottle will finally bloom.

Ten years later, Qing Chuan fulfills his promise and returns to Taiwan as a popular singer, with the stage name "Leo." Yi Xun and Qing Chuan start to rekindle old feelings. However, Maggie and Xiao Tong try to destroy Yi Xun and Qing Chuan's relationship, and this interference worsens Yi Xun's potentially fatal heart ailment.

== Cast ==
=== Main cast ===
- Ambrose Hsu as Leo Ji Qing Chua (Episode 01-15)

Leo is a Taiwanese popstar who moved to the United States with his parents as a child, leaving behind his elementary school friends. Leo returns to Taiwan to fulfill the promise he made to his girlfriend Liang Yi Xun. Leo and Liang Yi Xun are married and have a child by the end of the series.

- Tammy Chen as Liang Yi Xun (Episode 01-15)

Liang Yi Xun is a childhood friend of Leo, his girlfriend, and eventually his wife. Liang Xi Yun was born with a fatal heart illness which compromises her health throughout the show. She seeks out "Leo" Ji Qing Chuan in an attempt to rekindle their relationship. At the end of the series, they are married and have a child, but she dies in the series' final episode.

- Lin Heng Yi as Liang Yi Chen (Episode 01 -10)

Yi Chen is the older sister of Liang Yi Xun. She and her younger sister share the same fatal illness. Liang Yi Chen is very loving towards her younger sister. In the series, Yi Chen falls in love with Du Xiu Qi and wants to date him; she dies after seeing a sunrise with Du Xiu Qi, which is her last wish.

- Wang Jian Long as Xiao Tong / Tong Wei Sheng

Xiao Tong is Liang Yi Xun's boss; he harbors a crush on her which causes him to be jealous of Leo. He eventually accepts Liang Yi Xun's relationship with Leo and begins dating Jing Jing instead.

=== Supporting cast ===
- Penny Lin as Maggie

Maggie is Leo's girlfriend who works in the superstar agency. She is jealous of Leo's past relationship with Liang Yi Xun at first, but comes to accept their relationship.

- Chen Teng Long as Du Xiu Qi

Du Xiu Qi is the boyfriend of Liang Yi Chen when the series begins. He goes to college in America with her but becomes angry and disappointed after discovering her illness. He harbors feelings of love for Yi Chen until her death.

- Xu Gui Ying as Liang's mother

She is the mother of Liang Yi Xun and Liang Yi Chen. She often fears for her daughters and worries over their health. She tries to prevent either of them from dating or falling in love for fear that it will worsen their heart conditions.

- Hsia Ching Ting as Peter

Leo's manager, he often forbids Leo to meet with fans. While he is arrogant and easily bored at the beginning of the series, he develops into a kind and caring person as the show progresses.

- Rio Peng as reporter

Rio Peng is a reporter who frequently reports on Leo's personal life and relationships.

- Ke Yi Rou as Jing Jing

Jing Jing is Liang Yi Xun's friend and co-worker. She has a crush on her boss Xiao Tong, which is initially unrequited. However, Xiao Tong eventually reciprocates her interests and dates her.

- Chen Qiao En as Xiao Wei

Xiao Wei is a friend of Jing Jing and Yu Xun. She dreams of marrying a rich man and is a devoted fan of Leo.

- Yang Ya Zhu as Xiao Yu

Xiao Yu is a fan of Leo who was born with the same illness same as Yi Xun and Yi Chen. Her wish is to meet Leo face to face, and at the end of the series, undergoes an operation.

- Renzo Liu as Bartender

Renzo Liu is a bartender who helps and offers advice to Leo after he is beaten by street thugs.

== Soundtrack ==
- "Floral Fragrance" 花香 by Ambrose Hsu 許紹洋
- "Moment of Happiness" 幸福的瞬間 by Ambrose Hsu 許紹洋
