= Master Yi =

Master Yi may refer to:

- Yi I (1536–1584), Korean philosopher
- Master Yi, character in 2018 Japanese TV series Inazuma Eleven: Ares
- Master Yi, character in 2019 Chinese TV series See You Again
- Master Yi, League of Legends character voiced by Keiji Fujiwara
