= Penny Lin =

Taiwanese actress

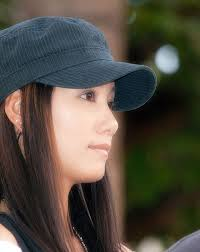
- Born: 7 June 1978 (age 48); Yunlin County, Taiwan
- Occupations: actress, yoga teacher
- Years active: 2000–present

Chinese name
- Traditional Chinese: 林韋君
- Simplified Chinese: 林韦君
Transcriptions
Standard Mandarin
- Hanyu Pinyin: Lín Wéijūn

Penny Lin (Chinese: 林韋君; pinyin: Lín Wéijūn; born June 7, 1978) is a Taiwanese actress.

== Filmography ==
=== Television series ===
Year	English title	Original title	Role	Notes
2000	Spicy Teacher	麻辣鮮師 / 麻辣鲜师 / Málà Xiānshī	Yu Pan-Pan	Supporting Role
2001	Lavender	薰衣草 / Xun Yi Cao	Maggie	Supporting Role
2003	At Dolphin Bay	海豚灣戀人 / 海豚湾恋人 / Hai Tun Wan Lian Ren	Xu Shan Ni	Supporting Role
2003	100% Senorita	千金百分百	Zhuang Fei Yang/ Miss Zhou	Main Role/ Posthumous Character
2007	The Sun Daughter	太陽的女兒 (太阳的女儿) / Tai Yang Te Nu Er (Tai Yang De Nu Er)	Yin Si Jia 尹思嘉 (Episode 4 -41)	Complete Last Work of Beatrice Hsu
2009	Happy Together	青梅竹馬 / 青梅竹马 / Qing Mei Zhu Ma	Wang Jo-Mei	Main Role
2020	Taiwan Story: C1 Torment of the Flower, C2 Longing for the Spring Breeze and C3 Moon Night Sorrow	四月望雨:雨夜花，望春風，月夜愁/ sì yuè wàng yǔ：yu yuehua, wang chunfeng, yue yechou/ Sì—gue̍h Bāng—ú: Ú-iā-hoe, Bāng Chhun-hong, Gua̍t-iā Tshiû/ しがつぼうう: 雨の夜の花, ぼうしゅんぷう, 月の夜の悲しみ	Lin Chiu-qin 林秋琴	Chapter 1(Main Role)→Chapter 2 and 3(Cameo/ Posthumous Character)
2020	Workers	做工的人	Xiu-ling	Supporting Role

=== Movies ===
Year	English title	Original title	Role
2018	Lonely Memory	孤獨的豌豆	Qin
