= See You Again (2019 TV series) =

- Promotional poster
- Also known as: Time Knows Everything
- Genre: Romance; Sci-Fi
- Based on: Time Knows Everything by Sui Houzhu
- Written by: Gao Xuan; Ren Baoru; Zhou Zhan; Cheng Xuefei
- Directed by: Zhong Shujia
- Starring: Tiffany Tang; Shawn Dou; Yang Shuo
- Opening theme: "Time Knows Everything" by Chen Li
- Ending theme: "I Say" by Yida Huang
- Country of origin: China
- Original language: Mandarin
- No. of seasons: 1
- No. of episodes: 45

Production
- Producers: Zhang Meng; Wang Weiyi
- Production locations: Shanghai; England
- Production companies: Good Story Workshop; Fengjing Media

Original release
- Network: Beijing TV
- Release: July 16 – August 7, 2019

See You Again (Chinese: 时间都知道; pinyin: Shíjiān Dōu Zhīdào; lit. 'Time Knows Everything') is a 2019 Chinese television series based on the novel of the same name by Sui Houzhu. It stars Tiffany Tang, Shawn Dou and Yang Shuo. It aired on Beijing TV from July 16 to August 7, 2019.

== Synopsis ==
Shi Jian time travels back to the past in her dreams after a plane crash. Armed with knowledge from the future, she decides to solve all her problems beforehand and win over her future husband Ye Jiacheng from the beginning. Unfortunately, the younger Ye Jiacheng is an overly ambitious lad who also has a knack for breaking ladies’ hearts.

== Cast ==
=== Main ===
- Tiffany Tang as Shi Jian ("Time")
  - Ye Jiacheng's wife. The 31-year-old is confident, intelligent, cynical, affectionate, and also stubborn enough to keep her own ideals. After her plane accident, while still in a coma, she get back into her university day 10 years ago in her dream. On her back-days, she promises herself to save her mother's life and make her ex-boyfriend far from his problem with Yi Qindong, also wants to make her husband fall in love with her in advance. However, the young Jiacheng is so different from her husband that she know. As time goes by, Jiacheng finally changes and falls in love with her.
- Shawn Dou as Ye Jiacheng
  - Shi Jian's husband, a young and promising later famous architect. He is confident, flirtatious, ambitious, unrestrained, loyal to ideals and free-spirited.
- Yang Shuo as Yi Pei
  - CEO of the EMAO company. A mysterious and unpredictable man known with his abstinence, calm, unsmiling and cold exterior due to the brunt of his family which he must bears it. His life can be said too tragic as he was born into a wealthy family yet everything change after he meet Shi Jian, a woman whom he fell in love with.

=== Supporting ===
- Eva Lüyi as Yi Biya
  - Yi Pei's half maternal aunt and Jiacheng's supposed girlfriend. Beautiful, generous and gracious, she was come from a wealthy family but has a weak resolve and little cowardly.
- Lan Yingying as Zhao Wenwen
  - Yi Pei's fiancée who longing and thirsts for a true love, while later truly like and love him.
- Zhou Qiqi as Song Xiaojing
  - A wealthy woman and Jiacheng's ex-girlfriend. They cancelled their marriage plan due to her problems with Jiacheng's personality and relationship, so they are break as a result.
- Mu Le'en as Lai Qiao
  - Shi Jian's close friend and roommate, which she often calls as Qiao-Qiao. A woman who just wants live with her man as nothing else matters.
- Wang Ce as Yi Qindong
  - Ma Qiyue as child Yi Qindong
  - Yi Pei's uncle and sometimes become work-rivals. He has no need for love since he costs and benefits trump all.
- Li Mao as Zhang Kai
  - Yi Pei's subordinate and trusted secretary, Shi Jian's mentor. A person who thinks is it is always safer to be reasonably stupid and holds three philosophies at work and teach it to Shi Jian on her first day training.
- Qian Yongchen as Chang Jin
  - Shi Jian's ex-boyfriend who will do anything for money and work in EMAO company.
- Feng Lijun as Cheng Zisong
  - Lai Qiao's boyfriend and later husband.
- Chai Haowei as Gao Yanfei
  - Jiacheng's close friend who always help him when he needs in help. He is funny and likes to make a humor.
- Chang Kuo-chu as Old Master Yi
  - Yi Pei's grandfather. A businessman who believes that big things depend on larger situations and that a person shouldn't be easily influenced by emotions.
- Gu Yan as Fang Rou / Rose
  - Shi Jian's mother and her "Save-object" after get back into 10 years ago who never wants to trouble her beloved daughter.
- Juan Zi as Yi Biyun, Yi Pei's mother.
- Tang Guozhong as Li Hengli
  - Wenwen's lover and a street film director who likes to plays women.
- Zhang Zhiwei as Professor Song, Xiaojing's father
- Yan Xiaoping as Madam Ye
- Zhao Weilin as Chen Ke

== Production ==
The series began filming on February 24, 2017 at Shanghai and wrapped up on June 19, 2017 at England.

== Soundtrack ==
No.	Title	Lyrics	Music	Singers	Length
1.	"Time Knows Everything (時間都知道)" (Theme song)	Ji Rujing	Yida Huang	Chen Li
2.	"I Say (我說)" (Ending theme song)	Ji Rujing	Yida Huang	Yida Huang
3.	"This Moment (此刻)"	Zeng Shaowei	Zeng Shaowei	Zeng Shaowei
4.	"I Want To Find You (我想找你)"	Zeng Shaowei	Zeng Shaowei	Tiffany Tang

== Reception ==
=== Audience viewership ===
- Highest ratings are marked in red, lowest ratings are marked in blue

Original air date	Beijing Satellite TV CSM59 City ratings		
Original air date	Ratings (%)	Audience share (%)	Rank
2019.7.16	0.766	2.99	6
2019.7.17	0.549	2.17	5
2019.7.18	0.646	2.55	5
2019.7.19	0.601	2.38	5
2019.7.20	0.779	3.1	4
2019.7.21	0.677	2.6	4
2019.7.22	0.902	3.4	4
2019.7.23	0.895	3.45	4
2019.7.24	1.09	4.07	4
2019.7.25	0.95	3.67	4
2019.7.26	0.866	3.43	3
2019.7.27	1.017	4.08	3
2019.7.28	1.058	4.04	3
2019.7.29	1.025	3.9	4
2019.7.30	1.133	4.34	4
2019.7.31	1.11	4.18	5
2019.8.1	1.015	4.03	2
2019.8.2	0.922	3.71	2
2019.8.3	0.846	3.32	2
2019.8.4	0.929	3.58	4
2019.8.5	0.797	3.16	5
2019.8.6	0.792	3.08	5
2019.8.7	0.57	2.29	5

=== Awards and nominations ===
Award	Category	Nominee	Results	Ref.
Golden Bud - The Fourth Network Film And Television Festival	Best Actor	Shawn Dou	Nominated	
Golden Bud - The Fourth Network Film And Television Festival	Best Actress	Tiffany Tang	Nominated	
