= Hands in the Hair =

2005 Chinese-Hong Kong film by Jiang Cheng

- Traditional Chinese: 做頭
- Simplified Chinese: 做头
- Hanyu Pinyin: Zuòtóu
- Directed by: Jiang Cheng
- Written by: Zhang Xian
- Based on: A Beauty by Tang Ying
- Produced by: Stanley Kwan
- Starring: Rosamund Kwan; Wallace Huo; Francis Ng
- Cinematography: Lu Yuqing
- Edited by: Zhu Peipei
- Music by: An dong
- Production companies: Shanghai Film Group Corporation; Shanghai Film Studio
- Distributed by: Sil-Metropole Organisation
- Release dates: 7 March 2005 (China); 14 April 2005 (Hong Kong)
- Running time: minutes
- Countries: China; Hong Kong
- Languages: Mandarin; Cantonese

Hands in the Hair (Chinese: 做頭) is a 2005 romantic drama film directed by Jiang Cheng and produced by Stanley Kwan. A Chinese-Hong Kong co-production, the film stars Rosamund Kwan, Wallace Huo and Francis Ng. It is produced jointly by Shanghai Film Group Corporation and Shanghai Film Studio. The film is an adaptation of Tang Ying's 1995 novel of A Beauty (红颜). The film picks up the extramarital love story of a Shanghai woman named Aini and her lover Ah Hua. Hands in the Hair premiered in mainland China on 7 March 2005 and released in Hong Kong on 14 April 2005.

== Cast ==
- Rosamund Kwan as Aini
- Wallace Huo as Ah Hua
- Francis Ng as Aini's husband
- Yang Lu as Lu Lu
- Zhu Hong as An Weiya
- Mao Yongming as Ah Fu
- Wang Hui as Jin Ping
- Gu Zhujun as Xiao Wang
- Guo Xiaoting as Yao Yao
- Zhan Huakang as the neighbor

== Production ==
Shanghai Film Group Corporation and Shanghai Film Studio bought the film rights to the 1995 novel A Beauty (红颜) written by Tang Ying. Zhang Xian, the husband of Tang Ying, signed on to write the script for the film. While for the most part a faithful retelling of the novel, the screenplay does contain minor deviation.

Director Jiang Cheng revealed that actress Michelle Reis was considered as the female lead at first, after conversation, Jiang Cheng found that she was not suitable for the feminine lead.

The film is notable for lead actress Rosamund Kwan's final film appearance before retiring from acting in 2010.

== Release ==
The film was released on March 7, 2005, in mainland China, and on April 14, in Hong Kong.
