= Wallace Huo =

Taiwanese actor, singer and producer

- 霍建華
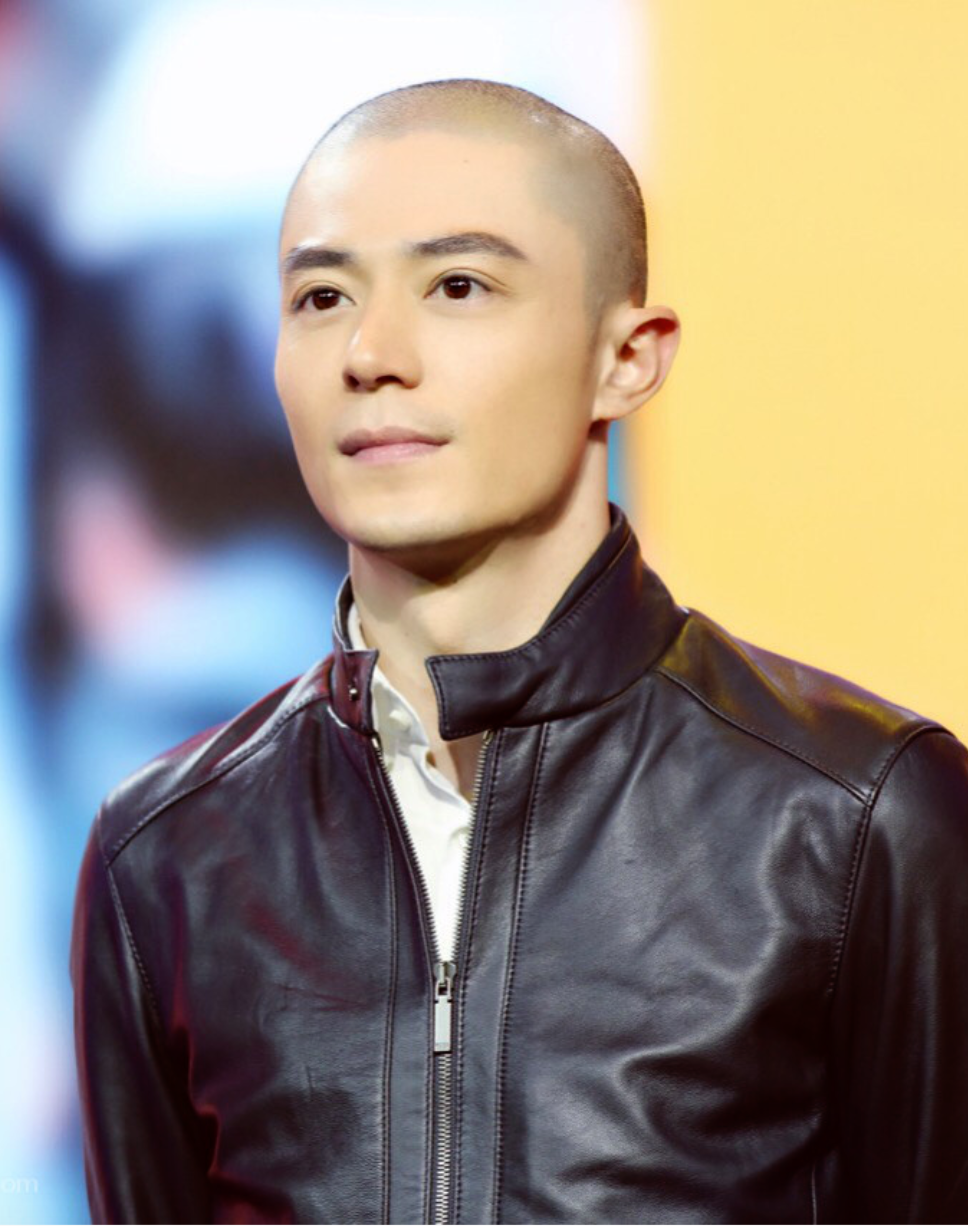
- Huo in November 2016
- Born: Huo Chien-hwa; Taipei, Taiwan
- Education: Nan Chiang Industrial and Commercial Senior High School
- Occupations: Actor; singer; television producer
- Years active: 2002–present
- Agent: Chun Chieh Lien (2011–present) (Huajae Studio (founder))
- Height: 1.77 m (5 ft 10 in)
- Spouse: Ruby Lin (m. 2016)
- Children: 1

Chinese name
- Traditional Chinese: 霍建華
- Simplified Chinese: 霍建华
Transcriptions
Standard Mandarin
- Hanyu Pinyin: Huò Jiànhuá
- Wade–Giles: Huo^{4} Chien^{4}-hwa^{2}
Southern Min
- Hokkien POJ: Hok Kiàn-hôa

Wallace Huo Chien-hwa (Chinese: 霍建華) is a Taiwanese actor and singer. After gaining popularity for the Taiwanese idol drama At Dolphin Bay (2003), he shifted his career to mainland China and became known for his roles in Chinese Paladin 3 (2009), Swordsman (2013), Battle of Changsha (2014), The Journey of Flower (2015), Love Me If You Dare (2015), and Ruyi's Royal Love in the Palace (2018). He took an extended break from acting shortly after marrying and returned with The Tale of Roses (2024), followed by Miracles of the ER (2026).

Huo ranked 82nd on Forbes China Celebrity 100 list in 2014, 48th in 2015, 22nd in 2017, and 66th in 2019.

== Early life ==
Huo was born in Taipei, Taiwan to Liu Yu and Huo Chao-Ku. He has one brother, Huo Chien-yuan. His family originated from Shandong; his parents were natives of Longkou and Tianjin respectively. His grandfather was a follower of Sun Yat-sen and in October 1949, his family moved to Taiwan. Both his parents worked in the court system and his brother is a police officer. His parents divorced when he was young.

Huo once aspired to be a basketball player but then turned to singing in his early teenage days. With the goal of becoming a singer, Huo joined the entertainment business at the age of 17, as the assistant of Taiwanese TV host Sam Tseng.

== Career ==
=== 2002–2004: Beginnings in Taiwan ===
After starring in Star (2002), Huo rose to fame for the idol drama At Dolphin Bay (2003), which achieved a peak rating of 5.11 and became the most popular idol drama of the year. He was then in great demand and was cast in seven idol dramas at the same year (a record yet to be broken).

In 2004, Huo released his first ever solo album Start. Owing to his inability to cope with the promotion tour of the album, he decided to focus on acting thereafter.

=== 2005–2014: Rising popularity in China ===
In 2005, Huo starred in his first wuxia drama The Royal Swordsmen directed by Wong Jing. His melancholic portrayal of Guihai Yidao received rave reviews from fans and audiences. It proved to be an important turning point of his career, as it introduced him to mainland audiences. The same year, Huo made his big screen debut in the movie Hands in the Hair alongside actress Rosamund Kwan.

Huo then took the leading role in various dramas, including Sound of Colors alongside actress Ruby Lin, Romance of Red Dust opposite Shu Qi, and Emerald on the Roof with Sun Li. Huo expressed that his role in Emerald on the Roof had taught him how to act, and has a deep impact on him. Huo also starred in kungfu comedy Love at First Fight, taking on an eccentric and crazy role. His exaggerated expressions and comedic acting showed his ability to take on different roles.

In 2009, Huo rose to mainstream popularity with the hit xianxia drama Chinese Paladin 3, an adaptation from the video game of the same title. In 2011, Huo starred in period action drama The Vigilantes in Masks with Cecilia Liu; and historical drama The Glamorous Imperial Concubine wherein he played a cold and detached Emperor. Due to the success of the dramas, Huo was awarded Most Influential Actor at the 2011 Youku Television Awards.

In 2012, Huo starred in the medical drama Inspire the Life. In 2013, he starred in Lord of Legal Advisors, a mystery series in the Ming dynasty, and Swordsman, a wuxia series based on Jin Yong's classic novel of the same Chinese title. In 2014, Huo starred in Perfect Couple, written by Tong Hua. The project was Huo's first attempt at producing a drama series after the establishment of his own company Huajae Studio, and reunited him with Chinese Paladin 3 co-star Tiffany Tang. Huo won the Most Popular Actor in the ancient drama genre at the 2014 China Student Television Festival for the drama. Huo then starred in Battle of Changsha. Battle of Changsha was a critical success, as one of the highest rated dramas on Douban.

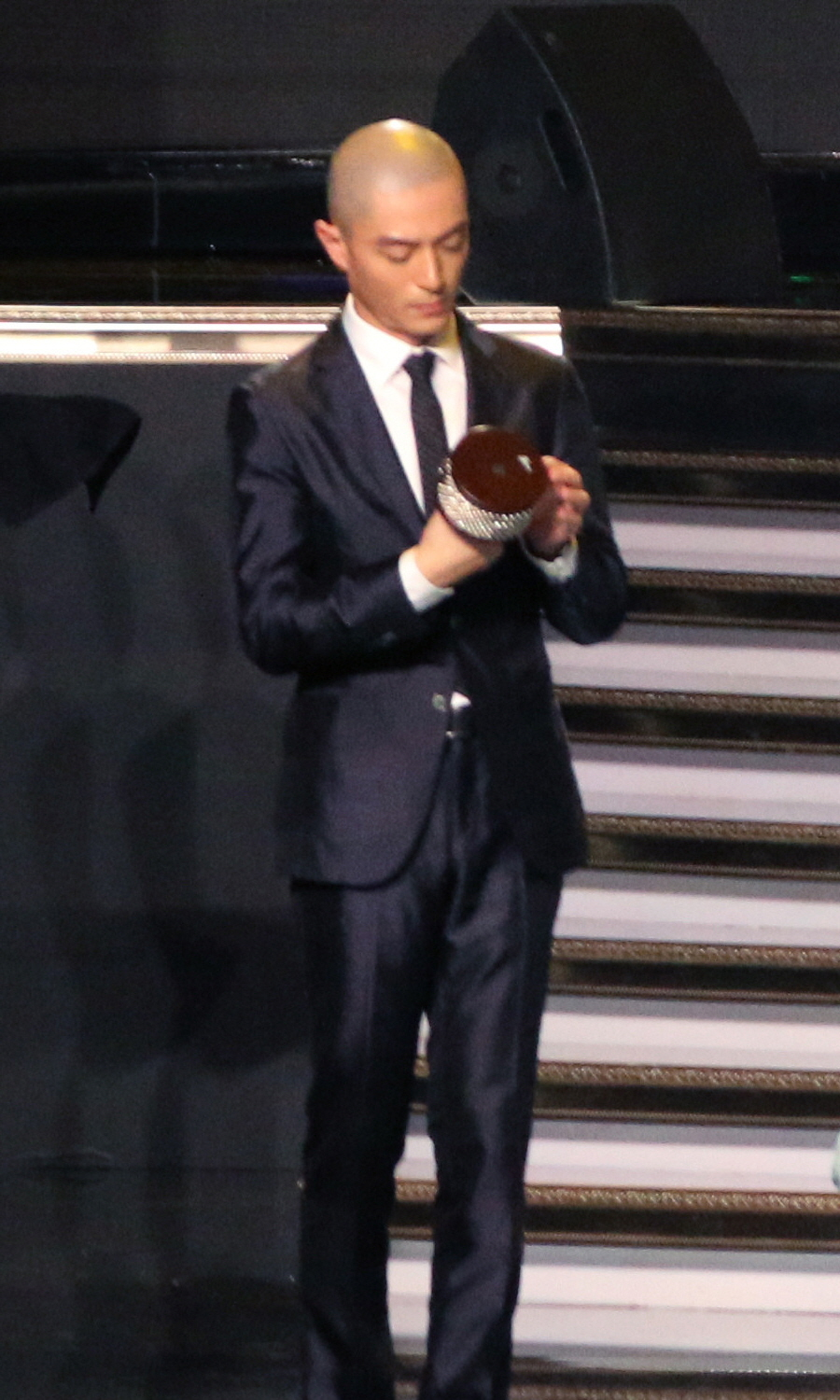
Huo in 2016

=== 2015–2017: Career peak ===
In 2015, Huo starred in xianxia drama The Journey of Flower with Zanilia Zhao. The drama was a huge success in China, achieving a peak rating of 3.89. It is also the first Chinese drama to surpass 20 billion online views. The success of The Journey of Flower brought Huo's career to a new high. He then starred in crime thriller Love Me If You Dare, which received positive reviews and an international following. Due to his success, Huo was chosen by China Newsweek as Artist of the Year. He was distinguished as one of the Most Influential People in China for 2015, a remarkable distinction since he is the only recipient of this award in the field of Performing Arts.

In 2016, Huo starred in historical medical drama The Imperial Doctress, portraying Zhu Qizhen. It was one of the highest rated dramas that year, and Huo was awarded Most Popular Actor and Most Marketable Artist for his performance in The Imperial Doctress as well as Love Me If You Dare at the 1st China Television Drama Quality Ceremony. He next starred in the crime thriller Inside or Outside alongside Korean actor Jang Hyuk and Hong Kong star Simon Yam, as well as romantic comedy film Suddenly Seventeen and suspense thriller Hide and Seek.

In 2017, Huo starred in the science fiction suspense film Reset, produced by Jackie Chan and directed by Korean director, Chang; and war film Our Time Will Come, directed by award-winning director Ann Hui. In 2018, Huo returned to the small screen in the palace drama Ruyi's Royal Love in the Palace playing the role of Qianlong Emperor. In 2019, Huo starred in the period epic drama The Great Craftsman, reuniting with his Chinese Paladin 3 and Reset co-star Yang Mi. The same year, he starred in the romance drama film Somewhere Winter written by Rao Xueman.

=== 2018–present: Hiatus and partial comeback ===
In September 2018, Huo announced the closure of Huajie Studio's Weibo and Facebook accounts, which had been managed by his co-founder and manager, Lian Junjie, effectively shutting down Huo's only social media presence amid an acrimonious breakup with Lian. Since then, Huo has largely retired to family life in Taiwan. In December 2020, Huo shut down another production company under his name in Hengdian. In 2021, he had a cameo in Light the Light, a Taiwanese drama produced by his wife, Ruby Lin. Huo returned to acting in 2024 with the Chinese drama The Tale of Rose. He starred in the Netflix series Miracles of the ER produced by Lin in 2026.

== Personal life ==
On 20 May 2016, Huo confirmed his relationship with actress Ruby Lin, his co-star in Sound of Colors (2006) and The Glamorous Imperial Concubine (2011). They were married in Bali on 31 July 2016, and held another wedding reception in Taipei on 2 August 2016. Their daughter was born in January 2017.

== Filmography ==
=== Film ===
Year	English title	Original title	Role	Ref.
2005	Hands in the Hair	做頭	Ah Hua	
2009	Contract About Interchange Status	变身契约	Mai Zhelun	
2012	Ultra Reinforcement	超时空救兵	Yang Zhiang	
2015	The Honey Enemy	情敌蜜月	Xu Mo	
2016	Inside or Outside	真相禁区	Xie Tianyou / Qiu Le	
2016	Hide and Seek	捉迷藏	Zhang Jiawei	
2016	Suddenly Seventeen	28岁未成年	Mao Liang	
2017	Reset	逆时营救	Cui Hu	
2017	Our Time Will Come	明月幾時有	Li Jinrong	
2017	The Founding of an Army	建军大业	Chiang Kai-shek	
2019	Somewhere Winter	大约在冬季	Qi Xiao	

=== Television series ===
Year	English title	Original title	Role	Notes/Ref.
2002	Star	摘星	Xia Yuanqiao	
2003	Pretty Girl	美丽俏佳人	Fu Liheng	
2003	The Great Teacher	麻辣鲜师	Huo Jianqi	Cameo
2003	My Secret Garden	我的秘密花园	Li Wei / Huo Jianhua	Cameo
2003	At Dolphin Bay	海豚灣戀人	Zhong Xiaogang	
2003	Westside Story	西街少年	Xingwang	
2004	100% Senorita	千金百分百	Li Weixiang	
2005	The Royal Swordsmen	天下第一	Guihai Yidao	
2005	Romance of Red Dust	风尘三侠之红拂女	Li Jing	
2006	Sound of Colors	地下铁	Lu Yunxiang	
2006	Emerald on the Roof	屋顶上的绿宝石	Zhou Nianzhong	
2007	Love at First Fight	武十郎	Li Yashou	
2008	Rouge Snow	胭脂雪	Xia Yunkai	
2008	A Mobile Love Story	爱情占线	Lu Yunfei	
2008	Modern Beauty	现代美女	Yang Guang	
2008	Love in the Forlon City	伤城之恋	Yan Fei	
2009	Chinese Paladin 3	仙剑奇侠传三	Xu Changqing	
2010	New One Plum Blossom	新一剪梅	Zhao Shijun	
2010	Detective Tanglang	唐琅探案	Tang Lang	
2010	Go Yi Yi Go	一一向前冲	Cao Yan	
2011	The Vigilantes in Masks	怪侠一枝梅	Li Gexiao	
2011	The Glamorous Imperial Concubine	倾世皇妃	Liu Liancheng	Special appearance
2011	Inspire the Life	感动生命	Han Zihang	
2012	Lord of Legal Advisors	刑名师爷	Meng Tianchu	
2013	Swordsman	笑傲江湖	Linghu Chong	
2014	Perfect Couple	金玉良缘	Jin Yuanbao	also co-producer
2014	Incisive Great Teacher	犀利仁师	Li Daren	Cameo
2014	Battle of Changsha	战长沙	Gu Qingming	
2014	The Great Protector	镖门	Liu Anshun	
2015	The Journey of Flower	花千骨	Bai Zihua	
2015	Love Me If You Dare	他来了，请闭眼	Bo Jingyan / Simon Allen	
2016	The Imperial Doctress	女医·明妃传	Yingzong Emperor	
2018	Ruyi's Royal Love in the Palace	如懿传	Qianlong Emperor	
2019	The Great Craftsman	筑梦情缘	Shen Qinan	
2021	Light the Night	華燈初上	Ma Tien-hua	
2024	The Tale of Rose	玫瑰的故事	Fu Jiaming	
2026	Miracles of the ER	急診室的奇蹟	Chou Cheng-chun	

== Discography ==
=== Albums ===
Year	English title	Original title	Album information
2004	Start	开始	Language: Mandarin; Label: Sony Music; Genre: Mandopop

=== Singles ===
Year	English title	Original title	Album	Notes
2002	"Picking Stars"	摘星	Star OST	
2002	"Love is like Cotton Candy"	爱像棉花糖	Star OST	with Romi Li
2002	"Come and Go Freely"	来去自如	Star OST	
2002	"Happiness under the Umbrella"	伞下的幸福	Star OST, My Secret Garden OST	
2003	"Somebody"	—N/a	100% Senorita OST	
2005	"Your Number One"	你的第一	The Royal Swordsmen OST	
2005	"That Time"	那时候	The Royal Swordsmen OST	
2007	"Angel's Wings"	天使的翅膀		in memory of Beatrice Hsu; with various artists
2011	"Pass Away"	倾世	The Glamorous Imperial Concubine OST	
2013	"Free and Unfettered"	逍遥	Swordsman OST	
2014	"I Will Remember You"	我会记得你	Battle of Changsha OST	with Yang Zi
2014	"Good Times"	好时光	Perfect Couple OST	with Ding Dang
2015	"Not to Mention"	不可说	The Journey of Flower OST	with Zhao Liying

=== Music video appearances ===
Year	Song title	Singer	Notes
1997	"Love Story of Music" (音乐爱情故事)	Saya Chang	
2000	"Want to Escape" (想逃)	Kang Chin-chung	
2003	"The Map of Love" (幸福的地图)	Elva Hsiao	
2006	"Big Fool" (大傻)	Miriam Yeung	
2017	"Psudo-Single, Yet Single" (未单身)	A-Lin	

== Awards and nominations ==
Major awards
Year	Award	Category	Nominated work	Result	Ref.
2004	39th Golden Bell Awards	Best Actor	At Dolphin Bay	Nominated	
2016	22nd Shanghai Television Festival	Best Actor	The Journey of Flower	Nominated	
2017	20th Shanghai International Film Festival	Best Actor	Our Time Will Come	Nominated	
Other awards
Year	Award	Category	Nominated work	Result	Ref.
2011	Youku Television Awards	Most Marketable Actor	The Glamorous Imperial Concubine	Won	
2013	8th Chinese TV Audience Festival	Top Ten Actors	Swordsman	Won	
2014	5th China Student Television Festival	Most Popular Actor (Ancient Drama)	Perfect Couple	Won	
2014	6th China TV Drama Awards	Most Popular Couple (with Tiffany Tang)	Perfect Couple	Won	
2014	6th China TV Drama Awards	Most Popular Actor (Hong Kong/Taiwan)	Perfect Couple, Battle of Changsha	Won	
2014	iQIYI All-Star Carnival	Best Television Actor (Hong Kong/Taiwan)	Perfect Couple, Battle of Changsha	Won	
2015	China Newsweek	Artist of the Year	—N/a	Won	
2015	iQiyi All-Star Carnival	Most Popular Actor	The Journey of Flower	Won	
2015	7th China TV Drama Awards	Most Popular Actor	The Journey of Flower	Won	
2015	7th China TV Drama Awards	Audience's Favorite Character	The Journey of Flower	Won	
2016	2015 Conference on Big Data Index of Culture and Entertainment	Most Popular Character	The Journey of Flower	Won	
2016	1st China Quality Television Drama Ceremony	Most Marketable Actor	The Journey of Flower, The Imperial Doctress	Won	
2016	1st China Quality Television Drama Ceremony	Most Popular Actor	The Journey of Flower, The Imperial Doctress	Won	
2016	3rd Asia Rainbow TV Awards	Best Actor (Historical Drama)	The Journey of Flower, The Imperial Doctress	Nominated	
2016	19th Huading Awards	Best Actor	The Journey of Flower, The Imperial Doctress	Nominated	
2016	19th Huading Awards	Best Actor (Contemporary Drama)	Love Me If You Dare	Nominated	
2018	24th Huading Awards	Best Actor	Ruyi's Royal Love in the Palace	Nominated	
