= Inside or Outside =

- Film poster
- Traditional Chinese: 真相禁區
- Simplified Chinese: 真相禁区
- Hanyu Pinyin: Zhēnxiàng Jìnqū
- Jyutping: Zan1 Seong3 Gam3 Keoi1
- Directed by: Gary Mak
- Written by: Zhong Muxuan
- Produced by: Pan Yang; Yan Pangtao; Zhang Weiyan; Fan Chongjun; Bao Hongnian; Luo Rongxia; Li Huiling
- Starring: Simon Yam; Wallace Huo; Jang Hyuk; Rayza; Che Xiao
- Cinematography: Lin Zejin
- Edited by: Lin Yung-yi
- Production companies: Sichuan Rewo Media; Beijing Dingfengchuanqi Media; Shenzhen Chuangtian Entertainment Investment; Jinyinguo (Xiamen) Media; Shenzhen QianHai Moer Media; Yaobang (Xiamen) Investment; Shenzhen Jinan Shareholding; Fuxing Quanya Media (Shanghai); Beijing WangZhiTianYuan Technology Shareholding; Bohuna (Beijing) Pictures; Taiwan Rewo Culture Media; Dongguang Xianqin Culture Media
- Distributed by: Beijing Dingfengchuangqi Media; Star Explore Culture Communication; Tianjin Yinhe Media; Medialinks Capital; Keranbing Media (Beijing)
- Release date: 22 January 2016
- Running time: 109 minutes
- Country: China
- Language: Mandarin

Inside or Outside is a 2016 Chinese action thriller directed by Gary Mak and written by Zhong Muxuan. The film stars Simon Yam, Wallace Huo, Jang Hyuk, Rayza and Che Xiao. The film was released in China on 22 January 2016.

== Cast ==
- Simon Yam as Fei Xin, a detective of high intelligence.
- Wallace Huo as Xie Tianyou, a hacker.
- Wallace Huo as Qiu Le, a police officer.
- Jang Hyuk as Ou Jian, a software designer.
- Rayza as Nan Fang, a fairy tale young writer.
- Che Xiao as Shen Jiamei, a fashion designer, Du Bi's wife and Nan Fang's best friend,

=== Special appearance ===
- Jack Kao as Du Bi, the gang leader.
- Andrew Lin as Chen Chaoyi, a detective.
- Han Ji-seok as South Korean gang young leader.
- Aisa Senda as Tang Shan
- Fu Lei as Director Wu

== Production ==
Production began in Taiwan on 14 April 2015.

On 21 June 2015, the film crew attended the 18th Shanghai International Film Festival.

On 16 November 2015, the theme song, Inside or Outside, was released. The ending theme, The Truth, was released on 3 December.

== Music ==
- Theme song: Inside or Outside (《真相禁区》), lyrics by Zhong Muxuan, composed by Tan Yizhe, sung by Aska Yang.
- Ending theme: The Truth (《真相》), lyrics by Dai Baojing, Ti Yi'en and Li Tingyao, composed by Dai Baojing and Ti Yi'en, sung by Dai Baojing and Aisa Senda,

== Release ==
The film premiered in Beijing on 18 January 2016 with wide-release in China on 22 January.
