= Wang Kai (Taiwanese actor) =

Taiwanese actor (1982–2026)

- 王建隆
- Born: Wang Jianlong; October 11, 1982; Kaohsiung, Taiwan
- Died: July 26, 2026 (aged 43); Daan District, Taiwan
- Education: Kaohsiung Municipal Lingya Junior High School; Nanqiang Senior High School of Industry and Commerce; Chenggong Elementary School, Lingya District, Kaohsiung City
- Occupation: Actor
- Years active: 2001–2026
- Agent: Yale Entertainment

Wang Jianlong (Chinese: 王建隆; pinyin: Wáng Jiànlóng; October 11, 1982 – July 26, 2026), also known as Wang Kai, was a Taiwanese actor.

== Early life and career ==
Wang Jianlong was born in Kaohsiung on October 11, 1982. He was the only boy among three children his parents had. He studied at Kaohsiung Municipal Chenggong Elementary School. He then studied in high school at Lingya Junior High School and at Nan Chiang Vocational High School in New Taipei City. After graduating from high school, he went to Taipei to sell clothes in a department store. He was discovered by an agent and debuted. At the age of 18, he got the role in a Taiwanese drama called Lavender. However, his acting career was blocked afterward. He went to Beijing to seek opportunities to invest. He returned to Taiwan to work as a public relations manager and worked at Huang Licheng's nightclub.

In 2011, Wang adopted a new stage name called Wang Kai. Following roles in the PTS drama series Snake Staff and Kids and Adults, he appeared in many television series such as Holding Hands and Love in the World. He achieved a major career breakthrough in 2014 portraying in After the Rain, which brought him widespread popularity and commercial ad deals. He purchased a home for his parents in Kaohsiung. He also starred in several series including Haru, Go! Meiling, City of Love, and The Rich and Powerful. He was nicknamed the best boyfriend in Taiwanese dramas.

== Personal life and death ==
In 2019, Wang broke up with his girlfriend, Zhong Xingyi, outside the entertainment industry after dating for two years, and then suffered a series of sad news, including the death of his father who had been bedridden for more than 20 years due to a stroke and the passing of his beloved cat.

On July 25, 2026, around 17:00, Wang finished filming an upcoming drama and went home. The next day, he was found dead at his residence at noon. He was 44. Wang's neighbour found that the door of his rented house was not completely locked and that the breakfast delivered had not been picked up for more than 6 hours. He went in to check and found Wang lying on the living room floor without any signs of life. The time of death was less than 12 hours. The police then sealed off the scene to collect evidence.

== Performance works ==
=== Television ===
Year	Network	Title	Role
2001	TTV / SET Metropolitan Channel	Lavender	Tong Weisheng
2002	FTV	Super Popular Academy	Li Guoqiang
2002	CTV	Stars in the Snow	Wang Jianlong
2002	CTS	Dormitory No. 4	Zhang Zhefu
2002	Mainland China	Spicy Girlfriend	Cheng Yixuan
2003	Star Chinese Channel	The Pawnshop No. 8	Peter
2004	CTS / SET Metropolitan Channel	Snow Angel	Skinny Monkey
2005	PTS	Ping Pong	Chen Lie
2005	CTS	Reaching for the Stars	Yang Cheng-han
2006	FTV	Wrong Love	Jin Haonan
2006	Mainland China	Mice Love Rice	Fee Sheep
2008	PTS	Marzio on the Scales	Zhang Zhenghao
2009	CTV / GTV	Love Means Staying Home Together	BEN
2010	Sanlih Taiwan	Harmony in the Family Brings Prosperity in All Things	Liao Junzhong
2012	CTS	Gentle Compassion	Mike
2012	CTV	Fondant Garden	ALAN
2012	PTS	Caduceus	Wang Xin
2012	PTS	Children and Adults	Xia Xuntao
2012	Sanlih Taiwan	Rainy Night Flower	Li Zhushan
2012	Sanlih Taiwan	Holding Hands	Kuroki Sawa / Zhao Ze
2013	Sanlih Taiwan	Love in the World / Worldly Affairs	Guo Wenyang
2014	TTV	After the Rain / Sunshine After the Rain	Wang Tianbao
2015	TTV	Chunmei	Chen Wenqian
2016	TTV	Go! Meiling	Zhuang Zhicheng
2016	PTS	What Would You Like to Order Tonight?	Xie Lihua
2017	Formosa TV	City Love Songs	Yu Yu-shi
2017	CTS	Spring Breeze by the Love River	Lin Jiawei
2019	FTV	A City of Passion	Yang Chenghao
2022	FTV	The Rich and Powerful / Commoners and the Wealthy	Li Junhao / Jiang Junhao
2025	Sanlih Taiwan	Life's Many Flavors	Xu Jinghan (Ethan)

=== MV ===
Year	Artist	Song Title
2019	Princess Ai	"Love Me For Now"
2022	Huanhuan	"The Heartbroken Huan"
2023	Beverly	"The Flower of Happiness"
