= Pandamen =

- Hong Kong DVD cover

Chinese name
- Traditional Chinese: 熊貓人
- Simplified Chinese: 熊猫人
Transcriptions
Standard Mandarin
- Hanyu Pinyin: Xióngmāo Rén
- Genre: Action; Crime; Sci-Fi
- Directed by: Jay Chou
- Starring: Jay Chou; Yuhao Zhan; Devon Song; Jessie Chiang; Tiffany Tang
- Theme music composer: Yuhao Zhan
- Opening theme: Pandamen (熊貓人) by Yuhao Zhan and Devon Song (Nan Quan Mama)
- Ending theme: The Last Page (最後一頁) by Jessie Chiang
- Composer: Yuhao Zhan
- Country of origin: Republic of China (Taiwan)
- Original language: Mandarin
- No. of episodes: 20

Production
- Production locations: Taipei, Taiwan; Shanghai, China; Xiamen, Fujian, China
- Running time: 70 minutes

Original release
- Network: CTS
- Release: 5 February – 18 June 2010

Pandamen (traditional Chinese: 熊貓人; simplified Chinese: 熊猫人) is a 2010 Taiwanese TV series directed by and starring Jay Chou and co-starring Nan Quan Mama members Yuhao Zhan and Devon Song in the title roles of "Pandamen".

== Cast ==
=== Main cast ===
Cast	Role	Description
Jay Chou	Detective Leo Lee 李奧	City of Brightness Sheriff
Yuhao Zhan	Pan Da 潘達	The Panda Superman (熊貓超人); Prince of the Pan Enterprises; Piano teacher at JVR School; Jiang Xiao Yu's lover turned boyfriend
Devon Song	Chi Nan Jie 赤南介	The Panda Hero (熊貓俠); Kuang Ming City Zoo staff Has strong abilities Lia Lee's lover turned boyfriend
Jessie Chiang (江語晨)	Jiang Xiao Yu 江小語	Piano teacher Pan Da's lover turned girlfriend
Tiffany Tang	Lia Lee 李俐亞	Birth name: Lee Linen (李琳恩); Chef; Lee Chen Yuan's daughter Chi Nan Jie's lover turned girlfriend
Wang Jing (王晶)	Lu Si Qing 路詩晴	Journalist
Guo Xiao Zhong (郭堯中)	Shuai An Ge (Angus) 帥安格	Piano teacher
Tien Jing Quan (田京泉)	Wang Hu 王虎	Leader of the Kuang Tian Organization
Lee Kuo Hsien (李國修)	Lee Chen Yuan 李振遠	Scientist; Crystal Control and Mind Control Device creator Lia Lee's father Now a bum

=== Other cast ===
Cast	Role	Description
Jiu Kung (九孔)	Qiang Shu 錢鼠	Wang Hu's follower
An Che-hao (安澤豪)	Principal 校長	JVR School principal Chiang Xiao Yu's father
Edison Huang (黃懷晨)	Bei Dou 北斗	Wang Hu's follower
Du Kuo-chang (杜國璋)	Du 老杜	Pan Da's housekeeper
Liao Chien-ling (廖劍玲)	Tiger Girl 虎女	Wang Hu's follower
Chiu Kai-wei (邱凱偉)	Darren	Officer part of Leo's team
Yang Chang-ching (楊常青)	Chun 純	Officer part of Leo's team
Da Cheng (大成)	Hei 黑	
Yeh Tien-lun	Wu Long 烏龍	
Huang Tai-an (黃泰安)	Mai 阿麥	
Lee Cho-en (李卓恩)	Eric	
Liu Hsu-hao (劉序浩)	Wang Lu 王路	Boxer; Han Han's father
Moon Wang (王月)	Mama Shen 媽媽桑	
Huang Chun-lang (黃俊郎)	Chen Chao 陳超	
Lee Chi-chin (李之勤)		Lia's mother
Zheng Wan-hsuang (鄭禹瑄)	Han Han 涵涵	Wang Lu's daughter
Yuan Hsiao-yu (袁曉旭)	Zheng Xin Qi 鄭心綺	
Kuo Ke-yu (郭柯宇)	Ma Fen 馬芬	
Yeh Hung-ting (葉泓廷)	Liu Mang 劉蟒	
Lin Hsin-hsiang (林新祥)	Chen Jin 陳晉	
Liang Hsiu-chih (梁修治)		Mayor
Da Chong (太融)		Follower
Melton Morrison		a prisoner

=== Guest star ===
Cast	Role	Description
Eric Tsang	Pan Da's father 潘達父	(Deceased)
Jerry Yan	Detective Chan 陳警探	Leo Lee's colleague
Shawn Yue	Luo Han 羅漢	Wang Hu's follower, resigned because of rivalry with Chang Lang
Will Pan	Jason	Liya's ex-boyfriend
Vincent Fang	Shan Yang 山羊	Wang Hu's follower
Will Liu	Can Lang 殘狼	Wang Hu's follower
Cindy Yen	Cindy	Piano Competition champion

== Viewership ratings ==
Episode	Air date	Average point	Rank	Highest point
1	5 February 2010	0.77	4	
2	12 February 2010	0.60		
3	19 February 2010	0.48		
4	26 February 2010	0.47		
5	5 March 2010	0.36		
6	12 March 2010	0.32		
