= Tiffany Tang =

Chinese actress (born 1983)

- 唐嫣
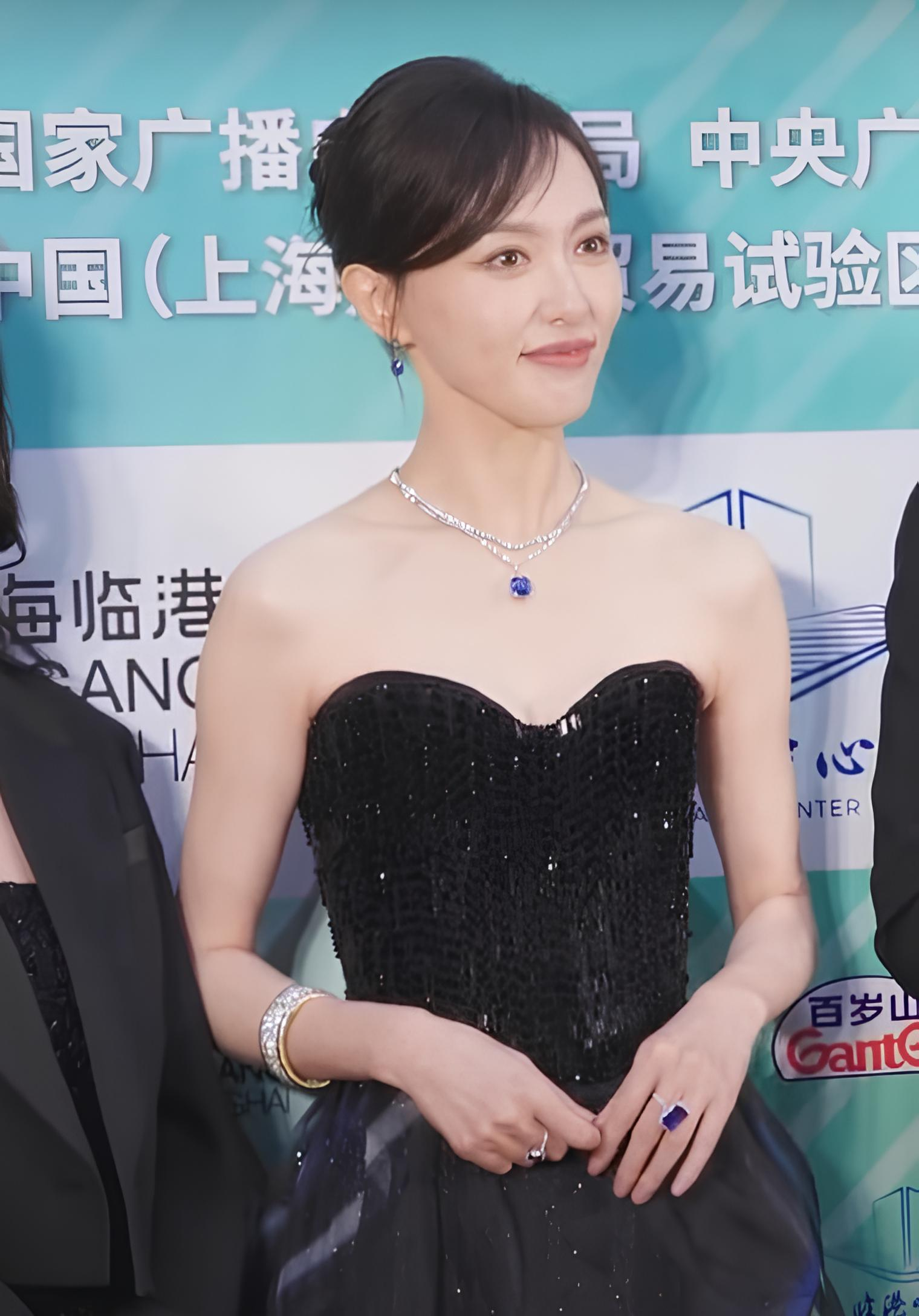
- Tang in June 2024
- Born: Tang Yan; 6 December 1983 (age 42); Shanghai, China
- Education: Central Academy of Drama
- Occupations: Actress; singer
- Years active: 2003–present
- Agent: Tang Yan Studio
- Spouse: Luo Jin (m. 2018)
- Children: 1

Chinese name
- Chinese: 唐嫣
Transcriptions
Standard Mandarin
- Hanyu Pinyin: Táng Yān

Tang Yan (Chinese: 唐嫣; pinyin: Táng Yān, born 6 December 1983), also known as Tiffany Tang, is a Chinese actress and singer. She is known for her roles in the television series Chinese Paladin 3 (2009), My Daughters (2011), Perfect Couple (2014), My Sunshine (2015), The Princess Weiyoung (2016), and Blossoms Shanghai (2023).

== Career ==
=== 2007–2008:Beginnings ===
In 2001, Tang took part in the 3rd "Shulei Century Star" competition, and won the champion award. In 2004, Tang was selected as one of the 14 "Olympic Babies" by director Zhang Yimou and performed at the closing ceremony of the Athens 2004 Summer Olympics.

In 2007, Tang made her acting debut in the historical television series Carol of Zhenguan. The same year, she starred in the romance film Farewell For Love. She received positive reviews for her performance in the film and was nominated as Best Actress at the Shanghai Film Festival and as Best New Actress at the Beijing College Student Film Festival.

=== 2009–2014: Rising popularity ===
In 2009, Tang rose to fame after starring in fantasy action drama Chinese Paladin 3, adapted from the video game of the same title. Tang's portrayal of Zi Xuan and her chemistry with Wallace Huo drew positive reviews from the audience. The same year, she played the role of Chu Chu in the wuxia fantasy film The Storm Warriors.

In 2010, Tang co-starred alongside Jay Chou in the Taiwanese science fiction television series Pandamen and sang the theme song of the drama, "Love Attraction", composed especially for her character.

In 2011, Tang played Xia Tianmei in the metropolitan romance drama My Daughters, which topped television ratings during its time slot and became the highest rated drama broadcast by Anhui TV that year. She reunited with her My Daughters co-star Roy Qiu the same year in the romance comedy drama Waking Love Up, which also became one of the highest rated dramas of the year. Tang saw a further rise in popularity, and won several popularity awards at local award ceremonies.

In 2012, Tang co-starred in fantasy action drama Xuan-Yuan Sword: Scar of Sky, adapted from the popular role-playing game Xuan-Yuan Sword, as the demoness Dugu Ningke. The drama topped TV ratings and garnered 2 billion views online, becoming the 9th drama in Hunan TV's broadcast history. The same year she starred in the period romance war drama A Beauty in Troubled Times. Tang also left her company Orange Sky Entertainment Group mid-2012 to set up her own studio.

In 2013, Tang starred in the action romance drama Agent X, portraying an elite secret agent. She was nominated for the Best Actress award at the Huading Awards for her performance and was named Most Commercially Valuable Actress of the year at the China TV Drama Awards.

In 2014, Tang reunited with Chinese Paladin 3 co-star Wallace Huo in Perfect Couple, a historical romantic comedy written by Tong Hua. The drama topped online views and became a hot topic, winning Tang and Huo the Best Couple award at the China TV Drama Awards and Tang the Most Popular Actress award at the China Student Television Festival. The same year, she starred in the romance film For Love or Money as a flight attendant, and won the Best Supporting Actress award for her performance.

=== 2015–present: Breakthrough and mainstream success ===
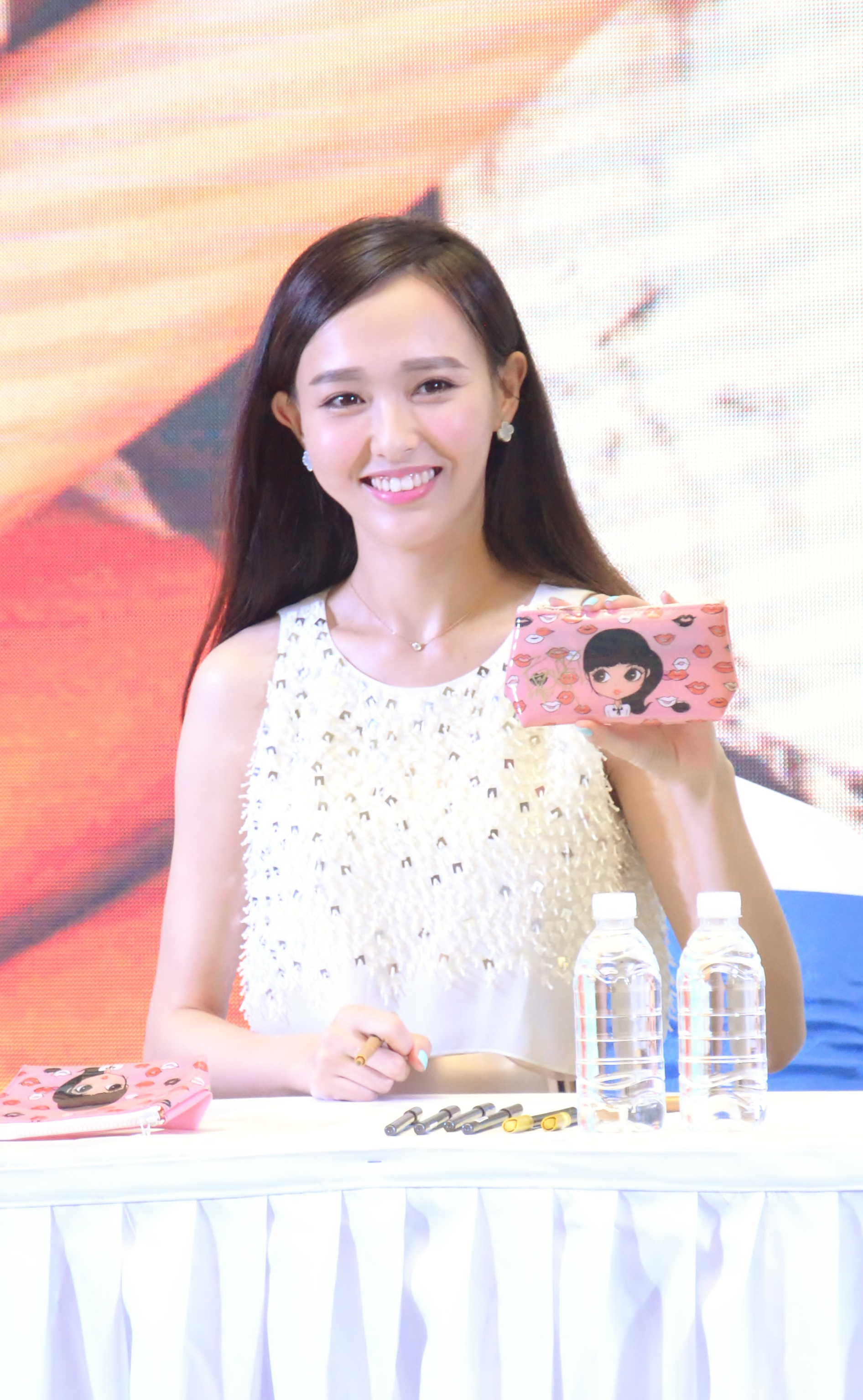
Tiffany Tang's function in Nanning, Guangxi, China on 8 June 2015

In 2015, Tang achieved breakthrough with starring roles in a series of hit dramas. In January, she starred in modern romance drama My Sunshine alongside Wallace Chung, based on the novel He Yi Sheng Xiao Mo by Gu Man. It was a major success, topping television ratings in its time slot and gained 10 million views online. She also starred in the period romance drama Lady & Liar alongside Hawick Lau, where she portrayed an acrobatics artist who transforms into a wealthy young mistress. Lady & Liar became the second highest rated drama for Jiangsu TV that year and broke 4 billion views online. In February, Tang starred alongside Li Yifeng in another period romance drama Legend of Fragrance as a perfumer. The drama was the highest rated drama for Hunan TV that year and broke the record for the highest ratings achieved in the first day of premiere. In June, Tang played the female lead A'ning in the popular tomb-raiding web drama The Lost Tomb, based on the novel Daomu Biji. The Lost Tomb is the most watched web drama of 2015 with over 2.8 billion views. In July, she starred in modern romance drama Diamond Lover with Rain, playing a jewelry designer. The drama was a commercial success with a peak rating of 1.249 and more than 3.3 billion views online Due to the success of her dramas, Tang was given the title of "1 billion queen" as all of her dramas have reached 1 billion views or more. She was nominated at the 17th Huading Awards for Best Actress in four different categories, and won Best Actress in the contemporary genre for her performance in My Sunshine. She also became the promotional ambassador for the 7th China TV Drama Awards, where she won the awards for Actress with the Most Media Influence as well as Audience's Favorite Character. That year, Tang was ranked 20th on Forbes China Celebrity with an income revenue of 45 million yuan. Tang was crowned "Golden Eagle Goddess" for the 11th China Golden Eagle TV Art Festival due to her successful streak in television. Despite her commercial success, Tang received criticism for being typecast as "silly, naive, sweet" characters.

In 2016, Tang starred in Korean-Chinese action film Bounty Hunters alongside Korean actor Lee Min-ho and Wallace Chung. The film broke 1 million admissions, and Tang received praise for her acting breakthrough as a femme fatale. She then starred in fantasy romance film A Chinese Odyssey Part Three directed by Jeffery Lau, playing the role of Zixia Fairy. The film was released on the mid-autumn festival and topped box office charts. Tang made her small-screen comeback in the historical drama The Princess Weiyoung, playing the titular role of Li Weiyoung. The drama was a huge success, topping both television and web ratings with over 2% and in its final episodes and garnering 18 billion views online; and also became one of the highest rated television dramas of 2016. Tang won the Best Actress award at the Huading Awards for her performance.

In 2017, Tang starred alongside Nicholas Tse and Jung Yong-hwa in the comedy film Cook Up a Storm.

In 2018, Tang starred in the youth inspirational drama The Way We Were. She also starred in the action thriller film Europe Raiders. On 12 June, Tang had her wax figure displayed at Madam Tussauds Shanghai.

In 2019, Tang starred in the romance drama See You Again alongside Shawn Dou. She reunited with Shawn Dou in the historical drama The Legend of Xiao Chuo, portraying the title character Xiao Yanyan.

In 2023, Tang starred in Blossoms Shanghai, the first TV series directed by Wong Kar-wai, which Tang had been working on for three years.

== Personal life ==
Tang dated actor Roy Chiu from 2010 to 2012.

Tang and actor Luo Jin announced their relationship on 6 December 2016, on her 33rd birthday. They were married in Vienna, Austria on 28 October 2018. In December 2019, Tang gave birth to a daughter.

In March 2021, Tang voiced her support for cotton produced in Xinjiang by reposting the state-run media's post on Weibo, a move replicated by most Chinese celebrities, after some international companies announced they would not purchase cotton from the region due to concerns over possible forced labor of Uyghurs.

== Filmography ==
=== Film ===
Year	English title	Chinese title	Role	Notes	Ref.
2007	Farewell for Love	离别也是爱	Hu Yan		
2007	Bullet & Brain	神枪手与智多星	Xiao Yu		
2007	Dangerous Games	棒子老虎鸡	Tang Tang		
2008	Dowry	嫁妆	Zhen Zhu		
2009	Qingchun Chuji 2 Shengsi Jiuzhu	青春出击2生死救助	Ying Jia		
2009	Looking for Jackie	寻找成龙	Swordswoman	Cameo	
2009	The Storm Warriors	风云II	Chu Chu		
2011	Preserve	保留	Tangtang		
2011	East Meets West 2011	东成西就2011	Ah Qiao	Cameo	
2012	Finding Love	逐爱之旅	Li Hui	Short film	
2014	For Love or Money	露水红颜	Ming Zhen		
2015	Chronicles of the Ghostly Tribe	九层妖塔	Cao Weiwei		
2016	MBA Partners	梦想合伙人	Gu Qiaoyin		
2016	Bounty Hunters	赏金猎人	Cat		
2016	A Chinese Odyssey Part Three	大话西游终结篇	Zixia		
2017	Cook Up a Storm	锋味江湖之决战食神	Hai Danmei		
2018	Europe Raiders	欧洲攻略	Miss Wang		
2018	Let Love Home	一墙之隔	Ye Xiaobin		

=== Television series ===
Year	English title	Chinese title	Role	Notes	Ref.
2007	Carol of Zhenguan	贞观长歌	Cai Ji		
2007	Spring Comes Early in Grassland	草原春来早	Hasi Gaowa		
2008	Modern Beauty	现代美女	Li Wei		
2009	Life Without Language	没有语言的生活	Zhu Ling		
2009	Born After 80	生于80后	An Wen		
2009	Legend of the Book's Tower	风满楼	Zhou Yutong		
2009	Chinese Paladin 3	仙剑奇侠传三	Zi Xuan		
2010	Pandamen	熊猫人	Li Liya		
2010	Lightning Marriage	闪婚	Han Jinbei		
2010	Dream to be Honorable 1942	梦想光荣1942	Zhao Dongmei		
2011	My Daughters	夏家三千金	Xia Tianmei		
2011	Unbeatable	无懈可击之高手如林	Tang Qiqi		
2011	Waking Love Up	爱情睡醒了	Liu Xiaobei		
2012	Xuan-Yuan Sword: Scar of Sky	轩辕剑之天之痕	Dugu Ningke		
2012	A Beauty in Troubled Times	乱世佳人	Zhang Lianxin		
2013	Agent X	X女特工	Zhong Li		
2013	Ad Mania	广告风云	Ruan Xinli		
2014	Perfect Couple	金玉良缘	Yu Qilin		
2014	The Lady in Cubicle	格子間女人	Tan Bin		
2015	My Sunshine	何以笙箫默	Zhao Mosheng		
2015	Lady & Liar	千金女贼	Jiang Xin		
2015	Legend of Fragrance	活色生香	Le Yan / An Ruohuan		
2015	Master of Destiny	风云天地	Tang Yiyi	Special appearance	
2015	The Lost Tomb	盗墓笔记	Ah Ning		
2015	Diamond Lover	克拉恋人	Mi Duo / Mi Meili		
2015	Woman on the Breadfruit Tree	长在面包树上的女人	Cheng Yun		
2015	Boys to Men	爸爸快长大	Elevator Beauty	Cameo	
2016	The Princess Weiyoung	锦绣未央	Li Weiyoung / Feng Xin'er		
2018	Hero's Dream	天意之秦天宝鉴	Nü Xi	Cameo	
2018	The Way We Were	归去来	Xiao Qing		
2019	See You Again	时间都知道	Shi Jian		
2020	The Legend of Xiao Chuo	燕云台	Xiao Yanyan		
2023	Blossoms Shanghai	繁花	Miss Wang		

=== Music video appearances ===
Year	Song Title		Singer	Notes/Ref.
2007	"Zhu Xian I Come Back"	诛仙我回来	Richie Jen	
2007	"Zhu Xian Love"	诛仙恋	Richie Jen	
2008	"Brothers"	兄弟	Huang Yue	
2009	"Diamond"	钻石	Qiao Renliang	
2009	"Do You Dare to Love"	敢不敢爱	Hu Ge	
2013	"I Don't Cry"	我不哭	Huang Yida	

== Discography ==
=== Albums ===
Year	English title	Chinese title	Notes/Ref.
2012	Candy Heart	糖心	

=== Singles ===
Year	English title	Chinese title	Album	Notes/Ref.
2009	"I Am Invisible"	我透明	Waking Love Up OST	
2010	"Love Attraction"	愛情引力	Pandamen OST	
2012	"Using a Lifetime to Reminisce"	用一生回憶	A Beauty in Troubled Times OST	
2012	"Hello Tomorrow"	明天,你好!	Finding Love OST	
2013	"Defending My Sunshine"	捍卫阳光	Agent X OST	
2014	"Sun and Rain"	晴雨	The Lady in Cubicle OST	
2014	"Searching for Him"	众里寻他	Tun Shi Cang Qiong OST	
2015	"Long Time No See"	好久不见	My Sunshine OST	
2015	"Tomorrow"	明天	Woman on the Breadfruit Tree OST	
2016	"Heavenly Gift"	天賦	The Princess Weiyoung OST	Duet with Luo Jin
2019	"I Want To Find You"	我想找你	See You Again OST	
2020	"Fearless"	无畏的模样	Charity song for Coronavirus	

== Awards and nominations ==
Major awards
Year	Award	Category	Nominated work	Result	Ref.
2007	10th Beijing College Student Film Festival	Best New Actress	Farewell for Love	Nominated	
2007	13th Shanghai Film Festival	Best Actress (Film)	Farewell for Love	Nominated	
2012	8th Huading Awards	Best Actress (Fantasy Drama)	Xuan-Yuan Sword: Scar of Sky	Nominated	
2014	13th Huading Awards	Best Actress (Revolution-Era Drama)	Agent X	Nominated	
2015	17th Huading Awards	Best Actress	My Sunshine	Nominated	
2015	17th Huading Awards	Best Actress (Contemporary Drama)	My Sunshine	Won	
2015	17th Huading Awards	Best Actress (Ancient Drama)	Perfect Couple	Nominated	
2015	17th Huading Awards	Best Actress (Revolution-Era Drama)	Legend of Fragrance	Nominated	
2015	3rd China International Film Festival London	Best Supporting Actress	For Love or Money	Won	
2016	8th Macau International Movie Festival	Best Actress	A Chinese Odyssey Part Three	Nominated	
2016	11th China Golden Eagle TV Art Festival	Golden Eagle Goddess	—N/a	Won	
2017	22nd Huading Awards	Best Actress	The Princess Weiyoung	Won	
2017	22nd Huading Awards	Top 10 Audience's Favorite TV Star	The Princess Weiyoung	Won	
2018	5th The Actors of China Award Ceremony	Best Actress (Emerald Category)	The Way We Were	Nominated	
2018	24th Huading Awards	Best Actress	The Way We Were	Nominated	
2019	6th The Actors of China Award Ceremony	Best Actress (Sapphire Category)	See You Again	Nominated	
2019	Golden Bud – The Fourth Network Film And Television Festival	Best Actress	See You Again	Nominated	
2020	7th The Actors of China Award Ceremony	Best Actress (Sapphire)	—N/a	Nominated	
2024	29th Shanghai Television Festival	Best Actress	Blossoms Shanghai	Nominated	
2024	34th Flying Apsaras Awards	Outstanding Actress	Blossoms Shanghai	Nominated	
2024	32nd China TV Golden Eagle Awards	Best Actress	Blossoms Shanghai	Nominated	
Others
2008	Forbes Celebrity List	Most Promising Newcomer	—N/a	Won	
2009	2nd Beijing TV Drama Awards	Most Popular Young Actress	Chinese Paladin 3	Won	
2011	1st LeTV Entertainment Awards	Most Popular TV Actress (Mainland China)	—N/a	Won	
2011	Grand Ceremony of New Forces	Most Popular TV Actress	—N/a	Won	
2011	Grazia Third Anniversary Award Ceremony	Trending New Force Award	—N/a	Won	
2011	3rd China TV Drama Awards	Most Popular Actress (Mainland China)	My Daughter	Won	
2012	iQiyi Award Ceremony	Most Popular Actress	Waking Love Up	Won	
2012	3rd LeTV Entertainment Awards	Most Popular TV Actress (Mainland China)	—N/a	Won	
2012	4th China TV Drama Awards	Media Recommended Actress	—N/a	Won	
2013	Asian Idol Awards	Most Popular Actress	Agent X	Won	
2013	8th BQ Celebrity Score Awards	Most Popular Actress	Agent X	Won	
2013	BQ Celebrity Commercial Value Ranking	Breakthrough Value Celebrity Award	—N/a	Won	
2013	5th China TV Drama Awards	Most Commercially Valuable Actress	—N/a	Won	
2014	5th China Student Television Festival	Most Popular Actress	Perfect Couple	Won	
2014	Wyndham Xingyue Role Model Ceremony	Most Appealing Actress	Perfect Couple	Won	
2014	6th China TV Drama Awards	Most Popular Couple (with Wallace Huo)	Perfect Couple	Won	
2015	LeEco Night	Most Popular Actress	My Sunshine	Won	
2015	7th China TV Drama Awards	Actress with the Most Media Appeal	—N/a	Won	
2015	7th China TV Drama Awards	Audience's Favorite Character	Diamond Lover	Won	
2016	Cosmo Beauty Ceremony	Most Influential Idol	—N/a	Won	
2016	Cosmo Fashion for Dream Award Ceremony	Dream Fashionable Figure	—N/a	Won	
2016	Dragon TV Entertainment Weekly	Top Ten Entertainment Industry Figures	—N/a	Won	
2016	Baidu Entertainment	Figure of the Year	—N/a	Won	
2016	10th Youku Young Choice Awards	Outstanding Performance of the Year	The Princess Weiyoung	Won	
2016	8th China TV Drama Awards	Most Popular Actress	The Princess Weiyoung	Won	
2017	Sohu Fashion Awards	TV Actress of the Year	The Princess Weiyoung	Won	
2017	Jinri Toutiao Award Ceremony	Most Anticipated Star	—N/a	Won	
2017	2nd China Quality Television Drama Ceremony	Most Marketable Actress	—N/a	Won	
2017	2nd China Quality Television Drama Ceremony	Media's Most Anticipated Actress	—N/a	Won	
2017	Tencent Entertainment White Paper	Outstanding Artist	—N/a	Won	
2017	11th Tencent Video Star Awards	All-Rounded Artist of the Year	—N/a	Won	
2017	Weibo Award Ceremony	Weibo Goddess	—N/a	Won	
2018	7th iQiyi All-Star Carnival	Best TV Actress	—N/a	Won	
2019	Weibo Award Ceremony	Weibo Goddess	—N/a	Won	
2019	4th China Quality Television Drama Ceremony	Quality Star of the Year	—N/a	Won	
2024	7th Television Series of China Quality Ceremony	Breakthrough Performance Drama Star of the Year	Blossoms Shanghai	Won	

=== Forbes China Celebrity 100 ===
Year	Rank	Ref.
2014	73rd	
2015	20th	
2017	14th	
2019	32nd	
2020	51st	
