= Bounty Hunters (2016 film) =

2016 Chinese-South Korean-Hong Kong film by Shin Tae-ra

- Chinese poster
- Traditional Chinese: 賞金獵人
- Simplified Chinese: 赏金猎人
- Literal meaning: Bounty Hunters
- Hanyu Pinyin: Shǎngjīnlièrén
- Hangul: 바운티 헌터스
- RR: Baunti heonteoseu
- MR: Paunt'i hŏnt'ŏsŭ
- Directed by: Shin Tae-ra
- Written by: Shin Tae-ra; Hwang Ja-hwan; Kim Kyu-won
- Produced by: Raymond Wong; Minnie Zhao; Ha Yeon-joo; Jang Young-hoon
- Starring: Lee Min-ho; Wallace Chung; Tiffany Tang; Jeremy Tsui; Karena Ng; Louis Fan
- Cinematography: Choi Joo-young
- Edited by: Yang Jin-mo
- Music by: Choi Seung-hyun
- Production companies: Shanghai Mingyi Media; Union Investment Partners; Shanghai Xinyi Media; Le Vision Pictures (Beijing); Le Vision Pictures (Hong Kong); Tianma Yinglian Entertainment (Beijing); Pegasus Motion Pictures Limited
- Distributed by: Le Vision Pictures (Beijing)
- Release date: July 1, 2016 (China)
- Running time: 105 minutes
- Countries: China; South Korea; Hong Kong
- Languages: Cantonese; Korean
- Box office: US$31.1 million

Bounty Hunters is a 2016 action comedy drama film directed by Shin Tae-ra and starring Lee Min-ho, Wallace Chung, Tiffany Tang, Jeremy Tsui, Karena Ng and Louis Fan. A Chinese-South Korean-Hong Kong co-production, the film was released in China by Le Vision Pictures on July 1, 2016.

== Plot ==
Martial arts expert Lee San and master sleuth Ayo were working as bodyguards-for-hire, but to little success. However, they were dismissed by Interpol officers a year ago. When a vague commission leads them to a hotel room in Incheon, South Korea, a terrorist bombing duly takes place and turns the bumbling investigators into fugitives. Their informant dies, but the pair also immediately find themselves pursued by a rival group of bounty hunters. After an exhilarating car chase, San and Yo join forces with a trio: Bossy heiress Kat on an anti-terrorist mission since her lost childhood Swan, who is the resident hacker and maker of fantastic gadgets, and the muscled Bao Bao. To clear their names, they must work with the trio to track down the culprit of a series of bombings that have plagued an international hotel group. After many hurdles, they manage to capture the bombers and the duo are proven innocent.

== Cast ==
- Lee Min-ho as Lee San
- Wallace Chung as Ayo
- Tiffany Tang as Kat
- Jeremy Jones Xu as Tommy
- Karena Ng as Swan
- Louis Fan as Bao Bao

== Reception ==
The film has grossed US$31.1 million.
