= The Tale of Rose =

Chinese television drama series

- Drama poster
- 玫瑰的故事
- Genre: Slice of life; Romance; Drama
- Based on: The Story of Rose by Yi Shu
- Written by: Li Xiao; Wang Si
- Directed by: Wang Jun
- Starring: Liu Yifei
- Country of origin: Mainland China
- Original language: Mandarin
- No. of episodes: 38

Production
- Executive producer: Chen Yinfei
- Production locations: Beijing, Shanghai
- Production companies: China Central Television; New Classics Media; Shanghai Tencent Penguin Film Culture Media Co., Ltd.

Original release
- Network: CCTV-8; Tencent Video
- Release: 8 June – 26 June 2024

The Tale of Rose (Chinese: 玫瑰的故事; pinyin: Méiguī de gùshì) is a Chinese television drama series based on the novel The Story of Rose by Yi Shu, directed by Wang Jun of A Little Reunion and With You, and co-written by Li Xiao of In Spite of the Strong Wind and My Sunshine, and Wang Si of The Player; the series stars Liu Yifei, Tong Dawei and Wan Qian, with special guest starring by Lin Gengxin and special starring by Wallace Huo. The plot tells the story of the heroine Huang Yimei's growth, career, and love from her teenage years to middle age.

It aired on CCTV-8 and Tencent Video on June 8, 2024. Two episodes are broadcast daily.

The series was broadcast simultaneously on Taiwan's WeTV and Hong Kong's myTV SUPER on the same day, with two episodes updated daily, with the first four episodes airing.

== Synopsis ==
Huang Yimei is the main character in The Tale of Rose, which chronicles her journey. Huang Yimei was born into a well-educated family and was raised in a safe environment. She showed artistic skill at a young age. As soon as she starts working, Huang Yimei becomes well-known and starts to feel something for her coworker Zhuang Guodong. They finally decide against being together though. After graduating, she weds Fang Xiewen, a classmate from her senior year. But as their paths diverge, they ultimately decide to be divorced. Huang Yimei starts her own business and develops into a skilled artist.

== Cast ==
=== Main Characters ===
Actors	Roles	Introduction
Liu Yifei	Huang Yimei (Rosie)	Born into a scholarly family, her parents are both professors at Tsinghua University, and she grew up in the care and love of her family. Huang Yimei graduated from the Central Academy of Fine Arts. She has a generous and free-spirited personality, is bold and careful in doing things, and never lacked suitors around her during her student days. Later, she divorced Fang Xiewen.
Tong Dawei	Huang Zhenhua	Huang Yimei's elder brother, with a gentle and elegant appearance, a gentle and considerate personality, and a good educational background, entered the architectural design institute after graduation and rose from a grassroots employee to a team leader with his rigor and foresight. Huang Zhenhua dotes on his younger sister Huang Yimei and is also Huang Yimei's reliable backer. He cannot bear to see his sister suffer any grievances in work or love.
Wan Qian (Juvenile: Su Mengdi)	Su Gengsheng	Huang Yimei's first workplace curatorial company "Qingting" is the director and also Huang Yimei's best friend. The damage caused by her original family in her youth made her sensitive, and defensive, but strong and independent. Huang Zhenhua was injured when he bought unused sports equipment from her, and the two became happy enemies. She also became Huang Zhenhua's fitness coach. In the process of getting along, they gradually developed a good impression and began to date.
Lin Gengxin	Fang Xiewen	Huang Yimei's senior when she was studying for a master's degree. He fell in love with Huang Yimei at first sight during the freshman orientation and actively pursued her. After graduation, the two got married and had children, but eventually divorced due to different development directions.
Wallace Huo	Fu Jiaming	An artist with a keen insight and understanding of art. Although he knew he was terminally ill due to congenital heart defect, he still infected everyone around him with his strength and optimism. Fu Jiaming met Huang Yimei in the last stage of his life and initially caused a wrong impression because of his intake of Sildenafil to treat such condition. The two soon discovered their common ground and fell in love and became each other's soul mates.
Peng Guanying	Zhuang Guodong	Huang Yimei's first boyfriend is a handsome, scholarly man with extraordinary taste. He had studied in France with excellent grades, entered a high-class company with his education, engaged in management with his ability, and negotiated several projects for the company with his charm, but there was no lack of women around him. Although he likes Huang Yimei, he loves his career more. He thought that Huang Yimei's appearance would make him choose his career firmly, but he didn't know that he had already messed up in his feelings, and finally, he decided to give up his feelings and choose his career.

=== Other characters ===
Actors	Roles	Introduction
Zhu Zhu	Jiang Xueqiong	The boss of the exhibition company "Qing Ting", the boss of Su Gengsheng and Huang Yimei.
Wu Bi	Zhou Shihui	Huang Zhenhua's colleague and good friend, he regretted his marriage to his fiancée on the spot when he registered his marriage because he fell in love with Huang Yimei.
Wang Mingyang	Fu Jiamin	
Huang Yi	Mimi	
Xia Lixin		Fang Xiewen's mother, Huang Yimei went to Shanghai to take care of the couple's daily life and diet after she became pregnant, and she had many complaints about Huang Yimei.
Yu Hui (Dubbing: Yang Jie)	Song Jiaqi	Zhuang Guodong's mother, who lives in Paris.
Yan Qingyu		Su Gengsheng's mother, who only asks Su Gengsheng for money and deceives herself about her husband's perverse activities.
Zhang Fan		Su Gengsheng's stepfather. He is a child molester who assaulted Su Gengsheng as a child.
Wan Guopeng	Xiaojie	Su Gengsheng's half-brother. He regrets not helping her when she was assaulted.
Wang Ziwei	Hu Lin	Claims to be Fang Xiewen's girlfriend and attacks Huang Yimei.
Liu Fang		Bai Xiaohe's mother.

=== Friendly performance ===
Actors	Roles	Introduction
Lan Yingying	Guan Zhizhi	Zhou Shihui's fiancée. The two broke up because Zhou Shihui fell in love with Huang Yimei.
Liu Jun	Zhuang Taiwan	Zhuang Guodong's father.
Gao Shuguang	Bai Erru	Bai Xiaohe's father, is a successful entrepreneur.
Qiu Xinzhi (voice: Ao Lei)	Lao Gu	Jiang Xueqiong's husband.
Jiang Xueming	Yuanzheng	Huang Zhenhua's colleague in the company.

=== Special Performance ===
Actors	Roles	Introduction
Lin Yi	He Xi	Pilot, Huang Yimei's younger boyfriend.
Chen Yao	Bai Xiaohe	Doctor of Chemistry, Huang Zhenhua's blind date, rejected Huang Zhenhua because she could not let go of her feelings for her ex-boyfriend.
Wu Yufang	Wu Yuejiang	Huang Yimei and Huang Zhenhua's mother, a professor at Tsinghua University.
Hou Changrong (voice: Ling Yun)	Huang Jianzhi	Huang Yimei and Huang Zhenhua's father, a professor at Tsinghua University.
Zhang Yue	Han Ying	Huang Yimei's colleague at "Qingting", has a crush on Zhuang Guodong.

== Production ==
On June 19, 2023, Tencent Video, New Classics Media announced the participating actors and the first poster.
