= Battle of Changsha (TV series) =

2014 Chinese TV series

- Battle Of Changsha Drama Series Poster
- 战长沙
- Genre: War; Drama; Romance
- Written by: Que Que
- Directed by: Kong Sheng; Zhang Kaizhou
- Starring: Wallace Huo; Yang Zi; Ren Chengwei; Zuo Xiaoqing
- Ending theme: I Will Remember You (我会记得你) by Wallace Huo & Yang Zi
- Country of origin: China
- Original language: Mandarin
- No. of seasons: 1
- No. of episodes: 32

Production
- Producer: Hou Hongliang
- Production companies: Shandong Television Media Group; Daylight Entertainment Television Ltd

Original release
- Network: CCTV-8
- Release: 14 July – 31 July 2014

Battle of Changsha (Chinese: 战长沙) is a 2014 Chinese television series produced by Hou Hongliang and directed by Kong Sheng. The story is set against the backdrop of the Battle of Changsha in 1939 during World War II. Starring Wallace Huo and Yang Zi, the series premiered on CCTV-8 on 14 July ended its run on 31 July 2014.

The series was a critical success, and was the highest rated drama on major streaming website Douban.

== Synopsis ==
Battle of Changsha tells a story about an ordinary family in Changsha, Hunan Province, China, coping with the Anti-Japanese war between 1938 and 1945, reflecting Chinese people's lives during that ill-fated period.

With the Japanese air-raid and students’ protest as the background, the drama begins with the narration of Hu Xiangxiang, a 16-year-old high school student, spoiled but innocent and inner-directed girl who is running away from a blind date set up by her brother-in-law, Xue Junshan, who's arranging to marry her off, then leave Changsha to avoid the war there. Besides, Hu Xiangxiang's family also want to find an escape to protect her twin brother, Hu Xiangjiang (also known as Xiao Man). The person for the blind date is Gu Qingming, a senior Kuomintang (KMT) strategy adviser of the battle who is totally different from those people who want to stay away from the war. He is eager to fight against the Japanese even though his family, especially his father is strongly against him to go into the battle instead of going abroad to save his life.

They didn't start off on good terms and Xue Junshan had to pick another man as the fiancé for Hu Xiangxiang. In the meantime, then Chinese president Chiang Kai-shek demanded a scorched-earth policy in an attempt to stop the Japanese from advancing, but the policy went terribly wrong. As a result, the whole city was burnt to ashes even before the Japanese troops’ intruding. Approximately 30,000 of people were burned to death in their sleep including Xiangxiang's fiancé and family.

Hu Xiangxiang is still fairly ignorant about what a war is really like and all she wants to do is escape. However, during the times of war, the 16-year-old girl is forced to grow up quickly. After seeing a series of deaths of family members and killings carried out by Japanese troops, Xiangxiang and Xiao Man get themselves involved into the war. She chose to be a nurse in order to save lives as much as possible. They are also deeply touched by the constant help from Gu Qingming whenever needed and his passion to save the country. The romance between Xiangxiang and Gu Qingming blossoms in the most chaotic time of China.

== Cast ==
=== Main ===
- Wallace Huo as Gu Qingming (Gu Shaohuan)

A senior Kuomintang (KMT) strategy adviser attached to the 50th Division. He holds the rank of Major.

- Yang Zi as Hu Xiangxiang

Daughter of a tailoress. Gu Qingming's wife.

=== Supporting ===
==== Hu Family members ====
- Wang Caiping as Grandmother Hu

Hu Changning's mother. A skilled tailor.

- Yang Xinming as Hu Changning

Xiangjun, Xiangjiang and Xiangxiang's father. A courageous and humble intellectual.

- Mu Liyan as Liu Duoci

Xiangjun, Xiangjiang and Xiangxiang's mother. A tailor trained by Grandma Hu.

- Niu Junfeng as Hu Xiangjiang (Xiaoman)

Xiangxiang's twin brother.

- Liu Zhenjun as Liu Xiuxiu

Liu Duoci's niece, Minghan's younger sister.

- Gao Xin as Liu Minghan

Liu Duoci's nephew, Xiuxiu's older brother. Hu Xiangjun's cousin and former boyfriend.

- Ren Chengwei as Xue Junshan

Hu Xiangjun's husband. He is a corrupt security officer, who uses his connections to make a profit. He holds the rank of captain, but wears the rank insignia of a lieutenant.

- Zuo Xiaoqing as Hu Xiangjun

Xiangxiang's older sister.

- Ying Yixuan as Xue Ping'an

Junshan and Xiangjun's son.

- Wang Yongquan as Hu Bingquan
- Wang Hong as Hu Xiaoqiu

Hu Bingquan's adopted son.

- Sun Mengjia as Shuilan
- Li Zefeng as Hu Xiangping
- Zhang Moxi as Jingyan
- Zhang Yijie as Hu Xiangshui

==== Gu Family ====
- Wang Shuangbao as Xu Quan

Qingming's uncle, Junshan's superior.

- Lu Xia as Gu Qinyun

Qingming's older sister.

==== Others ====
- Kuang Muye as Little Brother Mo (Su Tie)

Junshan's sidekick, aide, later Qingming's aide.

- Ma Bo as Chen Chu (Xiao Hei)

Junshan's sidekick, later a spy for the Japanese.

- Li Wenjing as Mu Huarong (Xiao Mu)

Qingming's aide.

- Li Peiming as Fang Xianjue

Commander of the Tenth Corps of the Kuomintang.

- Ying Zi as Jin Feng

Xiangxiang's classmate, Xiaoman's crush.

- Sun Hanwen as Sheng Chengzhi

Xiangxiang's betrothed.

== Ratings ==
- Highest ratings are marked in red, lowest ratings are marked in blue

CCTV-8 CSM50 city ratings
Air date	Episode	Ratings (%)	Audience share (%)
July 14, 2014	1	0.57	2.1
July 14, 2014	2	0.78	2.27
July 14, 2014	3	0.95	2.58
July 14, 2014	4	0.91	2.93
July 15, 2014	5	0.46	1.71
July 15, 2014	6	0.81	2.36
July 15, 2014	7	0.87	2.35
July 15, 2014	8	0.88	2.81
July 16, 2014	9-12	0.812	2.386
July 17, 2014	13-16	0.879	2.539
July 21, 2014	30	0.83	2.39
July 21, 2014	31	0.95	2.58
July 21, 2014	32	1.03	3.39
Average	-	0.86	-
