= At the Dolphin Bay =

2003 Taiwanese drama

- 海豚灣戀人 / 海豚湾恋人
- Genre: Melodrama, and Romantic comedy less, Slice of Life
- Directed by: Lin He Long
- Starring: Angela Zhang; Ambrose Hsu; Wallace Huo; Penny Lin; Jill Hsu
- Opening theme: I Don't Want to Know by Chen Wei
- Ending theme: Yi Shi De Mei Hao by Angela Zhang
- Country of origin: Taiwan
- Original languages: Mandarin; English
- No. of episodes: 28

Production
- Producer: Chun Yu San

Original release
- Network: SETTV, SCTV and RCTI
- Release: 2003

At the Dolphin Bay is a Taiwanese drama that stars Angela Zhang, Ambrose Hsu, Wallace Huo, Jill Hsu and Penny Lin. The drama aired in 2003 on SETTV.

== Plot ==
Legend has it a dolphin once helped to reunite a pair of tragic lovers. From then on, the much loved animal became the guardian of love. At Dolphin Bay, a tale of love and myth continues.

Two children, Ze Ya and Xiao Pin Gai, met at an orphanage. Seeing the latter was often bullied by the other kids, Ze Ya rose to the occasion to become her gallant protector. Alas, the young couple parted ways when the director of a big company Hsu Ruogu arrived to bring his ‘grandson’ home. Ze Ya promised to come back for Xiao Pin Gai but as he was returning a few days later, Xiao Pin Gai was already leaving the orphanage with her new adoptive mother. He returns again 20 years later to fulfill his promise, but his childhood friend is nowhere to be found.

At Dolphin Bay, Ze Ya meets a young woman named Yi Tian Bian. Her strong and optimistic character draws him to her, and Tianbian is touched by all that Ze Ya does for her. Tian Bian is actually Xiao Pin Gai, Ze Ya's good friend back at the orphanage. Just like Ze Ya, Tian Bian was adopted by her current mother. Ze Ya who was adopted by the Hsu family is currently an important leader in the company, SET. He lived with his grandfather, his step-mother and his half-sister, Shan-Ni.

While Ze Ya lived in a well-to-do family, Tian Bian and her mother were frequently harassed by a loan shark to pay back the money they borrowed from them. Touched by Tian Bian's determination, Ze Ya helped Tian Bian to attend a singing audition to select new talent in SET. Upon listening to Tian Bian's singing, the music director Hsiao Kang instantly liked her voice and decided she will be SET's new voice for SkyWalk project, much to the dismay of SET's current singer, Chen Man Qing. Being Hsiao Kang's lover during their working period, she viewed Tian Bian as a rival and vowed to challenge her.

While working together, attraction blossoms between Ze Ya and Tian Bian. However, Ze Ya soon found out that Tian Bian was the real child his grandfather was looking for in the orphanage. Realizing that he had robbed Tian Bian the opportunity of having the life he shouldn't, Ze Ya made a deal with the grandfather to marry Shan-Ni in return of acknowledging Tian Bian as his granddaughter. The situation was further complicated when Hsiao Kang fell for Tian Bian and Man Qing became unreasonably jealous of this relationship. When Shan-Ni agreed to a fake marriage with Ze Ya, she actually fell in love with him and asked him to love her instead. As Ze Ya realized he could only love Tian Bian, they found out Shan-Ni suffered from leukemia and had less than a year to live. He finally agreed to marry Shan-Ni out of pity while Tian Bian decided to try loving Hsiao Kang who had helped her a lot.

Meanwhile, Skywalk project ran into a dead end when Man Qing decided to use all resources and her promotion to deprive Skywalk from being covered by media and public. Tianbian's single slumped in the market and was scoring low for the season. Hsiao Kang did not give up and tried his best to support Tian Bian out of his love to her to the extent that he mortgaged his house to finance the album promotion. Luck turned to their sides when two foreigners who watched their performance in the street were actually two executives of internationally renowned perfume looking for brand ambassador in Taiwan. Tian Bian was signed up for the advertisement and soon, her album picked up the market.

The fact that they looked like Tian Bian and Ze Ya had decided to live separate lives improved Tian Bian's relationship with Hsu family. She even grew closer to Shan-Ni and really took her as an elder sister. Realizing that Tian Bian was also his granddaughter, the grandfather grew warmer and acknowledged her fully. They even came as a family to support Tian Bian's concert. In this concert, Hsiao Kang finally realized he did not want to lose Man Qing and they rekindled their romance. During the concert, Shan-Ni collapsed and was in critical condition. She finally died in Ze Ya's arms after asking him to find happiness.

A few years later, Ze Ya was seen as the top leader in SET interviewed by a foreign journalist. Tian Bian was coming back after a worldwide concert tour. She visited the old orphanage where she met Ze Ya for the first time. She received a purple shell sent by Hsiao Kang to the orphanage. Apparently, Ze Ya received another purple shell and was also heading to the orphanage at the same time. As she is walking away, they pass each other. Although Ze Ya does not see her, he realizes it and asks for the car to stop. When he calls out to her with the name Xiao Pin Gai, Tian Bian turns around and runs into his arms. They hug and then share a kiss.

== Cast ==
- Angela Zhang as Yi Tian Bian/Xiao Pin Gai
- Ambrose Hui as Xu Ze Ya
- Wallace Huo as Zhong Xiao Gang
- Jill Hsu as Chen Man Qing
- Penny Lin as Xu Shan Ni
- Liang Xiu Shen as Xu Ruo Gu
- Ge Wei Ru as Xiang Li Hong
- Linda Liu as Li Hui Lan
- Deric Wan as Eddy
- Chen Yi Rong

== Remake ==
It was remade in Indonesia as Kau Masih Kekasihku, starring Asmirandah as Aulia (Yi Tian Bian), Arifin Putra as Kevin (Xu Ze Ya), and Baim Wong as Axel (Zhong Xiao Gang).
