= Perfect Couple (TV series) =

- Genre: Romantic comedy Historical fiction
- Created by: Tong Hua
- Written by: Tong Hua; Gan Lian; Jin Yuanyuan
- Directed by: Huang Zuquan
- Starring: Wallace Huo; Tiffany Tang; Huang Ming; Angela Gong
- Opening theme: Good Times by Della Ding & Wallace Huo
- Ending theme: Perfect Couple by Li Qi
- Country of origin: China
- Original language: Mandarin
- No. of episodes: 45

Production
- Executive producers: Tang Panjing; Yu Yi; Lian Junjie
- Producers: Tang Panjing; Wallace Huo
- Running time: 45 minutes
- Production companies: Xing Sheng Di Movie & Television Culture Co., Ltd; Huajae Studio

Original release
- Network: Jiangsu TV, Shenzhen TV
- Release: 21 April – 7 May 2014

Perfect Couple (Chinese: 金玉良缘; pinyin: Jīnyù Liángyuán) is a 2014 Chinese television series starring Wallace Huo and Tiffany Tang. This is the first television series produced by Wallace Huo's Huaje Studio. Filming started in April 2013, and ended in July 2013. The series started aired on Jiangsu TV and Shenzhen TV from 21 April to 7 May 2014.

== Synopsis ==
During the Ming Dynasty, Yu Qi Ling (Tiffany Tang) heads to the capital with only her adoptive mother's belongings to find her mother's biological son. She encounters Jin Yuan Bao (Wallace Huo), a rich young master who works at the Detective Bureau and was on a case of capturing a man - the thief that Yu Qi Ling was chasing. It turns out that the thief was part of a kidnapping ring, and it led the protagonists to the Thousand Beauties Chamber where Chu Chu, the supposed leader was.

Meanwhile, the Empress Dowager has bestowed a marriage between Jin Yuan Bao and Jiang Xiao Xuan to prevent the Second Prince from usurping the throne from the Crowned Prince. When Jin Yuan Bao's intended bride runs away before the night of the wedding, Yu Qi Ling assumes Jiang Xiao Xuan's identity and marries into the Jin family.

Upon realizing that Jin Yuan Bao was indeed her adoptive mother's biological son, she schemes to reunite him with her mother. However, she runs into many obstacles as she cannot reveal that she and Jiang Xiao Xuan had switched identities. This leads to many misunderstandings and many quarrels between Jin Yuan Bao and Yu Qi Ling.

At the same time, Jin Yuan Bao's cousin, Liu Wen Chao, plans multiple assassination attempts on Jin Yuan Bao's life because he has desires of rising up and owning the Jin Manor and was conspiring with the Second Prince. He strangles Jiang Xiao Xuan's maid, Xi Er, to death because she found out about their scheming during Madam Jin's birthday. He plants his own spies in the Bureau of Weaponry so he would one day take control once he gets rid of Jin Yuan Bao. He desires Yu Qi Ling although she is his cousin's wife. Eventually, he finds out about the identity switch between Yu Qi Ling and Jiang Xiao Xuanand Jin Yuan Bao's true origins, and made use of this to torture the protagonists and their families.

When the Empress Dowager learns that the Jin family and Yu Qi Ling has committed lese-majesty, she jails them. However, she knows that the Second Prince and Liu Wen Chao were in cahoots, so she had Jin Yuan Bao investigate the truth. With the truth and evidence, the two villains did not stand a chance.

== Cast ==
=== Main ===
Actor	Role	Description
Wallace Huo	Jin Yuan Bao	The spoilt young master of the Jin Family, and number one detective in the province.
Tiffany Tang	Yu Qi Ling	An adopted orphan, who is highly skilled in martial arts. In order to help her adoptive mother find her son, she encounters Jin Yuan Bao and marries into the Jin Family.
Huang Ming	Gu Chang Feng	Jin Yuan Bao's good friend, a cute and bubbly man. A physician who is earnest at his job, but lacks the ability for it.
Angela Gong	Jiang Xiao Xuan	The young mistress of Jiang family, who was bestowed to Jin Yuan Bao. However, she runs away from the marriage. She ends up meeting and falling in love with Gu Chang Feng.

=== Supporting ===
Actor	Role	Description
Wang Yang	Liu Wen Chao	Jin Yuan Bao's cousin, head housekeeper of Jin Family. An ambitious man who aspires to restore the Liu Family. He colludes on many occasions with the Second Prince to cause the marriage between the Jin and Jiang family to fail so that they can both rise to power. However, his many attempts on Jin Yuan Bao's life continuously fail, angering the Prince. He initially plans to harm Yu Qi Ling, Jin Yuan Bao's wife, but he later falls in love with her due to her caring nature.
Vivian Wu	Liu Ruyue (Madam Jin)	Jin Yuan Bao's adoptive mother. She wants Jin Yuan Bao to take over the family business, the Bureau of Weaponry.
Wendy Wang	Liu Qian Qian	Liu Wen Chao's younger sister. She likes Jin Yuan Bao. She was accidentally killed by her brother when she protected Jin Yuan Bao from his wrath.
Zhang Tianyang	Fu Wang	Second Prince. He wants to rebel and usurp the throne.
Fan Haolun	Ah Gui	Jin Family's head guard. Liu Wen Chao's right-hand man. When he was caught in one of the schemes, he purposely blamed Madam Jin for ordering him to do so. In the end, he committed suicide so that Liu Wen Chao would not be implicated with kidnapping and murder.
Zhou Xiaoli	Wang Huilan	Jin Yuan Bao's birth mother and Yu Qi Ling's adoptive mother. She was killed by Liu Wen Chao.
Dai Changjiang	Wen Qiang	Jin Yuan Bao's right-hand man.
Zhang Renbo	Ma Zhong	Jin Yuan Bao's right-hand man.
Bo Hong	Lady Gu	Gu Chang Feng's mother, Madam Jin's maid. She knows the truth about Jin Yuan Bao's birth.
Zheng Long	Ah Fu	Jin Yuan Bao's underling. He is the comic relief in the series.
Xiang Dong	Xi'er	Jiang Xiao Xuan's maid. She was murdered by the Second Prince and Liu Wenchao after being caught for overhearing their collusion. Her body was later found under the lotus pond.
Tao Huimin	Empress Dowager	Madam Liu's aunt.

== Soundtrack ==
Title	Singer
Good Times (好時光)	Wallace Huo & Della Ding
Perfect Couple (金玉良緣)	Li Qi
Perfect Couple (金玉良緣)	Jia Qing
Phoenix (鳳凰)	Alan
Vega (織女星)	Shin
Obsessed (癡)	Wang Andi

== Ratings ==
CSM50 City premiere ratings
Air date	Episode	Jiangsu Satellite TV			Shenzhen Satellite TV		
Air date	Episode	Ratings (%)	Audience share (%)	Rank	Ratings (%)	Audience share (%)	Rank
2014.04.21	1-3	0.793	2.18	5	0.469	1.28	13
2014.04.22	4-6	0.658	1.83	7	0.454	1.26	11
2014.04.23	7-9	0.748	2.09	6	0.494	1.38	9
2014.04.24	10-12	0.678	1.88	6	0.464	1.28	10
2014.04.25	13-15	0.822	2.22	5	0.419	1.13	15
2014.04.26	16-17	0.824	2.21	5	0.362	0.97	17
2014.04.27	18-19	0.771	2.09	5	0.435	1.18	11
2014.04.28	20-22	0.737	2.06	7	0.400	1.12	15
2014.04.29	23-25	0.721	2.02	7	0.411	1.15	16
2014.04.30	26-28	0.853	2.35	5	0.498	1.37	10
2014.05.01	29-31	0.716	2.09	5	0.492	1.45	10
2014.05.02	32-34	0.722	2.07	5	0.438	1.27	16
2014.05.03	35-36	0.726	1.96	4	0.387	1.05	13
2014.05.04	37-38	0.837	2.29	5	0.541	1.49	11
2014.05.05	39-41	0.886	2.50	3	0.544	1.52	10
2014.05.06	42-44	0.944	2.64	3	0.539	1.50	11
2014.05.07	45	0.902	2.58	5	0.699	1.93	10
Total		13.338	37.06	-	8.046	22.33	-
Average		0.785	2.18	-	0.473	1.314	-

- Highest ratings are marked in red, lowest ratings are marked in blue

== Awards and nominations ==
Year	Award	Category	Nominee	Result	Ref.
2014	5th China Student Television Festival	Most Anticipated Historical Drama		Won	
2014	5th China Student Television Festival	Most Popular Actor	Wallace Huo	Won	
2014	5th China Student Television Festival	Most Popular Actress	Tiffany Tang	Won	
2014	iQiyi All-star Carnival	Chinese Drama of the Year		Won	
2014	6th China TV Drama Awards	Most Popular Actor (Hong Kong/Taiwan)	Wallace Huo	Won	
2014	6th China TV Drama Awards	Most Popular Couple	Wallace Huo & Tiffany Tang	Won	

== International broadcast ==
Date	Country	Channel	Notes
June 6, 2014	United States	KSCI	
July 9, 2014	Canada	Talentvision	
August 12, 2014	Taiwan	CTV	
September 8, 2014	Malaysia	Astro	
October 16, 2014	Taiwan	CTi TV	
November 27, 2014	Japan	NOTTV1	
January 31, 2015	Hong Kong	Drama Channel	
October 27, 2015	South Korea	AsiaN	
May 21, 2015	Japan	Asia Dramatic TV	
October 5, 2015	Taiwan	TTV Main Channel	
February 3, 2016	Thailand	Thairath TV	
April 6, 2016	Malaysia	8TV	
December 8, 2021	Vietnam	SCTV Asia Top Series	
