= Cook Up a Storm =

2017 film directed by Raymond Yip

- Theatrical release poster
- Directed by: Raymond Yip
- Written by: Manfred Wong; Liu Yi; Hana Li
- Produced by: Mani Fok; Manfred Wong
- Starring: Nicholas Tse; Jung Yong-hwa; Ge You; Tiffany Tang; Michelle Bai; Anthony Wong
- Cinematography: Yip Shiu-kei
- Edited by: Shirley Yip; Yu Hongchao
- Music by: Alex San; Chan Kwong-wing
- Production companies: Emperor Motion Pictures; Wanda Pictures
- Distributed by: Emperor Motion Pictures
- Release date: 10 February 2017
- Countries: Hong Kong; China
- Languages: Mandarin; Cantonese; Korean; English; Russian
- Budget: CN¥250 million
- Box office: CN¥121.9 million (China); US$18.1 million (worldwide)

Cook Up a Storm (Chinese: 决战食神) is a 2017 culinary drama film directed by Raymond Yip and starring Nicholas Tse, Jung Yong-hwa, Ge You, Tiffany Tang, Michelle Bai, and Anthony Wong. A Hong Kong-Chinese co-production, it was released in China on 10 February 2017.

== Plot ==
Sky Ko is a talented chef who runs Seven, the popular restaurant in the Spring Avenue alongside his close manager Uni and his three close assistants including Rice Ball, Er Yong, and San Mao. Tensions arise when the nearby Li Management Group opens Stellar, the high-end restaurant led by Paul Ahn, a French-trained, three-star Michelin chef from South Korea, who initially harbors a strong prejudice against Chinese cuisine. However, after a striking knife-skills duel between Sky and Paul, Paul realizes his shortcomings and sends his assistant and partner, Mayo, to deliver an invitation to Seven to mend fences. When Sky and Uni visit Stellar to experience its avant-garde menu, a clash in culinary philosophies sparks another cooking duel centered on beef, ending in a stalemate that prompts both chefs to settle their rivalry at an upcoming professional cooking competition.

During the preliminary rounds of the competition, Paul prepares a gourmet foie gras with caramel sauce, while Sky presents his elaborate "universe duck". Although both dishes receive high praise, Sky narrowly loses due to lower presentation scores. Shortly after, Paul discovers that the tournament results were manipulated by the Li to clear a path for Mayo to enter the international stage in his place. Paul also learns that he has lost his sense of taste earlier and has been betrayed by both Mayo and business investor Li Jiacong for personal ambition.

Bonding over their shared past disappointments, Paul and Sky decide to set aside their differences and team up for the global culinary championship, while Paul officially cuts ties with the Li. The international contest brings together elite chefs from around the world, including Mayo, who competes under the corporate backing of the group. Utilizing a creative fusion of East and West, which highlighted by an innovative stone-mill technique to craft mapo tofu, Sky and Paul secure a well-deserved victory, leaving Mayo with a disappointing defeat. According to the tournament rules, only one representative can advance to the grand finale to face Mountain Ko, the current culinary God, Paul graciously steps aside to let Sky take his place.

In the final showdown, Mountain quickly demonstrates his mastery with a flawless sugar candy creation, while Sky prepares a traditional bowl of noodles. Instead of presenting the dish to the judges, Sky brings the bowl directly to Mountain, who is revealed to be his estranged biological father that abandoned him years ago for his career. The comforting bowl of noodles evokes powerful childhood memories, thus breaking down emotional barriers and allowing both Sky and Mountain to reconcile their long-standing grievances. The film concludes warmly as Seven thrives once again during the Lunar New Year, with Sky, his staff, and the local community celebrating together and sharing wishes of peace and prosperity.

== Cast ==
- Nicholas Tse as Sky Ko
- Jung Yong-hwa as Paul Ahn
- Tiffany Tang as Uni
- Michelle Bai as Mayo
- Ge You as Seven
- Anthony Wong as Mountain Ko
- Wang Taili as Li Jiacong
- Ocean Hai as Er Yong
- Du Haitao as Rice Ball
- Liu Xianda as San Mao
- Jim Chim as Da Weiwang
- Michelle Wai as Lin Zishan

== Box office ==
The film grossed a total of CN¥121.911 million (US$18.04 million) in mainland China. Overseas, the film grossed US$44,148 in Australia, and US$18,373 in the United Kingdom, New Zealand, and South Korea, for a worldwide total of US$18,102,521.

== See also ==
- The God of Cookery (1996), a Stephen Chow film
