= 100% Senorita =

- "100% Senorita" promo poster
- Also known as: Qian Jin Bai Fen Bai; Twin Sisters: 100% Senorita
- 千金百分百
- Genre: Romance, Drama, Comedy
- Written by: Zheng Wen Hua; Wang Qi Sheng; Lin Jiu Yu; Luo Cai Juan
- Directed by: Shen Yi; Long Guan Wu; Zhou Xiao Peng
- Starring: Joe Chen; Penny Lin; Wallace Huo; Deric Wan
- Opening theme: "Map Of Happiness 幸福的地圖" by Elva Hsiao
- Ending theme: "Disguise 偽裝" by Lene Marlin 琳恩瑪蓮
- Country of origin: Taiwan
- Original language: Mandarin
- No. of episodes: 40

Production
- Producer: Chen Yu Shan
- Production location: Taiwan
- Running time: 60 minutes (CTS); 90 minutes (SETTV)
- Production companies: Machi Production; Sanlih E-Television

Original release
- Network: CTS; SETTV; SCTV (Indonesia)
- Release: 13 November 2003 – 6 January 2004

100% Senorita (Chinese: 千金百分百; pinyin: Qian Jin Bai Fen Bai, Also Called as 'Twins') is a 2003 Taiwanese romance comedy drama television series. Starring Joe Chen, Penny Lin, and Wallace Huo as the main leads, also Deric Wan and Jason Hsu in supporting roles, the drama began broadcasting on CTS channel on September 13, 2003 and finished on January 6, 2004 with 40 episodes total. The drama was re-broadcast every following Saturday on Sanlih's SETTV with a 90-minute version of the drama.

== Synopsis ==
When a surrogate mother gives birth to twins, she keeps Liang Xiao Feng (Chen Qiao En) by her side, and gives Zhuang Fei Yang (Penny Lin) away, who ends up in a wealthy family. Years later, Zhuang Fei Yang becomes the heiress of Formosa Inc, a company created by her father and Peter works as General Manager. However, when Fei Yang's father passes away, Peter tries to kill Fei Yang and take the company for his own. Despite Peter's attempts, Fei Yang miraculously survive from the accident and saved by a cosmetic surgeon who mistakenly thought she is his daughter. The surgeon does the cosmetic surgery on Fei Yang to reconstruct her face that being damaged by the accident. From then on, the twins’ fates entwine once more.

== Cast ==
=== Main cast ===
- Joe Chen as Liang Xiao Feng/Zhuang Fei Yang(before Craniofacial surgery)

20 years old, speaks what is on her mind, relaxed and straightforward attitude. Those that come close to her would be influenced by her youthfulness and vitality. Although her appearance seems to be rough and tough and sometimes, even have blank expressions but she would do anything for her family. Her spirit of sacrificing for the family would make people feel touched. She would always show her lively and bright side to people and keep her sorrows and tears silently to herself.

- Penny Lin as Zhuang Fei Yang(after Craniofacial surgery)

20 years old, rich family's daughter, high education level, beautiful and excellent temperament. Because her father had an accident, he left behind a tremendous business for her to be in charge of. However, as she fell for her lover's poisonous trap, her face was damaged. With nowhere to go, she gets mixed together with a group of youngsters "Snatching Money Clan." Never thought that it was here that she found herself, found freedom, and also true love.

- Penny Lin as Miss Zhou(Photo's cameo)

Zhou Rong Bo's dead daughter

- Wallace Huo as Li Wei Xiang

25 years old, head of Zhu Luo Ji.com Enterprise, very handsome, un-matchable personality. Always acting ruthless and cold but actually, it is so that he can conceal the scar that is within him, He was originally a gifted student in the law department. He was recruited at a young age and became a celebrity lawyer. However, when his father, who was a judge, tells Wei Xiang that years ago, because of a wrong sentence, it snatched away an innocent life, broke up a family, he adopted a young child that was left behind --- which turns out to be him. Wei Xiang was not able to accept this shock and for this reason, he left the Judge, gave up everything and started a life of banishing himself.

- Deric Wan as Pan Bi De "Peter"

27 years old, general manager of "Fu Er Mo Sha" Enterprise, young with a bright future, handsome and easy-going, regards himself as very high/tall. His romance and numerous feelings is enough to confuse everybody. His steady management is enough to gain people's trust and have the power and authority within his hands. Yet he has a young wound that no one knows about which causes the deepest part of his heart to possess a side of dim evilness. In order to reach his goal, he would get to it by any means that he can with ruthlessness and without a care for anyone at all.

- Jason Hsu as Meng Zhe Lin

22 years old, is Bi De's special assistant, has always had a secret crush on Fei Yang. Yet, never mind about telling her his feelings, ordinarily, there isn't even a chance for him to get close to her. To him, Fei Yang is a distant dream. Yet, when Xiao Feng appears as a substitute of Fei Yang, the situation changes around completely. His love sickness finally comes true and becomes Fei Yang's (who is actually Xiao Feng) protector by her side.

=== Supporting cast ===
- Jason Tang as Ma Ji
- Ke Yi Rou as Ba Bi
- Liu Guang Yuan as Pa Zi
- Joyce Chao as Feng Xiao Chen
- Chiang Tsu-ping as Chen Sha Sha
- Liao Jun as Hong Bo
- Ke Shu Qin as Yang Zhu Fang
- Michael Huang as President Chou

== Indonesian remake ==
In 2007, an Indonesian remake of the show titled Putri Kembar (Twin Princesses) aired on RCTI, starring Stefanie Hariadi Theresia as Chika (Liang Xiao Feng), Richa Novisha as Sasha (Zhuang Fei Yang), and Roger Danuarta (Li Wei Xiang).
