= Yida Huang =

Singaporean singer and songwriter

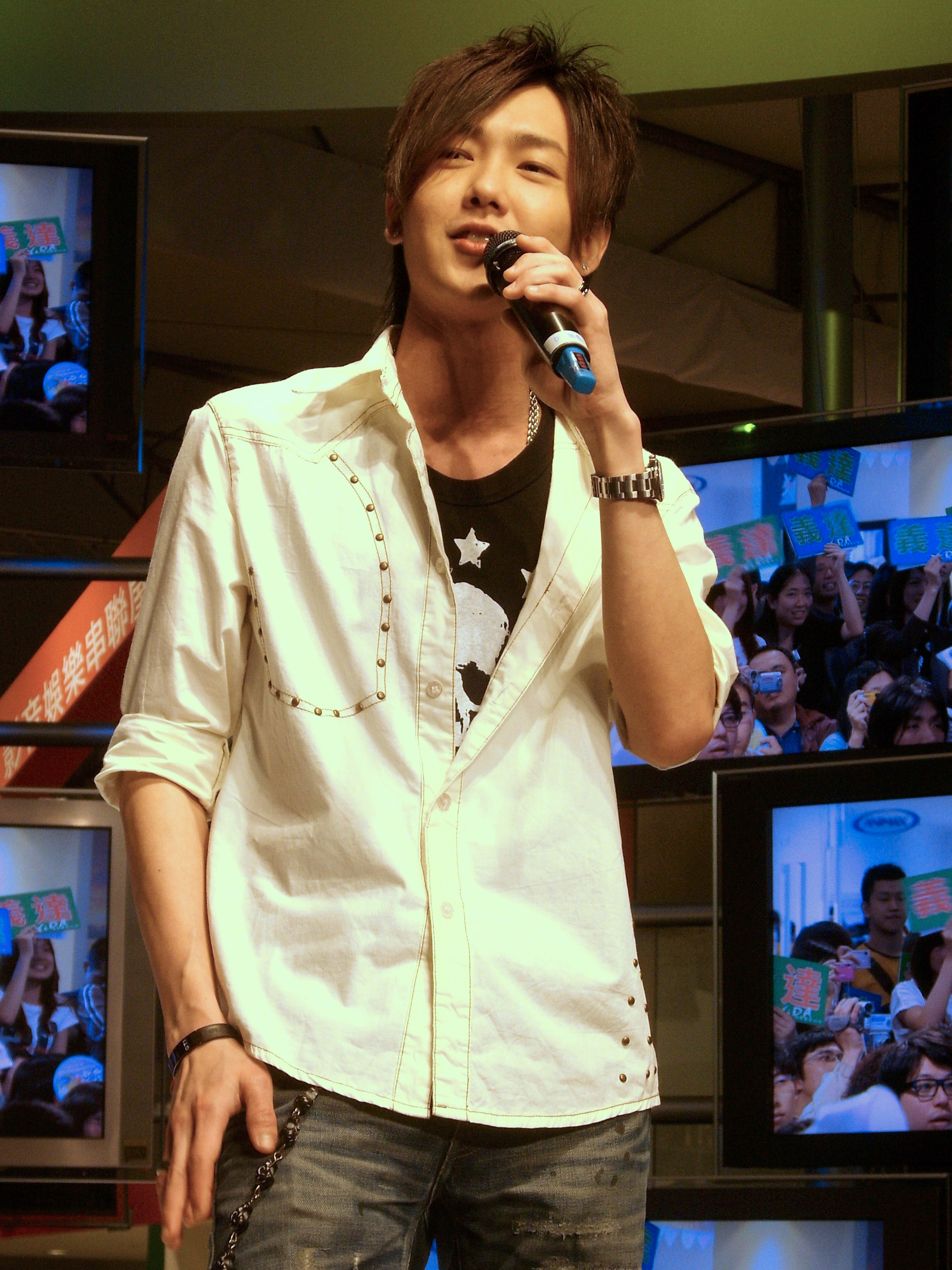
- Huang in 2008

Background information
- Born: 11 August 1979 (age 47); Singapore
- Genres: Mandopop, rock, indie, ambient
- Occupations: Singer, songwriter, producer
- Instruments: Guitar, piano, vocals, drums
- Years active: 2004–present
- Website: huangyida.net

Yida Huang (simplified Chinese: 黄义达; traditional Chinese: 黃義達; pinyin: Huáng Yìdá; born 11 August 1979) is a Singaporean singer and songwriter. The capitalization of his birth name is Yida Huang, as the previous form of "YiDA" was used as a logo by Sony Music Taiwan. He has since stopped using the "YiDA" name form upon the end of his contract with the company. He has released four major albums with Sony Taiwan. His song "Chou Nan Ren" (Jerk) was the opening theme for the Taiwanese drama Devil Beside You. Another song of his, "Set Me Free", was the theme song for the Chinese version of the movie Stealth. He graduated from the Lee Wei Song School of Music.

His long-awaited fourth album Dedicated to Myself (寫给自己的歌) was officially released on November 28, 2008.

On April 21, 2011, seven years after his first album, Huang released the EP "微光" under the music company 北京橙天华音音乐制作有限公司 which he signed to after his contract ended with Sony Taiwan.The album consisted of 5 tracks including one instrumental track "track 11" which was also featured in a fashion show by fashion designer Marie showcasing her You.kai collection.

Along with his new EP "微光", a music film was also produced by the same music company featuring his EP tracks in the film. Starring Yida Huang and Tang Yan, the film centers around Yida Huang's various mystery encounters with Tang Yan although he has no recollections of her.

After a hiatus, Huang returned to the music scene, appearing as a participant in the second season of the popular Chinese reality TV singing competition show Call Me by Fire in 2022.

== Discography ==
=== Studio albums ===
- 無法定義 (Undefinable) (2004)
- 專屬密碼 (Exclusive Code) (2005)
- 完整演出 (The Grand Finale) (2007)
- 寫給自己的歌 (Dedicated to Myself) (2008)
- 過程-精選(2CD+1DVD) (YiDA's Journey – Best Collection) (2009)
- 微光EP(Glimmer of Light) (2011)
- Heart Disk (2013)

=== Singles ===
- 寶藏 performed the theme song for Disney animated version of the movie (Taiwan region) "星银岛 Treasure Planet" (2002)
- 地下鐵 "Subway" – theme song for Hong Kong romance film Sound of Colors (2003)
- 臭男人 "Jerk" – opening theme for the Taiwanese TV drama, "Devil Beside You."
- Set Me Free (a collaboration with Karen Mok) – Chinese theme song for the movie "Stealth."
- Nocturne (performed by Kousuke Atari) – Japanese commercial song for movie, "Lust, Caution" by Ang Lee
- 要正常愛 Music Arrangement for movie "女人不壞" by Tsui Hark
- Set Me Free II Rio Fashion Week 2009 – Marie Tchibi

=== Notable compositions ===
- 一九九幾的他 – 彭佳慧
- 我不是英雄 – 陳宇凡
- 漸漸 – 趙薇
- 順風逆風 – 趙薇
- 上一次下一次 – 謝霆鋒
- 飛天 – 陳依依
- 再一次 – 秦海璐
- 虛擬世界 – 秦海璐
- 恋爱新手 – BOBO
- 怎么爱 – BOBO
- 幸福在路上 – 黃弈
- Complicated – 周蕙
- 1到10 = 我和你 – 范玮琪
- 和你在一起 – 乔任梁
- 阴天气球 – 乔任梁

=== Notable concerts ===
- 紅樓 Ximending, Taipei, Taiwan，義鳴驚人萬人連署演唱會(August 14, 2005)

== Filmography ==
=== Television series ===
- Star Boulevard (星光大道)

=== Variety and reality show ===
- 2022: Call Me by Fire (season 2) (披荊斬棘)

=== Music film ===
- 保留 (preserve) featuring Tiffany Tang, produced by 北京橙天华音音乐制作有限公司
