= The Royal Swordsmen =

2005 Chinese-Taiwanese-Hong Kong TV series

- Poster
- 天下第一
- Genre: Wuxia
- Screenplay by: Wong Jing; Lin Qiang
- Directed by: Deng Yancheng; Wei Liyuan
- Presented by: Yang Teng-kui; Lin Zheng; Zhang Xiaowu
- Starring: Roger Kwok; Li Yapeng; Wallace Huo; Michelle Ye; Damian Lau; Tammy Chen; Gao Yuanyuan; Eva Huang
- Opening theme: "Your Number One" (你的第一) by Wallace Huo
- Ending theme: "A Reason to Think About Me" (想我的理由) by Jeff Chang
- Composers: Mak Chun Hung; Luo Jian
- Countries of origin: China; Taiwan; Hong Kong
- Original language: Mandarin
- No. of episodes: 35 (Taiwanese version); 40 (Chinese version)

Production
- Producers: Wong Jing; Wang Dapeng; Chen Beibei; Huang Jinmei; Chen Jingxia
- Production location: China
- Camera setup: Huang Boxian; Chen Xitai
- Running time: ≈45 minutes per episode
- Production companies: Jing's Production; First Media Corporation

Original release
- Network: CTS (Taiwan); BTV (China); SZMG (China); SuperSun (Hong Kong); TVB Jade (Hong Kong)

The Royal Swordsmen (天下第一; literally Number One Under Heaven) is a 2005 wuxia television series directed by Deng Yancheng and Wei Liyuan. A mainland Chinese, Taiwanese and Hong Kong co-production, it starred an ensemble cast from all three regions including Roger Kwok, Li Yapeng, Wallace Huo, Michelle Ye, Damian Lau, Tammy Chen, Gao Yuanyuan, and Eva Huang. Set in 17th-century China during the Ming dynasty, it follows four martial artists who are recruited to serve as elite secret service agents dedicated to protecting the emperor. It was first shown on Shenzhen Media Group's Drama Channel on 30 January 2005.

== Synopsis ==
The series is set in 17th-century China during the Ming dynasty. Zhu Wushi, the Emperor's uncle, had received an order from the previous emperor to set up a secret service to protect the monarchy. One of the most formidable martial artists in the jianghu himself, Zhu has recruited four elite agents who are known by their code names: "Heaven One", "Mysterious One", "Earth One", and "Yellow One".

"Heaven One" is the calm and cool-headed Duan Tianya, who was raised by Zhu as his godson and sent to Japan to learn ninjutsu from the Iga School. While he was in Japan, he had a romantic relationship with Yukihime, a daughter of Yagyū Tajima-no-Kami, the patriarch of the influential Yagyū clan. He also met Nemuri Kyōshirō and learnt kenjutsu from him. However, he became an enemy of the Yagyū clan after taking revenge against Yukihime's brother, who had murdered Nemuri. Torn between her family and her lover, Yukihime ultimately sacrificed herself to prevent her father from killing Duan in a duel. Years later, Duan encounters Yukihime's sister and starts a romantic relationship with her, drawing him into another conflict with the Yagyū clan.

"Mysterious One" is the beautiful and intelligent Shangguan Haitang, who is well-versed in various skills and arts, including medicine and astronomy. Like Duan, she was raised by Zhu as his goddaughter and trained by him in martial arts. She is in charge of an organisation made up of experts who are considered "Number Ones" in their respective trades, fields, and professions. Through the organisation, she helps her godfather gather intelligence and scout for talents to join the secret service.

"Earth One" is the cold and aloof Guihai Yidao, whose swordsmanship is unparalleled. He desires to avenge his murdered father and sees it as his purpose in life. In his quest for vengeance, he masters a powerful but highly perverse skill, and finds himself falling under its evil influence — to the point where he loses control of himself and starts to indiscriminately kill anyone who tries to stop him. He has also been secretly in love with Shangguan for many years but does not have the courage to confess his feelings to her.

"Yellow One" is the streetwise Cheng Shifei, who used to be a gambler, thief, and confidence trickster. By chance, he encounters a dying Gu Santong, Zhu's rival who had lost to Zhu in a duel and has been imprisoned for many years. Before his death, Gu transfers to Cheng all his neigong and knowledge of martial arts – including a skill that allows him to temporarily turn his body into impenetrable metal – in the hope that Cheng will help him fulfil his wish of defeating Zhu. Cheng also incidentally meets the Emperor's sister, Princess Yunluo, and marries her eventually.

The secret service has an ongoing political rivalry with the Eastern Depot, another imperial spy agency led by the eunuch Cao Zhengchun. The Emperor knows that Zhu and Cao are equally influential in politics, so he has been pitting them against each other in order to prevent either side from gaining too much power. The four agents help Zhu counter Cao's machinations on one hand, and perform their duties by protecting the Emperor from domestic and foreign threats on the other hand.

Zhu ultimately defeats and eliminates Cao, becoming the single, most powerful figure in the imperial court. At this point, he finally reveals his true colours. All these years, he has been secretly plotting an elaborate scheme to usurp the throne from the Emperor, and he is now in the best position to do so; the four agents are merely his pawns. In the end, the three surviving agents combine forces to defeat their treacherous master and save the Emperor.

== Cast ==
- Roger Kwok as Cheng Shifei
- Li Yapeng as Duan Tianya / Takizawa Ichirō
- Wallace Huo as Guihai Yidao
- Michelle Ye as Shangguan Haitang
  - Gui Yun as Shangguan Haitang (child)
- Damian Lau as Zhu Wushi
- Tammy Chen as Princess Yunluo
- Gao Yuanyuan as Yagyū Hyōjo
  - Liu Sisi as Yagyū Hyōjo (child)
- Eva Huang as Yagyū Yukihime
- Kurata Yasuaki as Yagyū Tajima-no-Kami
- Zhang Yapeng as Yagyū Jūbei
- Dicky Cheung as Gu Santong
- Deng Chao as the Emperor
- Monica Chan as Suxin
- Kent Tong as Wan Sanqian
- Adam Chen as Kobayashi Masa / Lin Xiaoquan
- Li Jianyi as Cao Zhengchun
- Lynn Poh as Xiaonu
- Zuki Lee as Princess Lixiu
- Tang Qun as the Empress Dowager
- Tan Jianchang as Zhang Jinjiu
- Lu Yong as Wuwan
- Hu Ronghua as Zhang Laosan
- Chen Fu as Li Tianhao
- Yang Shu as Li Zhengkai
- Zhang Lei as Guihai Bailian
- Tong Tong as Lu Huanong
- Niu Guanzhong as Tiezhao Feiying
- Yao Jianming as Eunuch Sun
- Ye Qing as Cheng Huan

== Production ==
Shooting for The Royal Swordsmen started on 22 March 2004 in Wuxi, and wrapped up on 21 June in the same year.

== Broadcasts ==
The series was first aired in mainland China on Shenzhen Media Group's Drama Channel on 30 January 2005. It started airing on 14 February 2005 on CTS Main Channel in Taiwan, and on 25 October 2006 on TVB in Hong Kong.
