= List of Chinese television programs by date =

The following is a list of Chinese television programs by date of first broadcast in China.

== 1970s ==
=== 1978 ===
- 1 January - Xinwen Lianbo

== 1980s ==
=== 1983 ===
- 12 February - CCTV New Year's Gala
- Outlaws of the Marsh

=== 1984 ===
- Black Cat Detective

=== 1985 ===
- Ji Gong
- Zhuge Liang

=== 1986 ===
- 1 October - Journey to the West

=== 1987 ===
- Calabash Brothers
- Dream of the Red Chamber

== 1990s ==
=== 1990 ===
- Kewang
- Tang Ming Huang
- The Investiture of the Gods

=== 1991 ===
- The Three Heroes and Five Gallants

=== 1993 ===
- I Love My Family

=== 1994 ===
- The Book and the Sword
- Romance of the Three Kingdoms

=== 1995 ===
- 9 January - Sinful Debt
- The Blue Mouse and the Big Faced Cat
- Wu Zetian

=== 1996 ===
- 16 March - Tell It Like It Is
- A Romance in Shanghai

=== 1997 ===
- 7 July - Happy Camp
- A Sentimental Story

=== 1998 ===
- January - The Water Margin
- 1 June - Approaching Science
- December - Shangguan Wan'er
- A Date with Luyu
- Han Liu Bang
- My Fair Princess

=== 1999 ===
- 8 October - 3000 Whys of Blue Cat
- The Eloquent Ji Xiaolan
- Yongzheng Dynasty

== 2000s ==
=== 2000 ===
- 30 March - Palace of Desire
- 10 July - The Taiping Heavenly Kingdom
- Sun Zi Bing Fa Yu San Shi Liu Ji
- Sunny Piggy

=== 2001 ===
- June - Master Swordsman Lu Xiaofeng
- June - Master Swordsman Lu Xiaofeng 2
- 9 July - Lecture Room
- December - Kangxi Dynasty
- The Prince of Han Dynasty
- Huo Yuanjia
- Into the Shangri-La
- Jingwu Yingxiong Chen Zhen
- Laughing in the Wind
- Legendary Fighter: Yang's Heroine
- Li Wei the Magistrate
- Love Legend of the Tang Dynasty
- Music Up
- Romance in the Rain
- Qin Shi Huang

=== 2002 ===
- 1 January - Ode to Gallantry
- 1 January - World Film Report
- 2 December - The Great Qing Empire
- 25 December - The Heaven Sword and Dragon Saber
- GG Bond
- Love Through Different Times
- Only You
- Qianlong Dynasty
- Shaolin King of Martial Arts
- Sky Lovers
- The Young Wong Fei Hung
- Drunken Hero
- Book and Sword, Gratitude and Revenge

=== 2003 ===
- 20 March - The Story of a Noble Family
- April - Towards the Republic
- 12 August - A Leaf in the Storm
- 18 September - Flying Daggers
- 20 September - High Flying Songs of Tang Dynasty
- 23 September - The Imperfect Sculpture
- 22 December - Demi-Gods and Semi-Devils
- Affair of Half a Lifetime
- The Affaire in the Swing Age
- Boy & Girl
- Eternity: A Chinese Ghost Story
- The Legend of the Condor Heroes
- My Fair Princess III
- The Showroom Tales
- The Story of Han Dynasty
- Travelogue
- Xiaozhuang Mishi
- The Story of Han Dynasty

=== 2004 ===
- 6 May - Super Girl
- 1 July - Lian Cheng Jue
- 6 August - Amazing Detective Di Renjie
- 10 October - The Legend of Guan Gong
- Assassinator Jing Ke
- Genghis Khan
- Jin Mao Xiang
- Li Wei the Magistrate II
- Ma Dashuai
- Magic Touch of Fate
- The Proud Twins
- Warriors of the Yang Clan
- Amor de Tarapaca
- Huang Taizi Mishi

=== 2005 ===
- 2 January - The Emperor in Han Dynasty
- 30 January - The Royal Swordsmen
- 31 January - Chinese Paladin
- 12 February - Home with Kids
- August - Pleasant Goat and Big Big Wolf
- August - How Much Sorrow Do You Have
- 4 October - Lotus Lantern
- 5 October - Trail of the Everlasting Hero
- 23 October - Moment in Peking
- 16 December - The Dragon Heroes
- The 100th Bride
- The Dreaming Girl
- Li Wei Resigns from Office
- The Little Fairy
- Lost City in Snow Heaven
- The Prince of Qin, Li Shimin
- The River Flows Eastwards
- SkyEye
- Taizu Mishi
- Magic Touch of Fate

=== 2006 ===
- 9 January - The Lucky Stars
- 13 February - Qiao's Grand Courtyard
- 17 March - The Return of the Condor Heroes
- 26 March - Sigh of His Highness
- 28 March - To Live to Love
- March - Seven Swordsmen
- 9 May - Sound of Colors
- 10 May - Century Sonny
- 2 July - Paris Sonata
- 16 August - Fast Track Love
- 30 August - Princess Der Ling
- 4 September - Da Qing Fengyun
- 31 October - The Great Dunhuang
- 22 September - Chuanqi Huangdi Zhu Yuanzhang
- 26 September - The Young Warriors
- 30 September - Emerald on the Roof
- 18 November - Interviews Before Execution
- 20 November - Amazing Detective Di Renjie 2
- 24 December - Soldiers Sortie
- 29 November - Secret History of Kangxi
- December - The Rise of the Tang Empire
- The Adventures of Little Carp
- How Much Sorrow Do You Have
- Eight Charts
- Eight Heroes
- Founding Emperor of Ming Dynasty
- Go Player
- Initiating Prosperity
- Silent Tears
- Star Boulevard
- Tortoise Hanba's Stories
- Wanderings of Sanmao
- Wu Zi Bei Ge
- Romance of Red Dust

=== 2007 ===
- 10 January - The Great Revival
- 10 January - The Legend of Lu Xiaofeng
- 25 January - Shanghai Bund
- 27 January - Carol of Zhenguan
- 1 February - Sword Stained with Royal Blood
- February - The Legend and the Hero
- 17 May - Struggle
- 25 May - Super Boy
- 25 June - Love at First Fight
- 13 July - Thank You for Having Loved Me
- 5 August - The Shadow of Empress Wu
- 18 August - Da Tang Fu Rong Yuan
- 29 September - Who Wants to Be a Millionaire?
- 26 October - Beautiful Life
- 7 December - The Legend of Chu Liuxiang
- 11 December - Ming Dynasty
- Butterfly Lovers
- King Qian in Wuyue
- The Legend of Qin
- Ming Dynasty in 1566
- The Olympic Adventures of Fuwa
- The Rebirth of a King
- The Fairies of Liaozhai

=== 2008 ===
- 13 January - China's Next Top Model
- 22 February - The Last Princess
- 5 March - 1 vs. 100
- 15 March - Amazing Detective Di Renjie 3
- 3 April - Ren Bishi
- 5 May - Royal Tramp
- May - A Mobile Love Story
- 18 July - The Legend of the Condor Heroes
- 24 July - Paladins in Troubled Times
- 4 August - Day Day Up
- 12 October - The Legend of Bruce Lee
- 3 November - The Shaolin Warriors
- 6 November - Taiwan 1895
- 15 November - Ai Chang Cai Hui Ying
- Modern Lady

=== 2009 ===
- 12 January - Dali Princess
- 22 January - Rose Martial World
- 26 January - Stage of Youth
- 31 January - The Legend and the Hero 2
- 5 March - My Chief and My Regiment
- 14 March - Love in a Fallen City
- 20 March - The Book and the Sword
- 12 April - My Youthfulness
- 14 April - Prelude of Lotus Lantern
- 1 May - I'm a Boss
- 2 June - The Road We Have Taken
- 28 June - Chinese Paladin 3
- 13 July - Nonstop
- 20 July - Love in Sun Moon Lake
- 22 July - Justice Bao
- 26 July - In That Distant Place
- 8 August - Meteor Shower
- 23 August - IPartment
- 6 October - Ancestral Temple
- 23 October - The Heaven Sword and Dragon Saber
- 30 November - Baike Quan Shuo
- December - Bing Sheng
- December- The Qin Empire
- Dwelling Narrowness
- Zheng He Xia Xiyang
- Lurk

== 2010s ==
=== 2010 ===
- 2 January - The Myth
- 10 January - Sinful Debt 2
- 14 February - Journey to the West
- 10 March - The Patriotic Knights
- 15 March - Beauty's Rival in Palace
- 24 March - Run Daddy Run
- 3 April - Will You Marry Me and My Family
- 2 May - Three Kingdoms
- 27 May - Huang Yanpei
- 4 June - The Girl in Blue
- July - Wu Cheng'en and Journey to the West
- 14 August - A Weaver on the Horizon
- 15 August - Ancient Legends
- 17 September - Single Princesses and Blind Dates
- 6 July - The Dream of Red Mansions
- 10 October - Happy Mother-in-Law, Pretty Daughter-in-Law
- 27 December - The Legend of Crazy Monk
- Mad Detective Di Renjie
- Justice Bao

=== 2011 ===
- 1 January - The Vigilantes in Masks
- 2 January - Kong Que Ling
- 31 January - Palace
- 2 February - Melody of Youth
- 9 February - Sunny Happiness
- 3 March - Painted Skin
- 4 May - All Men Are Brothers
- 16 July - New My Fair Princess
- 28 July - Journey to the West
- 8 August - Twin of Brothers
- 27 September - 1911 Revolution
- 21 October - Beauty World
- 5 November - Secret History of Empress Wu
- 10 September - Scarlet Heart
- 30 September - The Glamorous Imperial Concubine
- 17 November - Ad Mania
- 17 November - Empresses in the Palace
- 17 December - The Han Triumph
- The Holy Pearl
- Unruly Qiao
- Invincible Knights Errant

=== 2012 ===
- 8 January - Beijing Love Story
- 20 January - Palace 2
- 27 March - Secret History of Princess Taiping
- 14 May - A Bite of China
- 14 June - The Legend of Chu Liuxiang
- 6 July - Xuan-Yuan Sword: Scar of Sky
- 8 August - The Bachelor
- 27 August - When Love Walked In
- 14 September - The Bride with White Hair
- 3 November - Drama Go! Go! Go!
- 28 December - King's War
- 31 December - Mazu
- The Queen of SOP
- Su Dongpo

=== 2013 ===
- 14 January - Heroes in Sui and Tang Dynasties
- 6 February - Swordsman
- 24 February - Ip Man
- 5 May - Legend of Lu Zhen
- 4 July - The Patriot Yue Fei
- 13 July - The Legend of Chasing Fish
- 6 August - Flowers in Fog
- 14 August - Prince of Lan Ling
- 24 August - Women of the Tang Dynasty
- 14 September - La ma zheng zhuan (Hot mom)
- 11 October - Where Are We Going, Dad?
- 23 October - Fiancee
- 27 October - 2 Days & 1 Night
- 3 December - Heroes of Sui and Tang Dynasties
- 20 November - Best Time
- 22 December - The Demi-Gods and Semi-Devils
- 25 December - Mao Zedong
- Destiny by Love
- See Without Looking
- Sleek Rat, the Challenger
- The Qin Empire II: Alliance

=== 2014 ===
- 5 January - Cao Cao
- 28 January - Heroes of Sui and Tang Dynasties
- 31 January - The Investiture of the Gods
- 7 April - Palace 3
- 21 April - Perfect Couple
- 22 April - Scarlet Heart 2
- 24 April - Dad is Back
- 3 June - Young Sherlock
- 23 June - Loving, Never Forgetting
- 23 June - One and a Half Summer
- 2 July - Swords of Legends
- 6 July - Go, Single Lady
- 7 July - Boss & Me
- 14 July - Battle of Changsha
- 10 August - Love at Second Sight
- August - Deng Xiaoping at History's Crossroads
- 8 September - Marriage Cuisine
- 1 October - Sound of the Desert
- 10 October - Hurry Up, Brother
- 17 October - The Amazing Race China
- 17 October - Grade One
- 12 November - Top Gear
- 3 December - The Romance of the Condor Heroes
- 20 December - The Deer and the Cauldron
- 21 December - The Empress of China
- 25 December - Monopoly Exposure
- Red Sorghum
- Moment in Peking
- The Stand-In

=== 2015 ===
- 10 January - My Sunshine
- 28 January - Lady & Liar
- 4 February - Legend of Fragrance
- 15 February - Love Weaves Through a Millennium
- 19 February - Where Are We Going, Dad? 2
- 3 March - Cruel Romance
- 15 March - Sisters Over Flowers
- 17 March - The Four
- 21 March - I Supermodel
- 25 April - Divas Hit the Road
- 1 May - Takes a Real Man
- 3 May - Tiger Mom
- 9 June - The Journey of Flower
- 6 July - Wu Xin: The Monster Killer
- 12 June - The Lost Tomb
- 14 June - Go Fighting!
- 22 July - Diamond Lover
- 24 July - Real Hero
- 1 August - Up Idol
- 31 August - The Disguiser
- 13 September - Love Yunge from the Desert
- 19 September - Nirvana in Fire
- 21 September - Challenger's Alliance
- 22 September - Legend of Zu Mountain
- 15 October - Love Me If You Dare
- 6 November - Run for Time
- 29 November - The Substitute
- 30 November - The Legend of Mi Yue
- 3 December - Go Fridge
- 6 December - Infinite Challenge
- December - Go Princess Go

=== 2016 ===
- 11 January - Mad About You
- 22 January - Twenty-Four Hours
- 29 January - Addicted
- 1 February - Chronicle of Life
- 1 February - Rocket of China
- 8 February - Legend of Nine Tails Fox
- 13 February - The Imperial Doctress
- 17 February - The Three Heroes and Five Gallants
- 27 March - Who's the Murderer
- 3 April - God of War, Zhao Yun
- 18 April - Ode to Joy
- 24 April - My Amazing Boyfriend
- 27 April - Magical Space-time
- 23 May - Chinese Paladin 5
- 24 May - Dear Translator
- 31 May - To Be a Better Man
- 19 June - Heroes of Remix
- 20 June - The Mystic Nine
- 25 June - The Legend of Beggar King and Big Foot Queen
- 8 July - The Amazing Race China 3
- 15 July - Sing! China
- 20 July - Novoland: The Castle in the Sky
- 20 July - The Whirlwind Girl 2
- 21 July - Singing All Along
- 24 July - Ice Fantasy
- 31 July - Noble Aspirations
- 22 August - Just One Smile Is Very Alluring
- 18 September - Mask Singer
- 20 September - Housing
- 24 October - When a Snail Falls in Love
- October - Medical Examiner Dr. Qin
- November 7 - P. King Duckling
- 11 November - The Princess Weiyoung
- 11 December - Stay with Me
- 21 November - Number One Surprise
- 8 December - Noble Aspirations 2
- 19 December - Candle in the Tomb
- Angel Wings
- Bloodivores
- Cheating Craft
- Fresh Sunday

=== 2017 ===
- 2 January - Pretty Li Hui Zhen
- 3 January - General and I
- 9 January - The Legend of the Condor Heroes
- 12 January - Chōyū Sekai
- 21 January - Singer2017
- 30 January - Eternal Love
- 6 February - The Starry Night, The Starry Sea
- 8 March - Ice Fantasy Destiny
- 27 March - Stitch & Ai
- 28 March In the Name of People
- 1 April - The Silver Guardian
- 14 April - Surgeons
- 17 April - Fighter of the Destiny
- 24 April - Operation Love
- 11 May - Ode to Joy 2
- 5 June - Princess Agents
- July - A Life Time Love
- July - Lost Love in Times
- The Qin Empire III
- 18 December Nirvana in Fire 2

=== 2018 ===
- January King of Bots
- 27 April Marx Got It Right
- 14 August - The Rise of Phoenixes
- 20 August - Ruyi's Royal Love in the Palace

=== 2019 ===
The Untamed

== Upcoming ==
- Tribes and Empires: Storm of Prophecy
- Rush to the Dead Summer
- Xuan-Yuan Sword Legend: The Clouds of Han
- The Weasel Grave
- Liang Sheng, Can We Not Be Sad
- Only Side by Side with You

== See also ==
- List of Chinese television series
- List of Japanese television programs by date
