= List of Chinese television series =

This is a list of Chinese television series by genre. For a chronological list, see List of Chinese television programs by date.

== Modern drama (现代剧) ==
=== Action (动作) / Adventure (探险) ===
- The Lost Tomb (2015)
- The Mystic Nine (2016)
- Candle in the Tomb (2016)
- Candle in the Tomb: Mu Ye Gui Shi (2017)
- The Golden Eyes (2018)

=== Comedy (喜剧) ===
- I Love My Family (1993)
- Home with Kids (2005)
- Nonstop (2009)
- iPartment (2009)
- Surprise (2013)
- Mad About You (2016)

=== Crime (犯罪) / Procedural (侦探) / Suspense (悬疑) ===
- A Sentimental Story (1997)
- Monopoly Exposure (2014)
- Love Me If You Dare (2015)
- Memory Lost (2016)
- When a Snail Falls in Love (2016)
- Medical Examiner Dr. Qin (2016)
- Yu Zui (2016)
- Burning Ice (2017)
- Day and Night (2017)
- Age of Legends (2018)
- Love Journey (2019)
- Dancing in the Storm (2019)
- The Bad Kids (2020)
- Crime Crackdown (2021)
- Imperfect Victim (2023)
- The Knockout (2023)
- The Long Season (2023)
- Justifiable Defense (2025)

=== Drama (戏剧) / Family (家庭) / Slice-of-life (生活) ===
- Ke Wang (1990)
- Sinful Debt (1995)
- Silent Tears (2006)
- Struggle (2007)
- Beautiful Life (2007)
- Thank You for Having Loved Me (2007)
- My Youthfulness (2009)
- Stage of Youth (2009)
- I'm a Boss (2009)
- The Big Life (2010)
- Will You Marry Me and My Family (2010)
- Run Daddy Run (2010)
- Sinful Debt 2 (2010)
- Melody of Youth (2011)
- The Bachelor (2012)
- Marriage Cuisine (2014)
- Tiger Mom (2015)
- Ode to Joy (2016)
- To Be a Better Man (2016)
- Housing (2016)
- In the Name of People (2017)
- Midnight Diner (2017)
- The First Half of My Life (2017)
- Dear My Friends (2017)
- Mother's Life (2018)
- All Is Well (2019)
- The World Between Us (2019)
- Nothing But Thirty (2020)
- Go Ahead (2020)
- The Bond (2021)
- New Generation (2021)
- Meet Yourself (2023)
- To the Wonder (2024)
- The Best Thing (2025)
- Love Between Lines (2026)

=== Fantasy (玄幻) / Science fiction (科幻) ===
- Magic Touch of Fate (2005)
- Love Weaves Through a Millennium (2015)
- My Amazing Boyfriend (2016)
- The Starry Night, The Starry Sea (2017)
- Moonshine and Valentine (2018)
- Sweet Dreams (2018)
- Lie to Love (2021)
- Reset (2022)
- Three-Body (2023)
- Mobius (2025)
- My Page in the 90s (2026)

=== Romance (言情) ===
- Old House Has Joy (1998)
- Love Story in Shanghai (2001)
- Sky Lovers (2002)
- Only You (2002)
- Boy & Girl (2003)
- Sound of Colors (2006)
- Emerald on the Roof (2006)
- Star Boulevard (2006)
- Paris Sonata (2006)
- Fast Track Love (2006)
- Modern Beauty (2007)
- A Mobile Love Story (2008)
- The Girl in Blue (2010)
- Single Princesses and Blind Dates (2010)
- Sunny Happiness (2011)
- Symphony of Fate (2011)
- Sealed with a Kiss (2011)
- The Queen of SOP (2012)
- When Love Walked In (2012)
- Beijing Love Story (2012)
- Drama Go! Go! Go! (2012)
- Flowers in Fog (2013)
- Best Time (2013)
- Destiny by Love (2013)
- Fiancee (2013)
- Boss & Me (2014)
- Scarlet Heart 2 (2014)
- Loving, Never Forgetting (2014)
- Go, Single Lady (2014)
- Love at Second Sight (2014)
- My Sunshine (2015)
- Diamond Lover (2015)
- Beautiful Secret (2015)
- Angel Wings (2016)
- Stay with Me (2016)
- Pretty Li Hui Zhen (2017)
- The Fox's Summer (2017)
- Angelo (2017)
- Shall I Compare You to a Spring Day (2017)
- A Seven-Faced Man (2017)
- Mr. Right (2018)
- Old Boy (2018)
- Only Side by Side with You (2018)
- Here to Heart (2018)
- Summer's Desire (2018)
- The Way We Were (2018)
- My Story for You (2018)
- All Out of Love (2018)
- Never Gone (2018)
- Shallow Lover (2018)
- If I Can Love You So (2019)
- Lucky's First Love (2019)
- River Flows to You (2019)
- See You Again (2019)
- My Girlfriend (2019)
- Find Yourself (2019)
- Tears in Heaven (2019)
- Love is Sweet (2020)
- My Girl (2020)
- Sparkle Love (2020)
- Broker (2020)
- Midsummer Is Full of Hearts (2020)
- The Love You Give Me (2023)
- The First Frost (2025)

=== Sports (运动) ===
- The Whirlwind Girl (2015)
- My Mr. Mermaid (2017)
- The King's Avatar (2019)
- The Prince of Tennis (2019)
- Skate into Love (2020)
- My Unicorn Girl (2020)
- Falling Into Your Smile (2021)
- Ping Pong (2021)
- Speed and Love (2025)

=== Youth (青春） ===
- Meteor Shower (2009)
- Back In Time (2014)
- One and a Half Summer (2014)
- Addicted (2016)
- With You (2016)
- Love O2O (2016)
- Operation Love (2017)
- Rush to the Dead Summer (2017)
- A Love So Beautiful (2017)
- My Huckleberry Friends (2017)
- I Won't Get Bullied by Girls (2018)
- Meteor Garden (2018)
- Sweet Combat (2018)
- The Brightest Star in the Sky (2019)
- Put Your Head on My Shoulder (2019)
- Le Coup de Foudre (2019)
- Go Go Squid! (2019)
- Another Me (2019)
- Unrequited Love (2019)
- A Little Reunion (2019)
- Secret in the Lattice(2021)
- When We Were Young (2021)
- Hidden Love (2023)
- When I Fly Towards You (2023)

=== Workplace (职场) ===
- Ad Mania (2013)
- The Interpreter (2016)
- Surgeons (2017)
- Game of Hunting (2017)
- Negotiator (2018)
- Our Glamorous Time (2018)
- In Youth (2019)

== Period drama (年代剧) ==
=== Drama (戏剧) ===
- A Leaf in the Storm (2003)
- The Spring River Flows East (2005)
- Moment in Peking (2005)
- Soldiers Sortie (2006)
- Shanghai Bund (2007)
- The Road We Have Taken (2009)
- In That Distance Place (2009)
- Love in Sun Moon Lake (2009)
- My Chief and My Regiment (2009)
- Moment in Peking (2014)
- Red Sorghum (2014)
- White Deer Plain (2017)
- Great Expectations (2018)
- Flesh and Spirit (2018)
- Entering a New Era (2018)
- Like a Flowing River (2018)
- Winter Begonia (2019)
- The Little Nyonya (2020)
- Forward Forever (2020)

=== Fantasy (玄幻) ===
- Wu Xin: The Monster Killer (2015)
- Guardian (2018)
- The Eight (2020)
- Love and Redemption (2020)
- Shining for One Thing (2022)

=== Romance (言情) ===
- A Romance in Shanghai (1996)
- Love Is Payable (1997)
- Romance in the Rain (2001)
- The Story of a Noble Family (2003)
- Affair of Half a Lifetime (2003)
- To Live to Love (2006)
- Love at First Fight (2007)
- The Epic of a Woman (2009)
- Love in a Fallen City (2009)
- Entangling Love in Shanghai (2010)
- Too Late to Say I Love You (2010)
- Lady & Liar (2015)
- Legend of Fragrance (2015)
- Cruel Romance (2015)
- Destined to Love You (2015)
- Siege in Fog (2018)
- Arsenal Military Academy (2019)
- Love in a Fallen City (2019)

=== Spy (谍战) / War (战争) ===
- Drawing Sword (2005)
- Lurk (2009)
- Tian Xing Jian (2011)
- Jue Ze (2012)
- Arrows in a Bowstring (2013)
- Battle of Changsha (2014)
- Lost in 1949 (2014)
- The Disguiser (2015)
- Decoded (2016)
- Sparrow (2016)
- Rookie Agent Rouge (2016)
- Spy Hunter (2019)
- Autumn Cicada (2020)
- Thin Ice (2023)

=== Suspense (悬疑) ===
- Tientsin Mystic (2017)
- The Chronicles of Town Called Jian (2018)
- Please Give Me a Pair of Wings (2019)
- My Roommate Is a Detective (2020)
- Couple of Mirrors (2021)

== Ancient dramas (古装剧) ==
=== Historical ===
==== Biographical / Documentary (传记) ====
- Towards the Republic (2003)
- Qiao's Grand Courtyard (2006)
- The Legend of Bruce Lee (2008)
- Ren Bishi (2008)
- Taiwan 1895 (2008)
- Huo Yuanjia (2008)
- 1911 (2011)
- Ip Man (2013)
- Mao Zedong (2013)
- Deng Xiaoping at History's Crossroads (2014)
- My Uncle Zhou Enlai (2016)
- Marshal Peng Dehuai (2016)

==== Historical (历史) ====
Involves retelling of historical events.

- Zhuge Liang (1985)
- Tang Ming Huang (1990)
- Romance of the Three Kingdoms (1994)
- Wu Zetian (1995)
- Han Liu Bang (1998)
- Shangguan Wan'er (1998)
- Records of Kangxi's Travel Incognito (1998)
- Yongzheng Dynasty (1999)
- Palace of Desire (2000)
- Sun Zi Bing Fa Yu San Shi Liu Ji (2000)
- The Taiping Heavenly Kingdom (2000)
- Qin Shihuang (2001)
- Kangxi Dynasty (2001)
- Qianlong Dynasty (2002)
- Xiaozhuang Mishi (2003)
- The Affaire in the Swing Age (2003)
- The Story of Han Dynasty (2003)
- Lady Wu: The First Empress (2003)
- Huang Taizi Mishi (2004)
- Changping of the War (2004)
- Genghis Khan (2004)
- The Legend of Guan Gong (2004)
- Taizu Mishi (2005)
- The Emperor in Han Dynasty (2005)
- Chuanqi Huangdi Zhu Yuanzhang (2006)
- Wu Zi Bei Ge (2006)
- Founding Emperor of Ming Dynasty (2006)
- Initiating Prosperity (2006)
- The Great Dunhuang (2006)
- Princess Der Ling (2006)
- The Rebirth of a King (2006)
- The Rise of the Tang Empire (2006)
- Secret History of Kangxi (2006)
- The Great Revival (2007)
- Ming Dynasty (2007)
- Ming Dynasty in 1566 (2007)
- Carol of Zhenguan (2007)
- Dongfang Shuo (2008)
- The Qin Empire (2009)
- Zheng He Xia Xiyang (2009)
- Bing Sheng (2009)
- Three Kingdoms (2010)
- The Han Triumph (2010)
- Huang Yanpei (2010)
- The Legend of Yang Guifei (2010)
- A Weaver on the Horizon (2010)
- The Dream of Red Mansions (2010)
- Secret History of Empress Wu (2011)
- The Qin Empire II: Alliance (2012)
- Chu Han Zhengxiong (2012)
- Heroes of Sui and Tang Dynasties (2012)
- Su Dongpo (2012)
- King's War (2012)
- Love Amongst War (2012)
- Nos Annees Francaises (2012)
- Heroes in Sui and Tang Dynasties (2013)
- Women of the Tang Dynasty (2013)
- The Legend of Kublai Khan (2013)
- Heroes of Sui and Tang Dynasties (2014)
- Cao Cao (2014)
- The Great Emperor in Song Dynasty (2015)
- The Advisors Alliance (2017)
- The Qin Empire III (2017)
- Secret of the Three Kingdoms (2018)

=== Costume ===
==== Comedy (喜剧) ====
- My Fair Princess (1998)
- Sunny Piggy (2000)
- Li Wei the Magistrate (2001)
- The Eloquent Ji Xiaolan (2002)
- Love Through Different Times (2002)
- My Fair Princess III (2003)
- Ma Dashuai (2004)
- Li Wei Resigns from Office (2005)
- The Lucky Stars (2005)
- The Legend of Crazy Monk (2010)
- Happy Mother-in-Law, Pretty Daughter-in-Law (2011)
- Unruly Qiao (2011)
- New My Fair Princess (2011)
- Go Princess Go (2015)
- My Amazing Bride (2015)
- Let's Shake It (2017)
- The Eternal Love (2017)
- Oh My General (2017)
- Mengfei Comes Across (2018)
- The Sleuth of the Ming Dynasty (2019)
- The Romance of Hua Rong (2019)
- The Romance of Tiger and Rose (2020)
- Oops The King Is In Love (2020)
- For Married Doctress (2020)
- New Life Begins (2022)

==== Gong'an (公案) ====
- The Three Heroes and Five Gallants (1991)
- Amazing Detective Di Renjie (2004)
- Amazing Detective Di Renjie 2 (2006)
- Amazing Detective Di Renjie 3 (2008)
- Justice Bao (2008)
- Justice Bao (2010)
- Mad Detective Di Renjie (2010)
- Da Tang Nü Xun An (2011)
- Young Sherlock (2014)
- The Three Heroes and Five Gallants (2016)
- Maiden Holmes (2020)

==== Fantasy (玄幻) ====
Involves fictional characters set in a fictional universe.

- Novoland: The Castle in the Sky (2016)
- Ice Fantasy (2016)
- A Life Time Love (2017)
- Lost Love in Times (2017)
- Tribes and Empires: Storm of Prophecy (2017)
- Legend of Fuyao (2018)
- The King of Blaze (2018)
- Ever Night (2018)
- L.O.R.D. Critical World (2019)
- Novoland: Eagle Flag (2019)

==== Historical fiction (古偶) ====
Involves actual historical characters in a fictional narrative.

- The Prince of Han Dynasty (2001)
- Huo Yunjia (2001)
- Love Legend of the Tang Dynasty (2001)
- Jingwu Yingxiong Chen Zhen (2001)
- Jiangshan Weizhong (2002)
- The Young Wong Fei Hung (2002)
- Hero During Yongle Period (2003)
- High Flying Songs of Tang Dynasty (2003)
- Assassinator Jing Ke (2004)
- How Much Sorrow Do You Have (2005)
- The Prince of Qin, Li Shimin (2005)
- Da Qing Fengyun (2006)
- Da Tang Fu Rong Yuan (2007)
- The Shadow of Empress Wu (2007)
- Beauty's Rival in Palace (2010)
- The Myth (2010)
- Palace (2011)
- The Glamorous Imperial Concubine (2011)
- Beauty World (2011)
- Scarlet Heart (2011)
- Empresses in the Palace (2011)
- Secret History of Princess Taiping (2012)
- Palace II (2013)
- Palace 3: The Lost Daughter (2014)
- Sound of the Desert (2014)
- Love Yunge from the Desert (2015)
- Legend of Lu Zhen (2013)
- Prince of Lan Ling (2013)
- Hua Mulan (2013)
- The Patriot Yue Fei (2013)
- The Empress of China (2014)
- Legend of Ban Shu (2015)
- The Legend of Mi Yue (2015)
- Singing All Along (2016)
- Chronicle of Life (2016)
- The Imperial Doctress (2016)
- Princess Jieyou (2016)
- God of War, Zhao Yun (2016)
- The Princess Weiyoung (2016)
- The Glory of Tang Dynasty (2017)
- Legend of Dragon Pearl (2017)
- Rule the World (2017)
- Song of Phoenix (2017)
- Nothing Gold Can Stay (2017)
- Untouchable Lovers (2018)
- The Legend of Dugu (2018)
- Story of Yanxi Palace (2018)
- Ruyi's Royal Love in the Palace (2018)
- The Legend of Haolan (2019)
- Queen Dugu (2019)
- Chong Er's Preach (2019)
- The Longest Day in Chang'an (2019)
- Empress of the Ming (2019)
- The Wolf (2020)
- Held in the Lonely Castle (2020)
- Ode to Daughter of Great Tang (2020)
- The Legend of Xiao Chuo (2020)
- The Song of Glory (2020)
- The Promise of Chang'an (2020)

Involves fictional characters in actual historical settings.

- The Grand Mansion Gate (2001)
- Jin Mao Xiang (2004)
- The Last Princess (2008)
- Ancestral Temple (2009)
- Dali Princess (2009)
- Perfect Couple (2014)
- Nirvana in Fire (2015)
- General and I (2017)
- Princess Agents (2017)
- The King's Woman (2017)
- Nirvana in Fire 2 (2017)
- Legend of Yunxi (2018)
- The Rise of Phoenixes (2018)
- The Story of Minglan (2018)
- Goodbye My Princess (2019)
- I Will Never Let You Go (2019)
- Princess Silver (2019)
- Legend of the Phoenix (2019)
- Joy of Life (2020)
- Fake Princess (2020)
- Happiness Over Two Lifetime (2020)
- Royal Nirvana (2020)
- In a Class of Her Own (2020)
- Love Is All (2020)
- Miss Truth (2020)
- Destined (2023)

==== Shenmo (神魔) / Shenhua (神話) ====
- Ji Gong (1985)
- Journey to the West (1986)
- The Investiture of the Gods (1990)
- Journey to the West (1996)
- Journey to the West – Legends of the Monkey King (1999)
- Eternity: A Chinese Ghost Story (2003)
- Lotus Lantern (2005)
- The Fairies of Liaozhai (2007)
- Butterfly Lovers (2007)
- The Legend and the Hero (2007)
- The Legend and the Hero 2 (2009)
- Prelude of Lotus Lantern (2009)
- Ancient Legends (2010)
- Wu Cheng'en and Journey to the West (2010)
- Journey to the West (2010)
- Journey to the West (2011)
- Painted Skin (2011)
- The Holy Pearl (2011)
- Ma Zu (2012)
- The Legend of Chasing Fish (2013)
- The Investiture of the Gods (2014)
- Legend of Nine Tails Fox (2016)
- The Destiny of White Snake (2018)
- The Legend of White Snake (2019)
- The Gods (2019)
- Zhaoge (2020)

==== Wuxia (武侠) ====
- Outlaws of the Marsh (1983)
- Dream of the Red Chamber (1987)
- The Book and the Sword (1994)
- The Water Margin (1998)
- Treasure Venture (2000)
- Legendary Fighter: Yang's Heroine (2001)
- Laughing in the Wind (2001)
- Book and Sword, Gratitude and Revenge (2002)
- Drunken Hero (2002)
- Ode to Gallantry (2002)
- Shaolin King of Martial Arts (2002)
- The Heaven Sword and Dragon Saber (2003)
- Demi-Gods and Semi-Devils (2003)
- The Legend of the Condor Heroes (2003)
- Lian Cheng Jue (2004)
- Warriors of the Yang Clan (2004)
- The Dragon Heroes (2005)
- The Proud Twins (2005)
- The Royal Swordsmen (2005)
- Trail of the Everlasting Hero (2005)
- Lost City in Snow Heaven (2005)
- The Return of the Condor Heroes (2006)
- Eight Heroes (2006)
- Eight Charts (2006)
- Romance of Red Dust (2006)
- Seven Swordsmen (2006)
- The Young Warriors (2006)
- The Legend of Chu Liuxiang (2007)
- The Legend of Lu Xiaofeng (2007)
- Sword Stained with Royal Blood (2007)
- The Legend of the Condor Heroes (2008)
- The Book and the Sword (2008)
- Paladins in Troubled Times (2008)
- Rose Martial World (2008)
- Royal Tramp (2008)
- The Shaolin Warriors (2008)
- The Heaven Sword and Dragon Saber (2009)
- The Vigilantes In Masks (2010)
- The Patriotic Knights (2010)
- Invincible Knights Errant (2011)
- Kong Que Ling (2011)
- Twin of Brothers (2011)
- All Men Are Brothers (2011)
- The Bride with White Hair (2012)
- The Legend of Chu Liuxiang (2012)
- Romance of the Western Chamber (2013)
- Demi-Gods and Semi-Devils (2013)
- Swordsman (2013)
- Sleek Rat, the Challenger (2013)
- The Deer and the Cauldron (2014)
- The Four (2015)
- Men with Sword (2016)
- The Legend of the Condor Heroes (2017)
- The Flame's Daughter (2018)
- Bloody Romance (2018)
- Heavenly Sword and Dragon Slaying Sabre (2019)
- Listening Snow Tower (2019)
- Under The Power (2019)
- Sword Dynasty (2019)
- New Dragon Gate Inn (2019)
- Legend of Awakening (2020)
- And The Winner Is Love (2020)
- Mei Ren Mu Bai Shou (2020)
- Handsome Siblings (2020)
- Twisted Fate of Love (2020)

==== Xianxia (仙侠) ====
- Chinese Paladin (2005)
- Chinese Paladin 3 (2009)
- Xuan-Yuan Sword: Scar of Sky (2012)
- Swords of Legends (2014)
- Legend of Zu Mountain (2015)
- The Journey of Flower (2015)
- Chinese Paladin 5 (2016)
- Noble Aspirations (2016)
- Eternal Love (2017)
- Fighter of the Destiny (2017)
- Xuan-Yuan Sword: Han Cloud (2017)
- Ashes of Love (2018)
- Martial Universe (2018)
- Battle Through the Heavens (2018)
- The Legends (2019)
- The Untamed (2019)
- Love and Destiny (2019)
- Eternal Love of Dream (2020)
- Love and Redemption (2020)
- Immortal Samsara (2022)
- Love You Seven Times (2023)
- The Longest Promise (2023)
- The Starry Love (2023)
- Till The End Of The Moon (2023)

== See also ==
- List of Chinese animated series
