= Guan Gong (disambiguation) =

- Traditional Chinese: 關公
- Simplified Chinese: 关公
- Literal meaning: Lord Guan
Transcriptions
Standard Mandarin
- Hanyu Pinyin: Guān Gōng
- Wade–Giles: Kuan^{1} Kung^{1}

Guan Yu (died 220) was a general during the late Han dynasty period, serving the warlord Liu Bei. He has become a legendary and mythical figure in Chinese culture, and has often been referred to as Guan Gong (literally "Lord Guan").

Guan Gong may also refer to:

- Guan Gong (TV series), a 1996 Taiwanese TV series starring Kou Feng as Guan Yu
- The Legend of Guan Gong, a 2002 Chinese TV series starring Wang Yingquan as Guan Yu

== See also ==
- Yuncheng Guangong Airport, an airport in Yuncheng, Shanxi, China, named after Guan Yu
