= Zhuge Liang (disambiguation) =

Zhuge Liang (181–234) was a statesman of the state of Shu Han in the Three Kingdoms period.

Zhuge Liang, Chu-ko Liang or Chu-ke Liang may also refer to:

- Chu Ke-liang (1946–2017), a Taiwanese actor and comedian
- The Legendary Prime Minister – Zhuge Liang, Chinese title Zhuge Liang, a 1985 Hong Kong television series starring Adam Cheng
- Zhuge Liang (TV series), a 1985 Chinese television series starring Li Fazeng
