= Mother's Life =

Chinese television series

Mother's Life (Chinese: 娘道; pinyin: Niáng Dào) is a Chinese television series directed by Guo Jingyu (郭靖宇). As of September 2018 it had 76 episodes. Yue Lina (岳丽娜) plays the main character, and the series also stars Liu Zhiyang (刘智扬), Yu Yi (于毅), and Zhang Shaohua (张少华).

Liu Yingniang (柳瑛娘; Yue), the main character, resides in Shanxi Province. People in her community attempt to kill her in a sacrificial ceremony to a dragon god/ river god, but she does not die. She marries a man belonging to an affluent family, but is ostracized by members of the said family because she does not give birth to a boy; all three children are girls. An enemy of her husband kills him, and over the course of the story she loses contact with the three girls and finds that her new husband is addicted to opium.

== Production and distribution ==
Filming took place in outlying areas of Beijing. A total of fifteen sound stages were used, and the duration of filming for the first season was ten months.

A television station asked for additional money in exchange for higher audience ratings for Mother's Life, according to Guo. The show began airing on Beijing Satellite TV (北京卫视) on September 5, 2018.

== Reception ==
According to kuyun.com it was the drama programme with the most views on Chinese television in October 2018; it gained much of its popularity from middle aged and elderly watchers. Mandy Zuo of the South China Morning Post stated that month that the programme "enjoys good audience ratings".

The series received a negative reception from feminist and younger audiences. All-China Women's Federation periodical The China Women's News stated that the series lacked criticism of how her obedience to the idea of "'the morality of being a mother'", which they characterised as "ignorance and staleness", made her popular with male characters; the publication stated that the series made this notion "a virtue and greatness", which meant it was "apparently describing rotten things as fresh petals." Guangzhou writer Hou Hongbin, who expressed feminist views, stated that Yingniang believed herself to be an inferior person and "found somewhere else to kneel down" even after escaping calamity.

Guo stated in the Liuzhou Evening News that he was only trying to represent the culture of the era and not glorify it.

16,000 persons rated the series on Douban, a Chinese rating website for films. The average rating was 2.7 of 10. Shanghai Academy of Social Sciences researcher Lu Peng attributed the low Douban rating to its younger userbase.

=== Ratings ===
| Broadcast date | Beijing Satellite TV CSM52 City ratings | | | Jiangsu Satellite TV CSM52 City ratings | | |
| Broadcast date | Ratings (%) | Audience share (%) | Rank | Ratings (%) | Audience share (%) | Rank |
|---|---|---|---|---|---|---|
| 2018.9.5 | 0.590 | 2.275 | 6 | 0.681 | 2.653 | 4 |
| 2018.9.6 | 0.650 | 2.496 | 4 | 0.715 | 2.755 | 3 |
| 2018.9.7 | 0.653 | 2.421 | 4 | 0.686 | 2.544 | 3 |
| 2018.9.8 | 0.662 | 2.658 | 3 | 0.658 | 2.640 | 4 |
| 2018.9.9 | 0.885 | 3.264 | 2 | 0.682 | 2.517 | 4 |
| 2018.9.10 | 0.737 | 2.844 | 4 | 0.692 | 2.673 | 5 |
| 2018.9.11 | 0.826 | 3.186 | 3 | 0.772 | 2.983 | 5 |
| 2018.9.12 | 0.881 | 3.333 | 3 | 0.816 | 3.096 | 4 |
| 2018.9.13 | 1.064 | 4.086 | 1 | 0.902 | 3.473 | 4 |
| 2018.9.14 | 1.098 | 4.053 | 1 | 0.964 | 3.563 | 3 |
| 2018.9.15 | 0.929 | 3.541 | 3 | 0.959 | 3.644 | 2 |
| 2018.9.16 | 1.220 | 4.294 | 1 | 1.040 | 3.665 | 3 |
| 2018.9.17 | 1.353 | 5.158 | 1 | 0.928 | 3.541 | 2 |
| 2018.9.18 | 1.346 | 5.095 | 1 | 0.836 | 3.169 | 2 |
| 2018.9.19 | 1.384 | 5.346 | 1 | 0.874 | 3.385 | 2 |
| 2018.9.20 | 1.402 | 5.407 | 1 | 0.884 | 3.422 | 2 |
| 2018.9.21 | 1.363 | 5.363 | 1 | 0.896 | 3.514 | 2 |
| 2018.9.22 | 1.358 | 5.387 | 1 | 0.798 | 3.149 | 2 |
| 2018.9.23 | 1.563 | 5.888 | 1 | 0.912 | 3.420 | 2 |
| 2018.9.24 | 1.452 | 5.218 | 1 | 0.902 | 3.231 | 2 |
| 2018.9.25 | 1.693 | 6.279 | 1 | 1.01 | 3.748 | 2 |
| 2018.9.26 | 1.693 | 6.382 | 1 | 1.015 | 3.826 | 2 |
| 2018.9.27 | 1.748 | 6.662 | 1 | 0.935 | 3.568 | 2 |
| 2018.9.28 | 1.885 | 7.300 | 1 | 1.016 | 3.933 | 2 |
| 2018.9.29 | 1.620 | 6.234 | 1 | 0.997 | 3.823 | 2 |
| 2018.9.30 | 1.825 | 6.656 | 1 | 0.989 | 3.609 | 2 |
| 2018.10.1 | 1.747 | 6.713 | 1 | 0.871 | 3.343 | 2 |
| 2018.10.2 | 1.891 | 7.347 | 1 | 0.943 | 3.663 | 2 |
| 2018.10.3 | 1.732 | 6.817 | 1 | 0.911 | 3.586 | 2 |
| 2018.10.4 | 1.883 | 7.352 | 1 | 0.940 | 3.665 | 2 |
| 2018.10.5 | 2.179 | 8.07 | 1 | 0.977 | 3.62 | 2 |
| 2018.10.6 | 2.224 | 8.22 | 1 | 1.082 | 3.99 | 2 |
| 2018.10.7 | 2.166 | 7.58 | 1 | 1.167 | 4.09 | 2 |
| 2018.10.8 | 2.208 | 8.09 | 1 | 1.077 | 3.95 | 2 |
| 2018.10.9 | 2.109 | 7.81 | 1 | 1.053 | 3.91 | 2 |
| 2018.10.10 | 2.183 | 7.95 | 1 | 1.104 | 4.03 | 2 |
| 2018.10.11 | 2.085 | 7.65 | 1 | 1.031 | 3.8 | 2 |
| 2018.10.12 | 2.209 | 8.068 | 1 | 1.191 | 4.348 | 2 |
| 2018.10.13 | 1.986 | 7.219 | 1 | 1.105 | 4.007 | 2 |
| 2018.10.14 | 2.267 | 8.025 | 1 | 1.202 | 4.256 | 2 |
| 2018.10.15 | 2.373 | 8.694 | 1 | 1.258 | 4.614 | 2 |

- Highest ratings are marked in red, lowest ratings are marked in blue
