= Chinese television drama =

Television drama series originating from Mainland China

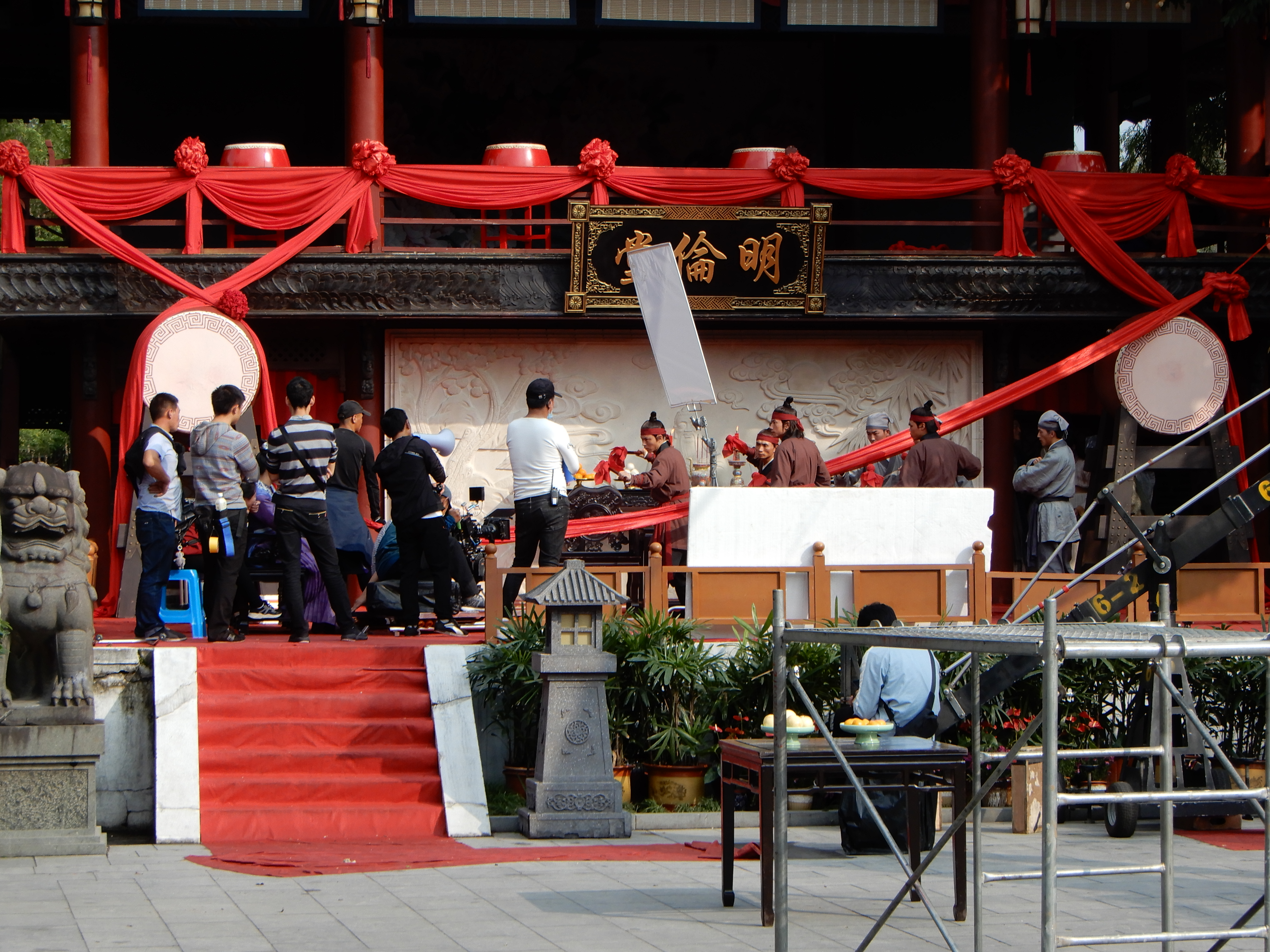
Drama filming at Hengdian World Studios

Chinese television dramas (Chinese: 中国电视连续剧; pinyin: Zhōngguó diànshì liánxùjù), sometimes colloquially known as C-dramas, are Chinese-language television drama series originating from China, sometimes including co-productions with the Greater China region. Popular drama series genres in China include fantasy romance, period costume, contemporary urban and thriller dramas. Chinese dramas are often subjected to stringent regulatory supervisions from China's National Radio and Television Administration (NRTA).

China produces the most television drama episodes per year and has the largest number of domestic television viewers in the world. It is also the second largest video streaming market in the world by revenue. Chinese television dramas are regularly broadcast and streamed throughout Asia; particularly in Vietnam, Malaysia, Singapore, Thailand, Indonesia, the Philippines, Sri Lanka and Cambodia.

== History ==
=== 1958–1980: Early years ===
The first China-produced television program, One Piece of Cake (Chinese: 一口菜饼子), was aired in 1958, after the launch of China's first television station, Beijing TV Station (later rebranded as China Central Television, or CCTV).

Other provincial television channels were launched in the subsequent years, including Shanghai Television, Jiangsu Television, Guangdong Television and Hunan Television. From 1958 to 1966, 200 drama anthologies were broadcast, although ownership of television sets was not widespread. During the cultural revolution from 1967 to 1976, the only entertainment allowed on Chinese television was eight revolutionary operas, three war movies and some song renditions. Fictional dramas returned in 1978 with San Jia Qin, the first mainland drama filmed on location. Meanwhile, across the straits in Taiwan, the first long-form Mandarin television series Jing Jing was aired in 1969 on China Television, and the 1970s saw more familial dramas with heavy political tones produced by the three Taiwanese terrestrial channels, as martial law in Taiwan continued to be in enforcement.

=== 1980s: Expansion of state-run television channels ===
In 1980, the first drama series Eighteen Years in Enemy Camp was aired on state-run CCTV. Domestic demand for programming increased as television viewers increased from 80 million in 1978 to 1.1 billion by 1986. Besides importing foreign shows, China began to produce many costume drama series. Long-form TV adaptations of classic Chinese novels and folklore include Outlaws of the Marsh (1983), Ji Gong (1986), Dream of the Red Chamber (1987) and Journey to the West (1988).

In 1987, the Republic of China (ROC) government lifted the travel ban to mainland China, and in 1988, the People's Republic of China (PRC) government started courting ROC investments in the PRC with guarantees to safeguard their assets, visitation and legal rights. The Chinese state regulators introduced a permit system allowing for private and independent investors to co-produce television series with state-run media entities in the late 1980s as part of the reform and opening up. The thawing of cross-straits relations resulted in a series of co-productions between the two regions from the 1990s to the 2000s. Taiwanese romance novelist Chiung Yao and her team began working in mainland China on several television series, either based on her novels or original screenplays. Period drama My Fair Princess (1998), a collaboration between Chiung's production company and Hunan Broadcasting System, was a success in both regions and widely sold in other Asian markets.

=== 1990s–2000s: Rise of satellite channels and rapid commercialization ===
The 1990s also marked the start of satellite broadcast of Chinese television networks and the rapid commercialization of television programming in the form of advertising. China Central Television and other provincial channels like Zhejiang Television, Anhui Television, Jiangsu Television, Dragon TV and Hunan Television began expanding their satellite network coverage and diversifying programming offerings. Family drama Ke Wang (1990), immigrant story A Native of Beijing in New York (1993), and sitcom I Love My Family were some of the contemporary dramas aired on prime-time television. Fortress Besieged (1990), a period drama adapted from the satirical novel by Qian Zhongshu, was critically acclaimed. The first mainland-produced idol romance drama Cherish Our Love Forever was also aired in 1998.

Since the 1990s, historical serials have been the dominant genre on prime-time television. The trend peaked in the late 1990s and early 2000s, with many palace (also known as "Qing") dramas shown on television. Fictionalized drama series based on well-known ancient figures like Romance of the Three Kingdoms (1994) and The Legend of Liu Yong (1996) continued to draw strong ratings. Producers like Zhang Jizhong and Wong Jing also started making the mainland television adaptations of classic wuxia novels, such as those written by household names Jin Yong and Gu Long. Critical reception to shows such as The Legend of the Condor Heroes (2003), The Proud Twins (2005) and Demi-Gods and Semi-Devils (2003) was mixed and they are often compared to previous adaptations from Hong Kong and Taiwan. Investment groups like Hengdian Group expanded into movie and television production in the mid-1990s, building large filming sets for different dynastic (and Republic) periods. Hengdian's large film set in eastern Zhejiang was said to have accommodated at least 70% of China's films and TV shows at one point. Established Hong Kong television production companies like TVB also began producing dynastic period dramas such as A Step into the Past (2001) and War and Beauty (2004) in mainland China due to the availability of such sets.

After the turn of the millennium, Chinese historical fantasy romance dramas started gaining popularity, eventually overtaking the market share of adaptations of wuxia novels that were popular in the previous decades. Seasoned Hong Kong director Lee Kwok-lap produced the hugely popular Chinese Paladin (2005), the television adaption of the first installment of the Sword and Fairy video game series, contributing to the popularity of xianxia and xuanhuan (fantasy) genres in the mainland entertainment landscape. As these fantasy shows are often not tied to a specific dynasty or era, scriptwriters and designers had more creative leeway in their production, often mixing elements of Chinese mythology with modern humor and romance elements that are noticeably different from the stoic, honorable themes in wuxia genres.

=== 2010s: Regulatory changes and emergence of streaming television ===
Historical period dramas continued to be popular in the early 2010s. Imperial power struggle drama series with female leads set in the Qing dynasty such as Empresses in the Palace (2011), Scarlet Heart (2011) and Story of Yanxi Palace (2018) became an important side genre in mainland China, although the genre has since come under regulatory criticism for its "extravagance and negative influence on society".

A series of escalating protectionist measures were issued by the regulatory body in the mid-2010s. In 2014, the Chinese government announced that imported foreign films and TV series required publication licenses in order to be aired within China. Korean dramas, then one of the most popular drama genres in China, as well as Korean-Chinese co-productions, were banned from both broadcast and streaming services in 2016, following the THAAD missile deployment disagreement between China and South Korea. Regulators also banned the broadcast of foreign television shows during prime-time slots and issued quotas on the number of imported content on streaming video platforms in 2018. At the same time, streaming television took off in China as technology giants Baidu, Tencent and Alibaba invested more in their own Chinese productions under their respective streaming business units iQiyi, Tencent Video and Youku. Traditional terrestrial broadcasters also started partnering with streamers to deal with declining TV viewership. Since the mid-2010s, intellectual property (IP) adaptation rights of popular online novels, video games and comics were in huge demand as television adaptations of such works started becoming common, examples of which include the adventure series The Lost Tomb (2015), danmei novel adaptation The Untamed (2019), as well as historical political dramas Nirvana in Fire (2015) and Joy of Life (2019). Between 2018 and 2019, 42 out of 100 of the top television series were adapted from web fiction.

Since the 2000s, celebrity-driven television dramas have allocated a significant portion of their production budgets to actor salaries in order to attract viewership. Hong Kong television producer Gary Yeung Siu-hung noted in a 2006 interview that mainland actors may command salaries 2 to 5 times higher than their Hong Kong or Taiwanese counterparts with comparable popularity. In 2016, Shanghai Media Group executive Wang Leiqing acknowledged that up to 76% of production costs could be attributed to actor pay. For example, the two lead actors of the 2018 series Ruyi's Royal Love in the Palace reportedly received a combined total of over 150 million yuan for the 87-episode series. In 2020, the National Radio and Television Administration (NRTA) issued a notice stipulating that television actors' salaries must not surpass 40% of the total production cost. Furthermore, the pay for lead actor cannot exceed 70% of the total actors' salaries.

=== 2020s–present: Streaming dominance and rise of micro-dramas ===
During the initial outbreak of the COVID-19 pandemic in China, all television productions were halted in February 2020, and filming resumed 1 to 2 months later. The number of application for distribution licenses of television drama in 2020 decreased by around 26% compared to 2019.

By the early 2020s, streaming television services like iQiyi and Tencent Video had reached more than 100 million monthly paying subscribers respectively, with the market reaching saturation and fragmentation. Monetization and profitability became paramount for the major tech-backed streamers as long-form videos is increasingly considered as part of their more mature business units. In early 2024, Tencent CEO Ma Huateng expressed the corporation's focus on premium flagship dramas, which he identified as The Long Season, Three-Body and Blossoms Shanghai, in order to build brand reputation and draw user subscriptions, instead of having many smaller productions which provided little commercial and brand value. After the massive success of its 2023 criminal drama series The Knockout, iQiyi leaders also stated their focus on quality content instead of celebrity star power in their drama series, with a focus on genre series and high investment epic drama series.

Television productions also had to compete with short video and live-streaming social media like Bytedance's Douyin and Kuaishou for user screen time. Duanjus, also known as mini-dramas or micro-dramas (Chinese: 微短剧), became increasingly popular on Douyin, WeChat and Kuaishou. According to iiMedia Research, revenue of Chinese mini dramas reached 37.39 billion yuan in 2023, an increase of 267.65% from the previous year. Each episode of a mini series lasts from seconds to several minutes and are also subject to regulatory scrutiny of the NRTA.

== Characteristics ==
Other Chinese-language dramas such as Taiwanese dramas, Hong Kong dramas, and Singaporean dramas may sometimes be attributed as Chinese dramas, although each region has a distinctly different filming style, editing format and colloquial terms.

Long-form Chinese television series vary in quality, although since the mid to late 2010s, observers have noted an increase in production values and script quality in some series.

Many Chinese television series end each episode in a cliffhanger. The channel CCTV-8 airs TV series around the clock. Episodes usually begin with opening theme music over credits as well as an ending theme music with additional credits.

== Format ==
Chinese television series can be in the forms of anthology series, serial, mini-series and micro-series.

Anthology series such as Strange Tales of Liao Zhai (2005) and Medal of the Republic (2021) feature multiple standalone stories and with a different set of characters, while long-form serials tell a story with an overarching plot over many episodes. The average episode per drama series is around 30-40 episodes, which each episode lasting between 40 and 60 minutes. Prior to 2020, some non-sitcom Chinese television serials such as Empresses in the Palace could go up to 76 episodes and more. Some screenwriters have admitted to increasing episode count by dozens at the request of investors, incorporating unnecessary padding to the story. In February 2020, regulators have imposed a maximum limit of 40 episodes for show length, with a recommendation for producers to aim for no more than 30 episodes to maintain production quality.

Mini-series in China such as crime drama The Bad Kids (2020) and The Long Season (2023) tell a more concise story over 10 to 24 episodes and usually conclude within a season.

Duanju, also known as micro-dramas, are serialized dramas minutes in length per episode. These shows are meant to be watched on mobile devices on Douyin and WeChat. These series utilize a hybrid monetization model, combining subscription-based access with pay-per-view options for individual episodes.

== Genres ==
Chinese drama genres range from romance, comedy, horror, family drama, sports, thriller, wuxia, xianxia, nationalist, political or a mixture of these in the form of ancient, historical, Republican era or modern contemporary settings.

There is a significant preference for romance television series in Asia. According to a 2019 study, 14% of the Chinese series in production were romance-themed, compared to 6% in United States. Conversely, crime and thriller genres are underrepresented in China.

Since the 1990s, main melody (Chinese: 主旋律; pinyin: zhǔxuánlǜ) and tribute dramas (Chinese: 献礼剧; pinyin: xiànlǐ jù) have become common. Main melody dramas are television series with patriotic and propagandist undertones, while tribute dramas are shows that are partially commissioned or subsidized by CCTV (or other government entities) to celebrate and mark major milestones of the Chinese Communist Party (CCP). These series are usually aired on free-to-air satellite channels CCTV-1 or CCTV-8. In 2018, the National Radio and Television Administration (or NRTA, previously known as the State Administration of Radio, Film, and Television) came up with an overall planning guide to select 100 tribute dramas to be aired between 2018 and 2022, series under the selection should be guided by Xi Jinping Thought, with storylines that are realistic, moralistic and promoting Chinese nationalism and Core Socialist Values. In 2019, China banned historical dramas and idol dramas in the period leading up to the 70th anniversary of the founding of the People's Republic of China. The state censorship regulator announced that television channels should only broadcast programs that focus "on different historical aspects that show the great struggle of the Chinese nation as its people have stood up and become richer and stronger". Audience reaction to some of the government-approved shows are mixed, some examples of those with higher ratings and critical review include Perfect Youth (2018) and Like a Flowing River (2021). Other popular commercial thrillers such as the 2017 hit series In the Name of the People, and the 2023 series The Knockout, focus on the heroic story of the protagonists fighting against corruption under the CCP's auspices. These shows have become more sophisticated as the industry adopts more nuanced plots and higher production standards.

== Censorship ==
Mainland-produced dramas have also been the targets of censorship, either explicitly with directives from the National Radio and Television Administration (NRTA), or implicitly due to self-censorship from the production companies and streamers.

There is no content rating system for television dramas in China. Creatives are often required to adhere to explicit directives from the NRTA, in order to pass the government review process. The guidelines do not have judicial validity, and sometimes changes over the years, but members of the television association follow them as a form of "self regulation".

=== Moral and cultural ===
In many cases, scriptwriters and producers have followed regulatory guidelines by "adopting a positive ending where the good triumphs over evils and making the protagonist a morally good person". Shows can also be censored after airing. In mid-2015, the Chinese regulators criticized several shows for promoting 'Western lifestyles,' cleavage, smoking, drinking, adultery or themes such as time travel and reincarnation. Period drama series such as Story of Yanxi Palace and Ruyi's Royal Love in the Palace were pulled from streaming services after a direct reprimand from a party-aligned newspaper, the Beijing Daily, for not promoting socialist values, as they "propagated a luxurious and hedonistic lifestyle, encouraging admiration for imperial life and a glorification of emperors overshadowing the heroes of today".

In 2022, the NRTA called for an end to the wildly-popular dangai (Chinese: 耽改) television genre, which consisted of television adaptations of gay-themed online novels; male actors were also discouraged from looking "effeminate".

=== Political ===
Politically sensitive dramas such as Towards the Republic (2003) were either heavily censored or outright banned from reruns and on-demand streaming services, as they portrayed historical characters like Empress Cixi and Nationalist leaders in a sympathetic and complex manner, and political ideologies that are not aligned with the Communist Party movement.

=== Blacklisted talent ===
Some television dramas are also banned or heavily cut due to the behavior of their cast and crew. In 2014, the SAPPRFT (now NRTA) specifically put out a statement banning celebrities who have used drugs or visited prostitutes (Chinese: 劣迹艺人) from state television and other media outlets. Television actors such as Huang Haibo and Gao Hu's productions were immediately dropped from broadcast.

Celebrities that were blacklisted by the China Association of Performing Arts and other government bodies due to scandals involving tax evasion, sexual assault and unpatriotic behavior may have their scenes cut, obfuscated, their faces swapped digitally by AI, or have their entire filmography pulled from syndication and streaming services.

== Production companies ==
Since the 2010s, several production companies have emerged as the main drama production and distribution companies for the major streaming networks and the largest state-run channels, often representing industry interests and setting TV production standards as a collective. The six major television drama companies in mainland China include Daylight Entertainment (Chinese: 正午阳光), Huace Media (Chinese: 华策影视), New Classics Media (Chinese: 新丽传媒), Linmon Media (Chinese: 柠萌影视), Ciwen Media (Chinese: 慈文传媒) and Shanghai Youhug Media (Chinese: 耀客传媒).

== Dubbing ==
Chinese dramas are often dubbed by professional voice actors. This is due to the fact that almost all mainland dramas are required to be aired using putonghua, the standard Mandarin dialect, and many Mandarin-speaking actors have regional accents. To standardize the pronunciation throughout the production, voice actors trained in standard Mandarin are employed in post-production. Subpar filming conditions may also result in poor audio quality and ambient noises, which requires post-production editing. Voice acting is also sometimes used to improve an actor's otherwise poor performance. Censorship may also require changing some lines in post-production.

It usually takes one month to do the dubbing for 30 to 40 episodes in post-production. Popular voice actors may dub several series a year and are well-known figures to fans. There are actors who are usually not dubbed, including Hu Ge, Wang Kai, Jin Dong, Jiang Xin and Deng Chao.

== See also ==
- List of Chinese television series
- Television in China
- Taiwanese drama, Chinese dramas explicitly produced in Taiwan
- Hong Kong television drama, Chinese dramas explicitly produced in Hong Kong
- Cinema of China
- C-pop
- Mandopop
- Duanju, short drama
