= Baike Quan Shuo =

- Also known as: Chinese: 百科全说
- Genre: Variety show
- Country of origin: China
- Original language: Mandarin

Production
- Running time: 40 minutes

Original release
- Network: Hunan Broadcasting System (HBS)
- Release: 30 November 2009 – 10 March 2011

Baike Quanshuo is a Chinese variety show produced by Hunan Broadcasting System. The series debuted on November 30, 2009. The show was hosted by Xie Na (until February 8, 2010) and Li Weijia. It was broadcast every Monday through Thursday at 7:30 pm. After Xie Na left the show, she was replaced by Fang Qiong.
