= Ai Chang Cai Hui Ying =

Chinese game show

- Chinese: 爱唱才会赢
- Created by: Endemol (episode 1–12, 14–16)
- Starring: Chen Huan; Tian Yue; Zuo Yan; Huang Ziwen
- Country of origin: China
- No. of episodes: 99

Production
- Running time: about 90–120 minutes per episode (incl. commercials)

Original release
- Network: Zhejiang Television
- Release: November 15, 2008 – October 31, 2010

Ai Chang Cai Hui Ying (Simplified Chinese: 爱唱才会赢, literally translated as "only those who love to sing will win") is a charity game show produced by Zhejiang Television. It was premiered on November 15, 2008 and ended on October 31, 2010. The hosts were Chen Huan (陈欢), Tian Yue (天悅), Zuo Yan (左岩) and Huang Ziwen (黄子文) as of the last episode. Former hosts include Hua Shao (华少), Zhu Dan (朱丹) and Shen Tao (沈涛). The format of an internationally famous game show Deal or No Deal was adapted for the first 16 episodes (except for episode 13) of the show.

== Format ==
The set and the opening music are similar to the American version of Deal or No Deal.

=== Episode 1 to 5 (November 15 to December 20, 2008) ===
Each of the 26 models, called "Angels of Dream" (梦想天使), was carrying a briefcase which containing a name of a song with a value (ranging from ¥0.01 to ¥100,000, about US$14,600), the higher value the song was, the easier the song for the player to sing. The song with the highest value was the "Ultimate Song of Dream" (终极梦想曲) chosen by the player.

During the game, the banker, called the "Manager of Dream" (梦想经理人), would offer an amount of money and a song chosen by him. The player then had to decide to accept the offer and sing the song, or to reject the offer and continue playing.

Since episode 3 (November 29, 2008), each briefcase had a value only and the "Manager of Dream" offers an amount of money only. Shen Tao, one of the hosts, was being the Manager from that episode until episode 12.

Case values:

¥0.01	¥1,000
¥1	¥2,000
¥5	¥3,000
¥10	¥4,000
¥25	¥5,000
¥50	¥7,500
¥75	¥10,000
¥100	¥20,000
¥200	¥30,000
¥300	¥40,000
¥400	¥50,000
¥500	¥75,000
¥750	¥100,000

=== Episode 6 to 12 (January 3 to February 15, 2009) ===
The number of "Angels of Dream" and briefcases were both decreased to 22.

Case values:

¥0.01	¥1,000
¥1	¥2,000
¥5	¥3,000
¥10	¥5,000
¥25	¥10,000
¥50	¥20,000
¥100	¥30,000
¥200	¥40,000
¥300	¥50,000
¥400	¥75,000
¥500	¥100,000

=== Episode 13 (February 22, 2009) ===
This episode was the Xiaoshenyang imitators special. No games were played in this episode.

=== Episode 14 to 16 (March 1 to 22, 2009) ===
Two cases containing "Chance" (机会) and two containing "Luck" (幸运) were added, made the number of cases backed to 26. After a "Chance" or "Luck" cases is opened, the player had to play a mini game, if he/she won the game, an extra amount would be awarded (¥2,000 for "Chance" cases and ¥3,000 for "Luck" cases). The player could get the maximum of ¥110,000.

Case values:

Luck	Chance
Chance	Luck
¥0.01	¥1,000
¥1	¥2,000
¥5	¥3,000
¥10	¥5,000
¥25	¥10,000
¥50	¥20,000
¥100	¥30,000
¥200	¥40,000
¥300	¥50,000
¥400	¥75,000
¥500	¥100,000

=== Episode 17 to 19 (March 29 to April 19, 2009) ===
The game rules were different from Deal or No Deal from episode 17. There were 3 rounds in the game. The player had to choose the briefcases one by one, after choosing each case, the player had to answer a question about music. If the player answers correctly, the amount revealed would be awarded, otherwise, it would not be awarded.

In round 1, there were 6 cases, numbered 1 to 6, the amount ranged from ¥10 to ¥5,000. The player had to answer 3 questions correctly to enter the next round.

Case values:

¥10
¥100
¥500
¥1,000
¥2,000
¥5,000

The maximum prize of this round was ¥8,000.

In round 2, there were 8 cases, numbered 7 to 14, the amount ranged from ¥1 to ¥10,000. The player had to answer 4 questions correctly to enter the next round.

Case values:

¥1	¥1,000
¥10	¥2,000
¥100	¥5,000
¥500	¥10,000

The maximum prize of this round was ¥18,000.

In round 3, there were 12 cases, numbered 1 to 12, the amount ranged from ¥0.01 to ¥50,000. If the player answered 3 questions incorrectly or opened all the cases, the game would end.

Case values:

¥0.01	¥2,000
¥1	¥3,000
¥10	¥5,000
¥100	¥10,000
¥500	¥20,000
¥1,000	¥50,000

The maximum prize of this round was ¥91,611.01. The player could get the maximum of ¥117,611.01 in the whole game.

=== Episode 20 to 45 (April 12 to October 18, 2009) ===
==== Two players ====
Since episode 20, there were two players in each episode (except for episode 21, see below).

There were 8 cases in round 1 and only one of them contained ¥10,000. The two players would choose a case and answer a question alternately. The ¥10,000 would be awarded to the player who had chosen the case contained prize if the answer was correct. No players would be eliminated from this round.

There were 14 cases in round 2. The two players would choose a case and answer a question alternately as well. The amount in the case would be awarded to the player who had chosen that case for each correct answer. If answered by mistake, it would be awarded to the opposing player. The game ends when the player who got the lower amount is impossible to exceed the opposing player, only the player with the largest amount could win the prize.

Case values:

¥0.01	¥3,000
¥1	¥4,000
¥10	¥5,000
¥100	¥10,000
¥500	¥20,000
¥1,000	¥40,000
¥2,000	¥50,000

==== One player ====
There were 6 and 8 cases in round 1 and round 2 respectively, only one case in each of the two rounds contained prize, which was ¥5,000 in round 1 and ¥10,000 in round 2. The player would choose a case then answer a question after choosing each case. The prize would be awarded to the player if the answer was correct and if the case contained the prize. However, in each of the two rounds, if the player failed to find the case within 3 times, no prize would be awarded. The player could still enter the next round if failed.

Round 3 was the same as that of episode 17 to 19. The player could get the maximum of ¥106,611.01 in the whole game.

=== Episode 46 (October 25, 2009) ===
Two players would participate in round 1 individually. 10 "Angels of Dream" would sing a song one by one, then the players had to guess the names of the songs. The prize would increase for each correct answer (see the table below). No players would be eliminated from this round.

Number of correct answers	Prize (Renminbi)
1	¥100
2	¥200
3	¥400
4	¥500
5	¥1,000
6	¥3,000
7	¥4,000
8	¥5,000
9	¥10,000
10	¥20,000

Round 2 was the same as that of episode 20 to 45 (two players).

=== Episode 47 to 62 (November 1, 2009 to February 14, 2010) ===
There were 4 sub-rounds and 14 cases in round 1. In each sub-round, the host would pick out some cases then the two players would choose one of the cases and answer a question alternately. The amount in the case would be awarded to the player who chose that case for each correct answer. If the player answered by mistake, it would not be awarded. The player with the largest amount over the 4 sub-rounds could enter the next round with whose amount. The case values were the same as the round 2 of episode 20 to 45 (two players).

Originally in round 2, 10 cases containing numbers 1 to 10 were shuffled, the host would open the first case to reveal the first number, and then the winner of round 1 had to guess, one by one from the second case, whether the number in the case was greater or smaller than the last number revealed. The amount of the player would increase to ¥100,000 for successive correct guesses up to the fifth case then ¥10,000 would be awarded for each correct guess. The maximum possible winning of the player overall was ¥150,000.

Later, the number of cases was decreased to 8 since the loser of round 1 could remove two of the 10 cases first. The rules afterward were the same as the original but the maximum possible winning of the player overall was ¥130,000 only.

There were only one team of players (Taiwanese band Fahrenheit) in episode 51 (November 29, 2009) and their amount after round 1 had exceeded ¥100,000, so their amount would increase to ¥150,000 for successive correct guesses up to the fifth case in round 2 and their maximum possible winning overall was ¥180,000. They won ¥160,000 finally.

Round 2 was cancelled later. In the whole game, only the player with the largest amount could win the prize.
