= Run Daddy Run =

- intertitle
- Also known as: Daddy Run
- Simplified Chinese: 老爸快跑
- Hanyu Pinyin: Lǎo Bà Kuài Pǎo
- Created by: Zhang Haichao; Cao Guang
- Written by: Zhang Yunxiao
- Directed by: Gao Yigong
- Starring: Xu Zheng; Yi Chunde
- Ending theme: "Zhang San de Ling Yi Shou Ge" (张三的另一首歌) by Wang Tongyu
- Composer: Wang Tongyu
- Country of origin: China
- Original languages: Mandarin; some English
- No. of episodes: 20

Production
- Producers: Li Jing; Li Jishan
- Cinematography: Sun Molong
- Running time: 45 minutes
- Production companies: China International Television Corp.; Jun Lin Mei Jing Culture Communications

Original release
- Network: CCTV-1
- Release: March 24, 2010

Run Daddy Run is a 2010 Chinese television drama series, starring Xu Zheng as a struggling mid-aged father who must win a reality competition to not lose his son to a divorcing wife. Without money or transportation and hard-pressed by time, the protagonist is seen long-distance running in virtually every episode.

The series was filmed in Yantai around August 2008 and broadcast nationally on CCTV-1 in March 2010.

== Plot ==
Zhang San (Xu Zheng) is a good man who owns an antique shop in a smaller city. He makes very little from the business, but doesn't mind. Everything changes when his wife Gu Xiaohua (Dong Zhi), whom he has always gotten along well, asks for a divorce. Gu, who makes much more than him, has been hopelessly frustrated by Zhang's lack of motivation to improve himself, and wants to leave the country after the divorce, with their son. She agrees that Zhang can keep their son if he secures a ¥500,000 fund in his bank account, the only condition being he cannot borrow it. Although Gu no longer loves Zhang, she still wants him to do well, so she makes the offer to motivate him.

The only hope for Zhang is to enter a business competition sponsored by a jewelry company, since he has some familiarity with jewelries. Yuan Shuiyao (Yi Chunde), a successful manager in the company who organizes the competition, is Zhang's former classmate. An arrogant workaholic, she has no friends and treats Zhang much like everyone else: with a cold shoulder. Just as Zhang finds her hard to deal with, things happen one after another: his son goes missing over his divorce, his father gets diagnosed with terminal stomach cancer, his friend buys a fake gem and loses his store, his bike gets stolen... Having lost his vehicle, store and house, the only way for Zhang to realize his goal, without sacrificing morality, is to run, run, and run.

== Cast and characters ==
- Xu Zheng as Zhang San
- Wu Jianqi as Zhang Tianyi, Zhang San's son
- Dong Zhi as Gu Xiaohua, Zhang San's wife
- Wang Hucheng as Zhang San's father
- Yi Chunde as Yuan Shuiyao
- Song Haolin as Chen Tianyu, a contestant
- Yao Zhuoran as Yu Lili, a contestant
