= Kong Que Ling =

2011 Chinese television series

- 七种武器之孔雀翎
- Genre: Wuxia
- Based on: Qizhong Wuqi by Gu Long
- Screenplay by: Jin Rui
- Directed by: Zhang Dapeng
- Presented by: Wang Yan; Guan Zhijian; Chen Tongshan; Zhou Yi
- Starring: Ashton Chen; Yu Bo; Mu Tingting
- Opening theme: "Peacock Feather" by Ashton Chen and Fu Xiaoli
- Ending theme: "Old Dreams Rebound" by Zhu Zeroing
- Composer: Yang Haodong
- Country of origin: China
- Original language: Mandarin
- No. of episodes: 21

Production
- Executive producers: Wang Manlin; Yang Xinzhou; Tu Bu
- Producers: Jiang Xuerou; Li Peng; Fei Yong; Gao Zhiming
- Production location: China
- Cinematography: Chen Xitai; Huang Boxian
- Editors: Xu Man; Yu Wenlong
- Running time: ≈40 minutes per episode
- Production companies: Hainan Zhouyi Film and Television Production

Original release
- Network: CCTV-1
- Release: 2 January 2011 – 2011

Kong Que Ling (七种武器之孔雀翎) is a Chinese wuxia television series adapted from the novel series Qizhong Wuqi (七种武器; Seven Types of Weapons) by Gu Long. First broadcast on CCTV-1 on 2 January 2011, it starred Ashton Chen, Yu Bo and Mu Tingting in the lead roles.

== Synopsis ==
Peacock Manor is a martial arts clan known in the jianghu for its legendary weapon, the "Peacock Feather", which has been missing for over a decade. Qiu Fengwu, the young master of Peacock Manor, goes undercover under the alias Xiaowu, posing as a waiter in order to infiltrate the Green Dragon Society, an assassin organisation known for its criminal activities within the jianghu.

== Cast ==
- Ashton Chen as Qiu Fengwu / Xiaowu
- Yu Bo as Qiu Tianming
- Mu Tingting as Liu Xing / Jin Xing
- Wang Jianfu as Mafeng
- Wang Lu as Gao Li
- Chen Zhihui as Jin Kaijia
- Feng Guoqiang as Deng Dinghou
- Liu Zhenyou as Ximen Yu
- Wang Zinuo as Deng Yuru
- Yu Shasha as Shuangshuang
- You Xuande as Baili Changqing
- Jin Chen as Hou Jian
- Zhong Weihua as Ba Shao
- Wang Yimiao as Zhou Daniang
- Lu Zhiqian as Heichuan
- Chen Yuren as Ding Gan
- Shao Yiheng as Mao Zhan
- Yao Yuxin as Tang Ye
- Zhu Zhicheng as Mabian
- Duan Xunjie as Xiazi
- Zhao Dongbo as Uncle Zhao
- Shi Xiaohu as Dazhong
- Xu Lei as Qian Yi
- Wu Ying as Qiu Tianming's mother
- Hu Xiaoting as Baomei
- You Xiaolong as Ximen Sheng
- Li Yong'er as Aunt Feng
- Gao Yuan as Uncle Li
- Sun Shuaifeng as Chai Rong
- Gao Guang'ao as Wu Gong
- Shang Pengfei as Sun Er
- Zhao Ruipeng as Zheng San
