= A Leaf in the Storm (TV series) =

2003 Chinese television drama series

A Leaf in the Storm is a 2003 Chinese television drama series based on Lin Yutang's 1941 novel of the same name, which was first published in English in the United States. The TV series was first shown on CCTV-8 on 12 August 2003. In Taiwan, the series was first shown on Public Television Service on 20 July 2005.

== Cast ==
- Wang Yanan as Yao Poya
- Meng Yao as Chou Malin
- Lee Li-chun as Yao Tienchang
- Annie Yi as Chang Wanhsin
- Zheng Xiaoning
- Chen Hsiao-hsuan
- Han Qing
- Lei Kesheng
- Wang Shihuai
- Gai Ke
- Yue Hong
