= Ancient Legends =

- Promotional poster art
- Also known as: Tales of the Past

Chinese name
- Traditional Chinese: 遠古的傳說
- Simplified Chinese: 远古的传说
Transcriptions
Standard Mandarin
- Hanyu Pinyin: Yuángǔ Dè Chuánshuō
- Genre: Chinese mythology, fantasy
- Written by: Shui Nengchen; Qin Shi; Song Jinchuan
- Directed by: Wu Chia-tai; Lin Jianzhong
- Creative director: Gao Jianmin
- Presented by: Zhong Jianhua; Zhang Hua; Ma Runsheng; Xiong Cheng; Jiang Po; Zhu Ziyun; Cui Shuwen
- Starring: Vincent Chiao; Wen Qing; Ding Jun; Liao Jingsheng; Liu Dekai; Annie Wu; Liu Jia
- Theme music composer: Fu Disheng; Zhang Qing
- Opening theme: Cangqiong (苍穹) performed by Fu Disheng
- Ending theme: Huaxia Zhi Ge (华夏之歌) performed by Zhang Qing
- Composer: Liu Tianhua
- Country of origin: China
- Original language: Mandarin
- No. of episodes: 40

Production
- Executive producers: Zhang Yong; Zhang Ping; Tang Mingxia; Zhou Zhuang; Yang Rui; Deng Bin; Shi Kesheng; Peng Deqing
- Producers: Zhou Wen; Zhang Haichao; Yu Xiangdang; Xiao Lijun; Cui Shuwen; Zhang Linlin; Zhang Jinfeng; Chen Gaohong; Li Renjie; Xiong Cheng; Jiang Po; Wu Dandan; Shao Xiang
- Production location: China
- Cinematography: Gao Jianmin
- Editor: Peng Jingquan
- Camera setup: Li Xinmin; Bai Yongcheng
- Running time: 45 minutes per episode
- Production companies: China International Television Corporation; CCTV Cultural Centre Film and TV Department; China Film and TV Production; Beijing Dongfang Quanjing Media

Original release
- Network: CCTV-1
- Release: 15 August – 6 September 2010

Ancient Legends is a Chinese television series based on the myths and legends associated with the origins of the Chinese civilisation. It is based on stories in Chinese mythology and the ancient classic Shan Hai Jing. The series was first broadcast in mainland China on CCTV-1 from 15 August – 6 September 2010.

== Plot ==
The story is based on the myths and legends associated with the origins of the Chinese civilization and the earliest part of Chinese history under the Three Sovereigns and Five Emperors. After Pangu split Heaven and Earth and Nüwa created humankind, the world has been facing a plague. The Flower Goddess (the Jade Emperor's younger sister) and Shennong travel around China in search of a cure. They eventually sow the seeds of Heaven on Earth, causing flowers to blossom throughout the land, thus saving humankind. The plot also integrates other stories from Chinese mythology, such as Nüwa repairing the sky and Houyi shooting down nine suns.

== Cast ==
- Vincent Chiao as Shennong
- Wen Qing as Flower Goddess
- Ding Jun as Yellow Emperor
- Liao Jingsheng as Jade Emperor
- Liu Dekai as Fu Xi
- Annie Wu as Second Fairy
- Liu Jia as Nüwa
- Zhou Zhong as Gong Gong
- Zhao Hongfei as Demonic Emperor / Dragon Crown Prince
- Han Dong as Chi You
- Ma Xiaohua as Kua Fu
- Xu Yun as Ruoxi
- Yi Kun as Rushou
- Duan Qiuxu as Erlang Shen
- Gao Yuqing as Taibai Jinxing
- Wang Xiuqiang as Taishang Laojun
- Wang Yunchao as Houyi
- Li Bo as Zhao Xuanlang
- Zhang Chunyan as Python Spirit (Red Lady)
- Bai Yun as Baoniang
- Li Xiaofeng as Du Kang
- Yang Jincheng as Jumang
- Song Yang as Zhu Rong
- Wang Yijian as Fenghou
- Duan Weiping as Yinglong
- Wang Ke as Fifth Fairy
- Chen Jie as Sixth Fairy
- Liu Ran as Seventh Fairy
- Wang Wenlin as Eldest Fairy
- Zhou Xiang as Third Fairy
- Sun Yanan as Fourth Fairy
- Chen Sanmu as Tu Di Gong
- Zhao Zhonghua as Limu
- Dai Xiaoxu as Cangjie
- Chi Huaqiong as Queen Mother
- Zang Xiuyun as Nüba
- Yue Ding as Kitchen God
- Yang Xiaodan as Kitchen Goddess
- Qiang Gaopeng as Xuanming
- Li Yuan as God of Plague
- Xu Rongjing as Lele
- Hong Zhibin as Liaoliao
- Wang Minghao as Azure Dragon
- Sun Hao as White Tiger
- Zhang Heng as Vermilion Bird
- Li Yang as Xuan Wu
- Liu Zhengliang as Teng
- Wang Haocheng as Fengmeng
- Hou Yong as Yinlingzi
- Wei Chenfei as Yuerou
- Zhong Bo as Yuqiang
- Ma Zijun as Dragon King
- Fang Yuan as Chang'e
- Zhu Jianfeng as Shentu
- Li Yuan as Yulei
- Sun Jiaolong as Xing Tian
- Chen Chen as Pixiu
- Yin Shuo as Count of Wind
- Huang Heng as Master of Rain
- Gao Rui as Mujue

== Alternate titles ==
Alternate titles for the series include:

- Tales of the Past
- Huaxia Yanyi (华夏演义; 華夏演義; Huáxià Yǎnyì; 'Romance of Huaxia')
- Chuanshuo (传说; 傳說; Chuán Shuō; 'Legends')
- Tiannü Sanhua (天女散花; Tiānnǚ Sǎnhuā; 'The Celestial Lady Scatters Flowers')
