= The Story of Han Dynasty =

- DVD cover art
- 大汉风 / 楚汉风云 / 楚汉风流
- Genre: Historical drama
- Directed by: Wei Handao
- Creative director: Xia Nan
- Starring: Hu Jun; Xiao Rongsheng; Jacklyn Wu; Kristy Yang; Wang Gang; Li Li-chun
- Theme music composer: Zhang Shaoting; Singlee; Wang Jian
- Opening theme: "Worldly Affairs Are a Game of Chess" (天下事、一局棋) by Dai Yuqiang
- Ending theme: "Probing Emotions" (勘情) by Zhu Hua and Liu Yanyan
- Country of origin: China
- Original language: Mandarin
- No. of episodes: 50

Production
- Executive producers: Wei Handao; Huang Weiming
- Producers: Li Qingyu; Huang Yonghui
- Production location: China
- Editors: Zhou Changfu; Liu Lan
- Running time: ≈45 minutes per episode

Original release
- Network: CCTV

The Story of Han Dynasty (大汉风 / 楚汉风云 / 楚汉风流) is a Chinese historical television series based on the events of the Chu–Han Contention, an interregnum between the fall of the Qin dynasty and the founding of the Han dynasty. The series was first broadcast on CCTV in China in 2003. Directed by Wei Handao, the series starred Hu Jun, Xiao Rongsheng, Jacklyn Wu, Kristy Yang, Wang Gang and Li Li-chun.

== Cast ==
- Hu Jun as Xiang Yu
- Kristy Yang as Consort Yu
- Xin Ming as Fan Zeng
- Cai Yuanxiang as Xiang Bo
- Guo Jun as Xiang Zhuang
- Chen Zhihui as Ji Bu
- Yu Yang as Yu Ziqi
- Hu Longyin as Zhongli Mo
- Han Dong as Long Ju
- Yang Jingjing as Jun'er
- Xiao Rongsheng as Liu Bang
- Jacklyn Wu as Lü Zhi
- Shen Aojun as Lady Cao
- Wu Yue as Han Xin
- Shen Baoping as Zhang Liang
- Zhang Nan as Fan Kuai
- Hou Yueqiu as Lu Wan
- Chen Hai as Zhou Bo
- Zhang Chunzhong as Xiahou Ying
- Yang Guang as Xiao He
- Zhou Da as Cao Shen
- Wang Jian'an as Guan Ying
- Fu Bin as Chen Ping
- Zhang Rihui as Wang Ling
- Zhang Wei as Lu Gu
- Zhang Xuewen as Li Yiji
- Tong Zhongqi as Shen Yiji
- Liu Fei as Consort Qi
- Mei Lina as Consort Bo
- Chen Youwang as Liu Taigong
- Jiang Guoyin as Lü Gong
- Yi Yan as Lü Xu
- Guo Minghan as Ying Bu
- Wu Weiling as Junji
- Zhu Xiaochun as Peng Yue
- Ma Yugui as Shusun Tong
- Wang Gang as Zhao Gao
- Li Li-chun as Li Si
- Lei Ming as Qin Shi Huang
- Jia Zhaoji as Qin Er Shi
- Jia Shitou as Zhang Han
- Wang Yingqi as She Jian
- Zang Jinsheng as Wang Li
- Dong Zhihua as Sima Xin
- Cui Yugui as Dong Yi
- Wang Guoliang as Su Jiao
- Wang Yi as Xiang Liang
- Wang Yingxin as Emperor Yi of Chu
- Yu Caifa as Song Yi
- Tian Youchen as Chen Ying
- Liu Jun as Yong Chi
- Shao Tong as Lü Chen
- Zhao Jian as Gong Ao
- Cao Guoxin as Chen Yu
- Qi Jingbin as Zhang Er
- Zhao Gang as Kuai Tong
- Song Lina as Yueji
- Bo Guanjun as Huang Shigong
- Guo Wenxue as the Pei County magistrate
- Lu Peng as Chen Sheng

== Releases ==
In mainland China, the series was aired on CCTV in the form of 21 television films. In Hong Kong, Taiwan, and other regions, the series was broadcast in the form of 50 episodes, each approximately 45 minutes long.
