= Eight Charts =

Chinese television series

Eight Charts (Chinese: 八阵图) is a Chinese television series.

== Cast ==
- Yu Bo as Xun Ri Zhao
- Ada Choi (Cai Shao Fen) as Qian Xun
- Kathy Chow Hoi-Mei as Han Die Yi
- Yang Jun Yi as Xue Hin
- Yang Guang as Tao Hua
- Wang Jiu Sheng as Qian Chong
- Monica Chan as Shi Huan
- Lu Xing Yu as An Lushan
