= Ke Wang =

Chinese television series

Ke Wang (Chinese: 渴望) is a Chinese television series released in 1990. It stars Zhang Kaili and Li Xuejian. "Ke wang" in Chinese means "aspiration", "yearning", thus the theme of the series concerns human nature. "Ke wang" tells a story of human nature with the era's background, revealing people's eager desire for traditional values, for love, friendship, and a good life.

Among the most watched Chinese television shows in history, the series has been known to achieved unprecedented television ratings and viewers in China.

== Plot ==
The series is set in the age of "Wenge" (the Cultural Revolution), concerning the love story of two couples. The main character is called Liu Huifang.

== Reputation and awards ==
- "Excellent Drama Series": Golden Eagle Award, 1991
- "Best actor": Golden Eagle Award, Li Xuejian, 1991
- "Best actress": Golden Eagle Award, Zhang Kaili, 1991
- "Excellent long TV series": Flying Apsaras Award, 1991

== Influence ==
This series was well known as a historic milestone in the development of Chinese TV series.
