= Han Liu Bang =

- DVD cover art
- 汉刘邦
- Genre: Historical drama
- Starring: Liu Wenzhi; Zhang Lin; Yu Xiaohui
- Opening theme: "Song of the Great Wind" (大风歌) by Sun Jian
- Ending theme: "Heroes Through the Ages" (千古英雄浪涛沙) performed by Han Lei
- Country of origin: China
- Original language: Mandarin
- No. of episodes: 35

Production
- Production location: China
- Running time: ≈45 minutes per episode

Original release
- Network: CCTV; Changchun Film Studio; Xuzhou Municipal People's Government

Han Liu Bang (汉刘邦) is a Chinese historical television series based on the life of Liu Bang (Emperor Gaozu), the founder of the Han dynasty, starring Liu Wenzhi as the titular character. The series was first broadcast on CCTV in China in 1998.

== List of episodes ==
The 35-episode series follows the events in Liu Bang's life: his humble origin as a low-ranking government officer; his role in the rebellion against the Qin dynasty; his power struggle with Xiang Yu in the Chu–Han Contention; his enthronement; the major events of his reign; and finally his death.

#	Rough translation of title (in English)	Original title (in Chinese)
1	Chief of Sishui	泗水亭长
2	Uprising on Mount Mangdang	芒砀起事
3	Supporting the Duke of Pei	拥立沛公
4	Agreement to resist Qin	相约抗秦
5	Liu Bang and Xiang Yu make a pledge	刘项盟誓
6	Advancing to Guanzhong	兵进关中
7	Xianyang - Fall of Qin	咸阳灭秦
8	Three Conditions	约法三章
9	Feast at Hong Gate	鸿门赴宴
10	Temporarily agreeing to be King of Han	屈就汉王
11	Burning the galley roads	火烧栈道
12	Han Xin joins Han	韩信归汉
13	Appointing a general	金坛拜将
14	Building an army	厉兵秣马
15	Passing through Chencang secretly	暗渡陈仓
16	Defeat at Pengcheng	兵败彭城
17	Persuading Ying Bu to surrender	说降英布
18	Defending Xingyang	固守荥阳
19	Eliminating Fan Zeng by strategy	智除范增
20	Escaping from danger in Xingyang	荥阳脱险
21	Battle of Chenggao	争战成皋
22	Engagement at Guangwu	对峙广武
23	Treaty of Hong Canal	鸿沟议和
24	Battle of Gaixia	垓下大战
25	Suicide at Wu River	乌江自刎
26	Proclaimed Emperor at Dingtao	定陶称帝
27	Capturing Han Xin by trickery	诱擒韩信
28	Besieged at Baideng	兵困白登
29	Moving the capital to Xianyang	迁都咸阳
30	Internal woes and external threats	内忧外患
31	Preparing for a rebellion	勘力叛乱
32	Dispute over the succession	废长风波
33	Attacking Ying Bu	征讨英布
34	Song of Great Wind	高歌大风
35	Death of Liu Bang	刘邦之死

== Cast ==
- Liu Wenzhi as Liu Bang
- Yu Xiaohui as Lü Zhi
- Wang Gang as Zhang Liang
- Li Hongwei as Han Xin
- Cheng Wenkuan as Xiao He
- Zhu Na as Consort Qi
- Zhang Lin as Xiang Yu
- Zhou Lu as Consort Yu
- Liu Zhongyuan as Fan Zeng
