= The Holy Pearl =

2011 Chinese television series

- Intertitle
- Also known as: 女媧傳說之靈珠
- Genre: Action; Drama; Chinese mythology
- Written by: Ma Guangyuan
- Directed by: Cai Jing Sheng
- Starring: Gillian Chung; Purba Rgyal; Patrick Tam; Guo Zhen Ni
- Opening theme: Ai Dao Wan Nian (爱到万年) by Purba Rgyal and Liu Ting Yu
- Ending theme: Ai Dao Wan Nian (爱到万年) by Purba Rgyal and Liu Ting Yu
- Country of origin: China
- Original language: Chinese
- No. of episodes: 32 (VCD/DVD version); 36 (Broadcast version)

Production
- Executive producer: Chen Mei Lin
- Producer: Zhou Li
- Production location: China

Original release
- Network: ZJSTV
- Release: 2011 – 2011

The Holy Pearl
- Promotional poster
- Traditional Chinese: 女媧傳說之靈珠
- Simplified Chinese: 女娲传说之灵珠
Transcriptions
Standard Mandarin
- Hanyu Pinyin: Nǚwā Chuánshuō Zhī Língzhū

The Holy Pearl is a 2011 Chinese television series starring Gillian Chung as the daughter of an archaeologist. She travels back in time only to discovers she is the reincarnation of a warrior-priestess. She teams up with a human-dragon hybrid to recover a broken magical vase. The series took elements from the Japanese manga series Inuyasha, but the main protagonist is the modern girl and not the half-demon from the past.

== Synopsis ==
Many years ago Mo Yin, the human form of the goddess Tengshe, was jealous of her sister Xian Yue's popularity with the humans they protected and the love she received from the king. Mo Yin colluded with the demon lord Shi You Ming to kill her sister Xian Yue. The act upset the balance between the divine, human and demon worlds, giving demons an upper hand.

In the present, Xian Yue's reincarnation, Ding Yao, is an average college student majoring in history. While helping her father, an archaeologist, she comes across the Nine-Star Wheel, accidentally triggering it causing her to go back 3500 years into the past to Nanyue.

The king of Nanyue wishes to marry her upon seeing her resemblance to Xian Yue. Ding Yao flees the palace only to be attacked by demons who are after the Demon-Subduing Vase. She hides in a tomb where the half-breed Wen Tian is held prisoner and subsequently frees him and saves her. The Demon-Subduing Vase appears mysteriously from a clay figurine Ding Yao carries.

Unfortunately, Ding Yao accidentally shatters the vase. Now she set on a mission alongside Wen Tian to reforge the vase using the holy pearls that Nüwa left behind from creating the human world.

== Cast ==
- Gillian Chung as Ding Yao （丁瑶）: a normal college student who is taken back to the past by accidentally triggering the Nine-Star Wheel. Chung also portrays Xian Yue （仙乐）; Ding Yao's previous life and former Grand Priestess of Nan Yue.
- Purba Rgyal as Wen Tian （问天）: a half-dragon demon with human blood. He was sealed and imprisoned in the ancient tomb for 20 years until freed by Ding Yao. Wen Tian and Xian Yue were lovers until they were tricked by Shi Youming.
- Patrick Tam as Rong Di （荣狄）: the King of Nan Yue Country. He was deeply in love with Xian Yue, but his feelings for her were unrequited. After meeting Ding Yao, he is determined to marry her.
- Guo Zhenni as Mu Lian （慕莲）: a shrine maiden and Guardian of Nuwa's Tomb. Her whole village was killed by Hu Ji. She joins Ding Yao and Wen Tian on their quest in order to take revenge. Mu Lian falls in love with Wu Dao, having saved her life many times.
- Sun Xing as Shi You Ming: a demon who was infatuated with Xian Yue. He was responsible for Xian Yue's death, Wen Tian's imprisonment, the massacre of Mu Lian's village and many more
- Jiang Yi as Wu Dao （无道）: Wen Tian's half brother and full dragon demon as well as the leader of the Dragon Clan. He is in love with Yu Die.
- Li Qian as Yu Die （雨蝶）: the princess of Shu Country who ran away from home. She met Wu Dao when he was wounded and helped heal him. She has been following him ever since.
- Liu Tingyu as Mo Yin （魔音）: the current Grand Priestess of Nan Yue. She loved Rong Di dearly but wasn't loved back, as a result, she harbors deep hatred for her sister, Xian Yue.
- TAE as Wei Liao （卫辽）: Rong Di's younger brother and Nan Yue's former Great General. He is also Hu Ji's lover.
- Zhu Ziwen as Ting Qin （听琴）: Mo Yin's apprentice
- Liu Naping as Hu Ji （胡姬）: a minion of Shi You Ming and Wei Liao's lover.
- Shu Yaoxuan as Ding Mian: Ding Yao's father and a prominent professor in archaeology.
- Chen Jiaxin as Feng Huang （凤凰）: the only daughter of the Heavenly King who resided on the Heavenly Mountain.
- Li Yixin as Wushan Guipo: the ghostly elder of Mount Wu who was responsible for Xian Yue's resurrection
