= Single Princesses and Blind Dates =

- Promo poster
- Also known as: Princess Single Blind Date In Mind, 單身公主相親記
- 单身公主相亲记
- Genre: Romance, Comedy
- Written by: Gu Yi 顾奕; Cai De Míng 蔡德明; Mí Cha 迷茶
- Directed by: Chen Ming Zhang 陈铭章
- Starring: Jimmy Lin 林志颖; Zhao Liang 赵子靓; Dylan Kuo 郭品超
- Opening theme: You Are The One by Jimmy Lin 林志颖
- Ending theme: Orange Balloon 橘色气球 by Vivi Jiang 江映蓉
- Country of origin: China
- Original language: Mandarin
- No. of series: 1
- No. of episodes: 30

Production
- Executive producers: Ouyang Chang Lin 欧阳常林; Zhou Lin 周琳; James Yao 姚嘉
- Production locations: Shanghai, China
- Running time: 45 minutes
- Production companies: Hunan TV and Shanghai 展杰文化艺术有限公司

Original release
- Network: Hunan TV
- Release: 17 September – 1 October 2010

Related
- Summer's Desire 泡沫之夏; Momo Love 桃花小妹

Single Princesses and Blind Dates (simplified Chinese: 单身公主相亲记; traditional Chinese: 單身公主相親記; pinyin: Dan Sheng Gong Zhu Xiang Qing Ji) is a 2010 Mainland China romance and comedy serial drama starring Taiwanese actor singer Jimmy Lin as the male lead, Chinese actress Zhao Liang as the female lead with Taiwanese actor, singer, model Dylan Kuo as the second male lead. It is adapted from a popular novel of the same name. Filming began on April 1, 2010 in Shanghai, China and ended in June 2010. The series began broadcasting on Chinese channel Hunan TV from September 17, 2010 on Sunday and Saturday's at 10:30 to 11:30 with 2 episodes airing per day, ending on October 2, 2010 with 30 episodes total. The series with English subtitles can also be seen on web channel Hulu.com .

== Synopsis ==
Le Tong Tong (Zhao Liang) had her dream wedding all planned, she invited all her relatives and friends but nearing the day of their wedding day her fiancé dumps her for her rival co-worker. To make matters worse the incident was caught on a surveillance camera for all to witness her embarrassment. She soon has further heartbreak when her former fiancé marries his new girlfriend right away. Not wanting to lose face or feel defeated to her former fiancé and love rival she and her friends set our to find her a new husband to be on a series of blind dates.

== Cast ==
=== Main cast ===
- Jimmy Lin 林志颖 as Ji Fan 纪凡
- Zhao Liang 赵子靓 as Le Tong Tong 乐彤彤
- Dylan Kuo 郭品超 as Fang Yan 饰方

=== Supporting cast ===
- Hong Xiao Ling 洪小玲 as Kelly 凯莉
- Zheng Kai 郑恺 as Li Xiao Yao 李逍遥
- Chen Yan Fei 陈彦妃 as Ba Mei 八妹
- Lei Jia Yin 雷佳音 as Chang Sheng 常盛

== Soundtrack ==
- You Are The One by Jimmy Lin 林志颖
- Color 颜色 by Jimmy Lin 林志颖
- Orange Balloon 橘色气球 by Vivi Jiang 江映蓉
- Clone 复制人 by Vivi Jiang 江映蓉
- I Do Not know 我不知道 by Sugar Tang 唐笑
- September 九月 by Sugar Tang 唐笑

== Production Team ==
- Producers:
  - Ouyang Chang Lin 欧阳常林
  - James Yao 姚嘉
  - Zhou Lin 周琳
- Supervising Producers:
  - Cheng Boji 盛伯骥
  - Zhu Deqiang 朱德强
  - Zhang Yong 张勇
- Director:
  - Chen Ming Zhang 陈铭章
- Screenwriter:
  - Gu Yi 顾奕
