= Housing (TV series) =

- Also known as: 安居
- Genre: Modern drama Metropolitan
- Directed by: Zhang Yongxin (張永新)
- Starring: Wang Zhi Fei (王志飞); Fu Jing (傅晶); Cheng Yu (程煜); Li Xiaofeng (李晓峰); Lai Xi (来喜); Liu Mintao (刘敏涛)
- Country of origin: China
- Original language: Chinese
- No. of episodes: 33

Production
- Production location: China Baotou
- Editor: Zhao Dongling (赵冬苓 )
- Running time: 45 minutes (approx.)
- Production company: Shandong Television Media Group (山东影视传媒集团)

Original release
- Network: CCTV-1 (央视一套)
- Release: September 20 – October 15, 2016

Housing (Chinese: 安居), is a highly popular 2016 Chinese TV series produced by Shandong Television Media Group. The TV series, based on the events of shanty town renewal in Beiliang, Baotou, Inner Mongolia autonomous region, has brought the project back into the limelight.

== Background ==
Beiliang, Donghe District, Baotou, is an area considered to be the cradle of the city. More than 90 percent of the buildings in Beiliang were built around 1949. Beiliang Community in Baotou is home to about 120,000 people living in slums. Many have been there for tens of years. Some share only one room between different generations, with small beds near large ones and beds near kitchen ranges. Once being the largest area of shanty housing in China.

After Chinese Vice Premier Li Keqiang visits the home of resident in Beiliang Community, a shantytown in Baotou, on Feb. 3, 2013. Beiliang started the shantytown clearance project in 2013 and has successfully completed the work. Houses covering an area of 430 million square meters were demolished and 109,000 residents were rehoused.

== Story ==
The series is based on the events of a shanty house clearance project in Beiliang, Baotou, Inner Mongolia autonomous region. Housing tells the stories taking place during the Beiliang shanty house clearance project, which is one of the key livelihood projects of Baotou, Inner Mongolia. It depicts humanity, unity and close ties between people.

== Broadcast ==
Channel	Location	Date	Times
CCTV-1	China	September 20, 2016	Sunday to Friday 20:05

== Music ==
Title	Singer
Ballad of My Homeland "故乡的歌谣"	Jamyang Dolma
"知你冷暖,懂你悲欢"	Reno Wang

== Awards and nominations ==
Year	Award	Category	Nominated work	Result	Ref.
2018	31st Flying Apsaras Award	Outstanding Television Series (Modern)	Housing	Won	
2018	31st Flying Apsaras Award	Outstanding Director	Zhang Yongxin	Nominated	
