= Sun Zi Bing Fa Yu San Shi Liu Ji =

- DVD cover art
- 孙子兵法与三十六计
- Genre: Historical drama
- Written by: Zhang Huili
- Directed by: Zhang Zhisheng; Zhang Huili
- Presented by: Yue Luyi
- Starring: Qiu Yongli; Yang Hongwu
- Opening theme: "The Thirty-six Stratagems" (三十六计) by Liu Zilin
- Ending theme: "Leave Your Friendship Behind in Your Hometown" (把友情留在故乡) by Liu Zilin and Liu Chunhong
- Composer: Guo Jianyong
- Country of origin: China
- Original language: Mandarin
- No. of episodes: 36

Production
- Producers: Huang Hanchong; Yang Saiguang; Wang Guohui
- Production location: China
- Cinematography: Zhang Zhisheng
- Editors: Li Lugang; Wu Xuesong
- Running time: ≈45 minutes per episode
- Production companies: CCTV; Shandong TV; Shandong Sanguan Film Production; Agricultural Bank of China

Original release
- Release: 2000

Sun Zi Bing Fa Yu San Shi Liu Ji (孙子兵法与三十六计; "Sun Tzu's The Art of War and the Thirty-Six Stratagems"), is a 2000 Chinese television historical series romanticising the life of the military strategist Sun Bin, who lived in the fourth century BC during the Warring States period of ancient China.

== Synopsis ==
During the Warring States period, the reclusive philosopher Guiguzi takes Sun Bin and Pang Juan as his students and trains them in military strategy. He also passes the long-lost military treatise The Art of War to Sun Bin only.

Both Sun Bin and Pang Juan later serve under the king of Wei. When Pang Juan is caught in a stalemate while leading Wei forces into battle against invaders from Chu, Sun Bin uses a stratagem he learnt from The Art of War to defeat the enemy. Pang Juan, secretly jealous of Sun Bin, frames Sun Bin for treason and causes him to be face-tattooed and crippled.

Pang Juan's adviser Gongsun Yue, who has a crush on Zhongli Qiu, secretly tells Sun Bin that Pang Juan is the mastermind behind his downfall. Sun Bin pretends to be insane and destroys the records of everything he has learnt from Guiguzi. Zhongli Qiu, hoping that Sun Bin is feigning insanity, confesses her feelings to him but he continues to put up the pretence and manages to fool Pang Juan.

Zhongli Qiu's sister Zhongli Chun hears of Sun Bin's plight so she travels to Sun Bin's native state of Qi and begs the Qi general Tian Ji to help her save Sun Bin. Tian Ji sends his followers to save Sun Bin and smuggle him out of Wei to Qi, where Sun Bin attracts King Wei of Qi's attention and becomes a military leader alongside Tian Ji, leading Qi forces into battle against their enemies.

== Cast ==
- Qiu Yongli as Sun Bin
- Yang Hongwu as Pang Juan
- Zhang Xiaolei as Zhongli Chun
- Zhang Zijian as Gongsun Yue
- Gu Hongwei as Zhongli Qiu
- Han Fuli as Tian Ji
- Zhang Huili as King Hui of Wei
- Liu Yulin as King Huai of Chu
- Huang Ji as Guiguzi
- Xiao Daiqing as Qin Hua
- Jiao Tiyi as Zou Ji
- Sui Juanjuan as Zou Ji's wife
- Gu Hongwei as Zhongli Qiu
- Yizhen as King Xuan of Qi
- Liu Fengxue as Pang Cong
- Gao Baobao as Meiyu
- Ding Lihua as the Queen Dowager of Qi
- Shi Zhonghong as Tian Guo
- Wang Zhigang as the Crown Prince of Han
- Zhang Hanying as King Wei of Qi
- Dai Tian'en as King Xuanhui of Han
- Zhang Jianhua as Wei Bo
- Sun Jianqiu as Wei Zhong
- Li Fangping as Wei Shu
- Li Liang as Xiaoshi

== List of episodes ==
Each episode is named after one of the Thirty-Six Stratagems.

| # | Rough translation of title (in English) | Original title (in Chinese) |
|---|---|---|
| 1 | Remove the ladder when the enemy has ascended to the roof | 上屋抽梯 |
| 2 | Hide a knife behind a smile | 笑里藏刀 |
| 3 | Feign madness but keep your balance | 假痴不癫 |
| 4 | Slough off the cicada's golden shell | 金蝉脱壳 |
| 5 | Sacrifice the plum tree to preserve the peach tree | 李代桃僵 |
| 6 | Besiege Wei to rescue Zhao | 围魏救赵 |
| 7 | Defeat the enemy by capturing their chief | 擒贼擒王 |
| 8 | Leisurely await for the laboured | 以逸待劳 |
| 9 | Create something from nothing | 无中生有 |
| 10 | Kill with a borrowed knife | 借刀杀人 |
| 11 | Loot a burning house | 趁火打劫 |
| 12 | Deceive the heavens to cross the ocean | 瞒天过海 |
| 13 | Replace the beams with rotten timbers | 偷梁换柱 |
| 14 | Obtain safe passage to conquer the State of Guo | 假道伐虢 |
| 15 | Make a sound in the east, then strike in the west | 声东击西 |
| 16 | The empty fort strategy | 空城计 |
| 17 | Let the enemy's own spy sow discord in the enemy camp | 反间计 |
| 18 | Deck the tree with false blossoms | 树上开花 |
| 19 | Tossing out a brick to get a jade gem | 抛砖引玉 |
| 20 | Disturb the water and catch a fish | 混水摸鱼 |
| 21 | Sneak through the passage of Chencang | 暗渡陈仓 |
| 22 | The beauty trap | 美人计 |
| 23 | Make the host and the guest exchange roles | 反客为主 |
| 24 | Point at the mulberry tree while cursing the locust tree | 指桑骂槐 |
| 25 | Chain stratagems | 连环计 |
| 26 | Befriend a distant state while attacking a neighbour | 远交近攻 |
| 27 | Stomp the grass to scare the snake | 打草惊蛇 |
| 28 | Entice the tiger to leave its mountain lair | 调虎离山 |
| 29 | In order to capture, one must let loose | 欲擒故纵 |
| 30 | Borrow a corpse to resurrect the soul | 借尸还魂 |
| 31 | Remove the firewood from under the pot | 釜底抽薪 |
| 32 | Take the opportunity to pilfer a goat | 顺手牵羊 |
| 33 | Shut the door to catch the thief | 关门捉贼 |
| 34 | Inflict injury on oneself to win the enemy's trust | 苦肉计 |
| 35 | Watch the fires burning across the river | 隔岸观火 |
| 36 | If all else fails, retreat | 走为上 |
