= Only You (2002 TV series) =

Chinese television series

Only You
(非你不可)
Mandarin Pinyin	Fei Ni Bu Ke
Main Cast	Ruby Lin Chen Kun
Production Date	2001
Year Release	2002
Genre	Fictional
Episodes	20

Only You (非你不可) is a Chinese television series. The storyline centers around an inevitable love triangle that unraveled during a Beijing summer. It stars Taiwanese actress Ruby Lin and Mainland actor Chen Kun.

== Main Characters Summary ==
- Ruby Lin as Si Jia Yi – Sunny girl who sells dolls as a living and has a big crush on Ke Lei.
- Chen Kun as Ke Lei – Is Si Jia Yi's high school friend and loves music.
- Yang Xue as Su Yan – works in the hospital and is Ke Lei's girlfriend.
- Jin Li Li as Ke Qin – Ke Lei's mother
