= In That Distant Place (TV series) =

- 在那遥远的地方
- Genre: Drama
- Written by: Wang Hao; Lei Xianhe; Zhong Jimin
- Directed by: Yu Zhong (俞钟)
- Starring: Li Youbin; Yin Tao; Shen Xiaohai; Wu Jian; Song Wenfei; Gu Yan; Ji Ta
- Ending theme: 那时候
- Composer: Wang Xian
- Country of origin: China
- Original language: Mandarin
- No. of episodes: 29

Production
- Executive producer: Wang Fulin
- Producer: Liu Yanjun
- Cinematography: Li Yaozong
- Editor: Fu Zhengyi
- Running time: 45 minutes per episode

Original release
- Network: CCTV
- Release: 26 July 2009

In That Distant Place (simplified Chinese: 在那遥远的地方; traditional Chinese: 在那遙遠的地方; pinyin: Zài nà yáoyuǎn de dìfāng) is a 2009 Chinese drama television series. The TV series is set in the 1970s during and just after the Cultural Revolution. It follows four childhood friends - three males and one female - as they joined the Kunlun Division of the People's Liberation Army and are posted to Ürümqi and the Kunlun Mountains. The series chronicles their army and love lives as two of the males become border guards and the female a combat medic.

The series debuted on CCTV-1 on 26 July 2009 and comprises 29 episodes.

== Plot ==
The series follows four childhood friends - Yuan Ying, Ding Haotian, Fang Yang and Lü Qiang - as they join the Kunlun Division of the PLA in the early 1970s. All four are idealistic young people looking to defend their country. Yuan Ying, the only girl, is the sole daughter of a middle-aged couple of a military background; however, she is really the biological daughter of her adopted father's former military colleague, now the Commandant of the Kunlun Division, Wei Tie.

The series follows the love and army lives of the four friends, especially between Ding Haotian, Lü Qiang and Yuan Ying. Ding Haotian and Lü Qiang become border guards, Yuan Ying becomes a medic and Fang Yang a driver. It also deals with Yuan Ying's changing relationship with her true parents and wilful sister Wei Jie, although none are aware of their true ties at the series' start.

The series ends with Yuan Ying sacrificing herself to save natives during a snow-storm and the subsequent avalanche.

Although the series is set in the 1970s, the series contains very little reference to the Cultural Revolution.

== Main Cast (simplified Chinese) ==
- Li Youbin (李幼斌) as Commandant Wei Tie (韦铁)
  - Commandant of the PLA's Kunlun Division. He gives away his elder daughter, Yuan Ying, to a fellow army mate years ago after discovering the latter was rendered infertile on battlefield. He hides his love for his daughters behind a mask of sternness.
- Yin Tao (殷桃) as Yuan Ying (袁鹰)
  - The protagonist of the series: an idealistic, warm-hearted girl who eventually becomes a combat medic. She is well liked by soldiers and colleagues at the Kunlun Division alike. She is involved in a relationship with Lü Qiang and is really the daughter of Commandant Wei Tie, although she only learns the truth toward the series' end.
- Wu Jian (吴健) as Lü Qiang (吕强)
  - One of the three male buddies featured in the series. He ends up as a border guard at Kunlun Mountains, which he hates, preferring to stay at the Kunlun Division HQ. He loves Yuan Ying but eventually breaks up with her to be with Wei Jie, the Commandant's daughter.
- Shen Xiaohai (沈晓海) as Ding Haotian (丁浩天)
  - A tough but idealistic young man who is secretly in love with childhood friend Yuan Ying. He, like his friend Lü Qiang, ends up as a border guard at Kunlun Mountains after signing up with the PLA and becomes the guards' chief cook. Unlike Lü, he learns to love his job. He is also a poet.
- Gu Yan (顾燕) as Gui Hongyun (桂红云)
  - PLA doctor, wife of Commandant Wei Tie and mother to Wei Jie and Yuan Ying. She is prejudiced against Yuan Ying at the start of the series but her attitude changes totally when she realizes Yuan is her long-lost daughter.
- Song Wenfei (宋汶霏) as Wei Jie (韦洁)
  - Commandant Wei Tie and army doctor Gui Hongyun's daughter. She is the younger sister of Yuan Ying (although neither knows this until well into the second half of the series). Wei Jie is somewhat spoilt and hard to get along with. She eventually marries Lü Qiang, although she used to adore Ding Haotian's gift as a poet.
- Ji Ta (姬他) as Fang Yang (方扬)
  - The third of the three buddies at the series' start. He is the most street smart of the three, and ends up being a HQ truck driver. He sides with Ding Haotian against Lü Qiang after the two's relationship deteriorates.

== Reception ==
In That Distant Place was very well received during its premiere on CCTV-1, averaging around 6.27 points in viewership. Mainstream newspapers and audiences alike gave high praise to the series. Audiences found the kinship between Yuan Ying and her parents particularly moving. This was the third high-profile TV series made by actor Li Youbin, who played Commandant Wei Tie, Yuan Ying's father. Actor Wu Jian, who played Lü Qiang, was also singled out for his outstanding performance as antagonist.
