= Jin Mao Xiang =

Chinese television series

- Also known as: Yunzhuan Tianxia
- Genre: Business drama, family drama
- Opening theme: Yuni Tongzai (与你同在) performed by Liu Xin and Liu Rui
- Country of origin: China
- Original language: Mandarin
- No. of episodes: 43

Production
- Production location: China
- Running time: 45 minutes per episode

Original release
- Network: CCTV (China); ATV (Hong Kong)

Jin Mao Xiang
- Chinese: 金茂祥
Transcriptions
Standard Mandarin
- Hanyu Pinyin: Jīn Mào Xiáng

Jin Mao Xiang is a Chinese television series first broadcast on CCTV in China in 2004. It was produced in collaboration by a number of companies, including the Communication University of China. The series was aired on ATV in 2009 in Hong Kong under the title Yunzhuan Tianxia (運轉天下; literally: "Luck Changes the World").

== Story ==
The story begins with the Che family business in the Qing Dynasty. The head of the business was mother Yugui. She had fixed her daughter Jiaoyan's marriage so that she end up with someone who was more financially stable. The daughter however was extremely unhappy since the fixed husband was fat and unattractive. The daughter was actually in love with the poor coolie boy A'long. However society would not allow a girl of reputable social status to marry a boy of low social status. The oldest brother of the family Che Weiren later committed a murder. He has been spoiled by the family riches. When the government was looking for the murderer, the coolie boy A'long innocently admitted to the crime so the brother didn't have to go to prison.

Eventually the house got weak in morale. A fisherman named Gao Lixiang came in to help the Che family business. At first he was looked down upon due to his low society status. Soon he figured out how to dye clothes. He single handed won an imperial clothing competition by making through the obstacle course with his dyed clothes. The Che family was surprised that a simple fisherman could beat the business.

Then one day a major fire broke out in a restaurant and Lixiang saved a daughter and a westerner from the crisis. The daughter turned out to be from the competing Wang family business. She tried to lure him into their family claiming the Che family treats him unfairly. After a number of business competitions he was gaining more respect in the Che family. Eventually the siblings got jealous and tried to get Lixiang kicked out of the household. Eventually the mother made Lixiang the head of the business, since he was most capable.

Eventually the business was in trouble from all the competition. But the westerner who was saved in the fire came back with a bunch of goods from the west such as magnifying glass and music boxes. They started selling western goods and the business improved again, since no one else have seen these merchandise. Later the family went into a feud between the oldest son Che Weiren and Lixiang. In setting Lixiang up, the oldest son killed an outsider, Bai Biao, who later turned out to be his own genetic father.

After a number of twists Lixiang was promoted to be the chairman of the business association above all businesses, but he was put in the chairman position because the government official liked his former fiancée Yang Danping. The oldest brother in the family soon developed a deep jealousy over the Lixiang's success who now owns his family business, his girlfriend Xu Xiaoman and his mother's trust. He sank into depression with opium addictions, and was later bribed by a government official to sell out his whole family business in exchange for unlimited opium. The mother of the family ended up in prison having been set up by the government officials. But her kids did not stand by her since they experienced too much hardship during their childhood. Lixiang ended up rescuing the family business, but soon finds the business to be unmanageable. Worse is that the mother who ran the business indirectly murdered his parents earlier. The story experience more twists and turns eventually to include the death of Qing government officials.

== Cast ==
Cast	Role	Description
Eric Wang	Gao Lixiang 高立翔	Main character. Capable, strong individually, despite being born from a poor background. He constantly insist that luck is always on his side.
Li Xiaoran	Xu Xiaoman 徐小曼	Financially well off Christian missionary girl. Understood westerners. He also liked Lixiang.
Gao Yuan	Che Yugui 车玉贵	Mother of the Che family. Head of the household and business.
Tammy Chen	Yang Danping 杨丹萍	Taiwan actress. She was interested in Lixiang.
Shen Xiaohai	Che Weiren 车维仁	Was the oldest and most unwanted son in the family. Became unhappy and depressed since he was constantly useless in the family business.
Yu Rongguang	Bai Biao 白彪	Turned out to be the real father of Che Weiren.
Zhao Liang	Xu Zhanhong 徐展鸿	
Tao Huimin	Gao Baomei 高宝妹	Was the true mother of Lixiang. Was later poisoned to death.
Lei Kesheng	Father Che 车老爷	Head of the Che family
Kym Ng	Wang Qiang 王蔷	
Wang Yixuan	Che Jiaoyan 车娇艳	Daughter of the Che family
Xing Minshan	He Yilong 贺奕龙	The honorable government official who was later set up to be killed by corrupted government officials.
Yue Yueli	Qu Yunting 曲云亭	Father of Lixiang
Qin Yan	Wang Siyuan 王思远	
Dong Yang	Che Weide 车维德	The youngest son of the Che family who loved Yingzi. He became mentally ill.
Lin Jieni	Yingzi / Hua Ruxiu 英子 / 花如秀	The girl who was neglected by the Che family and died earlier. Another girl Hua Ruxiu later came back to the Che family, and looked identical to the girl who died earlier. The mother of the family thought she was haunted by a ghost.
Li Ming	Chang Feng 常峰	
Yang Sheng	Lu Qiankun 陆乾坤	
Zhang Qi	Chen Haoliang 陈浩良	
Tie He	A'long 阿龙	He confessed to crime he didn't commit and went to prison for the oldest son of the Che family. Because of this he went from low coolie social status to high rank in the family, once he was released from prison.
Gao Sen	Yang Bo 杨波	
Fang Xiaoyue	Zhou Wei 周薇	
Liu Fang	Li Jinhao 李金好	
Zhou Yulai	Du 老杜	
Han Zhenhua	Yu Sihai 于四海	
Mi Yang	Che Yulan 车玉兰	
Zhang Jiajun	Master Zhou 周大人	
Zhang Wenyi	Master Qi 齐大人	
Liu Xinyi	Qu Xiaowu 曲孝伍	
Meng Long	Master 师爷	
Zhao Le	Wuzhen district government official	
Zhang Guoqing	District grandfather	
Xiaohei	Zhou sing 周兴	
Song Qing	Jia Hong 贾宏	
Qian Kun	Panther 黑豹	
Cheng Zhi	Wolf 野狼	
Daqiao	Gordon 高登	Western merchant who sought fortune

== Cuisine reference ==
The show featured a dish called Squirrel whole jumping fish (松鼠活魚) from Wuzhen. The fish is cooked in a rather cruel way where the head is alive while the body is fried. If cooked correctly however, the mouth continues to move/talk even after the dish is finished. It does not contain any squirrel contrary to the name.
