= The Han Triumph =

Chinese television series

- DVD cover
- Also known as: Wind Ode; Da Feng Ge; Da Han Shengshi

Chinese name
- Traditional Chinese: 大風歌 / 大漢盛世
- Simplified Chinese: 大风歌 / 大汉盛世
Transcriptions
Standard Mandarin
- Hanyu Pinyin: Dà Fēng Gē / Dà Hàn Shèngshì
- Genre: Historical drama
- Written by: Li Shuoru; Zhang Weijia
- Directed by: Huang Jianzhong
- Presented by: Fu Yingtian; Zhang Haibo; Li Yongsheng; Hu Guangrong; Ning Cai
- Starring: Ray Lui; Wang Ji; Liu Mu; Zhang Guangbei; Chen Wei; Li Qingxiang
- Opening theme: Da Feng Ge (大风歌) performed by Ray Lui
- Ending theme: Ningyuan (宁愿) performed by Ray Lui and his wife
- Composer: Liu Zhihong
- Country of origin: China
- Original language: Mandarin
- No. of episodes: 44

Production
- Executive producers: Zhang Haibo; Bai Chen; Zhou Peng
- Producers: Li Shuoru; He Gang; Bai Chen; Chen Yanyan
- Production location: China
- Running time: 45 minutes per episode
- Production companies: Hai Run Movies & TV Production; Hai De Culture Media; Inner Mongolia Film Studio

Original release
- Network: CCTV-8
- Release: 17 December 2011

The Han Triumph, also known as Wind Ode, is a Chinese television series based on historical events in the early Han dynasty, beginning with the founding of the dynasty by Liu Bang (Emperor Gao) after his triumph over Xiang Yu, and the events leading to the reign of Liu Heng (Emperor Wen). Directed by Huang Jianzhong, the series starred Ray Lui, Wang Ji, Liu Mu, Zhang Guangbei, Chen Wei and Li Qingxiang in the leading roles. It was first broadcast on CCTV-8 in China on 17 December 2011.

== Cast ==
- Ray Lui as Emperor Gaozu of Han
- Wang Ji as Empress Lü Zhi
- Liu Mu as Emperor Wen of Han
  - Su Yanzheng as teenage Emperor Wen
  - Wang Liang as child Emperor Wen
- Zhang Guangbei as Han Xin
- Luo Yinan as Empress Dou
- Zhang Han as Zhang Shizhi
- Chen Wei as Empress Dowager Bo
- Lei Zhenyu as Bo Zhao
- Wang Tao as Jia Yi
- Li Qingxiang as Zhou Bo
- Wang Hui as Chen Ping
- Mao Junjie as Princess Yuan of Lu
- Zhang Di as Emperor Hui of Han
- Xia Lu as Empress Zhang Yan
  - Zhang Chuqian as young Empress Zhang
- Zhang Tong as Shen Yiji
- Zhang Yuqi as Chunyu Tiying
- Liu Yuxin as Concubine Qi
- Zhou Shuai as Liu Zhang
- Ai Lisen as Lady Tao
- Zhu Decheng as Fan Kuai
- Lan Lan as Lü Xu
- Zhu Xiaochun as Guan Ying
- Lin Daxin as Xiao He
- Li Yonggui as Lu Gu
- Zhang Jinhe as Li Xi
- Yang Fengyu as Liu Mao
- Zhao Dongbo as Song Chang
- Jia Wei as Zhang Wu
  - Guo Shengran as young Zhang Wu
- Tu Men as Modu Chanyu
- Wang Yining as Xiangrui
- Dai Xiaoxu as Kai Zhang
- Gang Yi as Deng Tong
- Cai Hongxiang as Chunyu Yi
- Wei Zheng as Liu Ruyi
  - Tan Qiaochu as young Liu Ruyi
- Fan Ying as Liu Qi
  - Xiaopidan as young Liu Qi
- Li Xiaofeng as Chao Cuo
- Miao Qiang as Zhou Yafu
- Fu Hongjun as Xiahou Ying
- Zhang Ke as Lü Chan
- Zhang Qizhi as Zhang Cang
- Yi Liqi as Lü Lu
- Liu Yan as Lü Qiang
- Zhou Zhonghe as Commandant Wang
- Kong Qingsan as You Da
- Hao Aimin as Liu Taigong
- Qian Meitong as Yu'er
- Ding Ning as Minnü
- Xu Min as Cao Shen
- Zhou Yulai as Shen Tujia
- Zang Jinsheng as Zhao Tuo
- Hu Zhentao as Liu Pi
- Zhu Jiasan as Liu Chang
  - Guo Yanze as young Liu Chang
- Li Qiang as Liu Ze
- Ding Ze'en as Liu Gong
- Jiang Xue as Bo Chan
- Jia Tong as Liu Hong
- Zhang Yi as Liu Xi
- Wang Hongsheng as Lü Shizhi
- Jiao Changdao as Yuan Gu
- Qian Bo as Chen Xian
- Fang Feilin as Hong Jiru
- Ruan Deqiang as Fan Kang
- Batu as Laoshang Chanyu
- Enchao as Right Virtuous Prince
- Sengge Renqin as Left Virtuous Prince
- Tongtemu'er as King of Loufan
- Qi Chaolumen as King of Hunxie
- Qi Chaoluhui as King of Xiutu
- Wu Ge as King of Baiyang
- Yang Miao as Rui'er
  - Huang Yucheng as young Rui'er
- Xiahou Bin as Zhongxingshuo
- Ji Li as Lü Ying
- Pan Li as Yinmei
- Dong Fufei as Yuehe
- Li Bing as Xiangnü
- Ma Xiaowei as Zhang Liang
- Huang Suying as Piaomu
- Song Yan as Marquis of Dongling
- Wang Shijun as Marquis of Guageng
- Li Baocheng as Ying Bu
- Zhong Ling as Li Guang
- Wang Moxi as Lady Yan
- Mu Xintong as Zhang Wu's wife
- Chai Zhixue as Wu Huang
- Wu Xu as Tian Li
- Xia Qing as Tian Li's wife
- Chu Jian as Chen San
- Luan Zuxun as Xiao Er
- Wang Guogang as Peng Yue
- Ma Yuliang as Mengzhong Official
- Liu Honglin as Governor Li
- Xing Hao as Pass official
- Zhao Guixiang as Min Zhongju
- Wang Chunyuan as Liu Changjiu
- Wei Fei as Shopkeeper Kang
- Yang Lei as Servant boy
- Wang Ningte as Wei Wei
- Da Li as Zhongli Mo
