= Ren Bishi (TV series) =

- Genre: Documentary
- Based on: Ren Bishi
- Directed by: Wang Baohua
- Starring: Wang Jian Wu Shanshan, Gu Yue, Sun Xiangyu, Wang Wufu, Guo Faceng
- Country of origin: China
- Original language: Chinese
- No. of episodes: 20

Production
- Producer: Huang Jinlong
- Cinematography: Di Jinsheng
- Running time: 45minutes

Original release
- Network: CCTV-1
- Release: 3 April 2008

Ren Bishi is a Chinese television series directed by Wang Baohua and starring Wang Jian, Wu Shanshan, Gu Yue, Sun Xiangyu, Wang Wufu, Guo Faceng.

== Plot summary ==
The series focuses on Ren Bishi's life from the mid-1920s to his death in 1950, documenting his development and achievements as a communist revolutionary.

== Actors ==
Actor	Role	Remarks
Wang Jian	Ren Bishi	
Wu Shanshan	Chen Congying	
Gu Yue	Mao Zedong	
Sun Xiangyu	Zhou Enlai	
Wang Wufu	Zhu De	
Guo Faceng	Liu Shaoqi	

== Theme Song ==
- The theme song "Bishi's Song" was sung by Huang Qiwen.

== Background ==
The series was produced in commemoration of Ren's 100th birthday.

== Controversies ==
In 2011, Ren Bishi's grandson Ren Xuning filed a lawsuit in Beijing against the series for infringing upon Ren Yuanyuan's (Bishi's son) name but was annulled as there were no resemblances to Ren Yuanyuan.
