= Taiwan 1895 =

- DVD cover art
- 台湾1895
- Genre: Historical drama
- Written by: Yang Xiaoxiong
- Directed by: Han Gang
- Presented by: Zhu Tong; Du Daning
- Starring: Li Xuejian; Chang Rong; Liu Dekai; Pan Hong; Liu Guanxiang; Gao Dongping; You Li; Liu Wenzhi
- Country of origin: China
- Original language: Mandarin
- No. of episodes: 36

Production
- Production location: China
- Running time: ≈45 minutes per episode

Original release
- Network: CCTV

Taiwan 1895 (台湾1895) is a Chinese historical television series based on the events that took place in Taiwan during the late Qing dynasty, such as the 1884–1885 Sino–French War and the 1895 Treaty of Shimonoseki. The series was directed by Han Gang and written by Yang Xiaoxiong. It was first broadcast in mainland China on CCTV in 2008.

== Cast ==
- Li Xuejian as Li Hongzhang
- Chang Rong as Liu Yongfu
- Liu Dekai as Liu Mingchuan
- Pan Hong as Empress Dowager Cixi
- Liu Guanxiang as the Guangxu Emperor
- Jing Minghua as Tang Jingsong
- Tan Tao as Li Jingfang
- Gao Dongping as Zhang Peilun
- Zhou Yemang as Weng Tonghe
- Liu Wenzhi as Zuo Zongtang
- Ji Qilin as Prince Gong
- You Li as Sun Yuwen
- Yao Gang as Ding Ruchang
- Zhu Ting as Li Ju'ou
- Li Wenwen as Liu Yingjiao
- Fang Ye as Wang Dusi
- Masser as Amédée Courbet
