= Angel Wings (TV series) =

- Promotional poster
- Also known as: Invisible Wings
- Genre: Modern, romance
- Written by: Zhang Lu
- Starring: Alyssa Chia
- Country of origin: China
- Original language: Mandarin
- No. of episodes: 50

Angel Wings
- Traditional Chinese: 隱形翅膀
- Simplified Chinese: 隐形翅膀
- Literal meaning: Honorable Beauty
Transcriptions
Standard Mandarin
- Hanyu Pinyin: Angel Wings

Angel Wings (simplified Chinese: 隐形翅膀; traditional Chinese: 隱形翅膀) is a 2016 Chinese drama television series starring Alyssa Chia.

== Plot ==
Alyssa Chia and Chiu Hsin-Chih play a married couple who have two children. During a robbery, their daughter is murdered. Chia's character discovers that the affair she had been having led to her daughter's death. After she adopts another daughter, she discovers that the girl is the murderer's daughter. The film portrays the revenge she takes.

== Cast ==
- Alyssa Chia as Zhao Min Na, a "heartless" stepmother. From the age of 20 until her 40s, Chia portrays the character.
- Chiu Hsin-Chih as Duan An Qi
- Wang Yi Zhe
- Vin Zhang
- Chang Cheng
- Zhang Yujian

== Production ==
Filming in China began in 2014, took several months, and wrapped up in 2015. A traffic collision scene was filmed in Wuxi in which Alyssa Chia sat behind a smashed windshield.
