= Butterfly Lovers (2007 TV series) =

- DVD cover art
- Traditional Chinese: 梁山伯與祝英台
- Simplified Chinese: 梁山伯与祝英台
- Literal meaning: Liang Shanbo and Zhu Yingtai
- Hanyu Pinyin: Liáng Shānbó yǔ Zhù Yīngtái
- Genre: Romance, period drama
- Written by: Ying Jun; Li Huozhi
- Directed by: Chen Junliang
- Starring: Peter Ho; Dong Jie; Chen Guanlin
- Opening theme: Yuan Fang (远方) performed by Hongbutiao and Erica Li
- Ending theme: Shuang Fei (双飞) performed by Peter Ho
- Composer: He Zhanhao
- Country of origin: China
- Original language: Mandarin
- No. of episodes: 41

Production
- Executive producer: Cao Heng
- Producer: Cao Heng
- Production location: China
- Running time: 45 minutes per episode
- Production company: 湖南时代明星传媒有限公司

Original release
- Network: GZTV
- Release: May 1 – August 5, 2007

Butterfly Lovers is a Chinese television series based on the legend of the Butterfly Lovers, starring Peter Ho and Dong Jie as Liang Shanbo and Zhu Yingtai respectively. The series was first broadcast on GZTV in China in 2007.

== Cast ==
- Peter Ho as Liang Shanbo
- Dong Jie as Zhu Yingtai
- Chen Guanlin as Ma Wencai
- Yue Yueli as Zhu Yingtai's father
- Wu Qianqian as Zhu Yingtai's mother
- Kou Zhenhai as Wang Shiyu
- Che Yongli as Wang Shiyu's wife
- Wan Hongjie as Zhu Yingqi
- Liu Fang as Liang Shanbo's mother
- Jia Zhaoji as Chen Zijun
- Zhan Xiaonan as Xie Daoyun
- Xie Yuanzhen as Yinxin
- Chen Cheng as Sijiu
- Chen Chen as Wang Lan
- Ming Hui as Wang Hui
- Wang Quanyou as Tao Yuanming
- Guo Jun as Governor Ma
- Wang Pin as Wang Zhuoran
- Zhang Shuai as Wang Lantian
- Qu Xin as Xu Jubo
- Jiang Hong as Huang Liangyu
- Lin Jiangguo as Qin Jingsheng
- Ran Weiqun as Xie An
- Ren Zhong as Wang Ningzhi
- Wang Xiaoshen as Su An
- Gao Zifang as Su An's mother

== Music ==
- Shuang Fei (双飞; Fly in a Pair), the ending song, performed by Peter Ho. This song was one of the themes from The Lovers (1994) and was originally sung by Nicky Wu.
- Yuan Fang (远方; Distant Place), the opening song, performed by Hongbutiao (红布条) and Erica Li (李悦君).
- Ling Hua Jing (菱花镜; Water Chestnut Flower Mirror) performed by Erica Li.
