= Modern Beauty =

- Created by: Jiang Jiajun
- Starring: Wallace Huo, Kristy Yeung
- Country of origin: China
- No. of episodes: 26

Production
- Running time: 45 mins (per episode)

Modern Beauty or Modern Lady (simplified Chinese: 现代美女; traditional Chinese: 現代美女; pinyin: Xiàndài Měinǚ) is a 26-episode 2007 Chinese language television series produced by Starlight International Media starring Kristy Yeung, Wallace Huo, Wang Xiyi, Li Xuan and Yu Xiaowei.

== Main cast ==
- Kristy Yeung as Lin Ziqi
- Wallace Huo as Yang Guang
- Yu Xiaowei as Xiao Jie
- Yvonne Yung (Weng Hong) as Wang Hui
- Li Xuan as Zhu Yun
- Wang Xiyi as Xia Yuhan

== Plot Overview ==
The story revolves around the struggles of three modern ladies Kristy Yeung, Wang Xi Yi and Li Xuan as they explore life and romance in the bustling city of Shanghai. Actors Wallace Huo, Yu Xiao Wei and Lu Jie Jun are the "men" in these three ladies' hearts.
