= The Legend of Guan Gong =

Chinese television series

- Genre: Historical drama
- Written by: Cheng Qingsong; Zhang Xianmin
- Directed by: Zheng Kehong
- Starring: Wang Yingquan; Tian Hairong; Li Wenshuai; Huang Xiangyang; Zhang Youling; Zheng Kehong
- Theme music composer: Gan Lin
- Opening theme: Da Yingxiong (大英雄) performed by Han Lei
- Country of origin: China
- Original language: Mandarin
- No. of episodes: 28

Production
- Executive producer: Yu Guanghua
- Producer: Yang Weiguang
- Production location: China
- Running time: 46 minutes per episode
- Production companies: 中共湖北当阳市人民政府 中共山西运城市人民政府 中国电视艺术家协会

Original release
- Network: Guangdong TV

The Legend of Guan Gong
- Traditional Chinese: 武聖關公
- Simplified Chinese: 武圣关公
- Literal meaning: Military Sage Lord Guan
Transcriptions
Standard Mandarin
- Hanyu Pinyin: Wǔ Shèng Guān Gōng

The Legend of Guan Gong is a 2004 Chinese television series based on the story of Guan Yu, a general of the late Han dynasty. The series has been released in North America by Image Entertainment.

== Plot ==
The story begins with Guan Yu's early life, when he is forced to flee his hometown to avoid arrest after killing a local bully. After a long journey and experiencing hardship, Guan meets Liu Bei and Zhang Fei and becomes sworn brothers with them in the Oath of the Peach Garden. Since then, the three of them have dedicated their lives to defending the Han dynasty and bringing peace to the empire.

The series differs from Guan Yu's official biography in Records of Three Kingdoms, folk tales about him and his story in the 14th century novel Romance of the Three Kingdoms by Luo Guanzhong. It focuses on four main events in Guan's life story: Oath of the Peach Garden; crossing five passes and slaying six generals; Guan Yu attends the banquet alone and Guan Yu's defeat and death.

== Cast ==
- Wang Yingquan as Guan Yu
  - Li Wenshuai as young Guan Yu
- Zhang Youling as Zhang Fei
- Huang Xiangyang as Liu Bei
- Li Xinyu as Diaochan
- Tian Hairong as Qingluo
- Sun Li as Taohua
- Heizi as Cao Cao
- Yizhen as Lü Bu
- Jin Bo as Zhao Yun
- Wang Guanghui as Zhuge Liang
- Xie Ning as Xu Chu
- Yang Meng as Xiahou Dun
- He Shengwei as Cao Ren
- Wu Yuhe as Jie'er
- Fan Yan as Lady Mi
- You Liping as Hua Tuo

== See also ==
- List of media adaptations of Romance of the Three Kingdoms
