= Zhuge Liang (TV series) =

- Poster

Chinese name
- Traditional Chinese: 諸葛亮
- Simplified Chinese: 诸葛亮
Transcriptions
Standard Mandarin
- Hanyu Pinyin: Zhūgě Liàng
- Genre: Historical drama
- Based on: Romance of the Three Kingdoms by Luo Guanzhong
- Screenplay by: Zou Yunfeng; Wang Kai; Hu Sanxiang
- Directed by: Sun Guangming
- Starring: Li Fazeng
- Country of origin: China
- Original language: Mandarin
- No. of episodes: 14

Production
- Executive producer: Zhang Jingxuan
- Producer: Zhou Dacheng
- Production location: China
- Cinematography: Xing Hanming
- Editor: Fu Zhengyi
- Running time: 45 minutes per episode
- Production companies: Hubei Television Series Production Centre; Hubei TV

Original release
- Network: Hubei Television
- Release: 1985 – 1985

Zhuge Liang is a Chinese television series based on the life of Zhuge Liang, a chancellor (or prime minister) of the state of Shu Han in the Three Kingdoms period. The plot is based on stories about Zhuge Liang in the 14th-century historical novel Romance of the Three Kingdoms. The series starred Li Fazeng as the title character and was first aired on Hubei TV in mainland China in 1985. The show has been applauded for its historically accurate sets and costumes.

== List of episodes ==
| # | Rough translation of title (in English) | Original title (in Chinese) |
|---|---|---|
| 1 | Visiting the virtuous in Longzhong | 隆中访贤 |
| 2 | The Crouching Dragon comes out of seclusion | 卧龙出山 |
| 3 | Arguing with the Confucian scholars | 舌战群儒 |
| 4 | Instigating Zhou Yu | 智激周瑜 |
| 5 | Battle of wits at Red Cliffs | 赤壁斗智 |
| 6 | Borrowing the eastern wind | 巧借东风 |
| 7 | Rush to Chaisang | 急赴柴桑 |
| 8 | The Crouching Dragon attends a funeral | 卧龙吊孝 |
| 9 | Allocating people based on their talents | 知人善任 |
| 10 | Entering Sichuan | 拜将入川 |
| 11 | Losing Jieting | 误失街亭 |
| 12 | Self request for demotion | 上书自贬 |
| 13 | Six campaigns from Mount Qi | 六出祁山 |
| 14 | Striving to the utmost | 鞠躬尽瘁 |

== Cast ==
- Li Fazeng as Zhuge Liang
- Fu Pingping / Zhao Huizhen as Huang Yueying
- Calvin Li Zonghan as Zhuge Zhan
- Huang Jiade as Liu Bei
- Wu Zhengdou / Ji Hua as Liu Shan
- Zheng Jun as Guan Yu
- Zhang Xinyuan as Zhang Fei
- Yuan Xinmin / Zhang Dawan as Zhao Yun
- Liu Mingkai as Pang Tong
- Li Jianxun as Wang Ping / Cheng Pu
- Su Houchao as Wei Yan
- Li Chengbin as Xu Shu
- Wu Chunguang as Jiang Wan
- Yue Maolin as Fei Yi
- He Yuhai as Jiang Wei
- Fen Yinzhi as Yang Yi
- Hu Kui as Yan Yan / Yan Jun
- Wang Shuhai as Shi Guangyuan
- Bao Jinxiang as Meng Gongwei
- Sun Jianzhang as Cui Zhouping
- Mei Rongqing as Huang Chengyan
- Deng Qiping as Zhuge Jun
- Shen Jianjun as Zhuge Qiao
- Zhou Dacheng as Guan Ping
- Zhu Jie as Guan Xing
- Wang Lihang as Zhang Bao / Cai Mao
- Luo Minzhi as Ma Su / Zhang Wen
- Wang Jizhi as Xiang Lang
- Tian Yiqiu as Li Fu
- Zhang Zhang as Cao Cao
- Shi Decai as Xiahou Dun
- Han Sui as Yue Jin
- Pan Zhengmin as Zhang He
- Zhang Huaizhi as Jiang Gan
- Shao Yongcheng as Zhang Yun
- Wang Zhenrong as Sima Yi
- Wu Zhenghan as Sima Shi
- Ai Wu as Sima Zhao
- Xu Zhengyun as Sun Quan
- Jiang Gengliang as Zhou Yu
- Liu Lihua as Xiaoqiao
- Feng Mingyi / Song Banggui as Lu Su
- Yang Xiuzhang as Huang Gai
- Li Jinlu as Gan Ning
- Qian Wenhua as Zhang Zhao
- Zhang Jichao as Yu Fan
- Dong Shaomin as Bu Zhi
- Zhang Qingchang as Lu Ji
- Lu Youcheng as Cheng Bing
- Zhang Qinghai as Xue Zong
- Tian Yu as Luo Tong
- Wan Wei as Zhou Xun
- Yao Kanghong as Zhang Xiu

== Awards and nominations ==
The series won the following awards in China in 1986:

- First Prize for Outstanding Television Series, Golden Achievements Awards
- Special Award, 4th Golden Eagle Awards
- Second Prize for Outstanding Television Series, 6th Flying Apsaras Awards

== See also ==
- The Legendary Prime Minister – Zhuge Liang
- List of media adaptations of Romance of the Three Kingdoms
