= Tang Ming Huang (TV series) =

1990 Chinese television series

- Poster
- 唐明皇
- Genre: Historical drama
- Based on: Tang Ming Huang by Wu Yinyi
- Screenplay by: Zhang Xian; Ye Nan; Cao Hui; Liu Chenzhong
- Directed by: Chen Jialin
- Starring: Liu Wei; Lin Fangbing
- Theme music composer: Zhang Zhuoya; Wang Zujie
- Composer: Yao Shengchang
- Country of origin: China
- Original language: Mandarin
- No. of episodes: 40

Production
- Executive producer: Zhang Tianmin
- Producers: Jin Yusheng; Qiu Liang; Wu Bike; Weng Daocai
- Production location: China
- Cinematography: Dong Jue; Du Xin
- Editors: Yu Jin; Wang Ru; Li Shu
- Running time: ≈45 minutes per episode
- Production company: China Television Production Centre

Original release
- Network: CCTV-1
- Release: 1990

Tang Ming Huang (Note: Li Longji was given this name during the Qing dynasty as his temple name Xuanzong violated the naming taboo of the Kangxi Emperor, whose personal name is Xuanye.) (唐明皇) is a Chinese historical television series based on the events during the reign of Emperor Xuanzong of the Tang dynasty. The series was directed by Chen Jialin and starred Liu Wei as the eponymous emperor. It was first broadcast on CCTV-1 in 1990 in mainland China.

== Cast ==
- Liu Wei as Li Longji
  - Yin Shen as Li Longji (younger)
- Lin Fangbing as Yang Yuhuan
- Lin Ruping as Gao Lishi
- Li Jianqun as Consort Wu
- Zhu Lin as Wu Zetian
- Yan Minqiu as Princess Taiping
- Tian Chengren as Li Dan
- Li Jingli as Empress Wang
- Zhou Jie as Consort Zhao
- Zhao Ying as Empress Wei
- Sun Qianqian as Princess Anle
- Zhao Ruping as Li Xian
- Ji Yuan as Li Fan
- Chang Ningguo as Li Chengqi
- Huang Xiaolei as Li Mao
  - Wang Shiyuan as Li Mao (younger)
- Dou Lianxi as Li Ying
  - Guo Yu as Li Ying (younger)
- Hao Yan as Princess Xianyi
  - Yang Mi as Princess Xianyi (younger)
- Zong Ping as Yang Hui
- Huang Guangxue as Li Ju
- Yin Li as Li Yao
- Li Xiaoli as Princess Yuzhen
- Lin Daxin as Li Heng
  - Li Bo as Li Heng (younger)
- Chen Zhonghe as Empress Zhang
- Zhang Liping as Consort Wei
- Li Xiujiang as Princess Consort of Xinshou
- Chi Feifei as Princess Rongyi
- Xin Lisha as the Princess Consort of Qi
- Che Yue as Li Chu
- Zheng Rong as Yao Chong
- Chen Xiuying as Yao Chong's wife
- Wang Weiguo as Yao Yi
- Mao Xiaoming as Yao Yi
- Niu Xingli as Lu Huaishen
- Wang Bing as Song Jing
- Han Zaifeng as Chen Xuanli
- Han Tongsheng as Zong Chuke
- Han Tingqi as Wei Wen
- Wang Zhicheng as Wei Xuan
- Lin Zongying as Shangguan Wan'er
- Ye Qinglin as Dou Huaizhen
- Jiang Yang as Xue Chongjian
- Li Yaohua as Jiang Jiao
- Xu Yazhi as Wu Sumei
- Zhao Runfeng as Zhangsun Xin
- Zhang Yuchun as Ge Fushun
- Che Xiaotong as Cui Shi
- Li Hong as Zhang Yue
- Shui Jingqin as Huifan
- Hao Tienan as Xue Ne
- Zhao Jian as Tang Shao
- Tang Zhijiang as Wang Maozhong
- Ma Qun as Ni Ruobing
- Deng Guangxun as Shang Zanduo
- Wang Yanmin as Wu Daozi
- Huang Lijia as Yi Xing
- Wu Baojie as Zhang Xu
- Chu Jianfu as Chao Heng
- Lou Jicheng as Li Linfu
- Yan Bide as An Lushan
- Gao Lancun as Yang Guozhong
- Li Aili as Pei Rou
- Liao Xueqiu as Yang Yuyao
- Ba Lihong as Yang Yuxiu
- Yu Liwen as Yang Xuanjiao
- Lu Jun as Yang Xian
- Liang Xingjia as Yang Qi
- Guo Weihong as Yang Yuling
- Cheng Wenkuan as Yang Shenjin
- Chen Weiguo as Wei Jian
- Shi Weijian as Li Bai
- Chen Ying as Zhang Jiuling
- Wang Pei as He Zhizhang
- Han Li as Li Shizhi
- Wang Ying as Niu Xianke
- Guo Shaoxiong as Ji Wen
- Li Hucheng as Li Mi
- Chen Congming as Li Guinian
- Zhang Xiaojun as Wang Zhongsi
- Hou Yongsheng as Geshu Han
- Li Ming as Li Fuguo
- Shao Wanlin as Wei Jiansu
- Yu De'an as Wang Sili
- Li Liangtao as Shi Siming
- Peng Jun as Guo Ziyi
- Yang Haiquan as An Qingxu
- Liu Tongwei as Yan Zhuang
- Jiang Chongxia as Gao Shang
- Xu Wenguang as An Qingzong
- Chen Weiya as Sun Xiaozhe
- Li Yingqiu as Wang Ling
- Shi Min as Gongsun Ling'er
- Hu Zehong as Talented Lady Zhou
- Xiao Xiaohua as Niu Gui'er
- Jia Zhanhong as Niu Xiu'er
- Su Ke as Xiaoya'er
- Wang Hongtao as an old monk
- Xu Xiulin as an old palace maid
- Zhang Jinghai as Li Yide
- Song Baosen as Purun
- Wu Bike as Inspector Zhang
- Dong Zhizhi as Yuan Qiu'er
- Di Fengrong as Witch Ma
- Zhang Bei as Hua'er
- Lu Chi as Yang Huan
- Wang Guangquan as a wild man from Luzhou
- Li Yi as Lady Hu
- Du Zhigang as Wei Zhi
- Yang Pingyou as Li Xiu
- Liu Yunming as a craftsman
- Li Guojing as He Ying
- Zhao Kai as Li Qi
- Ju Xinhua as Du Qianyun
