= The Legend of Yang Guifei =

- Promotional poster
- Also known as: The Secret History of Concubine Yang
- Traditional Chinese: 楊貴妃秘史
- Simplified Chinese: 杨贵妃秘史
- Literal meaning: Secret history of Yang Guifei
- Hanyu Pinyin: Yáng Guìfēi Mìshǐ
- Genre: Historical fiction, costume drama
- Written by: Zhang Jianwei
- Directed by: You Xiaogang
- Starring: Yin Tao; Anthony Wong; Wang Luoyong; Shi Xiaoqun; He Saifei; Michelle Ye; Li Chengxuan; Elvis Tsui; Tse Kwan-ho; Jin Qiaoqiao; Wan Ni'en
- Opening theme: Wo Haishi Wo (我还是我) performed by Yin Tao
- Ending theme: Shiguang Daoliu (时光倒流) performed by Shi Xiaoqun
- Country of origin: China
- Original language: Mandarin
- No. of episodes: 49

Production
- Production location: China
- Running time: 45 minutes per episode
- Production companies: Beijing Jingdu Century Cultural Development; Beijing Zhongbei Television Art Centre

Original release
- Network: Hunan Satellite TV
- Release: 27 April – 23 May 2010

The Legend of Yang Guifei, also known as The Secret History of Concubine Yang, is a Chinese television series loosely based on the romance between Emperor Xuanzong of the Tang dynasty and his consort Yang Yuhuan. The series was directed by You Xiaogang and starred Yin Tao and Anthony Wong as the couple. It was first broadcast on Hunan Satellite TV from April to May 2010.

== Plot ==
Yang Yuhuan became the wife of Li Mao, a prince. Li Mao was the son of Emperor Xuanzong's favorite, Consort Wu. However, Emperor Xuanzong soon falls in love with her, and he takes her as a consort to deal with the death of Consort Wu. After being harmed several times by Consort Mei, Yang Yuhuan rises to the rank of Guifei. She is compared to Zhao Feiyan by her former lover, Li Bai, and she is reminisced by her former husband, Li Mao. This is the story of a love quadrangle consisting of Yang Yuhuan, Emperor Xuanzong, Li Bai, and Li Mao.

== Cast ==
- Yin Tao as Yang Yuhuan / Yang Yue'er
  - Zhou Xu as young Yang Yue'er
- Anthony Wong as Emperor Xuanzong of Tang
- Wang Luoyong as Li Bai
- Shi Xiaoqun as Xie A'man
- He Saifei as Consort Wu
- Michelle Ye as Yang Yuyao
- Nathan Lee as Gao Xianzhi
- Elvis Tsui as An Lushan
- Tse Kwan-ho as Yang Xuangui
- Jin Qiaoqiao as Princess Yuzhen
- Wan Ni'en as Chu Liuxiang
- Zhang Songwen as Yang Guozhong
- Wu Liping as Gao Lishi
- Xu Jian as Li Mao
- Li Nian as Yuenu
- Chi Huaqiong as Consort Mei
- Yang Mingna as Empress Wei
- Liu Can as Emperor Suzong of Tang
- Yu Qingbin as Shi Chaoyi
- Zhou Jingfeng as Li Yao
- Zhao Xuan as Li Jingzhong
- Lei Mu as Chen Xuanli
- Liu Yan as Zhang Liangdi
- Xu Min as Yang Xuanjiao
- Zhuang Jin as Yang Xuanjiao's wife
- Oyamada Sho as Watanabe Seio
- Yumi Asō as Empress Kōken
