= Da Tang Fu Rong Yuan =

- DVD cover art
- Traditional Chinese: 大唐芙蓉園
- Simplified Chinese: 大唐芙蓉园
- Literal meaning: Tang Paradise
- Hanyu Pinyin: Dà Táng Fú Róng Yuán
- Genre: Historical fiction, costume drama, romance
- Screenplay by: Jiang Qitao
- Story by: Nangong Bo
- Directed by: Zhou Xiaowen
- Presented by: Yan Yiyun; Duan Xiannian
- Starring: Fan Bingbing; Winston Chao
- Opening theme: Chushui Furong (出水芙蓉) performed by Tan Jing
- Ending theme: 1. Hua Zhi Mei (花之魅) performed by Fan Bingbing; 2. Huixiang (回想) performed by Yan Yige
- Country of origin: China
- Original language: Mandarin
- No. of episodes: 30

Production
- Executive producer: Liu Bing
- Producers: Liu Bing; Cui Yisong
- Production location: China
- Running time: 45 minutes per episode

Original release
- Network: CCTV-8

Da Tang Fu Rong Yuan is a Chinese television series based on a novel by Nangong Bo (南宫博) about the romance between Emperor Xuanzong of the Tang dynasty and his consort Yang Yuhuan. The series was directed by Zhou Xiaowen and starred Fan Bingbing and Winston Chao. It was first broadcast on CCTV-8 in mainland China in 2007.

== Plot ==
This story is set during the Tang dynasty, during the late reign of Emperor Xuanzong of Tang. A young girl named Yang Yuhuan fell in love with Peng Bo with the help of her best friend, Xie A'man. Due to unfortunate circumstances, Yang Yuhuan is chosen as the wife of Li Mao, the Prince of Shou. Even after her marriage, she communicated with Peng Bo through Xie A'man. The Prince of Shou is a kind and gentle man, and Yang Yuhuan eventually develops feelings for him.

The Prince of Shou's mother Consort Wu soon succumbs to illness. His father, Emperor Xuanzong is greatly saddened since Consort Wu Huifei was his favorite consort. Emperor Xuanzong's servant, Gao Lishi soon seeks to find a replacement for Consort Wu. At a banquet, Emperor Xuanzong notices the beauty of his daughter-in-law, Yang Yuhuan. He falls in love with her, and sensing this, Gao Lishi soon offers Yang Yuhuan as a consort to Emperor Xuanzong.

Yang Yuhuan is angered, because she actually loves the Prince of Shou. She is forced to leave him, and she watches the Prince of Shou willingly comply with Gao Lishi's orders. To reward the Prince of Shou with his behavior, Emperor Xuanzong awards him a new wife. She also reunites with Peng Bo and Xie A'man, and tells them about her hardships. Xie A'Man becomes her dancer, and they gain the favor of Emperor Xuanzong. She is soon promoted to the title of Guifei.

Tragedy would again struck, due to the corruption of Yang Guozhong, Gao Lishi, and other officials. Yang Guozhong was Yang Guifei's cousin and succeeded Li Linfu as chancellor. Li Linfu was a capable official, and after he was removed, chaos enveloped the government. This leads to the rebellion of An Lushan, and the imperial family loses their dignity. An Lushan's forces soon take over the Imperial Palace, and Emperor Xuanzong is left wandering with Yang Guifei. The situation soon escalates, and Gao Lishi persuades Emperor Xuanzong to leave Yang Guifei. Yang Guifei performs one last dance for Emperor Xuanzong, and hangs herself.

== Cast ==
- Fan Bingbing as Yang Yuhuan
- Winston Chao as Emperor Xuanzong of Tang
- Ma Lun as Gao Lishi
- Wei Wei as Xie A'man
- Ji Ning as Li Mao
- Zhang Zhihong as Li Linfu
- Zhang Tong as Yang Guozhong
- Zhang Jingdong as Li Heng
- Zang Jinsheng as An Lushan
- Liu Lei as Consort Wu
- Yue Yue as Yang Yi
- Li Xiumeng as Peng Bo
- Gao Yalin as Li Fuguo
- Yu Fei as Gao Shang
- Xu Dongsheng as Li Ying
- Zeng Qiusheng as Zhang Jiuling
- Wang Yuzhang as Yang Xuanji
- Li Xiaofeng as Ji Wen
- Zhao Bo as Wu Wenchen
- Zhang Tielin (guest star) as Li Bai
- Xie Jintian as Princess Yuzhen
- Wan Meixi as Princess Xianyi
- Cui Jian as Yang Hui
- Ren Mingsong as Consort Wei
- Liu Hui as Wei Laixin
- Zhao Yong as Wei Jian
- Zhao Yaodong as Li Shizhi
- Zhao Zhongwei as Huangfu Weiming
- Wang Anqing as Lu Buchu
- Guo Wenxue as Wang Zhongsi
- Zhang Yu as Chunshun
