= Lady of the Dynasty =

- Poster
- Traditional Chinese: 王朝的女人·楊貴妃
- Simplified Chinese: 王朝的女人·杨贵妃
- Literal meaning: Lady of the dynasty Yang Guifei
- Hanyu Pinyin: wángcháo de nǚrén Yáng Guìfēi
- Jyutping: Wong4ciu4 dik1 Neoi5jan4 Jeong4 Gwai3fei1
- Directed by: Cheng Shiqing
- Starring: Fan Bingbing; Leon Lai; Wu Chun
- Cinematography: Hou Yong
- Production companies: China Film Group Corporation; ESA Cultural Investment; Tristone Entertainment Inc.
- Release date: July 30, 2015
- Country: China
- Language: Mandarin
- Budget: $32 million
- Box office: US$20.70 million

Lady of the Dynasty is a Chinese epic romance war film directed by Cheng Shiqing (writer of Codename Cougar) and featuring Fan Bingbing, Leon Lai and Wu Chun. The film also had a director group including Zhang Yimou and Tian Zhuangzhuang. The film was released on 30 July 2015.

== Synopsis ==
This is the story of Yang Yuhuan, one of the Four Beauties of China.

After Yang Yuhuan performs a dance for the Li Imperial family, the Emperor notices her beauty. His favorite Consort Wu senses this, and selects Yuhuan as the wife of her son, Li Mao. Yuhuan marries into the imperial family, and gradually falls in love with the gentle, kindhearted Li Mao. She is distinctly unique from the other royals and consorts, due to her attraction to the arts. Yuhuan enjoys the affection of her new husband until there is a rebellion against the Crown Prince. However, the plan is revealed and Consort Wu is behind the plot. Consort Wu commits suicide in front of the Emperor and Yuhuan. After her death, Li Mao realizes that the Emperor is enamored with his wife- Yuhuan. Li Mao poisons the pregnant Yuhuan and sents her to a convent.

Eventually, the Emperor's servant Gao Lishi brings her back to the palace. Yuhuan rejects the Emperor's affections, and in anger, the Emperor announces that Yuhuan is now his new consort. With the advice of Consort Mei, Yuhuan forgives Li Mao and gives up being a nun at the convent. She reluctantly accepts the Emperor's feelings and is given the honorable title of Guifei (First rank consort). The Emperor desperately tries to gain Yuhuan's love, and he sends her gifts, such as hand picked lychees from Chang'an. He planted lychee trees in her yard, and she reciprocates his feelings. That night, the Emperor tells her about his three uncles, who were poisoned in their sleep. One of them was a previous Emperor, and as a child he suffered from nightmares.

Soon, there are rebellions in Chang'an started by An Lushan. Li Mao returns to the Palace and the Emperor gives him a sword as an apology for what he did to Yuhuan. Father and son forgive each other for their respective actions, and Li Mao fights against An Lushan's army. However, Li Mao is killed in battle, and the major city Luoyang has been captured. Consort Mei also committed suicide by diving into a well. The Emperor and Yuhuan were forced to flee from Chang'an but he swore he would let her be safe. The Emperor's army had blamed the rebellions on Yuhuan's cousin Yang Guozhong who's also a corrupt official. The army wants Yuhuan to die or else they will rebel. Even though Yang Guozhong is executed, the army wants the whole Yang family to perish despite the Emperor's refusal. Yuhuan, who overheard this, decided to persuade the army to not rebel. After having intercourse with the Emperor one last time, Yuhuan consumes poison and strangles herself.

== Cast ==
- Fan Bingbing as Yang Guifei
- Leon Lai as Emperor Xuanzong of Tang
- Wu Chun as Li Mao, Prince of Shou
- Joan Chen as Consort Wu
- Wu Gang as Gao Lishi
- Ning Jing as Consort Mei
- Jin Hao as the Fourth Prince
- Chen Baoguo as Imperial Physician
- Wen Zhang as General
- Qin Yi as Nun Xu Gu, Taoist Temple Head
- Tu Honggang as Chen Xuanli
- Wu Yue as Li Ying, Crown Prince
- Christian Frix as Ren Tao

== Production ==
In March 2009, Yang Guifei officially announced, then the production companies included a British company. In April 2011, the film was renamed as Tang Crisis, but when the British production company withdrew its investment, the film turned into a Chinese-Japanese co-production, and confirmed Kwak Jae-yong as the director. In October 2011, at the Busan International Film Festival, it was reported that the film renamed as Yang Guifei' and confirmed that stars Fan Bingbing and Leehom Wang.

In January 2012, the film began to shoot. Japanese actor Shun Oguri played Yang Guifei's former husband in this film. But the concepts between the director and the production company were different, the production company intended to replace the director Kwak Jae-yong, who resigned later. It was reported that the production company said Kwak refused to shoot the film according to its requirements which emphasized a traditional Chinese understanding of the Tang dynasty.

In March 2012, Tian Zhuangzhuang participated in this film, but his position was unknown. while Japanese investors announced the divestment.

In August 2013, after a year-long script modifications, the film planned to restart. However, only Fan Bingbing remains on the casting list. The film's launch event was held in Beijing on Sunday, September 1, 2013. The shoot period lasted four months, ending on 31 December 2013, according to Fan's weibo.

July 22, 2015, at the press conference, Director Cheng Shiqing revealed that Fan Bingbing was so involved in her role that she nearly lost her life once. In return, Bingbing merely admitted that the filming process was hard and did not utter a single complain although the movie took 6 years to finish. Instead, Bingbing said she felt lucky to play the leading role,"I played it 10 years ago in a TV drama. I thought at that time I would agree on any condition if I should have the opportunity to play it again in a movie in the future."

== Promotion ==
During the promotion, it was reported that there was a scene in the film where Yang Guifei (Fan Bingbing) has a tiff with Emperor Tang Xuanzong (Leon Lai) and runs off into the grasslands. The emperor then rides a horse and picks her up with her lying and struggling on the horseback. In the heat of the struggle, the emperor tears off more and more of her dress, revealing her uncensored breast and so on and so forth. Netizens enjoying the scene has termed it love-making on horseback. But the scene was deleted from final cut.

== Reception ==
The film received negative reviews and was a failure at the box office. Derek Elley of Film Business Asia called it a "stunningly mounted but bloodlessly played drama".
