= Jiang Caipin =

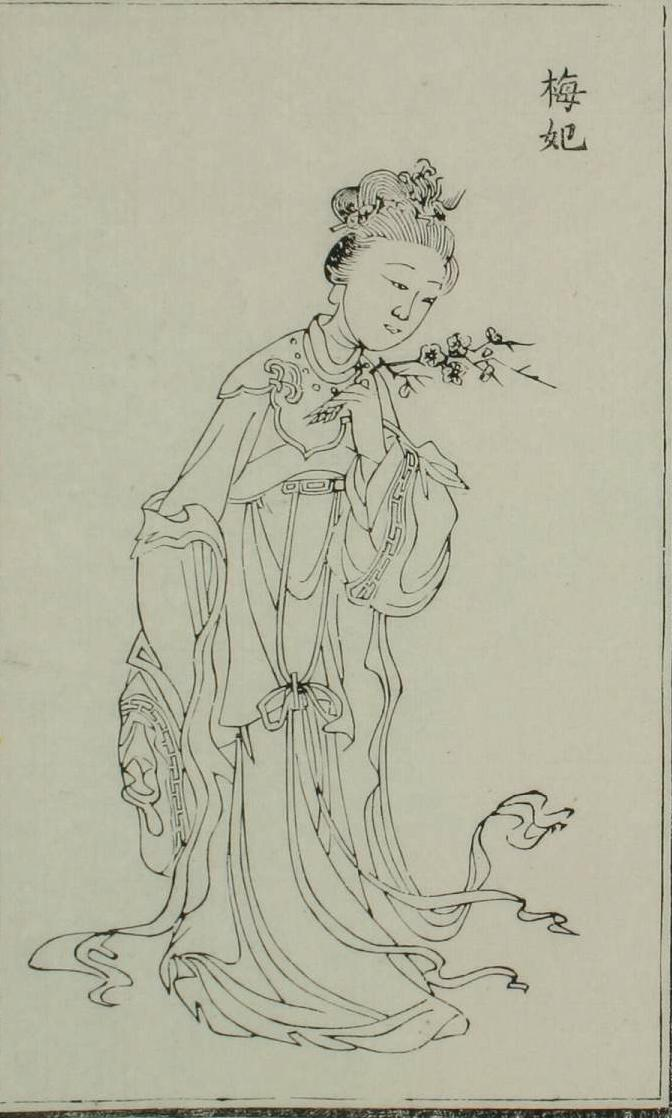
Imperial Consort Mei (in Emperor Xuanzong's harem)

Consort Mei (Chinese: 梅妃; lit. 'Plum Consort'), born Jiang Caipin (Chinese: 江采蘋), is a fictional imperial consort of Emperor Xuanzong of Tang. Her name is not found in any official history book and only in "Biography of Consort Mei" (梅妃傳), preserved in a Yuan dynasty anthology and attributed to the Tang dynasty writer Cao Ye (曹鄴). In 1927, Lu Xun determined that the work was a Song dynasty forgery and should be considered no more than fiction. Later researchers have pointed out that her purported hometown, in the present-day coastal city of Putian, was actually under water during Emperor Xuanzong's time.

== Story ==
She was one of Emperor Xuanzong's favorite concubine, often known as Mei fei (with fei being a standard rank for imperial consorts during her lifetime). As her actual name was Jiang Caipin, she was originally called Consort Jiang. After being told by her that she greatly favored Plum-Blossom flowers (the flower is pronounced as mei in Chinese), Emperor Xuanzong began to fondly address her as Consort Mei.

Consort Mei was initially selected by Gao Lishi, a eunuch official of Emperor Xuanzong, to become one of Emperor Xuanzong's concubines in his harem. As Consort Mei was the most literate and talented concubines, she soon obtained Xuanzong's favors. To express the favors towards Consort Mei, Xuanzong commanded servants to plant Plum-Blossom trees all around her palace to please her interest. Xuanzong even lovingly complimented her beauty as more adorable than Zhao Feiyan, and swore that he would never change his heart for her.

However, in 737, after the death of Consort Wu, another favorite concubine of Xuanzong, Xuanzong was deeply depressed until Gao Lishi convinced him to try looking at Yang Yuhuan - the wife of prince Li Mao, Xuanzong's son with Consort Wu since her beauty was described as the most "irresistible". Being curious, Xuanzong ordered Yang Yuhuan to come and subsequently fell in love with her beauty. Since Yuhuan was still literally his daughter-in-law (as she was Li Mao's wife), emperor Xuanzong then stealthily arranged Yuhuan to become a Taoist nun, after a brief moment, Xuanzong eventually offered Yuhuan honorable title as Yang Guifei (with Guifei being the highest rank for imperial consorts) after bestowing his son Li Mao a new wife. Yuhuan became Xuanzong's most beloved consort as Xuanzong soon forgot about Consort Wu's death. His favors towards Consort Mei also waned.

In 755, An Lushan began to create a rebellion (known as An Lushan Rebellion) in the palace. Emperor Xuanzong decided to bring Yang Guifei and his cortege along to flee from the capital Chang'an to Chengdu. Consort Mei was left behind then murdered during the rebellion.

== In popular culture ==
- Portrayed in The Legend of Lady Yang by Melissa Ng. (2000)
- Portrayed in The Legend of Yang Guifei by Chi Huaqiong.(2010)
