= Li Cong =

Prince of Huichang Commandry 許昌郡王
- Reign: 710–712

Prince of Tan 郯王
- Reign: 712–716

Prince of Qing 慶王
- Reign: 716–752

Minister over the Masses
- Reign: 736
- Died: 18 June 752
- Spouse: Princess Dou (posthumously honored Empress Gongyin 恭應皇后)
Names
- Li Sizhi 李嗣直; Li Tan 李潭; Li Cong 李琮
Posthumous name
- Crown Prince Jingde 靖德太子; Emperor Fengtian 奉天皇帝
- Father: Emperor Xuanzong of Tang
- Mother: Consort Liu

Li Cong (李琮) (died 18 June 752), né Li Sizhi (李嗣直), known as Li Tan (李潭) from 725 to 736, posthumously honored Crown Prince Jingde (靖德太子) and then Emperor Fengtian (奉天皇帝, literally, "the emperor who submitted to Heaven"), was an imperial prince of the Chinese Tang dynasty. He was the oldest son of Emperor Xuanzong but, despite that status, was never made crown prince, bypassed in favor of his younger brothers Li Ying and Li Heng (the later Emperor Suzong). After Li Heng became emperor, he posthumously honored Li Cong as an emperor.

== Background ==
It is not known when Li Sizhi was born, but it is known that he was the oldest son of Li Longji, then the Prince of Linzi under Li Longji's uncle Emperor Zhongzong. His mother Consort Liu, who would eventually receive the imperial consort rank of Huafei (華妃), the third highest rank for imperial consorts, later bore two more sons for Emperor Xuanzong, Li Wan (李琬) the Prince of Rong (né Li Sixuan (李嗣玄)) and Li Sui (李璲) the Prince of Yi (né Li Wei (李濰)). In 710, after Li Longji's father Li Dan became emperor (as Emperor Ruizong), Li Longji was created crown prince, and his sons were created princes. Li Sizhi was created the Prince of Xuchang.

== During Emperor Xuanzong's reign ==
In 712, Emperor Ruizong yielded the throne to Li Longji, who took the throne as Emperor Xuanzong. Li Sizhi's title was upgraded to Prince of Tan. In 715, however, he was bypassed for the crown prince position when his younger brother Li Siqian the Prince of Ying was selected, as Li Siqian's mother Consort Zhao was then Emperor Xuanzong's favorite concubine. In 716, Li Sizhi was made the Protectorate General to Pacify the West and received the title of "Comforter of the Non-Han of the Hedong [(modern Shanxi)], Guannei [(i.e., Guanzhong)], and Longyou [(modern eastern Gansu)] Regions" (安撫河東關內隴右諸蕃大使, Anfu Hedong Guannei Longyou Zhufan Dashi), although there was no evidence that he actually left the capital Chang'an.

In 725, Li Sizhi's name was changed to Li Tan, and his title was changed to Prince of Qing.

In 727, Li Tan became the military governor (jiedushi) of Hexi Circuit (河西, modern central and western Gansu) as well as the commandant at Liang Prefecture (涼州, roughly modern Wuwei, Gansu), but, as was the case with 10 other brothers of his who received similar titles, did not actually take up the command.

In 736, Li Tan's name was changed to Li Cong.

In 737, Li Siqian (the heir), whose name had been changed to Li Ying, was forced to commit suicide after false accusations of treason by Emperor Xuanzong's then-favorite concubine Consort Wu, who wanted her son Li Mao (李瑁) the Prince of Shou to be crown prince. However, Emperor Xuanzong subsequently selected another son, Li Yu the Prince of Zhong, crown prince, bypassing Li Cong again in the process.

Later when Chancellor Li Linfu tried to depose the new Crown Prince Li Yu, he tried to persuade Emperor Xuanzong to create Li Cong as Li Cong was the eldest, but Emperor Xuanzong silently replied, "Cong, my eldest son, in early years when he hunted in the imperial garden, his face was hurt and badly injured." The emperor was implying that someone with a disfigured face was not fit to rule, and this might be the reason why Li Cong was always bypassed and never became crown prince. Though Li Linfu still insisted on deposing Li Yu, Emperor Xuanzong never replaced him, as Li Yu always behaved courteously.

In 742, Li Cong became military governor of Hedong Circuit.

== Posthumous honors ==
Li Cong died in June 752. Emperor Xuanzong, still emperor at that time, posthumously honored him as Crown Prince Jingde, even though he was never crown prince. As he was sonless, he adopted Li Ying's son Li Qiu (李俅), and Li Qiu inherited his title of Prince of Qing.

In 756, Li Yu, whose name was by then changed to Li Heng, became emperor (as Emperor Suzong). Li Cong was further posthumously honored as Emperor Fengtian on 2 February 762, while his wife Princess Dou was posthumously honored as Empress Gongying. They were reburied with honors due to an emperor and empress the next day.
