= Yang Guifei =

Tang dynasty imperial consort (719–756)

Yang Guifei 楊貴妃
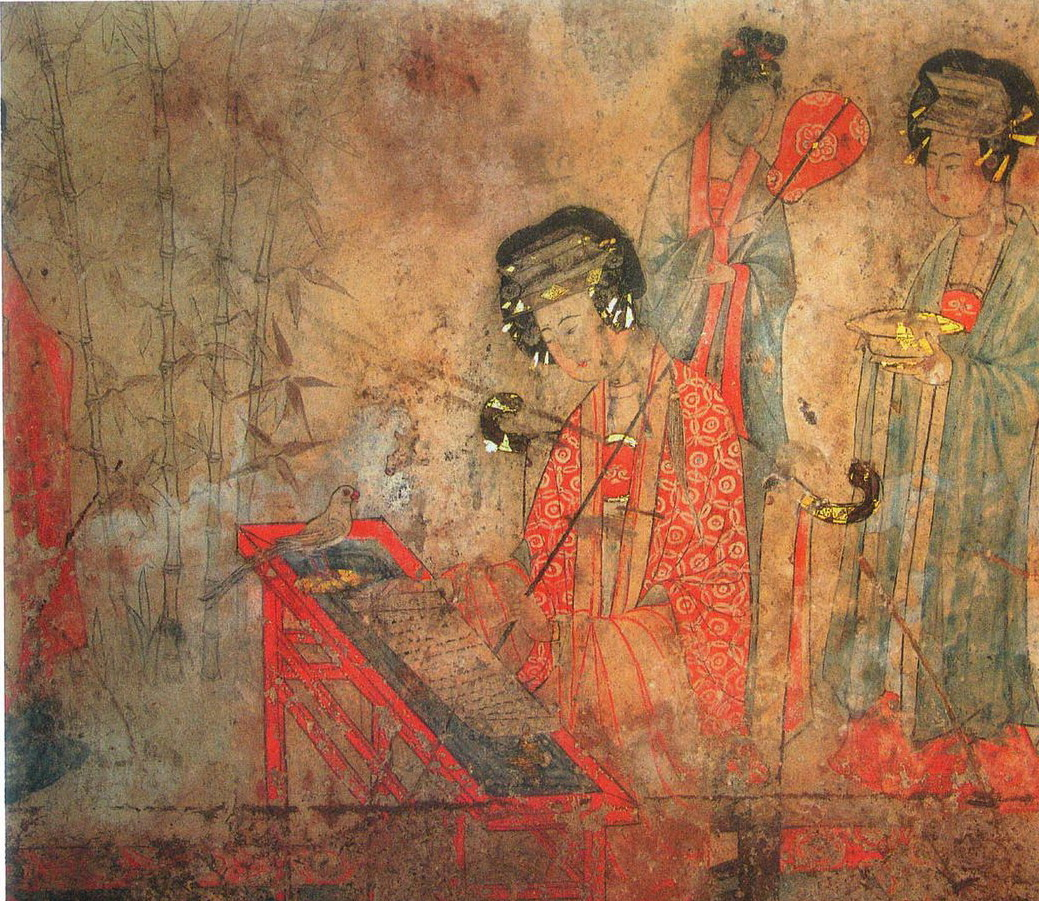
- Yang Guifei teaching a parrot to chant sutras, Liao dynasty c.926-929
- Born: Yang Yuhuan (楊玉環); 719; Yongji, Shanxi, China
- Died: 15 July 756 (aged 37); Mawei Station, Xianyang, Shaanxi, China
- Burial: Mawei Station, Xianyang, Shaanxi (grave later not excavated)
- Spouse: Li Mao; Emperor Xuanzong of Tang
- Father: Yang Xuanyan
- Mother: Lady of Liang

Yang Guifei
- Traditional Chinese: 楊貴妃
- Simplified Chinese: 杨贵妃
- Literal meaning: Imperial Consort Yang
Transcriptions
Standard Mandarin
- Hanyu Pinyin: Yáng Guìfēi
- Wade–Giles: Yang^{2} Kuei^{4}-fei^{1}

Yang Yuhuan (personal name)
- Traditional Chinese: 楊玉環
- Simplified Chinese: 杨玉环
Transcriptions
Standard Mandarin
- Hanyu Pinyin: Yáng Yùhuán
- Wade–Giles: Yang^{2} Yü^{4}-huan^{2}

Yang Yuhuan (Chinese: 楊玉環; 719 – 15 July 756), often known as Yang Guifei or Lady Yang (楊貴妃, with guifei being the highest rank for imperial consorts during her time), and known briefly by the Taoist nun name Taizhen (太真), was the beloved consort of Emperor Xuanzong of Tang during his later years. She is known as one of the Four Beauties of ancient China.

During the An Lushan Rebellion, while Emperor Xuanzong and his cortege were fleeing from Chang’an to Chengdu, imperial guards led by Chen Xuanli mutinied at Mawei Station and demanded Yang’s execution, attributing the decline of the dynasty to her family, particularly her cousin Yang Guozhong. The emperor capitulated and ordered his attendant Gao Lishi to supervise her forced suicide. Their love story is immortalized by Bai Juyi's poem Song of Everlasting Regret.

== Background ==
Yang was born in 719 during the Tang dynasty, early in the reign of Emperor Xuanzong. Her great-great-grandfather Yang Wang (楊汪) was a key official during the reign of Emperor Yang of Sui, and, after the fall of the Sui dynasty, served one of the contenders to succeed Sui, Wang Shichong; Yang Wang was then killed when Wang Shichong was defeated by Tang forces in 621. Yang Wang was from Huayin (華陰; in modern Weinan, Shaanxi), but his clan subsequently relocated to Yongle (永樂; in modern Yuncheng, Shanxi).

Yang's father Yang Xuanyan (楊玄琰) served as a census official at Shu Prefecture (蜀州; in modern Chengdu, Sichuan), and his family went there with him. He appeared to have had no sons, but had four daughters who were known to history—Yang Yuhuan and three older sisters. Yang Xuanyan died when Yang Yuhuan was still young, so the latter was raised by her uncle Yang Xuanjiao (楊玄璬), who was a low-ranking official at Henan Municipality (河南府; modern Luoyang).

In 735 CE, Yang Yuhuan was invited to the wedding of Princess Xianyi, daughter of Emperor Xuanzong, to Yang Hui, a relative of Yang Yuhuan, in Luoyang. There, she met Princess Xianyi’s brother, Li Mao, Prince of Shou, who immediately fell in love with Yuhuan. The prince then told his mother, Consort Wu, who help persuaded Emperor Xuanzong to approve of their union.

== Princess and Taoist nun ==
On 10 February 736, seventeen-year-old Yang married Li Mao, the Prince of Shou and the son of Emperor Xuanzong and Consort Wu. Yang Yuhuan thus carried the title of Princess of Shou. After Consort Wu died in January 738, Emperor Xuanzong was greatly saddened by the death of his then-favorite concubine. Some time after that, however, Princess Yang somehow came into Xuanzong's favor and the Emperor decided to take her as his consort. However, since Princess Yang was already the wife of his son, Emperor Xuanzong secretly arranged for her to become a Taoist nun, with the tonsured name Taizhen, in order to prevent criticism that would affect his plan of making her his concubine. Yang then stayed, for a brief moment, as a Taoist nun in the palace itself, before Emperor Xuanzong made her an imperial consort after bestowing a new wife on his son Li Mao. Yang became the favorite consort of the Emperor.

== Imperial consort ==
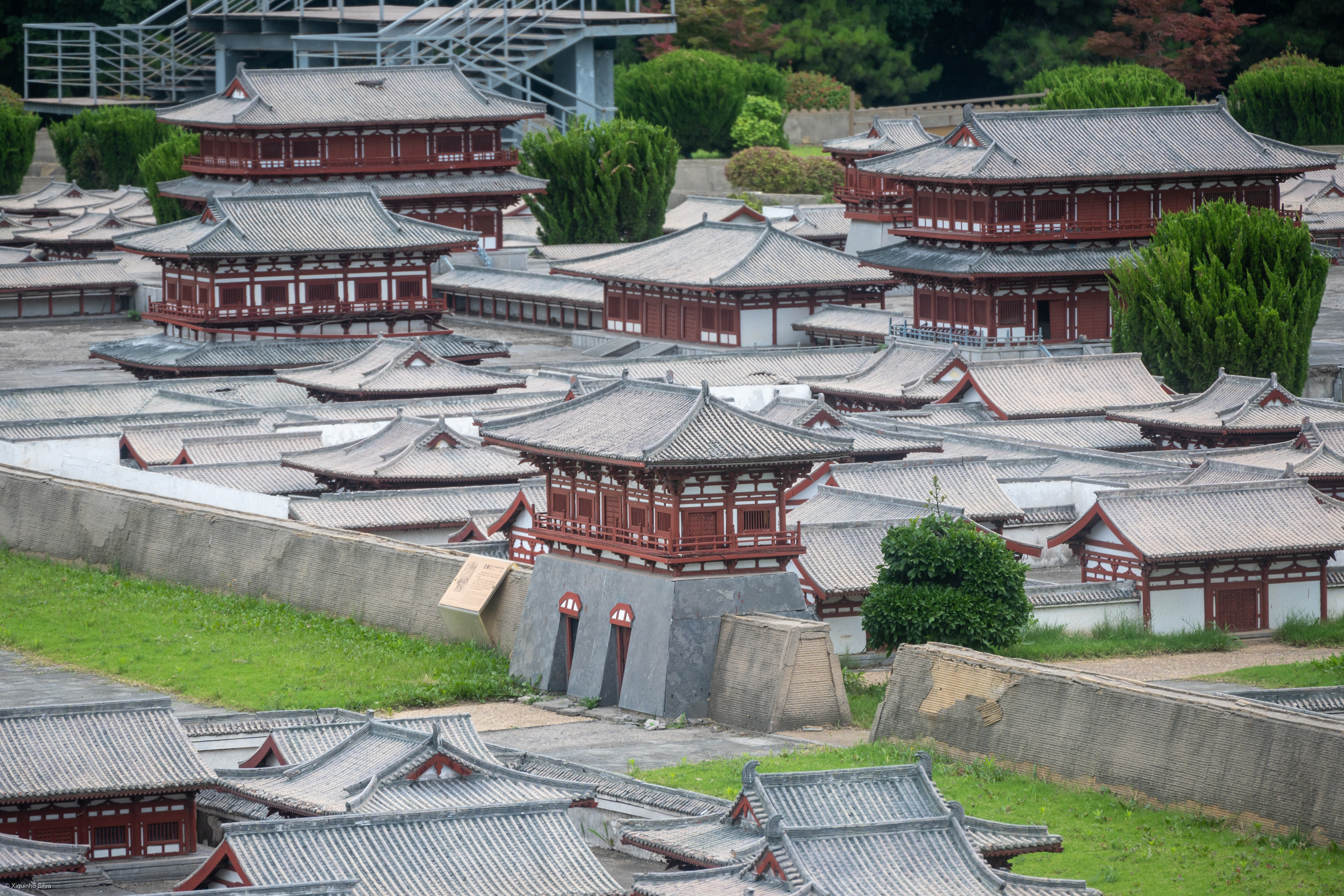
Daming Palace Model National Heritage Park

On 19 September 745, after Emperor Xuanzong gave the third daughter of the general Wei Zhaoxun (韋昭訓) to Li Mao as his new wife and princess on 28 August, he officially made Taizhen an imperial consort—with the newly restored rank of Guifei, which was greater than the previously highest rank of Huifei, carried by Consort Wu. He bestowed posthumous honors on her father Yang Xuanyan and granted her mother the title of Lady of Liang. He also gave high offices to her uncle Yang Xuangui (楊玄珪) and first cousins Yang Xian (楊銛) and Yang Qi (楊錡). Since 745, all within the imperial court and the palace had treated her like the new empress (像皇后; Xiàng huánghòu), and bowed to her as if she was the most powerful woman in the land (天下母; Tiānxià Mǔ), and in the palace, they called her lady (娘子; Niángzǐ), like the honorific used for the empress. Her three older sisters were conferred the ranks of Ladies of Han, Guo, and Qin, and it was said that whenever the noble women were summoned to imperial gatherings, even Emperor Xuanzong's highly honored sister Li Chiying (李持盈), the Princess Yuzhen, did not dare to take a seat more honorable than theirs. Emperor Xuanzong also gave his favorite daughter, Princess Taihua (born of Consort Wu), to Yang Qi in marriage. The five Yang households—those of Yang Xian, Yang Qi, and the Ladies of Han, Guo, and Qin—were said to be exceedingly honored and rich, and all of the officials fought to flatter her.

Around the same time, Yang Guifei introduced her second cousin Yang Zhao (whose name was later changed to Yang Guozhong) to Emperor Xuanzong. Yang Zhao, who flattered the emperor, rose quickly in the ranks.

Yang Guifei became so favored that whenever she rode a horse, the eunuch Gao Lishi would attend her. Seven hundred laborers were conscripted to sew fabrics for her. Officials and generals flattered her by offering her exquisite tributes. In 746, she angered Emperor Xuanzong by being jealous and rude to him, and he had her sent to her cousin Yang Xian's mansion. Later that day, however, his mood was such that he could not eat, and he battered his servants for minor offenses. Gao knew that he missed Yang Guifei, and requested that the treasures in Yang Guifei's palace be sent to her. Emperor Xuanzong agreed, and sent imperial meals to her as well. That night, Gao requested that Emperor Xuanzong welcome Yang Guifei back to the palace, a request that Emperor Xuanzong easily agreed to. Thereafter, she was even more favored, and no other imperial consort drew his favor.

In 747, when the military governor (jiedushi) An Lushan arrived at the capital Chang'an to meet Emperor Xuanzong, Emperor Xuanzong showed him much favor and allowed him into the palace. He had An honor Yang Guifei as his mother and Yang Guifei's cousins and sisters as his brothers and sisters.

In 750, Yang Guifei again offended Emperor Xuanzong with her words, and he sent her back to her clan. The official Ji Wen (吉溫) told Emperor Xuanzong that he had overreacted, and Emperor Xuanzong regretted his actions. He again sent imperial meals to her, and she wept to the eunuchs delivering the meal, stating:

My offense deserves death, and it is fortunate that His Imperial Majesty did not kill me, but instead returned me to my household. I will forever leave the palace. My gold, jade, and treasures were all given to me by His Imperial Majesty, and it would be inappropriate for me to offer them back to him. Only what my parents gave me, I would dare to offer.

She cut off some of her hair and had the hair taken back to Emperor Xuanzong. Emperor Xuanzong had Gao escort her back to the palace, and thereafter had even greater love for her.

In 751, An Lushan again visited Chang'an. On An's birthday on 20 February 751, Emperor Xuanzong and Yang Guifei rewarded him with clothing, treasures, and food. On 23 February, when An was summoned to the palace, Yang Guifei, in order to please Emperor Xuanzong, had an extra-large infant wrapping made, and wrapped the obese An in it, causing much laughter among the ladies in waiting and eunuchs. When Emperor Xuanzong asked what was going on, Yang Guifei's attendants joked that Yang Guifei gave birth three days before and was washing her baby Lushan. Emperor Xuanzong was amused by the comic situation and rewarded both Yang Guifei and An greatly. Thereafter, whenever An visited the capital, he was allowed free admittance to the palace, and there were rumors that he and Yang Guifei had an affair, but Emperor Xuanzong discounted the rumors.

Yang Guifei's cousin, Yang Guozhong, had been serving—remotely—as commander of Jiannan Circuit (劍南道; headquartered in modern Chengdu, Sichuan). In 752, following Nanzhao incursions against Jiannan Circuit, chancellor Li Linfu wanted to send Yang Guozhong to Jiannan to personally supervise defenses against the Nanzhao attacks. Yang Guifei interceded on Yang Guozhong's behalf, and Yang Guozhong did not actually report to Jiannan.

Li Linfu soon died, and Yang Guozhong became chancellor.

== Death ==
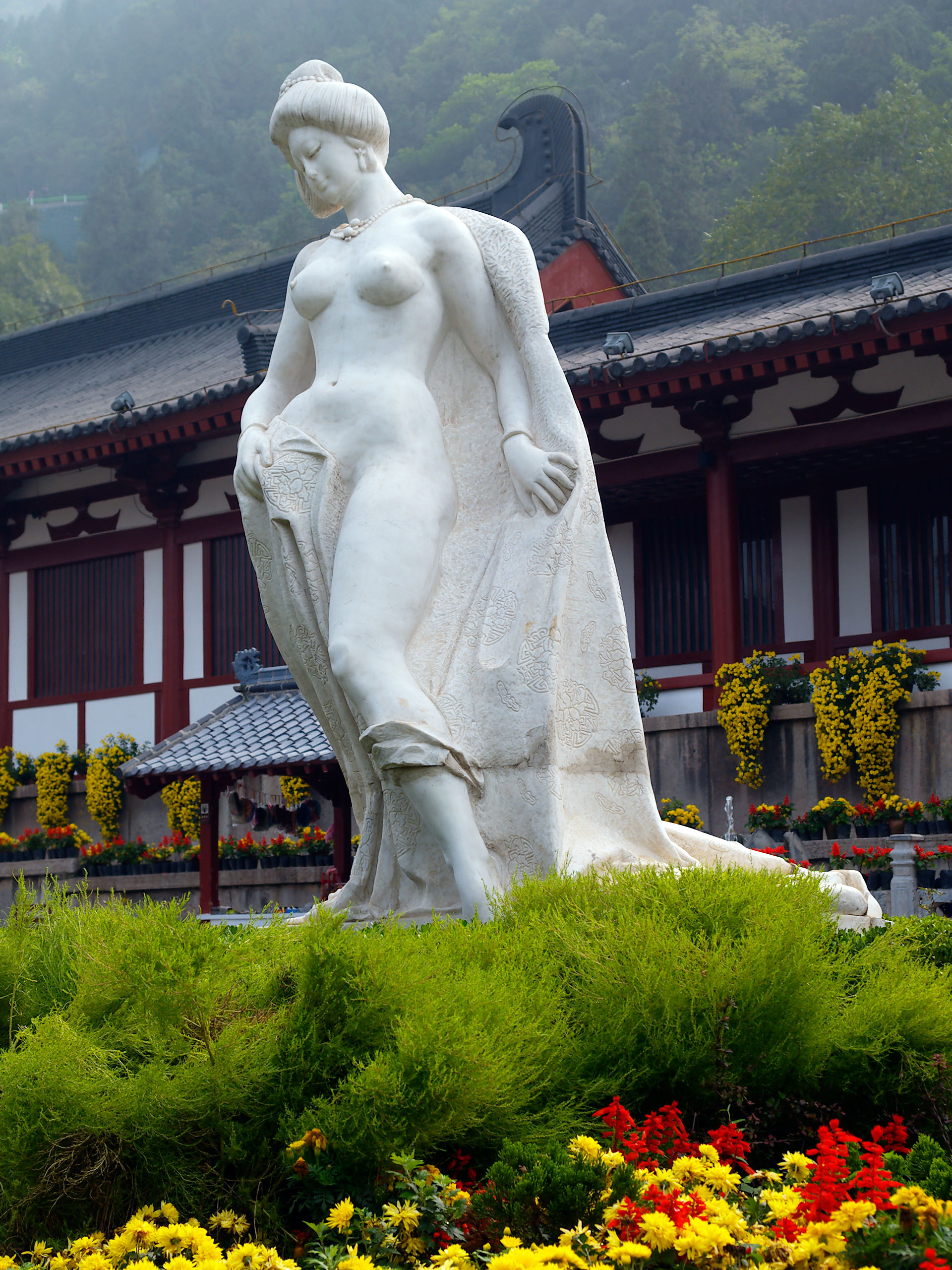
A modern statue of Yang

Yang Guozhong and An Lushan soon were in conflict, and Yang Guozhong repeatedly acted provocatively, such as arresting and executing staff members from An's mansion in Chang'an.

In 755, An finally rebelled and marched his troops toward the capital. In order to try to placate the populace, which believed that Yang Guozhong's conflict with An Lushan had provoked the rebellion, Emperor Xuanzong considered passing the throne to his crown prince, Li Heng. Yang Guozhong, who was not on good terms with the prince, feared this development, and persuaded Yang Guifei and her sisters, the Ladies of Han, Guo, and Qin, to speak against it. Emperor Xuanzong, for the time being, did not abdicate the throne.

In 756, Yang Guozhong forced General Geshu Han to engage An Lushan, at least partly out of fear that the general himself might attempt to usurp the throne. Geshu Han was defeated and Tong Pass, the last major imperial defense, fell to An's forces. With the situation becoming desperate, Yang Guozhong suggested fleeing to Chengdu, the capital of Jiannan Circuit. On 14 July, Emperor Xuanzong, along with Yang Guifei, her family, and his immediate clan members, secretly left Chang'an, heading toward Chengdu. With him were Yang Guozhong, his fellow chancellor Wei Jiansu, the official Wei Fangjin (魏方進), the general Chen Xuanli, and some eunuchs and ladies in waiting close to him.

On 15 July, Emperor Xuanzong's cortege reached Mawei Station (馬嵬驛; Mǎwéi Yì, in modern Xianyang, Shaanxi). The imperial guards were hungry and angry at Yang Guozhong. Tibetan emissaries, who had followed the emperor, were also complaining to Yang Guozhong that they had not been fed. General Chen Xuanli believed that Yang Guozhong's actions had provoked this disaster and reported to Li Heng that he planned to accuse Yang Guozhong.

In this tense situation, soldiers of the imperial guard declared that Yang Guozhong was planning treason in collaboration with the Tibetan emissaries. They killed Yang Guozhong, his son Yang Xuan (楊暄), Yang Guifei's sisters, the ladies of Han and Qin, and Wei Fangjin. (Wei Jiansu was severely injured and nearly killed, but was spared at the last moment.) Yang Guozhong's wife Pei Rou (裴柔) and his son Yang Xi (楊晞), along with Yang Guifei's sister, the Lady of Guo, and her son Pei Hui (裴徽) tried to flee, but were killed. The soldiers then surrounded Emperor Xuanzong's pavilion and refused to leave, even after the Emperor came out to comfort them and ordered them to disperse.

Emperor Xuanzong then sent Gao Lishi to ask General Chen Xuanli for his advice. Chen's reply was to urge the Emperor to put Yang Guifei to death. Initially the Emperor refused, but after Wei E (韋諤, Wei Jiansu's son) and Gao Lishi spoke in agreement with Chen, the Emperor eventually agreed. He had Gao take Yang Guifei to a Buddhist shrine and allow her a forced suicide, considered a more dignified death than execution. When Yang Guifei's body was shown to Chen and the other imperial guard generals, the soldiers dispersed and prepared to continue the journey. Yang Guifei was buried at Mawei, without a coffin, but with masses of fragrance wrapped in purple blankets.

In 757, Prince Li Heng, who had taken the throne as Emperor Suzong, recaptured Chang'an and welcomed ex-Emperor Xuanzong, then Taishang Huang (retired emperor) back to the capital. Emperor Xuanzong went through Mawei on his way back to Chang'an. He wanted to locate Yang Guifei's body and rebury her with honor. The official Li Kui spoke against it, pointing out that the imperial guard might again mutiny if he did so. However, Emperor Xuanzong secretly sent eunuchs to rebury her with a coffin. When they found the body, it had decomposed, but the fragrance bag buried with her was still fresh. The eunuchs returned with the fragrance bag, and upon its presentation to Emperor Xuanzong, he wept bitterly. When he returned to Chang'an, he had a painter create a picture of Yang Guifei in a secondary palace, and often went there to view the portrait.

== Personal characteristics ==
Yang was known for having a larger figure in an era of Chinese history when such body types were preferred. Because of that, Yang is often compared and contrasted with Empress Zhao Feiyan, who is known for being a slender person. This, in turn, led to the four-character idiom huanfei yanshou (traditional Chinese: 環肥燕瘦; simplified Chinese: 环肥燕瘦; pinyin: huánféi yànshòu; trans. "plump Huan, slender Yan"), describing the physical range of the types of beauties between Zhao and Yang.

Modern-day description of Yang's physical size differs. She has been variously described as "rotund", "well rounded", "full-bodied", "portly", and "obese". However, some consider the description of Yang as an obese woman to be either a misinterpretation of ancient Chinese texts, or a misapplication of modern standards on body size.

Lychees were a favorite fruit of Yang and later became a literary and historical symbol of her exceptional favor and perceived extravagance, often cited allegorically in accounts of the Tang dynasty's decline. Because lychees were grown only in southern China, the fruit was transported to the capital Chang'an by imperial couriers on fast horses, with riders relaying the delivery day and night in a system, similar to a Pony Express. Some historians believe the lychees were sourced from Guangdong, while others argue they were transported from Yang's native Sichuan.

Yang is sometimes credited with the invention of the hezi, an ancient Chinese bodice.

Yang was granted use of the Huaqing Pool, which had been the exclusive pool of the Tang emperors. A copy of the outline of her right hand still exists, having been carved on a large stone at the site of the Xi'an Palace.

== Yang Guifei Kannon ==
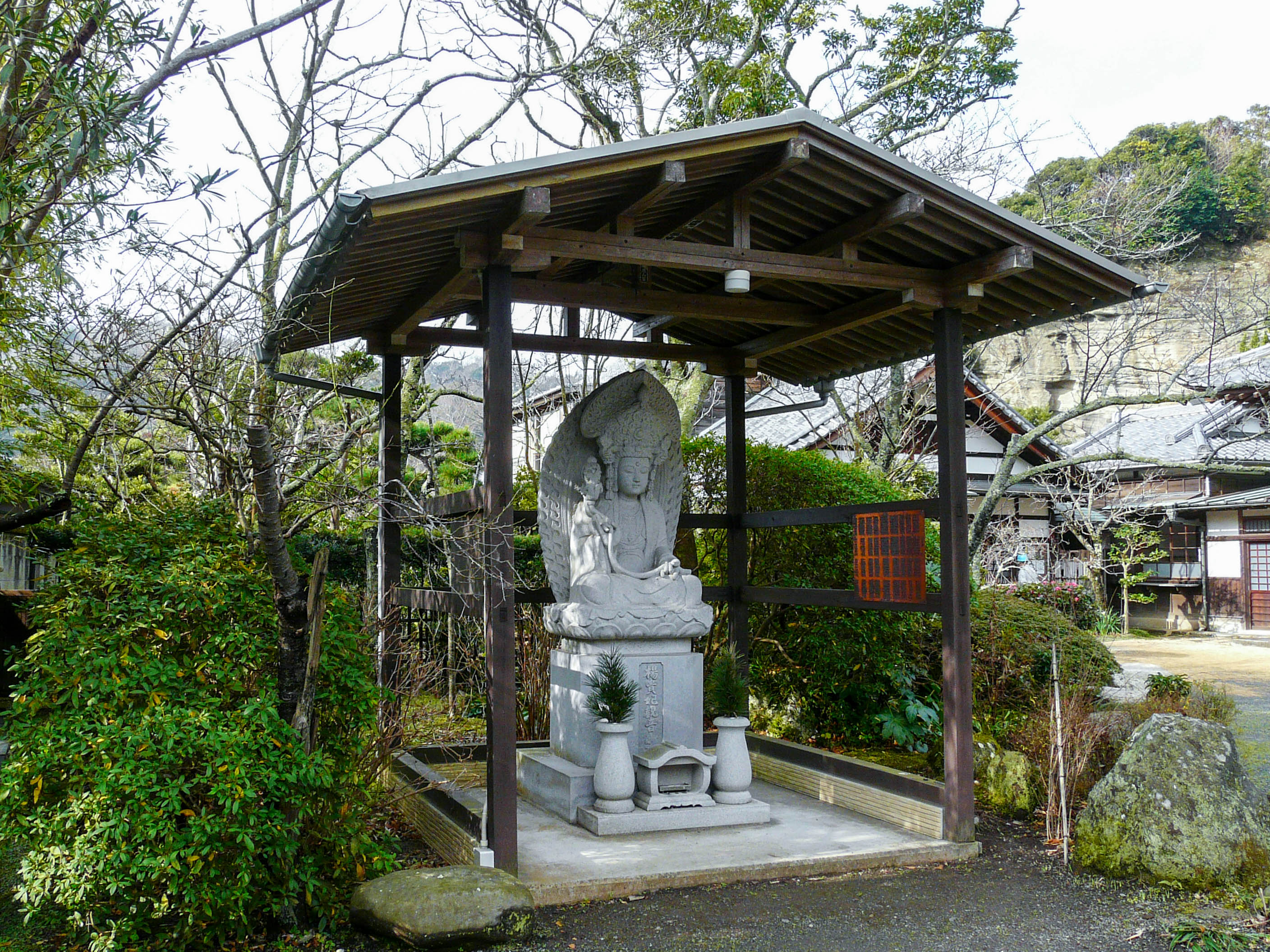
Jokomyo-ji, Yang Guifei Kannon statue at Jokomyoji Temple in Ogigaya, Kamakura, Kanagawa Prefecture

It is said that this seated Kannon statue was modeled after Yang Guifei's appearance, and is enshrined in the Yang Guifei Kannon (楊貴妃観音) Sennyū-ji Hall. It is said that in 1255, Shunsho's disciple Tankai brought it from the Southern Song Dynasty along with the Buddha's relics. It's called Yokihi Kannon in Japan and Empress Yang Avalokitesvara. There's a legend at Sennyū-ji temple that Yang Guifei is a manifestation of Kannon.

For a long time, it was a secret Buddha statue that was only displayed once every 100 years, but it has been open to the public since 1955, 700 years after it was brought there. Its style and materials are clearly different from Japanese Buddhist statues, and it is thought to have been made in the Southern Song Dynasty, as per the temple's legend.

The wooden standing statue of Idaten and the wooden standing statue of Gatsugai Choja, both of which are enshrined in the relic hall, are also from the Southern Song Dynasty, and were designated Important Cultural Properties in 1997, along with the seated Yang Guifei Kannon statue.

== Influence ==
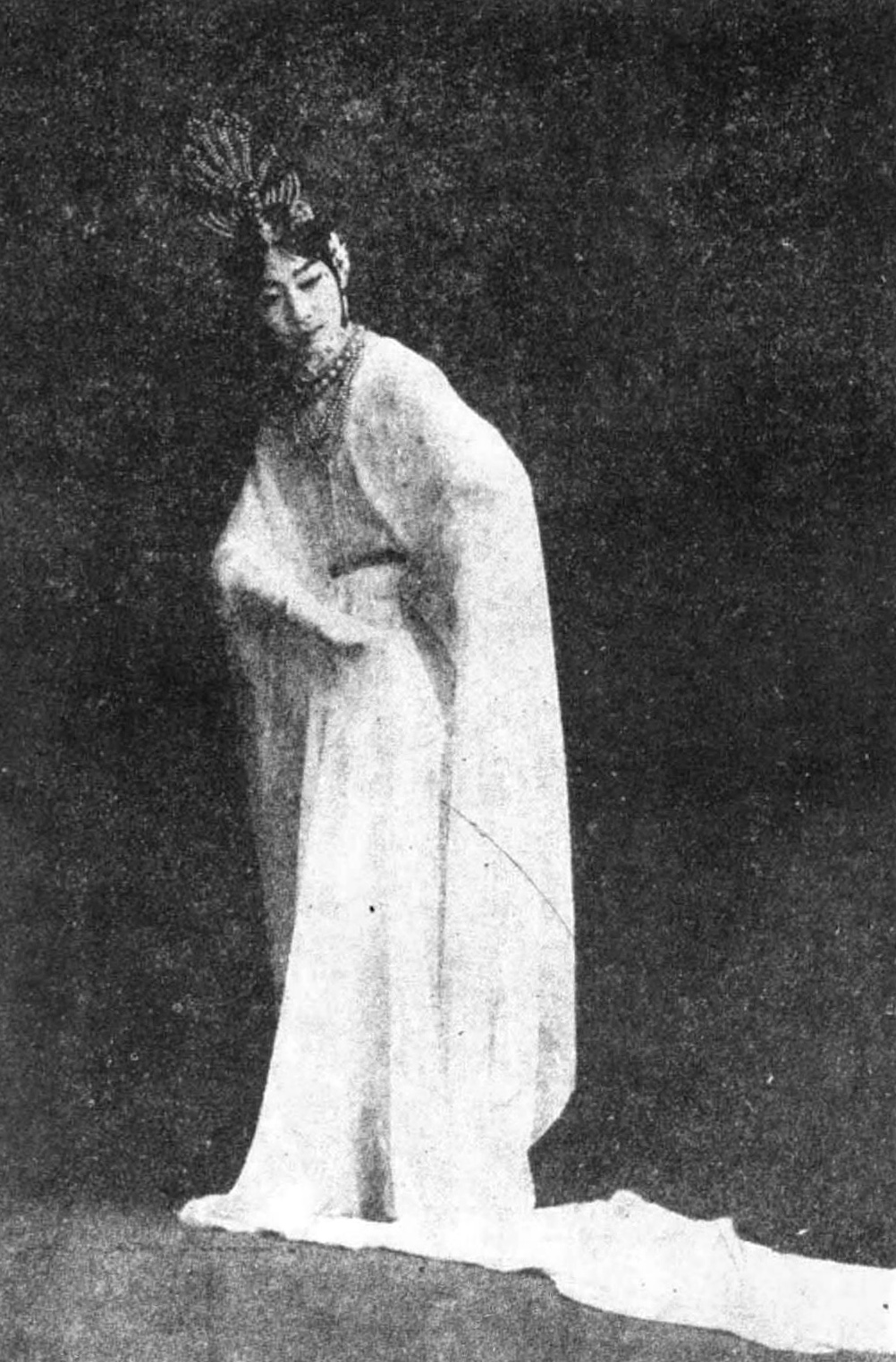
Mei Lanfang as Yang Guifei in a 1928 opera

Yang's story has been often retold. While some literature describes her as the author of much misfortune, other writings sympathize with her as a scapegoat. Her story was immortalized in the poem "Chang Hen Ge" ("Song of Everlasting Sorrow") by Bai Juyi.

The story of Yang and the poem also became highly popular in Japan and served as sources of inspiration for the classical novel The Tale of Genji, which begins with the doomed love between an emperor and a consort, Kiritsubo, who is likened to Yang. Noh plays have been staged based on her story. A Japanese rumour states that Yang had been rescued, escaped to Japan and lived her remaining life there. In Japanese, she is known as Yōkihi. Legend says that her final resting place was at Atsuta Shrine in Nagoya, where she found refuge. A water spring is dedicated to her. The east gate Shunkō-mon (春敲門) of the shrine was also connected to her memory. The gate was a National Treasure and was lost in the Pacific War.

In the novel Dream of the Red Chamber, the two ladies Lin Daiyu and Xue Baochai, besides the main character Jia Baoyu, are similar to Xi Shi and Yang Guifei. Both Lin and Xi Shi are sick and weak, whereas Xue and Yang are plump and healthy. In chapter 30, Xue gets angry because Jia said she is like Yang and she is chubby. The real reason is that Xue does not have a brother like Yang Guozhong.

Other works retelling her story include:

=== Literature ===
- Chang Hen Ge – Song of Everlasting Regret or Song of Everlasting Sorrow (長恨歌) by Bai Juyi
- The Unofficial Biography of Yang Taizhen (楊太真外傳 Yang Taizhen Waizhuan) by Yue Shi (樂史)
- The Biography – Song of the Everlasting Sorrow (長恨歌傳 Changhen Kezhuan)
- The Loveliest Lady of China (short story by L. Adams Beck)
- Under Heaven (Fictionalized as Wen Jian) by Guy Gavriel Kay
- Yang Yuhuan's death is featured in the wuxia novel Datang Youxia Zhuan by Liang Yusheng.

=== Operas ===
- The Drunken Concubine (貴妃醉酒 Guifei Zuijiu)
- The Unofficial Biography of Taizhen (太真外傳 Taizhen Waizhuan)
- The Slope of Mawei (馬嵬坡 Mawei Po) by Chen Hong (陳鴻)
- The Great Concubine of Tang (大唐貴妃 Da Tang Guifei), a contemporary Beijing opera with historical motif.

=== Stage plays ===
- The Hall of Longevity (長生殿 Changshen Dian) by Hong Sheng (洪昇) of the Qing dynasty
- The Mirror to Grind Dust (磨塵鑒 Mocheng Jian) by an anonymous playwright of the Ming dynasty
- The Records of Shocking Grandeur (驚鴻記 Jinghong Ji) by Wu Shimei (吳世美) of the Ming dynasty
- The Records of Colourful Hair (彩毫記 Caihao Ji) by Tu Longlong (屠隆隆) of the Ming dynasty
- Tang Minghuang on an Autumn Night with Wutong Tree and Rain (唐明皇秋夜梧桐雨 Tang Minghuang Qiuye Wutong Yu) by Bai Pu (白樸) of the Yuan dynasty
- Cathay: Three Tales of China by Ping Chong

=== Film ===
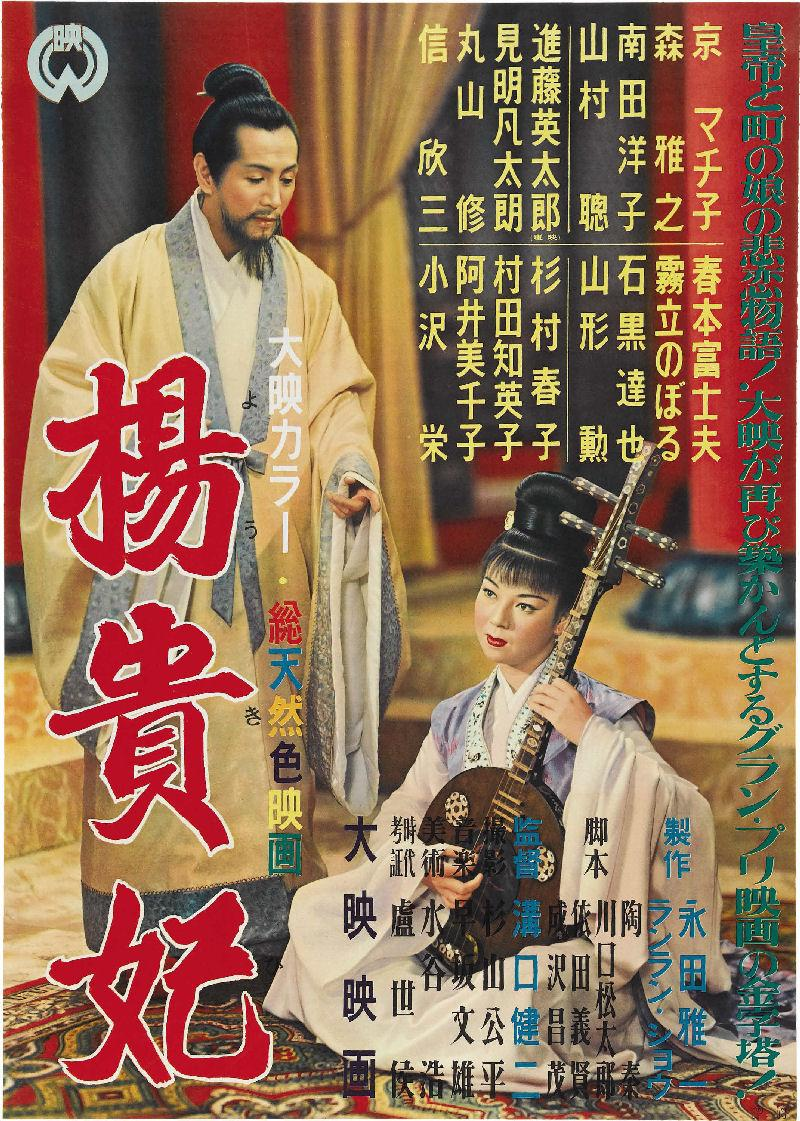
Poster for the 1955 Japanese film Princess Yang Kwei-Fei

- Princess Yang Kwei-Fei (楊貴妃 Yōkihi), 1955 Japanese film starring Machiko Kyō, directed by Kenji Mizoguchi.
- The Magnificent Concubine (Yang Kwei Fei), 1962 Hong Kong film directed by Li Han-hsiang, starring Li Li-hua.
- Yang Guifei (楊貴妃), 1992 Chinese film directed by Chen Jialin.
- Offspring of Concubine Yang (杨贵妃后传), 1996 Chinese film directed by Xiao Feng, with Hou Junjie in the title role.
- Lady of the Dynasty, 2015 Chinese film starring Fan Bingbing.
- Legend of the Demon Cat, 2017 Chinese film directed by Chen Kaige, with Sandrine Pinna as Yang Guifei in a supporting role.
- The Lychee Road, 2025 Chinese film directed by and starring Da Peng, with Yang Guifei's love of lychees as the film's context. Based on Ma Boyang's novel The Lychee(s) of Chang'an

=== Television ===
- Lady Yang (楊貴妃), a 1976 Hong Kong series produced by TVB, starring Lina Yan as Yang Yuhuan.
- Yang Gui Fei (楊貴妃), a 1985 Taiwanese series aired on CTS, starring Petrina Fung (馮寶寶)
- Tang Ming Huang (唐明皇), a 1990 Chinese series starring Liu Wei and Lin Fangbing as Emperor Xuanzong and Yang Yuhuan respectively.
- The Legend of Lady Yang (楊貴妃), a 2000 Hong Kong series produced by TVB, starring Anne Heung and Kwong Wa as Yang Yuhuan and Emperor Xuanzong respectively.
- Whatever is Takes a 2001 TVB series has Annie Man and Benny Chan (actor) portray Yang Yuhan and Emperor Xuanzong in the final episode.
- Da Tang Fu Rong Yuan (大唐芙蓉园), a 2007 Chinese series starring Fan Bingbing and Winston Chao as Yang Yuhuan and Emperor Xuanzong respectively.
- The Legend of Yang Guifei, a 2010 Chinese series starring Yin Tao and Anthony Wong as Yang Yuhuan and Emperor Xuanzong respectively.
- The Longest Day in Chang'an, a 2019 Chinese series with Xu Lu as Yang Yuhuan

=== Video games ===
- Yang Guifei appears in the mobile game Fate/Grand Order as a foreigner-class servant - her beauty and the unrest it causes are attributed to her serving an Outer God.

== Gallery ==
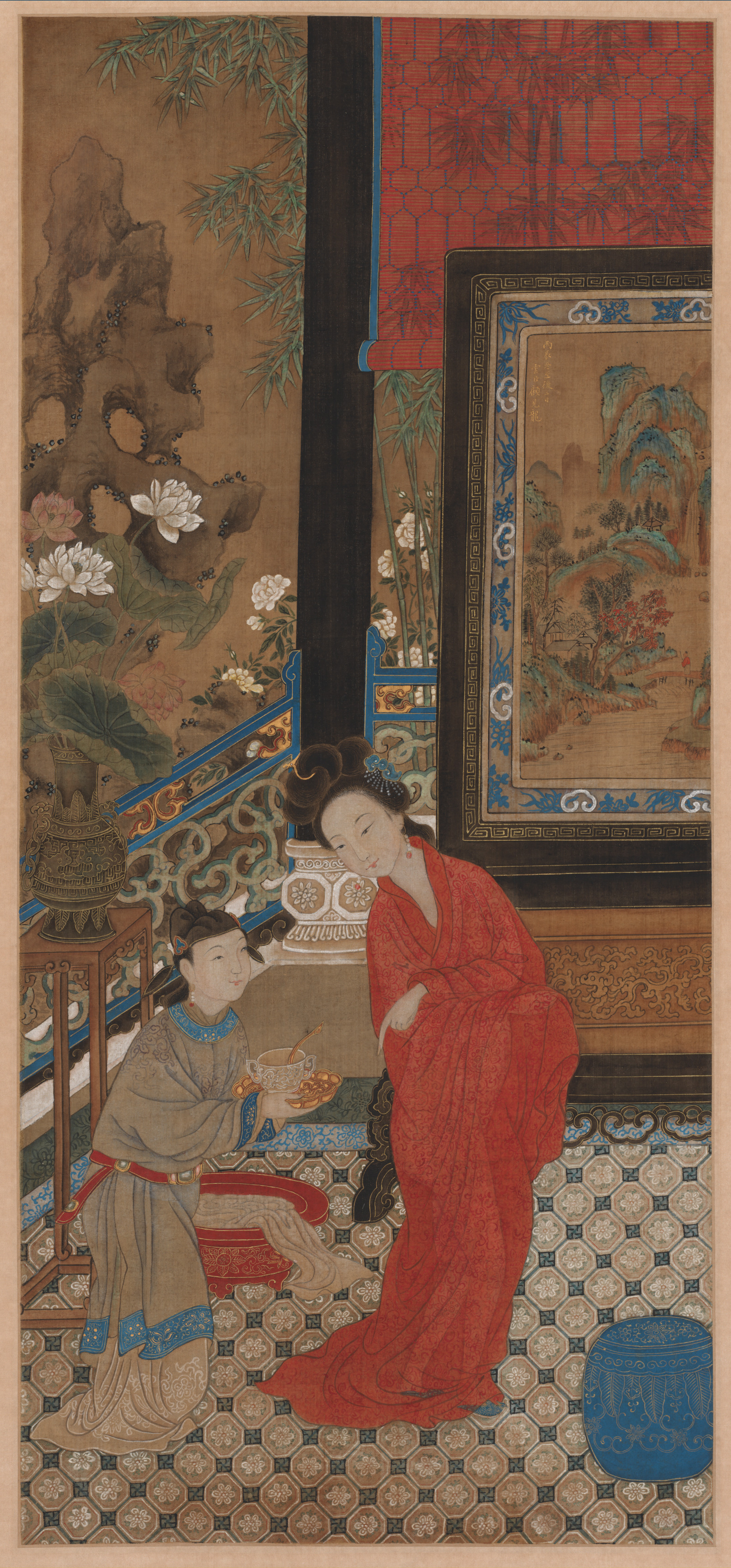
Yang Guifei Leaving the Bath - Gu Jianlong (Ming Dynasty, 1606–after 1689)

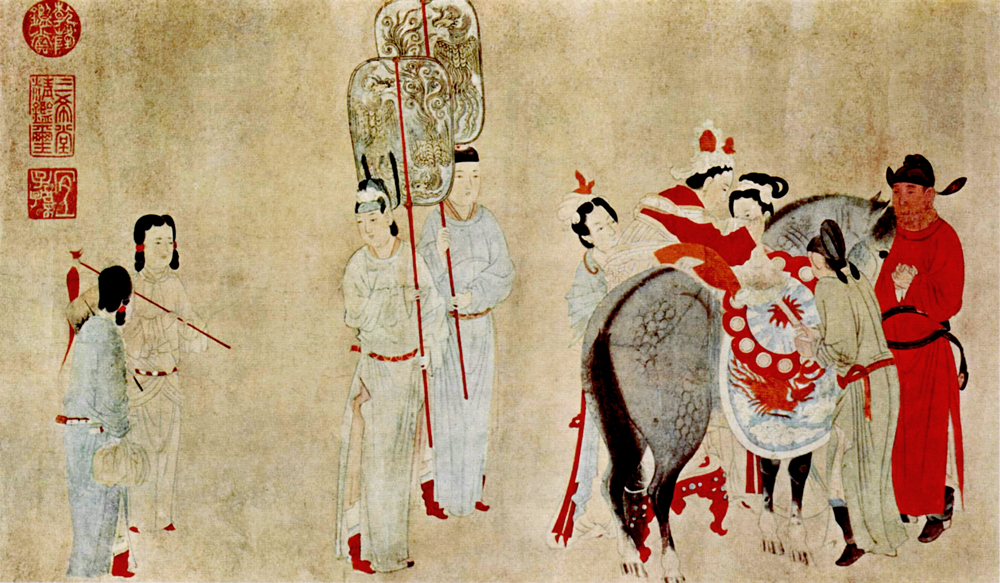
Detail showing Yang Guifei mounting a horse, from 1250 to 1300.

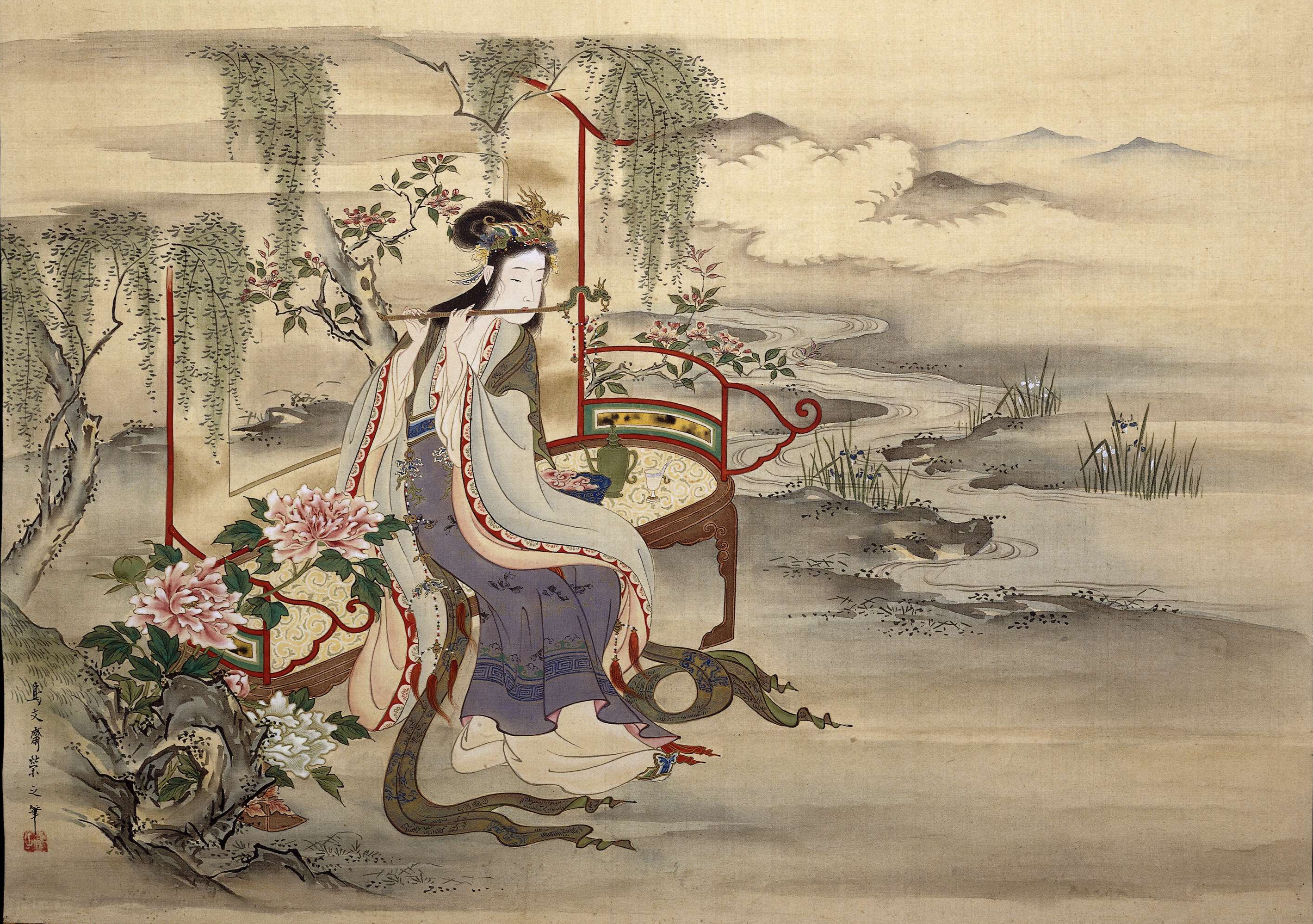
Painting of Hosoda Eishi titled "The Chinese beauty Yang Guifei". Edo period, about AD 1800–20.

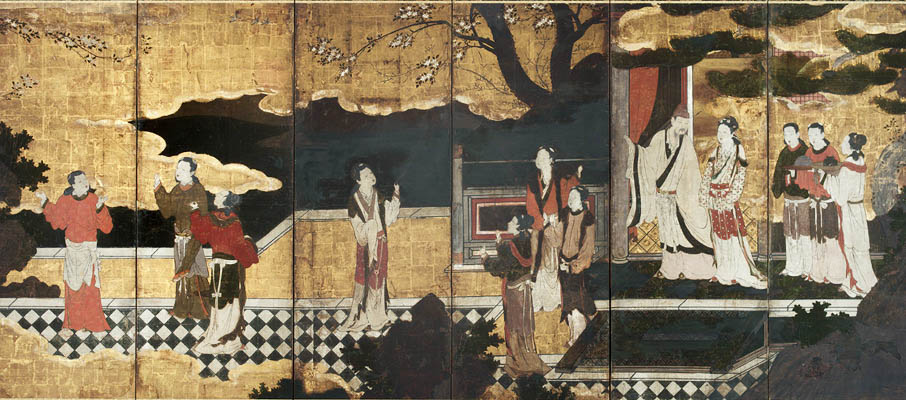
The Chinese emperor Minghuang and his concubine Yang Guifei, with attendants on a terrace. By Kanō Eitoku (1543–1590).

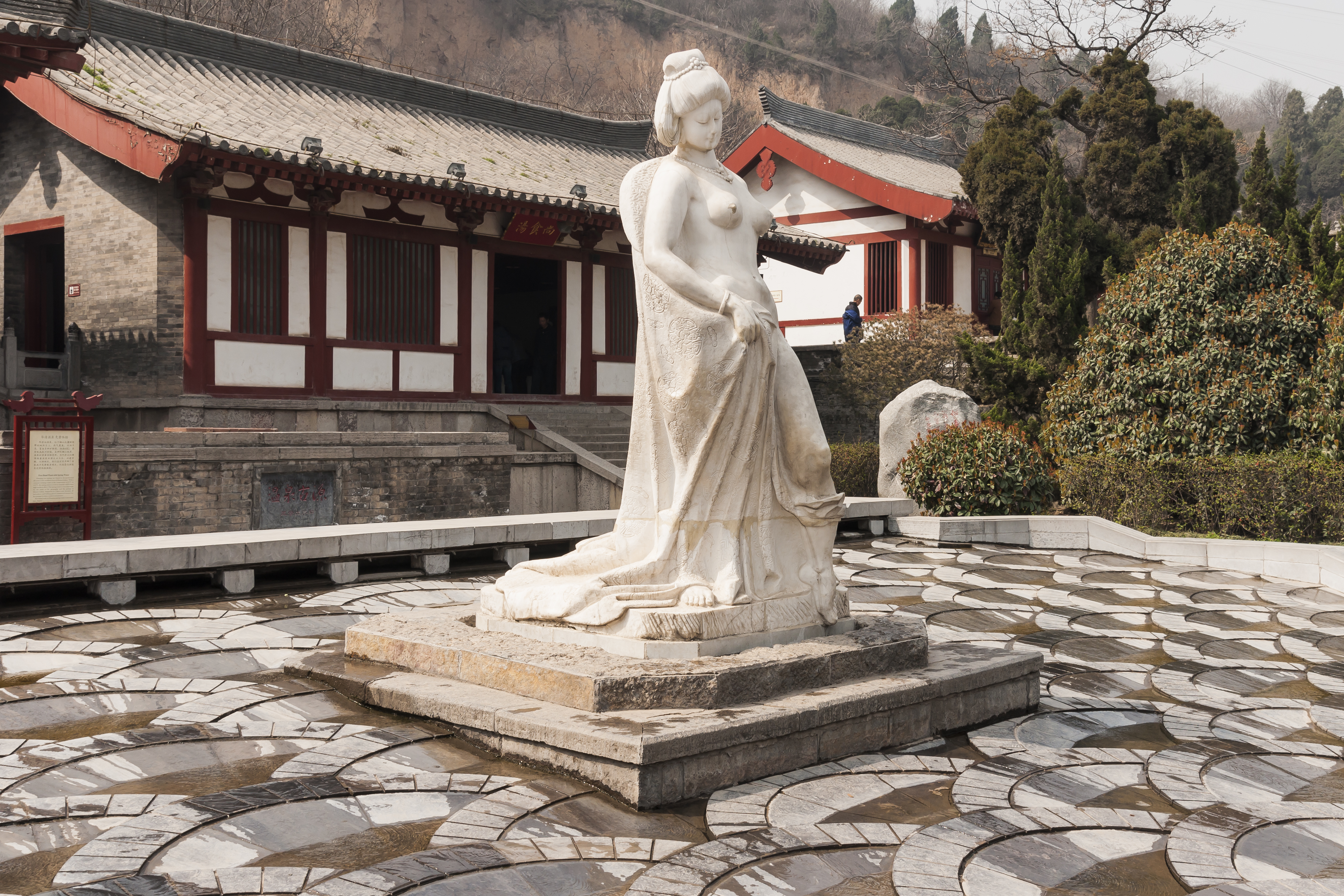
Statue of Yang Guifei at Huaqing Pool.

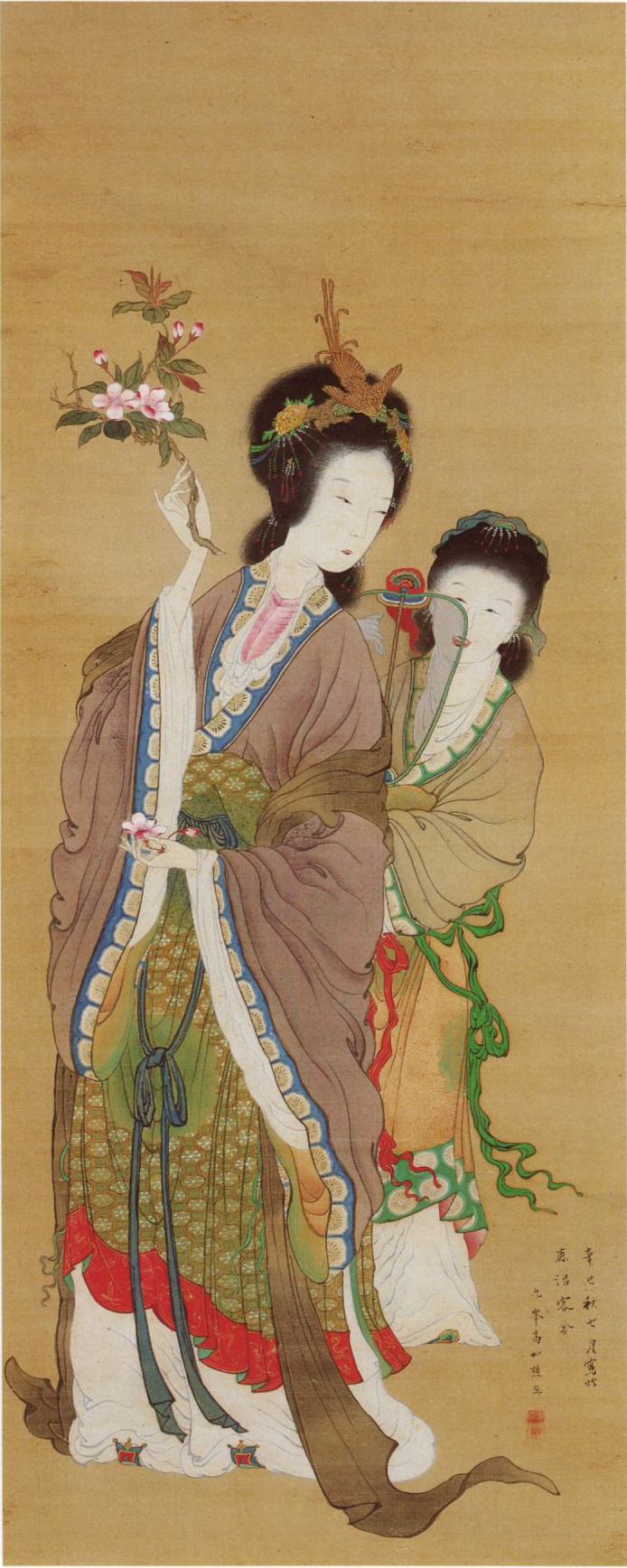
Yang Guifei. By Takaku Aigai, 1821.

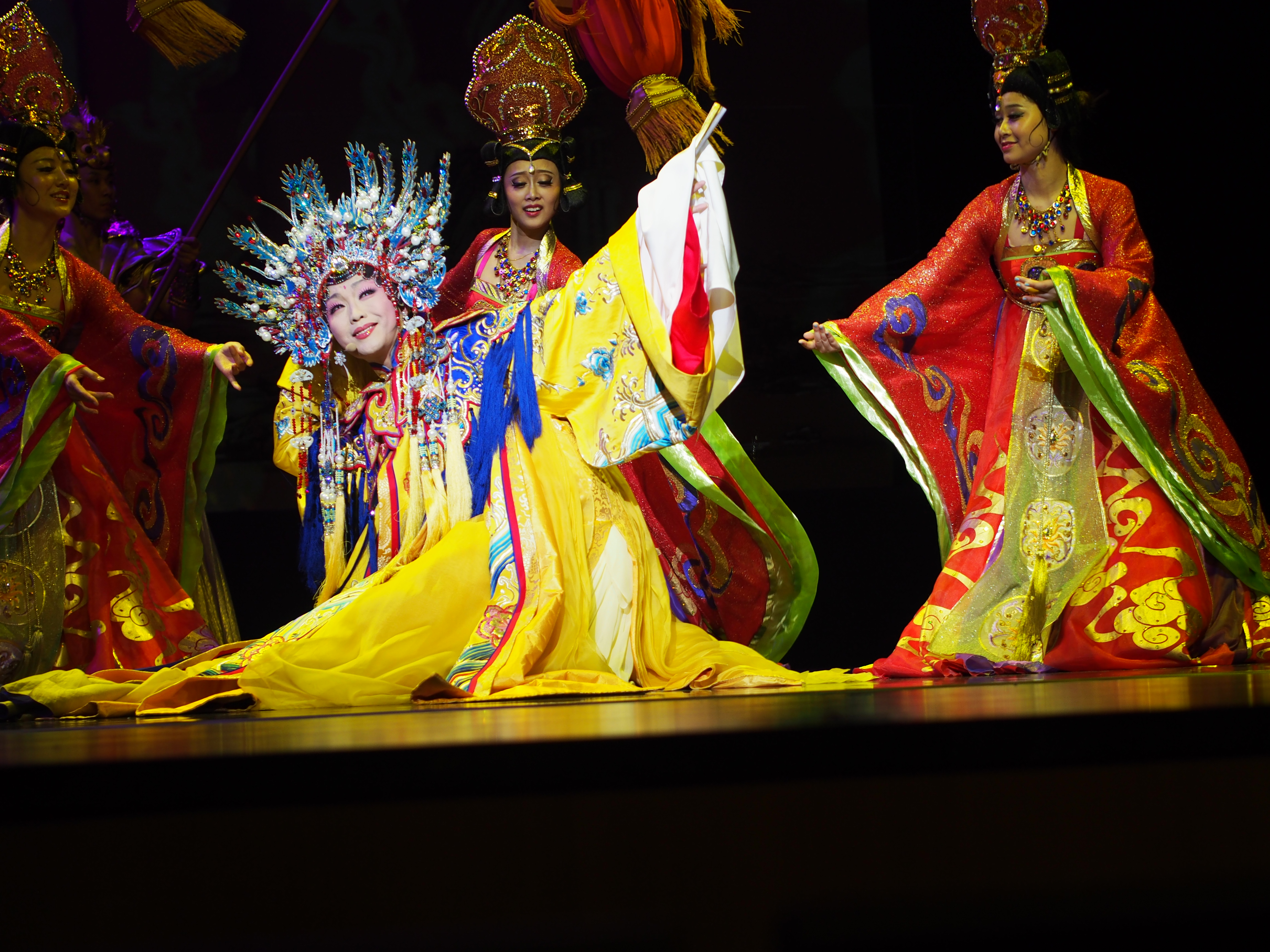
Yang Guifei had a few drinks while waiting for the emperor, from the opera.

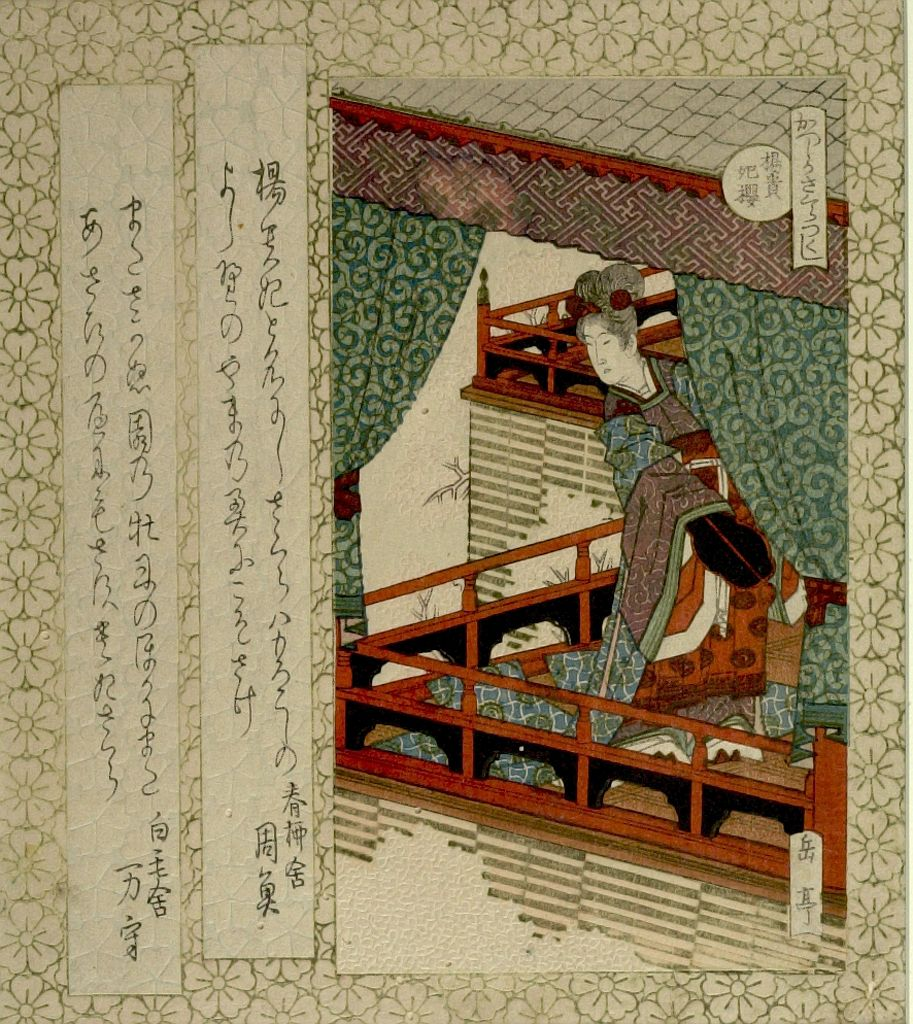
Yang Guifei (Yôkihi) Viewing Cherry Blossoms from Verandah. Edo period, circa 1823.

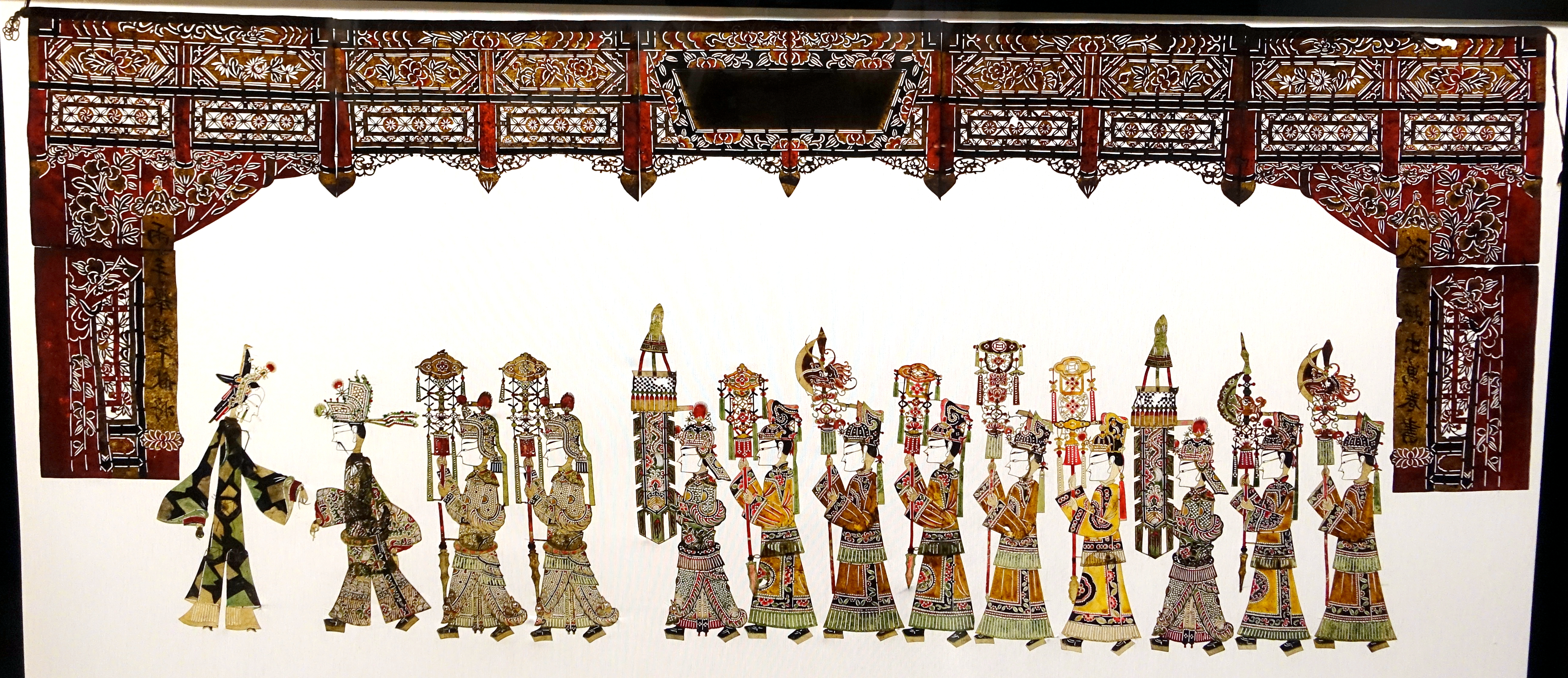
Minghuang and Yang Guifei, from Shaanxi

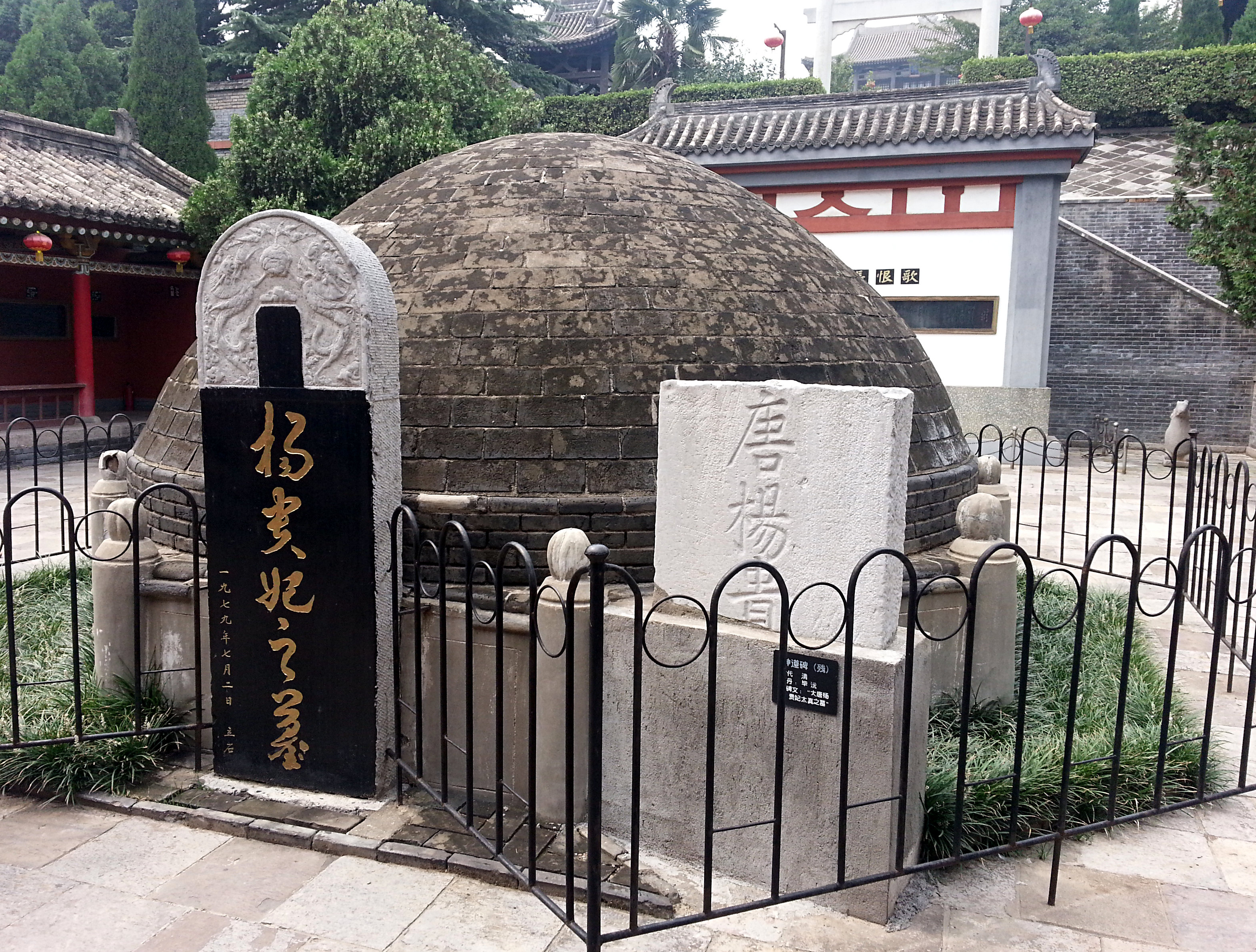
Tomb of Yang Guifei

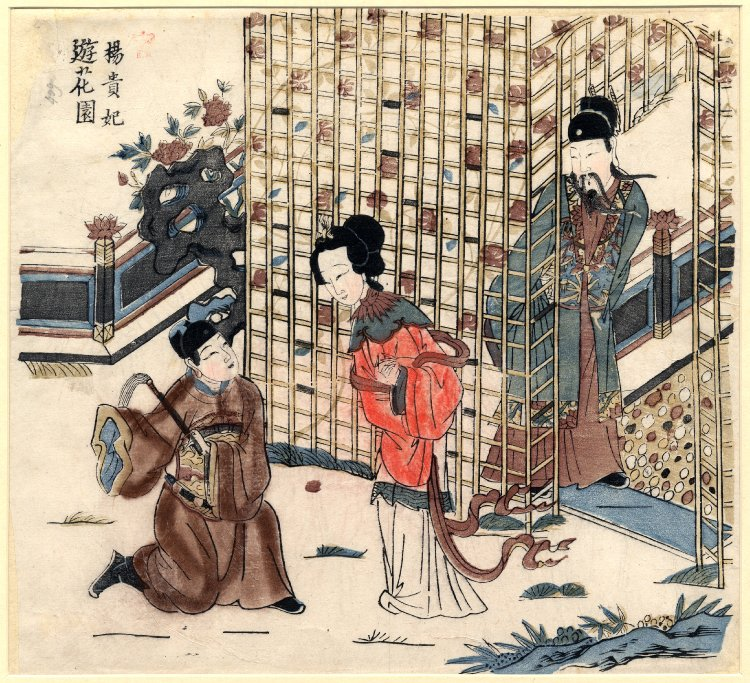
Yang Guifei in a Flower Garden, woodblock print with colors

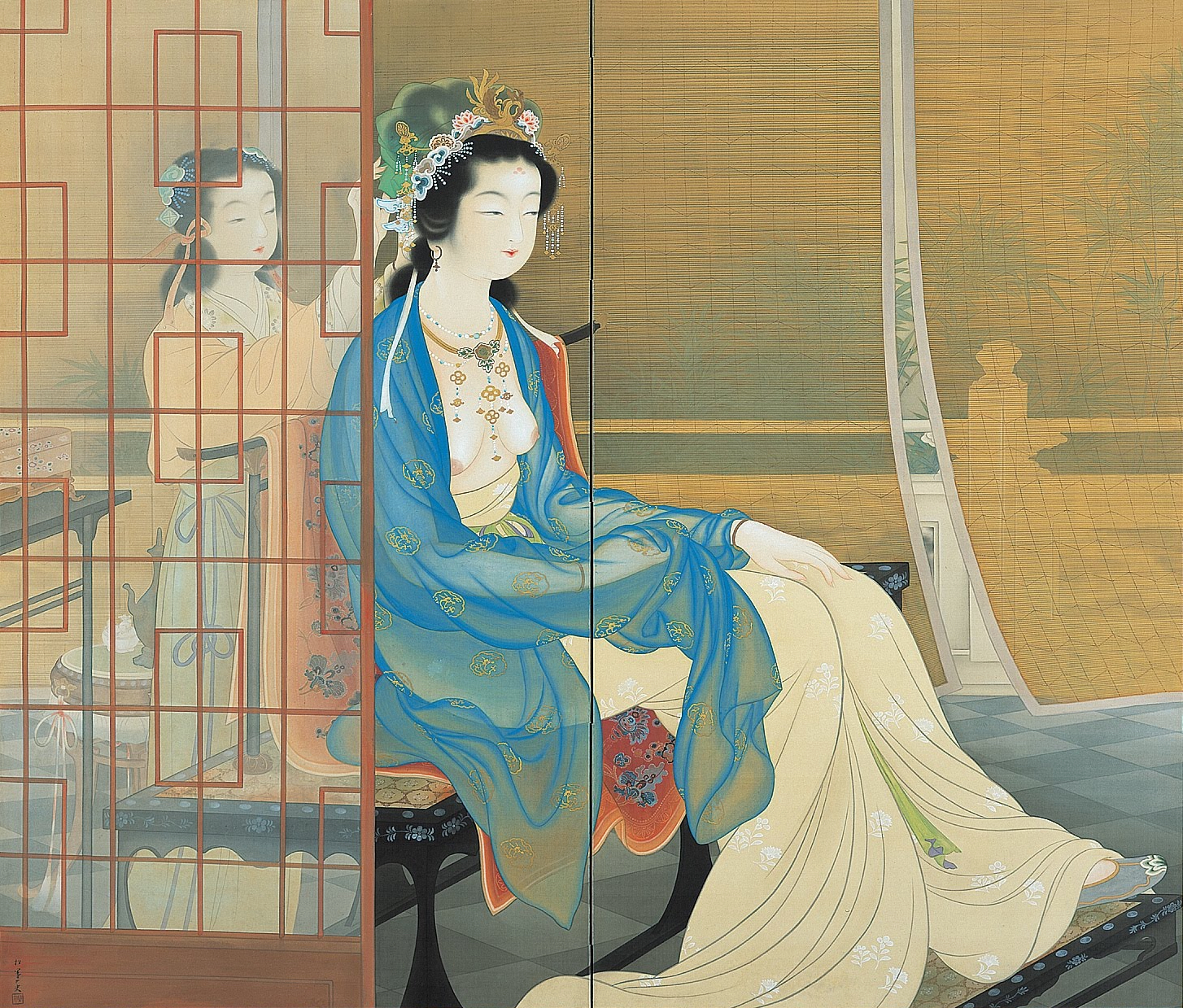
Yang Guifei, by Uemura Shoen, Shohaku Art Museum, Nara, Nara, Japan

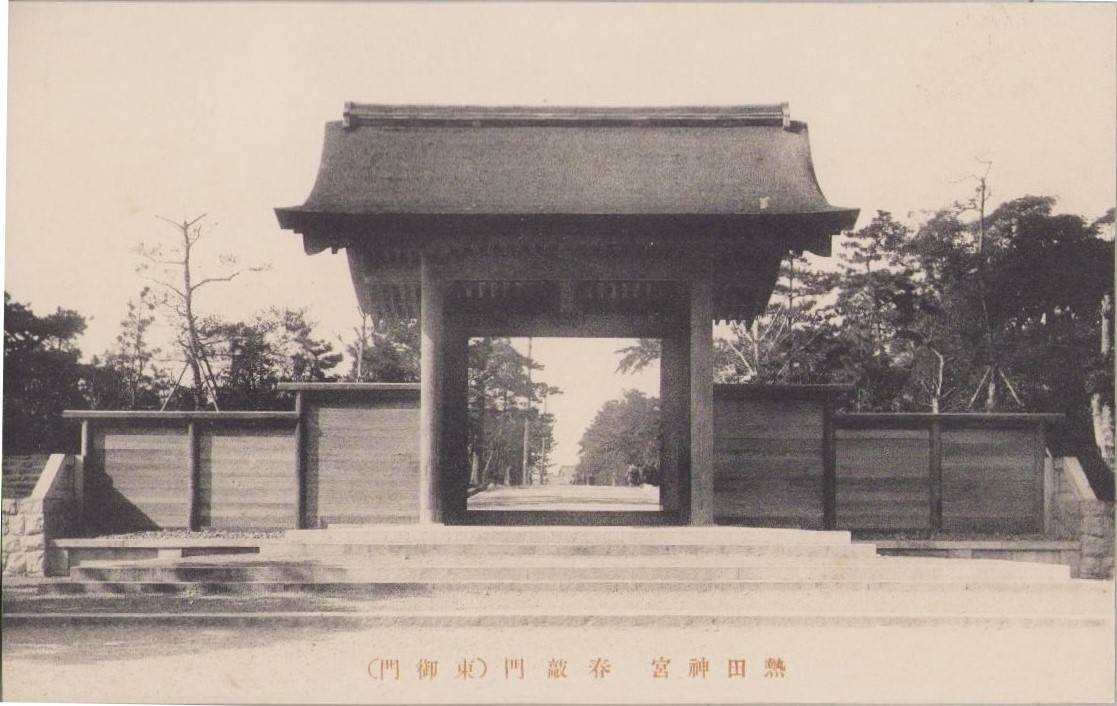
Postcard of the east gate Shunkō-mon (春敲門) of Atsuta Shrine, dedicated to Yang Guifei. The gate was a National Treasure and was lost in the Pacific War.

== See also ==
- Huaqing Pool
- Li Bai

== Other sources ==
- Old Book of Tang, vol. 51.
- New Book of Tang, vol. 76.
- Zizhi Tongjian, vols. 215, 216, 217, 218.
