= Empress Wang (Xuanzong) =

Empress of Tang China from 712 to 724

Empress Wang (王皇后, name unknown) (died c.November 724) was an empress of the Chinese Tang dynasty. Her husband was Emperor Xuanzong. She was initially made empress after he became emperor in 712, but eventually lost favor to Consort Wu, partly because she never had a son. Her brother Wang Shouyi (王守一) tried to use magic to regain favor for her, but this was discovered, causing her to be deposed and Wang Shouyi to be forced to commit suicide in 724. She died soon thereafter.

== Background ==
It is not known when the future Empress Wang was born. Her father Wang Renjiao (王仁皎) traced his ancestry to the Liang dynasty official Wang Shennian (王神念). She married Li Longji as his wife and princess while he was the Prince of Linzi during the reign of either his grandmother Wu Zetian or his uncle Emperor Zhongzong. After Emperor Zhongzong died in 710, Emperor Zhongzong's wife Empress Wei took power as empress dowager and regent, but was soon overthrown by Li Longji and Emperor Zhongzong's sister Princess Taiping. It was said that as Li Longji was planning the coup, Princess Wang participated in the planning and supported him in the endeavor. After the successful coup, Li Longji's father Li Dan the Prince of Xiang, a former emperor, returned to the throne (as Emperor Ruizong). Li Longji was created crown prince, and Princess Wang became crown princess. She did not have a son herself, so she raised his second son Li Siqian, born of his then-favorite consort Consort Zhao, as her son (source?).

== As empress ==
In 712, Emperor Ruizong passed the throne to Li Longji, who took the throne as Emperor Xuanzong. Crown Princess Wang was created empress. Her father Wang Renjiao was made the minister of husbandry (太僕卿) and was eventually given the honorific title of Kaifu Yitong Sansi (開府儀同三司) and created the Duke of Qi.

In 713, Empress Wang ceremonially harvested mulberry leaves, to show the imperial household's attention to farming.

In 716, Empress Wang's brother-in-law Zhangsun Xin (長孫昕), who had a running dispute with the chief imperial censor Li Jie (李傑), lay in wait for Li Jie along with his brother-in-law Yang Xianyu (楊仙玉) and battered Li Jie severely. Li Jie submitted a petition accusing Zhangsun and Yang of the crime, and Emperor Xuanzong, in anger, executed Zhangsun and Yang.

In 719, Empress Wang's father Wang Renjiao died. Initially, Emperor Xuanzong approved a request by her brother Wang Shouyi, who had married Emperor Xuanzong's sister Princess Xue, that a grand tomb, on the scale built for Emperor Xuanzong's grandfather Dou Xiaochen (竇孝諶). However, the chancellors Song Jing and Su Ting opposed, pointing out that Dou's tomb was overly wasteful and that it should not be repeated. Emperor Xuanzong agreed, and reduced Wang Renjiao's tomb to be the usual scale for an official of the first grade.

Meanwhile, over the years, Empress Wang, because she had grown older and less beautiful, and also because she had not had a son, began to lose Emperor Xuanzong's favor. Consort Wu, the daughter of Wu Zetian's nephew Wu Youzhi (武攸止), began to be highly favored, and it was said that the ambitious Consort Wu had designs on the empress position. It was said that Empress Wang, displeased over her loss of favor, often argued with Emperor Xuanzong, drawing further disfavor from him. (However, on one occasion, when she reminded him that when they were still prince and princess, Wang Renjiao had, on one occasion, had to physically mill the flour to make noodle soup for his birthday, in such an exerting manner that Wang Renjiao's arms were purple with bruises, he was touched, but it did not reverse the trend.) In 722, Emperor Xuanzong secretly discussed with his close associate Jiang Jiao (姜皎) the possibility of deposing Empress Wang on account of her lack of a son. Jiang leaked the discussion, however, and Li Jiao (李嶠) the Prince of Teng (not the chancellor with the same name), a brother-in-law to Empress Wang, reported this to Emperor Xuanzong. In anger at Jiang's leaking the secret discussion, Emperor Xuanzong had the chancellor Zhang Jiazhen submit an indictment against Jiang. Both Jiang and his brother Jiang Hui (姜晦) were exiled.

After the Jiang Jiao incident, Empress Wang became even more fearful. It was said, however, that she was always gracious with the ladies in waiting and eunuchs, so no one reported anything negative about her. Emperor Xuanzong hesitated about what he would do. Meanwhile, though, it became known in 724 that Wang Shouyi had engaged the Buddhist monk Mingwu (明悟) to offer sacrifices to the Big Dipper and the Nandou (a Chinese constellation that is part of Sagittarius), and also had her wear an amulet made of wood struck by lightning, bearing the characters for heaven and earth, as well as Emperor Xuanzong's name, with the intent that these actions could perhaps help her have a son. On 15 August 724, Emperor Xuanzong deposed Empress Wang and housed her in a subsidiary palace. He also exiled Wang Shouyi, and on Wang Shouyi's way to exile, he ordered Wang Shouyi to commit suicide.

Three months after Empress Wang was deposed, she died. It was said that the ladies in waiting and the eunuchs all mourned her bitterly, and that Emperor Xuanzong himself regretted his actions deeply. In 762, during the reign of Emperor Xuanzong's grandson Emperor Daizong, her empress honors were posthumously restored.

== In fiction and popular culture ==
- Portrayed in The Legend of Lady Yang by Michelle Fung (2000)
- Portrayed in Deep in the Realm of Conscience by Nancy Wu (2018)

== Notes and references ==
Notes

Bibliography

- Old Book of Tang, vol. 51.
- New Book of Tang, vol. 76.
- Zizhi Tongjian, vols. 210, 211, 212.

Chinese royalty
Preceded by Empress Lu	Empress of the Tang dynasty 712–724	Succeeded by Empress Zhang
Preceded by Empress Lu	Empress of China (most regions); 712–724	Succeeded by Empress Zhang
Preceded by Empress Lu	Empress of China (Northern/Central); 712–724	Succeeded by Empress Duan of Yan
