= The Legend of Lady Yang =

- Poster
- Traditional Chinese: 楊貴妃
- Simplified Chinese: 杨贵妃
- Literal meaning: Yang Guifei
- Hanyu Pinyin: Yáng Guìfēi
- Jyutping: Joeng4 Gwai3 Fei1
- Genre: Historical fiction, costume drama, romance
- Written by: Chan Ching-yi; Chung Ching; Au-yeung San; Tsui Tat-chor
- Directed by: Lai Pak-kin; Leung Cheng-cheung; Sin Yin-fong; Wong Siu-ying; Ng Chun-chau
- Starring: Anne Heung; Kwong Wa; Melissa Ng; Florence Kwok; Louis Yuen
- Theme music composer: James Wong
- Opening theme: Nam Yee Joi Bat Fu Sam Ching (男兒再不負深情) performed by Amanda Lee
- Country of origin: Hong Kong
- Original language: Cantonese
- No. of episodes: 20

Production
- Executive producer: Chong Wai-kin
- Production location: Hong Kong
- Editor: Chan Ching-yi
- Running time: 45 minutes per episode
- Production company: TVB

Original release
- Network: TVB Jade
- Release: 21 February – 17 March 2000

The Legend of Lady Yang is a Hong Kong television series based on the romance between Emperor Xuanzong of the Tang dynasty and his consort Yang Yuhuan. The series was produced by TVB and it stars Anne Heung, Kwong Wa, Melissa Ng, Florence Kwok & Louis Yuen as the casts of this series. It was first aired on TVB Jade from February to March 2000 in Hong Kong.

== Plot ==
Falling for the reigning Emperor of Tang during a chanced encounter, orphan Yeung Yuk Wan's dreams seem to come true when she is summoned into the imperial palace as a candidate for Emperor Xuanzong's consort selection. Yeung quickly finds however, that the palace can be a cold and ruthless place where conniving consort and officials alike duel for power and the Emperor's favor is as much desired as it is potentially dangerous for the enemies it brings. Thrown into the middle of constant struggles for the Emperor's favor, Yeung soon learns that in a world where seemingly everyone has something to hide, trusted allies are as much a threat as hostile enemies. With the help of Yeung's cousin, Yeung Chiu, who enters the palace as an official, Yeung and the Emperor fight to embrace their seemingly tragic love in a world that appears determined to keep them apart. Neither they nor their allies however, are prepared for the full extent of what lays in store for them as their actions unknowingly set in motion a series of events that would bring about the An Lushan Rebellion.

== Cast ==
Note: Some of the characters' names are in Cantonese romanisation.

- Anne Heung as Yeung Yuk-wan
- Fiona Yuen as Yeung Yuk-yiu
- Lam Pui-yan as Yeung Yuk-ling
- Josephine Lam as Yeung Yuk-sau
- Wong Tin-dok as Yeung Yuen-gwai
- Ma Ching-yi as Yeung Yuen-gwai's wife
- Savio Tsang as Yeung Kwok-chung
- Kwong Wa as Lei Lung-kei
- Melissa Ng as Consort Mui
- Florence Kwok as Consort Mou
- Louis Yuen as On Luk-san
- Liu Kai-chi as Ko Lik-si
- Michelle Fung as Empress Wong
- Lily Leung as the Empress Dowager
- Kwok Fung as Lei Lam-fu
- Derek Kok as Wong-fu Wai-ming
- Candy Chiu as Consort Chiu
- Lo Chun-shun as Prince Ning
- Wong Chun-tong as Si Sze-ming
- Lee Kwok-lun as Kwok Tze-yi
- Gordon Liu as Chan Yuen-lai
- Wong Wai-leung as Lei Bak
- Tavia Yeung as Palace Maid
- Law Lan as Ominous Blind Woman
