= Chen Xuanli =

Chen Xuanli (陳玄禮) was the General Commander of the Imperial "Longwu Army" (龙武军) during the Chinese Tang dynasty. He was a loyal subject of Emperor Xuanzong of the Tang dynasty.

== Biography ==
Chen Xuanli started as a low officer guard in the palace and then helped Li Longji launch a successful coup, deposing Empress Dowager Wei in 710. After Li Longji took the throne as Emperor Xuanzong, Chen Xuanli was appointed commander of the Imperial Guard and became a trusted confidant of the emperor. In 755, Chen Xuanli escorted Emperor Xuanzong and Yang Guifei as they fled from Tang's capital, Chang'an, during the An Shi Rebellion. Chen Xuanli retired in September or October 760, and succumbed to illness in 762 A.D., the same year as Xuanzong's death.

== Rumors and Stories ==
During the execution of Yang Guifei, Chen secretly plotted with Gao Lishi to bring another woman to replace Yang. As Chen was in charge of examining Yang's body, he managed to facilitate her escape to Shankou County, Japan.

== In fiction & popular culture ==
- Portrayed by Gordon Liu in The Legend of Lady Yang. (2000)
