= Li Ying (prince) =

Chinese prince (died 737)

- Crown Prince
- Died: 737
- Spouse: Lady Xue
- Issue: Li Yan, Prince of Xinping; Li Shen, Prince of Pingyuan; Li Qian; Li Qiu, Prince of Qing; Li Bei; Li Jing
- Father: Emperor Xuanzong of Tang
- Mother: Consort Zhao

Li Ying (李瑛) (died c.June 737), né Li Siqian (李嗣謙), known from 725 to 736 as Li Hong (李鴻), was a crown prince of the Chinese Tang dynasty during the reign of his father Emperor Xuanzong. He was later removed and forced to commit suicide due to the machinations of Emperor Xuanzong's favorite and influential concubine Consort Wu and her powerful and corrupt ally, the chancellor Li Linfu.

== Background ==
It is not known when Li Siqian was born, but it is known that he was the second son of Li Longji, then the Prince of Linzi under Li Longji's uncle Emperor Zhongzong. His mother Consort Zhao, who would eventually receive the imperial consort rank of Lifei (麗妃), the second highest rank for imperial consorts, was said to be a prostitute who was capable in singing and dancing, and who became a concubine of Li Longji's when Li Longji was serving as the secretary general for Lu Prefecture (潞州, roughly modern Changzhi, Shanxi), in 708. In 710, after Li Longji's father Li Dan became emperor (as Emperor Ruizong), Li Longji was created crown prince, and his sons were created princes. Li Siqian was created the Prince of Zhending.

== During Emperor Xuanzong's reign ==
In 712, Emperor Ruizong passed the throne to Li Longji, who took the throne as Emperor Xuanzong. Li Siqian's title was upgraded to Prince of Ying. At this point, Consort Zhao was Emperor Xuanzong's favorite concubine, and he gave high official offices to her father Zhao Yuanli (趙元禮) and brother Zhao Changnu (趙常奴). Further, in 715, he created Li Siqian crown prince, even though Li Siqian was not his eldest son. (Emperor Xuanzong's eldest son Li Sizhi was alive, but his face might have already been badly injured, which was considered unfit for an emperor and might be the reason that he was never created crown prince.)

In 719, Li Siqian ceremonially donned adult clothing, and a ceremony was held at the imperial university to commemorate the beginning of his formal studies, with the official Chu Wuliang (褚無量) presiding.

Meanwhile, over the years, another concubine of Emperor Xuanzong's, Consort Wu gained great favor, and Empress Wang lost favor. In 724, Empress Wang's brother Wang Shouyi (王守一) was discovered to have used magic to try to regain favor for Empress Wang. Empress Wang was deposed and died soon thereafter, and Wang Shouyi was forced to commit suicide. Emperor Xuanzong considered creating Consort Wu empress, but eventually did not do so due to official opposition based on two grounds—that Consort Wu was of the family of Emperor Xuanzong's powerful grandmother Wu Zetian, who seized the throne herself for over a decade as "emperor" and interrupted the Tang dynasty, and that Consort Wu was not Li Siqian's mother and therefore might seek to endanger Li Siqian. Still, Consort Wu's son Li Qing (李清) the Prince of Shou became Emperor Xuanzong's favorite son, and Li Siqian began to lose favor.

In 725, Li Siqian's name was changed to Li Hong.

In 726, Li Hong's mother Consort Zhao died.

In 728, Emperor Xuanzong decreed a search among officials' daughters who could be the wife to Li Hong, and eventually selected the daughter of Xue Tao (薛縚) the deputy minister of ceremonies, to be Li Hong's wife and crown princess.

Meanwhile, Consort Wu had designs to have Li Qing, whose name was by then changed to Li Mao (李瑁), named crown prince. She and the official Li Linfu entered into an alliance, where Li Linfu agreed to help her to have Li Mao created crown prince, while she recommended Li Linfu to be chancellor. Li Linfu became chancellor in 734, and thereafter began to lobby on Li Mao's behalf.

In 736, Li Hong's name was changed to Li Ying.

At some point thereafter, there was a time when Li Ying met with his brothers Li Yao (李瑤) the Prince of E, born of Consort Huangfu, and Li Ju (李琚) the Prince of Guang, born of Consort Liu, and each of them was complaining about how their mothers, originally favored by Emperor Xuanzong, had lost favor to Consort Wu. Princess Xianyi's husband Yang Hui (楊洄) reported this to Consort Wu, and she tearfully accused Li Ying of defaming her and Emperor Xuanzong. Emperor Xuanzong, in anger, discussed the possibility of deposing Li Ying with the chancellors. The senior chancellor Zhang Jiuling firmly opposed this, and when Consort Wu sent her servant Niu Gui'er (牛貴兒) to try to lobby him, he refused and reported this to Emperor Xuanzong. Because of Zhang's firm opposition to Li Ying's removal—citing examples of Duke Xian of Jin, Emperor Wu of Han, Emperor Hui of Jin, and Emperor Wen of Sui, each of whose states was destroyed or greatly weakened as the result of a change in the crown prince position—it was said that Li Ying's position was firm for as long as Zhang remained chancellor, but after Zhang was removed later in 736, things began to change.

In 737, Consort Wu decided to try to trick Li Ying, Li Yao, and Li Ju. She had a message sent to the three princes, stating, "There are bandits in the palace. Please report at once in armor!" The three princes arrived in full armor, and she thereafter told Emperor Xuanzong, "The three princes are planning treason. Look, they have come in full armor." Emperor Xuanzong had his eunuchs check out the situation, and the three princes were seen in full armor. Yang Hui subsequently accused Li Ying, Li Yao, and Li Ju of treason. When Emperor Xuanzong discussed this with the chancellors, Li Linfu, by now the most powerful official at court, stated, "This is Your Imperial Majesty's family matter. We will not interfere." The three princes were soon reduced to commoner rank and forced to commit suicide. His sons were raised by his older brother Li Cong. A number of the clan members of his mother Consort Zhao and his wife Crown Princess Xue were exiled. After Li Ying's younger brother Emperor Suzong became emperor, he exonerated Li Ying and rehonored him as Crown Prince; at the same time, Emperor Suzong removed Consort Wu's posthumous honor as empress.

== Personal information ==
- Father
  - Emperor Xuanzong of Tang
- Mother
  - Consort Zhao (d. 726)
- Wife
  - Lady Xue, daughter of Xue Tao (薛縚), the Deputy Minister of Ceremonies
- Sons
  - Li Yan (李俨), Prince of Xinping
  - Li Shen (李伸), Prince of Pingyuan
  - Li Qian (李倩)
  - Li Qiu, Prince of Qing
  - Li Bei (李备)
  - Li Jing (李儆)
