= Li Mao =

- Prince of Shou
- Born: between March 720 and April 725
- Died: 12 February 775
- Spouse: Yang Yuhuan; Lady Wei
- Issue: Li Ai, Prince of Deyang; Li Bei, Prince of Jiyang; Li Zhan, Prince of Guangyang; Li Kang, Duke of Xue; Li Jie
Names
- Li Mao (李瑁)
- Father: Emperor Xuanzong of Tang
- Mother: Consort Wu

Li Qing (李清; 720s – 12 February 775), known as Li Mao (李瑁) from 725 and honored title Prince of Shou (壽王) was a prince of the Tang dynasty. He was the 18th son of Emperor Xuanzong and his mother was Xuanzong's favorite concubine Consort Wu.

== Family ==
- Father: Emperor Xuanzong of Tang
- Mother: Empress Zhenshun, of the Wu clan (貞順皇后 武氏; 699–737)

Consorts and issue:

- Consort Yang, of the Yang clan of Hongnong (弘農楊氏; 719–756), personal name Yuhuan (楊玉環)
- Princess Consort of Shou, of the Wei clan of Jingzhao (壽王妃 京兆韦氏), 3rd daughter of general Wei Zhaoxun (韦昭训)
  - Princess Yangcheng (阳城县主; 771 – 827), personal name Yingxuan (应玄), 22nd daughter
    - Married Qiu Yun and had issue ( five sons and four daughters)
- Unknown:
  - Li Ai, Prince of Deyang (德陽郡王 李僾), 1st son
  - Li Bei, Prince of Jiyang (济陽郡王 李伓), 2nd son
  - Li Zhan, Prince of Guangyang (广陽郡王 李偡), 3rd son
  - Li Kang, Duke of Xue (薛国公 李伉), 4th son
  - Li Jie (李傑), 5th son
  - Princess Qingyuan (清源县主, d. 757), 6th daughter

== Biography ==
Li Mao (李瑁) was a son of Emperor Xuanzong of Tang and his favorite consort, Consort Wu. Before him, his mother had several children, but all died in infancy. As such, he was raised in Li Chengqi's household, and Chengqi's wife Lady Yuan became his milk mother. He was made Prince of Shou on 27 April 725. On 10 Feb 736, Li Mao married the beautiful Yang Yuhuan (楊玉環), daughter of Yang Xuanyan (楊玄琰), who was a census official of Shu Prefecture (now 蜀州, in modern Chengdu, Sichuan). After his mother's death, Yang Yuhuan came into Xuanzong's favor and the emperor decided to take her as his consort. However, since Princess Yang was already the wife of his son, Emperor Xuanzong stealthily arranged for her to become a Taoist nun with the tonsured name Taizhen in order to prevent criticisms that would affect his plan of making her his concubine. Yang then stayed for a brief while as a Taoist nun in the palace itself before Emperor Xuanzong made her an imperial consort. Xuanzong bestowed Li Mao with a new wife, the third daughter of Wei Zhaoxun (韦昭训) on 28 August 745. Yang henceforth became the favorite consort of the emperor, just like Consort Wu before.

Li Mao died in February 775 during the reign of Emperor Daizong.
