= Empress Zhenshun =

Tang dynasty empress

Imperial Consort Wu
- Born: c. 698
- Died: c.January 738 (aged 39–40)
- Spouse: Emperor Xuanzong of Tang
- Issue: Li Yi, Prince Dao of Xia (夏悼王李一); Li Min, Prince Ai of Huai (懷哀王李敏); Princess Shangxian (上仙公主); Li Mao, Prince of Shou (壽王李瑁); Li Qi, Prince of Sheng (盛王李琦); Princess Xianyi (咸宜公主); Princess Taihua (太華公主)
Posthumous name
- Empress Zhenshun (貞順皇后)
- Father: Wu Youzhi
- Mother: Lady Yang

Consort Wu, imperial consort rank Huifei (武惠妃; c.698 – 1 January 738), posthumously Empress Zhenshun (貞順皇后, literally "the virtuous and serene empress"), was an imperial consort of the Chinese Tang dynasty, during the reign of Emperor Xuanzong. She was Emperor Xuanzong's favorite concubine during her lifetime, and after the death of his wife Empress Wang in 724, she became honored like an empress inside the palace, court, by the emperor and among the public until her death; Thus, she was the undisputed mistress of the palace, and wielded political power in the court and influence over the decisions of Emperor Xuanzong. She never formally became empress on account of her father Wu Youzhi (武攸止) being a nephew of Emperor Xuanzong's grandmother Wu Zetian, the memory about whose takeover of the Tang throne terrified the officials. But the power she gained within the palace and the political circles of the court, and the love of Emperor Xuanzong for her, made her authority and respect equal to the authority and respect of the empress.

== Background ==
The future Consort Wu was a daughter of Wu Youzhi, who was a grandson of Wu Zetian's uncle Wu Shirang (武士讓). After Wu Zetian became "emperor" in 690 after having been empress dowager over her sons Emperor Zhongzong and Emperor Ruizong, Wu Youzhi was created the Prince of Heng'an. The future Consort Wu was born sometime between 688 and 697. It was said that Wu Youzhi died when she was still young, and she entered the palace afterwards.

== As imperial consort ==
=== Before Empress Wang's removal ===
Sometime after Wu Zetian's grandson Emperor Xuanzong (Emperor Ruizong's son) became emperor in 712, Consort Wu became an imperial consort and was favored by him. Early in his Kaiyuan era (713–741), she successively gave birth to two sons, Li Yi (李一, posthumously honored Prince Dao of Xia) and Li Min (李敏, posthumously honored Prince Ai of Huai), and one daughter (posthumously honored Princess Shangxian), all of whom were described to be beautiful but all of whom died in their childhood (Li Yi in 717, Li Min in 720, and Princess Shangxian's death date is unknown). After she later gave birth to another son, Li Qing (李清), Emperor Xuanzong asked his brother Li Xian the Prince of Ning to raise the child, and Li Xian and his wife Princess Yuan raised the child personally.

Meanwhile, as Emperor Xuanzong's favors for Consort Wu waxed, his favors for his wife Empress Wang waned. It was said that Consort Wu was ambitious and, taking after Wu Zetian, had designs to be empress, and Empress Wang was often arguing with Emperor Xuanzong over the issue. In 722, Emperor Xuanzong discussed with his close associate Jiang Jiao (姜皎) deposing Empress Wang on the basis that Empress Wang did not have a son, but after Jiang leaked the news, Jiang was exiled, and Empress Wang remained in her position. In 724, however, Empress Wang's brother Wang Shouyi (王守一) was discovered to have engaged a Buddhist monk to use magic on her behalf and had her wear an amulet that he hoped would allow her to have a son. Empress Wang was deposed and died soon after.

=== After Empress Wang's removal ===
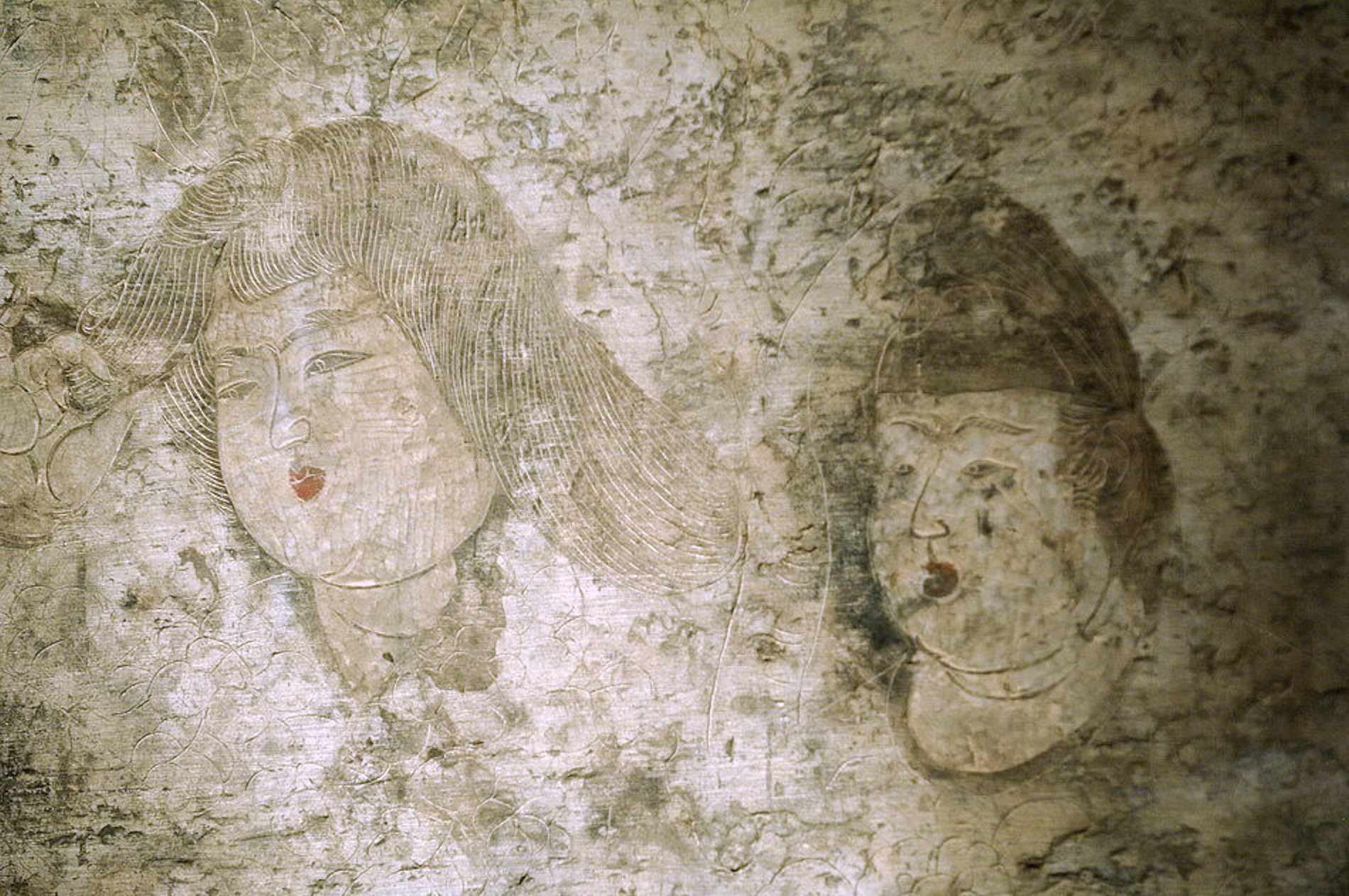
Wall painting from Zhenshun's tomb sarcophagus.

After Empress Wang was deposed, Emperor Xuanzong gave Consort Wu the highly honourable and impressive rank of Huifei, the highest rank possible for imperial consorts at that point, and in 726, he considered creating Consort Wu empress. However, this drew petitions of protest from his officials, the most famous of which stated, in fairly blunt language:

The Wus have an unbreakable enmity with the imperial clan. How can a member of that clan be the mother of the empire? The rumours all state that Zhang Yue [(a former chancellor who lost his post earlier in 726)] suggested this in order to become chancellor again. Not only this, but the Crown Prince [(Li Siqian, who was born of Consort Zhao, formerly Emperor Xuanzong's favorite concubine)] was not born of Consort Wu, who has her own sons. If she is created empress, the Crown Prince would be in danger.

Emperor Xuanzong did not create Consort Wu empress, but had the other concubines, ladies in waiting, and eunuchs all treat her as the empress inside the palace and the officials down to the people were asked to act in this way for her. Her mother Lady Yang was created the Lady of Zheng, and her brothers Wu Zhong (武忠) and Wu Xin (武信) became honoured officials. She had one more son, Li Qi (李琦) the Prince of Sheng, and two daughters, the Princesses Xianyi and Taihua.

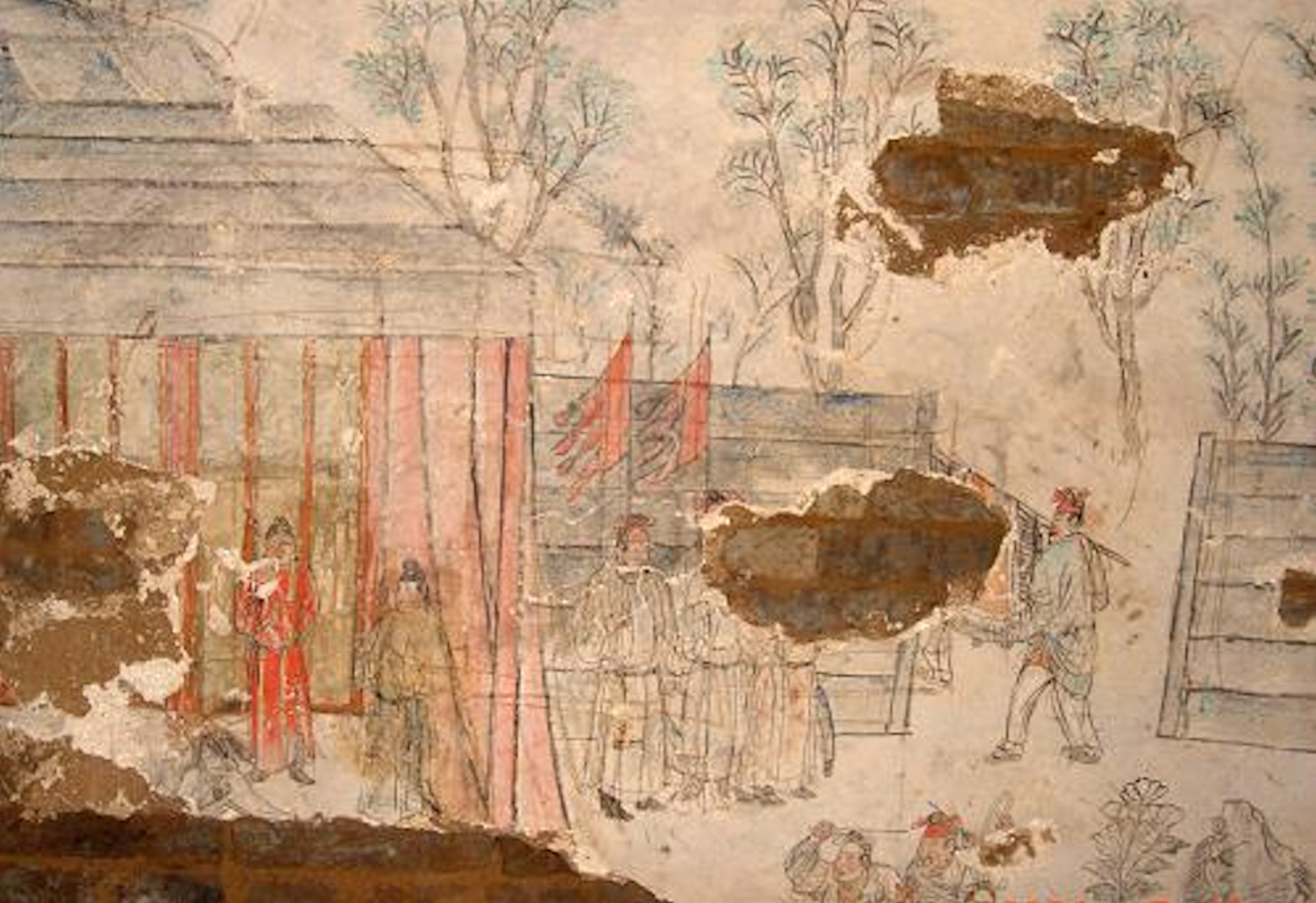
Wall painting from Zhenshun's tomb.

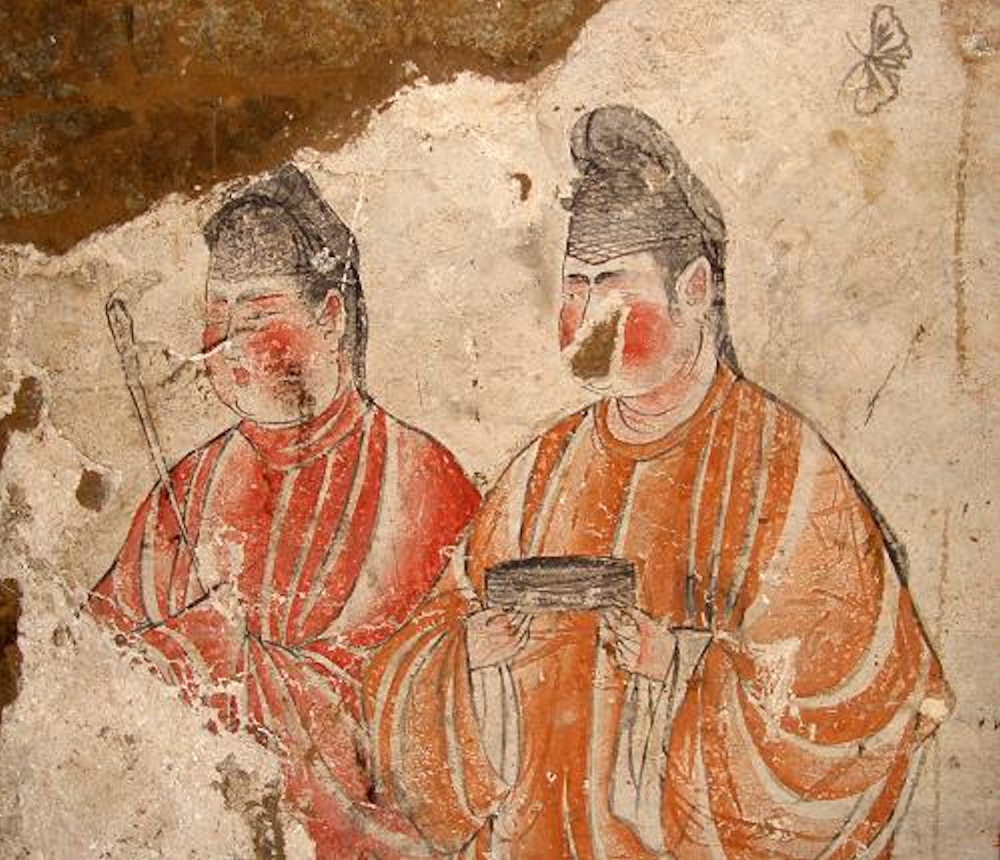
Wall painting from Zhenshun's tomb.

Meanwhile, Consort Wu had designs to have her oldest son Li Qing, whose name was by then changed to Li Mao (李瑁) and who had been created the Prince of Shou, named crown prince. She and the official Li Linfu entered into an alliance, where Li Linfu agreed to help her to have Li Mao created crown prince, while she recommended Li Linfu to be chancellor. Li Linfu became chancellor in 734, and thereafter began to lobby on Li Mao's behalf.

Some time later Li Siqian, whose name had by then been changed to Li Ying, met with his brothers Li Yao (李瑤) the Prince of E, born of Consort Huangfu, and Li Ju (李琚) the Prince of Guang, born of Consort Liu, and each of them was complaining about how their mothers, originally favoured by Emperor Xuanzong, had lost favor to Consort Wu. Princess Xianyi's husband Yang Hui (楊洄) reported this to Consort Wu, and she tearfully accused Li Ying of defaming her and Emperor Xuanzong. Emperor Xuanzong, in anger, discussed the possibility of deposing Li Ying with the chancellors. The senior chancellor Zhang Jiuling firmly opposed this, and when Consort Wu sent her servant Niu Gui'er (牛貴兒) to try to lobby him, he refused and reported this to Emperor Xuanzong. Because of Zhang's firm opposition to Li Ying's removal, it was said that Li Ying's position was firm for as long as Zhang remained chancellor, but after Zhang was removed in 736, things began to change.

In 737, Consort Wu decided to try to trick Li Ying, Li Yao, and Li Ju. She had a message sent to the three princes, stating, "There are bandits in the palace. Please report at once in armour!" The three princes arrived in full armour, and she told Emperor Xuanzong, "The three princes are planning treason. Look, they have come in full armour." Emperor Xuanzong had his eunuchs check out the situation, and the three princes were seen in full armour. Yang Hui subsequently accused Li Ying, Li Yao, and Li Ju of treason. When Emperor Xuanzong discussed this with the chancellors, Li Linfu, by now the most powerful official at court, stated that, "This is Your Imperial Majesty's family matter. We will not interfere." The three princes were soon executed. It was said that thereafter Consort Wu was often terrified by visions of the three princes in her dreams, and she offered sacrifices to them, but the dreams continued. She became ill, and died later that year in her 40s.

Emperor Xuanzong posthumously honoured her as empress and buried her with ceremonies due an empress, but he rebuffed proposals for mourning periods to be observed for her. However, due to her significant and widely known offence on three princes, her son did not succeed "crown-prince" title, and her "empress" title and all other honours was divested by the succeeding emperor, Suzong, who was also the foster son of Empress Wang.

== In fiction and popular culture ==
- Portrayed in The Legend of Lady Yang by Florence Kwok (2000)
- Portrayed in Lady of the Dynasty 2015 film by Joan Chen

== Notes and references ==
- Old Book of Tang, vol. 51.
- New Book of Tang, vol. 76.
- Zizhi Tongjian, vols. 211, 212, 213, 214.
