= Augusta Xu-Holland =

New Zealand actress

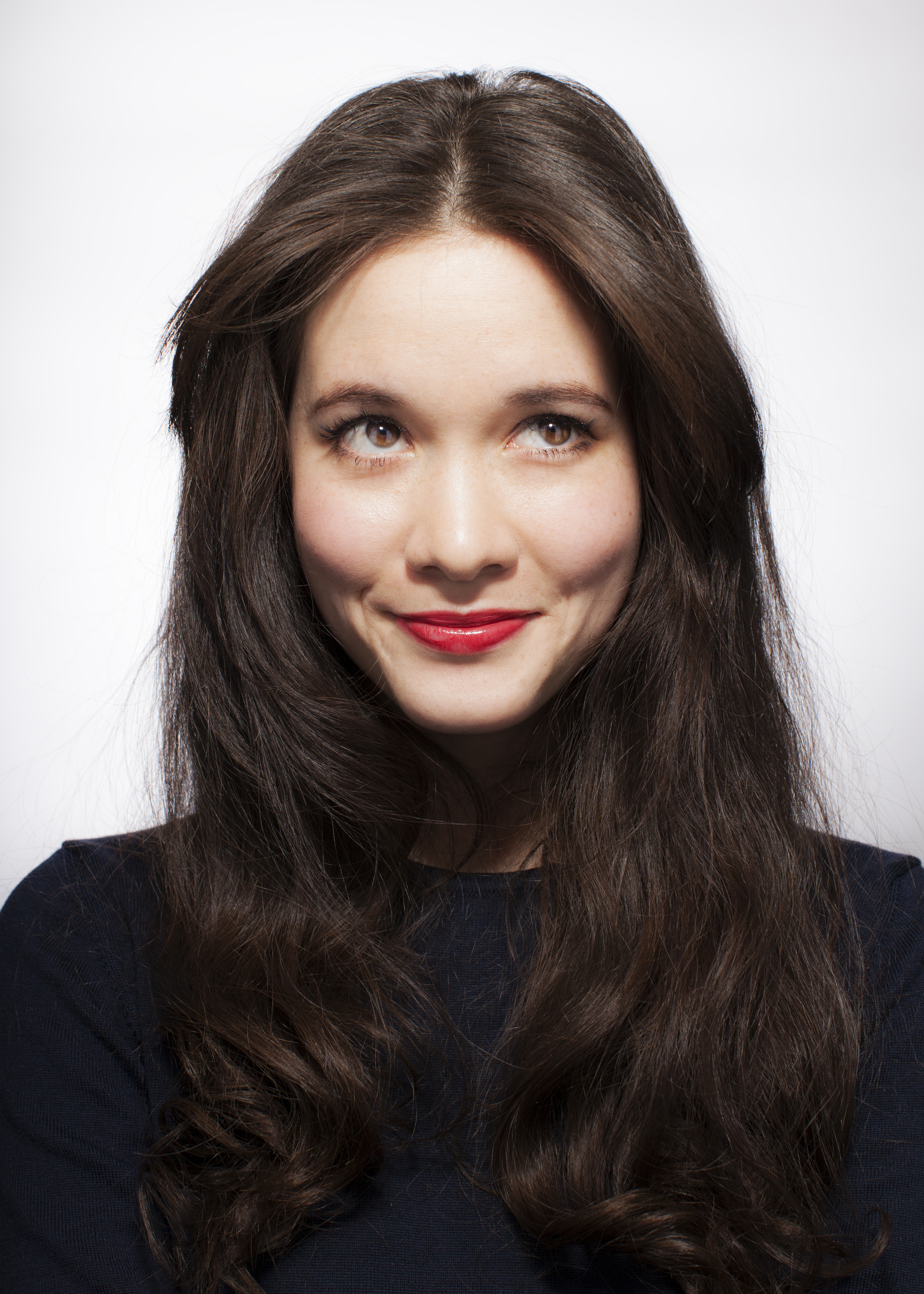
- Augusta Xu-Holland
- Born: 17 April 1991 (age 35); Auckland, New Zealand
- Occupations: Acting and Bioenergy
- Years active: 2016-present
- Known for: The Last Race, Borderland Love, The Eight Hundred

Chinese name
- Chinese: 徐嘉雯
Transcriptions
Standard Mandarin
- Hanyu Pinyin: Xú Jiāwén

Augusta Xu-Holland (Chinese: 徐嘉雯; born 17 April 1991) is a New Zealand actress.

== Early life and education ==
Xu-Holland was born in Auckland to a Chinese father and New Zealand mother and grew up in Wellington and the Bay of Plenty. From 2009 to 2013, she attended Victoria University for a bachelor's degree in biology and Asian studies. Upon graduation, she moved to China and worked in public relations and bioenergy at Kaidi New Energy Group, China's largest privately owned bioenergy company.

Shortly after deciding to become an actress in 2015, Xu-Holland was cast in a leading role in The Last Race alongside award-winning actors Joseph Fiennes and Shawn Dou.

== Career ==
=== China ===
Xu-Holland started her acting career in China-Hollywood co-production The Last Race (2016) directed by Stephen Shin. The Last Race is an unofficial sequel to the Academy Award winning story of Chinese-born Scottish Olympic gold medalist Eric Liddell, Chariots of Fire (1981). In The Last Race, Xu-Holland plays Catherine Standish, a fictional character whom Eric Liddell, played by Joseph Fiennes, gave up his chance of repatriation arranged between the British Prime Minister, Winston Churchill, and the Japanese government. Liddell later died in the Weixian Internment Camp in Weifang, China.

Xu-Holland is best recognized for her work in China, such as television series “Borderland Love” (2018) written by award-winning Chinese Gao Mantang and online film Special Mission (2018). In 2019, Xu-Holland stars in one of China's most highly anticipated films The Eight Hundred (2019) directed by Guan Hu, alongside Li Chen and Yao Chen.

=== Global ===
The US version of The Last Race was released under the title On Wings of Eagles in 2017. Unspoken Code (2018) won Best Narrative Short at the California International Shorts Festival and Best Short Film at the Female Eye Film Festival in Toronto. Xu-Holland has never received formal acting training, and attributes her skills to the scale of opportunities whilst working in China.

== Filmography ==
=== Film ===
Year	English Title	Chinese Title	Role	Notes
2016	The Last Race	终极胜利	Catherine Standish	Released in the US as On Wings of Eagles
2018	Unspoken Code		Rhonda	Short film
2018	Special Mission	特种使命之绿色军团	Lina	
2019	Meta Area	原脑:坏死区	Pudding	
2019	The Eight Hundred	八佰	Eva	Credited as Xu Jiawen
2019	Werewolf	狼人杀	Luna	Quadrilogy

=== Television series ===
Year	English Title	Chinese Title	Role	Notes
2018	Borderland Love	爱情的边疆	Wenwen	Also under the English name Frontier of Love
2022	Cupid's Kitchen		Elise	
