= Shanghai Fortress =

- Shanghai Fortress poster
- Traditional Chinese: 上海堡壘
- Simplified Chinese: 上海堡垒
- Hanyu Pinyin: Shànghǎi Bǎolěi
- Directed by: Teng Huatao
- Written by: Jiang Nan; Han Jinglong
- Based on: Shanghai Fortress by Jiang Nan
- Produced by: Wang Chen
- Starring: Lu Han; Shu Qi
- Production companies: China Entertainment Investment Group Limited by Share Ltd; China Film Group Corporation; Tianjin North Film Group; Beijing United Entertainment Partners Culture & Media Co., Ltd. Tencent Pictures
- Distributed by: China Film Group Corporation; Beijing United Entertainment Partners Culture & Media Co., Ltd.
- Release date: 9 August 2019 (China)
- Running time: 107 minutes
- Country: China
- Language: Mandarin
- Budget: $64,000,000
- Box office: $16,923,671

Shanghai Fortress (Chinese: 上海堡垒) is a 2019 Chinese science fiction action film directed by Teng Huatao and stars Lu Han and Shu Qi. Based on Jiang Nan's eponymous 2009 sci-fi novel (also translated as Once Upon a Time in Shanghai), the film depicts the human race's last stand in Shanghai fighting against aliens who try to seize a hidden energy source on earth in 2042. The film premiered in China on August 9, 2019. It was Godfrey Gao's final film before his death on November 27, 2019.

== Plot ==
In 2042, Shanghai becomes the last hope to defend humanity against the attack of an alien force that is besieging many cities around the world, to harvest hidden energy, found on earth. Young student Jiang Yang falls in love with Lin Lan, whom he follows to the fortress of Shanghai. From a young schoolboy in love and innocent, he will have to go through these dark and merciless hours to become, whatever the cost, the hero that humanity needs.

== Cast ==
- Lu Han as Jiang Yang (江洋)
- Shu Qi as Lin Lan (林澜)
- Godfrey Gao as Yang Jiannan (杨建南)
- Shi Liang as Shao Yiyun (邵一云)
- Wang Sen as Pan Hantian (潘翰田)
- Wang Gongliang as Zeng Yu (曾煜)
- Sun Jialing as Lu Yiyi (路依依)

== Production ==
The film is adapted from the 2006 novel of the same name by Jiang Nan.

6 years in production, and about ¥400 million yuan (US $57 million) budget, the film raked in just 119 million yuan in its opening weekend. Lu Han's salary for the film was rumoured to be ¥120 million yuan, however the director Teng Huatao clarified that it was not this high and sources suggested that Lu Han's salary for the film was between 2 - 4 million yuan.

== Release ==
The producer unveiled the first trailer for the film on February 10, 2019.

The film was released on August 9, 2019, in China.

== Reception ==
Douban, a major Chinese rating site, gave the film a rating of 3.0 out of 10. The film received highly negative reviews in China.

Viewers lamented on Sina Weibo that "it's not a sci-fi film but a half-baked May–December love story between Shu Qi and Lu Han with a few sci-fi elements." Director Teng Huatao apologized on his social media on Sina Weibo for letting viewers down. Screenwriter and original novel writer Jiang Nan also apologized online, particularly to the fans of his book who were disappointed after waiting so many years for the film. On August 13, 2019, the producer apologized for using original video material from Shawn Wang in promoting the film.
