= 九州 =

九州 ("nine provinces") may refer to:

- Kyushu, an island of Japan
- Nine Provinces, an ancient division of China
- Novoland
