= Chen Ruoxuan =

Chinese actor

- Born: Chen Shuang Qing; 16 October 1994 (age 31); Zibo, Shandong Province, China
- Education: Central Academy of Drama
- Occupation: Actor
- Years active: 2014–present
- Mother: Ji Yong Fen

Chinese name
- Simplified Chinese: 陈若轩
Transcriptions

Chen Ruoxuan (Chinese: 陈若轩, born Chen Shuang Qing, 16 October 1994) is a Chinese actor. He is best known for his roles in Novoland: The Castle in the Sky and Evil Minds.

== Early life ==
Chen was born on October 16, 1994, in Zibo, Shandong Province. He graduated from the Central Academy of Drama.

== Career ==
Chen Ruoxuan made his acting debut in the shenmo television series The Investiture of the Gods 2. Thereafter he took the lead role in the crime web series Evil Minds, based on the novel of the same name by Lei Mi. The series was a modest success with 530 million views.

In 2016, Chen played one of the lead roles in the segment "Hu Si" of the shenmo drama Legend of Nine Tails Fox, and played a supporting role in the fantasy drama Novoland: The Castle in the Sky. In particular, his role as Yu Huanzhen in Novoland: The Castle in the Sky was well-received and led to increased recognition for him. He reprised his role as Fang Mu in the second season of the crime web series Evil Minds.

Branching out to different genres, Chen starred in the youth melodrama The Endless Love and the campus romance drama Beyond Light Years. He then starred in the fantasy epic drama Novoland: Eagle Flag.

== Filmography ==
=== Film ===
Year	English title	Chinese title	Role	Notes
2013	All the Way with You These Years	这些年一路有你		Short film
2014	Love With A Woman	全世界最勇敢的女孩	Da Nan	Short film
2014	Ai Mi and Chao Shuai	艾米与超帅	Chao Shuai	Short film
2015	Dreams For The Best	醉青春		Short film
2019	Black and White Warriors	黑白无双	Xiao Hei	

=== Television series ===
Year	English title	Chinese title	Role	Notes
2015	The Investiture of the Gods 2	封神英雄	Yin Hong	
2015	Evil Minds	心理罪	Fang Mu	
2015	Dreamer	你是猪么	Groom	Cameo
2016	Legend of Nine Tails Fox	青丘狐传说	Zhang Sheng	
2016	The Lover's Lies	爱人的谎言	Tong Xiaochun	
2016	Novoland: The Castle in the Sky	九州·天空城	Yu Huanzhen	
2016	Huajianghu	画江湖之不良人	Nanyin Ke	
2016	Weapon & Soul	器灵	Liu Mingrui	
2016	Evil Minds 2	心理罪第二季	Fang Mu	
2016	Distressed Beauty	卿本佳人	Ma Jingan	
2017	The Endless Love	路从今夜白之遇见青春	Gu Yebai	
2018	Beyond Light Years	初遇在光年之外	Lu Yuchen	
2018	Beauties in the Closet	柜中美人	Li Yuxi	
2018	Siege in Fog	人生若如初相见	Murong Feng	
2019	Novoland: Eagle Flag	九州缥缈录	Ji Ye	
2020	iPartment 5	爱情公寓5	Jack	Cameo
TBA	Xixi Fosi's Cuisine	西西弗斯的料理	Xixi Fosi	
TBA	Magical Legend	平妖传之天书奇谭	Jin Chengyu	
TBA	Legend of Fei	有翡	Li Sheng	
TBA	Fire	浴火	Wei Ran	

== Awards and nominations ==
Year	Award	Category	Nominated work	Result	Ref.
2019	Golden Bud - The Fourth Network Film And Television Festival	Best Actor	Novoland: Eagle Flag	Nominated	
2019	Golden Bud - The Fourth Network Film And Television Festival	Leaping Actor of the Year	Novoland: Eagle Flag	Won	
2019	Sina Fashion Awards	Most Promising Artist of the Year	—N/a	Won	
