= Legend of Nine Tails Fox =

Chinese television series

- Promotional poster
- Also known as: Green Hill Fox Legend
- Genre: Fantasy; Romance
- Based on: Strange Tales from a Chinese Studio by Pu Songling
- Written by: Wang Lizhi; Fang Qiang Qiang
- Directed by: Lin Yufen; Gao Linbao; Xu Huikang
- Starring: See below
- Opening theme: To Ask the Moon by Yisa Yu
- Ending theme: The Wind's Love by Gong Shujun
- Country of origin: China
- Original language: Chinese
- No. of episodes: 32

Production
- Producers: Karen Tsoi; Lee Kwok-lap
- Production locations: Hengdian Studios, Xiandu, Yading
- Camera setup: Multiple-camera setup
- Running time: 45 minutes
- Production company: Tangren Media Co. Ltd.

Original release
- Network: Hunan Broadcasting System (Hunan TV)
- Release: 8 February – 15 March 2016

Legend of Nine Tails Fox (Chinese: 青丘狐传说; pinyin: Qīngqiūhú Chuánshuō) is a 2016 Chinese television series based on six tales in Strange Tales from a Chinese Studio by Pu Songling. It originally aired two episodes daily on Hunan TV, Sunday through Tuesday at 22:00, as well as being simultaneously broadcast online on Youku, Tencent, Sohu and iQiyi. The drama was directed by Liu Yufen, Gao Linbao and Xu Huikang, and stars an ensemble cast of actors. The drama is separated into six plots, based on the corresponding stories in the Strange Tales from a Chinese Studio.

== Synopsis ==
Adapted from six tales of Strange Tales from a Chinese Studio, the plot begins when a magic fruit of Qing Qiu is stolen with Fei Yue as the only witness.

"A Xiu" (ep. 1–7): Exorcist Zhuo Yun accuses the fox spirit Hua Yue of being a homewrecker, causing pain to mortals. After a brief battle, Hua Yue manages to escape but injures her ankle while saving a mortal woman named A Xiu. To repay Hua Yue for saving her life, A Xiu takes Hua Yue home to recover and the two become good friends. While hiding in A Xiu's father's home, Hua Yue discovers A Xiu is also hiding a relationship with Liu Zigu, an incompetent scholar.

A Xiu's father subsequently moves the family away to marry his daughter off to someone else, prompting Zigu to attempt suicide. Fearing he would try again after she saved him, Hua Yue turns herself into A Xiu to buy time before the real A Xiu can return. However, Hua Yue receives news of A Xiu's sudden death so she continues to act as A Xiu, despite Zhuo Yun's warnings. It turns out A Xiu has not died and finally returns to Zigu, but Hua Yue has already fallen in love with Zigu as well, so the three are caught in a love triangle and Zigu is unable to choose between the two women.

Meanwhile, one of Hua Yue's suitors is murdered by another demon spirit and Zhuo Yun mistakenly believes it was Hua Yue's doing, so he attacks her. A Xiu jumps in between them and dies from the blow. Eventually, Hua Yue sacrifices her years of cultivation to bring A Xiu back, Hua Yue's beautiful appearance reduced to her true aged form, and returns to Qing Qiu alone.

"Feng San Niang" (ep. 7–12): Fox Granny tracks the magic fruit thief to the Meng family's estate, home of Meng Ande and Meng Anren, who is rumored to be an unscrupulous court official. As Fox Granny prepares to send Liu Changyan to retrieve the magic fruit, Fei Yue also sneaks in as the handmaiden of Fan Qianru, Meng Ande's wife. During her search of the magic fruit and investigation of Anren, Fei Yue falls in love with him but soon realizes Anren will prioritize his own agenda over anyone else, even lying to her and offering her to the emperor. Meanwhile, Changyan correctly deduces Qianru is the actual thief and a golden fox of Qing Qiu. Out of frustration of being lied to, Fei Yue exposes Qianru's true form to her husband, who then fears her.

Back in Qing Qiu, Qianru admits she stole the magic fruit but also lost it during her battle with Fei Yue, and is imprisoned for her deeds. At Qianru's request, Fei Yue returns to the Meng estate to check on Ande and ultimately reconciles with Anren. As Anren prepares to marry Fei Yue and leave the courts for good, the emperor orders Anren to marry the princess. After Fei Yue proves Anren's love for her, the princess grants them leave and Fei Yue also leaves Qing Qiu to spend time with Anren. Due to Changyan's plea for leniency, Fox Granny releases Qianru from prison and Qianru convinces Ande to take her back.

"Ying Ning" (ep. 12–18): On Ying Ning's 16th birthday, she's finally able to visit the mortal realm, much to the dismay of her guardian Lan Yi. Immediately, she meets Wang Zifu, who lets her stay at his family's estate, where Ying Ning recognizes the same flower field and old barn from her nightmares. As the family's workers start seeing ghosts, Zifu's mother enlists exorcist Cao Fei to investigate. After an incident at the abandoned barn, Zifu learns of Ying Ning's fox identity.

Eventually, Lan Yi comes to take Ying Ning back, but is interrupted by Cao Fei. After their battle, Lan Yi explains that her sister, Lan Xiaodie, fell in love with Zifu's uncle Qin Sheng and gave birth to Ying Ning. Years later, Zifu's first wife sent for the family of three, claiming to accept Xiaodie, but it turned out to be a trap set by Zifu's mother and Cao Fei, resulting in Xiaodie's death.

Lan Yi convinces Ying Ning to return to Qing Qiu, but Zifu, with the help of Hua Yue, convinces Lan Yi that he truly loves Ying Ning and would protect her. Despite several schemes by Zifu's mother, Zifu and Ying Ning leave the Wang estate, but Cao Fei murders Zifu to awaken Ying Ning's powers. Overcome with anger and a dark aura that slowly destroys her, Ying Ning seeks revenge. However, Zifu appears in a vision, persuading her to stop thinking about revenge. Ying Ning decides to stay in the mortal realm to take care of the Wang family's business. Meanwhile, Cao Fei goes insane from taking multiple demonic cultivations for his own gain.

"Hu Si" (ep. 18–24): Silver fox spirit Hu Si has failed 76 relationships, so Fox Granny banishes him to the mortal realm until he understands true love. In the mortal realm, he meets Zhong Qing, who was left at the altar by her betrothed, Zhang Sheng. Infuriated, Zhong Qing asks Hu Si to help her seek revenge by killing Zhang Sheng, who is also being hunted by Maoshan Heidao, another fox clan that murders womanizers. Unfortunately, Hu Si accidentally loses his memory and mistakes Zhang Sheng for his best friend and savior, becoming attached to him.

As they travel, they encnounter Zhong Qing, who pretends not to know either of them. Zhang Sheng asks her to act as Hu Si's betrothed so he can secretly get rid of both of them. Before long, the three are caught in a web of affection but mistrust. Maoshan Heidao eventually restores Hu Si's memory to resume his plan for revenge. However, instead of seeking revenge, Hu Si forces Zhong Qing and Zhang Sheng to admit their love for each other. He shows Maoshan Heidao that Zhang Sheng isn't a womanizer, prompting her to turn over a new leaf and change her name to Xiao Hua. Hu Si then leaves Qing Qiu to be with her.

"Chang Ting": A wolf demon breaks into the Weng estate, stealing the magic fruit from Hui Er, the second uncle. Weng Changting and exorcist Shi Taipu chase after the wolf demon but lose her when Shi is injured, and the wolf demon is secretly killed by Hui Er. This devastates the wolf demon's husband, prompting him to curse Hongting as revenge. Changting asks Shi to stay at their estate to help get rid of the wolf demon, but he soon realizes the entire Weng family and their workers are foxes. Despite his discovery, he stays to keep the Weng family safe but severs his friendship with Changting.

As the wolf demon's threat looms, Changting pleads with Shi to teach her demon-slaying skills to protect her family. When her skills prove insufficient, her father decides to let the two lovers marry if Shi protects the family. However, the father regrets his decision and tries to get rid of him. On their wedding day, Shi is poisoned and left for dead while the whole Weng family escapes with the unconscious Changting.

Shi Taipu returns to his temple and attempts to kill the entire family, but after Changting sacrifices herself to protect him, he saves her against his master's wishes. The two later live together in solitude, but Changting is later called back by Chang Yan to help look for Hui Er.

"Heng Niang": The goddess Nuwa gives the foxes one last chance and tasks Liu Chang Yan with seeking the nine-tailed guardian fox, Tao Heng, for help in defeating Hui Er and finding the baby girl that is destined to save the fox nation. Disguised as a couple, they infiltrate the capital. Meanwhile, their neighbor, Ms. Hong, seeks Tao Heng's assistance to win back her husband's favor from his concubine, Ying Er. Tao advises Ms. Hong to reject her husband's advances and live a simpler life among the servants. Ms. Hong follows Tao's advice, succeeds in reconciling with her husband, and restores their relationship.

In the capital, Ninth Young Master falls in love with Tao Heng at first sight and tries to create opportunities to be close to her, but ends up embarrassing himself. Angry that Mr. Hong is devoted only to his wife, Ying Er decides to seduce Ninth Young Master. She also discovers that Tao Heng was instrumental in changing Mr. Hong's heart towards his wife.

During this time, Hui Er breaks into Ninth Young Master's room and manipulates him into attempting to kill Liu Chang Yan to get to Tao Heng. The attempt fails, and it is revealed that Tao Heng is pregnant with Ninth Young Master's child. However, Ninth Young Master wants the child dead. Mr. Hong helps Liu and Tao escape back to Qing Qiu after they complete their mission.

Later, Hui Er reappears and kidnaps the child. In a confrontation, the child defeats Hui Er and retrieves the Mei fruit.

== Cast ==
A Xiu

- Chen Yao as Hua Yue
- Zhang Ruoyun as Liu Zi Gu
- Qiao Xin as A Xiu
- Yao Yi Chen as Zuo Yun
- Wengfu as the mountain demon
- Wang Chunyuan as A Xiu's father
- Qu Zheming as Gao young master
- Mei Fet As Yeon Mow

Feng San Niang

- Jiang Kaitong as Feng Feiyue
- Zhai Tianlin as Meng Anren
- Chen Tingjia as Fan Qianru
- Wang Chuang as Meng Ande
- Dai Xuyi as He Liang
- Hai Ling as the princess
- Su Mao as Prime minister Zhao Gang
- Zong Fengyan as the Emperor

Ying Ning

- Yang Caiqi as Ying Ning
- Fu Xinbo as Wang Zifu
- Wang Ni'en as Lan XiaoDie
- Wang Yansu as Lan Yi (aunt)
- Li Qinqin as Wang's mother
- Zhang Lei as Cao Daozhang
- Li Sicheng as Wu Sheng

Hu Si

- Mike D'Angelo as Hu Si/Gu Yue
- Tang Yi Xin as Zhong Qing/Jing Qing
- Chen Ruoxuan as Zhang Sheng/Niu Yi
- Tao Yang as Xiao Shi
- Fu Mei as Maoshao Heidao
- Gong Fangmin as Old boss

Chang Ting

- Gina Jin as Weng Changting
- Wang Kai as Shi Taipu
- Zhang Xueying as Weng Hongting
- Fu Juan as Old man Weng
- Shao Min as Weng's mother
- Li Yu as Hui'er
- Zhang Haoran as Wolf demon
- Fei Er as Wolf demon's wife
- Ye Kaiwen as Xiao Shitou

Heng Niang

- Jiang Jinfu as Liu Chang Yan
- Gülnezer Bextiyar as Tao Heng
- Liu Yase as Su Xi
- Wang Zhixuan as Ninth Consort
- You Jingru as Ying Er
- Qiang Yu as Ninth young master
- Jiang Chen as Zhu Shi

=== Others ===
- Qiao Hong as Fox grandmother
- Zhu Pengcheng as Hong Pao Lao Dao
- Yue Junling as Bai Pao Lao Dao
- Wang Yonglin as Liu Jiading
- Wang Zhen as Xiao Taozi

== Production ==
Legend of the Nine-tails Fox's production team constructed the six stories in a fantasy world that tells love, joy, and sorrows. The fox spirits mysterious charm and attitude in Chinese classical literature was inspiration for the many characters. Other than the three directors, Liu Yufen, Gao Linbao, and Xu Huikang, notable players in the production process include Wang Lizhi and Fang Qiang Qiang as screenwriters, as director of photography Gao Xinjian, Li Da Chao and Li Lei as action/stunt team directors, Wu Baoling as the artistic/visual director. Cai Yi Nong, a producer, revealed that the formation of the Legend of Nine Tails Fox stories were completely by accident, and that she and several co-screenwriters chatted about the story in Hangzhou during a vacation. They wanted to do an original fantasy story with Strange Tales, with the fox's view of the world as its main structure.

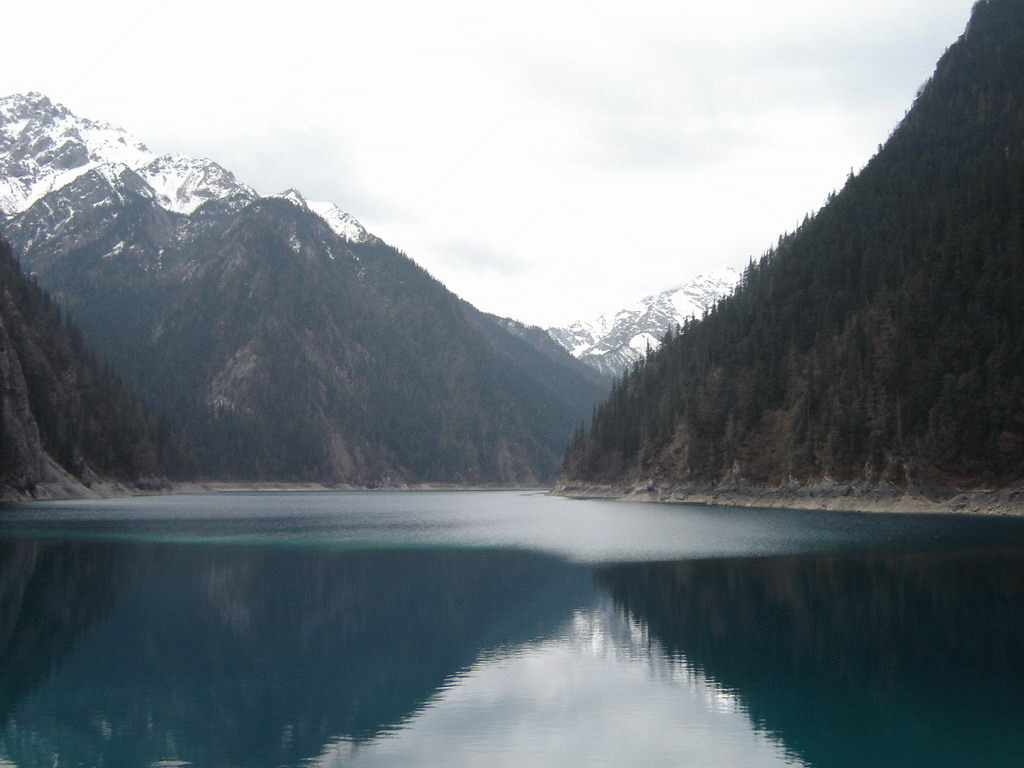
Lake at Jiuzhaigou Valley in Sichuan Province

The setting of the drama has been compared to The Wizard of Oz's fantasy world. In the trailer, the use of aerial shots was also incorporated with traditional shooting. The drama's trailer revealed up to 80 special effects (CGI) shots, with many involving mammals (foxes, rats, etc.), fighting scenes, towering trees and magic effects. The filming crew traveled to Sichuan and other locations, including 4000-meter high Hengduan Mountain ranges in Daocheng County. Location filming began on April 21, 2015, at Hengdian World Studios, and ended in July 2015, where it entered post-production. "Heng Niang" was filmed in Zhejiang Xiandu, while "Chang Ting" was shot at in the streets of Hengdian.

On December 28, 2015, Zi Long Hu Entertainment announced that a role-playing mobile game based on the series would be created. Also called Legend of Nine Tails Fox, it was released on January 21, 2016. It conveys the characters and a 3D world based on the drama's.

== Soundtrack ==
Chinese singer, Yisa Yu, released the single To Ask the Moon (问明月) as the series' theme song; the music video was released on January 15, 2016. The next OST single, The Wind's Love (风之恋) was released with its music video a week later, featuring Sharon Kwan's vocals. The songs were written by Yi Rui and composed by Gong Shu Jun. On January 28, Don't Make Me Cry (别惹哭我) was released with its music video. The song was written by Li Jiang Liang, composed by A Chao, and sung by Taiwanese singer, Claire Kuo.

== Ratings ==
China Hunan TV/ Online premiere ratings
Episodes	Broadcast date	Network ratings (CSM52)			CSM Online ratings		
Episodes	Broadcast date	Ratings (%)	Audience share (%)	Rankings	Ratings (%)	Audience share (%)	Rankings
1-2	February 8, 2016	0.609	3.125	1	1.13	7.39	1
3-4	February 9, 2016	0.740	3.899	1	1.27	8.13	1
5-6	February 14, 2016	0.558	2.865	2	0.96	6.23	1
7-8	February 15, 2016	0.688	3.491	2	1.08	6.95	1
9-10	February 16, 2016	0.653	3.438	2	1.16	7.65	1
11-12	February 21, 2016	0.492	2.530	2	0.87	5.55	1
13-14	February 23, 2016	0.416	2.274	1	0.71	4.99	1
15-16	February 28, 2016	0.295	1.500	1	0.52	3.58	1
17-18	February 29, 2016	0.363	2.056	2	0.47	3.81	1
19-20	March 1, 2016	0.370	2.121	1	0.52	4.04	1
21-22	March 6, 2016	0.431	2.376	1	0.56	4.62	1
23-24	March 7, 2016	0.353	2.034	2	0.57	4.78	1
25-26	March 8, 2016	0.450	2.703	1	0.66	5.41	1
27-28	March 13, 2016	0.494	2.735	1	—	—	—
29-30	March 14, 2016	0.462	2.183	2	0.60	5.06	1
31-32	March 15, 2016	0.524	3.051	1	0.62	5.07	1
Average ratings		0.494	2.625		0.78	5.55	

- Highest ratings are marked in red, lowest ratings are marked in blue
