= Novoland =

Novoland (Chinese: 九州; pinyin: Jiǔzhōu) is a media franchise consisting of thirty books by seven principal authors. It details a shared fictional universe, with a known world of three continents and nine provinces; divided into the prosperous Eastern Land and the nomadic Eight Tribes. It spans a history of 10000 years divided into 10 eras and about 16 dynasties.

== Novels ==
=== Jiang Nan (江南) ===
- Novoland: Eagle Flag:

- Novoland: Eagle Flag 1 - Wasteland (九州·缥缈录I·蛮荒)
- Novoland: Eagle Flag 2 - Ancient Clouds and Teeth (九州·缥缈录II·苍云古齿)
- Novoland: Eagle Flag 3 - Famous Generals in the World (九州·缥缈录III·天下名将)
- Novoland: Eagle Flag 4 - War Against Chenyue (九州·缥缈录IV·辰月之征)
- Novoland: Eagle Flag 5 - Lifetime Alliance (九州·缥缈录V·一生之盟)
- Novoland: Eagle Flag 6 - Soul of Leopard (九州·缥缈录VI·豹魂)

- Novoland: Assassin's Kingdom:

- Novoland: Assassin's Kingdom - Sunflower (九州·刺客王朝·葵)
- Novoland: Assassin's Kingdom - Lotus (九州·刺客王朝·莲)

- Novoland: Maneuver:

- Novoland: Maneuver - Dragon Slayer (九州·捭阖录·屠龙之主)

- Novoland: Book of Turbulence:

- Novoland: Book of Turbulence - Shang Boliang (九州·飘零书·商博良)
- Novoland: Book of Turbulence - Return to Ruins (九州·飘零书·归墟)

=== Pan Haitian (潘海天) ===
- Novoland: The Dark Veld (九州·白雀神龟) (2006)
- Novoland: Rock Labyrinth (九州·铁浮图) (2007)
- Novoland: Tales of the Dead (九州·死者夜谈) (2008)
- Novoland: Advance of the Dark Moon (九州·暗月将临)

=== Jinhezai (今何在) ===
- Storm of Prophecy (海上牧云记)
- Legend of Winged Tribe (羽传说)

=== Zhan'an (斩鞍) ===
Unlike other authors, he focuses on commoner's tales rather than heroes and monarchs.

- Novoland: Traveler (九州·旅人)
  - 九州·怀人
  - 九州·柏舟
  - 九州·流火
  - 九州·白驹
  - 九州·博上灯
  - 九州·山中鼓
  - 九州·水晶劫
  - 九州·落花溪
  - 九州·崔罗石
  - 九州·秋林箭
- Novoland: Tales of Beauties (九州·朱颜记)
- 九州·青蘅传

=== Tang Que (唐缺) ===
He wrote mostly short novels telling a single event rather than long epics.

- Novoland: Hero (九州·英雄) (2007)
- Novoland: Trace of the star (九州·星痕) (2009)
- 九州·云之彼岸 (2009)
- 九州·龙痕 (2009)
- Novoland: Revival (九州·轮回之悸) (2010)
- 九州·丧乱之瞳 (2011)
- 九州·魅灵之书 (2011)
- Novoland: The Son of Darkness (九州·黑暗之子) (2013)

== Live adaption ==
Year	English Title	Chinese Title	Notes
2015	The Lure of the Hua Xun Song	华胥引之绝爱之城	Based on the novel Hua Xu Yin by Tang Qi Gongzi
2016	Novoland: The Castle in the Sky	九州·天空城	The Series, Based on an original story
2017	Legend of the Naga Pearls	鲛珠传	The Movie, Set in the same premise as Novoland: The Castle in the Sky
2017	Tribes and Empires: Storm of Prophecy	九州·海上牧云记	The Series, Based on the novel of the same name by Jin Hezai
2019	Novoland: Eagle Flag	九州·缥缈录	The Series, Based on the novel of the same name by Jiang Nan
2020	Novoland: The Castle in the Sky 2	九州·天空城2	The Series, Sequel to Novoland: The Castle in the Sky
2020	Novoland: The Castle in the Sky - Time Reversal	九州天空城之时光回转	The Movie, Spin-off and prequel to Novoland: The Castle in the Sky
2021	Suffering of Love	九州羽乱·相思劫	The Series, Adapted from the novel "Jiu Zhou Yu Luan" (九州羽乱) by Tang Que (唐缺)
2021	Novoland: Pearl Eclipse	九州·斛珠夫人	The Series, Based on the novel of the same name by Xiao Ruse
2022	Novoland: The Princess From Plateau	九州·朱颜记	The Series, Adapted from the novel "Novoland: Tales of Beauties" (九州·朱颜记) by Zhan An (斩鞍)
2022	Novoland Floating Heart	九州青荇纪	The Movie, about Nan Xing, who is the only daughter of the imperial Preceptor, Nan Yan
