= Dragon Raja (Chinese novels) =

Novel series by Jiang Nan

Dragon Raja (Chinese: 龙族; pinyin: Lóngzú) is a series of fantasy novels written by Chinese author Jiang Nan.

The story consists of five story arcs (the first four have been compiled into 6 published novels), as well as a prequel short story and an anthology novella.

Since the release of the first volume on April 1, 2010, the series has gained immense popularity, critical acclaim and commercial success in China, each and every one of the first 6 titles of the series reached the best seller list with more than 2,000,000 copies sold. The series has been praised for attracting young readers, and has remained one of the preeminent cornerstones of youth and fantasy literature. Due to its financial success, the series kickstarted a commercially successful franchise, and has been adapted into manhua, video games and animation.

== Publication history ==
The series was first published in Manke's Fiction Painting (小说绘, Xiǎoshuō huì) magazine, in the form of a serialized novel. The first story arc was originally titled "Longzú: Eragon", later changed to "Longzú: Dragon Raja". After its completion, it was compiled, shortened and partially rewritten to be published as a physical novel titled "Dragon Raja I: The Blazing Dawn" (龙族I火之晨曦, Lóngzú I huǒ zhī chénxī).

This process was repeated for the rest of the series. The third story arc went through substantial re-writes before being compiled into three novels. "Dragon Raia IV" was the last series to be published in a physical format. The fifth story arc (Dragon Raja V) started serialization in 2015, but was put on hiatus in 2019 and officially canceled in 2022.

A "revised edition" of Dragon Raja I & II was released in 2020, followed by a similar release of Dragon Raja III in 2021. In 2022, a new version of Dragon Raja IV was published online as a web novel titled Dragon King: World Reset (龙王：世界的重启) with a similar remake of Dragon Raja V announced in 2023.

Other works were published aside from the main entries, including a prequel titled "The Mourning Wings" (哀悼之翼; Āidào zhī Yì) and the anthology novella "Dragon Raja: Strange Tales" (龙族异闻录, Lóngzú yì wén lù).

The series deals with themes of self worth, courage, persistence and the true meaning of friendship, and growing up in a world full of unexpected challenges. At the same time, it is a story about loneliness, fulfilling one's duty, as well as protecting the people one holds most dear, and how it is sometimes a responsibility one has to take alone.

== Characters ==
- Lu Mingfei

Voiced by: Daiki Yamashita

- Chen Motong
- Lu Mingze
- Chu Zihang
- Renata Chicherina
- Aki Sakatoku
- Mai Sakatoku
- Caesar Gattuso
- Norton
- Hilbert Ron Anjou
- Gen Chisei
- Erii Uesugi
- Jung Von Herzog
- Kogure Sakurai
- Gen Chime
- Akira Sakurai
- Ryoma Genishiro
- Yabuki Sakura
- Ryuji Saeki

== Plot ==
=== Dragon Raja I: The Blazing Dawn ===
Lu Mingfei (路明非), is an underachieving, socially awkward 18-year-old who is constantly being rejected by universities. When his hopes seem lost, he receives a strange acceptance letter and a scholarship from the mysterious Cassell College in the United States. While the letter is immediately dismissed as a scam, Mingfei soon learns that people in the college are determined to get him enrolled, forcing him to choose between his current life and the dubious academy.

Publicly embarrassed after a failed attempt to confess to his crush, he is rescued by Chen Motong (陈墨瞳) "Nono", a sophomore from Cassell College, who finally convinces him to enroll at the school.

Lu Mingfei soon learns from his professors that dragons are real, and the purpose of the university is to train dragon slayers. Just like the rest of the students, he is a hybrid, a human with dragon genes. Hybrids manifest special and unique supernatural abilities, but Mingfei seems like a regular human, with no abilities whatsoever. Regardless, he is inexplicably given an "S-Rank" status and declared "unprecedentedly talented" by the principal. To make matters worse, he keeps being visited by a strange boy in elaborate visions.

When a living dragon is found in the Three Gorges Dam, the students will be forced to defend their college from the dragon's followers and hunt the beast down.

=== Dragon Raja II: The Mourner's Eyes ===
During his first year's summer vacation, Lu Mingfei receives an invitation to a class reunion from his high school classmates that coincides with his birthday. In the meantime, an urgent mission from Cassell College has paired him with Chu Zihang (楚子航), a fellow student and one of the best combatants of the college. Regardless, the School appoints Lu Mingfei as main commissioner based entirely on his rank rather than his skills, forcing Chu Zihang to do all the work.

On their way back to the college, at the Chicago railway station, they meet a friendly girl named Xia Mi (夏弥) a freshman who intends to set up a tent at the park while she waits for the train. Zihang offers to pay for her hotel room instead and the three become friends.

While a mysterious series of accidents begin to occur, a plan to take control of Cassell is put into action by the powerful Gattuso family. Adding to his problems, Lu Mingfei learns of Nono's recent engagement to Caesar, the rebellious heir of the Gattusos, which sends him spiraling down into alcoholism. While the students must pick sides in the conflict and prove their loyalties, they must also keep an eye on the dragons lurking in the shadows.

=== Dragon Raja III: Black Moon Tide (I) ===
During Lu Mingfei's second summer break, a dragon heartbeat is discovered under the sea of Japan. To prevent the situation from developing into certain catastrophe, Hilbert Ron Anjou, the principal of Cassell College, appoints his three best students, Caesar Gattuso, Chu Zihang and Lu Mingfei as special agents to resolve the crisis.

The three receive a polite welcome from the Japanese branch, the Yamata no Orochi, leaders of the criminal underworld. Despite a few setbacks, both sides amicably cooperate to locate and destroy the embryo. The Cassell trio is sent on a submersible to the bottom of the Japanese Trench, where they find the ruins of the ancient lost city of Takamagahara.

The situation quickly turns dire, mutated creatures attack the submersible, an army of undead hybrids threatens to rise up to the surface and on top of that, the three are completely unaware of an intruder in the submarine.

=== Dragon Raja III: Black Moon Tide (II) ===
Ancient draconic remains have been awakened by the Cassell trio. After narrowly escaping from the dragons' attacks, Lu Mingfei, Chu Zihang and Caesar manage to reach the shore. Betrayed and abandoned by the Yamata no Orochi, and cut off from Cassell College, the three end up separated and lost in Tokyo.

The Yamata no Orochi starts a war against their sworn rivals, The Oni Clan, unleashing a wave of violence across all of Japan. The Cassell trio is forced to hide and work in a host club. Caesar readies his team for an assault against the Orochi and their leader Gen Chisei. But there is more than it seems to the conflict, Chisei's estranged brother Chime might hold the biggest clue to unveil its true nature. In the meantime, Lu Mingfei has made an unexpected friend, the secret weapon of the Orochi, a powerful girl with unstable blood.

=== Dragon Raja III: Black Moon Tide (III) ===
The war between the Orochi and the Oni continues to engulf Tokyo. Uesugi Erii (Japanese: 上杉絵梨衣), the living weapon of the Japanese branch, was designated as sacrifice to stop the whole crisis. The Cassell trio is against this decision, and quickly make a plan to take her out of the country. Meanwhile, the White Dragon King under the Sea of Japan has awakened, and Tokyo is submerged in a catastrophe.

=== Dragon King: World Reset ===
Lu Mingfei's fifth year in Cassell College has started, he was appointed as the new chairman of the Student Union, he gained popularity and now goes around the world hunting down fugitives for Cassell College.

Seemingly out of nowhere, Mingfei discovers that his senior and friend Chu Zihang has disappeared, in addition, no one in the world seems to remember his existence. Mingfei leaves Cassell to figure the situation out, just when a series of attacks to the College take place, making him the prime suspect and the most wanted man in the world. Mingfei has no choice but to reach out to Nono for help, who has dropped out of Cassell College.

== Release information ==
Volume	Title	Title in Chinese	Release date	ISBN
1	Dragon Raja I: The Blazing Dawn	龙族I 火之晨曦	April 1, 2010	978-7-80708-935-3
2	Dragon Raja II: The Mourner's Eyes	龙族II 悼亡者之瞳	May, 2011	978-7-5492-0430-4
3	Dragon Raja III: Black Moon Tide (I)	龙族III 黑月之潮（上）	December, 2012	978-7-5492-1646-8
4	Dragon Raja III: Black Moon Tide (II)	龙族III 黑月之潮（中）	July, 2013	978-7-5492-2063-2
5	Dragon Raja III: Black Moon Tide (III)	龙族III 黑月之潮（下）	December, 2013	978-7-5492-2322-0
6	Dragon Raja IV: Odin's Abyss	龙族IV 奥丁之渊	December, 2015	978-7-5492-3781-4
7	Dragon King: World Reset	龙王：世界的重启	September, 2022	Web Novel

== Video game ==
A massively multiplayer online role-playing game (MMORPG) for mobile devices, titled Dragon Raja, (龙族幻想, Lóngzú huànxiǎng, lit. Dragon Clan Fantasy) was developed by Loong Entertainment and released for iOS and Android. It launched in North America, South America and EMEA regions on February 27, 2020.

The game is powered by Unreal Engine 4 from Epic Games Besides traditional game features such as PvE and PvP fights, there are also various minigames such as cooking and sports as well as exploration elements.

=== Reception ===
Dragon Raja, then known as Project:SU, was revealed at Games Developer Conference (GDC) 2019. Even before the official launch, there were a number of mainstream gaming websites worldwide reporting about the game, such as IGN Poland, Pocket Gamer, and mein MMO Most of the reports praised the graphics. It also won the "Most Anticipated Game" award at Unreal Open Day 2019.

== Donghua ==
The novel was later adapted as Donghua series, firstly aired on Tencent Video in the mainland China on March 19, 2022 and in Japan in April 6th, 2024. A second season aired in China in 2025.
