= On Wings of Eagles (film) =

2016 Chinese-Hong Kong-American film by Stephen Shin

- Directed by: Stephen Shin; Michael Parker
- Written by: Rubby Xu; Christopher C. Chan; Stephen Shin; Michael Parker
- Produced by: Mark Bacino; Jim Green; Stephen Lam; Stephen Shin
- Starring: Joseph Fiennes; Shawn Dou
- Cinematography: Siu-Keung Cheng
- Edited by: Peter Svab
- Music by: Scott Greer
- Release date: 12 June 2016 (Hong Kong)
- Running time: 108 minutes
- Countries: United States; Hong Kong; China
- Languages: English; Mandarin; Japanese

On Wings of Eagles (also titled The Last Race) is a 2016 historical sports drama film directed by Stephen Shin and Michael Parker and starring Joseph Fiennes and Shawn Dou. An American-Hong Kong-Chinese co-production, the film is an unofficial sequel to Chariots of Fire (1981).

== Cast ==
- Joseph Fiennes as Eric Liddell
- Shawn Dou as Xu Niu
- Elizabeth Arends as Florence Liddell
- Richard Sanderson as Dr. Hubbard
- Jesse Kove as Hugh Johnson
- Augusta Xu-Holland as Catherine Standish
