= Novoland: The Castle in the Sky =

- Genre: Fantasy; Adventure; Romance
- Written by: Zhang Tan; Li Yujie; Yang Zhili; Ni Shanshan
- Directed by: Yang Lei; Chen Jialin; Lu Beike; Han Qing
- Starring: Zhang Ruoyun; Guan Xiaotong; Liu Chang; Ju Jingyi; Chen Ruoxuan
- Ending theme: "Big Dreamer" by TFBOYS
- Country of origin: China
- Original language: Mandarin
- No. of episodes: 28+1(Alternate Ending)

Production
- Producers: Fan Feifei; Fang Fang; Huang Xing
- Production location: China
- Production companies: Tencent Penguin Pictures; Shanghai Film Media Asia

Original release
- Network: Jiangsu Television
- Release: 20 July – 1 September 2016

Related
- Novoland: The Castle in the Sky 2

Novoland: The Castle in the Sky (Chinese: 九州·天空城; pinyin: Jiu Zhou Tian Kong Cheng) is a 2016 Chinese television series based on an original story created by Shanghai Film Media Asia and Tencent Penguin Pictures. Set in an ancient world (Novoland) where humanity is separated into several races, the series centers on the souring relations between the Humankind Tribe and the Wingkind Tribe. It aired on Jiangsu TV from 20 July to 1 September 2016.

The series has over 1.6 billion views by the end of its run. Guan Xiaotong won the Best Actress award at the Macau International Television Festival for her performance in the series.

== Synopsis ==
Long long ago, there lived two clans of humans - those who can fly and those who can't. The winged clan was considered more superior to the earth humans due to their flying ability and possession of flight technology. For centuries, earth humans and the winged humans battled for supremacy. After centuries of animosity, a fragile peace existed between these two clans in order to end all the deaths and losses both sides suffered during the wars.

What is the reason for the winged clan's ability to fly? It is the existence of a goddess who is reincarnated every 100 years. This goddess possesses the power to grant wings to the winged clan and the aura emitted from her powers all the flight technology. Envious of the winged clan's ability to fly, the queen of the earth humans started to plot for the re-incarnation of the goddess. The queen wished to have the reincarnated goddess under her control and to provide the power to fuel her grand plan for a sky kingdom in preparation for a war against the winged clan. As predicted, a baby girl was born and she was the reincarnation of the goddess. However, the queen missed her opportunity to kidnap the baby girl and the child grew up peacefully in anonymity, not knowing that she's the goddess reincarnate. To the humans and the winged clan, the goddess was born to grant the winged clan the ability to fly, but in reality the goddess is born every 100 years to reunite with her lover and even in this reincarnation, she was fated to meet and separate from him.

What is the fate of this pair of star-crossed lovers? Can they consummate their relationship in this reincarnation after so many centuries of missed opportunities and what of the impending war between the two clans?

== Cast ==
=== Main ===
- Zhang Ruoyun as Feng Tianyi

The King of Wingkind Tribe. Because of his superior family background, Tianyi is spoiled and overbearing, but he slowly changes due to love. He was born to a human mother, and therefore could not grow wings.

- Guan Xiaotong as Yi Fuling

The present reincarnation of Goddess of Shooting Stars Flower Fairy. She is innocent and kind. She would sacrifice herself for others, because she doesn't want to see others suffer.

- Liu Chang as Bai Tingjun

Crown Prince of the Humankind Tribe. He is Fuling's childhood friend and loves her deeply, but could not be together with her due to a curse placed on him by Fuling's father when he was young.

- Ju Jingyi as Xue Feishuang

Xue Clan's princess, and Tianyi's childhood friend. She is noble, elegant and beautiful, but becomes manipulative due to love.

- Chen Ruoxuan as Yu Huanzheng

Xue Feishuang's half-brother. A talented guy who is obsessed with traps and mechanisms.

=== Supporting ===
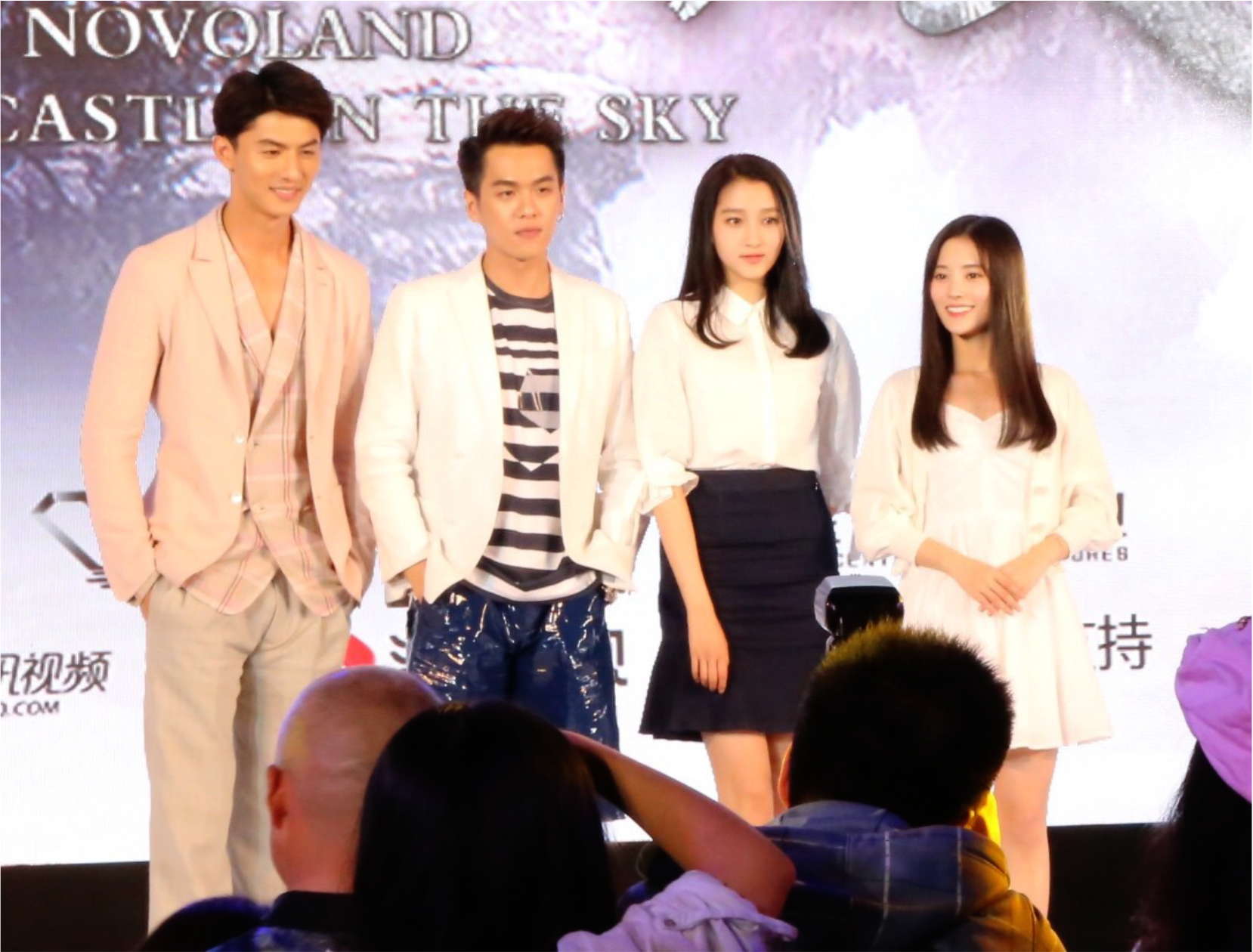
Cast of Novoland: Castle in the Sky in 2016 press conference.

==== Wingkind Tribe ====
- Zhang Luyi as Ji Shu

Wingkind Tribe's traps/mechanisms master. He loved Bai Xue, but had to leave her due to the differences in their race.

- Liu Junxiao as Xue Lin

Xue Feishuang's brother; an important minister of Wingkind Tribe. Using his position, he abuses his authority and power. He plans to assassinate Feng Tianyi and usurp the throne, but his plans were foiled.

- Jia Zhengyu as Xiang Congling

A member of Wingkind Tribe's Elite Team. He has a crush on Xue Feishuang.

- Wei Yankan as Yue Yunqi

A member of Wingkind Tribe's Elite Team. A loyal friend to both Feng Tianyi and Xue Feishuang.

- Zhao Jian as Feng Ren

Feng Tianyi's uncle. The regent of Wingkind Tribe.

- Zhou Yifan as Yu Tongmu

A member of Wingkind Tribe's Elite Team.

- Wang Siyao as Du Ruofei

A member of Wingkind Tribe's Elite Team.

- Dai Chao as Pei Yu

Guard of Feng Ren.

- Gao Feng as Xue Zhong, housekeeper of Xue family.
- Luo Youyue as Xue Qian
- Li Jing as Xue Su, officer.
- ??? as Qiu Ting, doctor of Wingkind Tribe .

==== Humankind Tribe ====
- Liu Min as Bai Xue

Queen of the Human Tribe, Bai Tingjun's mother. She loved Ji Shu deeply, and becomes vengeful after he left with her attendant, Rui Zhu.

- Zhu Shengyi as Bi Anhua

A female attendant who is in love with Bai Tingjun.

- Aliya as Xiong Tang

A capable and loyal warrior who serves Bai Xue.

- Yang Chengjin as Yi Qianji

Fuling's father. His actual identity is Ji Shu in disguise.

- Tang Jingmei as Lin Ruizhu

Fu Ling's mother. She was Bai Xue's attendant, but left with Ji Shu and married him. She was later killed by Bai Xue after giving birth to Fuling.

- Li Guo as Qi Luolin
- Wang Yujing as Fang Yeyan

Bai Tingjun's guard.

==== Stars Court ====
- Wen Jiang as Xing Guxuan

Elder of Stars Court; Ji Shu's teacher.

- Cui Peng as Xing Yinchi

Chief of Stars Court.

- Ma Qiguang as Xing Yufei

Instructor of Stars Court.

==== Heaven's Secret Door Descendents ====
- Han Qing as Tian Yazi

Tian Jizi's younger brother. He was removed from the sect due to practicing demonic arts. He becomes the Human Tribe's State Master after Bai Tingjun ascended the throne.

- Yan Junlin as Tian Jizi, Shuang City State Master
- Guo Peini as Gu Shenghua

==== Others ====
- Lin Jieni as Shao Wu

Goddess of Shooting Stars Flower Fairy. She loves Pian Yu.

- Ji Xiaobing as Pian Yu

Chief of the Human Tribe. He loves Shao Wu.

- Wang Jun as Da Jisi (Priest)
- Cheng Cheng as Xue Jin

== Soundtrack ==
Title	Singer	Composer	Lyricists	Notes
"Drunk Fei Shuang" (醉飞霜)	Ju Jingyi	Gao Weiran, Sun Pei	Ni Shanshan	Insert song
"Music Dream" (音夢)	Guan Xiaotong	Gao Weiran, Zhong Lei	Huang Xing	Insert song
"Big Dreamer" (大夢想家)	TFBOYS	Liu Jia	Wang Yunyun	Ending theme song

== Awards and nominations ==
Year	Award	Category	Nominee	Result	Ref.
2016	2016 ENAwards	Top 10 Online Dramas		Won	
2016	7th Macau International Television Festival	Best Actress	Guan Xiaotong	Won	
2017	22nd Huading Awards	Best Actress (Ancient)	Guan Xiaotong	Nominated	

== International broadcast ==
Country	Network	Airing dates
Malaysia	8TV	October 10, 2017 - on air (Monday to Friday 17:00)
Thailand	Channel 9 MCOT HD	November 4, 2017 - December 3, 2017 (Every Saturday and Sunday from 14.00 to 16.00.)
