= The Allure of Tears =

- Film poster
- Traditional Chinese: 傾城之淚
- Simplified Chinese: 倾城之泪
- Hanyu Pinyin: Qīngchéng Zhī Leì
- Directed by: Wong Chun-chun
- Written by: Lawrence Cheng; Wong Chun-chun; Silver Hau; Skipper Cheng
- Produced by: Lawrence Cheng; Daniel Feng; Guang Yuan Fu; Grace Song
- Starring: Zhou Dongyu; Aarif Rahman; Gigi Leung; Richie Jen; Joe Chen; Shawn Dou
- Cinematography: Yu Jing-pin
- Edited by: Wong Hei; Kwong Chi-leung
- Music by: Chiu Tsang-hei
- Production companies: Cayie Movie & Video Communication
- Distributed by: Fu Jian Heng ye Film Distribution
- Release date: 22 December 2011 (China)
- Running time: 111 minutes
- Country: China
- Language: Mandarin

The Allure of Tears (Chinese: 倾城之泪) is a 2011 Chinese romance drama film co-written and directed by Wong Chun-chun and starring Zhou Dongyu, Aarif Rahman, Gigi Leung, Richie Jen, Joe Chen, and Shawn Dou. The film consists of three love stories. The film premiered in China on December 22, 2011.

== Cast ==
- Zhou Dongyu as Geilimei, a patient with a blood cancer.
- Aarif Rahman as You Le, a brain cancer patient and Fuerdai.
- Gigi Leung as Yang Lin, a violinist.
- Richie Jen as Ding Dake, Yang Lin's boyfriend.
- Joe Chen as Zhang Cai, Chen Sheng's girlfriend.
- Shawn Dou as Chen Sheng, a white-collar.

== Release ==
The Allure of Tears was released on December 22, 2011, in mainland China, and on March 1, 2012, in Hong Kong.

== Reception ==
The film was accused of plagiarizing the plot of several Korean films and duplicating the poster concept of the 2005 South Korean film Sad Movie.
