= Youth Dinner =

- Movie Poster
- Simplified Chinese: 六人晚餐
- Directed by: Li Yuan
- Screenplay by: Mei Feng; Zhang Siyang
- Based on: Six People's Dinner by Lu Min
- Produced by: He Yubei
- Starring: Shawn Dou; Janine Chang; Wu Gang; Vivian Wu
- Production companies: Beijing Hongyue Jinxiao Entertainment; Beijing Shenghua Zhidian International Media; Dongyang Hongyue Jinxiao Entertainment
- Distributed by: Wuzhou Film Distribution; Huxia Film Distribution
- Release date: June 16, 2017
- Country: China
- Language: Mandarin

Youth Dinner is a 2017 Chinese youth romance film based on the novel Six People's Dinner by Lu Min. It stars Shawn Dou, Janine Chang, Wu Gang and Vivian Wu. The film was released in China on June 16, 2017.

== Synopsis ==
Set during the 1990s in Yunnan, the film revolves around two single-parent families and the love story between six individuals.

== Cast ==
- Shawn Dou
- Janine Chang
- Wu Gang (actor)
- Vivian Wu
- Zhao Lixin
- Yu Haoming
- Yin Xinzi
- Chen Jiang
- Cui Wenlu
- Chen Huan
- Hu Jingjun
- Chen Weixu
- Hao Xuankai
- Li Yunuo

== Awards ==
Year	Award	Category	Nominated work	Ref
2016	11th Festival Du Cinema Chinois De Paris	Jury Prize	Youth Dinner	
2016	11th Festival Du Cinema Chinois De Paris	Best Actor	Shawn Dou	
2016	11th Festival Du Cinema Chinois De Paris	Most Popular Actress	Vivian Wu	
