= Peng Guanying =

Chinese actor

- Born: February 18, 1986 (age 40); Changchun, Jilin, China
- Education: Beijing Film Academy
- Occupation: Actor
- Years active: 2010–present
- Agent: Sanren Media

Peng Guanying (Chinese: 彭冠英, born 18 February 1986) is a Chinese actor. He graduated from the Beijing Film Academy.

== Career ==
=== 2011–2015: Acting debut ===
In 2011, Peng made his acting debut in the drama Naked Marriage Era . He then made his commercial film debut in Time Flies Soundlessly in 2012, and received good reviews for his performance in the television series The Sweet Burden in 2013. Peng then starred in modern romance dramas Because Love is a Miracle and Because Love is Sunny produced by Hunan TV, which aired in 2013 and 2014 respectively.

=== 2016–present: Rising popularity ===
In 2016, Peng gained popularity for portraying the male lead in the historical romance drama Princess of Lanling King. In 2017, Peng featured in the fantasy epic drama Tribes and Empires: Storm of Prophecy as an ambitious and greedy prince.

In 2018, Peng was cast in the biopic drama Teresa Teng as the first love of the female lead. The same year he starred in the family drama Warm Jacket, portraying a single father.

In 2019, Peng gained attention for portraying the morally ambiguous male lead in the romance suspense drama The Controllers.

== Filmography ==
=== Film ===
Year	English title	Chinese title	Role	Notes
2009	Bloody Jade Curse	血玉咒	Wei Xiao	Web film
2009	Li Hua Cuo	梨花错	Pan Yinan	Web film
2012	Time Flies Soundlessly	岁月无声	Teacher Sha	
2012	True Love Compass	真爱指南针	Ma Yuan	Short film
2018	Dream Breaker	破梦游戏	Professor	Cameo

=== Television series ===
Year	English title	Chinese title	Role	Notes
2011	Naked Wedding	裸婚时代	Du Yi	
2012	Fu Chen	浮沉	Chen Chuan	
2012	The Fashion Editor	时尚女编辑	Xiao Wang	
2013	The Sweet Burden	小儿难养	Wu Di	
2013	I am Hao Congming	我叫郝聪明	Zhao Qichuan	
2013	Because Love is Sunny	因为爱情有多美	Ye Nandi	
2013	Woman Gang	女人帮	Wei Guangzheng	
2013	The Last Defence	正义的重量	Zhang Baojian	
2014	Because Love is a Miracle	因为爱情有奇迹	Qi Ji	
2016	Princess of Lan Ling King	兰陵王妃	Yuwen Yong	
2017	Tribes and Empires: Storm of Prophecy	九州·海上牧云记	Muyun Hege	
2018	Warm Jacket	小棉袄	Hua Chong	
2019	From Survivor to Healer	爱上你，治愈我	Chen Yifan	
2019	The Longest Day in Chang'an	长安十二时辰	Qin Zheng	Cameo
2019	Jue Jing Tao Jian	绝境铸剑	Chen Tianyou	
2020	To Dear Myself	亲爱的自己	Liu Yang	
TBA	The Controllers	掌中之物	Fu Shenxing	
TBA	Teresa Teng	邓丽君之我只在乎你	Zhou Taisheng	
TBA	Two Conjectures About Marriage	婚姻的两种猜想	Yang Zheng	

== Discography ==
Year	English title	Chinese title	Album	Notes
2013	"Happy Day "		The Sweet Burden OST	
2013	"Slowly It Will Heal"	慢慢会好的	Because Love is Sunny OST	
2013	"Bugs Fly"	虫儿飞	Because Love is Sunny OST	

== Awards and nominations ==
Year	Award	Category	Nominated work	Results	Ref.
2007	2nd Hua International Short Film Festival	Best Actor	Whirlpool	Won	
2017	24th Anniversary The Night of Beijing Award Ceremony	Breakthrough Actor	—N/a	Won	
