= Novoland: Eagle Flag =

- Genre: Fantasy; Historical fiction Adventure
- Based on: Novoland: Eagle Flag by Jiang Nan
- Written by: Jiang Nan; Chang Jiang
- Directed by: Zhang Xiaobo
- Starring: Liu Haoran; Song Zu'er; Chen Ruoxuan
- Composer: Peter Kam
- Country of origin: China
- Original language: Mandarin
- No. of seasons: 1
- No. of episodes: 56

Production
- Executive producer: Zhang Weiwei
- Production locations: Xiangyang; Xinjiang; Beijing
- Running time: 45 mins
- Production companies: Linmon Pictures; Linglong Media; Da Shenquan
- Budget: 500 million CNY

Original release
- Network: Zhejiang TV; Tencent; Youku
- Release: July 16, 2019

Novoland: Eagle Flag (Chinese: 九州·缥缈录; pinyin: Jiǔzhōu · Piǎomiǎo Lù) is a 2019 Chinese television series based on the novel of the same name by Jiang Nan, set in the fictional universe of Novoland. It airs on Zhejiang TV and online platforms Tencent and Youku from July 16, 2019.

== Synopsis ==
The series follows the rise of three young would-be heroes and their struggle against an evil warlord and swelling dark forces.

Lü Guichen is the Crown Prince of the nomadic Qingyang tribe, and is sent to Hetang Kingdom in Eastern Continent as hostage. He meets Ji Ye, an unfavoured illegitimate son who is training to become a warrior, and Yu Ran, the princess of the Winged tribe. The three become close friends, and the boys’ feelings for Yu Ran soon turn romantic.

At the same time, powerful warlord Ying Wuyi has been maintaining a firm control over the Emperor, giving him unprecedented power over the nobles. Lü Guichen, Ji Ye and Yu Ran decide to join the decisive battle against Ying Wuyi at Shangyang Pass, but unbeknownst to them, an even darker conspiracy is yet to unfold.

== Cast ==
=== Main ===
- Liu Haoran as Lü Guichen (Asule Pasu'er)
  - Crown Prince of the Qingyang tribe in the Northern Continent. Descendant of the Pasu'er family, who possesses the Qing Tong bloodline. He was weak and sickly as a child, and overlooked by his family and members of his tribe. Quiet and gentle in nature, he becomes determined to get stronger to protect his loved ones. He later became a warrior of an organization called Tianqi.
- Song Zu'er as Yu Ran
  - Princess of the Winged Tribe (羽族). She is bright and spirited in nature. Innately bold and curious, she has the quick wit and bravado to match.
- Chen Ruoxuan as Ji Ye
  - A skilled and fearless warrior, born the illegitimate son of a nobleman. Although harsh beginnings bear in him cold and ruthless tendencies, his hunger to prove himself betrays a childish vulnerability. He later became a warrior of Tianqi.

=== Supporting ===
==== Xiatang kingdom ====
- Zhang Jiayi as Baili Jinghong
  - Ruler of Xiatang kingdom. Ambitious and thirsty for power, he intends to use Lu Guichen as his tool in securing his reign.
- Jiang Shuying as Gong Yuyi
  - Member of the Winged Tribe. Royal advisor of Hetang kingdom. Yu Ran's aunt.
- Li Guangjie as Xi Yan
  - One of the Four Great Generals of the Eastern Continent (Fox general); a warrior of Tianqu. An incredibly gifted warrior and strategist, he hides his true agenda and thoughts behind a smiling, easygoing facade.
- Wang Ou as Su Shunqing
  - The adoptive mother of Baili Yin, who died along with him. Becomes a spirit (魅族). An assassin of Tian Luo sect. She has a complex relationship with Xi Yan.
- Liu Guancheng as Tuoba Shanyue
  - One of the Four Great Generals of the Eastern Continent (Leopard general). He originally came from the Northern Continent.
- Wei Qianxiang as Baili Ningqing - Head master of the Baili tribe. Bai Lingbo's lover.
- Wei Peng as Xi Yuan - Xi Yan's nephew. Lü Guichen and Ji Ye's friend.
- Huang Yi as Baili Yu - Son of Baili Jinghong. Lü Guichen's friend.
- Liu Qiushi as Baili Yin - Son of Baili Jinghong. He died from pulling the Shangyun Guxi sword
- Feng Hui as Ji Qianzheng - Ji Ye's father.
- Fan Jinwei as Ji Changye - Ji Ye's brother.
- Chen Zhiwei as Leiyun Zhengke - Member of Hetang's Army.

==== Yin Empire ====
- Xu Qing as Bai Lingbo
  - Grand princess of Yin Empire; aunt of Bai Luyan. Ambitious and vain, she thrives on manipulation and has a great thirst for power to cope with the struggles of aging and losing control.
- Xuan Yan as Bai Luyan - Emperor of Yin Empire.
- Chen Haoyu as Bai Zhouyue (Xiao Zhou) - Princess of Yin Empire.
- Ken Chang as Bai Yi
  - Head of the Four Great Generals of the Eastern Continent (Dragon general). A master of military strategy of Chu Wei kingdom (a vassal kingdom of Yin Empire), who is cold and melancholy.

==== Li kingdom ====
- Zhang Fengyi as Ying Wuyi
  - Ruler of Li kingdom. A powerful warlord who is incredibly accomplished and intelligent. His ambition is to overthrow the Emperor of Yin Empire and unite the Eastern Land.
- Wu Jiayi as Ying Yu - Princess of Li kingdom. Ying Wuyi's daughter.

==== Northern Continent ====
- Dong Yong as Lü Song (Guole'er Pasu'er) - Grand Ruler of Northern Land. Chief of Qingyang tribe. Lü Guichen's father.
- Tobgyal as Mengle Huo'er - Wolf Lord; Chief of Shuobei tribe. Grandfather of Lü Yingyang and Lü Guichen.
- Li Peilu as Lü Baoyin (Elu Pasu'er) - Prince of Qingyang tribe (Ninth prince). Lü Guichen's uncle.
- Li Ye as Lü Shouyu (Beimogan Pasu'er) - Lü Guichen's eldest brother.
- Yang Le as Lü Yingyang (Xuduohan Pasu'er) - Lü Guichen's third brother. A highly ambitious man.
- Jin Song as Longge Zhenhuang (Boluha Kusa'er)
  - Lü Guichen's foster father. Chief of Zhenyan tribe, which later revolts to fight against Qingyang and then becomes eliminated by Qingyang tribe.
- Yang Xinming as Da Hesa (Shahan Chaodelaji) - Sage of Qingyang, who is armed with knowledge of the world. Close and trusted friend of the Great Lord.
- Lu Yanqi as Longge Ning (Suma Kusa'er) - Daughter of Longge Zhenhuang. Lü Guichen's childhood servant and friend. She is born mute.

==== Others ====
- Zhang Zhijian as Lei Bicheng
  - A mysterious, powerful figure who lingers in the shadows and masterfully orchestrates the destruction and chaos of the Eastern Continent. Member of a denomination called Chenyue.
- Jiang Tao as Yi Tianzhan, member of the Winged Tribe. Heaven warrior. Ji Ye's teacher.
- Ji Ta as Bo Minke
- Jia Haitao as River Folk (河络). A prophet.

== Production ==
The series is produced by Linmon Pictures and directed by Zhang Xiaobo (To Be A Better Man). It is co-written by Jiang Nan, the author of the original novel; and Chang Jiang (The Advisors Alliance). Other notable cast members include producer Zhang Weiwei, who was also on the To Be A Better Man team; Yee Chung-man as costume designer; Peter Kam as music composer and Sun Li (Dragon) as art director. Han Lei (Kung Fu Panda), who graduated from the Texas A&M University and worked in Rhythm and Hues Studios and DreamWorks Animation, is in charge of the visual and special effects.

The series began filming at Xiangyang on November 2, 2017. The production team relocated to Xinjiang to film starting from February 7, 2018. Filming wrapped up on August 7, 2018.

== Soundtrack ==
No.	Title	Lyrics	Music	Singers	Length
1.	"Mo Ma (秣马)" (Theme song)	Liu Chang	Tan Xuan	Ayanga	5:13
2.	"Ending theme Zhenqing Zhenmei (真情真美) performed by Sun Nan and Valen Hsu"

== Reception ==
=== Ratings ===
- Highest ratings are marked in red, lowest ratings are marked in blue

Broadcast date	Episode	Zhejiang TV CSM59 ratings			Zhejiang TV CSM35 ratings		
Broadcast date	Episode	Ratings (%)	Audience share (%)	Rank	Ratings (%)	Audience share (%)	Rank
2019-07-16	1-2	0.72	4.78	2	0.801	4.98	1
2019-07-17	3-4	0.786	5.27	2	0.895	5.863	1
2019-07-18	5-6	1.043	6.91	1	1.158	7.396	1
2019-07-22	7-8	0.742	4.973	2	0.801	5.172	2
2019-07-23	9-10	0.879	5.634	2	0.951	5.828	2
2019-07-24	11-12	0.785	5.081	2	0.843	5.232	2
2019-07-25	13-14	1.057	6.834	1	1.16	7.172	1
2019-07-29	15-16	0.721	4.785	2	0.771	4.918	2
2019-07-30	17-18	0.796	5.245	2	0.883	5.543	2
2019-07-31	19-20	0.913	6.047	2	1.086	6.672	2
2019-08-01	21-22	1.115	7.530	1	1.248	8.033	1
2019-08-05	23-24	0.822	5.528	2	0.872	5.68	2
2019-08-06	25-26	1.015	6.707	2	1.098	6.975	2
2019-08-07	27-28	0.967	7.243	2	1.043	7.476	2
2019-08-08	29-30	1.195	8.337	1	1.299	8.684	1
2019-08-12	31-32	1.001	6.549	2	1.052	6.644	2
2019-08-13	33-34	1.030	6.831	1	1.101	7.048	1
2019-08-14	35-36	1.093	7.133	1	1.226	7.545	1
2019-08-15	37-38	0.938	6.141	1	0.99	6.238	1
2019-08-19	39-40	1.081	7.018	2	1.145	7.141	2
2019-08-20	41-42	1.032	6.789	2	1.108	6.96	2
2019-08-21	43-44	1.213	8.117	1	1.299	8.989	1
2019-08-22	45-46	1.162	8.382	1	1.218	8.393	1
2019-08-26	47-48	0.992	6.981	2	1.083	7.309	2
2019-08-27	49-50	1.055	7.083	2	1.146	7.376	2
2019-08-28	51-52	0.947	6.366	2	1.015	6.569	2
2019-08-29	53-54	0.903	6.272	1	0.981	6.518	1
2019-09-02	55-56	0.873	6.241	2	0.938	6.455	2

=== Awards and nominations ===
Award	Category	Nominated work	Result	Ref.
26th Huading Awards	Best Actress (Historical drama)	Song Zu'er	Won	
Golden Bud - The Fourth Network Film And Television Festival	Best Web Series	Novoland: Eagle Flag	Nominated	
Golden Bud - The Fourth Network Film And Television Festival	Best Actor	Liu Haoran	Nominated	
Golden Bud - The Fourth Network Film And Television Festival	Best Actor	Chen Ruoxuan	Nominated	
Golden Bud - The Fourth Network Film And Television Festival	Best Actress	Song Zu'er	Nominated	
Golden Bud - The Fourth Network Film And Television Festival	Best Actress	Jiang Shuying	Nominated	
Golden Bud - The Fourth Network Film And Television Festival	Best Actress	Wang Ou	Nominated	
26th Shanghai Television Festival	Best Cinematography	Li Peng	Nominated	
26th Shanghai Television Festival	Best Art Direction	Sun Li	Nominated	

== International broadcast ==
Country	Network(s)/Station(s)	Series premiere	Title
China	Zhejiang TV	July 16, 2019 – September 2, 2019 (Monday to Thursday 21:55-23:20 (two episodes simultaneous))	九州缥缈录 ( ; lit: )
China	Tencent Video	July 16, 2019 – September 2, 2019 (Monday to Thursday 22:00 VIP watch first and watch 6 more episodes, Non-VIP24:00 Synchronous Satellite TV Update)	九州缥缈录 ( ; lit: )
China	Youku	July 16, 2019 – September 2, 2019 (Monday to Thursday 22:00 VIP watch first and watch 6 more episodes, Non-VIP24:00 Synchronous Satellite TV Update)	九州缥缈录 ( ; lit: )
Singapore	Singtel TV e-Le	September 26, 2019 – December 26, 2019 (Monday to Thursday 21:00-22:00)	九州缥缈录 ( ; lit: )
Taiwan	MyVideo	July 19, 2019 (Two episodes updated from Friday to Monday at 24:00)	九州缥缈录 ( ; lit: )
Taiwan	LINE TV	July 19, 2019 (Two episodes updated from Friday to Monday at 24:00)	九州缥缈录 ( ; lit: )
Taiwan	KKTV	July 19, 2019 (Two episodes updated from Friday to Monday at 24:00)	九州缥缈录 ( ; lit: )
Taiwan	LiTV	July 19, 2019 (Two episodes updated from Friday to Monday at 24:00)	九州缥缈录 ( ; lit: )
Taiwan	世铨多媒体	July 19, 2019 (Two episodes updated from Friday to Monday at 24:00)	九州缥缈录 ( ; lit: )
Taiwan	Friday	July 19, 2019 (Two episodes updated from Friday to Monday at 24:00)	九州缥缈录 ( ; lit: )
Taiwan	CHT MOD	August 2, 2019 (Update 8 episodes every Friday, HamiVideo's listing time is the same)	九州缥缈录 ( ; lit: )
Taiwan	Eye TV	2019 ()	九州缥缈录 ( ; lit: )
Vietnam	HT Pictures	July 19, 2019 (Two episodes updated from Friday to Monday at 24:00)	九州缥缈录 ( ; lit: )
South Korea	Chunghwa TV	October 2019 ()	구주표묘록 (九州缥缈录; lit: )
Malaysia	Astro Quan Jia HD; Video on demand	July 25, 2019 (Two episodes updated every Thursday to Friday)	九州缥缈录 ( ; lit: )
Malaysia	Astro Quan Jia HD	September 17, 2019 (Monday to Friday 19:00-20:00)	九州缥缈录 ( ; lit: )
Singapore	Singtel TV; Singtel TV e-Le	September 26, 2019 (Monday to Thursday 21:00-22:00)	九州缥缈录 ( ; lit: )
Cambodia	PPCTV	2019 ()	(Novoland: Eagle Flag; lit: )
Thailand	Channel 9 MCOT HD (30)	December 19, 2020 - March 21, 2021 (Every Saturday and Sunday from 14.05 - 16.00)	แดนสนธยา: ธงพญาอินทรี ( ; lit: )
Indonesia	RTV	June 28, 2022 – present (Every Tuesday to Friday 22.00 - 23.00)	(Novoland: Eagle Flag; lit: )
