= Aliya (actress) =

Chinese actress of Mongolian ethnicity

- Born: May 10, 1992 (age 34); Inner Mongolia, China
- Education: Shanghai Theatre Academy
- Occupation: Actress
- Years active: 2013–present

Chinese name
- Traditional Chinese: 阿麗亞
- Simplified Chinese: 阿丽亚
Transcriptions

Aliya (Chinese: 阿丽亚; born 10 May 1992) is a Chinese actress of Mongolian ethnicity. She was educated at Shanghai Theatre Academy. Her first play was the television series The Spring of Gallows in 2013. She also played leading roles in the web dramas In Tale of Flower and Gamer's Generation, and is also known for her supporting role in the fantasy television series Novoland: The Castle in the Sky.

== Early life and education ==
Aliya was born in Inner Mongolia, China. In 2011, she enrolled as an undergraduate in Shanghai Theatre Academy, where she majored in acting. She worked part-time as a model.

== Filmography ==
Year	English title	Chinese title	Role	Notes
2013	The Spring of Gallows	绞刑架下的春天	Qian Tong	
2014	The Legend of Bubai Monk	布袋和尚新传	Xiao Ling	
2015	In Tale of Flower	超霸花神	Xiao Bao	
2015	Hearing·Love	听见·爱	Lu'er	
2016	War and Peace	大世界	Wan Ru	
2016	Still Begonia	海棠依旧	Da Changyuan	
2016	Novoland: The Castle in the Sky	九州天空城	Xiong Tang	
2016	Gamer's Generation	电竞纪元	Ming Zhen	
2017	Faithful to Buddha, Faithful to You	不负如来不负卿	Ye Xiaoxuan	
2018	Legend of Fuyao	扶摇	Tang Zhirong	
2019	Candle in the Tomb: The Wrath of Time	鬼吹灯之怒晴湘西	Hua Ling	
2020	Fairyland Lovers	蓬莱间	Ai Lin / Hai Tang	
2020	Antique Bureau Midgame	古董局中局之鉴墨寻瓷	Huang Yanyan	
2020	Silent Miss Gu	沉默不语的顾小姐		
2020	Insect Totem	虫图腾		
2023	Stand or Fall	闪耀的她	Lisa	

== Awards and nominations ==
Year	Award	Category	Nominated work	Result	Ref.
2020	7th The Actors of China Award Ceremony	Best Actress (Web series)	—N/a	Pending	
