= Lu Min (writer) =

Chinese fiction writer based in Nanjing (born 1973)

- 鲁敏
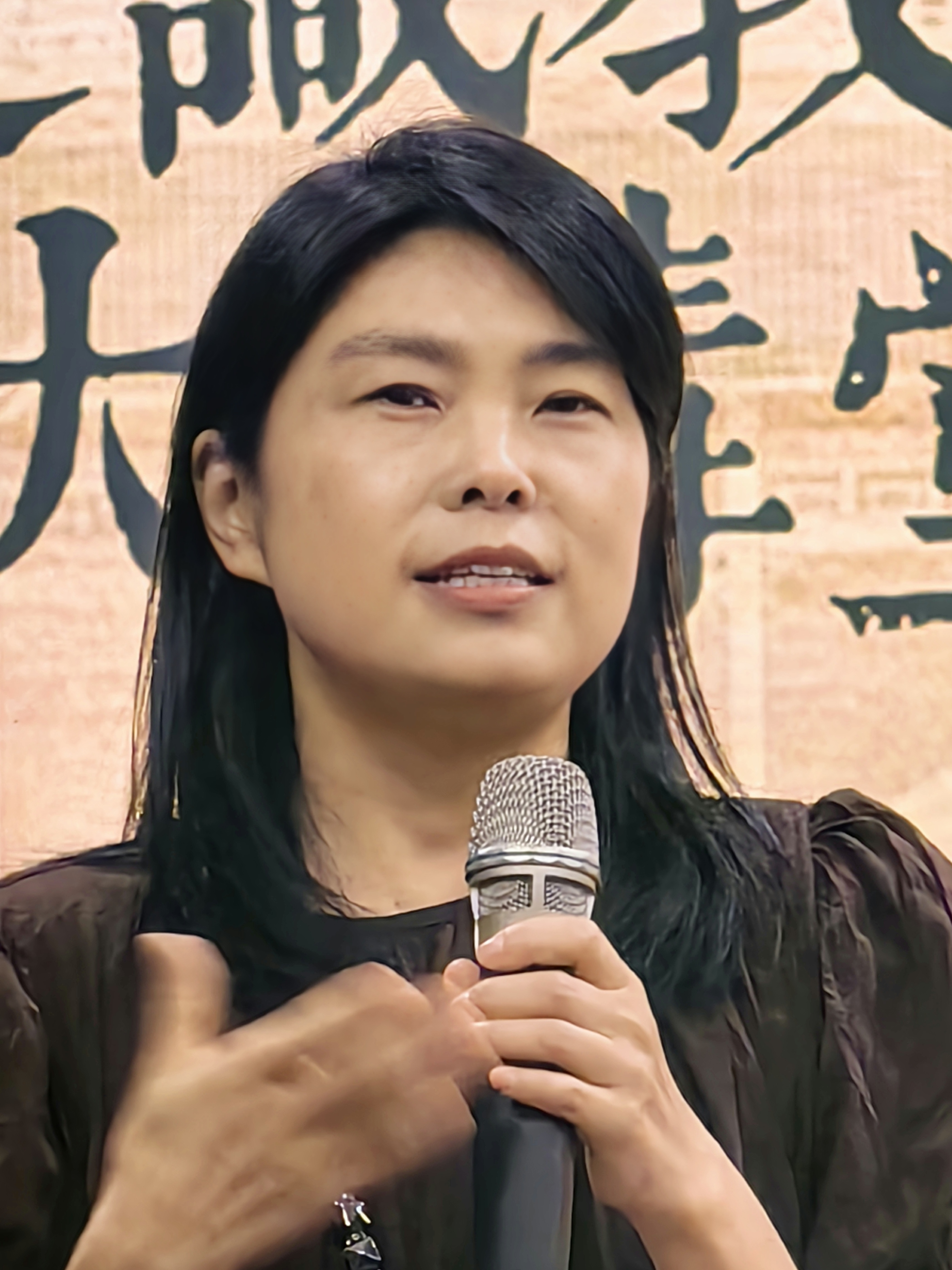
- Lu Min in October 2024
- Born: 1973 (age 52–53); Dongtai, Jiangsu, China
- Occupation: Novelist
- Writing career
- Language: Written Chinese
- Period: 1999–present
- Notable work: Dinner for Six (2012)

Lu Min (鲁敏, born 1973) is a Chinese fiction writer based in Nanjing. She won the 5th Lu Xun Literary Prize, among many other awards.

== Biography ==
Lu Min was born in Dongtai to a teacher mother and an engineer father. She worked as a post office clerk, a secretary, a company planner, a reporter and a civil servant before her writing career. While working in a post office in 1993, she attended novelist Su Tong who came in to purchase a stamp, and "felt the spirit of literature in his presence and was so affected that she thought of resigning immediately to go home and write".

Lu Min's 2012 novel Dinner for Six (六人晚餐) has been translated into English, German, Italian, Serbian, Spanish, Swedish and Turkish. The title of the novel was inspired by Van Gogh's painting The Potato Eaters. It has also been adapted into a film Youth Dinner (2017).

She was the featured author of the journal Chinese Literature Today in 2021.

In March 2024, Lu Min was invited to a 3-week long residency in the UK, hosted by the Confucius Institute at Oxford Brookes University. Her visit included events at the University of Leeds, the London Book Fair and the Oxford Literary Festival.

In May 2024, Lu Min was invited in Italy to present her translation into Italian language of Cena per sei (Dinner for six) at the Salone del libro in Turin. The visit included events at the Universities of Milan (Cattolica and Statale) and Rome (La Sapienza). The visit was hosted by the Confucius Institutes of Milan, Turin and Rome.

== Works translated to English ==
Year	Chinese title	Translated English title	Translator(s)
2010	此情无法投递	This Love Could Not Be Delivered	
2011	暗疾	"Hidden Diseases"	Annelise Finegan Wasmoen
2012	西天寺	"Paradise Temple"	Brendan O'Kane
2012	谢伯茂之死	"Xie Bomao R.I.P."	Helen Wang
2015	1980年的二胎	"A Second Pregnancy, 1980"	Helen Wang
2018	大宴	"The Banquet"	Michael Day
2018	徐记鸭往事	"The Past of Xu's Duck"	Jeremy Tiang
2019	风月剪	"Scissors, Shining"	Michael Day
2020	离歌	"Song of Parting"	Michael Day
2022	六人晚餐	"Dinner for Six"	Nicky Harman and Helen Wang
