= Urban Games =

- Theatrical poster
- Directed by: Bob Brown; Zhang Peng
- Starring: Shawn Dou; Michelle Chen
- Production company: China Film Group Corporation
- Release date: May 16, 2014 (China)
- Running time: 87 minutes
- Countries: China; United States
- Languages: Mandarin; English
- Box office: US$370,000

Urban Games (Chinese: 城市游戏) is a 2014 Chinese-United States action-thriller film directed by Bob Brown and Zhang Peng and starring Shawn Dou and Michelle Chen. The film was released on May 16, 2014.

== Cast ==
- Shawn Dou
- Michelle Chen
- Ashton Chen
- Ye Qing
- Cica Zhou
- Juno
- Robert Gilabert Cuenca
