= Shawn Dou =

Chinese Canadian actor

- 窦骁
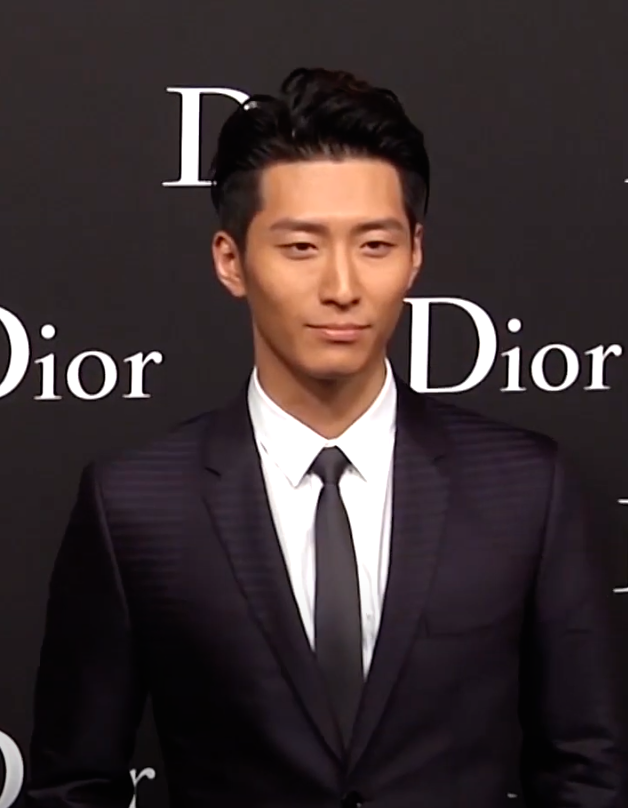
- Dou at Dior event in 2019
- Born: December 15, 1988 (age 37); Xi'an, Shaanxi, China
- Citizenship: Canadian
- Education: Beijing Film Academy
- Occupations: Actor, Martial Artist
- Years active: 2010–present
- Agent: Shawn Dou Studio
- Spouse: Laurinda Ho (m. 2023)

Chinese name
- Traditional Chinese: 竇驍
- Simplified Chinese: 窦骁
Transcriptions
Standard Mandarin
- Hanyu Pinyin: Dòu Xiāo

Shawn Dou (simplified Chinese: 窦骁; traditional Chinese: 竇驍; pinyin: Dòu Xiāo; born 15 December 1988) is a Chinese Canadian actor and martial artist best known for his role Laosan in film Under the Hawthorn Tree (2010) and Yan Xun in costume drama Princess Agents (2017). He is married to Laurinda Ho, daughter of Macau casino tycoon Stanley Ho.

== Life and education ==
Dou was born in Xi'an. His parents migrated to Canada when Dou was ten years old. Dou attended David Lloyd George Elementary School in Vancouver. There, Dou learned Karate and won the championship for two years consecutively. After graduating from DLG in 2001, he attended Sir Winston Churchill Secondary School in Vancouver, BC, and graduated from there in 2006. He returned to China and was accepted by the Beijing Film Academy in 2008. When Dou was in his second year of studies, he participated in the auditions for Under the Hawthorn Tree and was subsequently picked as the male lead.

In April 2019, Dou was reported dating with Laurinda Ho, daughter of Macau casino tycoon Stanley Ho. The couple married in Bali on 18 April 2023.

== Career ==
Dou rose to fame for his role in Zhang Yimou's film, Under the Hawthorn Tree (2010). He then starred in the romance drama film, The Seal of Love (2011), directed by Huo Jianqi. Dou starred in films of various genres, most notably, Wolf Totem (2015) and Youth Dinner (2017), which won him the Best Actor award at the 11th Festival Du Cinema Chinois De Paris.

Dou gained mainstream recognition for his role as the antagonistic prince Yan Xun in the highly popular costume drama, Princess Agents. Thereafter, he starred in the fantasy epic drama, Tribes and Empires: Storm of Prophecy.

In 2019, Dou starred in the romance dramas See You Again, alongside Tiffany Tang; as well as Ten Years Late. The same year, he co-starred in the action thriller Breakout: Sky Fire.

In 2020, Dou reunited with Tiffany Tang in the historical drama, The Legend of Xiao Chuo, portraying Han Derang. In 2022, Dou headlined the republican romance drama Love in Flames of War. From 2022 to 2024, Dou portrayed Dai Wei in TV series Ode to Joy season 3 to 5. In 2025, Dou starred in the costume suspense drama, Kill My Sins, alongside Liu Shishi.

== Filmography ==
=== Film ===
Year	English title	Chinese title	Role	Notes/Ref.
2010	Under the Hawthorn Tree	山楂樹之戀	Jian Xin (Laosan)	
2011	The Seal of Love	秋之白華	Qu Qiubai	
2011	Racing Legends	赛车传奇	Ye Haocheng	
2011	The Flowers of War	金陵十三釵	Soldier	Cameo
2011	The Allure of Tears	傾城之淚	Chen Yi	
2012	Nightfall	大追捕	young Wong Yuen-yeung	
2012	Dangerous Liaisons	危險關係	Dai Wenzhou	
2014	Urban Games	城市遊戲	Zhang Weibai	
2015	Wolf Totem	狼圖騰	Yang Ke	
2015	The Queens	我是女王	Ma Ke	
2015	To the Fore	破風	Qiu Tian	
2015	Time to Love	新步步驚心	14th Prince	
2015	Beautiful 2015	失眠笔记		Short film
2016	Everybody's Fine	一切都好	Guan Quan	
2016	The Last Race	终极胜利	Xu Niu	
2017	Youth Dinner	六人晚餐	Ding Chenggong	
2019	Skyfire	天火危情	Zheng Nan	
2024	A Legend	傳奇	Huo Qubing	
TBA	Saga of Light	日月	Houyi	

=== Television series ===
Year	English title	Chinese title	Role	Network	Notes/Ref.
2017	Princess Agents	楚乔传	Yan Xun	Hunan TV	
2017	Tribes and Empires: Storm of Prophecy	九州·海上牧云记	Muru Hanjiang	iQiyi, Tencent, Youku	
2019	From Survivor to Healer	爱上你治愈我	Yan Shuren	iQiyi, Tencent, Youku	
2019	See You Again	时间都知道	Ye Jiacheng	Beijing TV	
2019	Ten Years Late	十年三月三十日	Jin Ran	iQiyi, Tencent	
2020	The Legend of Xiao Chuo	燕云台	Han Derang	Tencent, BTV	
2021	New Generation: Bomb Disposal Expert	我们的新时代	Liu Xishi	Dragon TV, BTV	
2021	Tears in Heaven	海上繁花	Lei Yuzheng	iQiyi, Tencent, Youku	
2022	Love in Flames of War	良辰好景知几何	Xiao Beichen	Youku, Zhejiang TV	
2022	Ode to Joy 3	欢乐颂3	Dai Wei	Tencent Video, Dragon TV	
2023	Ode to Joy 4	欢乐颂4	Dai Wei	Tencent Video, CCTV	
2024	Ode to Joy 5	欢乐颂5	Dai Wei	Tencent Video, CCTV	
2025	Kill My Sins	掌心	Yuan Shaocheng	Youku	
2025	The Litchi Road	长安的荔枝	Lu Huan	Tencent Video, CCTV	
TBA	Chao Gan Mi Gong	超感迷宫	Zhuang Mingcheng	Tencent Video	
TBA	City of Burns	焰火明城	Shen Yan	iQiyi	
TBA	The Protagonist	主角	Liu Hongbing	Tencent Video, CCTV	

== Awards and nominations ==
Year	Award	Category	Nominated work	Results	Ref.
2010	Tencent Video Star Awards	Most Promising Film Actor	Under the Hawthorn Tree	Won	
2010	5th BQ Celebrity Score Awards	Film Newcomer of the Year	Under the Hawthorn Tree	Won	
2011	Sina Online Award Ceremony	Newcomer of the Year	Under the Hawthorn Tree	Won	
2011	China Screen Ranking	Newcomer of the Year	Under the Hawthorn Tree	Won	
2011	1st Harbin Film Festival	Most Commercially Valuable New Actor	Under the Hawthorn Tree	Won	
2011	14th Huabiao Awards	Outstanding New Actor (Overseas)	Under the Hawthorn Tree	Nominated	
2011	5th FIRST International Film Festival	Most Anticipated Newcomer	Under the Hawthorn Tree	Won	
2011	Grand Ceremony of New Forces	Most Popular Film Actor	Under the Hawthorn Tree	Won	
2011	Sohu Entertainment Award	New Face Award	—N/a	Won	
2011	Baidu Fudian Awards	Hottest New Actor	—N/a	Won	
2011	China Power Fashion Awards	Most Beautiful Dazzling Youth	—N/a	Won	
2011	6th BQ Celebrity Score Awards	Rising Actor	—N/a	Won	
2012	2nd China Film Director's Guild Awards	Best Actor	The Seal of Love	Nominated	
2012	12th Chinese Film Media Awards	Most Anticipated Actor	The Allure of Tears	Nominated	
2016	11th Festival Du Cinema Chinois De Paris	Best Actor	Youth Dinner	Won	
2019	Golden Bud - The Fourth Network Film And Television Festival	Best Actor	From Survivor to Healer, See You Again, Ten Years Late	Won	
