= Jiang Nan (novelist) =

Chinese novelist (born 1977)

- Born: Yang Zhi; July 13, 1977 (age 49); Shucheng County, Anhui, China
- Education: Peking University, Washington University in St. Louis
- Writing career
- Notable works: Novoland: Eagle Flag series, Dragon Raja series

Yang Zhi (Chinese: 杨治; born July 13, 1977), better known by the pen name Jiang Nan (Chinese: 江南), is a Chinese fantasy writer and novelist. He is the CEO of Beijing Smart Dragon Cultural Development Co, Ltd.

== Early life ==
Yang was born on 13 July 1977 in Shucheng County, Anhui, China. He studied chemistry at Peking University and at Washington University in St. Louis under Michael L. Gross.

His first novel was There They Were (Chinese: 此间的少年). He is one of the most popular writers with teenagers in China. His best known works are the Novoland: Eagle Flag (九州缥缈录) and Dragon Raja (龙族) series of novels.

== Published works ==
=== 2003 ===
- There They Were (此间的少年)
- Love's Till the End (爱死你, aka 一千零一夜之死神)

=== 2005 ===
- Novoland: Eagle Flag I : The Savage Land (九州缥缈录I：蛮荒)
- Novoland: Eagle Flag II : The Sword of Dragon Soul (九州缥缈率II: 苍云古齿)

=== 2007 ===
- Novoland: Eagle Flag III : The Champion of Novoland (九州缥缈录III：天下名将)
- Novoland: Eagle Flag IV : The Crusade of Lunar Sect (九州缥缈录IV：辰月之征)
- Butterfly's’ Storm (蝴蝶风暴I：猎犬狐)
- Emperor of Heaven：Hellfire (光明皇帝：业火)

=== 2009 ===
- The Agency (中间人)
- Cocoon (茧)
- Novoland: Eagle Flag V: The Alliance of Life (九州缥缈录V：一生之盟)
- Once Upon a Time in Shanghai (or Shanghai Fortress 上海堡垒)
- Fight for the Throne (涿鹿)

=== 2010 ===
- Novoland: Eagle Flag VI: Soul of Leopard (九州缥缈录VI：豹魂)
- Dragon Raja I: The Dawn Of Fire (龙族I：火之晨曦)
- Novoland: Assassin's Dynasty·KUI (九州·刺客王朝·葵)

=== 2011 ===
- Dragon Raja II: The Eye of Mourners (龙族II：悼亡者之瞳)

=== 2013 ===
- Dragon Raja III: The Dark Moon Tide (I) (龙族III: 黑月之潮（上）)
- Dragon Raja III: The Dark Moon Tide (II) (龙族III: 黑月之潮（中）)

=== 2014 ===
- Dragon Raja III: The Dark Moon Tide (III) (龙族III: 黑月之潮（下）)
- Flaming Heaven: The Return of the Dragon in Red (天之炽1：红龙的归来)

=== 2015 ===
- Dragon Raja IV: The Abyss of Odin (龙族IV：奥丁之渊)
- Flaming Heaven: Valkyrie (天之炽2：女武神)
- Flaming Heaven: Valkyrie (天之炽2：女武神II)

== Recognition ==
- First place in Chinese Writers Rich list in 2016 and 2013.
