= Siege in Fog =

- Promotional poster
- Genre: Romance; Melodrama
- Based on: Mi Lu Wei Cheng (迷雾围城) by Fei Wo Si Cun
- Written by: Jia Dongyan; Wu Yao
- Directed by: Hou Shu-pui
- Starring: Elvis Han; Sun Yi; Jeremy Jones Xu
- Country of origin: China
- Original language: Mandarin
- No. of episodes: 50

Production
- Running time: 45 minutes
- Production company: Wonderful Media
- Budget: ¥1.5 billion

Original release
- Network: Tencent
- Release: 2 March 2018

Related
- Too Late to Say I Love You

Siege in Fog (Chinese: 人生若如初相见) is a 2018 Chinese television series adapted from the novel Mi Lu Wei Cheng (Chinese: 迷雾围城) by Fei Wo Si Cun. It stars Elvis Han, Sun Yi and Jeremy Jones Xu in the leading roles. The series premieres on Tencent Video starting March 2, 2018.

== Synopsis ==
Yi Liankai, a flirtatious playboy from a wealthy family, falls in love at first sight with a pretty young maiden named Qin Sang. He, by all means possible, tries to force her hand in marriage, despite her harboring a crush on another man. Despite resenting him and rejecting all his advances and gestures of affection, Qin Sang agrees to marry Yi Liankai so that her father could recover his position as an officer. As they go through obstacles in times of war and chaos, Qin Sang slowly falls for Yi Liankai. However, things get complicated when her old flame returns to become her husband’s assistant.

== Cast ==
=== Main ===
Actor	Character	Introduction
Elvis Han	Yi Liankai	Third master of Yi family and disciple of Mr. Fan. He is a flirtatious playboy who becomes devoted after falling in love. He is seen as playful and unbridled, but is actually brave and astute. He enters the armed forces and becomes the commander of the coalition troops just to protect Qin Sang.
Sun Yi	Qin Sang	Daughter of a high-ranking official. She is cold, mysterious yet intelligent and resourceful. She loves Li Wangping but couldn't ignore her mother's will for her to marry Yi Liankai. She is unbothered by Yi Liankai's flirtatious ways, and is focused on her goal to make use of the Yi family to help her father.
Jeremy Jones Xu	Li Wangping / Pan Jianchi	A hot-blooded youth who is patriotic. He was Qin Sang's first love, but they separated when he was sent overseas to study at Japan's top military academy. After graduating with flying colors, Li Wangping returns to the country with a new identity as Pan Jianchi. He stayed by Yi Liankai's side and becomes his second-in-command in order to get close to Qin Sang. He becomes a cunning and manipulative man.

=== Supporting ===
==== Yi household ====
Actor	Character	Introduction
Alex Fong	Yi Jipei	Head of Yi household. Great Marshal of Yi army.
Ma Jinghan	Yi Lianyi	First young master. He appears to be a gentleman, but is actually scheming and would stop at nothing to get what he wants. He was outstanding and exemplary in his younger days but becomes crippled after falling into a trap laid by Yi Shoucheng.
Jin Feng	Murong Qian	Yi Lianyi's wife, Murong Chen's daughter and Murong Feng's elder sister. A conservative and traditional woman. She is greatly valued by Yi Jipei, and is in charge of all household matters of the Yi family.
Zou Tingwei	Yi Lianshen	Second young master. A man who possess both wits and brawn. Having been trained in the military since young, he wields substantial authority and power within the army. He is scheming and power-hungry, and plans to usurp the family's inheritance. Due to his resemblance with Yi Shoucheng, he was mistaken to be his son.
Zheng Luoqian	Fan Yanyun	Yi Lianshen's wife, daughter of Mr. Fan. She is forward-thinking and independent. Despite her marriage, she is in love with Yi Liankai, her childhood friend, and silently make sacrifices for him.
Nie Jiale	Yi Xiaorong	Fourth young miss. She is lively and innocent, and is doted on by Yi Jipei.

==== Warlord Faction ====
Actor	Character	Introduction
Hou Yong	Yi Shoucheng / Liang Xingbei	Yi Xupei's younger brother. Leader of Sky Alliance. In order to replace his brother's position in the army, he uses all sort of underhanded and manipulative ways to destroy the people around him.
Yu Bo	Li Chongnian	Warlord of Yizhou. An ambitious man who has secretly planned for years to topple the Yi army. He is cruel and merciless, and would sacrifice anything to achieve his goals.
Huang Wenhao	Murong Chen	Warlord of Chengdu. Yi Jipei’s sworn brother.
Chen Ruoxua	Murong Feng	Murong Chen's son. Young General of Chengdu.
Su Mao	Gao Peide	Yi Jipei’s loyal subordinate based in Changye. Provincial military governor.
Sun Chuinan	Gao Shaoxuan	Son of Gao Peide. He likes Qin Sang.
Hao Bojie	Furong Cai	Eldest disciple of Fan Zhiheng. Li Chongnian's aide.
Wen Jiang	Yao Jingren	A division commander loyal to Li Chongnian, and helps keep an eye on Liankai.
Li Jun	Zhang Xikun	Governor of Fuzhou. He is loyal to Yi Lianshen.
Hou Peijie	Jiang Jinyi	Governor of Fuzhou. He replaced Zhang Xikun in the post after Li Chongnian’s siege of Fuyuan.
Yue Yaoli	Fan Zhiheng	Yi Jipei’s aide and confidant. Yi Liankai and Furong Cai's teacher. Yanyun's father.
Guo Wei	Lieutenant Song	Yi Liankai’s first adjutant.
He Yihao	Lieutenant Xu	Yi Liankai's second adjutant. He replaced Song in the post after his death.

==== Cheng household ====
Actor	Character	Introduction
Gao Xiong	Old Scholar	The wealthiest man in town. Head of Cheng household.
Shu Yaxin	Cheng Yunzhi	Young master of the Cheng family. An arrogant and unscrupulous man. He is also the financial backer of the Yi family.
Lv Jiarong	Min Hongyu	Illegitimate daughter of the Cheng family. A famous courtesan who was sold to the brothel since young. She loves Yi Liankai and lets herself willingly be used by him.

==== Others ====
Actor	Character	Introduction
Zhao Liang	Qin Housheng	Head of Qin household. Qin Sang's father. A knowledgeable and humble man who does not yearn for fame nor power. He was removed from his government position after being framed by Furong Cai, and falls into a dire situation.
Hao Zejia	Deng Yulin	A patriotic and passionate young girl. After she is released by capture, she changes her name and becomes a lawyer. She is also Qin Sang's close friend and protector.
Maggie Shiu	Zhun Xiu	A former palace maid. Yi Xupei's bosom friend and confidante.
Liu Xinqi	Yao Yuping	Yao Jingren's daughter. Qin Sang's friend.
Cui Shaohan	Zhang Linzhi	Zhang Xikun's son.
Zhou Xiaofei	Mother Zhu	Qin Sang's personal attendant.
Zhang Xuejun	Shi Busuan	A fortune teller.

== Production ==
The series was filmed between March and June 2016 at Hengdian World Studios.

== Soundtrack ==
Siege in Fog - Original Television Soundtrack (人生若如初相见电视剧原声音乐大碟)
No.	Title	Music	Length
1.	"Burning City Snow (焚城雪)" (Opening Theme song)	Henry Huo
2.	"If Life Was Like How We First Met (人生若只如初相见)" (Insert song)	Jin Chi
3.	"Lock You, Lock Heart (锁你锁心)" (Insert song)	Sun Bolun
4.	"First Love, First Encounter (初恋初见)" (Qin Sang's theme song)	Sun Yi
5.	"Women's Heart (女人心)" (Insert song)	Zheng Luoqian
6.	"Speechless (无言)" (Insert song)	Chen Weiqi
7.	"Song of Intoxication (醉狂歌)" (Ending Theme song)	Zou Tingwei

== Reception ==
=== Controversy ===
Fei Wo Si Cun, the screenwriter of the drama and the author of the original novel, sued Wonderful Media for breach of a 5-year contract that ended in March 2016. She claims that the producers continued to work on the project without payment. Wonderful Media responded that a substantial investment was already made in December and for the author to suddenly demand an extravagant sum was unfair and unwarranted.

== International broadcast ==
- Malaysia - 8TV (Malaysia): 14 May 2018 – 20 July 2018, Monday to Friday, 8:30 pm to 9:30 pm.
