= Wallace Chung =

Hong Kong actor and singer

- 鍾漢良
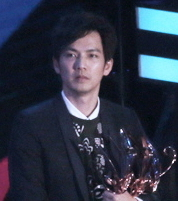
- Chung in 2016
- Born: Chung Hon-leung; 30 November 1974 (age 51); Hong Kong
- Occupations: Actor; singer; record producer
- Years active: 1993–present
- Agents: TVB (1993–1995) Hairun Media (2012–2015); Shanghai Cornucopia Television Culture Media (present)
- Musical career
- Genres: Mandopop
- Labels: Music Impact (1995–1998); Rock Records (2000–2005); Cornucopia Music (2006–present)

Chinese name
- Traditional Chinese: 鍾漢良
- Simplified Chinese: 钟汉良
Transcriptions
Standard Mandarin
- Hanyu Pinyin: Zhong Hànliáng
Yue: Cantonese
- Jyutping: Zung1 Hon3 Loeng4
- Website: wallacechung.cc

Wallace Chung Hon-leung (Chinese: 鍾漢良; born 30 November 1974) is a Hong Kong actor and singer, best known for his work on several Chinese television dramas.

Chung ranked 68th on Forbes China Celebrity 100 list in 2013, 94th in 2014, 45th in 2015, 31st in 2017.

== Career ==
=== 1993–1998: Beginnings and rise to fame ===
His debut was in the 1993 Hong Kong TVB biographical television drama The Chord to Victory, portraying Kenny Bee, a member of The Wynners, after joining the network as a dancer. He rejected the offer to sign a 5-year contract due to the length of the contract and eventually left. In 1995, Chung moved to Taiwan to pursue a singing career under the guidance of record producer Samuel Tai, subsequently signing a contract with Music Impact.

Chung's successful debut with his 1995 dance album OREA dubbed him as Taiwan's "Little Sun." The eponymous title song quickly raced to No. 1, topping the charts for many weeks. In December 1995, Chung released his second album, By Your Side, which earned him a title as Taiwan's Best Idol for two years in the row. Chung achieved further fame in mainland China through the television series Imminent Crisis, making him the only actor from Hong Kong to be nominated at the China TV Golden Eagle Award. He gained mainstream popularity in 2015 with the hit romance drama My Sunshine, and won the Asia Grand Star Award at the Seoul International Drama Awards.

In 1995, Chung was recommended by Taiwanese music producers, and signed on with the record company Music Impact. That July, he debuted as a singer with his first solo album, OREA. The eponymous title song quickly raced to No. 1, topping the charts for many weeks. In December, he released his second album, By Your Side. With his successful debut and entry into the entertainment industry, the Taiwanese media dubbed him as Taiwan's "Little Sun".

In July 1996, he made his film debut in Hi Sir. Chung also contributed to the soundtrack of the film, singing the theme song "Ai Bu Shi Shou". Hi Sir topped box office charts and became the biggest summer hit of 1996. In October, he released his first Cantonese album titled Present, officially embarking onto the Hong Kong music industry.

In October 1998, Chung released his sixth album, Hello, How Are You. The title song "Subway" was nominated at the Golden Melody Awards for Best Composition. Chung also received praise for penning the lyrics to most of his songs, including "Really Like Me", "Us" and "I Really Want to Know".

=== 1999–2009: Focus on acting ===
From 1999 onwards, Chung moved to the Mainland to focus on his acting career. The same year, he played his first television leading role in wuxia drama Windstorm. In 2001, Chung had a guest role in the pan-Asia hit drama Meteor Garden.

Chung resumed his singing career in 2004. He published his seventh Mandarin-language album, Soul Man. The album received positive reviews from music critics.

Chung first gained recognition for his portrayal of two Qing-dynasty figures. In 2006, Chung starred in Secret History of Kangxi, portraying a famous Chinese poet Nalan Xingde. In 2008, Chung starred in Royal Tramp, portraying Kangxi Emperor.

In 2009, Chung starred in King of Shanghai. He was nominated for the Most Popular Actor award at the Shanghai Television Festival.

=== 2011–2014: Rising popularity ===
In 2010, Chung starred in the romance melodrama Too Late to Say Loving You, portraying Mu Rongfeng. The drama earned a cult following among mainland audiences, and Chung gained popularity in mainland China, especially among female audiences.

In January 2010, Chung released his eleventh Mandarin album, All Eyes On Me. Upon its release in mainland China in October, the album topped the charts and Chung won the Best Male Stage Performance at the Beijing Pop Music Awards. Chung once again won the award in 2011, with his single "One Day We Will Grow Old". The song was also named as one of the Top 10 songs of the year. In October 2011, he held his first solo concert titled "Wallace S-Party Concert" at Shanghai's Luwan Gymnasium.

In 2012, he starred in the spy drama Imminent Crisis. Chung's performance earned him acclaim, and he was nominated the Audience's Favorite TV Drama Actor in the Hong Kong and Taiwan region at the 26th China TV Golden Eagle Award and the Most Popular Actor at the 9th China Golden Eagle TV Art Festival. He won the Audience's Favorite TV Drama Actor in the Hong Kong and Taiwan region, becoming the first actor from Hong Kong and Taiwan region to win such a national TV award.

Chung was once again nominated for the award the subsequent year with his performance in the wuxia drama The Magic Blade (2012), adapted from Gu Long's novel of the same title. Chung was also awarded the Best Actor award at the 3rd LeTV awards for his performance.

In 2013, Chung starred in the romance drama Best Time, based on Tong Hua's novel The Most Beautiful Time. The series was a ratings hit, leading to increased popularity for Chung. Chung was awarded the Best Actor award for the Hong Kong and Taiwan region at the 4th LeTV awards. The same year, he starred in the wuxia drama The Demi-Gods and Semi-Devils, adapted from Louis Cha's novel Demi-Gods and Semi-Devils. He then starred in crime thriller film Drug War, directed by Johnnie To.

In 2014, Chung played dual roles in the drama The Stand-In, adapted from the film Bodyguards and Assassins. The series was nominated for the Outstanding Television Series award at the Flying Apsaras Awards. He also starred alongside Feng Shaofeng and Chen Bolin in the road trip comedy film The Continent, directed by Han Han.

=== 2015–present: Mainstream popularity ===
In 2015, Chung starred in the romance melodrama in My Sunshine, based on the novel Silent Separation written by Gu Man. The series was a major hit, and propelled Chung to mainstream popularity in China. Chung received the Asia Star Grand Award at the 2015 Seoul International Drama Awards. The same year, he announced his directorial debut, Sandglass, a youth movie adapted from best-selling author Rao Xueman's book by the same name.

In December 2015, Chung released a new album titled Sing For Life, and announced his Sing For Life World Tour. The tour began in Shanghai on 20 February 2016, and subsequently traveled to Guangzhou, Shenzhen and Beijing.

In 2016, Chung starred in the action comedy film Bounty Hunters, directed by Shin Terra, alongside Tiffany Tang and Korean actor Lee Min-ho. The same year, he starred in the crime thriller Tik Tok. Chung then played the antagonist in crime drama film Three, which also stars Zhao Wei and Louis Koo. He won the Most Anticipated Actor award at the 19th China Movie Channel Media Award.

In 2017, Chung starred in the historical romance drama General and I, adapted from the novel A Lonesome Fragrance Waiting to be Appreciated, alongside Angelababy.

In 2018, Chung starred in the modern romance drama Memories of Love alongside Jiang Shuying, and romance melodrama All Out of Love with Sun Yi and Ma Tianyu.

In 2019, Chung was cast in the war film Liberation directed by Li Shaohong, and romance film Adoring.

In 2020, Chung starred in historical romance drama The Sword and the Brocade alongside actress Tan Songyun.

In 2022, Chung starred in the modern romance drama Because of Love alongside Li Xiaoran.

== Filmography ==
=== Film ===
Year	English title	Chinese title	Role	Notes	Ref.
1996	Hi Sir	超級班長	Dong Zhenwu	aka Squad Leader	
1997	Love Is Not a Game But a Joke	飛一般愛情小說	Leslie	aka Sweet Symphony	
1997	Fight or Die	英雄向後轉	Lin Zongguan		
1998	Another	別戀	Zhou Han		
1998	Bad Girl Trilogy	惡女列傳	Liang	Segment: Cat and Mouse	
2000	Forever Young	今生有約			
2008	Duel for Love	鬥愛	Chu Sinan		
2009	Evening of Roses	夜玫瑰	Ke Zhihong	Digital film	
2009	Huo Xian Zhui Xiong	火線追兇	Detective Zhong Lang		
2012	Secret Garden	秘密花園	Jin Zhuyuan		
2013	To Love God	愛神來了	Si Song		
2013	Drug War	毒戰	Guo Weijun		
2014	The Continent	后會無期	A Lv		
2014	Girls	閨蜜	Lin Jie		
2014	Meet Miss Anxiety	我的早更女友	Liu Chong		
2015	Monster Hunt	捉妖记	Ge Qianhu	Special appearance	
2016	Three	三人行	Cheung Lai-shun		
2016	Bounty Hunters	賞金獵人	Wang Boyou		
2016	Tik Tok	惊天大逆转	Guo Zhiyong / Guo Zhihua		
2016	The Wasted Times	罗曼蒂克消亡史	Dance instructor	Cameo	
2019	Liberation	解放了	Yao Ji		
2019	Adoring	宠爱	Li Xiang		

=== Television series ===
Year	English title	Chinese title	Role	Notes	Ref.
1993	The Chord to Victory	少年五虎	Kenny Bee		
1993	Mind Our Own Business	開心華之里	Siu Kwong-wai		
1994	Conscience	第三類法庭	Cham Wang-leung		
1994	Journey of Love	親恩情未了	Cheung Ka-keung		
1995	Detective Investigation Files	刑事偵緝檔案	Lam Yan-chi		
1999	Windstorm	白手風雲	Chu Yun		
2000	Sweetheart	上錯樓梯睡錯床	Hsu Kuo-tai		
2001	Feng Chen Hu Die	風塵舞蝶	Bao Wangchun		
2001	Meteor Garden	流星花園	Song	Episodes 21–22	
2001	Qian Si Wan Lu	千絲萬縷	Han Yuntian		
2002	Secretly in love with you	偷偷愛上你	Chiang Cheng-fei		
2002	The Four Detective Guards	四大名捕会京师	Chaser		
2003	Hi! Working Girl	Hi！上班女郎	Johnny	Episodes 5–8	
2004	Treacherous Waters	逆水寒	Gu Xizhao		
2004	Mo Jie Zhi Long Zhu	魔界之龙珠	Lu Yi		
2005	The Midnight Sun	午夜陽光	Yu Youhe		
2006	Secret History of Kangxi	康熙秘史	Nalan Xingde		
2007	The Patriotic Knights	俠骨丹心	Li Nanxing		
2007	Rose Martial World	玫瑰江湖	Mu Sheng		
2008	Royal Tramp	鹿鼎記	Kangxi Emperor		
2009	Undercover	內線	Liang Dongge		
2009	Let's Dance	不如跳舞	Luo Peng		
2009	Too Late to Say Loving You	來不及說我愛你	Murong Feng		
2009	King of Shanghai	上海王	Yu Qiyang (A'qi)		
2010	No Choice	別無選擇	Qi Tianbai		
2010	Under the Bodhi Tree	菩提樹下	Guan Houpu		
2011	Imminent Crisis	一觸即發	Yang Muchu / Yang Muci		
2012	The Magic Blade	天涯明月刀	Fu Hongxue		
2013	Best Time	最美的時光	Elliott Lu		
2013	The Demi-Gods and Semi-Devils	天龍八部	Qiao Feng / Xiao Feng		
2014	The Stand-in	十月圍城	Li Chongguang/Wang Asi		
2014	The City of Warriors	勇士之城	He Pingan		
2015	My Sunshine	何以笙簫默	He Yichen		
2017	General and I	孤芳不自賞	Chu Beijie		
2018	Memories of Love	一路繁花相送	Lu Fei	Also known as The Flower Road to Bid Farewell	
2018	All Out of Love	凉生，我们可不可以不忧伤	Cheng Tianyou		
2021	The Sword and The Brocade	锦心似玉	Xu Lingyi		
2022	Because of Love	今生有你	Nie Yusheng		
2025	The Legend of Zang Hai	藏海传	Kuai Duo		
2025	Second Chance Romance	亦舞之城	Feng Rui		
2026	The Epoch of Miyu	蜜语纪	Ji Feng		
TBA	Healing Love	幸福的理由	Fang Haosheng		
TBA	The Emperor's Love	倾城亦清欢	Zhan Qingcheng		

=== Variety show ===
Year	English title	Chinese title	Role	Ref.
1994	K-100		Host	
2005	Super Girl	超級女聲	Judge	
2006	Dancing with Stars	舞林大會	Contestant	
2014	The Amazing Race China	極速前進（第一季）	Contestant	
2015	Back to High School	我去上學啦（第一季）	Host	
2019		′漫游记'' 第一季	Host	
2020	Street Dance of China – Super X	這!就是街舞（第三季）	Judge (4. Captain)	
2021	Summer Youth	夏日少年派（第一季）	Host	
2021	Journey of Warriors	勇敢者的征程	Co-Host	

== Discography ==
=== Albums ===
Year	English title	Chinese title	Language	Type
1995	OREA		Mandarin	Studio album
1995	By Your Side	在你身邊	Mandarin	Studio album
1996	Miracle	奇蹟	Mandarin	Studio album
1996	Present	一千種不放心 / 禮物	Cantonese	Studio album
1997	Passionate	親熱	Mandarin	Studio album
1997	Zi Lian Wu Xing Ji	自戀舞星級	Mandarin; Cantonese	Compilation album
1998	Do You Love Him?	妳愛他嗎?	Mandarin	Studio album
1998	Hello, How Are You?	鍾情二次方	Mandarin	Studio album
2000	Most Exciting	最是精彩	Mandarin	Best album
2004	Soul Man	流向巴黎	Mandarin	Studio album
2010	All Eyes On Me	視覺動物	Mandarin	Studio album
2015	Sing For Life	乐作人生	Mandarin	Extended play

=== Singles ===
Year	English title	Chinese title	Album	Notes
2003	"On Fire"	著火	Feng Chen Hu Die OST	
2003	"White Jasmine"	白色茉莉花	Feng Chen Hu Die OST	
2006	"A Million Screams"	一萬次呼喊	Secret History of Kangxi OST	
2006	"Fine Day"	風和日麗	—N/a	
2007	"Reason to be Happy"	幸福的理由	—N/a	
2011	"One Day We Will Grow Old"	有一天我们都会老	—N/a	
2011	"The Magic Blade"	天涯明月刀	The Magic Blade OST	
2013	"To Love God"	愛神	To Love God OST	
2013	"Tian Xia Zhi Feng"	天下之風	—N/a	
2014	"Gu Lang Xiang"	故鄉香	The Stand-In OST	
2014	"Zhong Guo Shan"	中國山	The Stand-In OST	
2015	"What Is Love"	何以愛情	My Sunshine OST	
2015	"Ordinary Person"	普通人	Hollywood Adventures OST	
2015	"Qi Shu"	奇书	Monster Hunt OST	
2017	"A Lonesome Fragrance"	一支孤芳	General and I OST	
2018	"Love that is Not Sad"	不忧伤的爱	All Out of Love OST	
2019	"Adoring"	宠爱	Adoring OST	
2021	"Fallen Ink"	落墨	The Sword and the Brocade Ending Theme Song	

== Awards and nominations ==
=== Film and television ===
Year	Award	Category	Nominated work	Result	Ref.
2009	15th Shanghai Television Festival	Most Popular Actor	King of Shanghai	Nominated	
2010	14th China Music Awards	Best TV Actor Award (Hong Kong/Taiwan)	King of Shanghai	Nominated	
2010	14th China Music Awards	Best Trend-Setting Actor	King of Shanghai	Won	
2011	15th China Music Awards	Best TV Actor Award (Hong Kong/Taiwan)	Too Late to Say Loving You	Nominated	
2011	3rd China TV Drama Awards	Most Popular Couple (with Li Xiaoran)	Too Late to Say Loving You	Won	
2012	26th China TV Golden Eagle Award	Audience's Choice for Actor	Imminent Crisis	Nominated	
2012	9th China Golden Eagle TV Art Festival	Most Popular Actor	Imminent Crisis	Nominated	
2012	9th China Golden Eagle TV Art Festival	Audience's Favorite TV Drama Actor (Hong Kong/Taiwan)	Imminent Crisis	Won	
2012	4th China TV Drama Awards	Most Appealing Actor	—N/a	Won	
2012	4th China TV Drama Awards	Most Popular All-Rounded Artist	—N/a	Won	
2013	5th China TV Drama Awards	Influential Figure of the Year	—N/a	Won	
2013	5th China TV Drama Awards	Most Popular Actor (Hong Kong/Taiwan)	Best Time	Won	
2014	6th China TV Drama Awards	Television Figure of the Year	The Stand-In	Won	
2014	6th China TV Drama Awards	Media Recommended Actor	—N/a	Won	
2014	10th China Golden Eagle TV Art Festival	Audience's Favorite TV Drama Actor (Hong Kong/Taiwan)	The Magic Blade	Nominated	
2015	10th Seoul International Drama Awards	Asia Grand Star Award	My Sunshine, The Stand-in	Won	
2016	19th Shanghai International Film Festival	Best Actor	Three	Won	
2016	12th Guangzhou Student Film Festival	Most Popular Actor	Three	Won	
2019	12th Best 10 China TV Awards	Best 10 Actors	—N/a	Won	
2022	Seoul International Drama Awards	People's Choice: Popular Actor Award	Because of Love	Won	

=== Music ===
Year	Award	Category	Nominated work	Result	Ref.
2011	18th Beijing Pop Music Awards	Best Male Stage Performance	—N/a	Won	
2011	Music Radio China Top Chart Awards	Most Popular Male Singer (Hong Kong/Taiwan)	—N/a	Won	
2011	11th China Original Song Award	Best Male Stage Performance	—N/a	Won	
2011	11th China Original Song Award	Most Popular Male Singer (Hong Kong/Taiwan)	—N/a	Won	
2011	9+2 Music Pioneer Awards	All-Rounded Artist of the Year	—N/a	Won	
2011	9+2 Music Pioneer Awards	Most Popular Singer	—N/a	Won	
2011	9+2 Music Pioneer Awards	Most Popular Song	"One Day We Will Grow Old"	Won	
2012	19th Beijing Pop Music Awards	Best Male Stage Performance	—N/a	Won	
2012	19th Beijing Pop Music Awards	Songs of the Year	"One Day We Will Grow Old"	Won	
2014	1st China Top Hits Awards	Best All-Rounded Artist	"Tian Xia Zhi Feng"	Won	
2014	1st China Top Hits Awards	Best Male Stage Performance	"To Love God"	Won	
2014	1st China Top Hits Awards	Top 10 Songs	"Zhong Guo Shan"	Won	
2015	Top Chinese Music Awards	Most Popular Television OST	"Zhong Guo Shan"	Won	
2016	Top Chinese Music Awards	Most Popular Album	Sing For Life	Won	
2016	Top Chinese Music Awards	Most Popular Song	"Sing For Life"	Won	
2016	Top Chinese Music Awards	Most Popular Television OST	"He Yi Ai Qing"	Won	
