= Shiyue Weicheng =

Shiyue Weicheng may refer to:

- Bodyguards and Assassins, a 2009 Hong Kong film
- The Stand-In (TV series), a 2014 Chinese TV series
