= My Original Dream =

- Poster
- Chinese: 我的青春期
- Directed by: Hao Jie
- Written by: Hao Jie
- Starring: Bao Bei'er; Sun Yi
- Edited by: Zhu Lin
- Production companies: Guangguner (Beijing) Media Development; Wanda Media 浙江光棍儿影视文化有限公司; Bei Jing Ying Xing Tian Xia Culture Communication; Wanda Pictures (Qingdao)
- Distributed by: Wuzhou Film Distribution; Huaxia Film Distribution; Wanda Media
- Release date: 11 November 2015 (China)
- Running time: 91 minutes
- Country: China
- Language: Mandarin
- Box office: CN¥12.2 million

My Original Dream (Chinese: 我的青春期) is a 2015 Chinese romantic comedy-drama film directed by Hao Jie. It was released on 11 November 2015.

== Cast ==
- Bao Bei'er
- Sun Yi
- Feng Si

== Reception ==
The film has earned CN¥12.2 million at the Chinese box office.
