= Fei Wo Si Cun =

Chinese writer

Fei Wo Si Cun (Chinese: 匪我思存; born 26 December 1978) is the pen name of the Chinese writer Ai Jingjing (Chinese: 艾晶晶). She was born in Wuhan, Hubei, China. Many of her novels have been adapted into TV series. Her works include Too Late to Say I Love You (Chinese: 来不及说我爱你; pinyin: Lái Bù Jí Shuō Wǒ Aì Nǐ), Good Times Are Like Dreams (Chinese: 佳期如梦; pinyin: Jiā Qī Rú Mèng), and Siege in Fog (Chinese: 迷雾围城; pinyin: Mí Wù Wéi Chéng).

== Works published ==
- Split Brocade (裂锦)
- Lonely Courtyard in Late Spring (寂寞空庭春欲晚)
- Too Late To Say I Love You (来不及说我爱你)
- If at This Moment, I Did Not Meet You (如果这一秒, 我没有遇见你)
- Good Times Are Like Dreams (佳期如梦)
- The Cold Moon Is Like Frost (冷月如霜)
- The Bright Moon Was There at That Time (当时明月在)
- Fragrant Coldness (香寒)
- In This Life (今生今世)
- Flowers on the Sea (海上繁花)
- Peach Blossoms still Smiling at the Spring Breeze (桃花依旧笑春风)
- Don't Know When (景年知几时)
- Mountains Covered By Snow at Dusk (千山暮雪)
- Eastern Palace (东宫)
- Smile of Flowers (花颜)
- Bright (明媚)
- Dazzling Starlight (星光璀璨)
- Siege in Fog (迷雾围城)

== Drama adaptations ==
- The Girl in Blue (2010)
- Too Late to Say I Love You (2010)
- Sealed with a Kiss (2011)
- Chronicle of Life (2016)
- Siege in Fog (2018)
- Goodbye My Princess (2019)
- Tears in Heaven (2019)

== External linksink ==
Fei Wo Si Cun official website
