= All Out of Love (TV series) =

Chinese television series

- Promotional Poster
- Genre: Romance; Melodrama
- Based on: Liang Sheng, Can We Not Be Sad by Le Xiaomi
- Directed by: Liu Junjie
- Starring: Wallace Chung; Ma Tianyu; Yu Menglong; Sun Yi
- Composer: Lin Hai
- Country of origin: China
- Original language: Mandarin
- No. of seasons: 1
- No. of episodes: 70

Production
- Executive producer: Liu Miao
- Producer: Ma Zhongjun
- Production locations: Zhejiang, Shanghai, Paris
- Production company: Shanghai Mitao Pictures

Original release
- Network: Hunan TV
- Release: September 17, 2018

All Out of Love (Chinese: 凉生，我们可不可以不忧伤) is a 2018 Chinese television series based on Le Xiaomi's novel Liang Sheng, Can We Not Be Sad. It is directed by Liu Junjie, and stars Wallace Chung, Ma Tianyu, Yu Menglong, and Sun Yi. It airs on Hunan TV on September 17, 2018.

== Synopsis ==
Because of their family situation and hard life, Jiang Sheng (Sun Yi) and her older adopted brother, Liang Sheng (Ma Tianyu) leans on each other to survive. Even though materialistic substance was scarce, the greatest happiness for both of them was to be by each other's side.

After an accident during their university days, Liang Sheng got badly injured and disappears for many years. With the accompaniment of Cheng Tianyou (Wallace Chung), Jiang Sheng searches high and low for Liang Sheng. Cheng Tianyou also bears long-standing guilt toward his younger brother, Cheng Tian’en (Yu Menglong), who was left physically disabled due to a childhood accident. Tian’en’s presence and complex relationship with Tianyou place additional emotional strain on the family, affecting Tianyou’s decisions and interactions with those around him. Throughout the series, Tian’en’s condition and behavior subtly influence the unfolding events, shaping Tianyou’s sense of responsibility and contributing to the challenges he faces in his personal and romantic life. Tianyou falls in love with the seemingly normal but extraordinary Jiang Sheng. His devotion pays off, they fall in love and ready to start a family together. However, the reappearance of Liang Sheng complicates things as he was revealed to be Cheng Tianyou’s cousin. Led to believe Liang Sheng has terminal illness, Jiang sacrifices her relationship with Cheng Tianyou in order to take care of Liang Sheng. As Liang Sheng starts to recover, he finally confesses his love to Jiang Sheng and rejected by her. After many trials and tribulations Jiang Sheng finally realizes the true meaning of life and love, and decides to bravely pursue her heart. Jiang Sheng goes to France and after many hardships, the lovers finally harvested their faith in love.

== Cast ==
=== Main ===
- Wallace Chung as Cheng Tianyou

With superior appearance and commanding aura he is the eldest young master of The Cheng Organization who just returned from overseas and took over as CEO of The Cheng Organization; CEO of Yongnan Models an entertainment agency. He fell in love with Jiang Sheng at first sight. He stays by Jiang Sheng's side through thick and thin. After several separations from her he is still in love with her and waiting for her return. Unfortunately he became blind rescuing her and goes to Paris to protect her. After recovering he bravely pursues his heart and reconciles with Jiang Sheng. He also realizes his entrepreneurial ideal of changing the world in order to fulfill his life

- Ma Tianyu as Liang Sheng

Third young master of The Cheng Organization.Due to some events he becomes the adopted brother of Jiang Sheng when they were still kids. He’s extremely loyal caring and passionate to Jiang Sheng. He is deeply in love with only Jiang Sheng. Although he has been dating Wei Yang for more than a decade he cancels the wedding on the eve of the wedding. After Jiang Sheng marries Cheng Tianyou he gives them his blessings.

- Sun Yi as Jiang Sheng

Liang Sheng's sister-in-name with no blood relation. She heavily relies, depends and trusts her brother due to unfortunate family circumstances. After an accident he goes missing and with Cheng Tianyou’s help she searches for him but they fail to find him successfully. She falls in love with Cheng Tianyou but Liang Sheng’s return complicated things. With Liang Sheng seemingly suffering from terminal illness she sacrifices her love for Cheng Tianyou to accompany and save Liang Sheng’s life. After Liang Sheng recovers she leaves him to pursue true love.

- Yu Menglong as Cheng Tianen

Cheng Tianyou's brother. He was crippled since young due to his brother's negligence, causing him to be able to manipulate Cheng Tianyou to the latter's guilt.

- Meng Ziyi as Ning Wei Yang

Jiang Sheng's close friend, who is in love with Liang Sheng. Because of her unrequited love, she set down on a path of revenge and destruction.

=== Supporting ===
- Lu Ruo as Bei Xiaowu

Liang Sheng and Jiang Sheng's childhood friend. He likes Xiao Jiu.

- Wang Zhi as Ning Xin

Cheng Tianyou's business partner and assistant. She is in love with him but failed to come together with him due to a mistake made by her sister Ning Weiyang.

- He Zhilong as Qian Zi

Cheng Tianyou’s personal assistant who assists him in life and career.

- Huang Yilin as Su Man

An artist signed under Cheng Tianyou's company.

- Zhang Xiaochen as Lu Wenjun

Liang Sheng's half brother.

- Wang Herun as Jin Ling

A reporter. She is Jiang Sheng's closest friend and would do anything to protect her. She is also persistent toward her love for Cheng Tianen.

- Li Meng as Xiao Jiu

Jiang Sheng's friend. She(6 years old that time) and father were left alone when her mother ran away with another man. She fell in love with Bei Xiaowu. Later, finds her mother, who is suffer from brain trauma, and for the best treatment of her mother, she was forced to cheat Jiang Sheng.

- Wang Yizhe as Ba Bao
- Nile Telong as Ke Xiaorou
- Xu Fanxi as Jiang Sheng's mother
- Yan Luyang as Li Le
- Dongli Wuyou as Meng Haoran
- Liu Yapeng as Housekeeper

== Soundtrack ==
No.	Title	Lyrics	Music	Singers	Length
1.	"Love That Isn't Sad (不忧伤的爱)" (Opening theme song)	Yao Ruolong	Jack K	Wallace Chung
2.	"The Everlasting (生生不息)" (Ending theme song)	Yao Ruolong	Chen Xiaoxia	Ma Tianyu
3.	"The Most Beautiful Encounter (最美的遇见)"	He Mei	Da Sheng	Lala Hsu
4.	"Absence Makes the Heart Grow Fonder (近在远方)"	Liang Mang	Ma Shangyou	Ma Shangyou
5.	"Light Source (光源)"	Lin Qiao	Da Sheng	Zhang Lei
6.	"You Have Never Forgotten (你从未忘记)"	Zhou Jieying	Da Sheng	Reno Wang
7.	"If We Are Fall in Love (如果我们相爱)"	Li Yuzhe	Da Sheng	Meng Huiyuan & Zhang Hexuan
8.	"Angel & Devil (天使与恶魔)"	Zhou Pin	Zhou Pin	Zhou Pin
9.	"For You (为你专属)"	Li Yuzhe, He Mei	Da Sheng	Victor Wong
10.	"Love Story (爱的童话)"	Lv Jingye	Xiao Qiao	Ren Ran
11.	"Palpitate with Excitement (小悸动)"	Li Yuzhe, Zhang Jing	Da Sheng	Milk Coffee (Kiki)
12.	"A Type of Love (有一种喜欢)"	Lin Qiao, He Mei	Xiao Qiao	Zhou Ziyan
13.	"There's an Absolute in Life (生命有一种绝对)"	Ashin	Ashin	Wanting Qu
14.	"I Won't Let You Be Lonely (我不愿让你一个人)"	Ashin	Guan You, Ashin	Jia Jia

== Ratings ==
- Sunday to Thursday 20:00-22:00, Friday and Saturday 19:30-20:20

Air date	CSM52 city network ratings			National Internet ratings			
Air date	Episode	Ratings (%)	Audience share (%)	Rank	Ratings (%)	Audience share (%)	Rank
September 17, 2018	1-2	0.695	2.79	3	0.75	2.99	6
September 18, 2018	3-4	0.756	2.98	3	0.71	2.81	5
September 19, 2018	5-6	0.853	3.45	3	0.84	3.44	4
September 20, 2018	7-8	0.752	3.08	3	0.7	2.93	5
September 21, 2018	9	0.471	1.96	4	0.46	1.86	5
September 22, 2018	10	0.609	2.39	3	0.59	2.29	3
September 23, 2018	11-12	0.742	2.86	3	0.84	3.3	3
September 25, 2018	13-14	0.765	3.02	3	0.72	2.95	3
September 26, 2018	15-16	0.717	2.86	3	0.77	3.11	3
September 27, 2018	17-18	0.712	2.86	3	0.74	2.98	

- Monday, Tuesday 22:00-24:00

Air Date	CSM52 city network ratings			National Internet ratings			
Air Date	Episode	Ratings (%)	Audience share (%)	Rank	Ratings (%)	Audience share (%)	Rank
September 28, 2018	19-20	0.485	3.935	1	0.42	4.32	1
September 29, 2018	21-22	0.475	3.778	1	0.4	4.03	1
October 1, 2018	23-24	0.608	4.399	1	0.54	4.65	1
October 2, 2018	25-26	0.452	3.848	1	0.42	4.15	1
October 8, 2018	27-28	0.445	4.118	1	0.32	3.81	1
October 9, 2018	29-30	0.534	4.898	1	0.48	4.43	1
October 15, 2018	31-32	0.548	4.694	1	0.34	3.75	1
October 16, 2018	33-34	0.313	2.531	1	0.38	4.32	1
October 22, 2018	35-36	0.405	3.565	1	0.29	3.22	1
October 23, 2018	37-38	0.628	5.173	1	0.36	3.9	1
October 29, 2018	39-40	0,686	6.312	1	0.32	3.87	1
October 30, 2018	41-42	0.614	6.631	1	0,32	3.83	1
October 31, 2018	43-44	0.643	5.732	1	0.32	3.79	1
November 1, 2018	45-46	0.594	5.46	1	0.34	4.07	1
November 5, 2018	47-48	0.654	7.12	1	0.28	4.2	1
November 6, 2018	49-50	0.702	6.263	1	0.32	3.78	1
November 7, 2018	51-52	0.695	6.545	1	0.37	4.76	1
November 8, 2018	53-54	0.733	6.576	1	0.45	4.3	1
November 12, 2018	55-56	0.679	6.359	1	0.33	4.11	1
November 13, 2018	57-58	0.587	5.362	1	0.34	4.08	1
November 14, 2018	59-60	0.638	6.307	1	0.37	4.65	1
November 15, 2018	61-62	0.715	6.243	1	0.42	4.81	1
November 19, 2018	63-64	0.529	4.702	1	0.34	4.05	1
November 20, 2018	65-66	0.533	4.528	1	0.38	4.26	1
November 21, 2018	67-68	0.554	4.919	1	0.39	4.62	1
November 22, 2018	69-70	0.543	0.706	1	0.4	4.57	1
