= The Girl in Blue (TV series) =

Chinese name
- Traditional Chinese: 佳期如夢
- Simplified Chinese: 佳期如梦
Transcriptions
Standard Mandarin
- Hanyu Pinyin: Jiāqí Rú Mèng
- Genre: Romance; Drama
- Based on: Jiāqí Rú Mèng by Fei Wo Si Cun
- Directed by: Shen Yi; Song Xiang
- Starring: Joe Chen; Roy Chiu; Feng Shaofeng
- Opening theme: The First Lesson in Love by Zhang Xianzi
- Ending theme: Regret by Abin
- Country of origin: China
- Original language: Mandarin
- No. of episodes: 32

Production
- Producer: Liu Haiyan
- Running time: 40 minutes

Original release
- Network: Hunan Television
- Release: 4 June – 17 June 2010

The Girl in Blue (Chinese: 佳期如夢; pinyin: Jiāqí Rú Mèng) is a 2010 Chinese television series starring Joe Chen, Roy Chiu and Feng Shaofeng. It is based on the novel of the same name by Fei Wo Si Cun. The series aired on Hunan Television from 4 June to 17 June 2010 for 32 episodes.

== Synopsis ==
You Jiaqi is a manager at an advertising company. One day, she meets her ex-boyfriend Meng Heping by chance at a car promotional event. The encounter made them realize the importance of the other party in their hearts. Just when Heping wants to defy his Mom's wishes to reconcile the love between him and Jiaqi, his best friend Ruan Zhengdong starts to chase after Jiaqi fervently. However, the reason behind Zhengdong's actions hides a darker and deeper secret.

== Cast ==
- Joe Chen as You Jiaqi
- Roy Chiu as Ruan Zhengdong
- Feng Shaofeng as Meng Heping
- Lu Chen as Ruan Jiangxi
- Xu Xing as Jiang Yun
- Lin Xiujun as Xiao Yun
- Cao Yanyan as Wang Shuxian
- Ji Jie as Xu Shifeng
- Wang Siwei as Zhou Jingan
- Li Shipeng as Guo Jin
- Zhao Liying as An An

== Soundtrack ==
The Girl in Blue - Original Television Soundtrack (佳期如夢电视剧原声音乐大碟)
No.	Title	Music	Length
1.	"The First Lesson in Love (爱情第一课)"	Zhang Xianzi
2.	"Regret (遗憾)"	Abin
3.	"Peers (二人同行)"	Jocie Kok
4.	"My Beloved Old Friend (深爱的老朋友)"	Abin
5.	"Happy Life (幸福乐活)"	Zhang Xianzi
6.	"Heart like Daggers (心如刀割)"	Jacky Cheung
