= Best Time (TV series) =

Chinese television series

- Genre: Romance; Drama
- Based on: The Most Beautiful Time by Tong Hua
- Written by: Yu Xiaoqian; Jing Yuanyuan; Du Jun
- Directed by: Cang Lai-zan
- Starring: Wallace Chung; Janine Chang; Jia Nailiang; Catherine Han
- Opening theme: Willing to Get One's Heart by Yu Zonglin
- Ending theme: Expired Love by Yu Zonglin
- Country of origin: China
- Original language: Mandarin
- No. of seasons: 1
- No. of episodes: 47

Production
- Producer: Yu Yi
- Production location: China
- Production companies: Xing Sheng Di Movie & Television Culture Co., Ltd.

Original release
- Network: Hunan Satellite TV
- Release: 20 November – 22 December 2013

Best Time
- Traditional Chinese: 最美的時光
- Simplified Chinese: 最美的时光
Transcriptions
Standard Mandarin
- Hanyu Pinyin: Zuì Měi De Shí Guāng

Best Time (Chinese: 最美的時光) is a 2013 Chinese television series based on the novel The Most Beautiful Time by Tong Hua. It aired on Hunan TV from 20 November to 22 December 2013.

== Synopsis ==
In high school, Su Man (Janine Chang) fell in love with Song Yi (Jia Nailiang), a student with good academics and superior basketball skills. She was then admitted to Tsinghua University School of Management and have never heard about him since. Ten years later, Su Man finds out that Song Yi is back from the United States and is the new director of MG Company. She decides to join the company and applies for a clerk post faking her resume. The Chief Investment Officer Lu Licheng (Wallace Chung), who aspires to become the CEO of the company, finds out her true identity and threatens her; yet he appreciates her talent and keeps her by his side. The events took an unexpected turn when Su Man's best friend Xu Lianshuang falls for Song Yi, and Lu Licheng develops feelings for Su Man.

== Cast ==
- Wallace Chung as Lu Licheng
- Janine Chang as Su Man
- Jia Nailiang as Song Yi
- Catherine Han as Xu Lianshuang
- Jiang Yijia as Lin Da
- Xiang Jin as Chun Ni
- Jiang Kai as Mike
- Ying Er as Xu Qiu
- Jiang Yijia as Lin Da
- Mou Xiangying as Helen
- Liu Ling as Mrs. Xu
- He Jiang as Xu Zhongjin

== Soundtrack ==
Best Time - Original Television Soundtrack (最美的時光电视剧原声音乐大碟)
No.	Title	Music	Length
1.	"Willing to Get One's Heart (愿得一人心)"	Yu Zonglin
2.	"Expired Love (过期爱情)"	Yu Zonglin
3.	"The Most Beautiful Moment (最美的时光)"	Han Jing

== Awards and nominations ==
Year	Award	Category	Nominated work	Result
2013	5th China TV Drama Awards	Most Popular Actor (Hong Kong/Taiwan)	Wallace Chung	Won
