= Tears in Heaven (TV series) =

Chinese television drama program

- Also known as: My Dear Chief

Chinese name
- Traditional Chinese: 佳如梦之海上繁花
- Simplified Chinese: 佳期如梦之海上繁
Transcriptions
Standard Mandarin
- Hanyu Pinyin: Hai Shang Bang Hua
- Genre: Romance; Melodrama; Tragedy; Fiction
- Created by: Fei Wo Si Cun
- Based on: Variety Flowers At Seaside
- Directed by: Hua Qing
- Creative director: Shen Yi
- Starring: Shawn Dou; Li Qin; Zhang Yunlong; Ai Ru; Sheng Ziming; Wang Rui Zi; Li Ting Zhe
- Opening theme: Yang Jiong Han - Lost Lovers
- Ending theme: Ava Zhao - Transparent
- Country of origin: China
- Original language: Mandarin
- No. of seasons: 1
- No. of episodes: 41

Production
- Executive producers: Yang Yu; Bu Yu
- Producers: Zhang Sheng Yan; Jiang Xiao Ping
- Production locations: Shanghai; Pingtan
- Running time: 45 minutes
- Production companies: Shuimu Qingyuan Entertainment, Dream Sky Films, Impact Media, Omnijoi

Original release
- Network: iQiyi, Tencent, Youku, Kukan, Mango TV, Hunan TV, WeTV
- Release: 23 June 2021 – July 24, 2021

Tears in Heaven (in Chinese:海上繁花; Hai Shang Bang Hua, also known as "My Dear Chief") in Spain, Tears in Heaven, in Mexico, Tears in Paradise is a Chinese television drama series based on the novel written by Fei Wo Si Cun and directed by Hua Qing. It stars Shawn Dou, Li Qin, Leon Zhang, Ai Ru, Sheng Ziming, Wang Rui Zi, Li Ting Zhe, the drama was filmed in Shanghai and Pingtan island which was broadcast on various channels from June 23 to July 24, 2021.

== Synopsis ==
Du Xiaosu is an entertainment reporter looking for the scoop to interview actress Yan Jingjing on her arrival at the airport, on the other hand, a businessman Lei Yuzheng is seen who was about to go on a business trip. Suddenly Du Xiaosu and Lei Yuzheng collide on the road, they meet again since they met in the past, she apologizes horrified, while Lei Yuzheng upon seeing her recognizes him and remembers that night when he was driving and saw Du Xiaosu walking on the road, fainting under the rain. rain while he saves and took him away, since that night his memory left a mark on him all his life and he has not forgotten it. Later, Du Xiaosu, missing the interview, finds a way and poses as a nurse and sneaks into a hospital room to take a photo of the rising star patient after the car accident, then meets Shao Zhenrong, a friendly man. and handsome doctor on duty, who begins to feel attracted, both meet and begin their relationship, finally they were going to get married and have a home, given that the love interests towards Du Xiaosu were Shao Zherong, Lei Yuzheng as well as Lin Xiangyuan and the Mr.Liu.

She has an appointment with Shao Zhenrong for her birthday, when leaving the restaurant she sees Lei Yuzheng with the new actress Xu You, Du Xiaosu met him through social networks and interviews seemed unfair and decides to talk to actress Yan Jingjing who was fired Du Xiaosu decides to do him justice, looking to interview him and claim him, he stops on the road while Lei Yuzheng sees him inside the vehicle remembering her, so they communicate in person for the first time but both begin to have prejudices. Later, when he invites to meet all his family, Du Xiaosu meets and is reunited with his brother to his horror he discovers that he is Lei Yuzheng, then Shao Zhenrong's mother reveals that she had an affair with his father who had abandoned him leaving his heart wounded as he that he forbids his relationship with Shao Zhenrong because he could not welcome him into the family, since it would be a constant reminder of his pain, due to the situation Du Xiaosu breaks up with Shao Zhenrong, he without knowing the reason is heartbroken and decides to go to Yunnan . On his way, he faces a landslide on the highway, resulting in serious injuries. Du Xiaosu travels to Yunnan to recover Shao Zherong but finds out that he had an accident, and, horrified, he goes to look for him. While in the hospital, he sees Shao Zhenrong fighting for her life while she sees him for the last time saying goodbye and dies in front of her leaving her in pain after fainting she sees Shao Zhenrong crying while Lei Yuzheng full of anger and pain separates Du Xiaosu from Shao Zhenrong judging her cruelly and coldly asks her to go away and walk away that is not worthy of him.

With everyone in the cemetery at the end, Du Xiaosu decides to go but on the way he meets Lei Yuzheng, preventing him from approaching, both of them start to argue in pain and he begins to speak ill of her, having prejudices, Du Xiaosu not knowing why he treats him so badly, Lei Yuzheng confesses to her the rainy night how they met, making her remember, a year ago he saw her unconscious on the road while driving, he got out of the car to help her and took him to his apartment, while there Lei Yuzheng took off her outfit wet and takes Du Xiaosu in his arms in the bedroom laying her down, hence Du Xiaosu woke up drunk and saw her and begins to seduce him by giving him her love and captivation, at that moment Lei Yuzheng felt attracted and wanted by her, both were together that night, but she faints and since then she does not remember. When Du Xiaosu finds out, she is surprised what happened, what she remembers is that she went to the restaurant and they told her that a man sent her back the night before without realizing it that he went to Lei Yuzheng's apartment and paid for the alcohol by informing the waiter, to which Lei Yuzheng asks him to leave and not bother Shao Zhenrong.

Du Xiaosu, in pain and feeling guilty, wants to fulfill Shao Zhenrong's dream and get the house that he gave her, but she finds out that it is for sale by Lei Yuzheng, so she is going to claim it by confronting and fighting for it, Lei Yuzheng fires her from the house. company but Du Xiaosu without giving up begins to look for work as a waitress in a bar, fighting for her designs, working in the construction site risking her life without stopping until one day she visits the grave of Shao Zhenrong confessing that her effort is in vain that he can no longer go on, Lei Yuzheng, seeing Du Xiaosu's suffering and pain, is moved, decides to help her without knowing why he decides to return her house, Du Xiaosu, upon finding out, thanks him, taking him to the restaurant where Shao Zhenrong used to eat after leaving from the hospital, surprised Lei Yuzheng sees Du Xiaosu crying, showing his tenderness and sweetness before him, feeling anguished at seeing her suffer and affected by being treated so badly without knowing her, then Du Xiaosu shares a boat ticket asking her for a favor to go to visit the children in Pingtan Island in company, Lei Yuzheng is excited and both travel together get to know the children and the sun teacher who brings them joy, love and happiness, Du Xiaosu and Lei Yuzheng begin to get along, understand each other Starting their friendship being friends, Lei Yuzheng confides in her for the first time, he tells her about his past to which Du Xiaosu encourages and supports him.

After the trip, being in Shanghai, his school takes him to a secret place where he tells him about his childhood with Shao Zherong, letting his memories affect Du Xiaosu, to which Lei Yuzheng gives him encouragement. As the months go by, they both spend pleasant moments together in the annual yutian festival, the engagement of Lin Xiangyuan and Jiang Fanlu, in business matters, visiting the island to see the children, leaving behind the prejudices and misunderstandings they had, Lei Yuzheng sees in her a wonderful woman and special so she can't resist secretly helping her, who she believes is a pervert who only wants to harass him, on several occasions Du Xiaosu gets nervous and blushes when Lei Yuzheng approaches her or when they are alone, they both fall in love hiding his feelings. On the other hand, Lin Xiangyuan ruins Lei Yuzheng by taking him to prison, from there he changed his attitude, becoming cruel. Upon learning what happened, Du Xiaosu is affected and sad so she decides to help him, he takes care of his father, Mr. Lei Ting, making sacrifices. for Lei Yuzheng, while spending eight months, he is released from prison, he learns the truth about his mother and loses his father, leaving him deeply hurt, he enters a depressive trauma, compulsively begins to treat everyone badly, including Du Xiaosu, for which he hurts his feelings, being affected and hurting himself, seeing that Du Xiaosu is by his side without giving up helping him Lei Yuzheng is shocked, regretful, depressed, he values it very much and clung to her, thanks to Du Xiaosu Lei Yuzheng returns to the company, so he makes up for lost time, both being in love, they begin to be together supporting each other, but Du Xiaosu, upon meeting his rich friends, feels that he will not fit in, he will not be like them, so he walks away, being indifferent to Lei Yuzheng leaving him devastated as the circumstances some men chase him so he distances himself to protect her, but she believes and feels that she is being betrayed so she begins to doubt her feelings towards Lei Yuzheng causing great pain and affecting her health, Lei Yuzheng, seeing her in poor condition, cannot resist being separated from Du Xiaosu for even a moment, so he wants to conquer her and recover her.

On the other hand, Zou Siqi and He Qunfei, Jiang Fanlu and Lin Xiangyuan get married, they invite both to the wedding as witnesses, the couples are already married, He Siqi and Lin Fanlu, the brides throw the bouquets, choosing Du Xiaosu and Lei Yuzheng, being the following boyfriends to get married so Du Xiaosu is amazed, shakes hands while Lei Yuzheng feels lucky and excited, both accept with great happiness to which Lei Yuzheng finds it difficult to resist his love for Du Xiaosu decides to get closer and pursue her by becoming her assistant, while Du Xiaosu continues with his design work, he asks her to help her, so she agrees, spending a week Lei Yuzheng wants to have a serious love relationship with Du Xiaosu but she rejects him, which makes her sad, Du Xiaosu doesn't know if her Destiny is to be together with him since she does not want him to change and try hard for her because she knows her true self and is afraid of being harmed, but deep down she loves him. Then director Liu breaks the news to Du Xiaosu that she will be the chosen one. arcticteta designer contestant in Paris for a year so she has to go abroad putting her in a difficult decision, Lei Yuzheng upon finding out goes to look for her, asking her not to leave and wants to help her but Du Xiaosu decided to go fulfill her dream so He asks her to let her go, Lei Yuzheng with a wounded and devastated heart feels that he is losing her and is hurt by his decision and seeing her leave his side, but Lei Yuzheng does not give up, he feels that he cannot live without her, he realizes that his love and happiness that he longed for and hoped was Du Xiaosu had fallen in love with her from the beginning, he loves him deeply, secretly Lei Yuzheng has an engagement ring to give her as a gift, willing to fight for the love of his life.

Du Xiaosu prepares his luggage to go to Paris to compete but not before calling the sun teacher to tell him to visit her without realizing that Lei Yuzheng follows him, having prepared a gift especially for her, Du Xiaosu travels to the island to visit The children being there see the teacher Sun telling him that the foundation is in his name by Lei Yuzheng to which he is surprised and that both are in charge of helping to build buildings so that better donors come for new teachers and for the children in the school Later, later Du Xiaosu walking towards the shores of the sea feels a great sadness and loneliness in his heart that he misses and at the same time remembers the good times he spent together with Lei Yuzheng, to his surprise fate brought them together again, they both meet again while they are together on the island Lei Yuzheng confesses her love to Du Xiaosu asking him to be by her side, she will wait for him on the island until his return after a year has passed and be part of it for the rest of his life, she sadly crying to go to the foreigner and not wanting to leave him, he realizes his sacrifice that he cannot live without her, destined to be together being his true love of Du Xiaosu, he accepts it to which Lei Yuzheng with full of happiness fulfills his dream of being happy and loving, being Both happily surrender to each other, demonstrating their love, giving each other a passionate kiss and a warm hug under the setting sun, fulfilling their dreams, being the lucky lovers in love, they will be the next to marry, so their paths were separated, now Du Xiaosu and Lei Yuzheng are a united parallel.

== Cast ==
=== Main ===
Actor	Character	N.º Episode	Introduction
Shawn Dou	Lei Yuzheng	41	He is a businessman, president and ceo of the company that is in charge of yutian by his father Mr. Lei who is sick. He was abandoned as a child by his mother Mrs. Wanhua which is why he is very cold, sarcastic and arrogant but on the other hand he is honest and kind. One rainy night, he meets a woman named Du Xiaosu, the love of his life, on the road unconscious. He saves her and takes her with him. He was instantly smitten by her and he fell in love with her almost immediately. A year passed by, until one day he collided with her again at the airport where Lei Yuzheng recognized her but Du Xiaosu did not remember him. But he vividly remembered the night he spent with her. Lei Yuzheng suffered during his childhood since then he had memories of his past. On the other hand, he also finds out about Shao Zhenrong's relationship with Du Xiaosu and he prevents himself from getting in between the pair as he did not want Shao Zhenrong and Du Xiaosu to be hurt and be in dilemma. But when Du Xiaosu breaks up with Shao Zhengrong on the request of his mother, he sees how badly Shao Zhenrong suffers yet being constantly hopeful of her. Lei Yuzheng suffers an emotional setback when Shao Zhenrong abruptly dies in a misfortune accident. He is extremely hurt and blames Du Xiaosu for the misfortune befell upon Shao Zhenrong. He maintains an emotional distance with Du Xiaosu and is rude to her. But after spending time while seeing the suffering and pain of Du Xiaosu, he begins to feel hurt that persecutes him yet does not know why. As time goes by Lei Yuzheng begins to understand her and shares her life experience. He also forms a deep friendship with Du Xiaosu while supporting and helping her, making her favors without realizing that he loves her, but after her attitude is indifferent as her life is ruined by Lin Xiangyuan and the loss of her family, she is indifferent to Du Xiaosu and begins to treat her badly and be cruel to her because she does not want to resummon her and hurt her, but Du Xiaosu helps him if how he did for her, Lei Yuzheng is hurt by all the damage he caused and begins to change by himself. After his life is restored with the help of Du Xiaosu he confesses her feelings but Du Xiaosu rejects him on several occasions but he can't live without her and doesn't give up and conquers him until Du Xiaosu accepts his love and forms his loving relationship full of happiness with her being her boyfriend, he was chosen the Next to get married together with Du Xiaosu, Lei Yuzheng feels lucky he even has an engagement ring to give her and propose to her, he is prepared to have a beautiful life next to his true love destined with Du Xiaosu to which Lei Yuzheng is happy.
Li Qin	Du Xiaosu	41	She is a reporter and architectural designer, who has a noble spirit of never giving up, she is humble, sensitive, sweet, tender of good feelings who believes in true love and destiny, she likes to help people and do her job She even risks her life and her health, but when she feels that her life is collapsing, she begins to drink even though she is allergic to alcohol, until one rainy night she faints and a businessman named Lei Yuzheng sees him on the road and calls him out. saved, she being drunk began to approach and seduce him with passion, Lei Yuzheng was attracted to her, until she meets him again at the airport but she forgot. On the other hand, she meets Shao Zhenrong in the hospital when she gets dressed as a nurse to interview the actress who suffered an accident, there she begins to have a love interest and forms her relationship with him, Du Xiaosu meets her family until she finds out that Lei Yuzheng is her brother, she is horrified, then Shao Zhenrong's mother asks him to end their relationship, leaving Du Xiaosu wounded, which also caused Shao Zhenrong's death, he felt guilty, full of pain and suffering, Lei Yuzheng, seeing her wounded, is affected, helps him and heals the wounds he left behind. Shao Zhenrong. As time goes by, she forms her friendship with him, feeling supported, she begins to have feelings for Lei Yuzheng, who, on the other hand, suffers a lot because she hurts him, causing him harm. She even begins to doubt the love she has for him since they have different paths, but She loves him and finally realized that her true destined love was Lei Yuzheng, she begins to have her relationship with him, Du Xiaosu was chosen to be the next to marry and is happy at Lei Yuzheng's side.
Leon Zhang	Shao Zhenrong	41	He is a doctor who takes care of his patients and helps those in need, he is the brother of Lei Yuzheng and Du Xiaosu's first love is kind, good, understanding, kind and warm. One day he meets Du Xiaosu in the hospital and meets again with her in the restaurant where they eat they are attracted, later he sees Du Xiaosu is disguised as a nurse to interview the actress but is discovered by Shao Zhenrong begins to fall in love with Du Xiaosu, they meet and form their love relationship until he introduces her entire family including Lei Yuzheng who leaves her moved, then Shao Zhenrong commits to Du Xiaosu that she wants to get married and has plans for the future, he wished to have a house to live with her, he also showed her a photo of an island where master sun lives and the children that he has been financing by helping them and he wants to go visit them together with Du Xiaosu to introduce them all but he never got to meet them. Later Du Xiaosu breaks up with him due to the request Because of his mother, without knowing the real reason, he decided to go to Yunnan, before leaving Lei Yuzheng finds out what happened, asking if he deserves his pain for her, which he says yes, asking him to take care of Du Xiaosu. secret Shao Zhenrong had an engagement ring made that he could not give it to him but Du Xiaosu realizes he keeps it and goes to look for it traveling to Yunnan. During his trip he suffers an accident and is taken to an emergency, Du Xiaosu runs to where Shao Zhenrong is for Last time he sees him with happiness, he immediately goes after him and dies in her arms leaving her injured, after the funeral Du Xiaosu goes to visit him and decides to fulfill Shao Zhenrong's dream by striving and taking risks. Several times Du Xiaosu mourns the loss of his love who feels like he can't take it anymore and misses him, Lei Yuzheng sees Du Xiaosu suffering at the funeral when he goes to see his brother, his mother Shao Kaixuan misses him a lot.

=== Supporting ===
Actor	Character	N.º Episode	Introduction
Ai Ru	Zou Siqi / He Siqi	41	She is hardworking, cheerful and Du Xiaosu's best friend, they live in the same apartment that they had rented together, she supports him, helps him in good and bad times, she has a love relationship with He Qunfei for three years but argues with him every time due to financial problems. After accepting the proposal of his love He Qunfei they get married and live together in their new house that Lei Yuzheng gave as their wedding gift, Du Xiaosu admires the love they have for each other.
Sheng Ziming	He Qunfei	41	He is the assistant and right-hand man of Lei Yuzheng and his friend, he is kind, good, detailed but sometimes he gets into difficulties, he has an affair with Zou Siqi and a three-year relationship and is a friend of Du Xiaosu, his parents want him to be rich and marries his girlfriend after marrying Zou Siqi, Lei Yuzheng presents him with a house and makes him the manager of the company.
Wang Rui Zi	Jiang Fanlu / Lin Fanlu	41	She is a model, she grew up together with Lei Yuzheng and Shao Zherong, she traveled to France and returned to see her father and Lei Yuzheng, she is capricious, conceited and has envy of Du Xiaosu and interest in Lei Yuzheng since she was little, but then she takes him as his brother, begins to form. She has a relationship with Lin Xiangyuan and they get engaged. She becomes pregnant because she spent a night with him. She decides to have a family with Lin Xiangyuan but he begins to attack her because she lost her son. Then she had her second child and they both take care of him.
Li Ting Zhe	Lin Xiangyuan	41	He is Lei Yuzheng's assistant and employee, he is smug, stubborn, he feels great envy and anger towards Lei Yuzheng which ruins his life, he was also Du Xiaosu's college friend who was attracted to her in the past but was even rejected. They met again at the yutian company, until he met Jiang Fanlu, he fell in love, he decided to be with her, but Jiang Fanlu did not accept it until they spent a night together and both began to form their relationship, they got engaged and had a son.

=== Recurring Characters ===
==== The Du Family ====
Actor	Character	N.º Episode	Introduction
Nuo Nuo	Du Senior	41	She is the sister of Du Xiaosu and daughter of Ruohua and Du Maokai, she is seen in an episode where she meets her sister for a while, Du Xiaosu asks her to rent the workshop for her architectural design work, Du Senior accepts. because he trusts his sister, while she goes abroad they say goodbye.
Du He Qian	Du Ruohua	41	She is Du Xiaosu's mother and Du Maokai's wife met her when she was conscious on the hit road and he took him on the way to the hospital, Du Ruohua was an orphan.
Liu Bo Xi	Du Maokai	41	He is Du Xiaosu's father and Du Ruohua's husband. He also had a relationship in the past with Shao Kaixuan, Shao Zhenrong's mother, but he met Du Xiaosu's mother on the way, saves him and takes care of him, but he forgot Shao Kaixuan with him weather.

==== The Lei Family ====
Actor	Character	N.º Episode	Introduction
Dong Jia Wei	Lei Wanhua	41	She is the mother of Lei Yuzheng and wife of Lei Ting in the past, she left the house due to the aggressions of her father who had to abandon Lei Yuzheng that caused her great pain and different in her attitude, she even appeared in her dreams and until the last sending him a message.
TianTan	Lei Ting	41	He is the father of Lei Yuzheng and husband of Lei Wanhua suffers cardiac arrest due to many efforts and problems with his mother Lei Yuzheng, he built a company together with his son calling it Yutian, passing the time Mr. Lei Ting fell ill due to which Lei Yuzheng will take over the company, but when he finds out that his son is going to prison, Mr. Lei loses his sanity due to his brain disease, so Du Xiaosu takes care of his father, calling him marshmallow by name. his tenderness and being sweet, when Lei Yuzheng leaves prison his father says if they both got married because they are together in the house, in the end his father comes to his senses and confesses everything to Lei Yuzheng about the past until he dies the next day leaving Lei Yuzheng sore and alone but Du Xiaosu is by his side.

==== The Shao Family ====
Actor	Character	N.º Episode	Introduction
Gu Kaili	Shao Kaixuan	41	The mother of Shao Zhenrong and a widow. She had a relationship with Du Xiaosu's father that had caused her so much pain that she also compelled Du Xiaosu to end her relationship with Shao Zhengrong. Because of her request caused the loss of Shao Zhenrong being in so much pain, left alone and eventually dying.

==== The Jiang Family ====
Actor	Character	N.º Episode	Introduction
Wang Xin Min	Jiang Jin	41	He is Jiang Fanlu's father, Lei Yuzheng's uncle, Lei Ting's best friend and Lin Xiangjuan's father-in-law who is also in charge of the entertainment city and supervisor of the yutian company, he is careful, generous and responsible.

==== The He Family ====
Actor	Character	N.º Episode	Introduction
Li Qian	He Galu	41	She is the mother of He Qunfei and his other son, wife of He Li and mother-in-law of Zou Siqi. She wants to see her son get married and rich and help her brother who had gotten engaged, leaving Zou Siqi uneasy.
Wang Min	He Li	41	He is the father of He Qunfei and father-in-law of Zou Siqi who wants his son to be successful and get married and also asks him to help his brother in his engagement.

==== The Lin Family ====
Actor	Character	N.º Episode	Introduction
Hu Jia Hua	Lin Dun	41	She is the mother of Lin Xiangjuan and mother-in-law of Jiang Fanlu. She misses her son. She lives in Pingtan, a small town where Lei Yuzheng and He Qunfei went to find out the past and investigate. She was also in contact with her son and even came to his wedding for Jiang Fanlu's request, leaving his son surprised, and at Jiang Jin's house, the four of them share, leaving everyone sad until they finally say goodbye and return to their hometown without first telling Lin Xiangjuan to fix things, the mistake he made.
Cao Shi Ping	Lin Bo	41	He is the father of Lin Xiangjuan and father-in-law of Jiang Fanlu who has watched his son for a long time and seen his success.

=== Other characters ===
Actor	Character	N.º Episode	Introduction
Zhang Hao Cheng	Liu Siyang	41	He is Lei Yuzheng's friend, they met in prison for a year, they were together sharing the same cell, they become friends, when they leave prison Liu Siyang helps him in the company by looking for evidence to prove Lei Yuzheng's innocence, he also meets Du Xiaosu when He talked to her telling her how it felt to happen in the cell, he also becomes friends with Shangguan.
Zhao Yue Cheng	Xie Li	41	Lin Xiangjuan's right-hand man, he was employed by Lei Yuzheng for having cheated behind his back. He, enraged, allies himself with Lin Xiangjuan since he found out that he also despises and envies Lei Yuzheng. Xie Li, taking advantage of the situation, both put together Lei Yuzheng in prison, he was in charge of giving information to the journalist he hired, he was even with another director of another company receiving orders in exchange for being more than a sourburnidad.
Wei Guan Nan	Shangguan Bo Yao	41	He is Lei Yuzheng's friend, he also took advantage of Du Xiaosu's humility at the club when he was going to buy more drinks in exchange if he drinks the entire bottle of alcohol but Lei Yuzheng stops him and takes Du Xiaosu in his arms, too. When he invited Lei Yuzheng to the celebration and when he accompanied his friend to the cemetery saying to let him court Du Xiaosu making Lei Yuzheng angry, he is also a friend of Liu Siyang together they help in the company.
Gao Shu Yao	Yan Jingjing	41	She is an actress in a soap opera but was fired by Lei Yuzheng for allying herself with Xie Li, who is not trustworthy for him. She also had an accident when Du Xiaosu was going to interview her at the airport and he followed her, causing a crash for the actress, but Du Xiaosu being unconscious, she gets up and helps Yan Jingjing, she was taken to the hospital along with Du Xiaosu, that is where she meets Shao Zhenrong, also when Yan Jingjing wanted to commit suicide, she pretended to make a controversy to make a show and came to journalism, leaving Lei Yuzheng ridiculed, also when Du Xiaosu decides to do justice for her, which gets him into trouble with Lei Yuzheng because of Yan Jingjing's pretense.
Yi Shan	Xu You	41	She is an actress in soap operas that she formed together with Lei Yuzheng and they were also dating but Lei Yuzheng breaks up with her because she only wants to be famous using him, without having understanding and mutual affection, he realized that Xu You is not for him until he meets the indicated Du Xiaosu with whom he fell in love, leaving Xu You as Du Xiaosu's rival, but there were also misunderstandings when they discussed Xu You with Lei Yuzheng.
Dong Zi Liang	Xiao Sun	41	He is the teacher of the orphan children he takes care of at the school near Pingtan Island where Shao Zhenrong helps by donating money as aid and writing letters, so they do not get to see them after they die, Du Xiaosu and Lei Yuzheng meet the teacher and the children making both happy.
Karl Robert Eislen	Professor Ohm	41	He is Du Xiaosu's professor and idol at the university, and when Lei Yuzheng finds out, he goes to him asking him to accompany him to Shanghai as a surprise, leaving Du Xiaosu surprised when he sees him in person, thanking Lei Yuzheng for the gift, a fact that he actor speaks in English just like Shawn Dou with his original voice translating his words.
Zhang Xiao Gui	Ali Su	41	He is Lei Yuzheng's friend.
Ma Xiao Kai	Ye Shenkuan	41	Supervisor of Lei Yuzheng's company.
Liu Bo Xi	Li Mengnan	41	He is a confidant of Lei Yuzheng.
Wei Jun	Wang Guixiang	41	It is run by Lei Yuzheng's company.
Li Dong	Lao Mo	41	He is Lei Yuzheng's employee.
Yuan Fan	Reporter	41	He is one of the reporters along with Du Xiaosu.
Yan Yi Min	Director Liu	41	He is the director of Du Xiaosu's design and work, he is also in love with her, leaving Lei Yuzheng jealous and a rival, having fights when Du Xiaosu went out with Mr. Liu, Lei Yuzheng overheard their conversation and when they met again he had arguments with he.
Zhu Xiao Gang	Assistant	41	He is the assistant and company of actress Yan Jingjing who supports him in everything.

== Episode ==
Tears in Heaven series was confirmed for 41 episodes (Direct Uncut Version) in China from 2021.

In the last episode they had a happy ending together where Shawn Dou and Li Qin are satisfied.

According to the original book, the novel has more chapters, so less is told in the drama.

== Soundtrack ==
The Tears in Heaven soundtrack is confirmed by seven songs:

N⁰	Artist	Music	Note
1	Yang Jiong Han	"Lost Lovers" (遗失的恋人)	(Opening Theme Song)
2	Fu Yao	"If Only" (付垚)	(Lei Yuzheng and Shao Zhenrong Theme Song)
3	Zhang HeXuan	"Taste of the Wind" (風的味道)	(Jiang Fanlu and Lin Xiangyuan Theme Song)
4	Wan Ling Lin	"Taste of the Wind (Heart-warming Version)" (風的味道|暖心版)	(Du Xiaosu and Shao Zhenrong Theme Song)
5	Chen Bing	"Some Words Are Only Remembered By Those Who Listen" (有些話只有聽的人記得)	(Zou Siqi and He Qunfei Theme Song)
6	Jing Xin Yan	"Want to have Someone" (想要有一個人)	(Du Xiaosu and Lei Yuzheng Theme Song)
7	Ava Zhao	"Transparent" (透明)	(Ending Theme Song)

== Production ==
The series is based on the novel " Variety Flowers At Seaside" (Chinese:佳期如梦之海上繁花) by Fei Wo Si Cun.

The series was also known as "Tears in Heaven" (Chinese:海上繁花).

It was directed by director Hua Qing and Shen Yi.

In the production, he had Zhang Sheng Yan and Jiang Xiao Ping along with the support of executive producer Yang Yu and Bu Yu.

The protagonists who play their characters were called similar to their names but interspersed.

The soundtrack are by various artists and the melody is by the director.

It featured production companies Shuimu Qingyuan Entertainment, Dream Sky Films, Impact Media, Omnijoi, and was distributed by Jiangsu TV.

Filming started on November 18, 2016, in Shanghai and on Pingtan Island until March 9, 2017.

=== Popularity ===
The drama has been surprised by fans of the author, who is known for her melodramas and uncontrollable tears that took four years to show.

== International Transmission ==
The series was broadcast internationally through YouTube, the reunion of episodes was 41 and seen by everyone worldwide.

Flag	Title	String	Broadcast Date (Channel, Day and Time)	Grades
China	海上繁花	iQiyi, Tencent, Youku, Kukan, Mango TV, Hunan TV, WeTV	June 23, 2021 - July 24, 2021; Monday to Friday, 8:00 p.m.	Mandarín Chinese
