= Three (2016 film) =

2016 Hong Kong-Chinese film by Johnnie To

- Film poster

Chinese name
- Traditional Chinese: 三人行
- Simplified Chinese: 三人行
Transcriptions
Standard Mandarin
- Hanyu Pinyin: Sān Rén Xíng
Yue: Cantonese
- Jyutping: Saam1 Jan4 Hang4
- Directed by: Johnnie To
- Screenplay by: Yau Nai-hoi; Lau Ho-leung; Mak Tin-shu
- Produced by: Johnnie To; Yau Nai-hoi
- Starring: Zhao Wei; Louis Koo; Wallace Chung
- Cinematography: Cheng Siu-Keung
- Edited by: David Richardson
- Music by: Xavier Jamaux
- Production companies: Media Asia Films iQiyi Motion Pictures; Impact Media Company; Beijing Baidu Netcom Science Technology; Shanghai Gewa Business Information Consulting; Wuxi Soulpower Culture Media; Media Asia Distributions (Beijing); China Film Media Asia Video Distribution; Milkyway Image
- Distributed by: Media Asia Distributions; Media Asia Film Distribution (Beijing) (China); Iqiyi Pictures (China)
- Release dates: 24 June 2016 (China); 14 July 2016 (Hong Kong)
- Running time: 88 minutes
- Countries: Hong Kong; China
- Languages: Cantonese; Mandarin
- Budget: CN¥40 million
- Box office: CN¥100.4 million (China)

Three is a 2016 action film produced and directed by Johnnie To and starring Zhao Wei, Louis Koo and Wallace Chung. A Hong Kong-Chinese co-production, the film was released on 24 June 2016 in China and 30 June 2016 in Hong Kong, while it is also the closing film of the 2016 Taipei Film Festival on 10 July 2016.

== Plot ==
Shun (Wallace Chung), a thug, is shot in the head by a cop due to miscommunication during an interrogation and is taken to the hospital. In the hospital, he claims human rights to refuse surgery to remove the bullet inside his head in order to bide time for his underlings to rescue him. The detective (Louis Koo) in charge sees through Shun's scheme but decides to play along so as to capture his whole gang once and for all.

== Cast ==
- Zhao Wei as Dr. Tong Qian
- Louis Koo as Ken (Chief Inspector)
- Wallace Chung as Shun (Gangster)
- Lo Hoi-pang as Chung (Patient)
- Cheung Siu-fai as Dr. Fok
- Lam Suet as Fatty (Constable)
- Mimi Kung as Advance Practice Nurse
- Timmy Hung as Chak (Patient)
- Michael Tse as Gangster
- Raymond Wong as Gangster
- Jonathan Wong as Hung (Patient)
- Stephen Au as Tong (Sergeant)
- Mickey Chu (credited as Chu Kin-kwan) as Dr. Steven Chow
- Cheung Kwok-keung as Mr. Ng (Patient)
- Helen Tam (credited as Tam Yuk-ying) as Mrs. Ng (Visitor)
- Luvin Ho (credited as Ching Wai) as Ho (Senior Inspector)
- Sire Ma as Journalist
- Zhang Yaodong (credited as Teoh Yeow Tong) as Neurosurgery Student

== Production ==
Production for Three began in Guangzhou in March 2015 wrapped up on 24 July of the same year. The film was mainly shot in a hospital that was built by the props team.

== Reception ==
The film has grossed CN¥100.41 million in China. On review aggregator website Rotten Tomatoes, the film has a 91% "fresh" rating based on 23 reviews. Metacritic reports a 71 out of 100 rating based on 10 critics, indicating "generally favorable reviews".

== Awards and nominations ==
List of awards and nominations
Award	Category	Nominee	Result
53rd Golden Horse Awards	Best Director	Johnnie To	Nominated
53rd Golden Horse Awards	Best Original Film Score	Xavier Jamaux	Nominated
19th Shanghai International Film Festival; China Movie Channel Media Award	Best Actor	Wallace Chung	Won
8th Big Ben Awards - Golden Unicorn Award	Best Actress	Zhao Wei	Won
12th Asian Film Awards	Best Composer	Xavier Jamaux	Nominated
36th Hong Kong Film Awards	Best Director	Johnnie To	Nominated
36th Hong Kong Film Awards	Best Cinematography	Siu-Keung Cheng; Hung-Mo To	Nominated
13th Guangzhou Student Film Festival	Most Popular Director	Johnnie To	Won
13th Guangzhou Student Film Festival	Most Popular Actor	Wallace Chung	Won
