= The Stand-In (TV series) =

Chinese television series

The Stand-In (十月围城 Shíyuè Wéichéng, "October Siege") is a 2014 Chinese TV series, a spin-off following the success of the 2009 film Bodyguards and Assassins (also 十月围城 Shíyuè Wéichéng in Chinese). The series is directed by Ju Jueliang (zh:鞠觉亮).

== Cast ==
- Wallace Chung 鍾漢良
- Liu Xiaoxiao 劉小小
- Wu Gang 吳剛
- Ng Man-Tat 吳孟達
- Zhang Xiaolong 張曉龍
- Wang Zizi
- Yan Minqiu
- He Jiayi
- Hu Dong
- Zhang Haoxiang
- Lu Jiyi
- Bobo Gan
- Han Dong
- Jing Gangshan
- Liu Yidan

== Awards and nominations ==
Year	Award	Category	Nominated work	Result	Ref.
2014	6th China TV Drama Awards	Television Figure of the Year	Wallace Chung	Won	

== International broadcast ==
Country	Network(s)/Station(s)	Series premiere	Title
China	Shanghai TV	February 16-March 9, 2014 (Every day at 19:00, Two episodes were broadcast in the first two days, Starting on the 18th, three episodes will be broadcast)	十月围城 (电视剧) ( ; lit: )
China	AHTV	June 27, 2014-July 18, 2014 (Every day at 19:35)	十月围城 (电视剧) ( ; lit: )
China	Shenzhen TV	June 27, 2014-July 18, 2014 (Every day at 19:35)	十月围城 (电视剧) ( ; lit: )
China	Hubei TV	June 27, 2014-July 18, 2014 (Every day at 19:35)	十月围城 (电视剧) ( ; lit: )
China	GTV	June 27, 2014-July 18, 2014 (Every day at 19:35)	十月围城 (电视剧) ( ; lit: )
Malaysia	8TV	May 7, 2014-July 30, 2014 (Asian Select Monday to Friday 20:30)	十月围城 (电视剧) ( ; lit: )
Singapore	Hub VV Drama	October 11, 2014-May 2, 2015 (Saturday 08:15-10:00 and 19:45-21:30 (two episodes))	十月围城 (电视剧) ( ; lit: )
Taiwan	GTV1HD	October 8, 2014-November 12, 2014 (Monday to Friday 20:00-22:00)	十月围城 (电视剧) ( ; lit: )
Taiwan	CTV	January 24, 2015-April 26, 2015 (Saturday, Sunday 10:00-12:00)	十月围城 (电视剧) ( ; lit: )
Taiwan	TTV	July 6, 2015-July 20, 2015 15:10-16:05; July 21, 2015-July 22, 2015 15:35-16:30; July 23, 2015-September 16, 2015 15:20-16:25; September 17, 2015-October 1, 2015 15:00-16:00 (Monday to Thursday)	十月围城 (电视剧) ( ; lit: )
Hong Kong	HD Jade	March 14, 2015-May 29, 2015 (HD Theater Tuesday to Saturday 00:00-01:00 (for other replay times, please see here))	十月围城 (电视剧) ( ; lit: )
Hong Kong	TVB, TVB Jade	September 4, 2017-November 27, 2017 (Monday to Friday 10:30-11:30 (if the day is a public holiday), Broadcasting will be suspended on October 11, 12, 18, 27 and November 22)	十月围城 (电视剧) ( ; lit: )
Canada	Talentvision	2016 (Every Monday to Friday, Vancouver 2:00 PM, 8:30 PM, Toronto 5:00 PM, 11:30 PM)	The Stand-In ( ; lit: )
Thailand	Channel 9 MCOT HD (30)	February 14, 2019 – May 21, 2019 (Every Monday to Friday from 14.05 - 15.00)	องครักษ์พิทักษ์ซุนยัดเซ็น ( ; lit: )
Thailand	5HD1	September 11, 2020 - 30 October 30, 2020 (Every Monday to Friday from 14.00 - 15.00); November 2, 2020- (Every Monday to Thursday from 14.05 - 15.00) (Wednesday 25 November 2020: No Broadcasting) (Thursday 10 December 2020: No Broadcasting)	องครักษ์พิทักษ์ซุนยัดเซ็น ( ; lit: )
