= Sun Yi (actress) =

Chinese actress (born 1993)

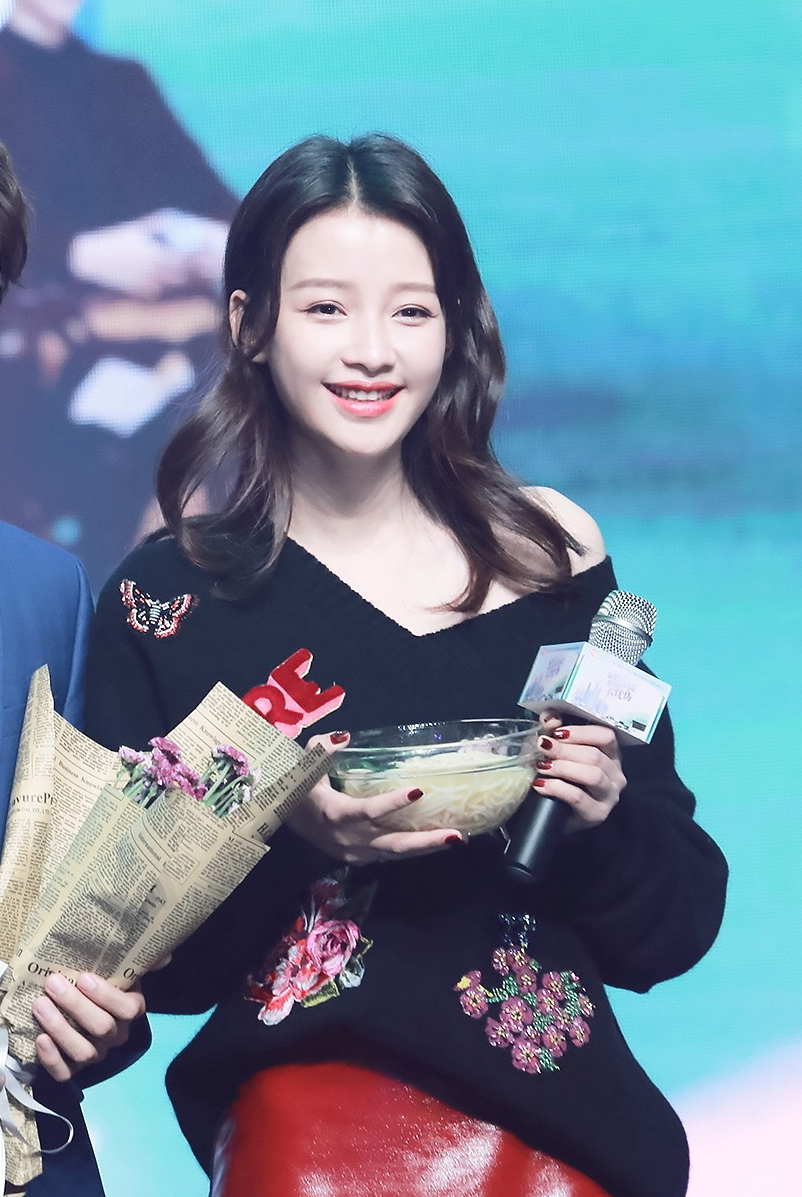
- Sun in September 2018
- Born: June 4, 1993 (age 33); Ji'an, Jilin, China
- Occupation: Actress
- Years active: 2014–present
- Spouse: Dong Zijian (m. 2017; div. 2022)
- Children: 1

Sun Yi (Chinese: 孙怡, born 4 June 1993) is a Chinese actress.

== Career ==
In 2014, Sun was picked from 1000 candidates to star in the art-house film Pleasure. Love.. The film premiered at the 2016 Sundance Film Festival in the World Dramatic competition. Sun won the Best Actress at the Asian New Talent Awards. She also won Best New Actress at the 11th Chinese Young Generation Film Forum.

In 2015, she starred in romantic comedy film My Original Dream which was screened in competition at the 28th Tokyo International Film Festival. The same year, she featured in the historical drama The Legend of Mi Yue.

Sun raised her profile after starring in the youth melodrama Promise of Migratory Birds. She gained widespread popularity with her role in Because of Meeting You, adapted from the 2014 Korean drama Jang Bo-ri is Here! alongside Deng Lun. The series placed number one throughout its broadcast and averaged ratings of 1.93%, becoming one of the highest rated drama of the year.

In 2018, Sun starred in the period romance drama Siege in Fog, and romance melodrama All Out of Love. The same year, she was cast in the romance drama Irreplaceable Love.

In 2019, Sun was cast in the legal romance drama Hello Prosecutor, a remake of the South Korean television series Prosecutor Princess.

In 2020, she was cast in the historical romance drama Twisted Fate of Love.

== Personal life ==
On May 7, 2017, Sun and actor Dong Zijian announced that they were getting married. The couple later welcomed a baby girl named Dong Dafu in September. They announced their divorce in August 2022.

== Filmography ==
=== Film ===
Year	English title	Chinese title	Role	Notes
2015	My Original Dream	我的青春期	Li Chunxia	
2016	Pleasure. Love.	男欢女爱	young Hu Yajie	
2016	I Love That Crazy Little Thing	那件疯狂的小事叫爱情	Wang Ruofei	Cameo

=== Television series ===
Year	English title	Chinese title	Role	Network	Notes
2015	Running After the Love	大猫儿追爱记	Tong Tong	Anhui TV, Jiangxi TV	
2015	Love Lot	爱情上上签	Wu Ping	Ningbo TV	
2015	The Legend of Mi Yue	芈月传	Mi Yao	Beijing TV, Dragon TV	
2016	Legend of Ban Shu	班淑传奇	Ah Cen	Tencent	
2016	Promise of Migratory Birds	十五年等待候鸟	Li Li	Hunan TV	
2017	Because of You	因为遇见你	Zhang Guoguo	Hunan TV	
2018	Siege in Fog	人生若如初相见	Qin Sang	Tencent	
2018	All Out of Love	凉生，我们可不可以不忧伤	Jiang Sheng	Hunan TV	
2019	Hurricane	暴风骤雨	Yu Hanqiu	Jiangsu Broadcasting Station	
2020	Twisted Fate of Love	今夕何夕	Dong Yue/Wen Xin	Tencent	
2020	Irreplaceable Love	与晨同光	Li Chuyao	Jiangsu TV	
2021	Be Together	我和我们在一起	Xia Yan	Mango TV	
2021	Hello Prosecutor	你好检察官	Jiang Xiaoxi	Zhejiang TV	
2022	The Wind Blows From Longxi	风起陇西	Di Yue	CCTV, iQIYI	
2023	New Vanity Fair	春日暖阳官	Ding Mo Mo	Youku	
2023	Pledge of Allegiance	山河之影	Shu Tang	iQIYI, Viki	
2023	I Love You	我知道我爱你	Xu Nuo	Tencent	
TBA	The Truth	风过留痕	Dan Qing	Tencent	

== Discography ==
Year	English title	Chinese title	Album	Notes
2018	"First Love, First Encounter"	初见初恋	Siege in Fog OST	
2018	"Waiting For Light"	等光	—N/a	
2020	"Mr. Right"	对的人		

== Awards and nominations ==
Year	Award	Category	Nominated work	Result	Ref.
2016	19th Asian New Talent Awards	Best Actress	Pleasure. Love.	Won	
2016	11th Chinese Young Generation Film Forum Awards	Best New Actress	Pleasure. Love.	Won	
2017	8th China TV Drama Awards	New Actress of the Year	Because of You	Won	
2018	25th Cosmo Beauty Ceremony	Beautiful Idol	—N/a	Won	
