= Too Late to Say I Love You =

Chinese television series

- Drama Poster
- Also known as: Endless Love; Too Late to Say Loving You
- Genre: Romance; Melodrama; Period; War
- Based on: Bi Zhou Chen by Fei Wo Si Cun
- Screenplay by: Zhou Yong
- Directed by: Zeng Lizhen
- Starring: Wallace Chung; Li Xiaoran
- Country of origin: China
- Original language: Mandarin
- No. of episodes: 36

Production
- Producer: Xu Jianing
- Running time: 45 minutes
- Production companies: Beijing Guangcai Century Media Limited; Hunan Tv&Broadcast Intermediary Co., Ltd.

Original release
- Network: Hubei Television
- Release: 30 August 2010 – 2010

Too Late to Say I Love You (Chinese: 来不及说我爱你) is a 2010 Chinese television series adapted from the novel Bi Zhou Chen (碧甃沉) by Fei Wo Si Cun. It stars Wallace Chung and Li Xiaoran. The series premiered on Hubei TV on August 30, 2010.

Chung and Li won Most Popular Couple award at the 2011 China TV Drama Awards.

== Synopsis ==
Yin Jingwan, a young woman from a wealthy merchant family, saved a young man on a train who was escaping from a rival warlord's manhunt. When she returned home, her parents betrothed her to a childhood friend, but her fiancé was put into prison in Chengzhou for smuggling firearms and illegal Western drugs. Jingwan decided to go to Chengzhou to rescue her fiancé, but she did not know that this trip would completely change her life.

Murong Feng, son of the most powerful northern warlord, rushed back to China from his studies in Russia after his father's assassination. Awaiting him in Chengzhou is one dangerous plot after another devised by his father's generals to thwart his succession to the northern territories. As Murong Feng succeeds in becoming the Military Governor of the North, he embarks on his next ambition to unify his country. Amid this furious military struggle, Murong Feng unexpectedly begins to harbor very strong feelings for an ordinary young woman from the South, Yin Jingwan. What will happen when his love for Jingwan brutally clashes with his political ambition?

== Cast ==
- Wallace Chung as Murong Feng
- Li Xiaoran as Yin Jingwan
- Qi Fang as Cheng Jinzhi
- Tan Kai as Xu Jianzhang
- Sun Wei as Cheng Xinzhi
- Kou Zhenhai as Yin Chufan
- Gua Ah-leh as Old Mrs. Xu
- Liu Dawei as Shen Jiaping
- Lu Yong as Cheng Siling
- Cheng Jiabin as Senior Xu
- Wang Lanyang as Mrs. Yin
- Zhu Wenxi as Murong Third Mistress
- Yao Gang as Xu Zhiping

== Soundtrack ==
Too Late to Say Loving You - Original Television Soundtrack (来不及说我爱你 电视剧原声音乐大碟)
No.	Title	Music	Length
1.	"I Think Too Much (是我在做多情种)" (Opening theme song)	Hu Yanglin	4:47
2.	"Too Late to Say I Love You (来不及说我爱你)" (Ending theme song)	Guo Jing
3.	"Can Only Love One Person in a Lifetime (一生只能爱一个)"	Hu Yanglin
4.	"Left Eye Smiles, Right Eye in Tears (左眼微笑右眼泪)"	Hu Yanglin
