= Golden Rooster Awards =

Chinese film awards

Golden Rooster Awards 金鸡奖
- Current: 39th Golden Rooster Awards
- The Golden Rooster Award
- Awarded for: Excellence in film
- Country: China
- Presented by: China Film Association
- First award: 1981

Golden Rooster Awards
- Traditional Chinese: 中國電影金雞獎
- Simplified Chinese: 中国电影金鸡奖
Transcriptions
Standard Mandarin
- Hanyu Pinyin: Zhōngguó Diànyǐng Jīnjī Jiǎng
Yue: Cantonese
- Yale Romanization: Jūnggwok Dihnyíng Gāmgāi Jéung
- Jyutping: Zung^{1}gwok^{3} Din^{6}jing^{2} Gam^{1}gai^{1} Zoeng^{2}

The Golden Rooster Awards (Chinese: 金鸡奖; pinyin: Jīnjī Jiǎng) are annual film awards given in mainland China. Established in 1981, the awards are co-sponsored by the China Film Association and the China Federation of Literary and Art Circles.

The name of the award came from the year of the Rooster in 1981. Award recipients receive a statuette in the shape of a golden rooster, and are selected by a jury of filmmakers, film experts, and film historians. The awards are the Chinese equivalent to the American Academy Awards.

Originally, Golden Roosters were only available to mainland Chinese nominees, but in 2005, the awards opened up the acting categories to actors from Taiwan, Hong Kong, and elsewhere in an effort to compete with Taiwan's Golden Horse Awards. Films in the past two years are eligible for the Golden Rooster awards since 2007.

The Golden Rooster and Hundred Flowers Awards have taken place on alternate years since 2005, with the Golden Rooster taking place on odd years. In 1992, the Golden Rooster and the Hundred Flowers Awards were combined into a single national festival.

== Ceremonies ==
Edition	Date	City
31st Golden Rooster Awards	September 16, 2017	Hohhot, Inner Mongolia, China
32nd Golden Rooster Awards	November 23, 2019	Xiamen, Fujian, China
33rd Golden Rooster Awards	November 28, 2020	Xiamen, Fujian, China
34th Golden Rooster Awards	December 30, 2021	Xiamen, Fujian, China
35th Golden Rooster Awards	November 12, 2022	Xiamen, Fujian, China
36th Golden Rooster Awards	November 4, 2023	Xiamen, Fujian, China
37th Golden Rooster Awards	November 16, 2024	Xiamen, Fujian, China
38th Golden Rooster Awards	November 15, 2025	Xiamen, Fujian, China
39th Golden Rooster Awards	November 10, 2026	Xiamen, Fujian, China

== Awards categories ==
- Best Picture (最佳故事片)
- Best Director (最佳导演)
- Best Actor (最佳男主角)
- Best Actress (最佳女主角)
- Best Supporting Actor (最佳男配角)
- Best Supporting Actress (最佳女配角)
- Best Writing (最佳编剧)
- Best Directorial Debut (最佳导演处女作)
- Best Cinematographer (最佳摄影)
- Best Editor
- Best Sound
- Best Art Director
- Best Score
- Best TV Film
- Best Documentary
- Best Animation (最佳美术片)
- Lifetime Achievement Award (终身成就奖)

== Award winners ==
Time	Year	Category	Award winners / winners
1	1981	Best Picture Best Director Best Writing Best Actor Best Actress	“Evening Rain”, “Legend of Tianyun Mountain” Xie Jin - “Legend of Tianyun Mountain” Ye Nan - “Evening Rain” N/A Zhang Yu - “Evening Rain”
2	1982	Best Picture Best Director Best Writing Best Actor Best Actress	“Neighbor” Cheng Yin - “The Xi'an Incident” Zhang Xian - “Corner Left Unnoticed by Love” Zhang Yan - “Laughs at Moon Bar” Li Xiuming - “Xu Mao and His Daughters”
3	1983	Best Picture Best Director Best Writing Best Actor Best Actress	“At Middle Age”, “Rickshaw Boy” Wu Yigong - “My Memories of Old Beijing” N/A N/A Pan Hong - “At Middle Age”, Siqin Gaowa - “Rickshaw Boy”
4	1984	Best Picture Best Director Best Writing Best Actor Best Actress	“Voice From Hometown” Tang Xiaodan - “Liao Zhongkai” N/A Dong Xingji - “Liao Zhongkai”, Yang Zaibao - “Blood is Always Hot” Gong Xue - “Under The Bridge”
5	1985	Best Picture Best Director Best Writing Best Actor Best Actress	“The Girl in Red” Ling Zifeng - “The Border Town” Li Zhun, Li Cunbao - “Wreaths at the Foot of the Mountain” Lu Xiaohe - “Wreaths at the Foot of the Mountain” Li Ling - “Girl from Mt. Huangshan”
6	1986	Best Picture Best Director Best Writing Best Actor Best Actress	“In The Wild Mountains” Yan Xueshu - “In The Wild Mountains” Cao Yu, Wan Fang - “Sunrise” Liu Zifeng - “The Black Cannon Incident” Yue Hong - “In The Wild Mountains”
7	1987	Best Picture Best Director Best Writing Best Actor Best Actress	“Hibiscus Town”, “Dr. Sun Yat-sen” Ding Yinnan - “Dr. Sun Yat-sen” Tian Junli, Fei Linjun - “The Bloody Battle of Taierzhuang” Liu Wenzhi - “Dr. Sun Yat-sen” Liu Xiaoqing - “Hibiscus Town”
8	1988	Best Picture Best Director Best Writing Best Actor Best Actress	“Old Well”, “Red Sorghum” Wu Tianming - “Old Well” Huang Shuqin, Li Ziyu, Song Guoxun - “Woman Demon Human” Zhang Yimou - “Old Well” Pan Hong - “Well”
9	1989	Best Picture Best Director Best Writing Best Actor Best Actress	N/A Wu Ziniu - “Evening Bell”, “Joyous Heroes”, “Between Life and Death” N/A Tao Zeru - “Evening Bell”, “Joyous Heroes”, Xie Yuan - “Chess King”, “Heavy Breathing” Xu Shouli - “Joyous Heroes”, “Between Life and Death”
10	1990	Best Picture Best Director Best Writing Best Actor Best Actress	“The Birth of New China” Li Qiankuan, Xiao Guiyun - “The Birth of New China”, Xie Tieli, Zhao Yun - A Dream of Red Mansions Zhang Tianmin, Zhang Xiaotian, Liu Xing, Guo Chen - “The Birth of New China” Lu Qi - “Baise Uprising” N/A
11	1991	Best Picture Best Director Best Writing Best Actor Best Actress	“Jiao Yulu” N/A N/A Li Xuejian - “Jiao Yulu” Xi Meijuan - “Leave Women the Truth”
12	1992	Best Picture Best Director Best Writing Best Actor Best Actress	“Decisive Engagement: The Liaoxi-Shenyang Campaign” Sun Zhou - “The True-Hearted”, Ensemble Directors - “Decisive Engagement: The Liaoxi-Shenyang Campaign” Huang Yazhou, Wang Tianyun - “The Creation of a World” Wang Tiecheng - “Zhou Enlai” Song Xiaoying - “Her Smile Through Candlelight”
13	1993	Best Picture Best Director Best Writing Best Actor Best Actress	“The Story of Qiu Ju” Xia Gang - “After Separation” Wang Xingdong - “The Scientist Jiang Zhuying” Ge You - “After Separation” Gong Li - “The Story of Qiu Ju”
14	1994	Best Picture Best Director Best Writing Best Actor Best Actress	“Country Teachers” He Ping - “Red Firecracker, Green Firecracker” Ju Sheng, Liu Xinglong, Bu Yangui - “Country Teachers” Li Baotian - “Country Teachers” Pan Hong - “Shanghai Fever”
15	1995	Best Picture Best Director Best Writing Best Actor Best Actress	“The Accused Uncle Shangang” Huang Jianxin, Yang Yazhou - “Back to Back, Face to Face” Bi Bicheng, Fan Yuan - “The Accused Uncle Shangang” Li Rentang - “The Accused Uncle Shangang” Ai Liya - “Ermo”
16	1996	Best Picture Best Director Best Writing Best Actor Best Actress	“Red Cherry” Wu Tianming - “The King of Masks” N/A Gao Ming - “Kong Fansen” Song Chunli - “Jiuxiang”
17	1997	Best Picture Best Director Best Writing Best Actor Best Actress	“The Opium War” Wei Lian - “The Big Change” Wang Xingdong - “The Days Without Lei Feng” Liu Peiqi - “The Days Without Lei Feng” Yu Hui - “Xi Lian”
18	1998	Best Picture Best Director Best Writing Best Actor Best Actress	“Settlement” Hu Bingliu - “Settlement”, Sai Fu, Mai Lisi - “Genghis Khan” Lu Zhuguo - “The Liberation of Southwest China” Feng Gong - “A Tree in House” Tao Hong - “Colors of the Blind”
19	1999	Best Picture Best Director Best Writing Best Actor Best Actress	“Postmen in the Mountains” Zhang Yimou - “Not One Less” Cao Wenxuan - “The Grass House” Teng Rujun - “Postmen in the Mountains” Ning Jing - “Lover's Grief over the Yellow River”
20	2000	Best Picture Best Director Best Writing Best Actor Best Actress	“Fatal Decision”, “Roaring Across the Horizon”, “The Road Home” Chen Guoxing - “Roaring Across the Horizon”, Zhang Yimou - “The Road Home” He Zizhuang, Song Jigao - “Fatal Decision” Chen Daoming - “My 1919” Gong Li - “Breaking the Silence”
21	2001	Best Picture Best Director Best Writing Best Actor Best Actress	“Mao Zedong in 1925” Huo Jianqi - “Love of Blueness” Wang Xiaotang, Wang Chen - “Fragrant Vows” Ge Zhijun - “Escort” Song Chunli - “To Be With You Forever”
22	2002	Best Picture Best Director Best Writing Best Actor Best Actress	“Pretty Big Feet”, “Charging Out Amazon” Chen Kaige - “Together”, Yang Yazhou - “Pretty Big Feet” Su Xiaowei - “Life Show” Ning Cai - “Heavenly Grassland” Ni Ping - “Pretty Big Feet”, Tao Hong - “Life Show”
23	2003	Best Picture Best Director Best Writing Best Actor Best Actress	“The River Wild”, “Nuan” Zhang Yimou - “Hero” Su Xiaowei - “Nuan” Xia Yu - “The Law of Romance” Yu Nan - “Jingzhe”
24	2004	Best Picture Best Director Best Writing Best Actor Best Actress	“Shanghai Story” Peng Xiaolian - “Shanghai Story” Zhao Dongling - “The Story of Xiao-Yan” Liu Ye - “The Foliage” Zheng Zhenyao - “Shanghai Story”, Zhang Ziyi - “Jasmine Women”
25	2005	Best Picture Best Director Best Writing Best Actor Best Actress	“On the Mountain of Tai Hang”, “Kekexili: Mountain Patrol” Ma Liwen - “You and Me” Liu Heng - “Zhang Side” Jackie Chan - “New Police Story” Jin Yaqin - “You and Me”
26	2007	Best Picture Best Director Best Writing Best Actor Best Actress	“The Knot” Qi Jian - “The Forest Ranger”, Yin Li - “The Knot” Tang Lai, Zhang Sitao, Zhang Chi, Hu Kun - “The Tokyo Trial” Fu Dalong - “The Forest Ranger” Carina Lau - “Curiosity Kills the Cat”, Yan Bingyan - “Teeth of Love”
27	2009	Best Picture Best Director Best Writing Best Actor Best Actress	“Assembly”, “Forever Enthralled” Feng Xiaogang - “Assembly” Jiang Haiyang, Gu Bai, Zong Fuxian - “Turning Point 1977” Wu Gang - “Iron Man” Jiang Wenli - “And the Spring Comes”, Zhou Xun - “The Equation of Love and Death”
28	2011	Best Picture Best Director Best Writing Best Actor Best Actress	“The Space Dream” Chen Li - “Love On Gallery Bridge” Cheng Xiaoling - “Sui Sui Qing Ming” Sun Chun - “Qiu Xi” Naren Hua - “Mother”
29	2013	Best Picture Best Director Best Writing Best Actor Best Actress	“The Story of Zhou Enlai”, “American Dreams in China” Peter Chan - “American Dreams in China” Huang Hong, Wang Jinming - “Fallen City” Zhang Guoli - “Back to 1942”, Huang Xiaoming - “American Dreams in China” Song Jia - “Falling Flowers”
30	2015	Best Picture Best Director Best Writing Best Actor Best Actress	“Wolf Totem” Tsui Hark - “The Taking of Tiger Mountain” Li Qiang - “The Golden Era” Zhang Hanyu - “The Taking of Tiger Mountain” Badema - “Norjmaa”
31	2017	Best Picture Best Director Best Writing Best Actor Best Actress	“Operation Mekong” Feng Xiaogang - “I Am Not Madame Bovary” Guan Hu, Dong Runnian - “Mr. Six” Deng Chao - “The Dead End” Fan Bingbing - “I Am Not Madame Bovary”
32	2019	Best Picture Best Director Best Writing Best Actor Best Actress	“The Wandering Earth” Dante Lam - “Operation Red Sea” Wang Xiaoshuai, Mei Ah - “So Long, My Son” Wang Jingchun - “So Long, My Son” Yong Mei - “So Long, My Son”
33	2020	Best Picture Best Director Best Writing Best Actor Best Actress	“Leap” Wang Rui - “Chaogtu with Sarula” Zhang Ji - “Leap” Huang Xiaoming - “The Bravest” Zhou Dongyu - “Better Days”
34	2021	Best Picture Best Director Best Writing Best Actor Best Actress	“Island Keeper” Zhang Yimou - “Cliff Walkers” Yu Xi, Huang Xin, Zhao Ningyu - “1921” Zhang Yi - “Cliff Walkers” Zhang Xiaofei - “Hi, Mom”
35	2022	Best Picture Best Director Best Writing Best Actor Best Actress	“The Battle at Lake Changjin” Chen Kaige, Tsui Hark, Dante Lam - “The Battle at Lake Changjin” Shao Yihui - “Myth of Love” Zhu Yilong - “Lighting Up the Stars” Xi Meijuan - “Song of Spring”
36	2023	Best Picture Best Director Best Writing Best Actor Best Actress	“Creation of the Gods I: Kingdom of Storms” Cheng Er - “Hidden Blade” Kong Dashan, Wang Yitong - “Journey to the West” Tony Leung - “Hidden Blade” He Saifei - “Off the Stage”
37	2024	Best Picture Best Director Best Writing Best Actor Best Actress	“Article 20” Chen Kaige - “The Volunteers: To the War” Han Yan, Li Fu - “Viva La Vida” Lei Jiayin - “Article 20” Li Gengxi - “Viva La Vida”
38	2025	Best Picture Best Director Best Writing Best Actor Best Actress	“Her Story” Chen Sicheng, Dai Mo - “Detective Chinatown 1900” Anselm Chan, Cheng Wai-kei - “The Last Dance” Jackson Yee - “Big World” Song Jia - “Her Story”
