= Golden Rooster Award for Best Actress =

Chinese Film Awards

Golden Rooster Awards for Best Actress
- Awarded for: Best Actress of the year
- Country: China
- Presented by: China Film Association; China Federation of Literary and Art Circles; Xiamen Municipal People's Government; 1905.com
- First award: 1981
- Final award: 2023
- Winner (2023): Gao Ye for Dead to Rights
- Website: Golden Rooster Awards

The Golden Rooster Award for Best Actress (中国电影金鸡奖最佳女主角) is the main category of Competition of Golden Rooster Awards, awarding actresses with outstanding performances in leading roles in cinema of China.

== Winners & nominees ==
‡	Indicates winning Hundred Flowers Award for Best Actress for the same role

=== 1980s ===
Year	Actress(es)	Film	Character
1981; 1st	Zhang Yu	Evening Rain	Liu Wenying
1981; 1st	Zhang Yu	Romance on Lushan Mountain ‡	Zhou Jun
1981; 1st	Tian Hua	In and Out of Court	Shang Qin
1981; 1st	Wang Fuli	Legend of Tianyun Mountain	Song Wei
1982; 2nd	Li Xiuming	Xu Mao and His Daughters ‡	Xu Xiuyun
1982; 2nd	Ren Yexiang	Longing for Home	Tian Cuicui
1982; 2nd	Zhang Yu	On a Small Street	Yu Zhen
1983; 3rd	Pan Hong (tie)	At Middle Age	Lu Wenting
1983; 3rd	Siqin Gaowa (tie)	Rickshaw Boy ‡	Hu Niu
1984; 4th	Gong Xue	Under the Bridge ‡	Qin Nan
1984; 4th	Li Ling	Ward 16	Chang Lin
1985; 5th	Li Ling	Girl from Huangshan Mountain	Gong Lingling
1985; 5th	Gu Yongfei	Thunderstorm	Fanyi
1986; 6th	Yue Hong	Wild Mountains	Guilan
1986; 6th	Fang Shu	Sunrise	Chen Bailu
1986; 6th	Xu Lei	Spring into Autumn	Zhou Lianghui
1986; 6th	Zhang Xiaolei	Xiangsi Woman's Hotel	Zhang Guanyin
1987; 7th	Liu Xiaoqing	Hibiscus Town ‡	Hu Yuyin
1987; 7th	Naren Hua	Married to a Child	Xiaoxiao
1988; 8th	Pan Hong	The Well	Xu Lisha
1988; 8th	Li Kechun	The Third Party	Sang Yuchen
1988; 8th	Liu Xiaoqing	Savage Land	Jinzi
1989; 9th	Xu Shouli	The Happy Hero & The Dead and the Living	Yusuan
1989; 9th	Wu Yujuan	Obsession	Qingqing

=== 1990s ===
Year	Actress(es)	Film	Character
1990	—N/a	—N/a	—N/a
1991; 11th	Xi Meijuan	A False Woman's True Love	Wang Yujuan
1991; 11th	Lü Liping	Unexpected Passion	Liang Xiaoqing
1991; 11th	Ma Xiaoqing	Good Morning, Beijing	Ai Hong
1992; 12th	Song Xiaoying	Her Smile Through the Candlelight	Wang Shuangling
1992; 12th	Ding Yi	Bell of Purity Temple	Aunt Yangjiao
1992; 12th	Zhao Lirong	The Spring Festival	mother
1993; 13th	Gong Li	The Story of Qiu Ju	Qiu Ju
1993; 13th	Xu Fan	After Separation	Lin Zhouyun
1994; 14th	Pan Hong	Shanghai Fever ‡	Fan Li
1994; 14th	Bai Han	Romance in Metropolitan Shanghai	Luo Naiqian
1994; 14th	Ning Jing	Red Firecracker, Green Firecracker	Chunzhi
1995; 15th	Ai Liya	Ermo	Ermo
1995; 15th	Pu Chaoying	Women Flowers	Shang Meiju
1995; 15th	Xu Fan	Gone Forever with My Love	Lin Gege
1996; 16th	Song Chunli	Jiuxiang	Jiuxiang
1996; 16th	Cao Cuifen	Orphan's Tears	Geng Ernu
1996; 16th	Guo Keyu	Red Cherry	Chuchu
1997; 17th	Yu Hui	Xilian	Xilian
1997; 17th	Gai Ke	After Divorce	Shi Hui
1997; 17th	Xi Meijuan	A Tree	Zhu Zhu
1998; 18th	Tao Hong (born 1972)	Colors of the Blind	Ding Lihua
1998; 18th	Ai Liya	Genghis Khan	Hoelun
1998; 18th	Pan Yu	Live in Peace and Contentment	Granny Axi
1999; 19th	Ning Jing	Lover's Grief over the Yellow River	An Jie
1999; 19th	Xu Fan	Be There or Be Square	Li Qing
1999; 19th	Yuan Quan	Once Upon a Time in Shanghai	Li Huirong

=== 2000s ===
Year	Actress(es)	Film	Character
2000; 20th	Gong Li	Breaking the Silence ‡	Sun Liying
2000; 20th	Tenzin Dolkar	Song of Tibet	Yeshe Dolma
2000; 20th	Zhang Ziyi	The Road Home	Zhao Di
2001; 21st	Song Chunli	To Be With You Forever	Cai Chang
2001; 21st	Wu Jing	Sunshine Days	Zhuo Liying
2001; 21st	Yuan Quan	A Love of Blueness	Liu Yun
2002; 22nd	Ni Ping (tie)	Pretty Big Feet	Zhang Meili
2002; 22nd	Tao Hong (born 1969) (tie)	Life Show	Lai Shuangyang
2002; 22nd	Naren Hua	Heavenly Grassland	Burmaa
2003; 23rd	Yu Nan	Jingzhe	Guan Ermei
2003; 23rd	Jiang Wenli	My Bitter Sweet Taiwan	mother
2003; 23rd	Li Jia	Nuan	Nuan
2004; 24th	Zhang Ziyi (tie)	Jasmine Women	Mo
2004; 24th	Zheng Zhenyao (tie)	Shanghai Story	mother
2004; 24th	Jiang Qinqin	My Sister's Dictionary	Niu Hongmei
2004; 24th	Tao Hong (born 1969)	Taekwondo	Liu Li
2005; 25th	Jin Yaqin	You and Me	grandma
2005; 25th	Li Bingbing	Waiting Alone	Liu Rong
2005; 25th	Mei Ting	Aspirin	Wen Jing
2005; 25th	Zhang Jingchu	Huayao Bride in Shangri-la	Fengmei
2007; 26th	Carina Lau (tie)	Curiosity Kills the Cat	Qianyu
2007; 26th	Yan Bingyan (tie)	Teeth of Love	Qian Yehong
2007; 26th	Li Bingbing	The Knot	Wang Jindi
2007; 26th	Rene Liu	Kidnap	Ho Yuan-chun
2007; 26th	Zhu Yuanyuan	The Forest Ranger	Taohua
2009; 27th	Jiang Wenli (tie)	And the Spring Comes	Wang Cailing
2009; 27th	Zhou Xun (tie)	The Equation of Love and Death	Li Mi
2009; 27th	Helen Yao	Blossom	Yueming
2009; 27th	Zhang Ziyi	Forever Enthralled	Meng Xiaodong
2009; 27th	Zhao Wei	Painted Skin	Peirong

=== 2010s ===
Year	Actress(es)	Film	Character
2011; 28th	Naren Hua	Mother	Tsetsegmaa
2011; 28th	Lü Liping	City Monkey	Luo Sufang
2011; 28th	Qian Peiyi	Eternal Watch	Amin
2011; 28th	Qin Hailu	The Piano in a Factory	Shuxian
2011; 28th	Xu Fan	Aftershock	Li Yuanni
2011; 28th	Yan Bingyan	Close to Me	Xue Ziying
2013; 29th	Song Jia	Falling Flowers	Xiao Hong
2013; 29th	Liang Jing	Son of the Stars	Liang Zhengzheng
2013; 29th	Yan Bingyan	Feng Shui	Li Baoli
2013; 29th	Yang Zishan	So Young	Zheng Wei
2013; 29th	Zhang Ziyi	The Grandmaster	Gong Er
2015; 30th	Badema	Norjmaa	Norjmaa
2015; 30th	Lü Zhong	Red Amnesia	Deng Meijuan
2015; 30th	Zhao Wei	Dearest	Li Hongqin
2015; 30th	Tang Wei	The Golden Era	Xiao Hong
2015; 30th	Xu Fan	When a Peking Family Meets Aupair	Wen Juan
2017; 31st	Fan Bingbing	I Am Not Madame Bovary	Li Xuelian
2017; 31st	Bai Baihe	Monster Hunt	Huo Xiaolan
2017; 31st	Yan Ni	Relocate	Liu Chunyan
2017; 31st	Song Jia	When Larry Met Mary	Ma Li
2017; 31st	Zhou Dongyu	Soul Mate	An Sheng
2019; 32nd	Yong Mei	So Long, My Son	Wang Liyun
2019; 32nd	Bai Baihe	A City Called Macau	Mei Xiao'ou
2019; 32nd	Yao Chen	Send Me to the Clouds	Sheng Nan
2019; 32nd	Ma Yili	Lost, Found	Li Jie
2019; 32nd	Zhou Dongyu	Us and Them	Fang Xiaoxiao
2019; 32nd	Zhao Xiaoli	To Live to Sing	manager

=== 2020s ===
Year	Actress(es)	Film	Character
2020; 33rd	Zhou Dongyu ‡	Better Days‡	Chen Nian
2020; 33rd	Tan Zhuo	Sheep Without a Shepherd	Ayu
2020; 33rd	Zhu Xijuan	The Empty Nest	Zhao Yimei
2020; 33rd	Ada Liu	My Dear Liar	Yue Miaomiao
2020; 33rd	Ren Suxi	Almost a Comedy	Momo
2021; 34th	Zhang Xiaofei	Hi, Mom	Li Huanying
2021; 34th	Liu Mintao	Let Life Be Beautiful	Zhou Lan
2021; 34th	Zhang Zifeng	Sister	An Ran
2021; 34th	Liu Haocun	A Little Red Flower	Ma Xiaoyuan
2022; 35th	Xi Meijuan	Song of Spring	Feng Jizhen
2022; 35th	Ni Ni	Yanagawa	Ah Chuan
2022; 35th	Louise Wong	Anita	Anita Mui
2022; 35th	Yang Enyou	Lighting Up the Stars	Wu Xiaowen
2022; 35th	Yangshik Tso	Black Tent	Yang Jin
2023; 36th	He Saifei	Off the Stage	teacher Qi
2023; 36th	Kara Wai	Love Never Ends	Li Huiru
2023; 36th	Yan Ni	Heart's Motive	Jin Ximei
2023; 36th	Yin Tao	Home Coming	Bai Hua
2023; 36th	Huang Yao	The Shadowless Tower	Ouyang Wenhui
2024; 37th	Li Gengxi	Viva La Vida	Ling Min
2024; 37th	Ma Li	Article 20	Li Maojuan
2024; 37th	Japal Tso	Life of Luosang	Yangjin
2024; 37th	Zhang Zifeng	Moonstruck	Lin Xiushan
2024; 37th	Zhou Meijun	The Midsummer's Voice	Shi Jiahui
2024; 37th	Ge Zhaomei	Gone with the Boat	Zhou Jin
2025; 38th	Song Jia	Her Story	Wang Tiemei
2025; 38th	Michelle Wai	The Last Dance	Guo Wenyue
2025; 38th	Yong Mei	Like A Rolling Stone	Li Hong
2025; 38th	Duan Aojuan	The Lost Daughter	Liu Suisui
2025; 38th	Xu Haipeng	Fate of the Moonlight	Xia Chan
2026; 39th	Gao Ye	Dead to Rights	Lin Yuxiu
2026; 39th	Li Sitong	Dear You	Chia Lam Gi
2026; 39th	Song Jia	The Volunteers: Peace at Last	Lin Yueming
2026; 39th	Zhang Zifeng	The Shadow's Edge	He Qiuguo
2026; 39th	Chen Lijun	Blades of the Guardians	Ayuya

== Records ==
- 3 wins: Pan Hong (including 1 tied win)
- 2 wins: Gong Li, Song Chunli, Xi Meijuan, Song Jia
- 5 nominations: Xu Fan (0 win)
- 4 nominations: Zhang Ziyi (1 tied win), Song Jia (2 win)
- 3 nominations: Zhou Dongyu ( 1 win), Xi Meijuan (2 win), Naren Hua (1 win), Yan Bingyan (1 tied win), Zhang Zifeng (0 win)
- Oldest winner: Jin Yaqin (80)
- Youngest winner: Li Gengxi (24)
