= Shanghai Film Critics Award for Best Director =

Annual Chinese film award

Best Director is one of the main category of Shanghai Film Critics Awards.

== Winners list ==
Year	Winner	For
2010	Gao Qunshu; Chen Kuo-fu	Messages
2008	Feng Xiaogang	Assembly
2007	Yin Li	The Knot
2006	Peter Chan	Perhaps Love
2005	Lu Chuan	Mountain Patrol
2004	Peng Xiaolian	Shanghai Story
2002	Saifu; Mailisi	Heavenly Grassland
2000	Xie Fei	Song of Tibet
1999	Zhang Yimou	Not One Less
1999	Feng Xiaoning	The Legend of the Yellow River
1998	Li Shaohong	The Red Suit
1997	Feng Xiaoning	A Tale of the Sacred Mountain
1996	Xie Fei	A Mongolian Tale
1996	Huo Jianqi	Winner
1995	Zhou Xiaowen	Ermo
1994	Li Qiankuan; Xiao Guiyun	Chongqing Negotiation
