= 7th Golden Rooster Awards =

1987 Chinese film awards ceremony

The 7th Golden Rooster Awards honoring the best in mainland China film of 1987, was given in Beijing.

== Winners & Nominees ==
Best Film	Best Director
Hibiscus Town; Dr. Sun Yat-sen; Battle of Taierzhuang	Ding Yinnan－Dr. Sun Yat-sen; Xie Jin－Hibiscus Town; Wei Lian－The Lives They Left Behind
Best Children Film	Best Writing
My classmates and I film	Tian Junli/Fei Linjun－Battle of Taierzhuang; Liu Guoqing－T省的八四、八五年; Ah Cheng/Xie Jin－Hibiscus Town
Best Actor	Best Actress
Liu Wenzhi－Dr. Sun Yat-sen; Jiang Wen－The Last Empress/Hibiscus Town; Shao Ronglai－Battle of Taierzhuang	Liu Xiaoqing－Hibiscus Town; Naren Hua－A Girl from Hunan
Best Supporting Actor	Best Supporting Actress
N/A; Zheng Zaishi－Hibiscus Town; He Haiquan－Clash of the Warlods; Zhai Junjie－Battle of Taierzhuang	Xu Ning－Hibiscus Town; Ding Jiali－The First Woman in the Forests
Best Chinese Opera Film	Best Documentary
N/A	一瞬与十年; 阳早与寒春; 广州街巷
Best Animation	Best Popular Science Film
超级肥皂; 巧在七中; 不怕冷的大衣	鹗; 回声; 曾侯乙编钟; 摇篮——人造卵与赤眼蜂
Best Cinematography	Best Art Direction
Dr. Sun Yat-sen－Hong Yong/Wang Hengli; A Girl from Hunan－Fu Jingsheng	Hibiscus Town－Jin Qifen; Dr. Sun Yat-sen－Min Zongsi
Best Music	Best Sound Recording
Dr. Sun Yat-sen－Shi Wanchun; The Lives They Left Behind－Zhai Xiaosong/Liu Suola; Hibiscus Town－Ge Yan	The First Woman in the Forests－来启箴、吴凌; Dr. Sun Yat-sen－Deng Qinghua/Huang Mingguang; The Last Sun－Lu Jiajin
Best Editing	Best Property
Dr. Sun Yat-sen－Feng Huilin/Yan Xiuying; T省的八四、八五年－Zhou Xiajuan; The Lives They Left Behind－Lu Chongzeng	Dr. Sun Yat-sen－Tian Shikai/Huang Xiaoming/Lin Hongtian; Hibiscus Town－Xu Guoliang; Clash of the Warlods－Bai Chuntao; The Last Emperor－Yang Guozhi/Cui Tian
Best Costume	Best Make Up
Dr. Sun Yat-sen－Ren Fengyi/Wang Jizhu	Battle of Taierzhuang－Yan Bijun/Zhao Zhimin
Best Stunt	最佳烟火
N/A	Battle of Taierzhuang－Yu Ze/Liu Huan; Dr. Sun Yat-sen－Peng Fuchu/Li Guoliang; The Lives They Left Behind－Shan Guotai/Yang Shunliang
Best Lighting	
N/A; Dr. Sun Yat-sen－Li Wen; 错位－Zhao Beiguang	

== Special Award ==
- Special Jury Award
  - Film : The Last Frenzy
  - Comedy: 买买提外传
  - Director: Chen Kaige（King of The Children）
  - Actor: Liu Qiong（Death and The Maiden）
