= China Film Performance Art Academy =

Professional organization

Chinese Film Performance Art Academy
- Founded: 1985; 41 years ago
- Location: China
- Website: www.1985byxh.com

Chinese Film Performance Art Academy (simplified Chinese: 中国电影表演艺术学会; traditional Chinese: 中國電影表演藝術學會; pinyin: Zhōngguó Diànyǐng Biǎoyǎn Yíshǜ Xuéhuì), founded in January 1985, is a professional organization of Chinese actors.

== Awards ==
Since 1985, the academy has bi-annually awarded the Golden Phoenix Awards.

=== The "100 outstanding actors in 100 years of Chinese cinema" ===
The Cina Film Performance Art Academy listed the "100 outstanding actors in 100 years of Chinese cinema" (Chinese: 中国电影百年百位优秀演员; pinyin: Zhōngguó diànyǐng bǎinián bǎi wèi yōuxiù yǎnyuán), for the 100th anniversary of Chinese film industry in 2005. The list was officially announced at the 14th Golden Rooster and Hundred Flowers Film Festival (Chinese: 金雞百花電影節; pinyin: Jīnjī bǎihuā diànyǐng jié) in Sanya on 12 November 2005.

==== 1905-1949 ====
Shangguan Yunzhu, Yu Yang, Yu Lan, Wang Renmei, Wang Danfeng, Feng Zhe, Tian Fang, Bai Yang, Shi Hui, Liu Qiong, Sun Daolin, Ruan Lingyu, Wu Yin, Ng Cho-Fan, Zhang Ping, Zhang Ruifang, Li Wei, Chen Qiang, Zhou Xuan, Jin Shan, Jin Yan, Hu Die, Zhao Dan, Xiang Kun, Qin Yi, Yuan Muzhi, Tao Jin, Huang Zongying, Shu Shi, Shu Xiuwen, Xie Tian, Lan Ma, Bao Fang, Li Lili, Wei Heling.

==== 1949-1976 ====
Yu Shizhi, Wang Xingang, Wang Yumei, Wang Xiaotang, Wang Fuli, Lisa Lu, Gua Ah-leh, Tian Hua, Zhong Xinghuo, Liu Xiaoqing, Jackie Chan, Zhang Liang, Zhang Yu, Sylvia Chang, Bruce Lee, Li Rentang, Li Moran, Yang Zaibao, Chow Yun-fat, Pang Xueqin, Brigitte Lin, Sihung Lung, Ko Chun-hsiung, Zhu Xijuan, Zhao Ziyue, Zhao Lirong, Tang Guoqiang, Xia Meng, Chin Han, Guo Zhenqing, Tao Yuling, Cui Wei, Xie Fang, Pan Hong.

==== 1976-2004 ====
Wang Zhiwen, Wang Tiecheng, Ning Jing, Liu Peiqi, Andy Lau, Lü Liping, Gong Li, Zhu Xu, Song Chunli, Zhang Fengyi, Leslie Cheung, Maggie Cheung, Jet Li, Li Baotian, Lee Li-chun, Li Xuejian, Joan Chen, Chen Peisi, Chen Baoguo, Chen Daoming, Stephen Chow, Zheng Zhenyao, Jiang Wen, Xi Meijuan, Tony Leung Ka-fai, Tony Leung Chiu-wai, Anita Mui, Zhang Ziyi, Siqin Gaowa, Ge You, Jiang Wenli, Pu Cunxin.

== Presidents ==
- 2007-now: Tang Guoqiang
  - Vice-president: Zhao Wei, Zhang Guoli, Wang Fuli
- 2000-2006: Yu Yang
  - Vice-president: Tang Guoqiang, Pan Hong, Wang Jinsong
