= Naren Hua =

Chinese actress (born 1962)

- Born: 17 November 1962 (age 64); Xilingol League, Inner Mongolia, China
- Other names: Na Renhua, Na Ren-Hua
- Occupation: actress
- Years active: 1976-present
- Spouse: Ning Cai
- Awards: Golden Rooster – Best Actress; 2011 Mother

Naren Hua (born 17 November 1962) is a Chinese film and television actress of Mongolian ethnicity.

== Name ==
Her name is derived from the Mongolian word for sunflower (ᠨᠠᡵᠠᠨ
ᡨᠰᡝᡨᠰᡝᡤ наран цэцэг naran tsetseg – "sun", Mongolian: naran; "flower", Mongolian: tsetseg, Chinese: 花, pinyin: huā). It is sometimes romanised as Na Renhua or Na Ren-Hua.

== Early life ==
Naren Hua was born on November 17, 1962, in Xilingol League, Inner Mongolia, China. She once lived in London and Hong Kong.

== Career ==
Naren Hua began her film career in 1976 in Zhan Di Huang Hua.

In 1986 she played Xiao Xiao in Xie Fei's A Girl from Hunan, which was screened in the Un Certain Regard section at the 1987 Cannes Film Festival, and was one of the first mainland Chinese films to be commercially screened in the United States. The film is based on a 1929 short-story, Xiao Xiao (or Hsiao Hsiao), by author Shen Congwen. A Girl from Hunan tells the story of a willful young girl (initially played by Lin Qing and played as an adult by Naren Hua) who, at the start of the film, is about to enter into an arranged marriage with a two-year-old child, Chun Guan. Xiao Xiao, the girl in question, is only twelve. She lets herself be seduced by a farmhand and soon finds herself pregnant. Knowing that the traditional village still executes women for adultery, Xiao Xiao is desperate to abort the baby but fails to accomplish her goal.

In 1995 she was again directed by Xie Fei in A Mongolian Tale, an adaptation of Zhang Chengzhi's novel Black Steed, which was positively received, being noted both for its performances and settings. The movie had its premiere at the Montreal World Film Festival.

In 2002 she had the leading role in Heavenly Grassland. The film tells about a young Han Chinese boy, Tiger, who is adopted by a family living in the steppes of Inner Mongolia. The boy's father asks a man named Shergan to look after his child while in prison. Shergan keeps his word and brings the boy to Mongolia, where he shares his yurt with his ex-wife Baruma, played by Naren Hua. The boy is at first shocked and repelled by the way of life of the people there, but in time learns to love his new homeland. The movie won Best Photography Award at the Golden Rooster Awards. Her performance was particularly praised and won Nare Hua several accolades, including the Shanghai Film Critics Awards for Best Actress.

In 2010 she had the leading role in Mother, also known as My Mongolian Mother (Chinese: E ji). The film, based on a true story, tells about two Chinese children transplanted in Mongolia, where they are adopted by Qiqigema Erji (Naren Hua) against the wishes of her husband, and raised as nomads. Twenty years later one of the children knows about his biological parents and leaves for Shanghai. The other child also finally meets his biological parents, and is then faced with a choice. Naren Hua won the Best Actress Award at the 28th Golden Rooster Awards for her performance in this movie.

In 2017 she had a supporting role in Li Ruijun's Walking Past the Future. In 2019 she played Juimei in A Dog Barking at the Moon. The movie, which won the award for Best First Feature Film at the Inside Out Film and Video Festival and the Teddy Award at the 69th Berlin International Film Festival for its LGBT topics, tells about a pregnant daughter who is caught between her homosexual father and "unmitigated termagant" mother (Naren Hua), who reverses on her daughter all her anger, whose chief cause is her father's homosexuality. Her performance in this movie was said to carry the "film's sometimes outrageous narrative throughout."

== Filmography ==
Year	Title	Director	Role	Notes
1976	Zhan Di Huang Hua	Ma Erlu	grand daughter	
1979	Ru Yan Fei	Sun Jing	Shang Xiaoli	
1986	A Girl from Hunan	Xie Fei/Wu Lan	Xiaoxiao	Golden Phoenix Award Society Award; Nominated - Golden Rooster Award for Best Actress
1995	A Mongolian Tale	Xie Fei	Someyer	
2002	Heavenly Grassland	Sai Fu/Mai Lisi	Baorima	Golden Phoenix Award Society Award; Shanghai Film Critics Award for Best Actress; Nominated - Golden Rooster Award for Best Actress; Nominated - Huabiao Award for Outstanding Actress
2005	The Monsoon Horse	Ning Cai	Yingjidema	Nominated - Huabiao Award for Outstanding Actress
2005	Between Life and Death (2005 film)	Zhou Youchao	Xie Li	Nominated - Hundred Flowers Award for Best Actress
2010	My Mongolian Mother (credited as Na Renhua)	Ning Cai		Golden Rooster Award for Best Actress; Huabiao Award for Outstanding Actress
2015	Qi Gong (The Calligraphy Master)			
2019	A Dog Barking at the Moon	Juimei		

== Awards and nominations ==
Year	Award	Category	Project	Result
1986	Golden Rooster Awards	Best Actress	A Girl from Hunan	Nominated
2002	Golden Rooster Awards	Best Actress	Heavenly Grassland	Nominated
2011	Golden Rooster Awards	Best Actress	My Mongolian Mother	Won
2002	Huabiao Awards	Outstanding Actress	Heavenly Grassland	Nominated
2005	Huabiao Awards	Outstanding Actress	Season of the Horse	Nominated
2011	Huabiao Awards	Outstanding Actress	My Mongolian Mother	Won
2002	Shanghai Film Critics Awards	Best Actress	Heavenly Grassland	Won
1987	Golden Phoenix Awards	Society Award	A Girl from Hunan	Won
2003	Golden Phoenix Awards	Society Award	Heavenly Grassland	Won
2006	Hundred Flowers Awards	Best Actress	Life and Death of Niu Yuru	Nominated
1988	Shanghai Film Studio Xiaobaihua Award	Best Actress	Zhanzheng rang neren zou kai	Won
2002	Chinese Minority Horse Award	Best Actress	Heavenly Grassland	Won
2004	China Children's Film Awards	Outstanding Adult Actor	Paper Airplane	Won
