= 8th Golden Rooster Awards =

1988 Chinese film awards ceremony

The 8th Golden Rooster Awards honoring the best in film of 1988, was given in Shenzhen, September 2, 1988.

== Winners & Nominees ==
Best Film	Best Director
Old Well; Red Sorghum; 人饭矸情; King of the Children	Wu Tianming－Old Well; Zhang Yimou－Red Sorghum; Huang Shuqin－Ghost Love; Wang Yan/Yang Lanru－女人国的污染报告
Best Children Film	Best Writing
N/A	Huang Shuqin/Li Ziyu/Song Guoxun－Ghost Love; Zheng Yi－Old Well
Best Actor	Best Actress
Zhang Yimou－Old Well; Jiang Wen－Red Sorghum; Liu Wei－The Hero in Northeast	Pan Hong－Well; Li Kechun－谁是第三者; Liu Xiaoqing－原野
Best Supporting Actor	Best Supporting Actress
Li Baotian－Ghost Love; Xie Yan－Old Well; Niu Xingli－Old Well	Lü Liping－Old Well; Song Chunli－鸳鸯楼; Song Xiaoying－鸳鸯楼; Zhang Min－午夜两点
Best Chinese Opera Film	Best Documentary
N/A	N/A; 巴金; 一和启示; 蔡元培生平
Best Animation	Best Popular Science Film
N/A; 选美记; 鹰	轰击原子核的大炮——粒子加速器; 动物的眼睛
Best Cinematography	Best Art Direction
Red Sorghum/King of the Children－Gu Chang Wei; 八女投江－Yang Guangyuan/Sang Hua; Death and The Maiden－Cao Zuobin; 给咖啡加点糖－Zheng Hua/Wang Suiguang	King of the Children－Ren Shaohua; Red Sorghum－Yang Guang; Two Dowagers－Ju Lutian; Ghost Love－Zheng Changming
Best Music	Best Sound Recording
Red Sorghum－Zhao Jiping; Ghost Love－Yang Yu	Red Sorghum－Gu Changning; 给咖啡加点糖－Tao Jing/Gu Changning; 鸳鸯楼－Zhang Ruikun/Li Bojiang
Best Editing	Best Property
山雀儿－Wang Daru; Old Well－Chen Dali; Ghost Love－Liu Jialin	N/A; 苏禄国王和中国皇帝－Ma Qiang

== Special Award ==
- Special Jury Award
  - Thriller: The Last Frenzy
  - Comedy: 买买提外传
  - Director: Chen Kaige（King of the Children）
  - Actor: Liu Qiong（Death and the Maiden）
