= 6th Golden Rooster Awards =

1986 Chinese film awards ceremony

The 6th Golden Rooster Awards honoring the best in film of 1986, was given in Beijing.

== Winners & Nominees ==
Best Film	Best Director
In the Wild Mountains; Sunrise; The Black Cannon Incident; Swan Song; Autumn Spring	Yan Xueshu－In the Wild Mountains; Huang Jianxin－The Black Cannon Incident; Bai Chen－Autumn Spring; Zhang Zeming－Swan Song
Best Children Film	Best Writing
Childhood of Peng Dehuai	Cao Yu/Wan Fang－Sunrise; Zhang Zeming－Swan Song; Yan Xueshu/Zhu Zi－In the Wild Mountains
Best Actor	Best Actress
Liu Zifeng－The Black Cannon Incident; Zhu Xu－A narrow lane celebrity; Kong Xianzhu－Swan Song; Tu Gongyi－钱这个东西......	Yue Hong－In the Wild Mountains; Xu Lei－Autumn Spring; Zhang Xiaolei－The Yearning-girl Inn; Fang Shu－Sunrise
Best Supporting Actor	Best Supporting Actress
Xin Ming－In the Wild Mountains; Yan Xiang－Sunrise	Wang Fuli－Sunrise
Best Chinese Opera Film	Best Documentary
N/A	抗日烽火; 手; 蓝天畅想曲; 南极，我们来了
Best Animation	Best Popular Science Film
The Monkey King Conquers the Demon; 草人; 夹子救鹿	崛起的第三金属——钛; 裸小鼠与肿瘤研究; 移核鱼
Best Cinematography	Best Art Direction
Swan Song－Zheng Kangzhen/Zhao Xiaoshi; A Good Woman－Yun Wenyao	Swan Song－Zhang Jingwen/Peng Jun; The Black Cannon Incident－Liu Yichuan
Best Music	Best Sound Recording
N/A; Sacrificed Youth－Qu Xiaosong/Liu Suola; A Good Woman－Shi Wanchun	In the Wild Mountains－Li Lanhua; A Good Woman－Zheng Chunyu; The Phantom Lover－Ren Daming
Best Editing	Best Property
N/A; 蓝鲸紧急出动－Wang Daru; 峡江疑影－Zhang Jing	N/A
Best Costume	Best Make Up
In the Wild Mountains－Ma Liping; Anecdote of State Yue－Shuai Furong; 流亡大学－Ma Mingxiang/Zhang Jufang	N/A
Best Stunt	Best Lighting
N/A	N/A

== Special Award ==
- Special Jury Award
  - Film: 咱们的退伍兵/迷人的乐队
  - Director: Wang Ping（Revolutionary Sonata of China）
