= 33rd Golden Rooster Awards =

2020 Chinese film awards ceremony

- Date: November 28, 2020
- Site: Xiamen International Conference & Exhibition Center; Xiamen, China
- Organized by: China Film Association

Highlights
- Best Feature Film: Leap
- Best Direction: Wang Rui; Chaogtu with Sarula
- Best Actor: Huang Xiaoming; The Bravest
- Best Actress: Zhou Dongyu; Better Days

Television coverage
- Network: CCTV

The 33rd Golden Rooster Awards honoring best Chinese language films which presented during 2019–20. The award ceremony was held in Xiamen, China, and broadcast by CCTV-6.

== Winners and nominees ==
Best Picture	Best Director
Leap; Better Days; Chaogtu with Sarula; My People, My Country; Spring Tide; Sheep Without a Shepherd	Wang Rui–Chaogtu with Sarula
Best Directorial Debut	Best Low-budget Feature
Shen Ao–My Dear Liar	My Himalayas
Best Writing	Best Editing
Zhang Ji–Leap	Zhu Liyun–Enter the Forbidden City
Best Actor	Best Actress
Huang Xiaoming–The Bravest	Zhou Dongyu–Better Days
Best Supporting Actor	Best Supporting Actress
Yin Xiaotian–The Bravest	Yuan Quan–The Captain
Best Cinematography	Best Art Direction
Zhao Xiaoshi–Leap	Song Jun, Dong Zhiliang & Guo Zhongshan–Liberation
Best Music	Best Sound Recording
Vacant	Wu Jiang–Only Cloud Knows
Best Animated Feature	Best Children's Film
Ne Zha	Starry Road
Best Chinese Opera Film	Best Documentary
The height of the early Tang Dynasty	Like the Dyer's Hand
