= 4th Golden Rooster Awards =

1984 film awards

The 4th Golden Rooster Award honoring the best in film of 1984, was given in Jinan, Shandong Province, June 2, 1984.

== Winners and Nominees ==
Best Film	Best Director
Voice from Hometown; The Devoted Soldier; Liao Zhongkai; Ward 16; Our Niu Baisui	Tang Xiaodan－Liao Zhongkai; Hu Bingliu－Voice from Hometown; Zhao Huanzhang－Our Niu Baisui; Wen Yan－血，总是热的
Best Actor	Best Actress
Dong Xingji－Liao Zhongkai; Yang Zaibao－血，总是热的; Li Wei－River Without Buoys	Gong Xue－Under the Bridge; Li Ling－Ward 16
Best Supporting Actor	Best Supporting Actress
Yu Shizhi－A Revolutionary; Wei Beiyuan－Voice from Hometown; Hu Hao－The Land Of Rebirth; Chen Peisi－Sunset Street	Song Xiaoying－Ward 16; Ding Yi－Our Niu Baisui; Wang Fuli－Our Niu Baisui
Best Writing	Best Stunt
N/A; Lu Yanzhou－Liao Zhongkai	The Mountain Of Fire－Tao Shigong/Ji Jingchun/Wang Dayu/Dong Zhensheng/Cai Ruzhi/Wei Tingfu
Best Chinese Opera Film	Best Documentary
N/A	我们看到的日本; 春风从这里吹起; 夺标
Best Animation	Best Popular Science Film
鹬蚌相争; 兔送信	灰喜鹊; 黄河与森林; 叶子; 拱的建筑; 消灭野鼠
Best Cinematography	Best Art Direction
The Land Of Rebirth－Yang Guangyuan; Our Field－Meng Qingpeng/Gan Quan; Girl Students Dormitory－Zhao Junhong	Li Bing－Wang Xingwen; The Land Of Rebirth－Fei Lanxin
Best Music	Best Sound Recording
N/A; The Devoted Soldier－Gong Zhiwei	The Land Of Rebirth－Shi Pingyi
Best Editing	Best Property
N/A; Wudang－Mao Li; Liao Zhongkai－Lan Weijie/Cai Jingyi	A Revolutionary－Xu Guoliang; Li Bing－Sun Guizhong/He Xucheng
Best Custome	Best Make Up
The Land Of Rebirth－Fei Lanxin/Zhu Fengtang/Li Qin; Liao Zhongkai－Yan Bijun/Feng Xiaojin/Deng Weili	Li Bing－Wang Fenrui/Ji Weihua; The Land Of Rebirth－Yan Bijun/Feng Xiaojin/Deng Weili

== Special Award ==
- Special Jury Award
  - Literatural Documentary: Mao Zedong
  - Documentary in Revolution Theme: Crossing the Chishui River Four Times
  - Feature: 不该发生的故事
  - Children Feature: The Candidate
  - Director: Chen Lizhou（Road）
