= 28th Golden Rooster Awards =

2011 Chinese film awards ceremony

The 28th Golden Rooster Awards was an award ceremony honoring the best Chinese language films of 2010–11. The award ceremony was held in Hefei, Anhui Province. It hosted by Wu Gang who had won Best Actor the previous year, with an opening performance by Zhao Wei, and was broadcast by CCTV Movie Channel.

== Schedule ==
Time	Event
08/17/2011	First Ballot of nominees
08/29/2011	Announced the nominees
10/22/2011	Nominee Ceremony
10/22/2011	Award Ceremony

== Winners and nominees ==
Best Film	Best Director
Shen Zhou 11; The Piano in a Factory; Sui Sui Qing Ming; Love On Gallerv Bridge; Aftershock	Chen Li－Love On Gallerv Bridge; Zhang Meng－The Piano in a Factory; Ning Cai－Mother; An Zhanjun－Jing Sha; Feng Xiaogang－Aftershock; Gao Feng－Lao Zhai
Best Directorial Debut	Best Writing
Lu Yang－My Spectacular Theatre; Jiang Wenli－Lan; Du Bo/Guo Zhirong－Blue School; Deng Ke－Angle; Gao Feng－An Eternal Lamb	Cheng Xiaoling－Sui Sui Qing Ming; Xing Yuanping－Lao Zhai; Zhang Meng－The Piano in a Factory; Su Xiaowei－Aftershock; Liu Jianwei/Liu Hongwei/Wang Qiang/Zhao Junfang/Liang Shuibao－Shen Zhou 11; Yang Xiaoyan/Wang Jing－Hai Zi Na Xie Shi Er
Best Actor	Best Actress
Sun Chun－Qiu Xi; Guo Fucheng－Love for Life; Liu Zhibing－Shen Zhou 11; Wang Qianyuan－The Piano in a Factory; Zhu Xu－Lan	Naren Hua－Mother; Lü Liping－City Monkey; Qian Peiyi－Sui Sui Qing Ming; Qin Hailu－The Piano in a Factory; Xu Fan－Aftershock; Yan Bingyan－Close to Me
Best Supporting Actor	Best Supporting Actress
Xu Caigen－Apart Together; Ba Yin－Beyond the Sacred Land; Huang Xiaoming－The Message; Jin Shijie－Blind Cinema; Li Xinmin－Lao Zhai; Zhao Erkang－Secret Fragrance	Guo Ge－Through Stunning Storms; Jiang Qinqin－Bright Sunshine; Jiang Ruijia－Shen Zhou 11; Li Bin－City Monkey; Zaiyinaipu Ailemutayi－An Eternal Lamb; Zhang Jingchu－Aftershock
Best Cinematography	Best Art Direction
The Seal of Love－Sun Ming; Aftershock－Lü Yue; Qing Gui Tao Ran Ting－Song Dehua; Mother－Shao Dan; Fairy Tales－Li Li; Through Stunning Storms－Cai Shunan	Aftershock－Huo Tingxiao; Qiu Xi－Shen Xiaoyong; The Message－Xiao Haihang/Yang Haoyu; The Seal of Love－Zhou Xinren; Love On Gallerv Bridge－Zhou Jinglun
Best Music	Best Sound Recording
Aftershock－Wang Liguang; An Eternal Lamb－ Wu Yongmei; Love On Gallerv Bridge－ Zhang Hongguang; Love for Life－Zuo Xiaozuzhou; Bodyguards and Assassins－ Chan Kwong Wing	The Founding of Republic－Wang Danrong; Aftershock－Wu Jiang; Sky Fighters－Wang Lewen/An Shaofeng; Bodyguards and Assassins－Yang Jingyi; The Seal of Love－Zhao Jun
Best Documentary	Best Popular Science Film
My Garden of Eden; 在一起; 城市之光; I Wish I Knew	变暖的地球; 巧治松材线虫; 枸杞高产高效种植技术; 草原生态保护; 鲟鱼繁殖新技术
Best Children Feature	Best Chinese Opera Film
Close to Me; 幸福的向日葵; 孩子那些事儿; Xing Hai; Blue School	响九霄; 十五贯; 流花溪; 清风亭
Best Animation	
Legend of a Rabbit; Xi Bai Po; Tiger returns	

== Special awards ==
Lifetime Achievement Award

- Fu Zhengyi (Editor)
- Xiang Junshu (Dubbing Actress)

Special Jury Award

- Film: The Piano in a Factory
- Filmmaker: Zhu Xu
