= Song Chunli =

Chinese actress

- 宋春丽
- Born: 17 February 1951 (age 75); Ji County, Hebei, China
- Education: Beijing Film Academy
- Occupation: Actress
- Years active: 1980–present
- Spouse: Sun Weixi
- Awards: Full list

Chinese name
- Simplified Chinese: 宋春丽
- Traditional Chinese: 宋春麗
Transcriptions
Standard Mandarin
- Hanyu Pinyin: Sòng Chūnlì

Song Chunli (Chinese: 宋春丽, born 17 February 1951) is a Chinese film and television actress. She won two Golden Rooster Award for Best Actress, a Hundred Flowers Award for Best Supporting Actress and two Flying Apsaras Awards. Her recent work is television series Mother (2011).

== Biography ==
Song was born into a working-class family in Ji County (now Jizhou District of Hengshui), Hebei, on 17 February 1951. She has an elder brother.

In 1964, at age 13, Song was selected by the teachers of the Song and Dance Troupe of the Guangzhou Military Region and went south to Guangzhou, where she became a student. In 1985, she enrolled at Beijing Film Academy, where she majored in acting.

== Family ==
Song was married to Sun Weixi (孙维熙), who was a professor at the Central Conservatory of Music.

== Filmography ==
=== Film ===
Year	English title	Chinese title	Role	Notes
1979	Suffering Heart	苦难的心	Xiao Qiao	
1980	The Spy	奸细	Du Zhiwen	
1981	Female Soldier	女兵	Er Man	
1981	Blacksmith Zhang's Romance	张铁匠的罗曼史		
1982	Where Are You, Mom?	妈妈，你在哪里	Min Wen	
1982	Tianshan Mountain Trek	天山行	Lu Yingxian	
1984	Elder Sister	姐姐	the Elder Sister	
1984	The Story of a Family	家庭琐事录	Chun Xing	
1984	A Man is Coming Here	来了个男子汉	Factory director He	
1987	Mandarin Duck Mansion	鸳鸯楼		
1987	Young Emperors of China	中国的“小皇帝”		
1988	A Story of Fortune Makers	哥们儿发财记	Du Lamei	
1988	Silly Manager	傻冒经理	Zhang Daju	
1991	Decisive Engagement: The Liaoxi-Shenyang Campaign	大决战之辽沈战役	wife of Wei Lihuang	
1991	Steel Meets Fire	烈火金钢之神奇英雄	Jin Yuebo	
1991	Steel Meets Fire	烈火金钢之孤胆英雄	Jin Yuebo	
1992	Female Prison Brigade	女囚大队	Xiao Chun	
1993	The Foggy House	雾宅	Doctor	
1995	Jiu Xiang	九香	Jiu Xiang	
1996	The Days Without Lei Feng	离开雷锋的日子	wife of Qiao Anshan	
1997	Still Be Mother and Son Next Life	下辈子还做母子	Zhao Liyun	
1999	Our Days	咱那些日子	Bai Yulan	
2000	To be With You Forever	相伴永远	Cai Chang	
2000	Godness in War-time	走出硝烟的女神	Chen Daman	
2002	Go Home	生旦净末	Mother	
2006	Endless Love	情暖万家	Aunt Zhang	
2009	Glittering Days	万家灯火	District Governor	
2009	Frightening Moment	惊天动地	Mother of Ren Yue	
2013	The Sweet Smile	雷锋的微笑	Aunt	
2013	Chinese Look	正骨	Li Xiufang	
2014	The Galaxy On Earth	天河	Mother of Dong Wangchuan	
2015	A Promise to the Kurichenko's	相伴库里申科	Tan Xiaohui (elderly)	
2018	The Blizzard	道高一丈	Aunt Liu	
2019	Gone with the Light	被光抓走的人	Mother of Wu Wenxue	
2021	Island Keeper	守岛人	Mother of Wang Jicai	

=== Television ===
Year	English title	Chinese title	Role	Notes
1979	The Last Cancer Victim	最后一个癌症死者		
1987	Plain Clothes Policeman	便衣警察	Yan Jun	
1988	War on the Asphalt Road	柏油路上的战争		
1990	Beauty	风雨丽人	Ye Xiuqing	
1992	The Story of Murder Street	杀人街的故事	Li Hua	
1993	Hippocampal Dance Halls	海马歌舞厅		
1993	I Love My Family	我爱我家	Xu Xiaoli	
1995	The True Nature of Police	警察本色		
1996		爱情帮你办	Ye Sijie	
1997		东方热土东方人		
1997	Money Game	金钱游戏		
1997	Love Is Payable	侬本多情	Hu Ying	
1997	Big Shot Li Delin	大人物李德林		
1997	Bays of Being Parents	可怜天下父母心		
1998	The Jiawu Land War	甲午陆战		
1998	Supreme Right	至高权利	Qin Wenxiu	
1998	Law of This World	人间正道	Liu Jinping	
1999		老道口	Han Dongli	
1999	Our Days	咱那些日子	Bai Yulan	
1999	Hongyan	红岩	Sister Jiang	
1999	Criminal Evidence	罪证	Lu Yaqin	
1999	Absolute Strike	绝对打击/黑色的梦	Liu Meng	
2000	Dragon Ball Storm	龙珠风暴	Wu Zetian	
2001	Yang Yang's Third Marriage	杨洋三嫁	Mother Yang	
2001	Qin Shi Huang	秦始皇	Mrs. Huayang	
2001		照亮灵魂的阳光	Liu Ran	
2002	Behind the Vanity	浮华背后	Du Xinping	
2002	Police Commissioner	公安局长	Han Zhenfen	
2002		不可饶恕	Lin Zhi	
2003	Testimony of Conscience	良心作证		
2003	Family Catastrophe	家变	Qin Xujuan	
2003	Don't Ask Me Where I Come From	不要问我从哪里来	Ye Huiying	
2003		银杏飘落	Ma Shuping	
2003	Mantis Boxing	螳螂拳	Mrs. Wang Liang	
2003	Standing Behind You	站在你背后	Chi Hua	
2003	The Second Spring	第二春	Liu Qing	
2003	Insider	知情者	Governor Liu	
2004		不堪回首	Cheng Zhiyun	
2004	Beautiful Heart	美丽心灵	Fang Qin	
2004	Blood Oath	血色誓言	Tang Yongjing	
2004	The Orange Block	橙色阻击	Secretary Jin	
2004	Divorced Woman	离婚女人	Mayor Wang	
2005		使命/反黑使命	wife of Mayor Hong	
2005	Plot Against	暗算	President Xu	
2005	Love in Sicilia	情归西西里	Grandma Shao	
2005	The Richest	首富	Grandma Xuan	
2005	The Emperor of the Ming Dynasty	大明天子	Concubine of Prince Yan	
2005	Giant Game	巨人游戏		
2006	Beautiful Chinese Knot	美丽的中国结		
2006	Give Me a Reason for Love	给我一个爱的理由	Xiu Shuzhen	
2006		别阻挡我的幸福	Su Yaqin	
2006	Never Compromise	决不妥协	Du Li	
2006	Bloody Sunset	血色残阳	Wife	
2006	The Black Ants	黑蚂蚁	wife of the governor	
2006	Red Plum Blossoms Bloom	红梅花开	Song Hongmei	
2006	New Hero Fearless	新英雄虎胆	Liu Ruochan	
2007	Wang Zhaojun	王昭君	Mother of Wang Dun	
2007	Because of Love	因爱之名	Yu Xia	
2007	Tears of Woman	女人泪/谍战狂花	Shui Ling	
2007		八彩人生		
2007	A Very Long Engagement	爱在战火纷飞时	Li Yujie	
2007	Former Wife	前妻	Lü Shuxian	
2008	Poor Mother Rich Mother	穷妈妈富妈妈	Tian Fang	
2008	Police's Stories	派出所的故事	Mother Mao	
2008	Human Love	人间情缘	Qiu Qiong	
2009	Nie Er	聂耳	Peng Jikuan	
2009	Get Married And Start Self's Career	成家立业	Zhao Shulan	
2010		家常菜	Wang Cuilan	
2010	Searching for Happy Days	寻找幸福的日子	Mother Hong	
2010	Mother	娘	Mrs. Meng	
2011	Man Qiu	满秋	Mother Guo	
2011	Emotions and Fate	情与缘	Ma Chunxia	
2012	Thorn in the Flesh	独刺	Song Huaizhen	
2012		成长	Tian Haiyun	
2012	The Mother	大地情深	Mother	
2014	If Happiness Comes	假如幸福来临	Sun Changmei	
2014	Domino Effect of Love	爱的多米诺	Mother Xie	
2017		布衣天下	Mother Su	
2018	Story of Yanxi Palace	延禧攻略	Empress Xiaoshengxian	
2020	Reborn	重生	Lou Yi	
2020	Roving Inspection Team	巡回检察组	Hu Xue'e	
2022	A Year Without a Job	没有工作的一年	Mother Song	
2022	A Lifelong Journey	人世间	Jin Yueji	
2023	Days of Our Lives	我们的日子	Na Renhe	
2024	Her Islands	烟火人家	Qiao Haiyun	
TBA		仁者春秋	Mrs. Mengchang	
TBA		空中突击		

== Awards and nominations ==
Year	Nominated work	Award	Category	Result	Ref.
1988	Plain Clothes Policeman	8th Flying Apsaras Awards	Outstanding Supporting Actress	Won	
1989	Mandarin Duck Mansion	2nd China Film Performance Art Academy	Golden Phoenix Awards for Academy Award	Won	
1989	Mandarin Duck Mansion	8th Golden Rooster Awards	Best Supporting Actress	Nominated	
1993	Beauty	13th Flying Apsaras Awards	Outstanding Actress	Won	
1996	Jiuxiang	16th Golden Rooster Awards	Best Actress	Won	
1997	Jiuxiang	6th China Film Performance Art Academy	Golden Phoenix Awards for Academy Award	Won	
1997	The Days Without Lei Feng	20th Hundred Flowers Awards	Best Supporting Actress	Won	
1998	The Days Without Lei Feng	4th Changchun Film Festival	Best Supporting Actress	Won	
2001	To Be With You Forever	21st Golden Rooster Awards	Best Actress	Won	
2012	Man Qiu	8th Huading Awards	Best Actress (Modern Drama)	Won	
2018	Story of Yanxi Palace	5th China TV Best Actor Award	Ruby Actress	Won	
2023	A Lifelong Journey	1st China TV Drama Annual Ceremony	Annual Outstanding Actress	Nominated	
2024	Days of Our Lives	2nd China TV Drama Annual Ceremony	Annual Outstanding Actress	Won	
