= China Film Association =

People's organization

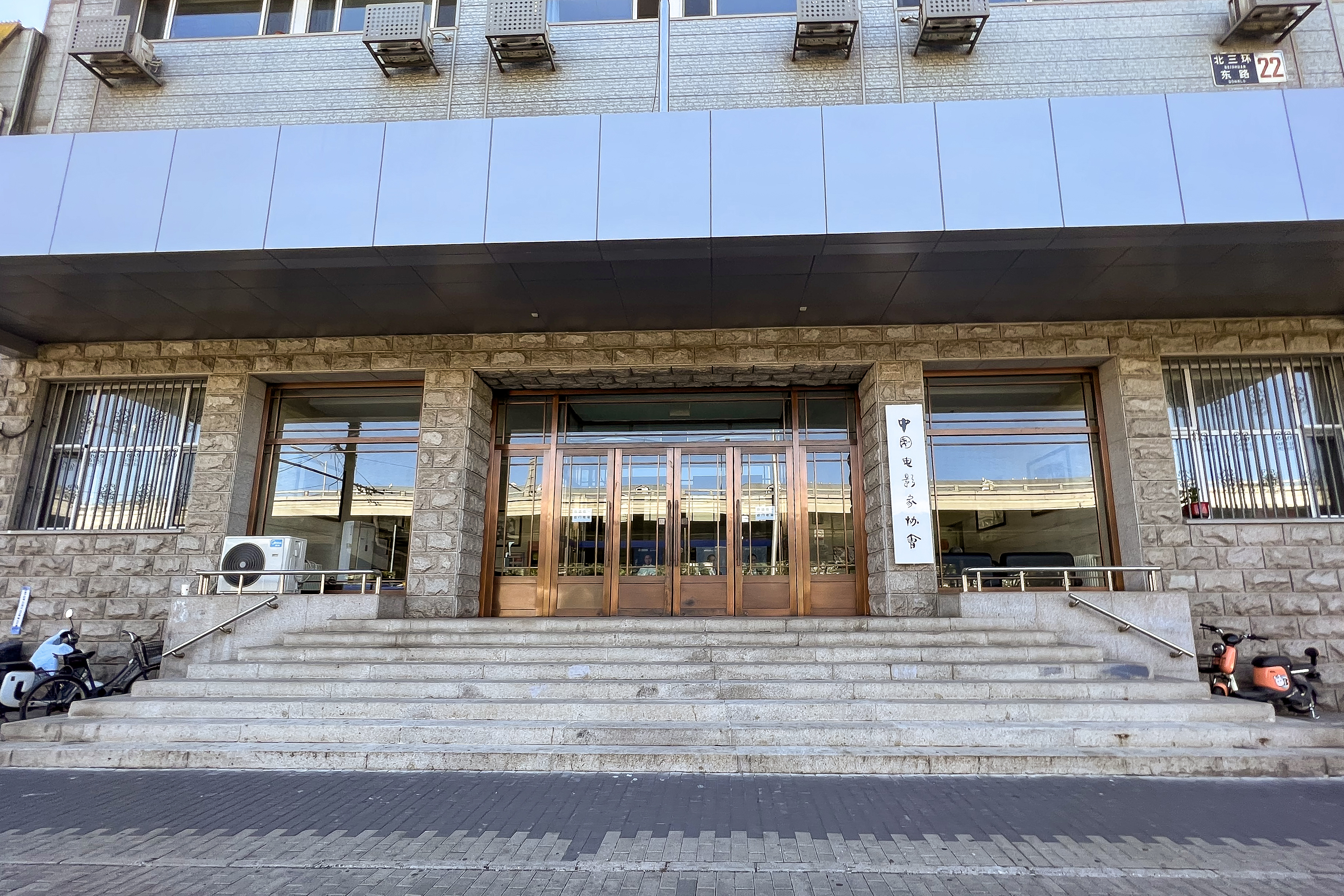
- Traditional Chinese: 中國電影家協會
- Simplified Chinese: 中国电影家协会
Transcriptions
Standard Mandarin
- Hanyu Pinyin: Zhōngguó Dianyingjiā Xiéhuì

China Film Association is a people's organization subordinate to the China Federation of Literary and Art Circles (CFLAC). Founded in July 1949, the organization was initially named the China National Film Artists Association. In 1979, it was renamed the China Film Association.

== History ==
China Film Association was founded in July 1949 with the name of China National Film Artists Association and then China Film Workers Sorority in 1957. In 1960, China Film Association changed its name to China Film Workers Association. Finally, it renamed the China Film Association in 1979.

In 2010, the China Film Association signed a partnership with its New Zealand homologue Film Auckland. After the 2012 Beijing Treaty on Audiovisual Performances, the China Film Association developed growing ties with the Screen Actors Guild–American Federation of Television and Radio Artists (SAG-AFTRA). In 2014, the China Film Association created the International Communication Committee of the China Film Association (ICCCFA) to oversee the industrial development of Chinese cinema and its development abroad, with DMG as an exclusive business partner. Since the 2017 Film Industry Promotion Law, the Chinese film industry is encouraged to favor domestic productions.

== Members ==
	Start	End	Chairman	Vice-chairmen	Secretary-General
1st	July 1949	1952	Yang Hansheng	Yuan Muzhi	
2nd	April 1954	July 1960	Cai Chusheng	Situ Huimin, Bai Yang, Sha Meng	
3rd	July 1960	1966	Cai Chusheng	Yu Ling, Tian Fang, Bai Yang, Ya Ma	
4th	November 1979	April 1985	Xia Yan	Yu Ling, Bai Yang, Situ Huimin, Cheng Yin, Chen Huangmei, Zhang Junxiang, Yuan Wenshu	
5th	April 1985	August 1998	Xia Yan	Su Yun, Situ Huimin, Wu Yigong, Xie Tieli, Yu Lan, Shi Fangyu	
6th	August 1998	2003	Xie Tieli	Ding Yinnan, Wang Xiaotang, Liu Jianzhong, Su Shuyang, Wu Yigong, Li Guomin, Li Qiankuan, Li Xuejian, Xi Meijuan, Xie Fei, Pan Hong	
7th	23 December 2003	26 December 2008	Xia Yigong	Li Pingfen, Li Qiankuan, Li Xuejian, Xi Meijuan, Kang Jianmin, Tong Gang, Xie Fei, Sai Fu, Pan Hong	
8th	26 December 2008	1 December 2013	Li Qiankuan	Yin Li, Feng Xiaogang, Jackie Chan, Li Pingfen, Li Xuejian, Zhang Huijun, Xi Meijuan, Kang Jianmin, Tong Gang, Pan Hong	
9th	1 December 2013	28 December 2018	Li Xuejian	Wang Xingdong, Yin Li, Feng Xiaogang, Jackie Chan, Zhang Huijun, Zhang Hongsen, Chen Kaige, Ming Zhenjiang, Xi Meijuan, Huang Jianxin, Kang Jianmin, and Pan Hong.	Rao Shuguang
10th	December 29, 2018		Chen Daoming	Yu Dong, Yin Li, Yin Hong, Jackie Chan, Ren Zhonglun, Su Xiaowei, Wu Jing, Zhang Hong, Zhang Hanyu, Huang Bo, La Peikang	
11th	January 2024	30 January 2024	Chen Daoming	Yu Dong, Wang Jian'er, Yin Hong, Deng Guanghui, Andy Lau, Wu Jing, Zhang Ji, Guo Fan, Huang Bo, Huang Xiaoming, Fu Ruoqing, Huo Tingxiao	

== Awards ==
The China Film Association hands out the following awards:

- Hundred Flowers Awards, mainland China, Hong Kong, Taiwan, since 1962
- Golden Rooster Awards, mainland China, since 1981

== Academic journal ==
- Popular Movies (《大众电影》)
- World Screen (《环球银幕》)
- Film Art (《电影艺术》)
- World Movies (《世界电影》)
- Annals of China Movies (《中国电影年鉴》)
