= A Mongolian Tale =

- Videocassette release cover
- Traditional Chinese: 黑駿馬
- Simplified Chinese: 黑骏马
- Hanyu Pinyin: Hēi jùn mǎ
- Directed by: Xie Fei
- Written by: Zhang Chengzhi
- Based on: Black Steed by Zhang Chengzhi
- Produced by: Ma Fung-kwok; Wellington Fung
- Starring: Tengger; Naren Hua; Dalarsurong
- Cinematography: Fu Jingsheng
- Edited by: Xie Fei; Zhao Xiuqin
- Music by: Tengger
- Production companies: Beijing Youth Film Studio & Media Asia Films
- Release date: 29 August 1995 (Montreal)
- Running time: 103 minutes
- Language: Mongolian

A Mongolian Tale (simplified Chinese: 黑骏马; traditional Chinese: 黑駿馬; pinyin: Hēi jùn mǎ) is a 1995 Chinese drama film directed by Xie Fei and adapted by the novelist and ethnographer Zhang Chengzhi from his novel, Black Steed.

== Plot ==
A Mongolian Tale tells the story of two childhood sweethearts from their youth into their adulthood as set on the Mongolian steppes. Nai Nai (Dalarsurong), an old Mongolian woman is living with her orphaned granddaughter, Somiya, when she accepts into her home a boy, Bayinbulag, whose mother has died and father cannot care for. Though raised as a brother and sister, Somiya and Bayinbulag grow close.

As Bayinbulag (now played by the Mongolian pop singer Tengger) is about to enter adulthood, his father suddenly writes and orders him into the city to study veterinary science. He leaves but promises Somiya that he will marry her when he returns. While in the city, Bayinbulag also becomes a student of music. When he returns three years later, he discovers that Somiya (now played by Naranhua) has become pregnant by another man. Bayinbulag chases him down and fights him, finally bringing out his knife with the intent to kill him. However, Nai Nai begs him to stop, and he returns home late at night drunk. Heartbroken, he leaves once more.

Twelve years later, Bayinbulag has become a celebrated folk singer. Somiya, meanwhile, has born four sons and one daughter, though she is generally neglected by her drunken husband. She reveals that Nai Nai and Bayinbulag's horse has died, and that she was taken in by a trucker. She also confesses that she has told her daughter, Qiqig (Aojirdai) that her true father will come back one day, using a description of Bayinbulag to describe him. Back home, Bayinbulag suddenly finds himself in the position of being a father-figure for the girl, who believes that he is her biological father.

== Cast ==
- Tingger as Bayinbulag, the main male protagonist, Tengger is a popular singer and contributed to the film's score, which was composed primarily of Mongolian folk songs.
- Naren Hua as Somiya, the main female protagonist, the actress Naranhua had previously starred in Xie's A Girl from Hunan.
- Dalarsurong as Nai Nai (Chinese for Grandmother), the kindly grandmother who takes in both her orphaned granddaughter, and the unwanted Bayinbulag. Dalarsurong was a veteran Mongolian actress at the time of the filming, having already acted for nearly fifty years.

== International reception ==
Though a simple film of love and loss, A Mongolian Tale was praised by Western critics, who saw virtue in the film's simplicity. In an early review, Variety found the film generally "lightweight" but nevertheless "beautifully made". Its premiere at the Montreal World Film Festival would also not go unnoticed, with the film garnering Xie Fei a best director award, and Tengger a special award for musical contribution.

Upon its general release, A Mongolian Tale generated positive press not only for its performances, but for its setting. One review, from the San Francisco Chronicle noted that the film's setting had a "grandeur all its own". That did not stop the reviewer from finding the film a "compelling romance in a land whose hard realities never yield to anything so insignificant as human dreams". Janet Maslin of The New York Times, while generally positive in her review, singled out the actress Dalarsurong in her role as Nai Nai as "eas[ing] into the radiant role of this film's endlessly wise foster grandmother". Andrew Johnston, writing in Time Out New York, observed "This Tale's greatest assets are panoramic vistas of Mongolia's open spaces, courtesy of cinematographer Fu Jingsheng."
