= 9th Golden Rooster Awards =

1989 Chinese film awards ceremony

The 9th Golden Rooster Awards honoring the best in mainland China film, was given in Guanzhou, Guangdong Province.

== Winners and nominees ==
Best Film	Best Director
N/A; Wan Zhong; The Republic Will Never Forget; The Troubleshooters	Wu Ziniu－Wan Zhong/Happy Heroes/The Dead and the Living; Wang Haowei－Take Me Home Country Roads; Mi Jiashan－The Troubleshooters
Best Directorial Debut	Best Writing
N/A; Tu Gongyi－Wifeless Family	N/A; Xu Yali－Wild Snow; Tian Junli/Zhai Junjie－The Republic Will Never Forget
Best Actor	Best Actress
Tao Zeru－Wan Zhong/Happy Heroes/The Dead and the Living; Xie Yuan－The King of Chess/大喘气; Lei Han－Loop; Yan Xiang－When does the day break?	Xu Shouli－Happy Heroes/The Dead and the Living; Wu Yujuan－The Price of Frenzy
Best Supporting Actor	Best Supporting Actress
Sun Min－Wan Zhong; Jin Hua－Happy Heroes/The Dead and the Living; Xie Yuan－The Price of Frenzy	N/A; Ma Xiaoqing－The Troubleshooters
Best Children Film	Best Documentary
The Dreaming Age	蛇口奏鸣曲; 中国航天城; 决定命运的时刻
Best Animation	Best Popular Science Film
Feelings of Mountains and Waters; Picasso and Ox; Ding	增长的代价——人口与经济; 神奇的稀土; 万里藏北
Best Cinematography	Best Art Direction
Wan Zhong－Hong Yong; Take Me Home Country Roads－Li Chensheng; Arc Light－Xiao Feng; Loop－Zhao Fei	Take Me Home Country Roads－Shao Ruigang/Hu Hongyuan; Wan Zhong－Na Shufeng; 巍巍昆仑－崔登高、牛晓林; When does the day break?－Duan Zhenzhong
Best Music	Best Sound Recording
N/A; The Village of Widows－Cheng Dabei/Zhang Dalong; Wan Zhong－Ma Jianping	N/A; The Troubleshooters－Luo Guohua; The Kunlun Column－Shi Pingyi; 山魂霹雳－Zhang Ye
Best Editing	
The Price of Frenzy－Zhong Furong; Take Me Home Country Roads－Jia Wenjin; The Decapitating Sword －Chen Huifang; The Troubleshooters－Chen Xunlei	
