= 2nd Golden Rooster Awards =

1982 Chinese film awards

The 2nd Golden Rooster Award honoring the best in mainland film of 1982. Award Ceremony held in Xi'an, Shaanxi Province.

== Winners and nominees ==
Best Film	Best Director
Neighbor; The Drive to Win; Xi'an Incident	Cheng Yin－Xi'an Incident; Shui Hua－The Condition of an Injury; Zheng Dongtain/Xu Guming－Neighbor
Best Actor	Best Actress
Zhang Yan－Laughs at Moon Bar; Jin Ange－Xi'an Incident; Feng Hanyuan－Neighbor	Li Xiuming－Xu Mao and His Daughters; Ren Yixiang－Nostalgia; Zhang Yu－Narrow Street
Best Supporting Actor	Best Supporting Actress
Sun Feihu－Xi'an Incident; Yu Shaokang－In-Laws	He Xiaoshu－Corner Left Unnoticed by Love; Zhang Jinling－Xu Mao and His Daughters; Wang Lihua－Female Soldier; Wang Yumei－In-Laws
Best Writing	Best Property
Zhang Xian－Corner Left Unnoticed by Love; Xin Xianling－In-Laws	Neighbor－Liu Qingbiao; Midnight－Qian Zhangxiong; The Condition of an Injury－Yang Yunmin/Zhang Xianchun/Wu Zhenshan
Best Chinese Opera Film	Best Documentary
N/A; Li Huiniang	先驱者之歌; 莫让年华付流水
Best Animation	Best Popular Science Film
N/A; Monkeys Grasp for the Moon; Mr. Nanguo	蜜蜂王国; 胆结石的奥秘; 蚜茧蜂; 长白山珍奇; 白蚁王国
Best Cinematography	Best Art Direction
The Condition of an Injury、Xu Mao and His Daughters－Zou Jixun; Xi'an Incident －Gao Hongtao/Zheng Yuyuan/Chen Wancai; A Very Long Journey－Cai Jinwei/Xu Lianqing	Midnight－Han Shangyi/Qu Ranxin/Li Huazhong; The Condition of an Injury－Chen Yiyun; Corner Left Unnoticed by Love －Chen Desheng/Wu Xujin
Best Music	Best Sound Recording
In-Laws－Yang Shaolu; The Drive to Win－Wang Ming; Nostalgia－Yang Shuzheng	The Drive to Win－Zhang Ruikun; Xu Mao and His Daughters－Zhen Mingzhe; Midnight－Miao Zhenyu/Feng Deyao
Best Editing	Best Stunt
The Condition of an Injury、Zhi Yin－Fu Zhengyi	Li Huiniang－Ge Yongliang/Chen Jizhang/Zhou Haofei
Best Custome	Best Make Up
The True Story of Ah Q/Nanchang Uprising－Cao Yingping; Corner Left Unnoticed by Love －Shuai Furong	Xi'an Incident －Wang Xizhong/Li Ende; Xu Mao and His Daughters－Sun Yuemei; Nanchang Uprising－Yang Longsheng

== Special Award ==
- Special Jury Award
  - Honorary Award: In-Laws
  - Documentary: Steel Great Wall
  - Director: Zhang Nuanxin（The Drive to Win）
