= A Dog Barking at the Moon =

- Film poster
- Chinese: 再见，南屏晚钟
- Directed by: Xiang Zi
- Written by: Xiang Zi
- Produced by: Xiang Zi; Jose Val Bal
- Starring: Naren Hua; Wu Renyuan; Nan Ji; Thomas Fiquet
- Cinematography: Jose Val Bal
- Edited by: Xiang Zi
- Music by: J. García Escudero
- Production companies: Acorn Studio; Granadian
- Release date: February 11, 2019 (Berlin)
- Running time: 107 minutes
- Country: China
- Language: Chinese

A Dog Barking at the Moon (Chinese: 再见，南屏晚钟) is a Chinese drama film, directed by Xiang Zi and released in 2019. A family drama, the film centres on the fallout of Juimei's (Naren Hua) discovery that her husband Huang Tao (Wu Renyuan) is secretly gay.

The cast also includes Nan Ji as their daughter Xiaoyu, and Thomas Fiquet as Xiaoyu's foreign-born husband Benjamin.

The film premiered in the Panorama program at the 2019 Berlin International Film Festival, where it won the Jury Prize from the Teddy Awards program for LGBTQ-themed films at the festival. At the 2019 Inside Out Film and Video Festival, it won the award for Best First Feature Film.
