= Yue Hong =

Chinese actress (born 1962)

- 岳红
- Born: August 13, 1962 (age 64); Chengdu, Sichuan, China
- Education: Central Academy of Drama
- Occupation: Actress
- Years active: 1984–present
- Children: 1

Chinese name
- Traditional Chinese: 岳紅
- Simplified Chinese: 岳红
Transcriptions
Standard Mandarin
- Hanyu Pinyin: Yuè Hóng

Yue Hong (born 13 August 1962) is a Chinese actress.

She is noted for her roles as Gui Lan and Da Lian in the films Wild Mountains and A Tale of Two Donkeys respectively.

== Early life ==
Yue was born and raised in Chengdu, Sichuan. After Resumption of University Entrance Examination in 1977, she entered Central Academy of Drama in 1980, majoring in acting, where she graduated in 1984.

== Acting career ==
After graduation, Yue was assigned to August First Studio as an actress.

Yue had her first experience in front of the camera in 1984, and she was chosen to act as a support actor in The Isle.

Yue first rose to prominence in 1985 for performing sketch in the CCTV New Years Gala. It reached number one in the ratings when it aired in China.

Yue won the Best Actress Award at the 6th Golden Rooster Awards for her performance in Wild Mountains, and she won the Golden Phoenix Award.

For her role as Yang Guizhen in Eight Women Die a Martyr (1987), Yue won the Xiaobaihua Award for Best Supporting Actress.

In 2009, Yue played in Li Dawei's film A Tale of Two Donkeys, for which she won the Best Supporting Actress Award at the 27th Golden Rooster Awards, and the Most Popular Actress Award at the 12th Shanghai International Film Festival. That same year, she appeared in Shaken World, which earned her a Best Actress Award at the 6th Guangzhou University Student Film Festival.

== Personal life ==
Yue and her husband divorced in 1990, and they have a daughter, Kaola (Chinese: 考拉).

In 2002, Yue was diagnosed with stomach cancer. She perfectly recovered from her illness in 2005.

== Filmography ==
=== Film ===
Year	English title	Chinese title	Role	Notes
1984	The Isle	小岛	Han Lin	
1985	Wild Mountains	野山	Gui Lan	
1986	In Their Prime	他们正年轻	Yan Pingping	
1987	Eight Women Die a Martyr	八女投江	Yang Guizhen	
1988	The Woman Assassin	女刺客		
1989	The Animal Year	本命年	Luo Xiaofang	
1990	Beyond all Recognition	面目全非	He Ru	
1990	Street Knight	马路骑士	guest	
1991	Heros Shed No Tears	英雄无泪		
1992	Twin Brother	小鬼精灵		
1994		天地人心	Wang Bing	
2004	Laofei	老费		
2005	The Mountains	大山无言		
2005	Romantic Evening	浪漫黄昏	Han Qili	
2005	Goodbye, My Love	再见最爱的人	Mother Su	
2007	My Daughter, how can I love You	女儿，我该怎么爱你		
2007	sparks of Fire	星星之火		
2009	Clubstory	社区故事		
2009		青花运	Guan Yilin	
2009		芦花飘飘		
2009		金牌工人		
2009	I Will Wait for You in the Heaven	我在天堂等你		
2009	Criminal Police 803	刑警803		
2009	A Tale of Two Donkeys	走着瞧	Da Lian	
2009	Shaken World	惊天动地	Ren Yue	
2010	Police 110	警方110		
2010		剪花女		
2011	Flying	飞天		
2011	Little Tigers	小小飞虎队	The woman matchmaker	
2011	Loyalty and Betrayal	忠诚与背叛	Mr. Fan's mother	
2012	The Safety Commissioner	安监局长		
2012	Deep Breath	深呼吸		
2012	The Moneybags	小镇大款		
2012		燃烧的石榴	Shi Liu	
2013		箭乡少女	Ge Zhen	
2013	The Tree In The Rain	雨中的树	CPC Secretary Zhong	
2013	Lei Feng in 1959	雷锋在1959	Ning Haiqiang	
2013	August 7th Meeting	八七会议	Zhang Yuzhong	

=== Television ===
Year	English title	Chinese title	Role	Notes
1986	Liaozhai	聊斋电视系列片之狐仙驯悍记	Mrs. Yin	
1996		满天星	Tian Xiaohui	
1996		追你到天边	Mrs. Chun	
1996		别说我没良心		
1997	Shipubu	石瀑布		
1997	A Leaf in the Storm	风声鹤唳		
1997		海峡有爱		
1998	Act of Will	风雨人生		
1998	The Story of Chuzu Village	出租村的故事		
1999		一路黄昏		
1999	The Gold Rush	淘金记		
2000		要塞兵变		
2000		武陵山剿匪记		
2002		乌龙闯情关	Hu Zu	
2003	Mother	母亲	Mother	
2003	The Legend of Concubine Li	骊姬传奇	Concubine Li	
2005	My Mother, how can I love You	妈妈，我该怎么爱你		
2005	The Good Man: Li Chenggong	好人李成功	Li Hua	
2006		家事如天	Wu Yue	
2006		母爱十三宗	Zheng Tong	
2006		商贾将军	The Businesswoman	
2006	A Very Long Engagement	爱在战火纷飞时	Japan's military women	
2006	Divorce Case	离婚官司	Zhang Shuixia	
2006		乐意为人	Wen Hong	
2008	Tibets Tin Road	雪域天路	Tao Mujin	
2009	Thirty Years after Marriage	婚后三十年	Liu Yun	
2009	The Legend of Wang Baozhang	王保长歪传	Jiang Jinfeng	
2010		江湖绝恋	Mrs. Ji	
2010	The Story of Wenchuan	汶川故事	guest	
2010		双城生活	Niu Yibei	
2010	Luogu Lane	锣鼓巷	Mrs. Cheng	
2010	Home Cooking	家常菜	Yu Qiuhua	
2010	Sent-down Youth	知青	Liang Xixi	
2010	Chinese Expeditionary Force	中国远征军	Mother Han	
2010	Raise Head and See Bliss	抬头见喜	Chen Shuzhen	
2010		一家不说两家话	Liu Qingxiang	
2011		给水团		
2011	Burning My Youth	青春燃烧的岁月		
2011	Cao Cao	盖世英雄曹操	Empress Dowager Dong	
2011	My Father's Wish	老爸的心愿		
2011		极速解码		
2011	Return to Dafu Village	重返大福村	Xiao Yong's mother	
2012	Xiangmuhu	香木虎		
2012		老爹的非诚勿扰	Gui Hua	
2012	Peace is lucky	平安是福		
2013	The Story of Longmen Village	龙门村的故事		
2013	The Marriage Age	后婚姻时代		

== Awards ==
Year	Work	Award	Result	Notes
1986	Wild Mountains	6th Golden Rooster Award for Best Actress	Won	
1987	Wild Mountains	Golden Phoenix Award	Won	
2009	A Tale of Two Donkeys	27th Golden Rooster Award for Best Supporting Actress	Won	
2009	A Tale of Two Donkeys	12th Shanghai International Film Festival for the Most Popular Actress	Won	
2009	Shaken World	6th Guangzhou University Student Film Festival - Best Actress	Won	
2012	Raise Head and See Bliss	China Golden Eagle TV Art Award for Favorite Actress	Won	
2013	Deep Breath	13th Baihe Award for Outstanding Actress	Won	
2013	Deep Breath	20th Beijing College Student Film Festival - Actress Award	Won	
