= 14th Golden Rooster Awards =

1994 Chinese film awards ceremony

The 14th Golden Rooster Awards, honoring the best in film, were given on 1994 at the Changsha, Hunan province.

== Winners and nominees ==
=== Best Film ===
Country Teachers/凤凰琴

- 第一诱惑
- 东归英雄传

=== Best Director ===
He Ping - Red Firecracker, Green Firecracker

- Sai Fu/Mai Lisi - 东归英雄传

=== Best Directorial Debut ===
Yang Tao - Burning Snow

=== Best Writing ===
Jie Sheng/Liu Xinglong/Bu Yangui - Country Teachers

- Wang Tianyun/Lu Shoujun - 第一诱惑

=== Best Actor ===
Li Baotian - Country Teachers

- Wu Gang (actor) - Red Firecracker, Green Firecracker

=== Best Actress ===
Pan Hong - Shanghai Fever

- Ning Jing - Red Firecracker, Green Firecracker
- Bo Han - Romance in Metropolitan Shanghai

=== Best Supporting Actor ===
Fang Zige - No More Applause

- Zhao Xiaorui - Red Firecracker, Green Firecracker
- Yu Shaokang - Hurricane over the Sea

=== Best Supporting Actress ===
not awarded this year

- Ding Jiali - No More Applause

=== Best Art Direction ===
Qian Yunxuan - Red Firecracker, Green Firecracker
Lv Zhichang/Yang Baocheng - Chongqing Negotiations

- Zhao Mei - Country Teachers

=== Best Cinematography ===
Ge Ritu - 东归英雄传

- Yang Lun - Red Firecracker, Green Firecracker
- Cai Shunan/Ning Chao/Dong Yachun - Dog King

=== Best Editing ===
Sun Huiming - Narrow Escape
Nie Weiguo - 大漠歼匪

=== Best Music ===
Daoerji Cao - 东归英雄传

- Ma Ding - Burning Snow

=== Best Sound Recording ===
Li Bojiang - Yunnan Story

=== Best Animation ===
鹿女

- 魔方大厦第八部——头盔城

=== Best Documentary ===
水中影

- 中国出了个毛泽东
