= Shanghai Film Critics Award for Best Actress =

Annual Chinese film award

Best Actress is one of the main category of Shanghai Film Critics Awards.

== Winners list ==
Year	Winner	Chinese name	Title(s)	Chinese Title(s)
2014	Gong Li	巩俐	Coming Home	《归来》
2013	Tang Wei	汤唯	Finding Mr. Right	《北京遇上西雅图》
2012	Ni Ni	倪妮	The Flowers of War	《金陵十三钗》
2011	Zhang Ziyi	章子怡	Love for Life	《最爱》
2010	Zhao Wei	赵薇	Mulan&14 Blades	《花木兰》《锦衣卫》
2009	Zhou Xun	周迅	The Equation of Love and Death	《李米的猜想》
2008	Miao Pu	苗圃	Cherry	《樱桃》
2007	Siqin Gaowa	斯琴高娃	The Postmodern Life of My Aunt	《姨妈的后现代生活》
2006	Zhu Yuanyuan	朱媛媛	The Forest Ranger	《天狗》
2005	Zhang Jingchu	张静初	Peacock	《孔雀》
2004	Shu Qi	舒淇	The Foliage	《美人草》
2003	Naren Hua	娜仁花	Heavenly Grassland	《天上草原》
2002	Xi Meijuan	奚美娟	Moon Light Tonight	《月圆今宵》
2001	Gong Li	巩俐	Breaking the Silence	《漂亮妈妈》
1999	Li Lin	李琳	Yao Wang Cha Li La	《遥望查理拉》
1998	Song Dandan	宋丹丹	The Red Suit	《红西服》
1996	Ning Jing	宁静	The Bewitching Braid	《大辫子的诱惑》
1995	Ai Liya	艾丽娅	Ermo	《二嫫》
1994	Pan Hong	潘虹	Gu Feng	《股疯》
