= Yan Bingyan =

Chinese actress

- Born: December 13, 1972 (age 53); Beijing, China
- Years active: 1994–present
- Awards: Outstanding Actress; 2013 Feng Shui – Li Baoli; Best Actress; 2007 Teeth of love – Qian Yehong

Chinese name
- Traditional Chinese: 颜丙燕
Transcriptions

Yan Bingyan (Chinese: 颜丙燕; pinyin: Yán Bǐng Yàn) is a Chinese film and television actress. She is the descendant of Yan Hui.

== Filmography ==
=== Television series ===
Year	English title	Chinese title	Role	Notes
1996		饮马流花河	Shen Yaoxian	
1996		民警程广泉	Huazi	
1996		影后胡蝶	Xu Yunqing	
1996	Sister Gan Nineteen	甘十九妹	Yuchi Lanxin	
1997	Humen Bridge	虎门大桥	Dingdang	
1997	The Formations of the Red Cross	红十字方队	Xiao Hong	
1998		情缘	Huang Ya	
1998	Detective Dee Case Legend	狄仁杰断案传奇	Yin Xian	
1998		深圳情缘	Dong Yanmei	
1998		红螺寺	Hong Yu	
1998		警界传奇	Xie Xiaoshuang	
1998		咱老百姓之妈妈打开你的门	Liu Ni	
1999	Big Shots	大腕	Tang Ya	
1999		川北剿匪记	Ying Hong	
1999	Black Blood	黑血	Zhao Xiaoli	
1999		光荣之旅	Gao Ge	
2000		非常案件	Hao Wei	
2000		月落长江	Yu Hong	
2001	Never Give Up	永不放弃	Wang Xiandai	
2001		人虫之与票虫斗法	Li Shijun	
2001		前世今生	Wu Meijuan	
2002	Sky Lovers	天空下的缘分	Jin Hua	
2002	Only You	非你不可	Lin Jianghao's wife	
2003	Loved Me Release Me	穿越激情	He Lang	
2003	The Vicissitudes of Life	人生几度秋凉	Su Zhen	
2004	By Accident	偶然	Lu Min	
2005		谷穗黄了	Kun Aimeng	
2005	Who Will Pay for Love	谁为爱情买单	Zhang Meijuan	
2005		超市麻辣烫之招聘秘书	Bai Lili	
2006	Empress Wu Zetian of China	无字碑歌	Empress Wang	
2006		天下第一媒婆	Qingqing	
2007	Crystalline Perforation	水晶眼之雪儿归来	Lin Xue'er/Fei Hua	
2007	The Good Man	好男当家	Li Xinxiang	
2007	Waiting for Happiness	守候幸福	Mei Chen	
2007	A Woman for a Lifetime	女人一辈子	Da Lanzi	
2008		十万人家	Wei Juan	
2008		义薄南天	Yang Yue	
2009	Beauty is Not Bad	美女不坏	He Ning	
2010		婚姻诊断	Yi Lisha	
2010		远山的红叶	Wang Ying	
2011		利剑无锋	An Hui	
2011	Borrow Gun	借枪	Zhou Shuzhen	
2011		满秋	Man Qiu	
2012	Old Patient	老病号	An Suzhen	
2012		走出硝烟的女人	Chen Daman	
2012	Jiao Yulu	焦裕禄	Xu Junya	
2012	Inspire the Life	感动生命	Hao Lin	
2014	Banquet	家宴	Da Mi	
2014	The Age of Return City	返城年代		
2014		良心	Zhang Liru	
2015	Lovers & Couples	伙伴夫妻	Han Qing	
2015	Years Such As Gold	岁月如金	Bai Ling	
2017	Game of Hunting	猎场	Shu Jing	
2018	Court in the Sun	阳光下的法庭	Bai Haiting	

=== Film ===
Year	English title	Chinese title	Role	Notes
1994		追捕野狼帮	Yang Zhen	
1994		歧路英雄	Xiao Yun	
1999		猛龙特警之天罗地网	Yu Lihong	
2000		赌王千霸之胜者为王	Zhang Tianlian	
2000		赌王千霸之逢赌必赢	Meng Yi	
2002		知己红颜	Yanyan	
2002		惊涛骇浪	Ah Ling	
2004	The Revenge of Larry	拉尔复仇记	Chen Xiaofeng	
2005	Teeth of Love	爱情的牙齿	Qian Yehong	
2006		爱比冬天更冷	Lin Mei	
2006		蜘蛛人与神犬	Xiu Fang	
2007	Legend of Love	牛郎织女	Zhang Haili	
2009	Close to Me	守护童年	Xue Ziying	
2009	Memory of Love	重来	He Sizhu	
2009	Looking for Jackie	寻找成龙	Rong Jie	
2011		老家新家	Chief Villager Lee	
2012	Full Circle	飞越老人院	Senior Home Director	
2012	Feng Shui	万箭穿心	Li Baoli	
2013	Ox Thief	牛胆神偷	Sun Lizhen	
2014	All for Love	三个未婚妈妈	Liu Erbiao	
2014	Stealing Legend	国宝疑云	Madame	
2015	We Will Make It Right	因为谷桂花	Tong Yueyue	
2015	Monk Comes Down the Mountain	道士下山	Cui Siruo	
2016	The Song of Cotton	盛先生的花儿	Mianhua (Cotton)	
2017	The Door	完美有多美	Chen Dajie	
2018	Hong Kong Rescue	香港大营救	Bai Mengyao	

== Accolades ==
Year	Awards	Category	Nominated work	Ref.
1996	16th China TV Golden Eagle Award	Best Supporting Actress	The Formations of the Red Cross	
2007	26th Golden Rooster Award	Best Actress	Teeth of Love	
2009	12th Golden Phoenix Awards	Society Award	Legend of Love	
2011	11th China International Children's Film Festival	Best Adult Actor	Close to Me	
2013	4th China Film Director's Guild Awards	Best Actress	Feng Shui	
2013	3rd Beijing International Film Festival	Best Actress	Feng Shui	
2013	13th Baihe Awards	Best Actress	Feng Shui	
2013	20th Beijing College Student Film Festival	Best Actress	Feng Shui	
2013	13th Chinese Film Media Awards	Best Actress	Feng Shui	
2013	1st China International Film Festival London	Best Actress	Feng Shui	
2013	15th Huabiao Awards	Outstanding Actress	Feng Shui	
2016	13th China Movie Channel Media Awards	Best Actress	The Song of Cotton	
2017	16th Golden Phoenix Awards	Society Award	We Will Make It Right	
