= Heavenly Grassland =

2002 film

- Directed by: Sai Fu; Mai Lisi
- Written by: Chen Ping
- Starring: Naren Hua; Tu Men; Cai Ning
- Cinematography: Geritu
- Edited by: Zhang Jianhua
- Music by: Bao San
- Production companies: China Film Group Corporation; Neimeng Gu Film Studio; Inner Mongolia Film Studio.
- Distributed by: Film Bureau Beijing
- Release date: 30 August 2002 (Canada)
- Running time: 110 min.
- Country: China
- Language: Mandarin

Heavenly Grassland (Chinese: Tian Shang Cao Yuan) is a 2002 Chinese movie directed by Sai Fu and Mai Lisi starring Naren Hua, Ning Cai, and Tumen.

== Plot ==
The film tells about young Han Chinese boy Tiger, who is adopted by a family living in the steppes of Inner Mongolia.

The boy's father asks Shergan to look after his child while in prison. Shergan keeps his word and brings the boy to Mongolia, where he shares his yurt with his "feisty" ex-wife Baruma. The boy is at first shocked and repelled by the way of life of the people there, but in time learns to love his new homeland.

== Cast ==
- Guersireng
- Naren Hua
- Ning Cai
- Tu Men

== Reception ==
The film's "strong spectacular and exotic qualities and appealing performances" were noted, as was the possibility that the Chinese-Mongolian relations weren't "quite as harmonious as the film suggests" at the time of the film's release. Naren Hua's performance was particularly praised

== Accolades ==
The movie won Best Photography Award at the China Golden Rooster Awards. Naren Hua's performance won her several accolades, including the Shanghai Film Critics Awards for Best Actress.
