= Mother (2010 film) =

2010 film

My Mongolian Mother
- Directed by: Cai Ning
- Starring: Naren Hua
- Cinematography: Dan Shao
- Release date: October 2010 (South Korea)
- Running time: 110 min.
- Country: China
- Language: Mandarin

My Mongolian Mother is a 2010 Chinese movie directed by Cai Ning and starring Naren Hua. Naren Hua won the Best Actress Award at the 28th Golden Rooster Awards for her performance in the movie.

== Plot ==
The film is based on a true story and tells about two Chinese children transplanted in Mongolia, where they are adopted by Qiqigema Erji against the wishes of her husband, and raised as nomads. Once Chen Chen, one of the children, knows about his biological parents twenty years later, he leaves for Shanghai. The other child, Yu Sheng, also finally meets his biological parents, and is then faced with a choice.

== Cast ==
- Habura
- Naren Hua
- Tumenbayaer
- Yirgui
