= Tendol Gyalzur =

Tibetan-Swiss humanitarian (c.1951–2020)

Tendol Gyalzur (undated photograph)

Tendol Gyalzur (c. 1951 (Note: On 2 December 1951, according to her Swiss passport, but this birthdate was estimated later.)–3 May 2020) was a Tibetan-Swiss humanitarian, known for founding the first private orphanage in Tibet.

== Biography ==
Gyalzur was born as Tenzin Dolkar in Shigatse, Tibet. She lost her parents in the Chinese annexation of Tibet and as a child crossed the Himalayas on foot and on horseback to flee to India. She grew up in an Indian orphanage, and was chosen to be one of a dozen children sent to Germany by the Tibetan government in exile in 1963. In Germany, she obtained a nursing degree, married another Tibetan refugee, Losang Gyalzur, and moved with him to Switzerland.

When revisiting Tibet as an adult, the sight of numerous street children motivated her to found Tibet's first private orphanage in Lhasa in 1993, in cooperation with a Chinese nonprofit organization and Chinese officials. She later founded another orphanage in Shangri-La and supported a school for nomadic herders' children in Sichuan. In 2016, Chinese restrictions on the work of foreign organizations forced her to yield control over her establishments to the Chinese government. They closed in 2017 and 2018.

One of her sons, Songtsen Gyalzur, became a professional ice hockey player; Songtsen also established a brewery in Shangri-La, Shangri-La Beer. Gyalzur died from COVID-19 on 3 May 2020, in Chur, Switzerland, during the COVID-19 pandemic in Switzerland.

== Works about Tendol Gyalzur ==
- Polli, Tanja (2019). Ein Leben für die Kinder Tibets Die unglaubliche Geschichte der Tendol Gyalzur. Wörterseh Verlag. Lachen SZ. ISBN 978-3-03763-109-6. OCLC 1105102410.
