= Hibiscus Town =

- Film poster
- Traditional Chinese: 芙蓉鎮
- Simplified Chinese: 芙蓉镇
- Literal meaning: Lotus Town
- Hanyu Pinyin: fúróng zhèn
- Directed by: Xie Jin
- Written by: Ah Cheng; Xie Jin
- Based on: Hibiscus Town by Gu Hua
- Produced by: Tang Lixuan
- Starring: Jiang Wen; Liu Xiaoqing
- Cinematography: Lu Junfu
- Edited by: Zhou Dingwen
- Music by: Ge Yan
- Production company: Shanghai Film Studio
- Release date: 1986
- Running time: 164 minutes
- Country: China
- Language: Mandarin

Hibiscus Town (Chinese: 芙蓉鎮) is a 1986 Chinese film directed by Xie Jin, based on a novel by the same name written by Gu Hua. The film, a melodrama, follows the life and travails of a young woman who lives through the turmoil of the Cultural Revolution and as such is an example of the "scar drama" genre that emerged in the 1980s and 1990s that detailed life during that period. The film was produced by the Shanghai Film Studio.

The film won Best Film for 1987 Golden Rooster Awards and Hundred Flowers Awards, as well as Best Actress awards for Liu Xiaoqing at both ceremonies. It was also selected as the Chinese entry for the Best Foreign Language Film at the 60th Academy Awards, but was not accepted as a nominee.

The village in Hunan province where the film was made was initially known as Wang Village (王村; pinyin: Wáng cūn). In 2007, the village was renamed Furong zhen (芙蓉镇) owing to this film.

== Plot ==
The film follows Hu Yuyin (Liu Xiaoqing), a young and hardworking woman in a small Chinese town on the eve of the Cultural Revolution. She is happily married and runs a successful roadside food stall, selling spicy rice beancurd. Yuyin is supported by Party members Li Mangeng (Zhang Guangbei), who once wanted to marry her, and Director Gu (Zheng Zaishi), a war veteran in charge of the granary. But in 1964 the Four Cleanups Movement sends a Party work-team to root out Rightists and capitalist roaders. The team is led by Li Guoxiang (Xu Songzi), a single woman, assisted by Wang Qiushe (Zhu Shibin), a former poor peasant who has lost his land because of his drinking. At a public struggle session, Yuyin is declared to be a "new rich peasant." Both her home and business are taken from her, and her husband, Li Guigui (Liu Linian) is executed for trying to kill Li Guoxiang.

After the first waves of the Revolution have ended, Yuyin, now relegated to a lowly street sweeper, returns to the town. She falls in love with Qin Shutian (Jiang Wen), who had come in the 1950s to collect local folksongs but was declared to be a member of one of the Five Black Categories. When Yuyin becomes pregnant, however, this loving relationship attracts the outrage of Li Guoxiang and Wang Qiushe, who are having a secret affair themselves. Shutian is sent to reform through labor and it is not until the reform and opening up of 1978 that his case is reviewed, and he is allowed to return and help Yuyin re-establish their food stall. At the end of the film, Li Guoxiang continues to hold a position in the bureaucracy while Wang Qiushe loses his mind.

== Cast ==
- Liu Xiaoqing as Hu Yuyin, the film's heroine, a young woman who is caught up in the political turmoil of China's Cultural Revolution. She originally sells rice beancurd with her husband.
- Liu Linian as Li Guigui, Yuyin's first husband
- Jiang Wen as Qin Shutian, a "bourgeoisie" rightist who falls in love with Yuyin
- Zheng Zaishi as Gu Yanshan, the granary director
- Zhu Shibin as Wang Qiushe
- Xu Songzi as Li Guoxiang
- Zhang Guangbei as Li Mangeng

== Reception ==
The film was well received domestically and voted by Chinese film audiences as one of the three best films of 1987 in the Hundred Flowers Awards. It also received the award for Best Film in the Golden Rooster Awards.

Gilbert Adair of Time Out magazine gave the film his endorsement, calling it "a potent blend of the political and personal":

"Xie's portrait of China's traumatic, turbulent history ranges from '63 to the post-'Gang of Four' years, his palette the changing fortunes of an entangled group of individuals. It's impressive both for the elegant precision with which the director fills his scope frame with small, significant details, and for the discreet understatement that controls his own special brand of epic melodrama. In some ways similar to the classic romances of Frank Borzage, Hibiscus Town is a moving account of survival in the face of widespread social and political madness, told with clarity, compassion and insight."

== Awards ==
- Golden Rooster Awards, 1987
  - Best Film
  - Best Actress — Liu Xiaoqing
  - Best Supporting Actress — Xu Songzi
  - Best Art Direction— Jin Qifen
- Hundred Flowers Awards, 1987
  - Best Film — tied with Dr. Sun Yat-sen and Xue zhan Taierzhuang
  - Best Actor — Jiang Wen
  - Best Actress — Liu Xiaoqing
  - Best Supporting Actor — Zhu Shibin
- Karlovy Vary International Film Festival, 1988
  - Crystal Globe, Grand Prix

== See also ==
- Cultural Revolution
- List of submissions to the 60th Academy Awards for Best Foreign Language Film
- List of Chinese submissions for the Academy Award for Best Foreign Language Film
