= Wang Xiaotang =

Chinese film actress (born 1934)

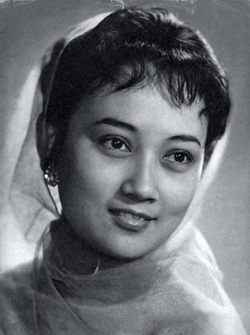
- Born: 4 January 1934 (age 92); Kaifeng, Henan, China
- Occupations: Actress, Director, Screenplay Writer
- Years active: 1934 – present
- Awards: Golden Phoenix Awards; 2007 Lifetime Achievement Award; Huabiao Film Awards; Special Jury Award; 2001 Fragrant Vows; Hundred Flowers Award; Best Picture; 2001 Fragrant Vows; Karlovy Vary Film Festival; Best Young Actress; 1958 Signal FireGolden Rooster Awards – 2001 Best Writing; Fragrant Vows

Chinese name
- Traditional Chinese: 王晓棠
- Simplified Chinese: 王曉棠
Transcriptions

Wang Xiaotang (born 1934) is a Chinese film actress, director and screenplay writer. She is a major general of People's Liberation Army. She won Golden Rooster Award for Best Writing and Hundred Flowers Award for Best Picture for her writing and directing for Fragrant Vows.

== Filmography ==
Year	English Title	Chinese Title	Role	Notes
1955	Mysterious Travelling Companion	神秘的旅伴		
1957	Signal Fire	边塞烽火	Ma Nuo	Karlovy Vary Film Festival for Best Young Actress
1958	Tiger Heroes	英雄虎胆	A Lan	
1963	Struggles in an Ancient City	野火春风斗古城	Jinhuan and Yinhuan	
2000	Fragrant Vows	芬芳誓言	Director/Screenplay Writer	Golden Rooster Award for Best Writing; Huabiao Film Award for Special Jury Award; Hundred Flowers Award for Best Picture; Nominated - Golden Rooster Award for Best Picture
