= Song Xiaoying =

Chinese actress

- Born: December 27, 1954 (age 71); Baicheng, Jilin, China
- Years active: 1973 - present
- Awards: Golden Rooster Awards – Best Actress; 1991 Her Smile Through Candlelight; Best Supporting Actress; 1984 Ward 16

Song Xiaoying (Chinese: 宋晓英; pinyin: Sòng Xiǎoyīng) is a Chinese film and television actress.

== Filmography ==
Year	Title	Director	Role	Notes
1974	Guerrillas on the Plain	Wu Zhaoti	Cuiping	
1976	The Lake of Suolong	Gao Chunhua	Zhou Yu	
1978	The Great River Flows On	Chang E	Xie Tieli	
1979	Yaya	Yaya	Sun Yu	
1983	Ward 16	Chunhua Liu	Zhang Yuan	Golden Rooster Award for Best Supporting Actress; Nominated - Hundred Flowers Award for Best Supporting Actress
1986	Yuanyang Lou	Master for Salon	Zheng Dongtian	Nominated - Golden Rooster Award for Best Supporting Actress
1991	Her Smile Through Candlelight	Wang Shuangling	Wu Tianren	Golden Phoenix Award Society Award; Golden Rooster Award for Best Actress
1993	Blue Kite	Mrs. Chen	Tian Zhuangzhuang	
2003	Taekwondo	Yang's mother	Sai Fu	
2005	A Time to Love	Hou's mother	Huo Jianqi	Changchun Film Festival Golden Deer Award for Best Supporting Actress; Nominated - Golden Rooster Award for Best Supporting Actress
2007	Da Ai Ru Tian	Lin Qiaoya	Gao Liqiang	Lily Award for Outstanding Actress
2015	We Will Make It Right	Grandema Xie	Liu Shujuan	Nominated - Golden Rooster Award for Best Supporting Actress
