= Shanghai Story =

- Film poster
- Traditional Chinese: 美麗上海
- Simplified Chinese: 美丽上海
- Literal meaning: beautiful Shanghai
- Hanyu Pinyin: Měilì Shànghǎi
- Directed by: Peng Xiaolian
- Written by: Peng Xiaolian; Lin Liangzhong
- Produced by: Hsu Feng
- Starring: Joey Wang; Josephine Koo; Feng Yuanzheng; Zheng Zhenyao
- Cinematography: Lin Liangzhong
- Edited by: Peng Xiaolian
- Release date: June 11, 2004 (Shanghai)
- Running time: 100 minutes
- Language: Mandarin

Shanghai Story (Chinese: 美丽上海) is a 2004 Chinese film directed by Peng Xiaolian. A family drama, the film was the surprise winner of the 19th Golden Rooster Awards in China, where it won best picture over the heavily favored House of Flying Daggers. The film's win was also surprising given that the story, according to Arthur Jones (film director) of Variety, included references to the Cultural Revolution, which is still a sore subject for Chinese censors. Even more surprisingly, the film was little-touched by censors. While the film's studio in Shanghai requested changes to the ending, Peng asked for the decision to come from the State Administration of Radio, Film, and Television in Beijing, who chose to leave the film be.

== Plot ==
The film follows the rise and fall of a family in Shanghai. Once wealthy capitalists, the family unravels during the Cultural Revolution; their home, once a French concession mansion, converted into a multi-family dwelling. Years later, the matriarch of the family announces that she is dying. When her four grown children return, it is the first time the family has been under one roof in decades.

== Cast ==
- Joey Wang
- Josephine Koo
- Feng Yuanzheng
- Zheng Zhenyao

== Reception ==
Shanghai Story had an unusual reception in China. Nominated for several categories at the Golden Rooster Awards, the film was not expected to win, which according to Arthur Jones of Variety, faced tough competition particularly from Zhang Yimou's big-budget wuxia picture, House of Flying Daggers. To director Peng Xiaolan's surprise, the film won nearly all major categories including the best picture, director, actress and supporting actor prizes. Even after these wins, however, the film was not immediately picked up for domestic distribution in China.

The film, however, was screened at several international film festivals, giving it exposure to audiences abroad.

Shanghai Story was eventually released in China in 2005 for the Mid-Autumn Festival.
