= A Girl from Hunan =

1986 film

- Video cover
- Directed by: Xie Fei; U Lan
- Written by: Zhang Xian; Short story: Shen Congwen
- Produced by: Don Yaping
- Starring: Naren Hua; Deng Xiaoguang
- Cinematography: Fu Jingsheng
- Edited by: Zhang Lanfong
- Music by: Ye Xiaogang
- Production company: Beijing Youth Film Studio
- Release date: May 5, 1986 (China)
- Running time: 110 minutes
- Country: China
- Language: Mandarin

A Girl from Hunan (also known as Girl from Hunan) (Chinese: 湘女萧萧; pinyin: Xiāngnǚ xiāoxiāo) is a 1986 Chinese drama film directed by Xie Fei and U Lan. The film was screened in the Un Certain Regard section at the 1987 Cannes Film Festival, and was one of the first mainland Chinese films to be commercially screened in the United States. The film is based on a 1929 short-story, Xiao Xiao (or Hsiao Hsiao), by author Shen Congwen.

== Plot ==
A Girl from Hunan tells the story of a willful young girl (initially played by Lin Qing and played as an adult by Naren Hua) who, at the start of the film, is about to enter into an arranged marriage with a two-year-old child, Chun Guan. Xiao Xiao, the girl in question, is only twelve.

Left by her uncle in this remote village, Xiao Xiao is expected to be less of a wife than a mother to her new husband and lives under the domineering control of her mother-in-law. Now sixteen, Xiao Xiao catches the eye of a farmhand, Hua Gou (played by Deng Xiaoguang). She lets herself be seduced by him and soon finds herself pregnant. Knowing that the traditional village still executes women for adultery, Xiao Xiao is desperate to abort the baby but fails to accomplish her goal.

With her pregnancy clear, Xiao Xiao faces the wrath of her mother-in-law, only to be saved by the appeal of her young husband, who has grown to love his wife, though perhaps more as a mother-figure than a spouse. When Xiao Xiao's child, a boy, is born, her mother-in-law begins the process of marrying off the child to yet another adolescent girl.

== Cast ==
- Naren Hua as Xiao Xiao (adult)
- Deng Xiaoguang as Hua Gou
- Lin Qing as Xiao Xiao (child)
- Yu Zhang as Chun Guan
- Ni Meiling as Chun Guan's mother
- Zeng Peng as Young Chun Guan

== Themes ==
A Girl from Hunan depicts how the beauty of human nature defeats the old feudal customs, and also reflects how the environment of Western Hunan is a closed place. Shen Congwen's distinct intoxication with the Chinese way of life can also be seen in the novel.

The film explores themes such as simplicity, innocence, ignorance, confusion and freedom. Typical figure Xiao Xiao has no culture, and has not been infected by the outside world. She has a young and beautiful heart with a primitive vitality, and in her we can feel a natural and unpolished beauty of human nature. People without intrigue and selfishness, full of warmth. We can also see this from the rustling sweetness between Xiao Xiao and her little husband, Xiao Xiao's delicate feelings towards Motley, the pure friendship between her little husband and Motley, the love and care of her grandfather, and the tolerance of the patriarch to Xiao Xiao after her unexpected pregnancy.
