= Pan Hong =

Chinese actress

- Born: 刘蓉华; 4 November 1954 (age 72); Shanghai, China
- Education: Shanghai Theatre Academy
- Occupation: Actress
- Years active: 1977 – present
- Awards: Changchun Film Festival; Best Actress; 1994 Shanghai Fever; Damascus International Film Festival; Best Actress; 1987 Last Queen; Shanghai Film Critics Awards; Best Actress; 1994 Shanghai Fever; Taormina Film Fest; Best Actress; 1988 WellHuabiao Awards – Outstanding Actress; 1994 Shanghai Fever Golden Rooster Awards – Best Actress; 1983 At Middle Age; 1988 Well; 1994 Shanghai Fever Hundred Flowers Awards – Best Actress; 1994 Shanghai Fever

Chinese name
- Traditional Chinese: 潘虹
- Simplified Chinese: 潘虹
Transcriptions
Standard Mandarin
- Hanyu Pinyin: Pān Hóng
Yue: Cantonese
- Jyutping: pun1 hung4
- Musical career
- Also known as: Hong Pan

Pan Hong (Chinese: 潘虹, born November 4, 1954) is a Chinese film actress.

== Early life ==
Hong was born as Liu Ronghua (刘蓉华) on November 4, 1954, in Shanghai. During the Cultural Revolution, her parents were forced to divorce and as a result, she changed her surname from "Liu" (her father's) to "Pan" (her mother's) and lived with her mother, who was born in 1922. On April 19, 1968, her father committed suicide because of persecution. Two days later, she came to the crematorium alone and took her father's urn back to her father's native place, Harbin, by taking the train.

== Career ==
After Pan graduated from the Shanghai Theatre Academy, she performed several supporting roles in films. In 1982, she shot to fame as a leading actress for At the Middle Age The movie is also known as "Ren Dao Zhong Ninan".

Chinese critics have named her "The last noble in the Chinese film industry".

She is the vice-chairman of the China Film Association and the China Film Performance Academic Society.

In February 2021 Pan's rendition of "Once Upon a Time" was used at Shanghai Disney's Enchanted Storybook Castle.

=== Awards ===
She was awarded a Hundred Flowers Award, Changchun Film Festival Golden Deer, Shanghai Film Critics Award. As the Golden Rooster Award for Best Actress three-time winner, Pan received a Golden Rooster Special Award in 1994.

== Personal life ==
Pan Hong's paternal grandfather is Russian. In 1978, 24-year-old Pan married Mi Jiashan (米家山). At the time, Mi was working at the Shanghai Filmmaking Factory, and her hometown is in Chengdu, Sichuan. After their marriage, Pan lived in Chengdu. However, the couple divorced in 1986. After the divorce, Pan returned to Shanghai and lived with her mother temporarily. To date, Pan has never remarried and has no children.

In January 1995, Pan Hong published her diaries written throughout 1994. Around 2003, Pan converted to Buddhism and became a vegetarian.

== Selected filmography ==
=== Film ===
Year	Title	Role	Notes
1977	Slave's Daughter 奴隶的女儿	Mala Wujia	
1978	Troubled Laughter 苦恼人的笑	Fu Bin's wife	
1982	Du Shiniang 杜十娘	Du Shiniang	3rd place - Hundred Flowers Award for Best Actress
1983	At the Middle Age 人到中年	Lu Wenting	Golden Rooster Award for Best Actress; 2nd place - Hundred Flowers Award for Best Actress
1984	Cold Night 寒夜	Zeng Shusheng	
1986	The Last Emperor 火龙	Li Shuxian	Nominated - Hong Kong Film Award for Best Actress
1987	The Last Empress 末代皇后	Wanrong	Damascus International Film Festival for Best Actress; Golden Phoenix Award for Female Actor; 2nd place - Hundred Flowers Award for Best Actress
1988	Well 井	Xu Lisha	Golden Rooster Award for Best Actress; Taormina International Film Festival for Best Actress
1989	The Last Aristocrats 最后的贵族	Li Tong	
1990	Single Woman 单身女人	Ouyang Ruoyun	2nd place - Hundred Flowers Award for Best Actress
1994	Shanghai Fever 股疯	Fan Li	Golden Rooster Award for Best Actress; Hundred Flowers Award for Best Actress; Changchun Film Festival for Best Actress; Shanghai Film Critics Award for Best Actress; Huabiao Film Award for Outstanding Actress; Golden Phoenix Award for Female Actor
2013	So Young 致我们终将逝去的青春	Chen's mom	
2015	Lost in Hong Kong 港囧	Xu's mother in law	
2015	The Last Women Standing		
2016	Kill Time 谋杀似水年华		

=== Television ===
Year	Title	Role	Notes
2001	Beyond Emotion 超越情感	Qi Runwu	
2002	Wu Tong Yu 梧桐雨	Zhu Yugui	
2002	Qing Yi 青衣	Liu Ruyun	
2003	Shao nian tian zi 少年天子	Empress Dowager Xiaozhuang	
2005	Moment in Peking 京华烟云	Mrs. Zeng	Nominated - Top Chinese TV Drama Award for Best Supporting Actress
2007	Thank You for Having Loved Me 谢谢你曾经爱过我	Su Yuzhen	
2008	Taiwan 1895 台湾1895	Empress Dowager Cixi	
2012	Mu fu feng yun 木府风云	Ms. Luoning	
2013	Hot Mom 辣妈正传	Mrs Deng	
2015	Tiger Mom 虎妈猫爸	Sun Yaxian	
2018	Win the World	Old Madame Ba	
2021	The Rational Life	Zhou Yilan	
