= Song of Tibet =

- Film poster
- Traditional Chinese: 益西卓玛
- Simplified Chinese: 益西卓瑪
- Hanyu Pinyin: Yixizuoma
- Directed by: Xie Fei
- Written by: Xie Fei
- Based on: 《冥》 by Tashi Dawa
- Produced by: Wang Ping; Han Sanping; Zhang Baoquan
- Starring: Dazengzhuoga; Laqiong; Dawangdui; Renqing Dunzhu; Tiehai Zhou
- Cinematography: Fu Jingsheng
- Edited by: Fen Sihai
- Music by: Zhang Qianyi
- Production companies: Shandong Film Studio; Beijing Film Studio; Beijing All Green Seasons Film and TV Ltd.
- Distributed by: Shandong Film Studio; Beijing Film Studio; Beijing All Green Seasons Film and TV Ltd.
- Release date: 10 October 2000 (Busan International Film Festival, Korea)
- Running time: 142 minutes
- Language: Tibetan
- Budget: ¥4,500,000

Song of Tibet (Chinese: Yixizuoma, Tibetan: Yeshe Dolma) is a 2000 Chinese film directed by Xie Fei, one of the "Fourth Generation" of Chinese directors. It depicts a Tibetan woman's love stories with three men in the last century of Tibetan history, during the social change from serfdom to modern society. Xie Fei went to Tibet five times to do research and choose locations. He said this was his most beloved and involved project, and he put a lot of thought and energy into the film. The film was censored by the government for six months and revised several times. When it was released in limited theaters, it did not meet Xie Fei's expectations. So he decided stop making films and became a producer, critic and film festival jury member.

== Plot ==
On her summer vacation, Dawa, a young Tibetan woman, returns to Lhasa from Beijing to visit her grandparents, only to find her grandfather, Jiacuo, gravely ill after suffering a stroke. As her grandmother, Yeshe Dolma, cares for him, she takes the opportunity to share with Dawa the love stories that shaped her life, revealing a past filled with passion, sacrifice, and heartbreak.

The first man in Yeshe Dolma's life was Jiacuo, a strong and optimistic mule driver from Kangba. During a transportation trip, he was captivated by Yeshe's radiant beauty and her enchanting voice as she sang love songs. Jiacuo's love was steadfast, and he won Yeshe's heart, marrying her after abducting her. Their early days together were filled with happiness, and they were blessed with a daughter. However, Jiacuo's life as a mule driver brought challenges. His heavy drinking and unreliability created instability, forcing Yeshe to go to her parents for help. After her father's death, Yeshe took up work as a nanny and housekeeper at Luoga Manor to repay family debts.

At Luoga Manor, Yeshe crossed paths with Gongsa, the young master of the estate. Gongsa had long admired her beauty and singing, his affection predating Jiacuo's. With Yeshe working under his roof, Gongsa finally had the opportunity to win her over. Their secret relationship resulted in the birth of a son. In 1959, Gongsa fled Tibet with the Dalai Lama, taking Yeshe's son with him and claiming the boy as his own. Devastated by Yeshe's betrayal, Jiacuo left for his hometown of Kangba with their daughter, marking a bitter end to their union. Years later, when Yeshe learned that Jiacuo was seriously ill, she embarked on a perilous journey to see him. Along the way, she reunited with Songqiu Lama, her childhood friend and first love. Songqiu had taught her to write and sing in their youth before his monastic life separated them.

During the Cultural Revolution, Songqiu was forced to leave his monastery and live a secular life, practicing Tibetan medicine. Despite the years and hardships, he remained a compassionate presence in Yeshe's life, encouraging her to continue her journey to Jiacuo. After guiding her partway, Songqiu retreated into seclusion on a sacred mountain to continue his Buddhist practices. Moved by her grandmother's stories, Dawa decides to fulfill Jaco's dying wish. She secretly arranges for Gongsa, who has returned to Lhasa after decades abroad, to reunite with Yeshe and Jaco. When the three elders meet decades of pain, regret, and longing pour out in tears of confession and redemption.

Before dying, Jiacuo asks Yeshe to invite Songqiu—now a revered Geshe—to perform prayers at his funeral. When Yeshe and Songqiu meet again after 30 years, their reunion is filled with gratitude and nostalgia. Songqiu performs the funeral rites with reverence and presents Yeshe with a collection of newly published songbooks by Cang Yang Jiacuo, the Sixth Lamam, they cherished in their youth.

On the seventh day of prayers for Jiauco, Yeshe Dolma died peacefully beside him. Her life story, characterized by themes of love, loss, and redemption serves as a legacy of resilience and grace for her granddaughter, Dawa.
