= Shanghai Film Critics Awards =

Annual Chinese film awards

- Description: Annual awards honoring excellence in national cinema, recognized as the only critics' awards in mainland China
- Country: China
- Presented by: Shanghai Film Critics Association and Shanghai Film Museum

Shanghai Film Critics Awards are given annually to honor excellence in national cinema by an organization of film reviewers from Shanghai Film Critics Association and Shanghai Film Museum. This event is the only critics' awards in mainland China.

== History and categories ==
The first annual held in 1991. From 1991 to 1993, they only selected 10 film awarded Film of Merit. Since 1994, adding categories, including Best Director, Best Actor and Best Actress.

No award was given out for the year 2015. As of 2016, only newcomer categories were awarded. In 2005 the Association named the Top 22 Films of Chinese Cinema.

== Awards ==
- Best Director
- Best Actor
- Best Actress
- Film of Merit
- Best New Director
- Best New Actor
- Best New Actress
