= Dr. Sun Yat-sen (film) =

1986 film

- Film poster
- Traditional Chinese: 孫中山
- Simplified Chinese: 孙中山
- Literal meaning: Sun Yat-sen
- Hanyu Pinyin: Sūn Zhōngshān
- Directed by: Ding Yinnan
- Written by: He Mengfan; Zhang Lei
- Starring: Liu Wenzhi
- Cinematography: Wang Hengli; Hou Yong
- Edited by: Feng Huilin; Yan Xiuying
- Music by: Shi Wanchun
- Production company: Pearl River Film Studio
- Release date: 1986
- Running time: 160 minutes
- Country: China
- Language: Mandarin

Dr. Sun Yat-sen is a 1986 Chinese drama film directed by Ding Yinnan. The film was selected as the Chinese entry for the Best Foreign Language Film at the 59th Academy Awards, but was not accepted as a nominee.

== Cast ==
- Liu Wenzhi as Sun Yat-sen
- Liu Simin as Huang Xing
- Ma Hongying as Wang Jingwei
- Zhang Yan as Soong Ching-ling
- Wang Yansong as Song Jiaoren
- Zhang Shihui as Chiang Kai-shek
- Xin Jing as Yuan Shikai
- Shen Weiguo as Chen Jiongming
- Wang Yongge as Zhu Zhixin
- Ruan Zhiqiang as Hu Hanmin
- Ren Chao as Liao Zhongkai
- Yu Zijian as Li Dazhao
- Wang Zhen as Mao Zedong
- Shinya Owada as Tōten Miyazaki
- Ryoko Nakano as Mrs. Miyazaki
- Wang Shihuai as Chen Qimei
- Sun Guolu as Soong Ai-ling
- Yu Luosheng as Charlie Soong
- Tang Tangmin as Zheng Shiliang
- Kazuo Kamiya as Shu Hirayama
- Isao Hashimoto as Nagatomo Kayano
- Xu Weihong as Lu Haodong
- Sun Sujie as Empress Dowager Longyu
- Tang Aimei as Liza Roos
- Shinji Ogawa
- Chiharu Iwamoto

== See also ==
- List of submissions to the 59th Academy Awards for Best Foreign Language Film
- List of Chinese submissions for the Academy Award for Best Foreign Language Film
