= Xie Fei (director) =

Chinese film director (born 1942)

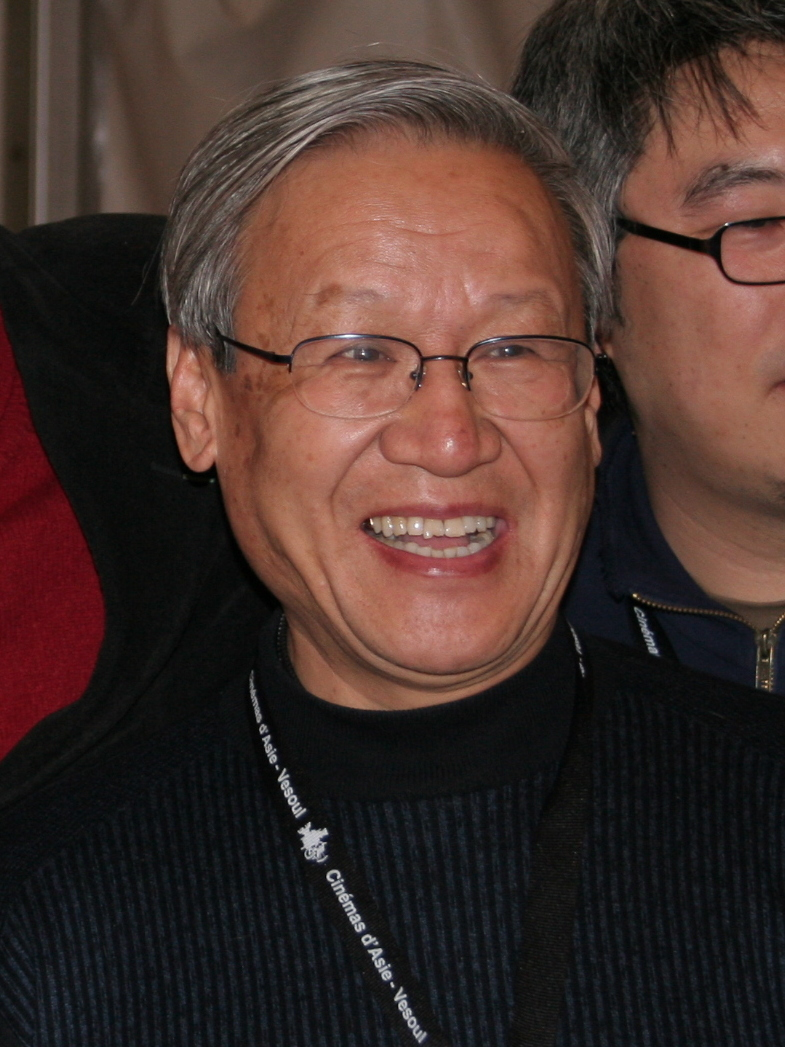
- Xie at 2007 Festival international des cinémas d'Asie
- Born: August 14, 1942 (age 84); Yan'an, Shaanxi
- Occupations: Film director, screenwriter
- Years active: 1980s-present
- Father: Xie Juezai
- Awards: Silver Bear; 1990 Black Snow; Golden Bear; 1993 Woman Sesame Oil Maker; Montreal-Best Director; 1995 A Mongolian Tale

Chinese name
- Traditional Chinese: 谢飛
- Simplified Chinese: 谢飞
Transcriptions
Standard Mandarin
- Hanyu Pinyin: Xiè Fēi

Xie Fei (Chinese: 谢飞; pinyin: Xiè Fēi; born August 14, 1942) is a Chinese film director, screenwriter, producer, film professor and film critic.

== Early life ==
Xie was born on August 14, 1942, in Yan'an city of Shaanxi Province, China and went to primary school and high school in Beijing. In high school he began to love drama and cinema. He wrote journals after watching films and played roles in school theater group.

In 1960 he was enrolled in Directing Department of Beijing Film Academy, and graduated in 1965.

== Career ==
Xie Fei has taught at his alma mater as an instructor and professor since and was the vice-president of that institution from 1985 to 1989. Although he has not made many films due to The Great Culture Revolution (1966–1976) and teaching career, most of his works are critics' favorites. Several of them won international film festival awards. His A Girl From Hunan (1986) and A Mongolian Tale (1995) were commercially distributed in American movie theaters by New York Films(1965–2009).

After Song of Tibet (2000) was censored for 6 months before releasing in few theaters, he stopped making films (at the age of 59). He has worked as producer, film festival juries in China and abroad.

In 2001 he directed 23 episodes of TV drama Sun Rise adapted from a play by noted Chinese playwright Cao YU 曹禺(1910–1996).

On December 15, 2012, Xie Fei posted an open letter on Weibo a popular Chinese Blog calling for changes of film censorship and won great support from film makers.

On November 16, 2024, at the 37th Golden Rooster Film Award Ceremony Xie Fei received a Lifetime Achievement Award from China Federation of Literary and Art Circles.

== Theme and style ==
Xie Fei adheres to a character driven narrative principle to produce natural tension and suspense in order to arouse audience sympathy and achieve his aesthetic goal. He cares for the fates of ordinary people with compassion, showing the pursuits and frustration of characters seeking truth and goodness. The empathy, tolerance and reverence for nature, life and Buddhist concepts are specially praised in his later works. Although he truthfully exposes and criticizes cold, cruel, and immoral characters and events, he is careful never to reduce his portrayals to comic book-like exaggeration. Instead, his films reveal a deep empathy towards his main protagonists, even when those characters are revealed to have ethical flaws. This sympathetic aesthetic is present in his treatment of almost every protagonist and minor character in his films. The themes of confession, redemption, tolerance, reconciliation in A Mongolian Tale (1995) and Song of Tibet (2000) are highlighted through characters and character relationships. These two works exhibit the richer humanitarian sensibility that Xie Fei developed as he entered his fifties, so they are more charming and profound.

He is skilled in his use of many audiovisual elements of film art. His manner of shooting and editing mixes several methods of mis-en-scene and montage. In shooting scenes, he constantly probes and innovates; His interior scenes with dialogue, action, and accentuated insert shots are fluent and full of tension. Many of the landscapes featured in his films are shot on location, which have become a vital component of Xie Fei's films. These locations not only introduce the environment and add a rich visual dimension to his style, but also reflect the joys and sorrows of the characters.

Here are some memorable techniques across his filmography: In Our Farmland (1983) the opening telephoto zoom shot of Yulin picking up Xinan at the Bajing train station); in Black Snow (1990) he only uses Zhao Yaqiu's songs as music track, which express the moods of the characters powerfully; dissolves that punctuate Li Huiquan's recollection of childhood; special lighting effects enhance indoor and outdoor night scenes, including top light and bottom light to portray characters; telephoto zoom close-ups of characters that exclude the background; the Steadicam long shot following the protagonist along the narrow path of the hutong courtyard; the smoldering light of Li Huquan and Fang Chazi's cigarettes cutting through the dark; In Song of Tibet (2000) the complex following shot of Para Manor in Gyantse County; the smooth pedestal shot to reveal Yixizhuma's house at the foot of the Potala Palace in Lhasa; In A Girl from Hunan (1986), risking censorship, he films the widow being paraded naked before being drowned by force. It is the first such portrayal seen in PRC Cinema.

== Selected films ==
Year	English Title	Chinese Title	Notes
1983	Our Farmland	我们的田野	Best Cinematography nomination at the 4th Golden Rooster Film Awards China
1986	A Girl from Hunan	湘女萧萧	Don Quixote Award at The 34th San Sebastian International Film Festival
1990	Black Snow	本命年	Silver Bear winner in the 40th Berlin International Film Festival
1993	Woman Sesame Oil Maker	香魂女	Golden Bear winner in the 43rd Berlin International Film Festival
1995	A Mongolian Tale	黑骏马	Best Director in the 19th Montreal International Film Festival
2000	Song of Tibet	益西卓玛	Best Screen Writer Special Award 20th Chinese Golden Rooster Film Awards

== Sources ==
- Yingjin Zhang and Zhiwei Xiao: Encyclopedia of Chinese Film 1998 Routledge ISBN 978-0-415-75702-7
- 《中国电影导演的艺术世界丛书：谢飞集》谢飞著 北京： 中国电影出版社 1998 ISBN 7-106-01276-9 /J.0644
- 《沉静之河》 谢飞研究文集/王人殷主编 北京：中国电影出版社 2002.12
- 《叙旧与尝新—谢飞自选集》谢飞著：王垚编 北京：中国国际广播出版社 2022.6 ISBN 978-7-5078-5147-2
- 《电影导演创作》谢飞著，北京：高等教育出版社2022.7，ISBN 978-7-04-057666-5
