= Red Firecracker, Green Firecracker =

1994 Chinese film by He Ping

- Film poster
- Directed by: He Ping
- Written by: Ye Daying; Feng Jicai (novel)
- Produced by: Weng Naiming; Chan Chun-Keung
- Starring: Ning Jing; Wu Gang; Zhao Xiaorui
- Cinematography: Yang Lun
- Edited by: Hong Yuan
- Music by: Zhao Jiping
- Production company: Xi'an Film Studio
- Release date: October 14, 1994 (China)
- Running time: 111 minutes
- Countries: China; Hong Kong
- Language: Mandarin Chinese

Red Firecracker, Green Firecracker (Chinese: 炮打双灯; pinyin: Pào dǎ shuāng dēng) is a 1994 film directed by He Ping and starring Ning Jing, Wu Gang, Zhao Xiaorui, Gao Yang, Xu Zhengyun and Zhao Liang.

== Plot ==
A young woman inherits her father's fireworks factory, as he had no son. The business does well and everything works in an orderly fashion, until one day an itinerant painter is hired to decorate the doors and vases at the factory for Chinese New Year. The woman, forbidden to marry as it would involve outsiders in the factory ownership, is drawn to the headstrong painter. When they fall in love, the situation throws her entire life into disarray.
