= Liu Xiaoqing =

Chinese actress and businesswoman

- Born: 30 October 1950 (age 75); Fuling District, Chongqing, China
- Occupations: Actress, producer, businesswoman
- Years active: 1970s - present
- Height: 1.59 m (5 ft 3 in)
- Spouse(s): Chen Guojun; Ai Fung
- Awards: Golden Rooster Awards – Best Actress; 1987 Hibiscus Town Hundred Flowers Awards – Best Actress; 1987 Hibiscus Town; 1988 The Savage Land; 1989 Chun Tao; Best Supporting Actress; 1980 What A Family; Special Achievement; 1992

Chinese name
- Traditional Chinese: 劉曉慶
- Simplified Chinese: 刘晓庆
Transcriptions
Standard Mandarin
- Hanyu Pinyin: Líu Xiǎoqìng
Yue: Cantonese
- Jyutping: lau4 hiu2 hing3

Liu Xiaoqing (born 30 October 1950) is a Chinese actress and businesswoman. One of the leading actresses in China in the 1980s, she is known for her roles in the films The Little Flower (1979), Reign Behind a Curtain (1983), The Burning of Imperial Palace (1983), Hibiscus Town (1986) and in the TV series Wu Zetian (1995).

== Biography ==
In her early days Liu worked as a farm labourer, a propagandist for the People's Liberation Army and then a stage actor for the Chengdu Military Drama Group.

Liu rose to national fame in a series of Chinese films such as The Great Wall of the South China Sea (1976), The Little Flower (1979), and What a Family (1979). Her star power reached new heights when she portrayed the ruthless Qing dynasty Empress Dowager Cixi in Chinese-Hong Kong co-produced epics The Burning of the Imperial Palace (1983) and Reign Behind the Curtain (1984), directed by Li Han-hsiang. During the back-to-back shooting of the film series, in response to the unprecedented publicity and scrutiny as a movie star in newly opened China, Liu published a 30,000-character autobiography titled I Did It My Way in a magazine in 1983, which included her famous quote: "Being a person is hard; being a woman is harder; being a famous woman is even harder; and being a single famous woman is the hardest of all." Her autobiography sparked a major debate on "individualism" in Chinese society at the time, was translated into 14 languages, and distributed worldwide. Liu also became a member of the China Writers Association as a result.

Liu later reprised the role of the Empress Dowager Cixi in two unrelated films, including Li Lianying: The Imperial Eunuch (1991). She won Best Actress at the Hundred Flowers Award for her role as Hua Jinzhi in The Savage Land, filmed in 1981 but not released until 1987, and again for her role in Hibiscus Town (1986). She holds a record for having won the most number of awards in the actress categories of the Hundred Flowers Award, with three Best Actress and one Best Supporting Actress.

Since the 1990s, she had shifted from acting to a successful business career. She became one of the richest people in China, appearing at 45 on Forbes' list of the 50 richest Chinese businesspeople in 1999. She promoted her success by publishing a book titled From A Movie Star to A Billionaire. However, in 2002, she was arrested for tax evasion in connection with her company, Beijing Xiaoqing Culture and Arts Company Ltd., fined 7.1 million yuan, for which she was forced to sell some of her possessions, and imprisoned for a year. After her release, she made a comeback to the entertainment industry. From 2005 to 2008, she performed in a stage play, The Last Night of Tapan Chin, in China and Taiwan.

== Filmography ==
=== Film ===
Year	Title	Role	Notes
1975	The Great Wall of the South China Sea 南海长城	Tiannü	
1976	Thank You, Comrades 同志，感谢你	Yang Jie	
1977	Spring Songs 春歌	Li Cuizhi	
1979	The Little Flower 小花	He Cuigu	
1979	What a Family 瞧这一家子	Zhang Lan	Hundred Flowers Award for Best Supporting Actress
1979	Wedding 婚礼	Sheng Min	3rd place - Hundred Flowers Award for Best Actress
1980	Mysterious Buddha 神秘的大佛	Meng Jie	
1980	The Little Flower 小花	He Cuigu, Yongsheng's mother	Wenhui Award for Best Actress; 2nd place - Hundred Flowers Award for Best Actress
1981	The Savage Land 原野	Hua Jinzi	Hundred Flowers Award for Best Actress; Nominated - Golden Rooster Award for Best Actress
1981	The Invisible Web 潜网	Luo Xuan	
1981	Xu Mao and His Daughters 许茂和他的女儿们	Xu Zhen	
1982	Deep at Heart 心灵深处	Ouyang Lan	
1983	The Burning of the Imperial Palace	Empress Dowager Cixi	
1983	Reign Behind the Curtain 垂帘听政	Empress Dowager Cixi	Nominated - Hong Kong Film Award for Best Actress
1984	Hibiscus Town 芙蓉镇	Hu Yuyin	Golden Rooster Award for Best Actress; Hundred Flowers Award for Best Actress
1984	Ormosia from the North 北国红豆	Lu Yunzhi	5th place - Hundred Flowers Award for Best Actress
1984	San Bao in Shenzhen 三宝闹深圳	Manager	
1985	The Ruthless Lover 无情的情人	Namei Qincuo	also producer
1986	A Wild Field	Hua Jinzi	Hundred Flowers Award for Best Actress
1987	Chuntao 春桃	Chuntao	Hundred Flowers Award for Best Actress
1987	The Imperial Cannon Team 大清炮队	Feng Yushu	also producer
1988	A Dream of Red Mansions (parts 1 & 2) 红楼梦	Wang Xifeng	
1989	A Dream of Red Mansions (parts 3-6) 红楼梦	Wang Xifeng	
1989	The Empress Dowager 一代妖后	Empress Dowager Cixi	also titled Xi Taihou (西太后)
1991	Li Lianying: The Imperial Eunuch 大太监李莲英	Empress Dowager Cixi	
2004	Plastic Flower 春花开	Xie Chunhua	
2010	Rang Ai Huijia 让爱回家	Female cop	
2011	Legendary Amazons 杨门女将之军令如山	Princess Chai	
2012	37		
2012	The Monkey King: Uproar in Heaven		
2015	Mojin: The Lost Legend		
2016	For a Few Bullets		
2016	Air Strike		
2019	The Eight Hundred 八佰	Sister Rong	
2019	Spy Wolf Chameleon		

=== Television ===
Year	Title	Role	Notes
1992	Fenghua Juedai 风华绝代	Chunni	
1993	Xin Bao Qingtian Zhi Yinglie Qianqiu 新包青天之英烈千秋		
1995	Wu Zetian 武则天	Wu Zetian	
1996	Huoshao Efang Gong 火烧阿房宫	Princess, Innkeeper, Mrs Yu	also producer
1998	Tao Zhi Lian 逃之恋	Xiaofengxian	also producer Nominated - Golden Eagle Award for Best Actress
2000	Huang Sao Tian Guihua 皇嫂田桂花		producer
2001	Huo Fenghuang 火凤凰	(various roles)	also producer
2002	Where the Legend Begins 洛神		producer
2003	281 Feng Xin; 281封信	Fang Meihui	also producer
2003	Hero During Yongle Period 永乐英雄儿女	Jinniang	
2003	Jiangshan Meiren 江山美人	Empress Dowager Meng	also titled Da Song Bei Ge (大宋碑歌)
2003	Changhe Dongliu 长河东流	Empress Dowager Xiaozhuang	also titled Shei Zhu Chenfu (谁主沉浮)
2004	Huanle Sangtian 欢乐桑田	Magu	
2004	Wo De Xiongdi Jiemei 我的兄弟姐妹	Ailian	
2004	Lotus Lantern 宝莲灯	Queen Mother of the West	
2004	Jingcheng Si Shao 京城四少	Ninth Aunt	
2005	Hui Niang Wan Xin 徽娘宛心	Mrs Wu	
2005	Ayou Zhengzhuan 阿有正传	Zhen Gege	
2006	The Shadow of Empress Wu 日月凌空	Wu Zetian	
2006	Chao Lin Jie 超临界	Lu Yan	
2007	Jiazu Rongyu 家族荣誉	Duan Huijun	
2007	Wang Zhaojun 王昭君	Lady Guan	
2008	Nüren Heku Weinan Nüren 女人何苦为难女人	Zhang Yuying	
2008	Lotus Lantern 宝莲灯前传	Queen Mother of the West	
2008	Yunxiu 云袖	Liang Yunxiu	
2008	Chengjiang Qingyuan 澄江情缘	Liu Guiying	
2009	Ning Xiang Jie 凝香劫	Tang Mu	
2009	Xu Beihong 徐悲鸿	Jiang Biwei	
2010	Hong Meigui Hei Meigui 红玫瑰黑玫瑰	Song Dachuan	
2011	Heroes of Sui and Tang Dynasties 1 & 2 隋唐英雄	Empress Xiao	
2011	Secret History of Empress Wu 武则天秘史	Wu Zetian (middle age)	
2011	Yangnü 养女	Liu Jianying	
2014	Heroes of Sui and Tang Dynasties 3 & 4	Ouyang Feiyan	
