= Golden Phoenix Awards =

Chinese film awards ceremony

- Awarded for: Excellence in film and television by members of the China Film Performance Art Academy
- Country: China
- Presented by: China Film Performance Art Academy
- First award: 1987

Golden Phoenix Awards (simplified Chinese: 金凤凰奖; traditional Chinese: 金鳳凰獎; pinyin: Jīnfènghuáng Jiǎng) is a bi-annual accolade given by the China Film Performance Art Academy to recognize outstanding performances in film. In 1987, the first annual awards ceremony held in Guangzhou.

Because the Society Award is the only regular category that judges the actors' performances, there are multiple winners in the category. Honorary Awards are given to actors aged 60–70, while the Lifetime Achievement Award is given to actors who are over 80 years old. Since 2005, actors from Taiwan and Hong Kong have also eligible for awards.

The statuette is in a shape of phoenix, designed by artist Han Meilin.

== Categories ==
- Academy Award (表演学会奖/Society Award)
- Special Jury Award (评委会特别奖)
- New Actors Award (新人奖)
- Honorary Award (特别荣誉奖)
- Lifetime Achievement Award (终身成就奖)
