= Golden Rooster Award for Best Animation =

Chinese Film Awards

Golden Rooster Awards for Best Animation
- Awarded for: Best Animation film
- Country: China
- Presented by: China Film Association; China Federation of Literary and Art Circles; Xiamen Municipal People's Government; 1905.com
- First award: 1981
- Final award: 2023
- Winner (2023): Chang'an
- Website: Golden Rooster Awards

The Golden Rooster Award for Best Animation (中国电影金鸡奖最佳美术片) is a category of competition of the Golden Rooster Awards. The category has been a part of the awards since the first one in 1981.

== Award Winners & Nominees ==
Notes:

- The winner in each year is shown with a blue background.

Year	Film
2025	Ne Zha 2 / 哪吒之魔童闹海
2024	Dragonkeeper / 守龙者
2023	Chang'an / 长安三万里
2022	Boonie Bears: Back to Earth / 熊出没·重返地球
2021	White Snake 2: The Tribulation of the Green Snake / 白蛇2：青蛇劫起
2020	Ne Zha / 哪吒之魔童降世
2019	The Wind Guardians / 风语咒
2017	Dear Tutu Food Rhapsody / 大耳朵图图之美食狂想曲
2017	Boonie Bears: Entangled Worlds / 熊出没·奇幻空间
2015	Monkey King: Hero Is Back/西游记之大圣归来
2013	The Ultimate Task /终极大冒险
2011	Legend of a Rabbit/兔侠传奇
2009	The Magic Aster/马兰花
2009	Finding The Milu King:The Magic Reel/麋鹿王
2009	Ma Xiaotiao/淘气包马小跳
2007	Warriors/勇士
2007	Little Soldier Zhang Ga
2007	Carnival of The Animals
2005	The Butterfly Lovers/梁山伯与祝英台
2005	Lotus/荷
2005	The Children of Captain Grant/格兰特船长的儿女
2005	Thru the Moebius Strip
1999	Lotus Lantern (寶蓮燈)
1998	蝶雙飛
1997	百衣鳥
1996	自古英雄出少年, Little Heroes
1995	白色的蛋
1994	鹿女
1991	雁陣
1989	Feeling from Mountain and Water (山水情)
1987	超級肥皂, Super Soap
1986	金猴降妖, The Monkey King Conquers the Demon
1985	火童, Fire Child
1984	The Fight Between the Snipe and the Clam (鷸蚌相爭), directed by Hu Jinqing
1983	The Deer's Bell (鹿鈴)
1981	Three Monks (三個和尚)

== See also ==
- List of animation awards
