= Tang Yixin =

Chinese actress and singer

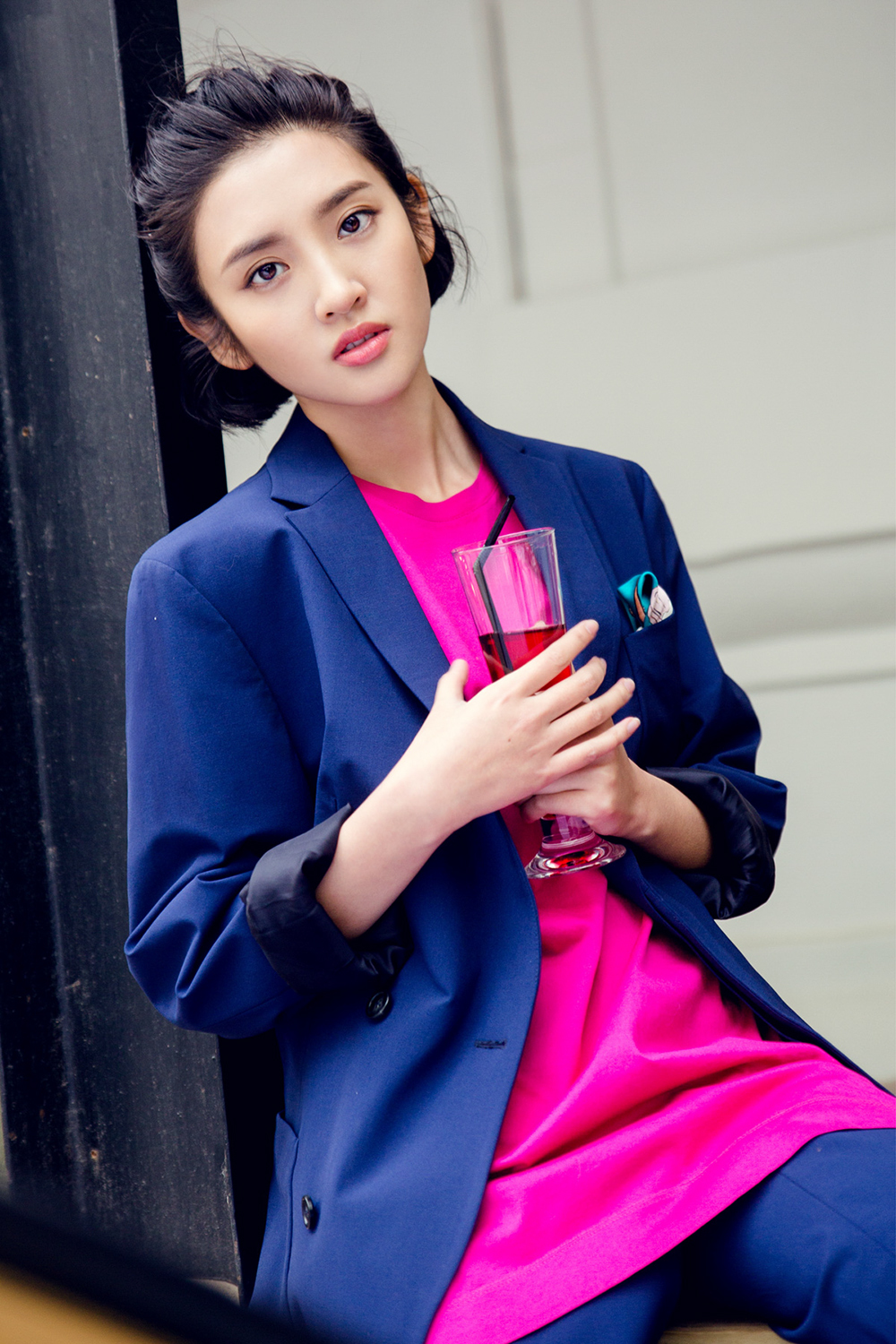
- Tang in 2016
- Born: 唐婷; Táng Tíng; 9 December 1987 (age 38); Suining, Sichuan, China
- Education: Chongqing Technology and Business University
- Occupations: Actress; singer
- Years active: 2011–present
- Spouse: Zhang Ruoyun (m. 2019)
- Children: 1

Chinese name
- Traditional Chinese: 唐藝昕
- Simplified Chinese: 唐艺昕
Transcriptions
Standard Mandarin
- Hanyu Pinyin: Táng Yìxīn

Tang Yixin (Chinese: 唐艺昕), born Tang Ting (Chinese: 唐婷, 9 December 1987), also known as Tina Tang, is a Chinese actress and singer.

== Career ==
Tang began her career when she was picked by Zheng Xiaolong to play the role of Concubine Qi in Empresses in the Palace (2012).

In 2013, her role as Luo Cheng (played by Hans Zhang)'s lover in Heroes in Sui and Tang Dynasties received positive reviews from the audience, who said that her character was "refreshing" in a serious historical drama. She then played well-received supporting turns in Legend of Lu Zhen and Noble Bride: Regretless Love, which achieved the highest and second highest ratings respectively for the first half of 2013. Tang also had a minor role in Stephen Chow's fantasy blockbuster hit Journey to the West: Conquering the Demons.

Thereafter Tang starred in television series Refueling Lover (and its sequel Happy Lover), The Love of Happiness and the coming-of-age film Les Aventures d'Anthony.

In 2016, Tang co-starred in the xianxia drama Noble Aspirations. The drama was a hit and recorded the highest online views for 2016.

In 2017, she starred in historical drama The Advisors Alliance, playing Guo Zhao. The same year, she played the leading role in the palace drama Rule the World co-starring Raymond Lam.

== Personal life ==
Tang and actor Zhang Ruoyun revealed their relationship through Weibo on 2 August 2017. Tang and Zhang married in Ireland on 27 June 2019.

== Filmography ==
=== Film ===
Year	English title	Chinese title	Role	Notes/Ref.
2013	Journey to the West: Conquering the Demons	西游·降魔篇	Blossom	
2013	The Same Root	同根生		
2014	The Golden Era	黄金时代	Cheng Juan	
2015	Les Aventures d'Anthony	陪安东尼度过漫长岁月	Xiao Xuan	
2015	This Is Me	年少轻狂	Tian Dengdeng	
2016	I Love That Crazy Little Thing	那件疯狂的小事叫爱情	Meng Xiaoyan	
2019	Jade Dynasty	诛仙	Tian Ling'er	Special appearance
2020	The Eight Hundred	八佰	Yang Huimin	

=== Television series ===
Year	English title	Chinese title	Role	Notes/Ref.
2011	Empresses in the Palace	后宫·甄嬛传	Noble lady Qi	
2012	The Queen of SOP	胜女的代价	Su Li	
2013	Heroes in Sui and Tang Dynasties	隋唐演义	Shan Yingying	
2013	Noble Bride: Regretless Love	百万新娘之爱无悔	Ye Ling	
2013	Legend of Lu Zhen	陆贞传奇	Shen Bi	
2014	Refueling Lover	加油爱人	Ren Muyan	
2014	Happy Lover	幸福爱人	Ren Muyan	
2015	Legend of Fragrance	活色生香	Xiang Xueyin	Cameo
2015	Get Married	新上错花轿	Yang Yunyou	
2016	Legend of Nine Tails Fox	青丘狐传说	Zhong Qing	
2016	The Love of Happiness	因为爱情有幸福	Lu Xiaonan	
2016	Noble Aspirations	青云志	Tian Ling'er	
2016	Noble Aspirations 2	青云志2	Tian Ling'er	
2017	Tai-chi Master: The Ultimate Gateway	太极宗师之太极门	Liu Yingchun	
2017	Psychologist	心理师	Ouyang Xin	
2017	The Advisors Alliance	军师联盟	Guo Zhao	
2017	Rule the World	独步天下	Bu Youran / Yehe Nara Buxiyamala / Borjigit Harjol	
2020	The Deer and the Cauldron	鹿鼎记	Jian Ning	
2021	The Bond	乔家的儿女	Xiang Nanfang	
2021	Xiaomin's Home	小敏家	Liu Xiaojie	
2022	Miss Buyer	买定离手我爱你	Ding Yike	
2023	In Later Years	熟年	Liu Hongyan	
2023	For the First Time in My Life	今生也是第一次	Chen Lanqing	
TBA	Once Loved You Distressed Forever	我曾爱过你想起就心酸	Li Xiang	

=== Variety show ===
Year	English title	Chinese title	Notes/Ref.
2017	Up Idol Season 2	我们来了第二季	
2017	Dream House	漂亮的房子	

== Discography ==
=== Albums ===
Year	English title	Chinese title	Notes
2016	Miss Orange	香橙小姐	

=== Singles ===
Year	English title	Chinese title	Album	Notes
2016	"Light"	灯	Love of Happiness OST	
