= Noble Consort Ying =

Mongol imperial consort of Qing China (1731–1800)

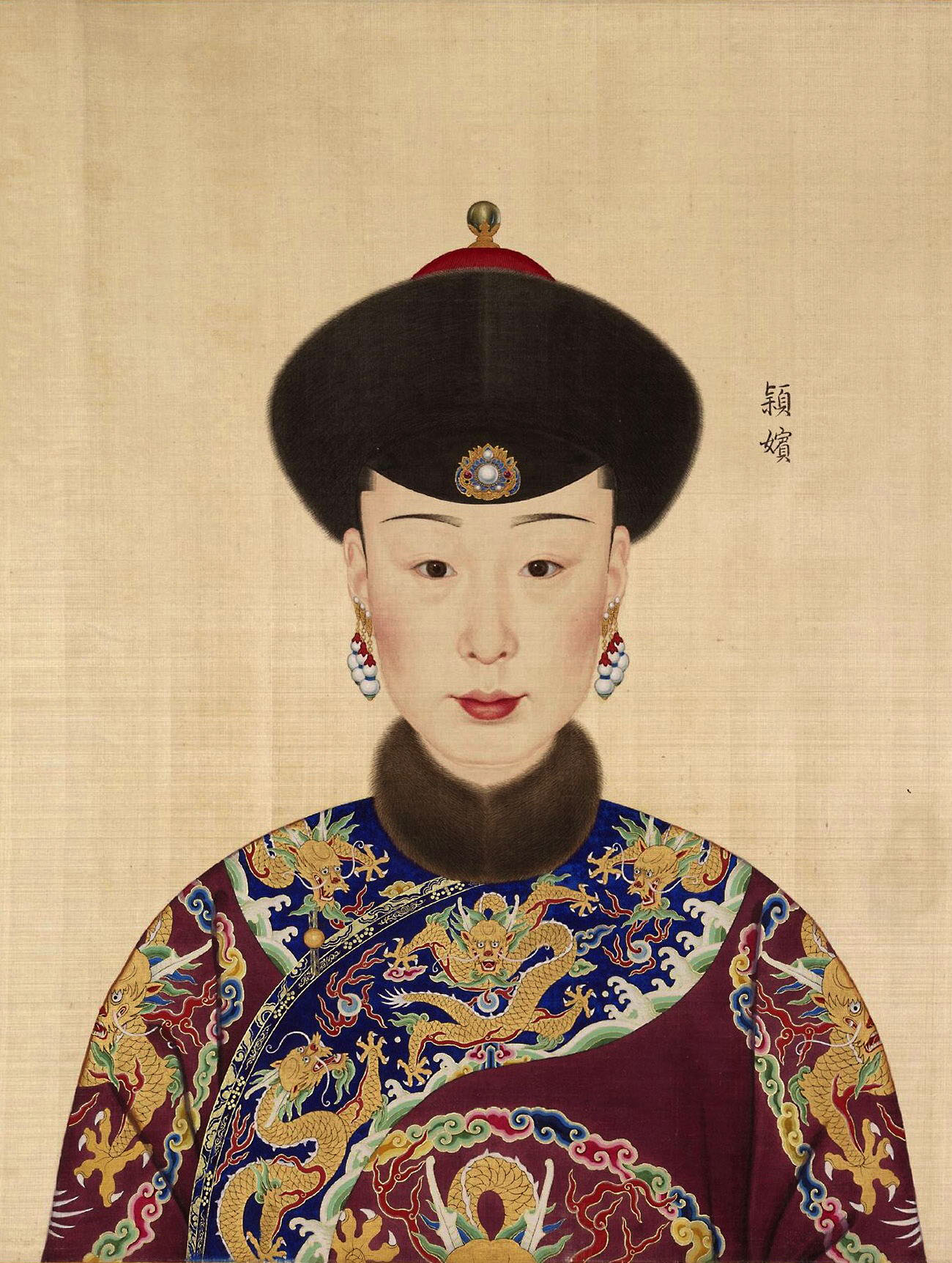
- Qing Dynasty portrait of Noble Consort Ying
- Born: 7 March 1731 (雍正九年 正月 二十九日)
- Died: 14 March 1800 (aged 69) (嘉慶五年 二月 十九日); Forbidden City
- Burial: Yu Mausoleum, Eastern Qing tombs
- Spouse: Qianlong Emperor (died 1799)
- House: Barin (巴林; by birth); Aisin Gioro (by marriage)
- Father: Naqin

Noble Consort Ying
- Traditional Chinese: 穎貴妃
- Simplified Chinese: 颖贵妃
Transcriptions
Standard Mandarin
- Hanyu Pinyin: Yǐng Guìfēi

Noble Consort Ying (7 March 1731 – 14 March 1800), of the Mongol Bordered Red Banner Barin clan, was a consort of the Qianlong Emperor of the Qing dynasty. She was 20 years his junior.

== Life ==
=== Family background ===
Noble Consort Ying's personal name was not recorded in history.

- Father: Naqin (納親), served as a first rank military official (都統), and held the title of a master commandant of light chariot (輕車都尉)

=== Yongzheng era ===
The future Noble Consort Ying was born on the 29th day of the first lunar month in the ninth year of the reign of the Yongzheng Emperor, which translates to 7 March 1731 in the Gregorian calendar.

=== Qianlong era ===
It is not known when Lady Barin entered the Forbidden City and was granted the title "Noble Lady" by the Qianlong Emperor. She was demoted to "First Class Female Attendant Na" in 1748 for unknown reasons but was restored as "Noble Lady" shortly after. She was elevated on 30 July 1751 to "Concubine Ying", and on 4 February 1760 to "Consort Ying". Lady Barin never had children.

=== Jiaqing era ===
On 9 February 1796, the Qianlong Emperor abdicated in favour of his 15th son Yongyan, who was enthroned as the Jiaqing Emperor. However, the Qianlong Emperor remained in power as a Retired Emperor. In November or December 1798, the Qianlong Emperor issued an imperial decree promoting Lady Barin to "Noble Consort Ying". The Jiaqing Emperor honoured Lady Barin as "Dowager Noble Consort Ying" and let her and Dowager Noble Consort Wan live in Shoukang Palace (壽康宮).

In 1800, during Lady Barin's 70th birthday, Yonglin, the Jiaqing Emperor's only full brother who was raised by Lady Barin, sent her birthday gifts. Lady Barin had no children of her own and had been leading a rather lonely life in the palace, so she was very happy to see Yonglin. However, the Jiaqing Emperor was furious when he found out, and he scolded his brother for not seeking his permission first. Lady Barin's birthday celebrations were thus rendered meaningless. She died on 14 March 1800. In 1801, she was interred in the Yu Mausoleum of the Eastern Qing tombs.

== Titles ==
- During the reign of the Yongzheng Emperor (r. 1722–1735):
  - Lady Barin (from 7 March 1731)
- During the reign of the Qianlong Emperor (r. 1735–1796):
  - Noble Lady (貴人), sixth rank consort
  - First Attendant Na (那常在; from January/February 1748), seventh rank consort
  - Noble Lady Na (那貴人; from May/June 1748), sixth rank consort
  - Concubine Ying (穎嬪; from 30 July 1751), fifth rank consort
  - Consort Ying (穎妃; from 4 February 1760), fourth rank consort
- During the reign of the Jiaqing Emperor (r. 1796–1820):
  - Noble Consort Ying (穎貴妃; from November/December 1798), third rank consort

== In fiction and popular culture ==
- Portrayed by Angelina Lo in Succession War (2018)
- Portrayed by Liu Lu in Story of Yanxi Palace (2018)
- Portrayed by Zhang Jianing in Ruyi's Royal Love in the Palace (2018)

== See also ==
- Ranks of imperial consorts in China#Qing
- Royal and noble ranks of the Qing dynasty
