= Li Yitong (actress) =

Chinese actress and singer

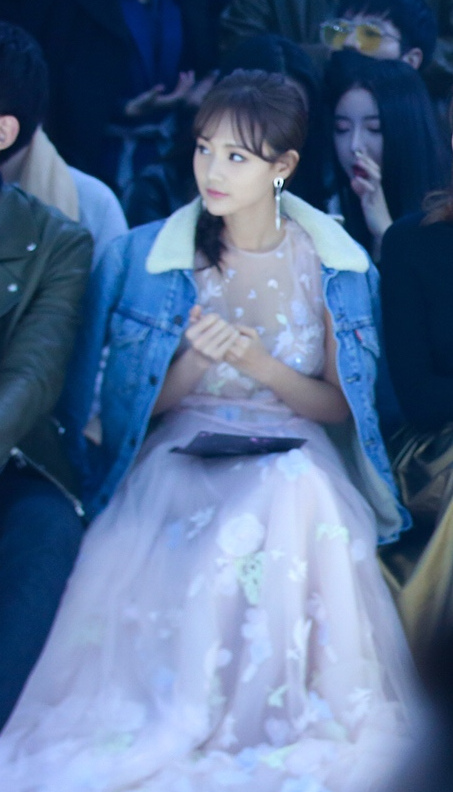
- Li in 2016
- Born: Li Xue (李雪); September 6, 1990 (age 36); Jinan, Shandong, China
- Education: Beijing Dance Academy
- Occupations: Actress; singer
- Years active: 2015–present
- Agent: Star Times

Chinese name
- Chinese: 李一桐
Transcriptions
Standard Mandarin
- Hanyu Pinyin: Lǐ Yītóng

Li Yitong (Chinese: 李一桐, born September 6, 1990), also known as Shirley or Li Xue (Chinese: 李雪), is a Chinese actress and singer. She is best known for her roles as Wan Mei, an assassin in the 2018 Chinese television series Bloody Romance, Huang Rong in 2017 TV series The Legend of the Condor Heroes, Lu Wenxi (Abao) in the 2019 Chinese television series Royal Nirvana, Fu Rou in the 2021 Chinese television series Court Lady, and Song Yimeng / Song Xiaoyu in 2025 historical romance television series A Dream Within a Dream.

== Early life and education ==
Li Yitong was born Li Xue in Jinan, Shandong. She started dancing when she was almost ten by taking amateur-level classes. Under the recommendation of a teacher, she later applied and was admitted to the Shenzhen Art School at the age of 12. She received her bachelor's degree from the Beijing Dance Academy, China's leading dance institution, where she majored in folk dance. Prior to becoming an actress, Li wanted to start a business of tea house into which she could merge elements of dance performance. But after once helping out her friends in film school for a microcinema, she was fascinated and decided to pursue a career in acting.

== Career ==
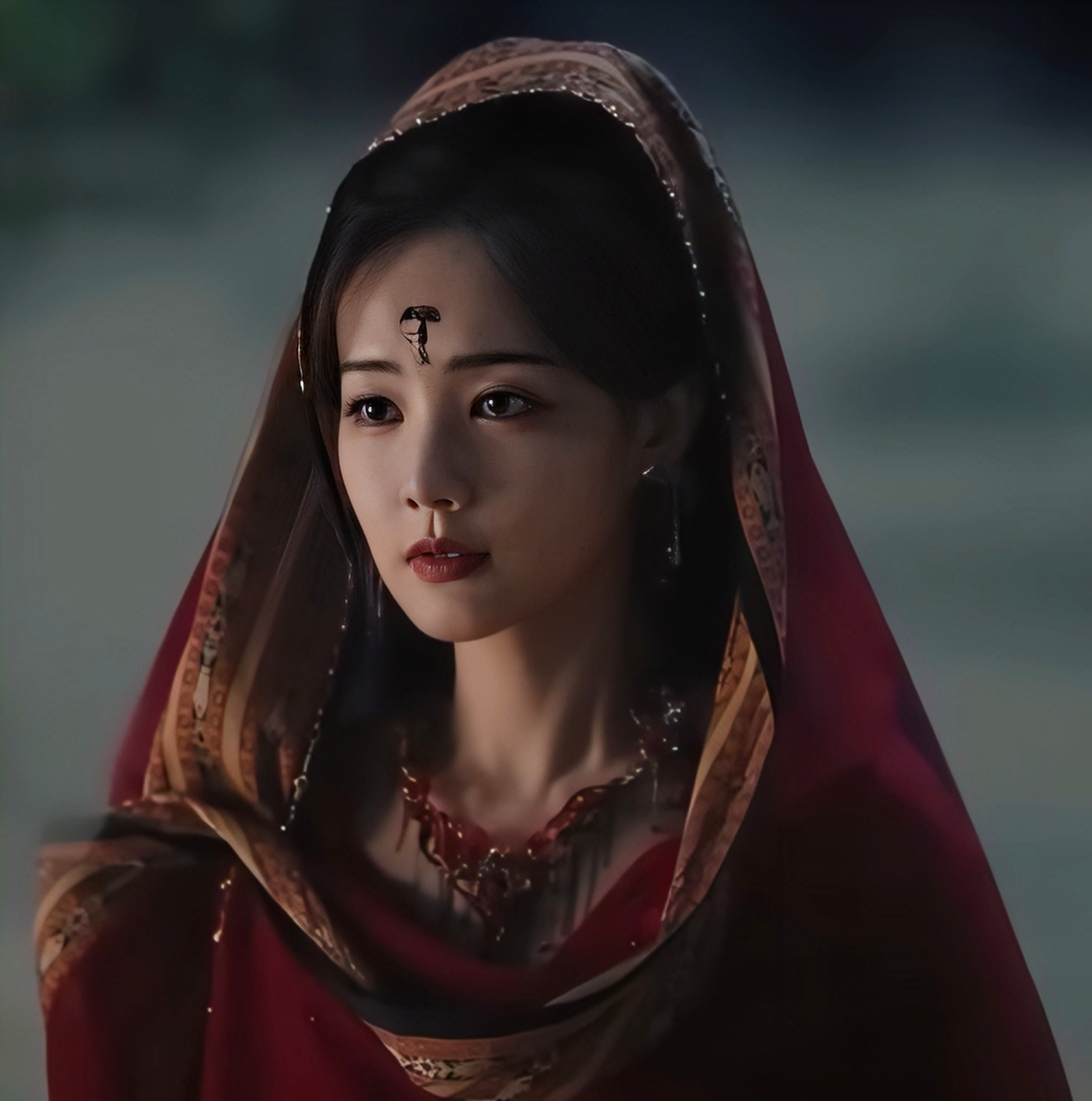
Li for the series Sword and Beloved

In 2016, Li made her acting debut with a leading role in the period fantasy web series Demon Girl by Yu Zheng.

In 2017, she played Huang Rong in the television adaptation of Jin Yong's wuxia novel Legend of the Condor Heroes and rose to fame in China.

In 2018, Li starred in the wuxia romance web series Bloody Romance, playing the lead role of an assassin named Wan Mei. She also recorded one of the drama's theme songs. The series was a major commercial success and passed 600 million views online by August 2018. The same year, she made her big-screen debut in the comedy film Keep Calm and Be a Superstar.

In 2019, Li starred in the period romance drama Blossom in Heart alongside Deng Lun, historical political drama Royal Nirvana alongside Luo Jin, and wuxia drama Sword Dynasty alongside Li Xian.

In 2020, Li starred in fantasy romance film Love You Forever, and modern romance drama Don't Think Twice, Love's All Right alongside Chen Jianbin.

In 2021, she starred in the fantasy romance drama Court Lady, playing the female lead role Fu Rou, a seamstress.

== Filmography ==
=== Film ===
Year	English title	Chinese title	Role	Notes/Ref.
2013	Juzi and Luoxing	橘子与罗兴	Ju Zi	Short film
2018	Keep Calm and Be a Superstar	卧底巨星	Tong Tong	
2020	Love You Forever	我在时间尽头等你	Qiu Qian	
2022	I, Butterfly	制造偶像	Zhang Xiao Miao	Short film

=== Television series ===
Year	English title	Original title	Role	Network	Notes	Ref.
2016	Demon Girl	半妖倾城	Nie Qingcheng	Mango TV		
2016	Demon Girl 2	半妖倾城2	Nie Qingcheng	Mango TV		
2017	The Legend of the Condor Heroes	射雕英雄传	Huang Rong	Dragon TV		
2018	Bloody Romance	媚者无疆	Qi Xue / Wan Mei	Youku		
2019	Blossom in Heart	海棠经雨胭脂透	Gu Haitang	Mango TV		
2019	Royal Nirvana	鹤唳华亭	Lu Wenxi / Gu Ahbao	Youku		
2019	Sword Dynasty	剑王朝	Zhangsun Qianxue / Gongsun Qianxue	iQIYI		
2020	Don't Think Twice, Love's All Right	爱我就别想太多	Xia Keke	Beijing TV, Dragon TV		
2020	Just to See You	只为那一刻与你相见	Xia Ranran	Dragon TV		
2020	Dear Missy	了不起的女孩	Lu Ke	iQIYI		
2021	Dt. Appledog's Time	我的时代，你的时代	Ai Qing (Appledog)	iQIYI		
2021	Court Lady	骊歌行	Fu Rou	iQIYI, Tencent		
2021	Faith Makes Great	理想照耀中国	Shen Fujia	Hunan TV		
2022	Glory of Special Forces	特战荣耀	Ai Qianxue	Dragon TV, Zhejiang TV		
2022	Love Between Fairy and Devil	苍兰诀	Si Ming	iQIYI	Cameo	
2022	My Deepest Dream	乌云遇皎月	Tan Jiao	Tencent		
2023	The Knockout	狂飙	Meng Yu	CCTV-8, iQIYI		
2023	Warm on a Cold Night	九霄寒夜暖	Su Jiu'er	iQIYI		
2023	Hi Producer	正好遇见你	Lin Haishan	iQIYI, Tencent		
2023	Spy Game	特工任务	Yaoyao	iQIYI		
2024	Tell No One	不可告人	Zheng Dongyu	iQIYI		
2025	A Dream Within a Dream	书卷一梦	Song Yimeng / Song Xiaoyu	iQIYI, Jiangsu TV		
2025	Sword and Beloved	天地剑心	Qing Tong / "12580"	iQIYI		
2026	The Legend of Rosy Clouds	云秀行	Fan Yun	iQIYI		
2026	A Prophet	长风起	Jiang Feiyan	iQiyi, Tencent		
2026	The Vanishing Beauty	美人余	Yu Meng	Tencent		
TBA	The Melody of Love	古乐风华录	Yue Yangyang	Tencent		
TBA	The Noble	金枝	Zhao Jinzhi / Chen Que'er	Tencent		
TBA	Hero Legends	英雄志	Gu Qianxi	CCTV-8, Tencent		

== Discography ==
=== Singles ===
Year	English title	Chinese title	Album	Notes/Ref.
2017	"Mini-Lightning"	迷你闪电		
2018	"Disfavored"	失宠	Bloody Romance OST	
2019	"Qian Xue"	浅雪	Sword Dynasty OST	
2020	"Falling in Love with You Before Meeting"	在相遇之前爱上你	Love You Forever OST	
2025	"I'm a Little Fish"	这条小鱼在乎	I'm a Little Fish	

== Awards and nominations ==
Year	Award	Category	Nominated work	Result	Ref.
2017	2nd China Quality Television Drama Ceremony	New Star Award	The Legend of the Condor Heroes	Won	
2017	6th iQiyi All-Star Carnival	Television Newcomer of the Year	—N/a	Won	
2017	China TV Guide	Most Influential Television Newcomer	Demon Girl; The Legend of the Condor Heroes	Won	
2018	QQ Interest Group Appreciation Night	New Female Artist Award	Demon Girl; The Legend of the Condor Heroes	Won	
2019	6th The Actors of China Award Ceremony	Best Actress (Emerald Category)	—N/a	Nominated	
2019	Golden Bud – The Fourth Network Film And Television Festival	Best Actress	Blossom in Heart, Royal Nirvana	Nominated	
2019	Weibo Movie Awards Ceremony	Most Anticipated Film Newcomer	Love You Forever	Won	
2020	7th The Actors of China Award Ceremony	Best Actress (Emerald)	—N/a	Nominated	
2020	29th Huading Award	Best Actress	Royal Nirvana	Nominated	
