= Bloody Romance =

2018 Chinese TV series

- Promotional poster
- Genre: Fantasy; Adventure; Romance
- Based on: Bloody Romance by Banming Banmei
- Written by: Banming Banmei
- Directed by: Yi Jun
- Starring: Li Yitong; Qu Chuxiao
- Country of origin: China
- Original language: Mandarin
- No. of episodes: 36

Production
- Producer: Zhang Wei
- Production location: Hengdian World Studios
- Running time: ≈45 minutes per episode
- Production companies: Youku; Moon Blossom

Original release
- Network: Youku
- Release: July 24, 2018

Bloody Romance (媚者无疆) is a 2018 Chinese television series based on the novel of the same name by Banming Banmei (半明半寐). It airs on Youku on July 24, 2018, which stars Li Yitong and Qu Chuxiao as the leads. The series air internationally in 13 foreign countries via Youku and Dramafever.

The series was a commercial success and passed 600 million views online by August 2018. It was praised for its tight plot and high production quality despite a low budget, as well as for featuring a strong female lead.

== Synopsis ==
A story about a young woman who was exploited in the past, having gone through hell and back to become an assassin.

During the chaotic period towards the end of the Tang dynasty, Su Qixue accidentally enters a mysterious organization called Gui Hua City and was given the name Wan Mei. Tasked with dangerous missions, she puts herself in danger for each task but gains the protection of Chang An, a mysterious man, as a shadow. The two become embroiled in a greater conspiracy involving a deadly struggle for power.

== Gui Hua City ==
Gui Hua City was originally a secret service established by Empress Wu Zetian of the Zhou dynasty. After her abdication, she turned it into an assassin business. The organization has existed for hundreds of years.

=== Hierarchical structure ===
- Earthly Assassin candidate (地殺備選): 6 positions. Upon approval from the Magnate to stay, they choose a Shadow and prepare to compete for an Earthly Assassin position when a vacancy arises. Current candidates are Wan Chun, Wan Xia, Wan Qiu, Wan Dong, Wan Xiang and Wan Mei.
- Earthly Assassin (地殺): 12 positions. The lowest-ranked assassins, they rely on beauty and intelligence rather than martial arts to complete missions. Each inducted disha assassin receives an umbrella containing a blood bug, which absorbs the blood of their victims and marks a golden Musella lasiocarpa flower on the umbrella. After ten successful missions, the assassin gains a blood bug from the tenth flower, enhancing their powers and promoting them to Tiansha assassin.
- Heavenly Assassin (天殺): 4 positions. Higher-ranked than Earthly assassins, Heavenly assassins are trained in martial arts and enjoy more freedom. Current Heavenly Assassins include Cha Wu, Xiu Ru, Yan Qin, and others.
- Supreme Assassin (絕殺): 1 position. They can challenge the Magnate to become the new leader. Current Supreme Assassin is Liu Guang, and as an exception Yue Ying.
- Magnate (城主): 1 position. Oversees the entire Gui Hua City. Upon a successful challenge by a Supreme Assassin, the new Magnate enacts brutal revenge on the predecessor. Current Magnate is Cha Luo.
- Chief (主人): 1 position. The owner of Gui Hua City. Current Chief is Gong Zi.
- Shadow (殺手影子): Unnumbered positions. Shadows live, train and go on missions together with their assassin masters. If their master dies and he can't find a new master within seven days, the Shadow will be put to death. Current Shadows are Chang'an, Feng Zhu, Er Tue, Chu Shi Yi, and others.
- Bailiff (刑堂主): 1 position. Current Bailiff is Xing Feng.
- Qiantong (千瞳): Unnumbered positions. Responsible for monitoring, control, and tests.
- Servant (待者) and cook (廚娘): Nearly a hundred positions. Handle cleaning, cooking, and other household tasks.

=== Key locations ===
The organization consists of the following locations:

- Yunjing Court (雲璟館): The lowest place of Gui Hua City. The entry-level residence for candidates competing to become Tiansha assassins. Servants and cooks live at the backside and are not allowed to leave.
- Disha Court (地殺院): The residence for Disha assassins.
- Tiansha Court (天殺院): Located on the mountainside, the residence for Tiansha assassins.
- Juesha Court (絕殺院): The residence for Juesha assassins.
- Tingzhu Court (聽竹院): The Chief's residence.
- Chuixing Building (吹杏樓): The Magnate's residence.
- Ancestral Hall (祠堂): A neglected temple where names of former Magnates are inscribed on a paper and dumped there, as no one is allowed to worship them.
- Jigu House (璣骨閣): A white-roofed building housing makeup artists and tailors. It provides makeup, clothing, and daily essentials. Currently managed by Liu Guang.
- Suiguzi Pavilion (碎骨子軒): A green-hallway building for pharmacists and physicians who stock herbs and make potions.
- Justice Hall (刑堂): The place for administering rewards and punishments, overseen by the Bailiff. Currently managed by Xing Feng.
- Bi'an Palace (彼岸殿): The location of the Death Pond, where fluorescent blood bugs reside and deceased assassins’ umbrellas hang. Newly inducted Disha assassins receive their umbrellas here. Shadows are not permitted to enter.

== Cast ==
=== Gui Hua City ===
- Wang Le Le as Lan Qin / Lan He
  - Gui Hua City's former Chief, Gong Zi's mother.
- Wang Duo as Gong Zi / Li Si Yuan (Duke of Ning)
  - Gui Hua City's Chief, who has long been blind and lived with Yue Ying since childhood when his mother died.
- Jill Hsu as Cha Luo
  - Gui Hua City's 13th Magnate, is in love with Xing Feng and hates Wan Mei.
- Li Zifeng as Xing Feng
  - Gui Hua City's Bailiff and Cha Luo's loyal shadow, is in love with Cha Luo.
- Wei Lu as Cha Ru
  - Former Supreme Assassin. Entered Gui Hua City in the same batch as Cha Luo and Cha Wu.
- Puff Kuo as Liu Guang
  - Supreme Assassin under Cha Luo who likes Chang An.
- Yanting Ma as Yue Ying
  - Supreme Assassin who has always been supporting Gong Zi since young. No bleeding record in story except cutting her palm for Gong Zi.
- Chai Ou as Cha Wu
  - Heavenly Assassin. Wan Xiang's mother. Entered Gui Hua City in the same batch as Cha Luo and Cha Wu.
- Li Yitong as Wan Mei / Su Qixue
  - An 18-year-old girl sold to Qinglou Brothel by her father for 2 bags of rice. Picked by Yue Ying and named Wan Mei. Becomes the 14th leader of Gui Hua City in the end.
- Zhuo Yuxi as Wan Xiang
  - Earthly Assassin who later becomes a Heavenly Assassin after killing Cha Wu. Hates Wan Mei and sees her as competitor.
- Qu Chuxiao as Chang An / Xie Huan
  - Wan Mei's Shadow. A descendant of Tang's dynasty imperial clan, hailing from the lineage of Princess Taiping. The Xie family saved him so that he could revive the former Tang dynasty as the rightful successor using the Wordless Steel left by Wu Zetian.
- Meng Wei as Er Yue
  - Wan Xiang's Shadow.
- Peng Qi as Chu Shi Yi
  - Liu Guang's Shadow.
- Jin Bang Yi as Chu Shi
  - Liu Guang's former Shadow.
- Zhou Yun Ru as Liu Zhi
  - Worker from Jigu House
- Liang Ye Wen as You Lian
  - Assassin

=== Government ===
- Su Xiaoding as Li Cunxu
  - Emperor of the Later Tang dynasty
- Zhao Leiqi as Eunuch Yu
  - The Emperor's closest eunuch.
- Yin Zhusheng as Yue Qing Ya
  - Taifu of the Later Tang dynasty, the Blood Lotus Clan's Hierarch
- Li Yixuan as Ruan Niang / Xie Ying
  - Eldest lady of the Xie family, owner of Zhai Xing Building
- Geng Li Shu as Commander Li
  - Imperial Troops Commander
- Zhang Yong as prison guard.

=== Missions ===
- Mark Han as Huang Yong (General Huang)
  - General of Da Liang army. Attempts to rape Wan Mei. Killed by Liu Guang.
- Gao Xin as Shen Mo
  - Physician. Wan Mei's first target for assassination.
- Ge Zheng as Han Yue
  - Han Xiu's younger brother. Intervenes during Wan Mei's mission to kill the doctor and his brother
- Li Jian as Fang Ge
  - Highly skilled martial artist in jianghu.
- Zhang Tian Yang as Han Xiu
  - Salt tycoon.
- Zhang Shi Tong as Zhang Zhong
  - Han Yue and Han Xiu's friend
- Ran Chen as Peony
  - Prostitute, Han Xiu's lover
- Chen Wei as Granny
  - Resident of Ling City, helps take care of the heavily injured Wan Mei after her prison escape, gets infected by the plague.
- Gu Yuhan as Shrimp
  - A waif in Ling City
- Zhao Hong Wu as He Ba
  - Governor of Ling City
- Wang Yifan as Lan Ruo
  - Yue Qingya's adopted son, Blood Lotus Clan's Interim Hierarch. Likes You Chan.
- Liu Mengmeng as You Chan
  - Warden of Blood Lotus Clan. Only survivor of Ding Shan Clan when the Blood Lotus Clan assassinated her clan. Lan Ruo's lover.
- Ma Jing Jing as Qin Yu Sang
  - Fang Ge's friend
- Zhang Xin Yan as Fang Ying Ying
  - Fang Ge's sister
- Wang Xi Yan as Mrs. Fang
  - Fang Ge's wife
- Bai Dong Feng as Butler Ji
- Du Yu Ming as Huang Yu
- Zhu Chun Jing as Huang Yu's wife
- Li Ming Yuan as San Shi Liu
  - Huang Yu's disciple

=== Others ===
- Liu Xu as Mr. Su
  - Wan Mei's father
- Sheng Zihang as Xiao Ba
  - Wan Mei's younger brother
- Kong Qili as Gu Lang

== Production ==
The series is produced by established director. Xu Jizhou, as well as Zhang Wei. Guo Yong (Ip Man) is the martial arts director while Di Kun (Love O2O) is the production/arts director.

Filming mainly took place in Hengdian from September 2017 to January 2018.

== Soundtrack ==
Bloody Romance Original Soundtrack (OST)

Soundtrack album by Various Artists
- Released: August 17, 2018
- Genre: Mandopop; Ballad
- Language: Mandarin
- Producer: Dong Dongdong

Bloody Romance Original Soundtrack was released with 31 tracks over 2 discs, with instrumentals composed by Dong Dongdong.

| No. | Title | Lyrics | Music | Singers | Length |
|---|---|---|---|---|---|
| 1. | "Waiting For You (一生等你)" (Opening theme song) | Chen Xi | Chen Xi, Dongdong Dong | Tia Ray (袁娅维) | 03:36 |
| 2. | "Disfavored (失宠)" (Ending theme song) | Chen Xi | Dongdong Dong | Li Yitong | 3:39 |
| 3. | "One (一)" | Chen Xi | Dongdong Dong | Cao Ge | 3:52 |
| 4. | "One Step (独步)" | Chen Xi | Dongdong Dong | Cui Zige | 3:53 |
| 5. | "Waiting For You (一生等你) (Male version)" | | | Qu Chuxiao (屈楚萧) | 3:31 |

== Awards and nominations ==
| Award | Category | Nominated work | Result | Ref. |
|---|---|---|---|---|
| 24th Huading Awards | Best Newcomer | Qu Chuxiao | Nominated | |
| The Third Internet Film Festival | Excellent Young Actress | Xu Jie'er | Won | |
| Golden Bud - The Third Network Film And Television Festival | Top 10 Web Drama | Bloody Romance | Won | |
