= Primary Consort Minhui =

Chinese Imperial consort (1609–1641)

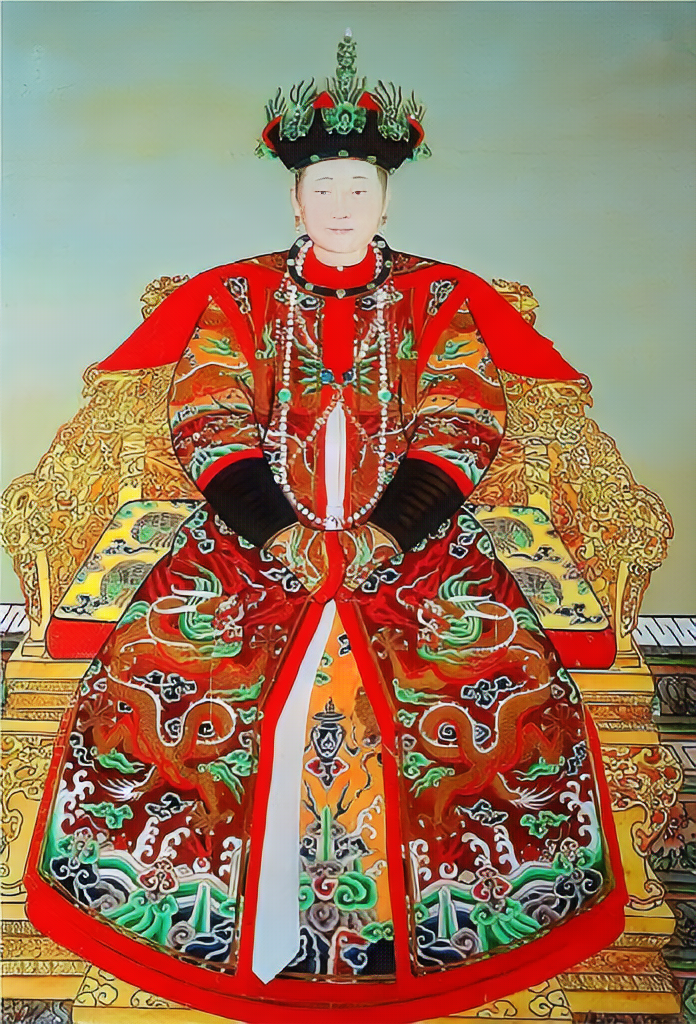
- Born: Borjigit Harjol (博爾濟吉特·海蘭珠); 1609 (萬曆三十七年)
- Died: 22 October 1641 (aged 31–32) (祟德六年 九月 十八日); Guanju Palace, Mukden Palace, Shenyang, Qing dynasty
- Burial: Zhao Mausoleum
- Spouse: Hong Taiji (m. 1634–1641)
- Issue: Eighth son
Names
- Borjigit Harjol (博爾濟吉特·海蘭珠)
Posthumous name
- Primary Consort Minhui Gonghe (敏惠恭和元妃)
- House: Borjigit (博爾濟吉特; by birth); Aisin Gioro (by marriage)

Primary Consort Minhui
- Traditional Chinese: 敏惠元妃
- Simplified Chinese: 敏惠元妃
Transcriptions
Standard Mandarin
- Hanyu Pinyin: Mǐnhuì Yuánfēi

Primary Consort Minhui (1609 – 22 October 1641), of the Khorchin Mongol Borjigit clan, personal name Harjol("Jade" in the Manchu language), was a consort of the Qing dynasty emperor Hong Taiji (Emperor Taizong). She was 17 years his junior. She was descended from Qasar, a younger brother of Genghis Khan.

== Life ==
=== Family background ===
- Father: Zhaisang (寨桑), held the title of a first rank prince (親王)
  - Paternal grandfather: Manggusi (莽古思), held the title of a first rank prince (親王)
  - Paternal aunt: Empress Xiaoduanwen (1599–1649)
- Mother: Boli (博禮; d. 1654)
- Four elder brothers
- One younger sister
  - Empress Xiaozhuangwen (1613–1688), the mother of the Shunzhi Emperor (1638–1661)

=== Tiancong era ===
In 1634, Lady Borjigit travelled to Mukden Palace in present-day Shenyang, Liaoning, in order to become one of Hong Taiji's multiple wives. Their marriage took place on 6 December 1634. Prior to this, the Khorchin Mongols had sent Hong Taiji two other women, Jerjer, the future Empress Xiaoduanwen, and Bumbutai, the future Empress Xiaozhuangwen, on 28 May 1614 and in March or April 1625 respectively, to strengthen the relationship between the Qing dynasty and the Khorchin. Lady Borjigit was 26 years old when she married Hong Taiji, placing her out of the typical age women married during that time period, which was between 13–17 years. There are no documents that conclusively prove why Lady Borjigit did not marry while she was younger, but some claims state that she had previously married a Khorchin warrior, Zhuolin (桌林), and that she married Hong Taiji after her first husband's death.

=== Chongde era ===
Lady Borjigit was deeply favoured by Hong Taiji although she did not seem to reciprocate these feelings in the early years of their marriage. Hong Taiji so favoured Lady Borjigit that when he conferred titles on his five primary spouses in August 1636, he named her "Consort Chen" of Guanju Palace (關睢宮) and gave her the position as the head of the concubines, a high ranking position that placed her just below her aunt, the Empress Jerjer. The following year, on 27 August 1637, Lady Borjigit gave birth to Hong Taiji's eighth son, who did not live long and died on 13 March 1638. Lady Borjigit was left in weak health and became seriously ill three years later. Upon hearing the news that Lady Borjigit was on her deathbed, Hong Taiji reportedly left an active battlefield to be by her side. Lady Borjigit died on 22 October 1641 and was interred in the Zhao Mausoleum. Her death devastated Hong Taiji, who spent much of his time mourning her, to the detriment of his rapidly deteriorating health, and he granted her the posthumous title "primary consort Minhui".

== Titles ==
- During the reign of the Wanli Emperor (r. 1572–1620):
  - Lady Borjigit (from 1609)
- During the reign of Hong Taiji (r. 1626–1643):
  - Secondary consort (側福晉; from 6 December 1634)
  - Consort Chen (宸妃; from August 1636), fourth rank consort (same level with the typical Imperial Noble Consort, which ranks second just below the Empress)
  - Primary consort Minhui (敏惠元妃; from November/December 1641)

== Issue ==
- As Consort Chen:
  - Hong Taiji's eighth son (27 August 1637 – 13 March 1638)

== In fiction and popular culture ==
- Portrayed by Yuen Yi-ling in The Rise and Fall of Qing Dynasty (1987)
- Portrayed by He Saifei in Xiaozhuang Mishi (2003)
- Portrayed by Chen Jianyue in Da Qing Fengyun (2006)
- Portrayed by Zhang Meng in In Love with Power (2012)
- Portrayed by He Hua in The Legend of Xiao Zhuang (2015)
- Portrayed by Tang Yixin in Rule the World (2017)

== See also ==
- Ranks of Imperial Consorts in China § Qing
- Qing Dynasty nobility
