= Chen Xinyu =

Chinese actress

- 陈欣予
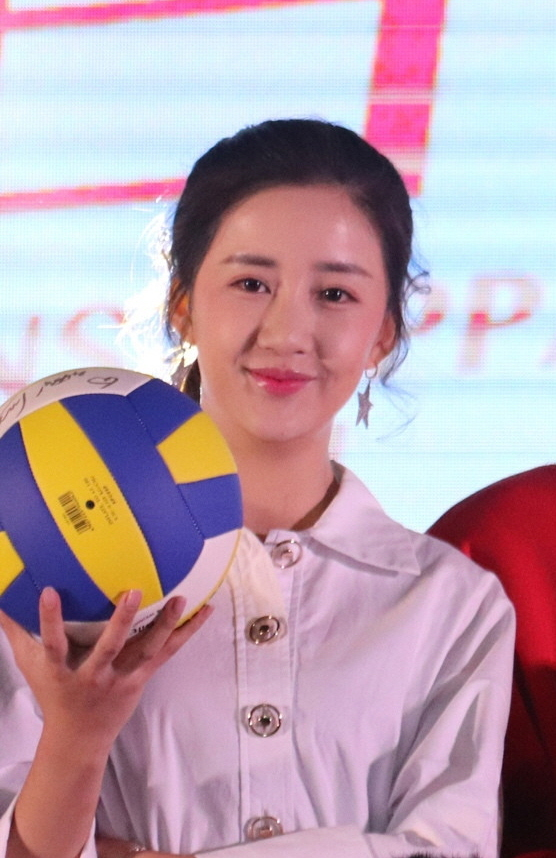
- Chen in 2017
- Born: November 24, 1993 (age 32); Shanghai, China
- Education: Shanghai Institute of Visual Art
- Occupation: Actress
- Years active: 2013–present
- Height: 168 cm (5 ft 6 in)

Chen Xinyu
- Simplified Chinese: 陈欣予
Transcriptions
Standard Mandarin
- Hanyu Pinyin: Chén Xīnyú
- Wade–Giles: Chen^{2} Xin^{1} yu^{2}

Chen Xinyu (born 24 November 1993), also known by her stage name Maggie Chen, is a Chinese actress. She made her acting debut in the TV drama The Master of the House (2013), and has since gone on to appear in numerous drama titles such as Prince of Lan Ling (2013), The Imperial Doctress (2016) and Ice Fantasy (2016).

== Early life ==
Born in Shanghai on 1993, Chen has been keen on literary and artistic activities since childhood. She attended and graduated from Shanghai Institute of Visual Art.

== Career ==
In 2013, she made her television debut in the TV drama Prince of Lan Ling. In 2014, she co-starred with Yao Qianyu and Zhai Tianlin in the drama The Master of the House, which was set in the era of Republic of China.

In 2015, she co-starred with Wallace Chung and Tang Yan in the drama My Sunshine, which was premiered on Jiangsu Satellite TV and Dragon TV. In the same year, she starred in the drama Secrets of Women, where she played Gao Fei, a magazine editor who lacks self-confidence.

In July 2016, she joined the cast of the TV series Ice Fantasy, where she played the role of Chao Ya, the Queen of the Spiritual Tribe. In the same month, she played the role of Zheng Xiaotong in the film Never Gone. It was her first appearance in big screen. In March 2017, she joined the cast of TV series Ice Fantasy Destiny, the sequel of Ice Fantasy, where she played Yang Da, the reincarnation of Chao Ya and in October of the same year, she joined the recurring cast of the series Rule the World, where she played the role of Lady Abahai, the niece of Bujantai and fourth primary consort of Nurhaci. In 2018, she joined the recurring cast of the series Summer's Desire.

In February 2019, she was cast in the TV drama Heavenly Sword and Dragon Slaying Saber, where she played the role of Yin Susu. On May 27 of the same year, she starred alongside Miao Miao in the TV drama Unstoppable Youth, until the series' finale on 2 January 2020.

In 2020, Chen joined the cast of the series My Talent Neighbor, where she played the role of Song Yiwen. In 2021, she starred alongside Chen Xingxu and Zhang Jingyi in the TV drama Fall in Love, which was broadcast in Youku.

== Filmography ==
=== Film ===
Year	Title	Role	Notes
2016	Never Gone	Zheng Xiaotong	

=== Television ===
Year	Title	Role	Notes
2023	The Longest Promise	Qiu Shui	
2023	Back From the Brink	Xiange	
2023	Little Mad Doctor	Chu Jinghong	
2022	Song Ci Shao Hua Lu	Baixue Yan	
2022	My Name is Liu Jinfeng	Liu Baiyu	
2021	Fall in Love	Gu Yueshuang	
2020	My Roommate is a Detective	Zou Jing	
2020–present	My Talent Neighbour	Song Yiwen	
2019 - 2020	Unstoppable Youth	Qiu Yanya	
2019	Princess Silver	Hen Xiang	
2019	Heavenly Sword and Dragon Slaying Sabre	Yin Susu	
2018	Summer's Desire	Yao Shu Er	
2017	Rule the World	Empress Xiaoliewu	
2017	Delicious Destiny	Ye Yilan	
2017	Ice Fantasy Destiny	Yang Da / Chao Ya	
2016	Ice Fantasy	Princess Chao Ya	
2016	Little Husband	Shan Shan	
2016	The Imperial Doctress	Du Shuyue	
2016	The Boss is Coming	-	
2015	Ladies and Boys	Tian Yi	
2015	Lady & Liar	Madam Du	
2015	My Sunshine	young Xu Ying	
2015	Po Zhen	-	
2015	Secrets of Women	Gao Fei	
2014	The Master of the House	Cheng Weifeng	
2013	Prince of Lan Ling	Missy Liu	

=== Variety shows ===
Year	Title	Role	Notes
2015	China-Korea Dream Team	Herself	
