= Les Aventures d'Anthony =

- Poster
- Chinese: 陪安東尼度過漫長歲月
- Directed by: Janet Chun
- Based on: a novel
- Produced by: Zhou Xun; Nelson Khoury
- Cinematography: Leung Ming Kai
- Music by: Dennie Wong
- Production companies: Beijing Enlight Pictures; Blueberry Pictures; Shannan Guangxian Pictures 希云森林文化（北京）有限公司
- Distributed by: Beijing Enlight Pictures; Shannan Guangxian Pictures; Huaxia Film Distribution; Shanghai Gewa Business Information Consulting
- Release date: 13 November 2015
- Running time: 121 minutes
- Country: China
- Language: Mandarin
- Box office: CN¥59.5 million

Les Aventures d'Anthony (Chinese: 陪安東尼度過漫長歲月) is a 2015 Chinese coming-of-age romantic drama film directed by Janet Chun, produced by Zhou Xun and based on a novel. It was released on 13 November 2015.

== Cast ==
- Liu Chang as Anthony / Andongni
- Vivian Sung as Xiaohei
- Bruce Hung as Pierre
- Bai Baihe as Xiao Ying
- Tang Yixin as Xiao Xuan
- Congo Pax as Jia Ming
- Jin Shijia as Fang Jie
- Jiang Yiyan as Young Mrs. Huang / Nianqing Huang Taitai
- Archie Kao as Young Mr. Huang / Nianqing Huang Xiansheng
- Pan Hong as Anthony's Mother
- Yu Rongguang as Anthony's Father
- Lisa Lu as Mrs. Huang / Huang Taitai
- Seina Tsukimori as Japanese student

== Reception ==
The film grossed CN¥40.2 million on its opening weekend.
