= Rule the World (TV series) =

- Genre: Romance; Historical fiction
- Based on: Du Bu Tian Xia by Li Xin
- Directed by: Zhao Jinghui
- Starring: Raymond Lam; Tang Yixin; Zhang Rui; Jing Gangshan; Li Zhinan; Qu Chuxiao
- Country of origin: China
- Original language: Mandarin
- No. of episodes: 46

Production
- Executive producers: Fang Fang; Bai Yicong
- Producers: Jia Shikai; Fang Fang; Huang Xing; Li Guangling
- Production companies: Tencent Penguin Pictures; Yuekai Entertainment; New Classics Media

Original release
- Network: Tencent Video
- Release: 30 November 2017

Rule the World (Chinese: 独步天下) is a 2017 Chinese television series based on the novel Du Bu Tian Xia by Li Xin. It stars Raymond Lam and Tang Yixin alongside Zhang Rui, Jing Gangshan, Li Zhinan and Qu Chuxiao. The series started airing on Tencent Video from 30 November 2017 at 20:00 (CST).

== Synopsis ==
Bu Youran, a novelist, finds herself drawn to the story of Dongge who is known as the most beautiful woman among the Jurchen people. Dongge has been hailed as someone who can make or break a nation and becomes the centre of power struggles of many men. For political reasons, her brother presents her to Nurhaci as a gift. She also has to face Cuyen's advances, Daišan's gentler tendencies, Dorgon's unruliness and Hong Taiji's incomparable love. Dongge eventually develops a relationship with Hong Taiji, despite being ten years older than him.

== Cast ==
=== Main ===
- Raymond Lam as Aisin Gioro Hong Taiji

Nurhaci's eighth son. He is domineering but considerate, but is devoted in love. Besotted with Dongge, he eventually gains her affection.

- Tang Yixin as Bu You Ran / Yehe Nara Buxiyamala (Dongge) / Borjigit Bu You Ran

Princess of the Yehe Nara clan and the world's most beautiful woman. She is unafraid of going after her heart and is devoted in love.

- Zhang Rui as Aisin Gioro Daišan

Nurhaci's second son. He is known for his accomplishments on the battlefield. He is gentle, peace-loving and has high endurance. He loves Dongge but his feelings were never reciprocated.

=== Supporting ===
==== Jin Imperial Clan ====
- Jing Gangshan as Aisin Gioro Nurhaci

A prominent chieftain of the Aisin Gioro clan. He is ambitious, courageous and calm. Despite his power and authority, he failed to win Dongge's heart, for he values his empire over love.

- Xu Rongzhen as Fuca Gundei

Second primary consort of Nurhaci, birth mother of Manggultai.

- Lu Meifang as Hamin
- Li Ang as Aisin Gioro Surhaci

Nurhaci's brother.

- Wang Kaiyi as Aisin Gioro Cuyen

Nurhaci's eldest son. He is cold, overbearing and unrestrained. He is deeply in love with Dongge.

- Zhou Xiaoqin as Jiyue

Daisan's wife.

- Li Donghe as Aisin Gioro Manggūltai

Nurhaci's fifth son.

- Qu Chuxiao as Aisin Gioro Dorgon

Nurhaci's fourteenth son. Having handled both civil and strategic affairs, he possesses both wits and braveness and is known for his brilliant military strategies.

- Huang Deyi as Aisin Gioro Dodo

Nurhaci's fifteenth son. He specializes in military affairs.

- Liu Haikuan as Aisin Gioro Jirgalang

Nurhaci's nephew. He was adopted by Nurhaci since young, and groomed to become a powerful chieftain.

- Liu Liansu as Aisin Gioro Yoto

Daisan's eldest son.

- Mao Hangqi as Aisin Gioro Sahaliyan

Daisan's third son.

- Du Yilong as Aisin Gioro Hooge

Hong Taiji's eldest son.

==== Ula Nara Clan ====
- Yan Zidong as Ula Nara Bujantai

Chieftain of the Ula Nara clan. He has a marriage contract with Dongge.

- Huang Sihan as Ula Nara Gedai

Abahai's aunt. Secondary consort of Hong Taiji, birth mother of Hooge. She was Dongge's personal maid and the two value each other like sisters.

- Chen Xinyu as Ula Nara Abahai

Niece of Bujantai. Fourth primary consort of Nurhaci, birth mother of Dorgon and Dodo.

==== Yehe Nara Clan ====
- Shu Yaxin as Yehe Nara Buyanggu

Chieftain of Yeha Nara clan. Dongge's older brother.

- Li Linfei as Yehe Nara Sutai

Wudana's older sister. She married Jirgalang after her sister's death. She is friendly and easygoing.

- Chen Jinyao as Yehe Nara Wudana

Granddaughter of Gintaisi, chieftain of the Yehe Nara clan. Wife of Jirgalang. She is gentle, kind and persistent in love.

==== Borjigit Clan ====
- Wang Yuanhui as Borjigit Jerjer

Daughter of Manggusi, chieftain of the Borjigit clan. She later becomes empress to Hong Taiji's regime.

- Cao Mengge as Borjigit Bumbutai

==== Warka Clan ====
- Li Zhinan as Wukeya
- Xia Nan as Adanzhu

Wukeya's younger sister.

=== Others ===
- Tang Peiyan as Akdun

Nurhaci's personal guard.

- Xie Yuchen as Xiaoqiu
- Qin Junze as Li Gen
- Jin Mi as A'naba
- Sui Xinran as Zhaxida

== Production ==
Though the original novel contains elements of time slip, but due to regulations by SAFRT, it was removed and changes were made to the script.

== See also ==
- Scarlet Heart
