= Zhang Jianing =

Chinese actress (born 1989)

- Born: 26 May 1989 (age 37); Liaoyuan, Jilin, China
- Other name: Karlina Zhang
- Education: Central Academy of Drama
- Occupation: Actress
- Years active: 2009–present
- Agent: Mountain Top

Chinese name
- Simplified Chinese: 张佳宁
Transcriptions

Zhang Jianing (Chinese: 张佳宁, born 26 May 1989), also known as Karlina Zhang, is a Chinese actress. She is best known for her roles as Muyun Yanshuang in Tribes and Empires: Storm of Prophecy (2017) and Lin Beixing in Shining for One Thing (2022).

== Career ==
In 2009, Zhang debuted with a supporting role in the television series Auntie Duohe.

In 2010, Zhang became known to the audience after starring in the family drama A Beautiful Daughter-in-Law Era .

In 2011, Zhang starred in the youth inspirational drama Ant Race's Struggle as the female lead.

In 2012, Zhang starred in the family drama Father's Love and won the LeTV Awards for Outstanding Actress. The same year, she starred in the period melodrama Family On The Go directed by Kong Sheng, portraying a village girl. Zhang won the Best New Actress at the Tongniu Awards for her performance, as well as the Most Popular Actress award at the Jiangsu Television Awards.

In 2014, Zhang starred in the youth comedy film The Struggle of 80's as the female lead. The same year, she starred in the medical drama The Young Doctor directed by Zhao Baogang.

In 2017, Zhang starred in the acclaimed period drama Feather Flies To The Sky. The same year, Zhang starred in the xianxia drama Xuan-Yuan Sword: Han Cloud, as well as the fantasy historical drama Tribes and Empires: Storm of Prophecy.

In 2018, Zhang starred in the historical fiction drama Ruyi's Royal Love in the Palace as Noble Consort Ying. The same year, she played the leading role in the historical comedy drama Tang Dynasty Tour. She then co-starred in the historical drama The Story of Minglan.

In 2020, Zhang starred in the police drama Burning, and female-centric modern drama Love Yourself.

== Filmography ==
=== Film ===
Year	English title	Chinese title	Role	Notes
2010		茶香	Cha Xiang	
2014	The Struggle of 80's	80后的独立宣言	Xu Xiaoqiao	
2015	Let Love, Come a Little Closer	让爱，靠近一点		Short film
2020	Love After Love	第一炉香	Sui Sui	
2026	Unexpected Family	过家家	Su Xiaoyue	

=== Television series ===
Year	English title	Chinese title	Role	Notes
2008		咱们的派出所	Xiu Xiu	
2009	Chuan Guang Dong	闯关东	Qiu Tao	
2009	Auntie Duohe	小姨多鹤	Chun Mei	
2010	A Beautiful Daughter-in-Law Era	媳妇的美好时代	Pan Meili	
2011	Fourth Army Female Soldiers	新四军女兵	Tao Qimei	
2011	Fight Till The End	川军团血战到底	Yu Xiu	
2011	The Age of Iron	钢铁年代	Yang Men'er	
2011	Black List	黑色名单	Ding Xiang	
2011	The Love & Family	有爱就有家	Nan Nan	
2011	Ant Race's Struggle	蚁族的奋斗	Song Chuchu	
2012	Master Lin in Seoul	林师傅在首尔	Yu Jianing	
2012	Family on the Go	温州一家人	Mu Hehe	
2012	Father's Love	老爸的爱情	Sheng Xiaoli	
2012		哎呀妈妈	Pei Youyou	
2012	Destination of Love	婚巢	Wu Anqi	
2013	Let's Get Married	咱们结婚吧	Zhang Yan	Cameo
2013		渗透	Bai Jia	
2014	Left Hand Family Right Hand Love	左手亲情右手爱	Lup Jiabao	
2014	Naked Marriage Afterwards	裸婚之后	Miao Qingqing	
2014		谁解女人心	Yuan Yuan	
2014	Angel's Smile	天使的微笑	Han Meng	
2014	The Young Doctor	青年医生	Ai Xiaotian	
2015		邻居也疯狂	Liu Jixiang	
2015	Kung Fu Mother-in-Law	功夫婆媳	Ren Xiaoxuan	
2015		亲情暖我心	Zhao Xiaoyu	
2015	Hummingbird Attack	蜂鸟	Li Yameng	
2017	Feather Flies To The Sky	鸡毛飞上天	Qiu Yan	
2017	Police Story	江城警事	Zhang Yan	
2017	Tiger Father Dog Son	我的老爸是奇葩	Jia Hui	
2017		黄大年	Tong Tong	
2017	Xuan-Yuan Sword: Han Cloud	轩辕剑之汉之云	Heng Ai	
2017	Tribes and Empires: Storm of Prophecy	九州·海上牧云记	Muyun Yanshuang	
2018	Ruyi's Royal Love in the Palace	如懿传	Barin Meiruo	
2018	Tang Dynasty Tour	唐砖	Li Anlan	
2018	The Story of Minglan	知否知否应是绿肥红瘦	Sheng Rulan	
2019	From Survivor to Healer	爱上你治愈我	Aimi's mother	Cameo
2020	Court Battle	决胜法庭	Fu Xiaorou	
2020	Burning	燃烧	Xu Jiatong	
2020	Love in Shanghai	他其实没有那么爱你	Ding Ding	
2020	The Penalty Zone	黑白禁区	Su Ling	Cameo
2021	The Bond	乔家 的 儿女	Chang Xingyu	
2022	Shining for One Thing	一闪一闪亮星星	Lin Beixing	
2022	Brilliant Class 8	原来是老师啊	Su Qi	
2022	My Superhero	欢迎光临	Jiu Jin	
2022	Ode to Joy 3	欢乐颂3	Zhu Zhe	
2023	Ode to Joy 4	欢乐颂4	Zhu Zhe	
2024	Like a Flowing River 3	大江大河之岁月如歌	Ren Xiaer	
2024	Small Town Stories	小城故事多	Mu Di	
2024	Ode to Joy 5	欢乐颂5	Zhu Zhe	
2024	Reblooming Blue	另一种蓝	Pang Juan	
2024	You Are My Secret	私藏浪漫	Tu Xiaoning	
TBA	Zhaoge	朝歌	Qi Meng	

== Discography ==
Year	English title	Chinese title	Album	Notes
2020	"I Want Your Love"	我要你的爱	Love Yourself OST	

== Awards and nominations ==
Year	Event	Category	Nominated work	Result	Ref.
2019	iFeng Fashion Choice Awards	Fashion Figure of the Year	—N/a	Won	
