= New York New York (2016 film) =

- Poster
- Chinese: 纽约纽约
- Directed by: Luo Dong
- Screenplay by: Ha Zhichao and Lu Nei
- Story by: Jimmy Ngai and Lu Nei
- Produced by: Katherine F. Zhang
- Starring: Ethan Juan; Du Juan; Michael Miu
- Edited by: Chan Chi Wai (H.K.S.E)
- Music by: Yu Yat Yiu and Edgar Hung
- Production companies: Huayi Brothers Media Group; Huayi Brother International; Dongyangxiangshang Films; Beijing Yixiang Tiankai Media; China Film Co-Production Corporation
- Distributed by: Huayi Brothers Media Group; China Film Group Corporation (China)
- Release date: 15 April 2016 (China)
- Running time: 105 minutes
- Countries: China; Hong Kong
- Language: Mandarin
- Box office: CN¥7.9 million

New York New York (Chinese: 纽约纽约) is a 2016 romantic drama film directed by Luo Dong. A Chinese-Hong Kong co-production, it was released in China by Huayi Brothers and China Film Group on 15 April 2016.

== Plot ==
The ill-fated lovers are Lu Tu (Ethan Juan), the bell captain at a grand hotel, and Juan (Du Juan), whose beauty regularly opens doors — most often to the bedrooms of wealthy older men. When a Shanghai-born Chinese American nicknamed Mr. Money arrives to recruit workers for a new hotel in Manhattan, Juan is ready to go. But Lu Tu, who hates his father for abandoning the family, doesn't want to be the kind of guy who runs away. He must choose between home and love, ultimately making a catastrophic decision.

== Cast ==
- Ethan Juan
- Du Juan
- Michael Miu
- Cecilia Yip
- Peter Greene
- Yuan Wenkang
- Huang Ling
- Shi An
- Shao Wen
- Yang Xuwen
- Ma Ge
- MC Jin

== Reception ==
The film has grossed CN¥7.9 million in China.
