= Keep Calm and Be a Superstar =

2018 Chinese-Hong Kong film by Vincent Kok

- Film poster
- Traditional Chinese: 臥底巨星
- Simplified Chinese: 卧底巨星
- Hanyu Pinyin: Wòdǐ Jùxīng
- Directed by: Vincent Kok
- Written by: Vincent Kok; Anselm Chan; Steven Fung
- Produced by: Paco Wong; Kevin Tse
- Starring: Eason Chan; Li Ronghao; Li Yitong; Danny Chan; Cui Zhijia
- Cinematography: Cheng Siu-Keung
- Edited by: Kwong Chi-leung; Chow Kai-pong
- Music by: Ryan Thomas; Raymond Wong; Wendy Zheng
- Production companies: Erdong Pictures; Sun Entertainment Culture Ltd. Feifan Entertainment Production
- Distributed by: Feifan Entertainment
- Release date: 12 January 2018 (China)
- Running time: 98 minutes
- Countries: China; Hong Kong
- Languages: Mandarin; Cantonese
- Box office: $6.1 million

Keep Calm and Be a Superstar (Chinese: 卧底巨星) is a 2018 action comedy film co-written and directed by Vincent Kok and starring Eason Chan, Li Ronghao and Li Yitong. The film is a Chinese-Hong Kong co-production, and premiered in China on January 12, 2018.

== Cast ==
- Eason Chan as Yuan Bao
- Li Ronghao as Tie Zhu
- Li Yitong as Tong Tong
- Danny Chan Kwok-kwan as Brother Tai
- Cui Zhiwei
- Hui Shiu-hung as Wang Qifa
- Wilfred Lau
- K. C. Collins
- Zheng Yifeng
- Edward Ma

== Production ==
Production started in June 2017 and ended in October 2017.

== Release ==
The film was released on January 12, 2018 in China. Douban gave the film 3.6 out of 10. The film received mainly negative reviews.
