= Qu Chuxiao =

Chinese actor (born 1994)

- Born: 28 December 1994 (age 31); Meishan, Sichuan, China
- Education: Central Academy of Drama
- Occupation: Actor
- Years active: 2016–present
- Agent: 2016–2020 FWS (北京喜天影视文化有限公司)

Chinese name
- Traditional Chinese: 屈楚蕭
- Simplified Chinese: 屈楚萧
- Hanyu Pinyin: Qū Chǔxiāo

Qu Chuxiao (屈楚萧；born 28 December 1994) is a Chinese actor and singer. He is best known for the sci-fi film The Wandering Earth, and the television series Bloody Romance and Shining for One Thing.

== Career ==
Qu made his acting debut in 2016 with a leading role in the romance web series My Fair Lady. He then starred in the historical dramas Ruyi's Royal Love in the Palace, playing Yongqi, and Rule the World, playing Dorgon. In 2018, Qu gained popularity for his starring role as a shadow assassin in the wuxia web series Bloody Romance.

Qu debuted on the big screen with a minor role in the comedy film Father and Son in 2017. He then starred in the films Twenty, Graduating, and Oh Boy!. In 2019, Qu starred in China's first interstellar science fiction film The Wandering Earth, playing the lead role. The film was a major success and became the fifth highest-grossing film of all time in China. Forbes China listed Qu under their 30 Under 30 Asia 2019 list.

Qu then starred in the 2021 films Love Will Tear Us Apart and The Yinyang Master. In 2022, he starred in the coming-of-age television series Shining for One Thing.

== Controversy ==
=== Homophobia and misogyny ===
In 2019, after the release of The Wandering Earth, Qu's previous social media activities came under scrutiny. These included his involvement in online groups related to PUA and stalking, as well as his anti-gay and anti-feminist statements.

=== Recasting dispute ===
In July 2018, Qu established his own studio, leading to a tense relationship with his agency, Top High Pictures. By late March 2020, despite Qu having already started martial arts training for the role, he was replaced as the male lead in the costume drama The Long Ballad, with Leo Wu stepping in as a substitute. On March 27, Qu posted an Instagram story expressing gratitude to the director and crew for their support while jeering at Top High's alleged attempts to blacklist him by forcing his replacement due to contractual disputes.

=== Ex-girlfriends' allegations ===
In April 2020, Qu and actress Wan Zilin were photographed on a date in Beijing. However, Qu subsequently denied the relationship on Weibo. A few minutes later, Wan posted on Weibo, "I was just told that I had a breakup. Thank you for your concern."

Four days later, Li Fan (Helen), who identified as Qu's ex-girlfriend, published payment records of Qu's hush-money and photographs of her whip marks and bruises, claiming that she had been abused by Qu in their relationship. In December 2020, another woman, He Zhixin, made similar allegations, asserting that she had been assaulted by one of Qu's friends and had suffered a miscarriage as a result. Her posts were widely misunderstood as alleging that Qu himself was the assailant. She later released an audio recording in which she was threatened by Qu's agent, but also acknowledged that she had never been pregnant. Both Li and He stated that they experienced depression and suicidal thoughts due to Qu. Qu denied all allegations, while his agent asserted that He's audio recording had been "maliciously edited."

On 23 August 2021, Qu's lawsuit against He for defamation opened online. The woman admitted that she had not been pregnant at the time of her posts and that Qu had not assaulted her. The Chengdu Railway Transportation First Court ruled that He's statements lacked factual basis and infringed upon Qu's right to reputation, ordering her to issue a public apology and pay RMB 30,000 in damages and legal costs. On 24 October 2022, the Chengdu Railway Transportation Intermediate Court dismissed He's appeal and upheld the ruling. Qu did not publicize the favorable judgment until January 2026, when influencer Si Xiaodi (Rosie) accused him on social media of assaulting an acquaintance. Qu's studio denied the allegation by releasing the 2022 appellate court judgment, reiterating that He's abuse allegations had been judicially determined to be unfounded.

=== Box office fraud allegation ===
Qu's vehicle Shining for One Thing (2023), the film adaptation of his breakout TV drama of the same name, grossed over 70 million yuan in pre-sale box office on December 5, 2023, making it China's highest first-day pre-sale box office earner. By December 15, half a month before its official release, the total pre-sale box office had surpassed 250 million yuan. However, by December 16, over one million people had received refunds on Maoyan and Tao Piao Piao, two of China's largest ticketing platforms, with an average refund rate of 18.1% across both platforms. During the New Year's holiday period, Shining for One Thing achieved a first-day box office of 400 million yuan and 326 million yuan on the second day. On the third day, the box office dropped to 57 million yuan, a steep decline of nearly 83%. Both the abnormally high refund rate for pre-sale tickets and the steep box office decline after release led to allegations of box office inflation and fraud.

== Filmography ==
=== Film ===
Year	English title	Chinese title	Role	Notes
2017	Father and Son	父子雄兵	Michael	Cameo
2018	Twenty	二十岁	Liu Da	
2019	The Wandering Earth	流浪地球	Liu Qi	
2021	The Yinyang Master	侍神令	Yuan Baiya	
2021	Love Will Tear Us Apart	我要我们在一起	Lv Qinyang	
2023	The Breaking Ice	燃冬	Han Xiao	
2023	Shining for One Thing	一闪一闪亮星星	Zhang Wansen	
2024	Crisis Route	危机航线	Mike	
2025	Wild Nights, Tamed Beasts	长夜将尽	Zhou Ping	
2025	Gift from a Cloud	有朵云像你	Qin Tian	
2026	Enjoy Your Journey	藏地情书	Mao Mingji	
2027	The Wandering Earth 3	流浪地球3	Liu Qi	
TBA	Graduation in Progress	毕业进行时	Xiao Jin	
TBA	Zhen Zhu Zhen Zhu	珍珠珍珠	Dou Sheng	
TBA	Wu Ming Zhi Bei: Yi Yi Fei Fan	无名之辈：意义非凡	Chen Xiaolong	

=== Television series ===
Year	English title	Chinese title	Role	Ref.
2016	My Fair Lady	我的朋友陈白露小姐	Chen Yan	
2017	Rule the World	独步天下	Dorgon	
2018	Bloody Romance	媚者无疆	Chang An / Xie Huan	
2018	Ruyi's Royal Love in the Palace	如懿传	Yongqi	
2020	Mystery of Antiques III	古董局中局3：掠宝清单	Xu Yicheng	
2022	Shining for One Thing	一闪一闪亮星星	Zhang Wansen	
2026	To the Stars	星月征途	Wu Wei	
TBA	Yesterday Once More	同心结	Qin Fei	
TBA	Faith & Law	信条	Yang Sen	
TBA	Back to Life	冬风吹又生	Sun Xi	

== Discography ==
=== Soundtrack appearances ===
Year	English title	Chinese title	Album	Notes
2016	"Lacking Abit"	只差一点点	My Fair Lady OST	
2018	"Waiting For You (Male Version)"	一生等你	Bloody Romance OST	
2022	"For Lovers"		Shining for One Thing OST	

== Awards and nominations ==
Year	Award	Category	Nominated work	Results	Ref.
2017	Men's UNO YOUNG Awards	Future New Talent Award	—N/a	Won	
2019	GQ 2019 Men of the Year	New Actor of the Year	The Wandering Earth	Won	
2019	6th The Actors of China Award Ceremony	Best Actor (Web series)	Bloody Romance	Nominated	

== See also ==
- Qu (surname 屈)
