= Shining for One Thing =

2022 Chinese television series

- Promotional poster
- Traditional Chinese: 一閃一閃亮星星
- Simplified Chinese: 一闪一闪亮星星
- Hanyu Pinyin: Yī shǎn yī shǎn liàng xīngxīng
- Genre: Time travel; Mystery; Romance
- Written by: Wang Chen; Duan Yu Le
- Directed by: Chen Xiaoming; Zhang Pan
- Starring: Qu Chuxiao; Zhang Jianing
- Opening theme: "Shining For One Thing" by Zhao Bei Er
- Ending theme: "Run to You" by Zhao Bei Er
- Country of origin: China
- Original language: Mandarin
- No. of episodes: 24

Production
- Running time: 40 minutes
- Production companies: Beijing Free Cool Whale Pictures Co., Ltd.

Original release
- Network: iQIYI
- Release: January 26, 2022

Shining for One Thing (Chinese: 一闪一闪亮星星; pinyin: Yī shǎn yī shǎn liàng xīngxīng), is a 2022 Chinese time travel, mystery, romance television series. It stars Qu Chuxiao and Zhang Jianing. The series was released on January 26, 2022, on IQIYI.

== Synopsis ==
Lin Beixing, an "experienced woman" who is about to enter her thirties, missed out on achieving her dream of love as her boyfriend, Zhan Yu, broke up with her, and her life and work have become a mess. However, unsure if this is God playing tricks on her, Lin Beixing suddenly finds herself back at the age of eighteen. The third year of high school is a nightmare, but Lin Beixing decides to retake the college entrance examination and start anew for herself, without Zhan Yu. However, Lin Beixing's sweet dream is shattered by a boy named Zhang Wansen. The accidental encounter with Zhang Wansen after the college entrance examination becomes the catalyst to end Lin Beixing's time and space journey. Lin Beixing begins to investigate the cause of Zhang Wansen's death and embarks on a difficult journey to save him. The days in high school are filled with romance but fleeting, and Lin Beixing's changes allows her to reap the beautiful moments that she had once overlooked. With the arrival of summer, Lin Beixing realizes that she not only saved Zhang Wansen, but also saved the boy's love for her since their youth, a love that is deeper than the sea.

== Cast and characters ==
Main cast

- Qu Chuxiao as Zhang Wansen
- Zhang Jianing as Lin Beixing

Supporting cast

- Caesar Wu as Zhan Yu
- Fu Jing as Gao Ge
- Luo Mingjie as Yang Chao Yang
- Jiang Yun Lin as Mai Zi
- Xu Ziyin as Han Teng Teng
- Cui Yi as Lin Beixing's mom
- Yan Chang as Lei Ge
- Sun Tian Yu as Liu Ga
- Hou Wei Tao as Lin Dahai

== Production ==
The series began filming in December 2020 in Xiamen, China, and wrapped up in February 2021.

On January 12, 2022, the drama officially announced the "Nanchuan Sky" version of the character poster and pilot trailer. On January 17, the drama was officially announced and released character trailers.

=== Film adaptation ===
A movie adaptation of the same name was announced on July 10, 2023, with the original cast reprising their roles. On August 22, 2023, the "Reunion" version trailer was released.
