= Unexpected Family =

2026 film directed by Li Taiyan

- Theatrical release poster
- Simplified Chinese: 过家家
- Hanyu Pinyin: Guò jiā jiā
- Directed by: Li Taiyan
- Written by: Li Taiyan
- Produced by: Han Sanping
- Starring: Jackie Chan; Peng Yuchang; Zhang Jianing; Pan Binlong; Li Ping
- Cinematography: Fan Chao
- Edited by: Xiao Yang
- Production companies: CQR Film and Television (Wuhan); China Film Group; Xiao Xiang Pictures
- Distributed by: China Film Group
- Release date: January 1, 2026
- Running time: 121 minutes
- Country: China
- Languages: Mandarin; Wuhan dialect
- Box office: $7.7 million

Unexpected Family (Chinese: 过家家) is a 2026 Chinese comedy-drama film written and directed by Li Taiyan, produced by Han Sanping, and starring Jackie Chan, Peng Yuchang, Zhang Jianing, Pan Binlong, and Li Ping. It tells the story of an elderly person with dementia who forms a temporary family with tenants and neighbors. The film was released in China on January 1, 2026.

== Synopsis ==
Ren Jiqing, a retired weightlifting coach who lives alone, has developed Alzheimer's disease and mistakenly believes that his young tenant, Zhong Bufan, is the son who left home many years ago. Following a doctor's advice, Zhong Bufan, together with Su Xiaoyue, who pretends to be Ren Jiqing's daughter-in-law, "Master" Jia, and their neighbor Jin Zhen, creates a temporary family for Ren Jiqing as his condition gradually worsens.

Although each member of this odd "family" carries painful memories and emotional scars of their own, what begins as an act slowly becomes genuine. As they spend time together, they gradually come to terms with their pasts and discover what the true meaning of family really is.

== Cast ==
- Jackie Chan as Ren Jiqing
- Peng Yuchang as Zhong Bufan
- Zhang Jianing as Su Xiaoyue
- Pan Binlong as Jia Ye
- Li Ping as Jin Zhengu

== Production ==
The film was officially registered for production on July 16, 2019. It was originally scheduled to be filmed in Beijing, but production was postponed due to the COVID-19 pandemic. In early 2024, the film resumed development, with the filming location changed to Wuhan, and principal photography began in March 2024. Filming wrapped in Wuhan on May 14, 2024.

The film is one of the few in Jackie Chan's acting career to feature no martial arts action sequences. Chan said he hoped the film would raise public awareness of people living with Alzheimer's disease and encourage society to offer them the care, companionship, and support they deserve.

== Release ==
On October 31, 2025, the film was officially retitled from Whispers of Gratitude to Unexpected Family. The following day, it was announced that the film would be released in China on January 1, 2026.

Unexpected Family was released theatrically in China on January 1, 2026.
