= Xu Qing =

Chinese actress

- 许晴
- Born: January 22, 1969 (age 57); Beijing, China
- Other name: Summer Xu
- Education: Beijing Film Academy
- Occupation: Actress
- Years active: 1990–present
- Agents: Galloping Horse (2005–2006); Huayi Brothers (2009–2010)

Xu Qing (Chinese: 许晴; born January 22, 1969), also known as Summer Xu, is a Chinese actress.

== Early life ==
Xu was born at the 301 Hospital in Beijing. Her mother, of Tujia ethnicity, was the dance leader in the Central Military Commission Political Work Department Song and Dance Troupe, while her father, of Han ethnicity, was originally a guard for He Long. Due to his handsome appearance, he joined the art troupe on He's suggestion. Xu has an older sister, Xu Ye, who participated in the television series Journey to the West (1986), enlisted in the army at the age of 15, and earned a bachelor's and a master's degree in dance in Japan, where she lived for over a decade with her Chinese husband and children. Xu Qing's grandmother and several uncles and aunts were diplomats. Her maternal great-grandfather, Xiong Wenqing, sold his family property to support the Xinhai Revolution and was a close friend of Huang Xing, serving as a key figure in the Tongmenghui and as the last Speaker of the Hubei Provincial Assembly.

Due to her parents' reluctance to keep her in contact with the performing arts, Xu lived with her grandmother at the China Foreign Affairs University from nine days old until her third year of high school. She attended the High School Affiliated to Renmin University of China, where she excelled academically. In her third year of high school, she returned to her parents' Song and Dance Troupe compound because her grandmother had to take care of the ailing great-grandmother. Xu's striking appearance led many uncles and aunts there to suggest she apply to the Beijing Film Academy. She successfully auditioned with a tap dance taught by her mother. In 1988, Xu received two university admission letters: one from the German Department of the University of International Relations, the other from the Performance Department of the Beijing Film Academy. She chose the latter and set a school record with a perfect score of 120 in gaokao's mathematics section.

== Career ==
In 1980, at the age of 11, Xu made her acting debut in the Sino-Vietnamese War film Iron Armor 008. At 14, she appeared in the television series Journey to the West. While in her second year at the Beijing Film Academy, Xu was discovered by director Chen Kaige and starred in the film Life on a String. She later starred in Ling Zifeng's film Ripples Across Stagnant Water.

After graduating in 1992, Xu joined the Beijing Film Studio. The same year, she was sent to Singapore by China's Ministry of Radio, Film, and Television to work with the Singapore Broadcasting Corporation, where she became a contracted artist. During her year and a half in Singapore, she starred in several local television dramas, such as The Witty Advisor and The Fiery Lover. Meanwhile, Xu won the 4th Chinese Film Performing Arts Society Award, her first award, for Ripples Across Stagnant Water, but when she flew from Singapore back to China for the award, she felt the vanity and insincerity of the industry and decided not to attend award ceremonies in the future. Xu fulfilled her contract with the Singapore Broadcasting Corporation and returned to China in April, 1994.

In the 1990s, Xu gained popularity through a series of romantic dramas in China. Her collaborations with Wang Zhiwen in At the Foot of the Imperial City and Rain and Shine made them a classic on-screen couple. In 1998, her role in Coming and Going, opposite Pu Cunxin, cemented her screen image as a sex symbol. After producing a series of successful films and TV shows, including My 1919, Laughing in the Wind, and Heroic Legend of the Qing Dynasty, Xu went to UCLA in 2007 to study film production. She returned to China for the filming of The Founding of a Republic, in which she plays Soong Ching-ling, earning the Hundred Flowers Award for Best Supporting Actress. After returning to China, she produced her first TV series Huangliang Hutong No. 19 and starred in her first Hollywood film, Looper.

From 2013, Xu participated in the Asian tour of Stan Lai's stage play "A Dream Like a Dream" for over ten years, winning the Huading Award for Best Actress in a Stage Play. In 2014 and 2015, she joined the first and second seasons of the Hunan TV travel reality show Divas Hit the Road, which sparked Internet controversy and memes. She later starred in Mr. Six, for which she won the Hundred Flowers Award for Best Actress, as well as Hidden Man and the international production 24 Hours to Live. In 2016, Xu also announced her directorial debut with the film Romance in Red as well as her first time working as a film producer in Luzhuanhei Zhuanfen. However, Romance in Red was never filmed, and Luzhuanhei Zhuanfen, supervised by Kang Je-gyu and starring T.O.P. and Xu, was halted after initial shooting due to the K-content ban in China in 2017 after South Korea's deployment of THAAD system.

Since 2019, Xu has had no film or television works released. One of her projects shot before 2019 was released with her face altered by AI for unknown reasons, leading to speculation of a "soft" ban in China. Starting in September 2023, Xu resumed touring with the stage play "A Dream Like a Dream." In November 2023, her office, Dongyang Cangguo Film and Television Studio, was ordered to pay 6.24 million RMB due to a contract dispute, which was believed to stem from her industry blacklisting.

== Personal life ==
Xu Qing's first boyfriend during her senior year of high school was Wu Ruofu, who was then with the Central Military Commission Political Work Department Song and Dance Troupe. They began dating after Xu was accepted by both the German Department of the University of International Relations and the Performance Department of the Beijing Film Academy. She chose the latter because of him: "I just wanted to be closer to his circle. If I studied German, our professional paths would never cross." The relationship lasted for three years.

In 1990, while filming Life on a String, Xu was rumored to be involved with director Chen Kaige, which precipitated Chen's divorce from Hung Huang. In 1991, Xu starred in Ripples Across Stagnant Water with You Yong, who ended his relationship with Xiao Xue and began dating Xu. Later, while filming At the Foot of the Imperial City with You Yong and Wang Zhiwen, Xu broke up with You and started a two-year relationship with Wang. On The Jin Xing Show, Xu explained that the breakup with Wang was due to her inability to separate work from their personal lives, although they remained friends thereafter. She mentioned that she decided not to date actors anymore, and her subsequent partners were mostly unknown to the public.

In 1995, after filming The Emperor's Shadow, Xu moved to Singapore and took a three-year hiatus from acting, returning in 1998 with the publication of a photo collection. That same year, a Chinese newspaper reported that a wealthy Singaporean businessman had "kept" a female star, forbidding her from acting or dating for three years, and Xu was suspected to be the subject due to her prolonged stay in Singapore.

In 1997, Xu met Liu Bo, a businessman in the culture industry who invested 1 million RMB in Xu's photo collection and invited Yu Qiuyu to write the preface. The following year, Liu began dating Xu before divorcing his wife. Liu, born in Zhuzhou, Hunan, had a public resume claiming he entered Wuhan University's Chinese Department at 14, earned a master's degree from Hunan University of Traditional Chinese Medicine, and a PhD in philosophy under Ji Xianlin at Peking University. However, a 2017 investigation by Tencent News revealed Liu graduated with a technical secondary school diploma from Hunan University of Traditional Chinese Medicine and briefly studied at a writers' class at Wuhan University funded by a Zhuzhou newspaper where he worked then. He obtained his PhD from Peking University's Department of Oriental Studies, reportedly through his personal connection with Ji Xianlin while his 2000 dissertation lacking academic standards. Xu and Liu broke up in 2002 because, according to Xu, "he became arrogant after becoming a businessman, which I didn't like." She decided to leave after overhearing Liu falsely claim familiarity with Chow Yun-fat and his wife during a business call. In 2003, Liu fled the country due to debts; in 2014, Interpol issued a red notice for him on fraud charges. In 2017, Liu died of a heart attack in Japan.

In 2004, Xu was reported to be dating a Guangdong businessman surnamed Su. Their on-and-off relationship lasted until around 2010. During this period, Xu was rumored to be involved with a married poet, leading her to turn to Buddhism due to her troubled love life.

In 2006, a magazine published an article revealing the extramarital affair between the disgraced China Construction Bank president Wang Xuebing and an actress (alias Song Jingjing). Southern Metropolis Weekly reported that the unnamed actress was Xu Qing, adding that Xu's father had remarried a woman younger than Xu. Xu sued the weekly's owner The Nanfang Daily, which later issued an apology, acknowledging the lack of sufficient evidence for their report. In August 2009, on the talkshow A Date with Luyu, Xu denied her relationship with Wang again during her promotion of The Founding of a Republic, where she plays Song Ching-ling: "Would a country let a banker's mistress play the role of the nation's mother?" In a 2014 interview with a magazine, Xu mentioned that Wang called her after his release from prison, commending her for handling the rumors with dignity. In 2017, the Central Party School Press published a collection of interviews with corrupt officials, where Wang Xuebing's description of his actress lover (alias Anna) is widely believed to be Xu.

== Filmography ==
=== Film ===
Year	English title	Chinese title	Role	Notes/Ref.
1990	Life on a String	边走边唱	Lan Xiu'er	
1992	Ripples Across Stagnant Water	狂	Cai Dasao	
1994	Dark Obsession	疯蝶	Ai Mei	
1996	The Emperor's Shadow	秦颂	Princess Yueyang	
1999	Agreed Not to Separate	说好不分手	Lin Qiao	
1999	My 1919	我的1919	Mei	
2007	Flash Point	导火线	Madam Lau	Cameo
2009	The Founding of a Republic	建国大业	Soong Ching-ling	
2012	To My Wife	与妻书	Chen Yiyang / Xia Shan	
2012	Looper	环形使者	Old Joe's wife	Credited as "Summer Qing"
2015	I Love You, Too.	恋爱排班表	Xiao Qi	
2015	Mr. Six	老炮儿	Hua Xiazi	
2016	League of Gods	封神传奇	Taiyi Zhenren	
2017	24 Hours to Live	24小时：末路重生	Lin	
2017	The Hidden Sword	刀背藏身	Zhihui	
2018	Hidden Man	邪不压正	Tang Fengyi	
TBA	Song of the Assassins	刺局	Madame Hua	
TBA	Confidant	士为知己者		
TBA	Silence of Smoke	闻烟		

=== Television series ===
Year	English title	Chinese title	Role	Notes/Ref.
1991	Nanxing Ji	南行记	Yemaozi	
1992	At The Foot of the Imperial City	皇城根儿	Jinzhi	
1993	The Witty Advisor	金牌师爷	Princess Xiaodian	
1994	Fiery Of Lover	烈火情人	He Lin	
1995	Rain and Shine	东边日出西边雨	Xiao Nan	
1998	Coming and Going	来来往往	Lin Zhu	
2000		长缨在手	Gong Yue / Ying'er	
2001	Laughing in the Wind	笑傲江湖	Ren Yingying	
2002	Black Triangle	黑三角	Xia Yingjie	
2002	The Chinese Woman at the Gunpoint of Gestapo	盖世太保枪口下的中国女人	Jin Ling (based on Qian Xiuling)	
2003		DA师	Lin Xiaoyan	
2003	Half of the Moon	半个月亮	Li Dongna	
2006	Close to You and Make Me Warm	靠近你，温暖我	Ding Aiyu	
2006	Heroic Legend of the Qing Dynasty	大清风云	Empress Dowager Xiaozhuang	
2006		沙家浜	Qingsao	
2006	Stone Scissors Cloth	石头、剪刀、布	Aiyu	
2006	Bottom Line of Man	男人底线	Shen Congcong	
2006		红墨坊	Princess Ziyan	
2007		局中局	Jiang Wei	
2008	Forgive	宽恕	Zhuang Min	
2010	Spy Change 1939	谍变1939	Zhao Yina	
2010	Age Mates	同龄人	Tong Nannan	
2011	The Beautiful Blooming Flower	美丽鲜花在开放	Ye Guo	
2012		皇粮胡同十九号	Feng Xueyan / Feng Ziting	
2015	Mother Like Flowers	妈妈像花一样	Zhang Xingfu	
2015	Ferocious	来势凶猛	Ma Xiuqin	
2019	Doctor of Traditional Chinese Medicine	老中医	Bao Xiu	
2019	Novoland: Eagle Flag	九州缥缈录	Bai Lingbo	

== Awards and nominations ==
Year	Award	Category	Nominated work	Result	Ref.
1992	15th Hundred Flowers Awards	Best Actress	Ripples Across Stagnant Water	Nominated	
1993	4th Golden Phoenix Awards	Society Award	Ripples Across Stagnant Water	Won	
2002	20th China TV Golden Eagle Award	Best Actress	The Chinese Woman at the Gunpoint of Gestapo	Won	
2009	1st Macau International Movie Festival	Best Supporting Actress	The Founding of a Republic	Won	
2010	30th Hundred Flowers Awards	Best Supporting Actress	The Founding of a Republic	Won	
2013	10th Huading Awards	Best Actress (Stage)	A Dream Like A Dream	Won	
2015	7th Macau International Movie Festival	Best Actress	Mr. Six	Nominated	
2016	18th Huading Awards	Best Film Actress (Mainland China)	Mr. Six	Won	
2016	7th China Film Director's Guild Awards	Best Actress	Mr. Six	Nominated	
2016	23rd Beijing College Student Film Festival	Best Actress	Mr. Six	Nominated	
2016	16th Chinese Film Media Awards	Best Supporting Actress	Mr. Six	Nominated	
2016	33rd Hundred Flowers Awards	Best Actress	Mr. Six	Won	
2016	12th Chinese American Film Festival	Best Actress	Mr. Six	Won	
2018	55th Golden Horse Film Festival and Awards	Best Supporting Actress	Hidden Man	Nominated	
2019	13th Asian Film Awards	Best Supporting Actress	Hidden Man	Nominated	
2020	7th The Actors of China Awards	Best Actress (Sapphire)	—N/a	Nominated	
