= Yang Xuwen =

Chinese actor (born 1994)

- 杨旭文
- Born: April 2, 1994 (age 32); Nanjing, Jiangsu, China
- Other name: William Yang
- Education: Central Academy of Drama
- Occupation: Actor
- Years active: 2014–present
- Agent: Happy Smile Media Group 喜笑颜开影视
- Notable work: Legend of the Condor Heroes (2018), Strange Tales of Tang Dynasty series
- Height: 1.88 m (6 ft 2 in)

Chinese name
- Traditional Chinese: 楊旭文
- Simplified Chinese: 杨旭文
Transcriptions
Standard Mandarin
- Hanyu Pinyin: Yáng Xùwén

Yang Xuwen (simplified Chinese: 杨旭文; traditional Chinese: 楊旭文; pinyin: Yáng Xùwén, born 2 April 1994) is a Chinese actor. He is best known in for his role as Guo Jing in The Legend of the Condor Heroes (2017).

== Biography ==
=== Early life ===
Yang was born and raised in Nanjing, Jiangsu, on April 2, 1994. He attended Nanjing Foreign Language School and Nanjing No.9 Middle School. He entered Central Academy of Drama in September 2012, majoring in acting.

=== Acting career ===
In early 2014, Yang signed with Huayi Brothers Media Group. In July 2014, Yang made his acting debut in historical drama Cosmetology High, playing a scholar. In August, he co-starred with Dilraba Dilmurat and Merxat in the web drama The Backlight of Love. In October, he played the lead role in the modern drama Horrible Bosses.

Yang's first major film role was in the action comedy film Bad Guys Always Die (2015). In October, he was cast in the youth military drama Deep Blue.

In April 2016, Yang had a minor role in the romantic drama film New York New York. In July, he featured in the fantasy action drama Noble Aspirations.

In January 2017, Yang portrayed Guo Jing in The Legend of the Condor Heroes, adapted from Louis Cha's wuxia novel of the same name.

In 2018, Yang starred in the business drama Excellent Investor and shenmo television series Ghost Catcher Zhong Kui’s Record.

In 2019, Yang starred in the military drama Anti-Terrorism Special Forces III. The same year, he was cast in the romance drama The Memory About You.

In 2022, Yang starred in the historical suspense drama Strange Tales of Tang Dynasty in the lead role of the young general Lu Lingfeng. The drama was well received and described as a "dark horse drama," achieving a relatively good score of 7.9 on Douban, an online Chinese film and drama forum. Yang has since reprised his role in the sequel drama, Strange Tales of Tang Dynasty 2: To the West, which premiered on IQIYI on July 18, 2024.

== Filmography ==
=== Film ===
Year	English title	Chinese title	Role	Notes
2015	Bad Guys Always Die	坏蛋必须死	Pa-pa	
2016	New York New York	纽约，纽约	A Kun	
2021	If At First	如果有当初	Huang Yaozu	

=== Television series ===
Year	English title	Chinese title	Role	Notes
2014	Cosmetology High	美人制造	Liu Gongzi	
2015	The Backlight of Love	逆光之恋	Zhao Qianqiu	Web series
2016	Noble Aspirations	青云志	Qing Long	
2016	Noble Aspirations 2	青云志2	Qing Long	
2017	The Legend of the Condor Heroes	射雕英雄传	Guo Jing	
2018	Excellent Investor	金牌投资人	Fang Yubin	
2018	Ghost Catcher Zhong Kui’s Record	钟馗捉妖记	Zhong Kui	
2019	Anti-Terrorism Special Forces III	反恐特战队之天狼	Qin Xiaoyang	
2019	Horrible Bosses	恶老板	Wang Zijin	
2021	The Memory about You	半暖时光	Shen Hou	
2021	Crossroad Bistro	北辙南辕	Liu Liang Zhou	Support Role
2022	Strange Tales of Tang Dynasty	唐朝诡事录	Lu Lingfeng	
2022	Love in Time	我的秘密室友	He Zhengyu	
2023	Scent of Time	为有暗香来	Xu Ming	Cameo
2024	Eternal Brotherhood Season 1	紫川·光明三杰	Zichuan Xiu	
2024	Strange Tales of Tang Dynasty 2: To the West	唐朝诡事录之西行	Lu Lingfeng	
2024	Duel of Shadows	黑白诀	Han Zhi Fei	
2025
2025	Contenders	狮城山海	Liu Zhendong	
2025	The Great Lin Qian Jin	了不起的林千金	Li Yan	
2025	Eternal Brotherhood Season 2	紫川之光明王	Zichuan Xiu	
TBA	Strange Tales of Tang Dynasty 3: To Chang'an	唐朝诡事录之长安	Lu Lingfeng	
TBA	Black and White Bureau	黑白局	Zhan Peng	
