= Empress Xiaozhuangwen =

Qing Dynasty empress dowager (1613–1688)

- Grand Empress Dowager Zhaosheng
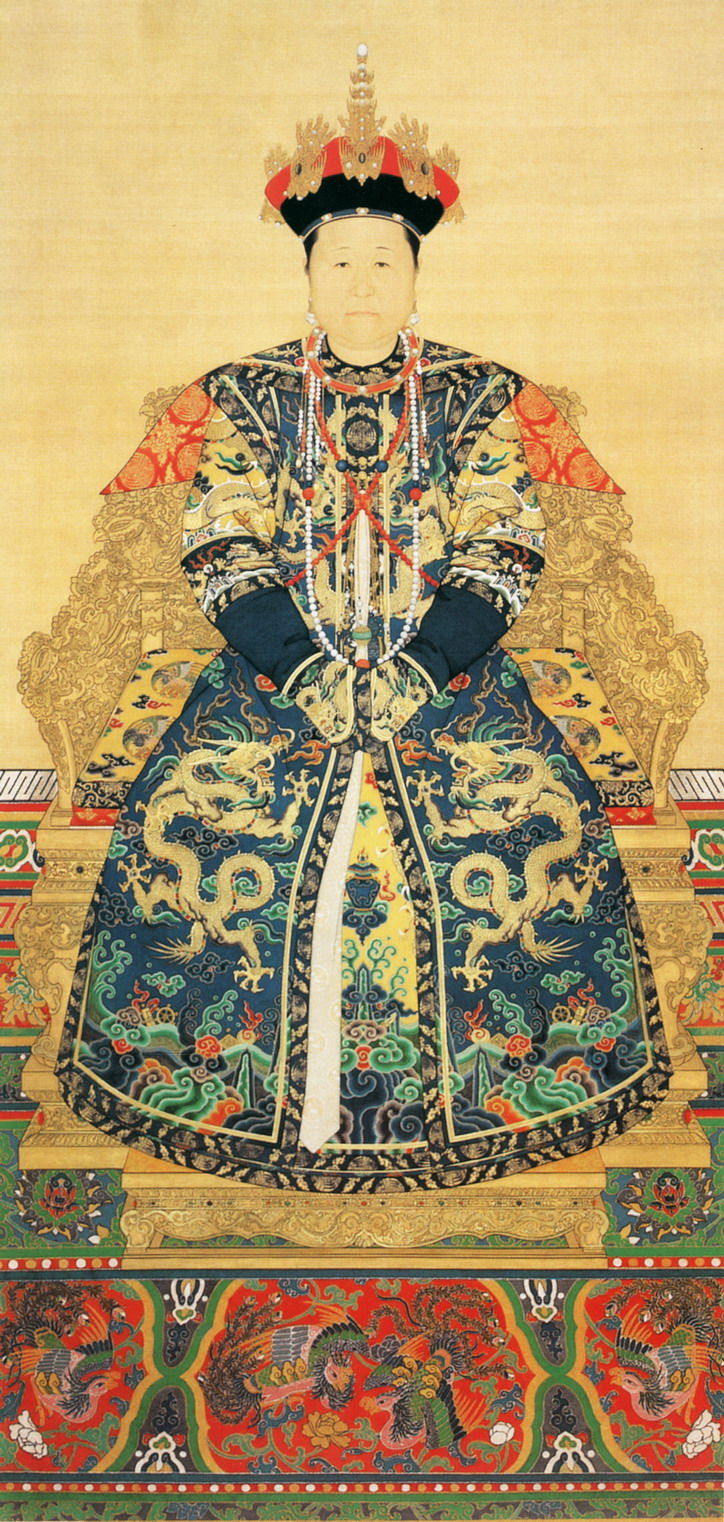
- Qing Dynasty portrait of Empress Xiaozhuangwen

Empress dowager of the Qing dynasty
- Tenure: 21 September 1643 – 5 February 1661
- Successor: Empress Dowager Cihe and Empress Dowager Renxian

Grand empress dowager of the Qing dynasty
- Tenure: 5 February 1661 – 27 January 1688
- Successor: Grand Empress Dowager Cixi
- Born: Borjigit Bumbutai (博爾濟吉特·布木布泰); 28 March 1613 (萬曆四十一年 閏二月 八日)
- Died: 27 January 1688 (aged 74) (康熙二十六年 十二月 二十五日); Cining Palace, Forbidden City
- Burial: Western Zhao Mausoleum, near Eastern Qing Tombs
- Spouse: Hong Taiji (m. 1625; died 1643)
- Issue: Princess Yongmu of the First Rank; Princess Shuhui of the First Rank; Princess Shuzhe of the First Rank; Shunzhi Emperor
Names
- Borjigit Bumbutai (博爾濟吉特·布木布泰)
Posthumous name
- Empress Xiaozhuang Renxuan Chengxian Gongyi Zhide Chunhui Yitian Qisheng Wen (孝莊仁宣誠憲恭懿至德純徽翊天啟聖文皇后)
- House: Borjigit (博爾濟吉特)
- Father: Zhaisang
- Mother: Boli

Empress Xiaozhuangwen
- Traditional Chinese: 孝莊文皇后
- Simplified Chinese: 孝庄文皇后
Transcriptions
Standard Mandarin
- Hanyu Pinyin: Xiàozhuāngwén Huánghòu

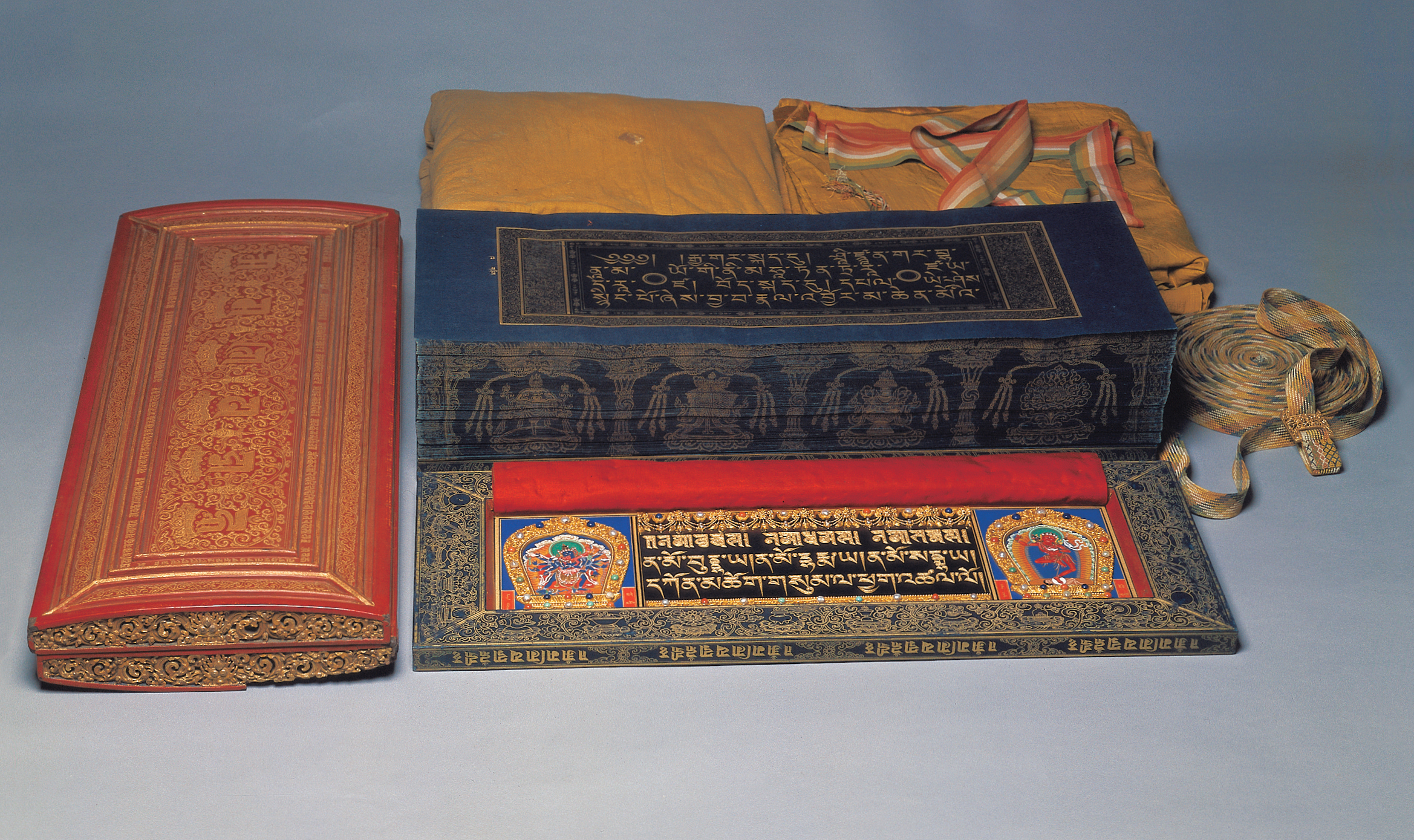
The so-called Kangxi Kangyur, completed in 1669, commissioned by Empress Dowager Xiaozhuang grandmother of the emperor. National Palace Museum

Bumbutai (Mongolian: Бумбутай; Manchu: ᠪᡠᠮᠪᡠᡨᠠᡳ; Chinese: 布木布泰; 28 March 1613 – 27 January 1688), of the Khorchin Mongol Borjigit clan, was the consort of Hong Taiji. She was 21 years his junior. She was honoured as Empress Dowager Zhaosheng during the reign of her son, Fulin, the Shunzhi Emperor, and as Grand Empress Dowager Zhaosheng during the reign of her grandson, Xuanye, the Kangxi Emperor.

As empress dowager and grand empress dowager, she had significant influence in the Qing imperial court and was highly respected for her political wisdom and insight. After her death, she was posthumously honoured with the title Empress Xiaozhuangwen, although she never held the rank of empress consort during her lifetime.

== Life ==
=== Family background ===
- Father: Zhaisang (寨桑), held the title of a first rank prince (親王)
  - Paternal grandfather: Manggusi (莽古思), held the title of a first rank prince (親王)
  - Paternal aunt: Empress Xiaoduanwen (1599–1649)
- Mother: Boli (博禮; d. 1654)
- Four elder brothers
- One elder sister
  - Primary consort Minhui (1609–1641)

=== Wanli era ===
Bumbutai was born on the eighth day of the intercalary second lunar month in the 41st year of the reign of the Wanli Emperor, which translates to 28 March 1613 in the Gregorian calendar.

=== Tianming era ===
In March or April 1625, Bumbutai married Hong Taiji and became one of his multiple wives. Prior to this, the Khorchin Mongols had sent Hong Taiji another woman, Jerjer, the future Empress Xiaoduanwen, on 28 May 1614, to strengthen the relationship between the Qing dynasty and the Khorchin. Bumbutai's elder sister, Harjol, the future primary consort Minhui, would marry Hong Taiji on 6 December 1634.

=== Chongde era ===
Bumbutai gave birth on 31 January 1629 to Hong Taiji's fourth daughter, Princess Yongmu of the First Rank, on 2 March 1632 to his fifth daughter, Princess Shuhui of the First Rank, and on 16 December 1633 to his seventh daughter, Princess Shuzhe of the First Rank.

When Hong Taiji conferred titles on his five primary spouses in August 1636, Bumbutai was named "Consort Zhuang" of Yongfu Palace (永福宮).

On 15 March 1638, Consort Zhuang gave birth to Hong Taiji's ninth son, Fulin.

=== Shunzhi era ===
Hong Taiji died on 21 September 1643 and was succeeded by Fulin, who was enthroned as the Shunzhi Emperor. Bumbutai, as the mother of the reigning emperor, was honoured with the title "Holy Mother, Empress Dowager" with honorary name "Zhaosheng". Her aunt Jerjer, as the empress consort of the previous emperor, was similarly honored as "Mother Empress, Empress Dowager". Hong Taiji's younger half-brother, Dorgon, was appointed as prince regent to rule on behalf of the Shunzhi Emperor until the emperor reached adulthood. After Dorgon died on 31 December 1650, the Shunzhi Emperor posthumously stripped him of his princely title and had his dead body exhumed and mutilated. It is believed – though not supported by historical evidence – that Empress Dowager Zhaosheng secretly married Dorgon after Hong Taiji's death, since levirate marriage was common among Mongols.

=== Kangxi era ===
Empress Dowager Zhaosheng kept a low profile during the reign of her son and had little interference in politics. The Shunzhi Emperor died on 5 February 1661 and was succeeded by his third son Xuanye, who was enthroned as the Kangxi Emperor. As the grandmother of the reigning emperor, she was honored as "Grand Empress Dowager Zhaosheng". Since the emperor was underage at the time, the Four Regents of the Kangxi Emperor, appointed by the Shunzhi Emperor, ruled on his behalf until he reached adulthood. During this time, Grand Empress Dowager Zhaosheng advised her grandson to learn from the regents and took charge of his upbringing after the emperor's mother died.

When the Kangxi Emperor grew up and began his personal rule in 1667, he felt threatened by the strong influence of Oboi, one of the four regents. Two years later, Grand Empress Dowager Zhaosheng assisted her grandson in his plans to get rid of Oboi. Oboi was lured into a trap (forced to sit on a broken chair), placed under arrest, and removed from power. Throughout her life, Bumbutai disliked living in the Forbidden City, despite the luxurious conditions it offered. She also refused to hold any birthday celebrations as she felt that it would be costly.

When Grand Empress Dowager Zhaosheng fell sick in the autumn of 1687, the Kangxi Emperor personally took care of his grandmother. She died on 27 January 1688.

== Titles ==
- During the reign of the Wanli Emperor (r. 1572–1620):
  - Lady Borjigit (from 28 March 1613)
- During the reign of Nurhaci (r. 1616–1626):
  - Secondary consort (側福晉; from March/April 1625)
- During the reign of Hong Taiji (r. 1626–1643):
  - Consort Zhuang (莊妃; from August 1636), fourth rank consort
- During the reign of the Shunzhi Emperor (r. 1643–1661):
  - Empress Dowager Zhaosheng (昭聖皇太后; from 21 September 1643)
- During the reign of the Kangxi Emperor (r. 1661–1722):
  - Grand Empress Dowager Zhaosheng (昭聖太皇太后; from 5 February 1661)
  - Empress Xiaozhuangwen (孝莊文皇后; from October/November 1688)

== Issue ==
- As secondary consort:
  - Princess Yongmu of the First Rank (固倫雍穆公主; 31 January 1629 – February/March 1678), personal name Yatu (雅圖), Hong Taiji's fourth daughter
    - Married Birtakhar (弼爾塔哈爾; d. 1667) of the Khorchin Borjigit clan in 1641
  - Princess Shuhui of the First Rank (固倫淑慧公主; 2 March 1632 – 28 February 1700), personal name Atu (阿圖), Hong Taiji's fifth daughter
    - Married Suo'erha (索爾哈) of the Khalkha Borjigit clan in 1643
    - Married Sabdan (色布騰; d. 1667) of the Barin Borjigit clan in 1648
  - Princess Shuzhe of the First Rank (固倫淑哲公主; 16 December 1633 – February/March 1648), Hong Taiji's seventh daughter
    - Married Lamasi (喇瑪思) of the Jarud Borjigit clan in 1645
- As Consort Zhuang:
  - Fulin (福臨; 15 March 1638 – 5 February 1661), Hong Taiji's ninth son, enthroned on 8 October 1643 as the Shunzhi Emperor

== Portraits ==
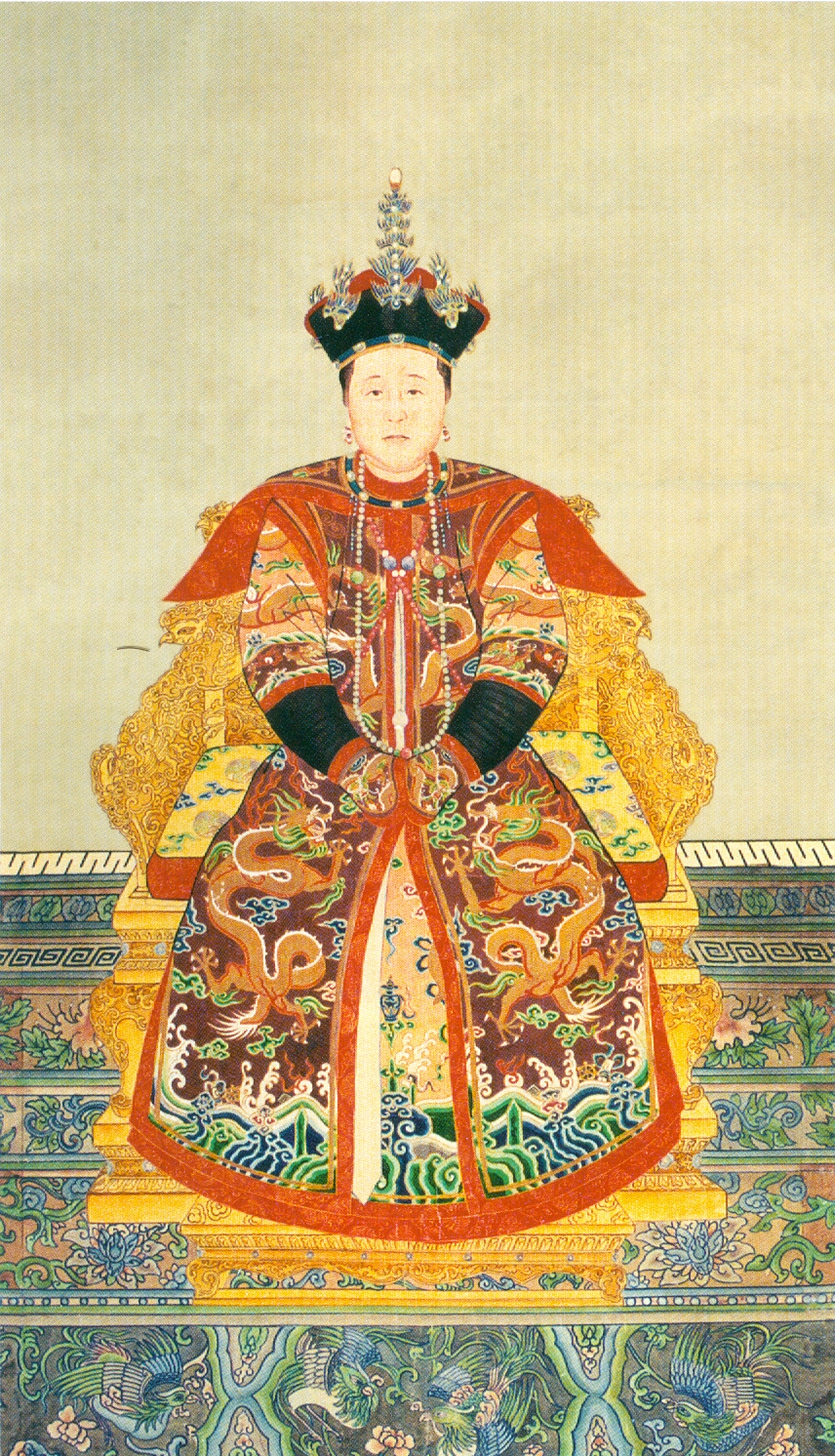
"Portrait of Consort Zhuang in court costume" (莊妃朝服像) painted on a paper scroll (92 x 53 cm).

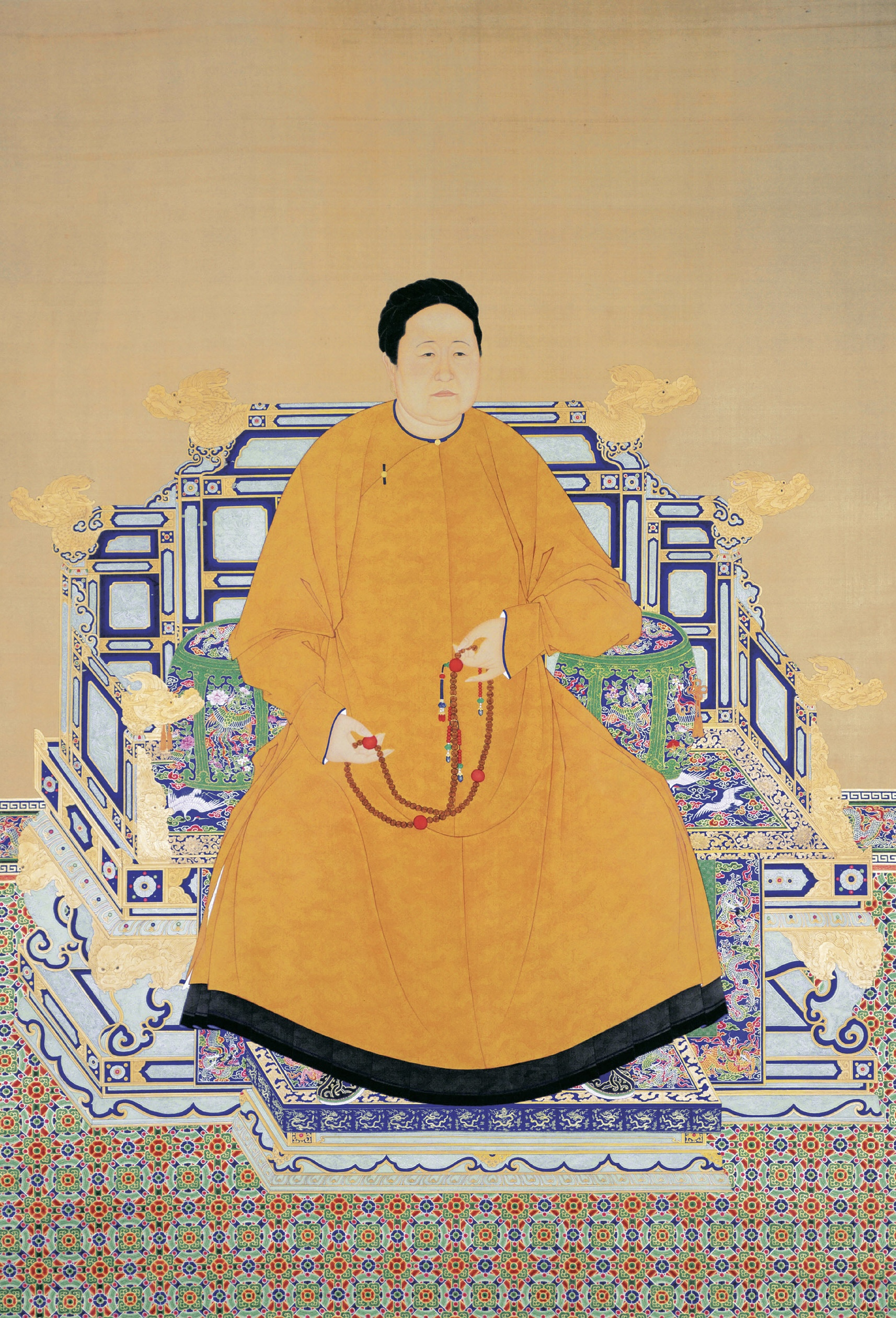
Official imperial portrait of Bumbutai, Empress Dowager Zhaosheng.

== Modern references ==
=== Literature ===
- Xiaozhuang Mishi (孝莊秘史), a novel about Bumbutai, written by Yang Haiwei (楊海薇).
- Shaonian Tianzi (少年天子), a novel about the Shunzhi Emperor, written by Ling Li.
- The Green Phoenix: A Novel of the Woman Who Re-made Asia, Empress Xiaozhuang, written by Alice Poon.

=== Television ===
- The Rise and Fall of Qing Dynasty, a long-running Hong Kong television series about the history of the Qing dynasty. Bumbutai appears only in the first season, aired in 1987, in which she is portrayed by Nora Miao.
- Zhuangfei Yishi (莊妃軼事), a 1989 Chinese television series about Bumbutai, starring Bo Han (柏寒).
- Yidai Huanghou Dayu'er (一代皇后大玉兒), a 1992 Taiwanese television series about Bumbutai, starring Angela Pan.
- Xinyue Gege (新月格格), a 1995 Chinese romantic television series based on a novel by Chiung Yao. Leanne Liu portrayed Bumbutai.
- Princess Huai-yu (懷玉公主), a 2000 Taiwanese romantic television series. Leanne Liu portrayed Bumbutai.
- Kangxi Dynasty, a 2001 Chinese television series about the Kangxi Emperor. Siqin Gaowa portrayed Bumbutai.
- Shaonian Tianzi (少年天子), a 2002 Chinese television series based on Ling Li's novel, starring Pan Hong as Bumbutai.
- The Affaire in the Swing Age, a 2003 Chinese television series depicting the events in the transition of the Ming dynasty to the Qing dynasty. Niu Li portrayed Bumbutai, who was known as Consort Zhuang in the series.
- Xiaozhuang Mishi, a 2003 Chinese television series about Bumbutai, starring Ning Jing.
- Huang Taizi Mishi, a 2004 Chinese television series about Yinreng. Lü Zhong portrayed Bumbutai.
- Sheizhu Chenfu (誰主沉浮), a 2005 Chinese television series depicting the events in the transition of the Ming dynasty to the Qing dynasty. Liu Xiaoqing portrayed Bumbutai.
- Yanhua Sanyue (煙花三月), a 2005 Chinese television series about Nalan Rongruo. Gua Ah-leh portrayed Bumbutai.
- Shaonian Kangxi (少年康熙), a 2005 Chinese television series about Bumbutai and the young Kangxi Emperor, starring Pan Hong and Deng Chao.
- Secret History of Kangxi, a 2006 Chinese television series about the Kangxi Emperor. Wu Qianqian portrayed Bumbutai.
- Da Qing Fengyun, a 2006 Chinese television series based on the romance between Bumbutai and Dorgon. Xu Qing portrayed Xiaozhuang and Zhang Fengyi portrayed Dorgon.
- The Life and Times of a Sentinel, a 2011 Hong Kong historical fiction television series. Ching Hor-wai portrayed Bumbutai.
- In Love With Power, a 2012 Chinese television series dramatising the life of Bumbutai during her early years, as consort to Hong Taiji and as mother to the Shunzhi Emperor. She is portrayed by Yuan Shanshan
- The Legend of Xiao Zhuang, a 2015 Chinese television series that chronicles the life of Bumbutai, and the titular character is portrayed by Jing Tian.
- Rule the World (TV series) is a 2015 television series which chronicles the tale of Harjol. Bumbutai is portrayed by Cao Mengge.
- Royal Romance is a 2015 television series where Bumbutai is portrayed by Anita Yuen. Bumbutai is shown to be the biggest roadblock for the love between Shunzhi Emperor and Consort Donggo.
- Legend of Dragon Pearl, also known as Longzhu; a 2017 Chinese television series where Bumbutai is portrayed by Siqin Gaowa in her later years, as Grand Empress Dowager during the reign of Kangxi Emperor.

=== Games ===
- Europa Universalis IV is a grand strategy video game that has a depiction of Bumbutai as one of its loading screens.

== See also ==
- Ranks of imperial consorts in China#Qing
- Royal and noble ranks of the Qing dynasty

Empress Xiaozhuangwen House of Borjigin (Боржигин) (1206–1688)
Chinese royalty
New title Dynasty established	Empress dowager of the Qing dynasty 21 September 1643 – 5 February 1661 with Jerjer, Empress Dowager (Xiaoduanwen) (1643–1649)	Succeeded by Alatan Qiqige, Empress Dowager Renxian (Xiaohuizhang) of the Borjigit clan ----------- Empress Dowager Cihe (Xiaokangzhang) of the Tunggiya clan
