= Da Qing Fengyun =

- DVD cover art
- Also known as: Qing Gong Fengyun
- 大清风云 / 清宫风云
- Genre: Historical drama
- Written by: Lu Xinguo
- Directed by: Chen Jialin
- Presented by: Yang Buting; Li Kangsheng; Wang Qing; Jiang Peizhen
- Starring: Zhang Fengyi; Xu Qing; Jiang Wen
- Ending theme: "Unexpected Twist of Fate" (阴错阳差) by Yuan Yuan
- Country of origin: China
- Original language: Mandarin
- No. of episodes: 42

Production
- Executive producer: Zhu Cheng
- Producers: Zhang Changhui; Yang Dejian; Wang Dongchao; Zheng Chuan; Wang Lei
- Production location: China
- Cinematography: Chen Ke; Hu Zuguang
- Editor: Zhou Xinxia
- Running time: ≈45 minutes per episode
- Production companies: China Film Group Corporation; Emei Film Group

Original release
- Network: CCTV
- Release: 4 September 2006

Da Qing Fengyun (大清风云; Melodrama of the Great Qing), alternatively known as Qing Gong Fengyun (清宫风云; Melodrama in the Qing Palace), is a 2006 Chinese television series directed by Chen Jialin, starring Zhang Fengyi, Xu Qing and Jiang Wen. Set in 17th-century China, the series follows the events of the transition from the Ming dynasty to the Qing dynasty, focusing particularly on the historical figures Dorgon, Empress Dowager Xiaozhuang, and Huangtaiji.

== Synopsis ==
The story is set in 17th-century China. Dorgon, a son of the Qing dynasty's founder Nurhaci, has proven himself in battle and set his sights on conquering the Ming dynasty. While Dorgon is away fighting at the frontline, his half-brother Huangtaiji not only succeeds their father as the ruler, but also marries Dorgon's lover Dayuer. Although Dorgon feels outraged, he understands the importance of maintaining political stability, so he focuses on attacking the Ming dynasty and emerges victorious at the Battle of Shanhai Pass.

Not long later, Huangtaiji dies of illness without naming an heir, causing a succession crisis. A council is convened to decide the next ruler, with Dorgon and Huangtaiji's eldest son Hooge as the foremost candidates. To avoid a power struggle, the council chooses Fulin, Huangtaiji and Dayuer's son, to be the new emperor. Dayuer becomes empress dowager, while Dorgon rules as prince regent on behalf of the underage Fulin.

As prince regent, Dorgon continues to lead Qing forces to complete the conquest of the Ming dynasty. Throughout this time, he is tempted on multiple occasions to seize the throne, with support from his brother Dodo and others who see him as having earned the right to be emperor through his achievements.

As Fulin grows older, he learns about the past relationship between his mother and Dorgon, and starts to view Dorgon as a threat, especially after Dorgon keeps delaying handing over the reins of power and proposes to marry Dayuer. Meanwhile, Dayuer also finds herself torn between her love for Dorgon and her duty to protect Fulin. Both sides reach a political stalemate. At one point, after Dorgon's brother Dodo fails to assassinate Fulin, Dorgon decides to go to war with Fulin. However, Dayuer manages to prevent bloodshed by threatening to commit suicide if either side attacks.

Following the crisis, Fulin realises how much his mother truly loves Dorgon, so he agrees to their marriage. Dorgon, on the other hand, finally agrees to give up his power and spend the rest of his life with Dayuer.

== Cast ==
- Zhang Fengyi as Dorgon
- Xu Qing as Dayuer
- Jiang Wen as Huangtaiji
- Sun Chun as Fan Haozheng
- Wang Huichun as Fan Haomin
- Li Guangjie as Dodo
- Lu Xingyu as Hooge
- Tao Huimin as Lady Abahai
- Yang Lishan as Ajige
- Guo Tao as Oboi
- Xu Fengnian as He Luohui
- Tang Yinuo as Fulin
  - Daichi Harashima as Fulin (younger)
- Yang Zheng as Shuoguo
- Ma Jing as Xiuxiu
- Wang Biao as Imperial Physician Jin
- Zhang Hao as Suksaha
- Xu Zhengyun as Jirgalang
- Han Xiao as Sulan
- Hou Zhengmin as Liu Guangcai
- Xu Baozhong as Sonin
- Liao Bingyan as Daišan
- Li Mei as Mrs Fan
- Wang Shujun as Zheng Dehai
- Chen Jianyue as Harjol
