= Bad Guys Always Die =

- Poster
- Chinese: 坏蛋必须死
- Directed by: Sun Hao
- Written by: Sun Hao
- Produced by: Feng Xiaogang; Kang Je-gyu
- Starring: Chen Bolin; Son Ye-jin; Qiao Zhenyu; Shin Hyun-joon; Yang Xuwen; Ding Wenbo; Guan Xiaotong
- Music by: Chung Joong-Han
- Production companies: Beijing Xinliliang Entertainment; Huayi Brothers Media Group; Dongxi Dadao Xingzhi Media; Heyi Capital; Huayi Brother International; Heyi Pictures; Beijing Xinbaoyuan Entertainment Investment; China Film Co-Production Corporation
- Distributed by: Huayi Brothers Media Group; China Film Group Corporation
- Release dates: 2 October 2015 (Busan International Film Festival); 27 November 2015 (China); 7 January 2016 (South Korea)
- Running time: 104 minutes
- Countries: China; South Korea
- Languages: Korean; Mandarin
- Box office: CN¥45.7 million (China)

Bad Guys Always Die (Chinese: 坏蛋必须死) is a 2015 action comedy film directed by Sun Hao. A China-South Korean co-production, the film was released in China on 27 November 2015 and in South Korea on 7 January 2016.

== Plot ==
Qingzi, a Chinese language teacher at an elementary school in Busan, and his younger brother and two friends, while on a tour of Jeju island, came across what looks like a car accident with an injured Korean woman, Ji-yeon, at the driver's seat. When they try to bring her to the hospital, they end up being involved in the events of a murder and a kidnapping.

== Cast ==
- Chen Bolin - Qiangzi
- Son Ye-jin - Ji-yeon
- Qiao Zhenyu - San'er
- Shin Hyun-joon - killer
- Jang Gwang - Local station police-in-charge
- Yang Xuwen - Pa-pa
- Ding Wenbo - Datou
- Park Chul-min - Catholic priest
- Guan Xiaotong - a Chinese girl with San-er
- Wi Ha-joon - Cha Myung-ho

== Reception ==
The film grossed US$4.88 million on its opening weekend at the Chinese box office.
