= The Legend of the Condor Heroes (2017 TV series) =

2017 Chinese TV series

- Official poster
- 射雕英雄传
- Genre: Wuxia
- Based on: The Legend of the Condor Heroes by Jin Yong
- Screenplay by: Shen Yuchen; Wang Ziqi; Zhao Weina; Xu Tao
- Directed by: Jeffrey Chiang
- Presented by: Gong Yu; Wang Jianjun; Zhao Yifang; Chi Yufeng; Yue Lina
- Starring: Yang Xuwen; Li Yitong; Chen Xingxu; Meng Ziyi
- Opening theme: "I Won't Return" (我不归去) by KaYee Tam
- Composer: Joseph Koo
- Country of origin: China
- Original language: Mandarin
- No. of episodes: 52

Production
- Producers: Wu Dun; Guo Jingyu; Ge Xufeng; Li Jiewen
- Production location: Xiangshan Film and Television City
- Running time: ≈45 minutes per episode
- Production companies: iQiyi; Huace Media; Beijing Wanmei Jianxin Entertainment; Perfect Pictures

Original release
- Network: Dragon TV
- Release: 9 January – 17 April 2017

The Legend of the Condor Heroes (射雕英雄传) is a 2017 Chinese wuxia television series adapted from the novel of the same title by Jin Yong. A remake of the 1983 Hong Kong television series of the same title, it was directed by Jeffrey Chiang and starred Yang Xuwen, Li Yitong, Chen Xingxu and Meng Ziyi in the lead roles. It started airing on Dragon TV in mainland China on 9 January 2017, and on TVB Jade in Hong Kong on 8 May 2017.

== Cast ==
- Yang Xuwen as Guo Jing
  - Dong-Li Wuyou as Guo Jing (child)
- Li Yitong as Huang Rong
- Chen Xingxu as Yang Kang
- Meng Ziyi as Mu Nianci
- Zhao Lixin as Hong Qigong
- Michael Miu as Huang Yaoshi
- Ray Lui as Reverend Yideng
- Zhang Yonggang/Hei Zi as Ouyang Feng
- Ning Wentong as Zhou Botong
- Han Dong as Wang Chongyang
- Li Zonghan as Yang Tiexin
- Liu Qianhan as Bao Xiruo
- Shao Bing as Guo Xiaotian
- Zeng Li as Li Ping
- Zong Fengyan as Wanyan Honglie
- Mi Lu as Mei Chaofeng
- Liu Zhiyang as Ouyang Ke
- Tay Ping Hui as Genghis Khan
- Hou Ruixiang as Tolui
  - Zhang Zihao as Tolui (child)
- Dai Wenwen as Huazheng
- Fu Tianjiao as Jebe
- Nuomin Darong as Jochi
- Ailiku as Chagatai
- Baodi as Ögedei
- Sulide as Borokhula
- Anqi'er as Muqali
- Hongtong Batu as Jamukha
- Wurijitu as Wang Khan
- Baisha as Sangkun
- Gangde'er as Dushi
  - Gao Yuyang as Dushi (child)
- Shao Feng as Qiu Chuji
- Wang Li as Ma Yu
- Guo Jun as Wang Chuyi
- Zhao Qiusheng as Tan Chuduan
- Liu Wei as Hao Datong
- Song Tao as Liu Chuxuan
- Zhao Cong as Sun Bu'er
- Wang Kuirong as Ke Zhen'e
- Ji Chenmu as Zhu Cong
- Wang Chunyuan as Han Baoju
- Ma Jingjing as Nan Xiren
- Xin Peng as Zhang Asheng
- Long De as Quan Jinfa
- Xiao Yin as Han Xiaoying
- Zhang Kaiyi as Yinggu
- Jiang Yiming as Qiu Qianren / Qiu Qianzhang
- Xia Zitong as Shagu
- Li Yixiao as Feng Heng
- Gong Zhengnan as Lu Guanying
- Sui Yumeng as Cheng Yaojia
- Song Qing as Lu Youjiao
- Chang Cheng as Lu Chengfeng
- Zhang Jialai as Chen Xuanfeng
- Wang Lin as Yin Zhiping
- Ren Xihong as Lingzhi Shangren
- Gao Yuqing as Liang Ziweng
- Lin Yizheng as Sha Tongtian
- Gu Dechao as Hou Tonghai
- Sun Hao as Peng Lianhu
- Yu Ailei as Duan Tiande
- Hou Tongjiang as Reverend Kumu
- Cao Yang as Wanyan Hongxi
- Hu Bo as Chu Dongshan
- Zhang Lu as Zhang Shaoshou
- Yin Shuo as Wu Santong
- Liang Jinshan as Zhu Ziliu
- Lu Senbao as Elder Peng
- Fan Zhonghua as Elder Jian
- Liu Yu as Elder Liang
- Jia Jin as Ma Qingxiong
- Liu Taotao as Qian Qingjian
- Zhao Shuai as Wu Qinglie
- Fan Jianyun as Shen Qinggang
- Xu Qihang as Yu Zhaoxing
- He Guoxuan as Li Sheng
- Cheng Liuyi as Muhammad II of Khwarezm
- Yang Yongwen as Lü Wende

== Production ==
The series was filmed primarily at the Xiangshan Film and Television City in Zhejiang. Shooting wrapped up in late August 2016. Other filming locations include the Hengdian World Studios, Xiandu Scenic Area in Jinyun County and Xianju County in Zhejiang, Huanghe Shilin Scenic Area in Jingtai County and Tianzhu Grasslands in Gansu, and Tonghu Grasslands in Inner Mongolia. Although this series is one of many television series adaptations of The Legend of the Condor Heroes, it is the first one to be produced since Jin Yong last revised the novel.

In a January 2017 interview, producer Guo Jingyu explained why he produced a television series based on a wuxia novel which already has more than 10 earlier adaptations. He said that he is dissatisfied with many of the wuxia television series produced in recent years, and wanted to remake the 1983 Hong Kong television series The Legend of the Condor Heroes, which he enjoyed watching, for younger generations of viewers. He also explained the challenges he faced in operating with a very tight budget and time constraints, such as having to reduce the use of special effects and having to cast less well-known actors and actresses in the lead roles.

== Episodes ==
The series originally aired in 2 episodes daily on Dragon Television, Monday through Sunday from 19:30 to 21:00.

No.	Title	Original release date	Viewers (millions)
1	"Episode 1"	January 9, 2017	N/A
Sixty years after the Jingkang incident in 1202, in the village of Niujia (牛家村), it is snowing heavily. The sworn brothers, Guo Xiaotian and Yang Tiexin, are drinking and eating when they noticed Qiu Chuji, a Taoist priest and one of the Seven True Daoists of Quanzhen sect, approaching with impressive "Lightness" skill (walking through snow and leaving no prints). They immediately invite Qiu Chuji to join them. Qiu Chuji enters their home cautiously, suspecting that they may be working for the government. Because of his cautious behavior, Yang Tiexin starts to suspect Qiu Chuji might be a killer and attacks him. During the fight, Yang uses Yang Family style spear (杨家枪) to which Qiu recognizes and he immediately stops attacking Yang. After the fight, they tell Qiu that they are descendants of loyal generals. Meanwhile a large Jin army invades Niujia village and approaches their home. Qiu tells them the Jin army is after him because he had just beheaded the traitor Wang Daoqian (王道乾), a corrupt traitor of Song. Qiu ends up killing all of them. At dinner, the two men ask Qiu to name their unborn children. He took out two daggers on which he carved the names of the unborn children, as gifts to them. Li Ping, wife of Guo Xiaotian, and Bao Xiruo, wife of Yang Tiexin, exchange the daggers as keepsakes. That evening, Bao Xiruo finds one of the attackers hiding in the woodshed, heavily injured and decides to save him. He turns out to be the Sixth Prince of Jin Empire, Wanyan Honglie. Three months later, Wanyan Honglie orders Duan Tiande, a local military official and traitor of Song Empire, to capture Guo Xiaotian and Yang Tiexin. Guo Xiaotian is killed by Duan Tiande's men, Li Ping is captured and held hostage while Yang Tiexin is kicked off a cliff by Duan Tiande. Bao Xiruo is rescued by Wanyan Honglie. When Qiu Chuji returns to Niujia village, he sees a hanged body of Guo Xiaotian at the village center. Qiu Chuji vows to avenge him. Upon learning that Qiu is after him for revenge, Duan Tiande takes Li Ping, dressing her as a soldier, to hide at Fahua Temple (法华寺), after lying to the abbot, Master Jiaomu. Qiu Chuji arrives at the temple and asks Master Jiaomu the whereabouts of Duan Tiande. Master Jiaomu promises to give Qiu Chuji an answer in three days at Zuixian Pavilion (醉仙楼). Three days later at Zuixian Pavilion, Zhu Cong (nee "Marvellous-Handed School") steals Wanyan Honglie's money. Bao Xiruo witnesses Wanyan Honglie summoning Gai Yuncong (盖运聪), a local official of Jiaxing Prefecture, who on his knees, hands Wanyan two plates of gold. At night, Bao Xiruo intends to kill Wanyan Honglie but she gives up when she hears Wanyan's blandishments. Instead she tries to commit suicide, but Wanyan stops her.
2	"Episode 2"	January 9, 2017	N/A
Three days later at Zuixian Pavilion, Qiu Chuji demands Master Jiaomu to hand over Duan Tiande, but he refuses. Instead brought reinforcements, the Seven Freaks of Jiangnan, to help with the situation. They fight and defeat Qiu Chuji. Qiu then leaves the scene to head to Fahua Temple in search of Duan Tiande and Li Ping. The Seven Freaks follow him and continue their fight. When both sides have weakened, Duan Tiande shows up with Li Ping and tries to kill Qiu Chuji but is stopped by Li Ping who is then revealed to be the widow. Master Jiaomu realizes he was lied to and attacks Duan Tiande but ends up getting killed. Duan Tiande escapes with Li Ping. Not satisfied with the outcome of their fight, Qiu Chuji and the Seven Freaks of Jiangnan agrees to look for the widows separately and teach the children martial arts, 18 years later, the two young men will compete at Zuixian Pavilion. Li Ping gives birth to a son (Guo Jing) on the battlefield on a snowy day. They are then taken in by some nomads and become part of Temüjin's tribe. Several years later, the young Guo Jing saves an injured Jebe, who is being hunted by Temüjin's army. One of Temüjin's inferior tries to force Guo Jing to tell them where Jebe is hiding, but the boy remains silent. Upon seeing that, Jebe shows up and challenges Borokhula, a follower of Temüjin, in an archery contest. He defeats him and was allowed to join the Temujin's army. Temüjin orders Jebe to teach Guo Jing and Tolui, the fourth son of Temüjin, archery and riding. The Sixth Prince Wanyan Honglie and his elder brother, the Third Prince Wanyan Hongxi, arrives at the borderland of Mongolia. The Third Prince throws gold coins at the crowd. Guo Jing picks up some gold coins on the ground and throws them back at the Third Prince. The angry prince grabs a spear and aims at Guo Jing.
3	"Episode 3"	January 10, 2017	N/A
Jebe shoots down the flying spear. Wanyan Honglie stops his brother when he was about to pull out his sword. In the Mongolian yurt, Wanyan Honglie bestows on Temüjin an official post, which arouses envy of Sangkun and Jamukha. Guo Jing becomes anda (sworn brothers) with Tolui. The Seven Freaks of Jiangnan is also in the area looking for Guo Jing and his mother. They encounter Guo Jing while Dushi reaves Guo Jing and Tolui's hare and beats them. The Seven Freaks of Jiangnan also chanced upon piles of bones in the area, Ke Zhen'e (nee "Flying Bat") deduces that the "Twin Killers in the Dark Wind" are the killers. They decide to ambush the "Twin Killers in the Dark Wind" at night. Guo Jing stabs Chen Xuanfeng to death after his fifth master, Zhang Asheng, was killed by Chen trying to rescue Han Xiaoying, Zhang Asheng's love interest and Guo Jing's seventh master. Huazheng, Temüjin's daughter and Guo Jing's dear friend, tells Guo Jing that a group of black eagles are besieging a couple of white eagles. In order to rescue the white eagles, Guo Jing shoots the two black eagles with one arrow. Temüjin awards Guo Jing a gold sword after Guo Jing proffers his preys. Guo Jing encounters Ma Yu, one of the Seven Immortals of Quanzhen sect, when they planning to adopt the eyas of the white eagles. After Ma Yu helps them to take the nest from the cliff, Guo Jing asks Ma Yu to accept him as a disciple.
4	"Episode 4"	January 11, 2017	N/A
Guo Jing studies out-fight under the Seven Freaks of Jiangnan in the daytime and studies the Quanzhen sect under Ma Yu in the evening. A akhal-teke horse runs in the haras, Han Baoju (nee "Horse Deity"), Guo Jing's master, tries to subdue the horse, but he fails and his disciple Guo Jing success. They give it to Guo Jing as a prize. Guo Jing's skill has grown by leaps and bounds, which arouses the Seven Freaks of Jiangnan's suspicions, they conclude that Guo Jing studies martial arts under others. So they decide to track Guo Jing. At dusk, Guo Jing and Ma Yu stumble on Mei Chaofeng practising the "Nine Yin White Bone Claw" (九阴白骨爪) with human skulls. Guo Jing and Ma Yu come after Mei Chaofeng all the way to the Mongolian yurts of Sangkun. The Seven Freaks of Jiangnan decide to kill Guo Jing after they find some human skulls on the top of a hill. Guo Jing stands outside the Mongolian yurt of Sangkun and hears Sangkun, Jamukha and Wanyan Honglie plotting to kill Temüjin in the name of discussing marriage between Dushi and Huazheng. Guo Jing and Ma Yu return home, they tells the Seven Freaks of Jiangnan that Mei Chaofeng is looking for revenge for them. Guo Jing informs Huazheng that Sangkun and Wanyan Honglie plot to kill his father, Temüjin. At night, Ma Yu and the Seven Freaks of Jiangnan disguise themselves as the Seven True Daoists of Quanzhen sect in the hill, where Mei Chaofeng practised martial arts, and plot to kill Mei Chaofeng. Mei Chaofeng leaves the hostage Huazheng and runs away. Guo Jing informs Temüjin that he has fallen into Sangkun's trap. Temüjin is besieged by Sangkun, he has to retreat to the brae. Guo Jing captures Dushi and defeats the Four Ghost of the Yellow River. Temüjin puts a sword in the neck of Dushi and demands Sangkun withdraw.
5	"Episode 5"	January 11, 2017	N/A
At night, Jamukha travels to Temüjin's barracks to persuade Temüjin to surrender. Temujin refuses and says "You are no longer my friend". Temüjin sends Tolui back for reinforcements. Jamukha attacks Temüjin, after a while, Tolui arrives with reinforcement, and Jamukha withdraws his army. Temüjin releases Dushi and hits Tolui twenty army-stick. Temüjin sends Guo Jing and Jebe to escort Huazheng to Sangkun's domain. In Dushi's tent, Huazheng makes a declaration of love to Guo Jing. When the drunk Dushi comes in, he sees Guo Jing holding Huazheng. The jealous Dushi presses Guo Jing to the ground. In order to rescue Guo Jing, Huazheng kills Dushi with a stab to the heart. Jebe sets fire to Sangkun's camp, at the same time, Temujin leads his army storms into Sangkun's barracks. Temüjin unifies the Mongolian tribes through the war, and he is accorded the title of Genhis Khan. In the celebration party, Genhis Khan awards Guo Jing the rank of chiliarch and betroths his daughter Huazheng to Guo Jing. Guo Jing and the Seven Freaks of Jiangnan go back to Zhejiang. Guo Jing saves a beggar who is sneaking off while a pedlar is running after her. Guo Jing treat the hungry beggar to have a big meal.

== Ratings ==
Air date	Episode	Dragon TV CSM52 City ratings	
Air date	Episode	Ratings	Audience share
2017.1.9	1-2	0.532	2.896
2017.1.10	3-4	0.65	3.514
2017.1.16	5-6	0.653	3.488
2017.1.17	7-8	0.513	2.680
2017.1.23	9-10	0.648	3.267
2017.1.24	11-12	0.675	3.290
2017.2.6	13-14	0.466	2.253
2017.2.7	15-16	0.613	2.998
2017.2.13	17-18	0.502	2.798
2017.2.14	19-20	0.446	2.517
2017.2.20	21-22	0.445	2.527
2017.2.21	23-24	0.554	3.076
2017.2.27	25-26	0.549	3.312
2017.2.28	27-28	0.424	2.489

== International broadcast ==
Region	Network	Dates
Mainland China	Dragon TV	9 January – 17 April 2017
Hong Kong	TVB Jade (Hong Kong)	8 May – 14 July 2017
Malaysia	Astro On Demand; TVB Jade (Malaysia)	8 May 2017 – 14 July 2017
Singapore	TVB First	8 May 2017 – 14 July 2017
Singapore	VV Drama	21 August 2017 – ?
Australia	TVBJ	11 May 2017 – ?
Hong Kong; Singapore; Malaysia; Indonesia; Philippines	Oh!K	Coming Soon
Thailand	Channel 3	5 June 2018 – 11 October 2018
Indonesia	antv	8 May 2023 – 9 June 2023

== Awards and nominations ==
Year	Award	Category	Nominated work	Result	Ref.
2017	2nd Golden Guduo Media Awards	Best Quality Network & Web Series	The Legend of the Condor Heroes	Won	

== Soundtrack ==
- "Iron Blood and Loyal Heart" (铁血丹心): The opening and ending theme song of the series, composed by Joseph Koo and originally the opening theme song of the 1983 Hong Kong television series The Legend of the Condor Heroes. Although the original version was sung in Cantonese by Roman Tam and Jenny Tseng, the version used in The Legend of the Condor Heroes (2017) is an instrumental version with no lyrics.
- "Loved Who" (爱过谁): An insert song composed by Silence Wong and sung by Shang Wenjie.
- "The World of Martial Arts" (江湖天下): An insert song composed by Tan Xiaocong and sung by Silence Wong.
- "Soul of the Sword" (剑魂): An insert song composed by Silence Wang and sung by Well Lee.
- "The Condor Hero" (射雕英雄): The opening theme song of the TVB release, sung by Hubert Wu.
- "I Won't Return" (我不归去): The ending theme song of the TVB release, sung by Kayee Tam.
