= Hundred Flowers Award for Best Picture =

Chinese film award

The Hundred Flowers Award for Best Picture was first awarded by the China Film Association in 1962.

== Winners and nominees ==
=== 2010s ===
Year	Number	Film	Director
2018	34th	Operation Red Sea	Dante Lam
2018	34th	Runner-up: The Founding of an Army	Andrew Lau
2018	34th	Soul Mate	Derek Tsang
2018	34th	Wolf Warrior 2	Wu Jing
2018	34th	Detective Chinatown 2	Chen Sicheng
2016	33rd	The Dead End	Cao Baoping; Mai Jiao
2016	33rd	Runner-up: Wolf Warrior	Wu Jing
2016	33rd	Mojin: The Lost Legend	Wuershan
2016	33rd	Monster Hunt	Raman Hui
2016	33rd	Goodbye Mr. Loser	Yan Fei; Peng Damo
2014	32nd	The Grandmaster	Wong Kar-wai
2014	32nd	Runner-up: American Dreams in China	Peter Chan
2014	32nd	Runner-up: The Story of Zhou Enlai	Chen Li
2014	32nd	So Young	Zhao Wei
2014	32nd	Finding Mr. Right	Xue Xiaolu
2012	31st	Aftershock	Feng Xiaogang
2012	31st	Runner-up: Love is Not Blind	Teng Huatao
2012	31st	Runner-up: 1911	Jackie Chan; Zhang Li
2012	31st	Go Lala Go!	Xu Jinglei
2012	31st	The Founding of a Party	Huang Jianxin; Han Sanping
2010	30th	The Founding of a Republic\建国大业	Han Sanping 韩三平; Huang Jianxin 黄建新
2010	30th	Runner-up: Mulan\花木兰	Jingle Ma 马楚成
2010	30th	Runner-up: Stands Still, The Last Great Wall\惊天动地	Wang Jia 王珈; Shen Dong 沈东
2010	30th	Bodyguards and Assassins\十月围城	Teddy Chan 陈德森
2010	30th	The Message\风声	Gao Qunshu 高群书

=== 2000s ===
Year	Number	Film	Director
2008	29th	Assembly\集结号	Feng Xiaogang 冯小刚
2008	29th	Runner-up: The Knot\云水谣	Yin Li 尹力
2008	29th	Runner-up: Invisible Wings\隐形的翅膀	Feng Zhenzhi 冯振志
2008	29th	Crazy Stone\疯狂的石头	Ning Hao 宁浩
2008	29th	Tokyo Trial\东京审判	Gao Qunshu 高群书
2006	28th	Zhang Side\张思德	Yin Li 尹力
2006	28th	Runner-up: Kung Fu Hustle\功夫	Stephen Chow 周星驰
2006	28th	Runner-up: Between Life and Death\生死牛玉儒	Zhou Youzhao 周有召
2006	28th	Fearless\霍元甲	Ronny Yu 于仁泰
2006	28th	New Police Story\新警察故事	Benny Chan 陈木胜
2004	27th	Cell Phone\手机	Feng Xiaogang 冯小刚
2004	27th	Runner-up: Warm Spring\暖春	Tana Wulan
2004	27th	Runner-up: A SARS Journey\惊心动魄	Wang Jia 王珈; Shen Dong 沈东
2004	27th	Warriors of Heaven and Earth\天地英雄	He Ping 何平
2004	27th	Goddess of Mercy\玉观音	Ann Hui 许鞍华
2004	27th	38 Degrees\三十八度	Liu Xin 刘新
2004	27th	Sunny Courtyard\阳光天井	Huang Hong 黄宏
2004	27th	Sound of Colors\地下铁	Joe Ma 马伟豪
2004	27th	The Law of Romance\警察有约	Xu Geng 徐耿
2004	27th	Shining Season\灿烂的季节	Song Jiangbo 宋江波
2002	25th	A Young Prisoner's Revenge\法官妈妈	Mu Teyuan
2002	25th	25 Kids and a Dad\二十五个孩子一个爹	Huang Hong
2002	25th	Big Shot's Funeral\大腕	Feng Xiaogang
2000	24th	The Road Home\我的父亲母亲	Zhang Yimou
2000	24th	Lover's Grief over the Yellow River\黄河绝恋	Feng Xiaoning
2000	24th	National Anthem\国歌	Wu Ziniu

=== 1980-1990 ===
Ceremony	Year	Title	S. Chinese Title	Director
3rd	1980	Ji Hongchang	吉鸿昌	Li Guanghui
3rd	1980	Tearstains	泪痕	Li Wenhua
3rd	1980	Little Flower	小花	Zhang Zheng
4th	1981	Romance on Lushan Mountain	庐山恋	Huang Zhumo
4th	1981	Legend of the Tianyun Mountain	天云山传奇	Xie Jin
4th	1981	The Seventh-Rank Sesame Seed-Sized Official	七品芝麻官	Xie Tian
5th	1982	In-Laws	喜盈门	Zhao Huanzhang
5th	1982	Longing for My Native Country	乡情	Hu Bingliu, Wang Jin
5th	1982	The White Snake aka Legend of the White Snake	白蛇传	Fu Chaowu
6th	1983	At Middle Age	人到中年	Wang Qiming, Sun Yu
6th	1983	The Herdsman	牧马人	Xie Jin, Huang Shuqin
6th	1983	Rickshaw Boy	骆驼祥人	Ling Zifeng
7th	1984	Our Niu Baisui	咱们的牛百岁	Zhao Huanzhang
7th	1984	Ward 16	十六号病房	Zhang Yuan, Yu Yanfu
7th	1984	The Story Should Not Have Happened	不该发生的故事	Zhang Hui
8th	1985	Wreaths at the Foot of the Mountain	高山下的花环	Xie Jin
8th	1985	The Girl in Red	红衣少女	Lu Xiaoya
8th	1985	Life	人生	Wu Tianming
9th	1986	Juvenile Delinquents	少年犯	Zhang Liang
9th	1986	Sunrise	日出	Yu Benzheng
9th	1986	Our Retired Veterans	咱们的退伍兵	Zhao Huanzhang
10th	1987	Dr. Sun Yat-sen	孙中山	Ding Yinnan
10th	1987	Hibiscus Town	芙蓉镇	Xie Jin
10th	1987	The Battle of Tai'erzhuang	血战台儿庄	Yang Guangyuan, Zhai Junjie
11th	1988	Red Sorghum	紅高梁	Zhang Yimou
11th	1988	Old Well	老井	Wu Tianming
11th	1988	The Savage Land	原野	Ling Zi
12th	1989	Chun Tao alias A Woman for Two	春桃	Ling Zifeng
12th	1989	The Village of Widows	寡妇村	Wang Jin
12th	1989	The Republic Will Never Forget	共和国不会忘记	Zhai Junjie
13th	1990	Founding Ceremony (aka. After the Final Battle)	开国大典	Li Qiankuan, Xiao Guiyun
13th	1990	Black Snow	本命年	Xie Fei
13th	1990	The Kunlun Column	巍巍昆仑	Hao Guang, Jing Mukui
14th	1991	Jiao Yulu	焦裕祿	Wang Jixing
14th	1991	Dragon Year Cops	龙年警官	Huang Jianzhong, Li Ziyu
14th	1991	Peking Duck Restaurant	老店	Gu Rong
15th	1992	Decisive Engagement: The Liaoxi Shenyang Campaign	大决战	Li Jun
15th	1992	Zhou Enlai	周恩来	Ding Yinnan
15th	1992	The Spring Festival	过年	Huang Jianzhong
16th	1993	Raise the Red Lantern	大红灯笼高高挂	Zhang Yimou
16th	1993	The Story of Qiu Ju	秋菊打官司	Zhang Yimou
16th	1993	Yang Guifei	杨贵妃	Lin Jialin
17th	1994	Country Teachers	凤凰琴	He Qun
17th	1994	Chongqing Negotiation	重庆谈判	Li Qiankuan, Xiao Guiyun, Zhang Yifei
17th	1994	An Artillery Major	炮兵少校	Zhao Weiheng
18th	1995	The Accused Uncle Shangang	被告山杠爷	Fan Yuan
18th	1995	Probation within the Village	留村查看	Lei Xianhe, Wang Xingdong
18th	1995	A Fatherless Girl	一个独生女的故事	Guo Lin
19th	1996	Red Cherry	红樱桃	Ye Daying
19th	1996	The July 7th Incident	七七事变	Li Xiankuan, Xiao Guiyun
19th	1996	The Strangers in Beijing	混在北京	He Qun
20th	1997	Red River Valley aka A Tale of the Sacred Mountain	红河谷	Feng Xiaoning
20th	1997	The Breakthrough 2	大转折	Wei Lian
20th	1997	Days Without a Hero	离开雷锋的日子	Lei Xianhe, Kang Ning
21st	1998	The Dream Factory	甲方乙方	Feng Xiaogang; Jiang Feng
21st	1998	The Opium War	鸦片战争	Xie Jin
21st	1998	The Long March	长征	Zhai Junjie
22nd	1999	Male Sorority Director	男妇女主任	Zhang Huizhong
22nd	1999	The Matchmaker	红娘	Huang Jianzhong
22nd	1999	Not One Less	一个都不能少	Zhang Yimou

=== 1960s ===
Year	Number	Film	Director
1964	3nd		
1963	2nd	Li Shuangshuang\李双双	Lu Ren 鲁韧
1962	1st	The Red Detachment of Women\红色娘子兵	Xie Jin 谢晋
