= Hundred Flowers Award for Best Actress =

Chinese biennial film award

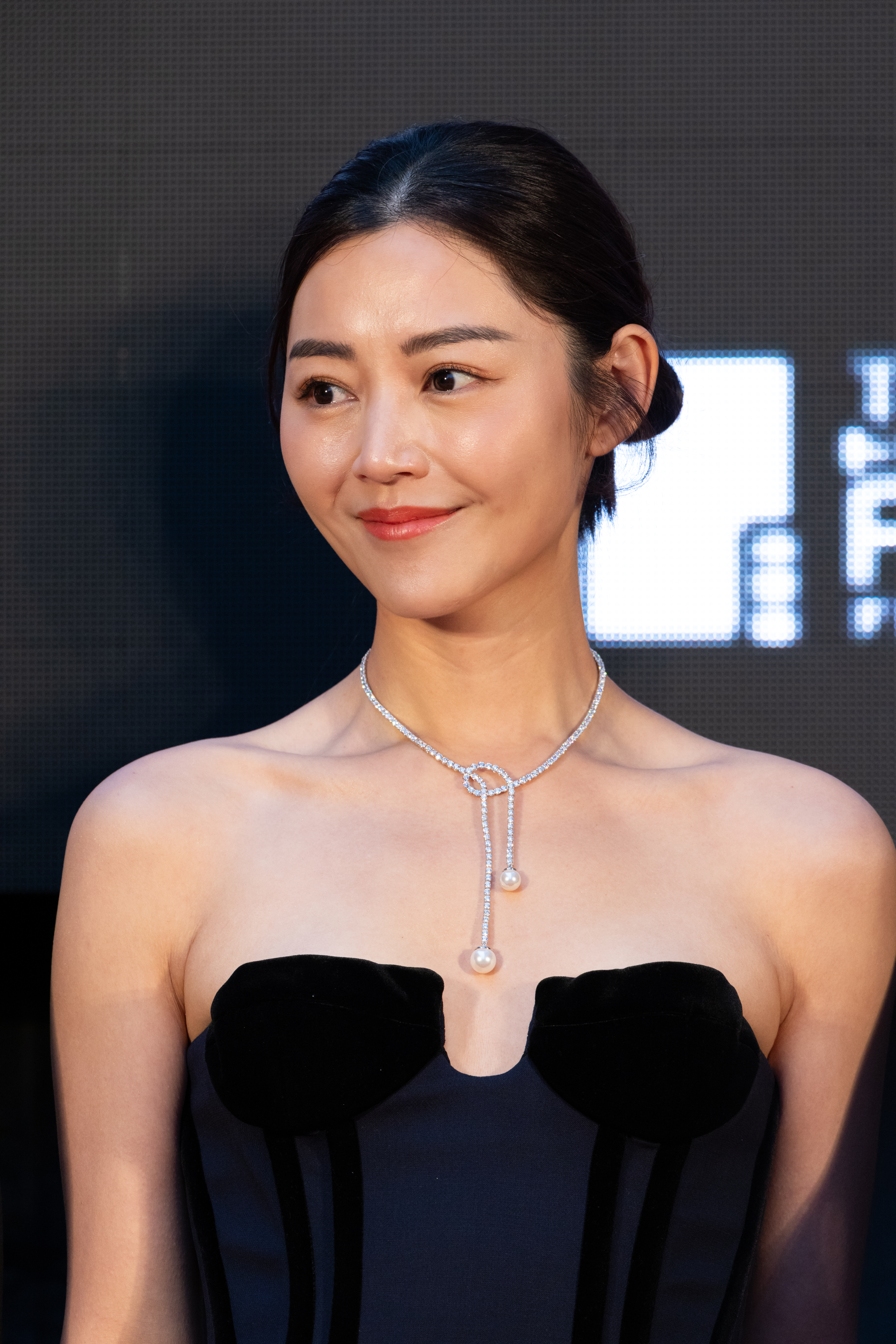
- The 2026 recipient: Michelle Wai
- Country: China
- Presented by: China Federation of Literary and Art Circles and China Film Association
- First award: 1962
- Currently held by: Michelle Wai for The Last Dance (2026)

The Hundred Flowers Award for Best Actress (Chinese: 大众电影百花奖最佳女主角) was first presented in 1962. Chinese actress Liu Xiaoqing holds the record for the most wins in this category, with three.

== Winners and nominees ==
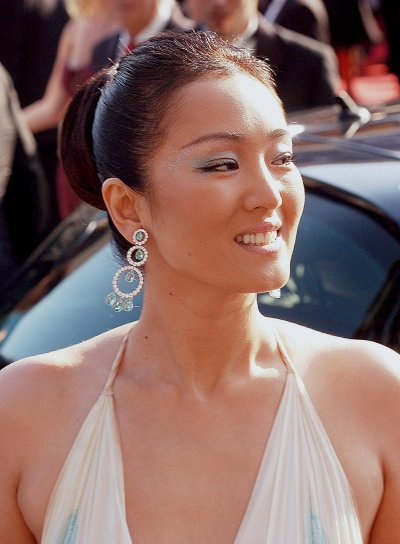
Gong Li won twice, in 1993 for Raise the Red Lantern and in 2001 for Breaking the Silence.

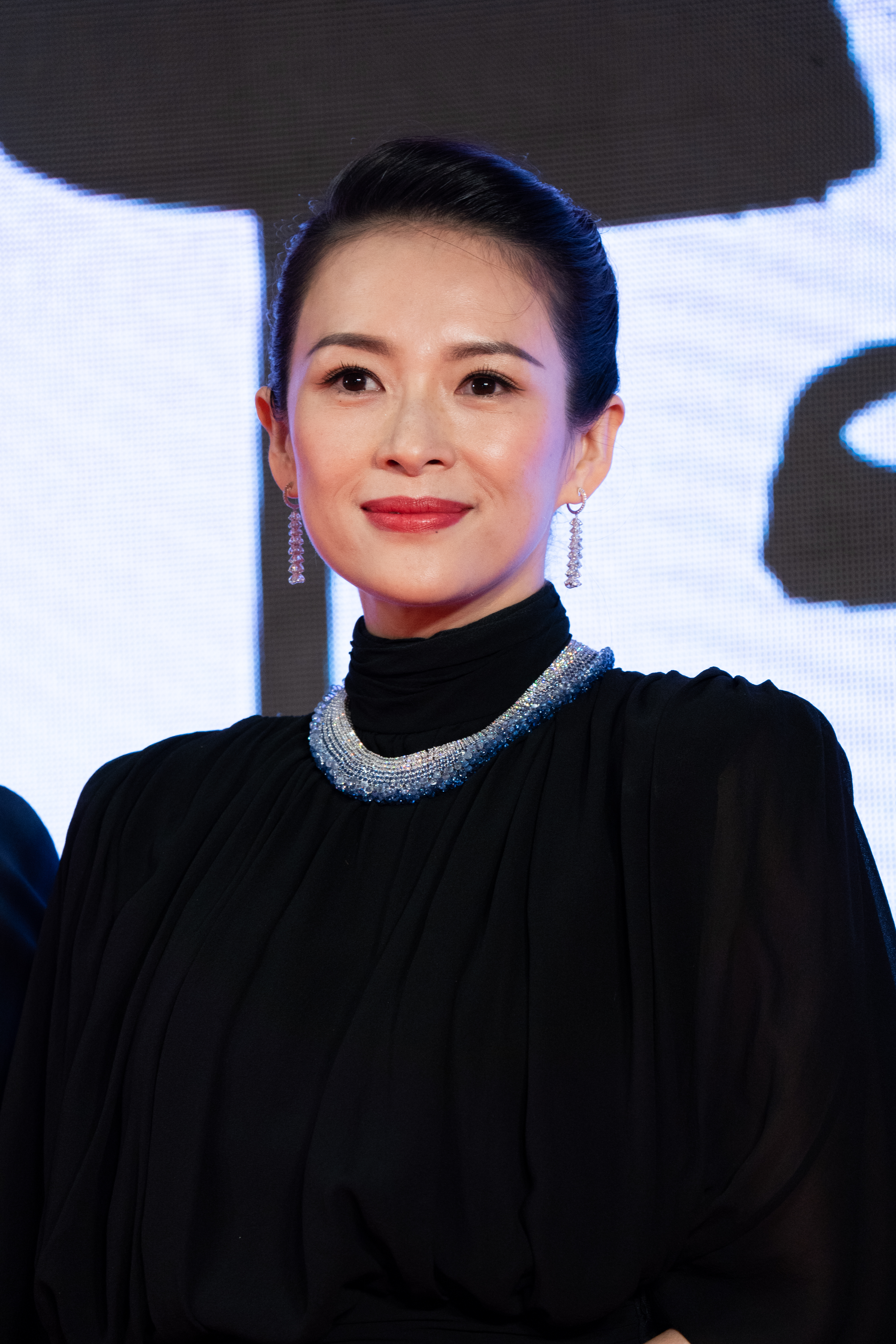
Zhang Ziyi won twice, in 2000 for The Road Home and in 2014 for The Grandmaster.

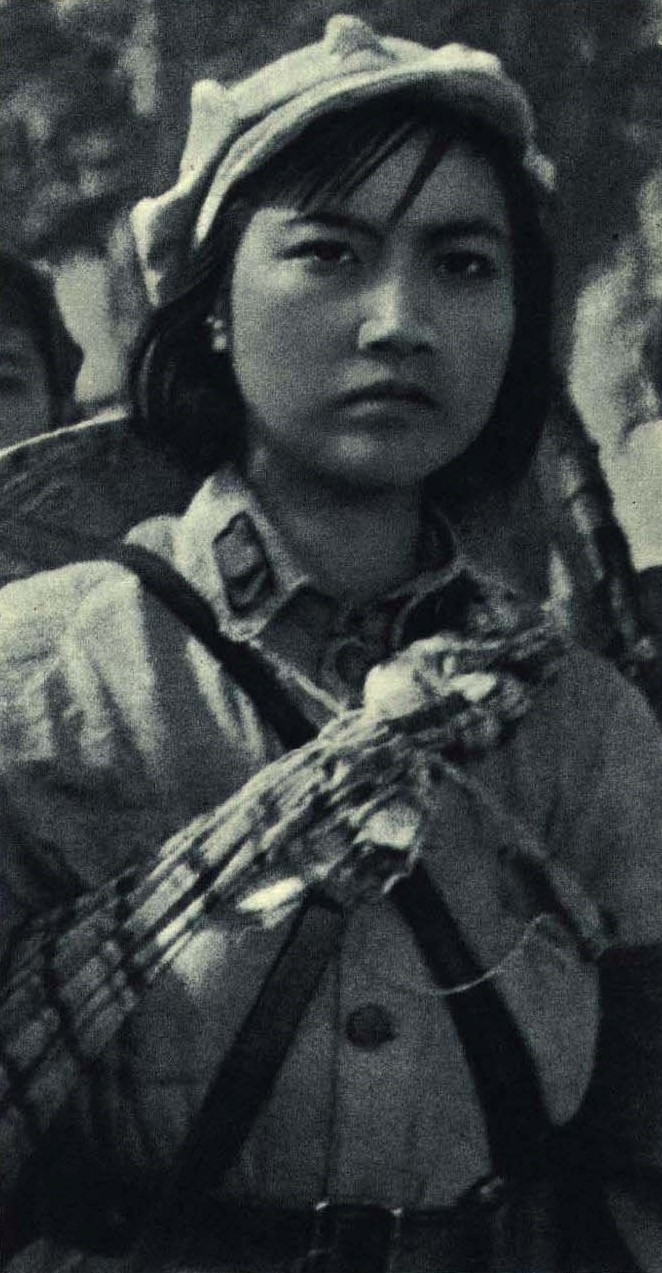
Zhu Xijuan won in 1962 for The Red Detachment of Women.

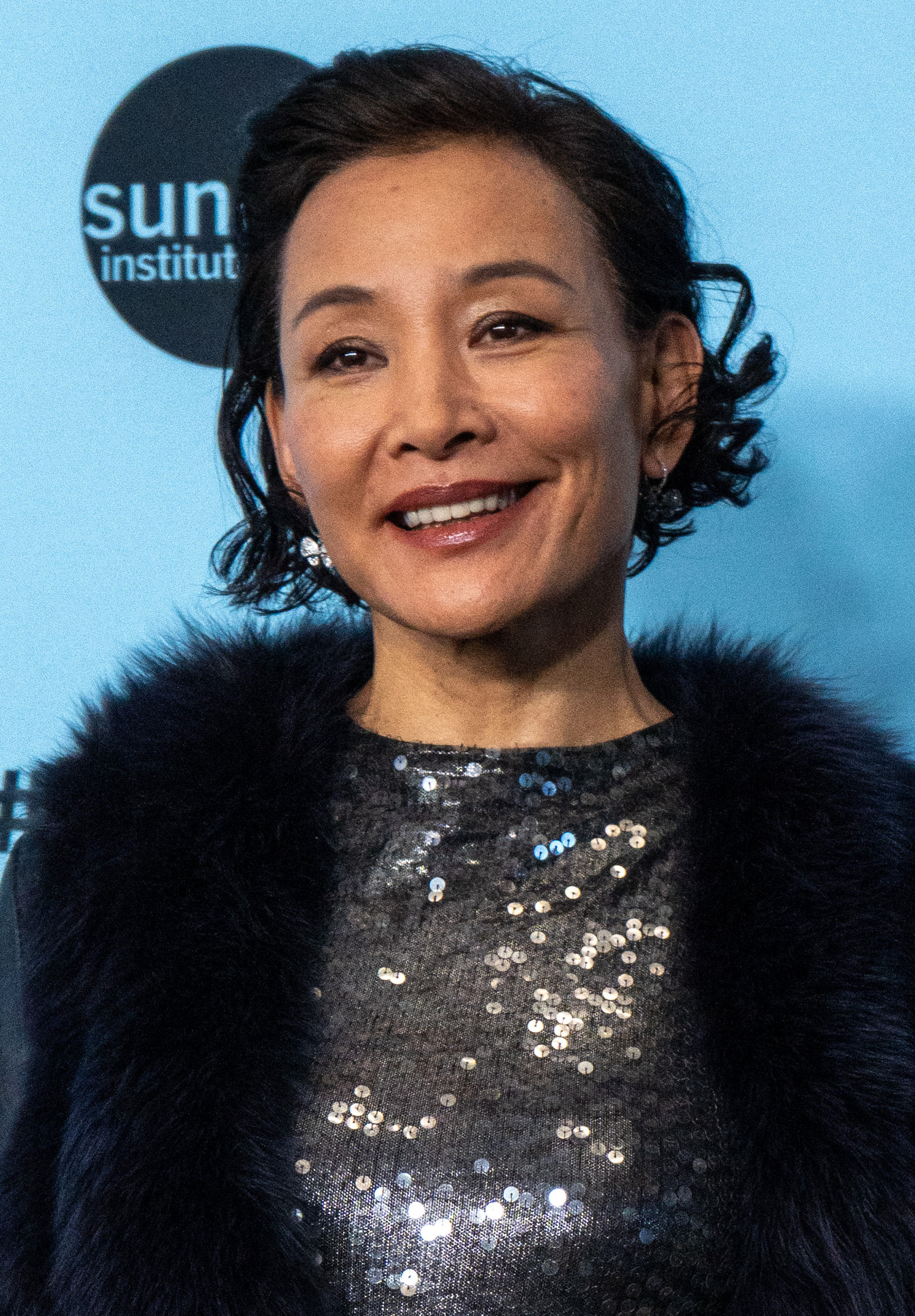
Joan Chen won in 1980 for Little Flower.

Zhou Xun won in 2002 for A Pinwheel Without Wind.

Fan Bingbing won in 2004 for Cell Phone.

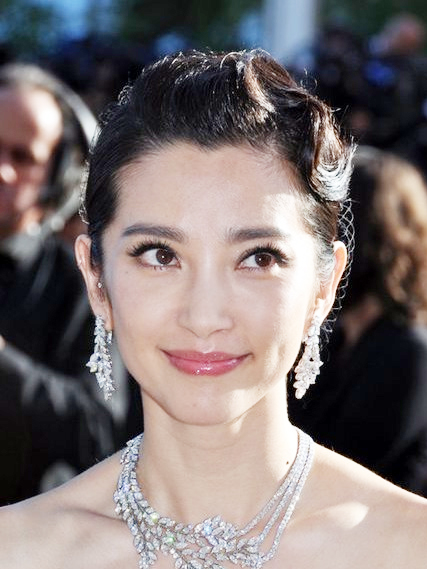
Li Bingbing won in 2008 for The Knot.

Zhao Wei won in 2010 for Mulan.

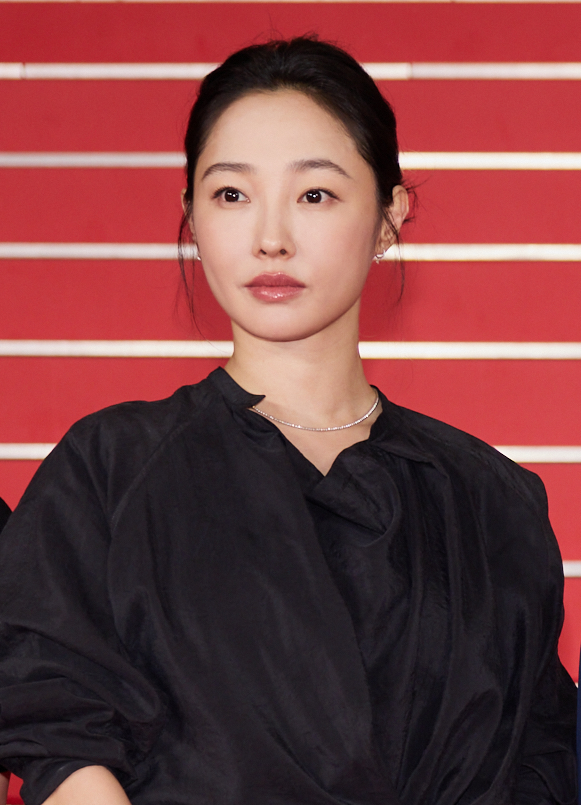
Bai Baihe won in 2012 for Love Is Not Blind.

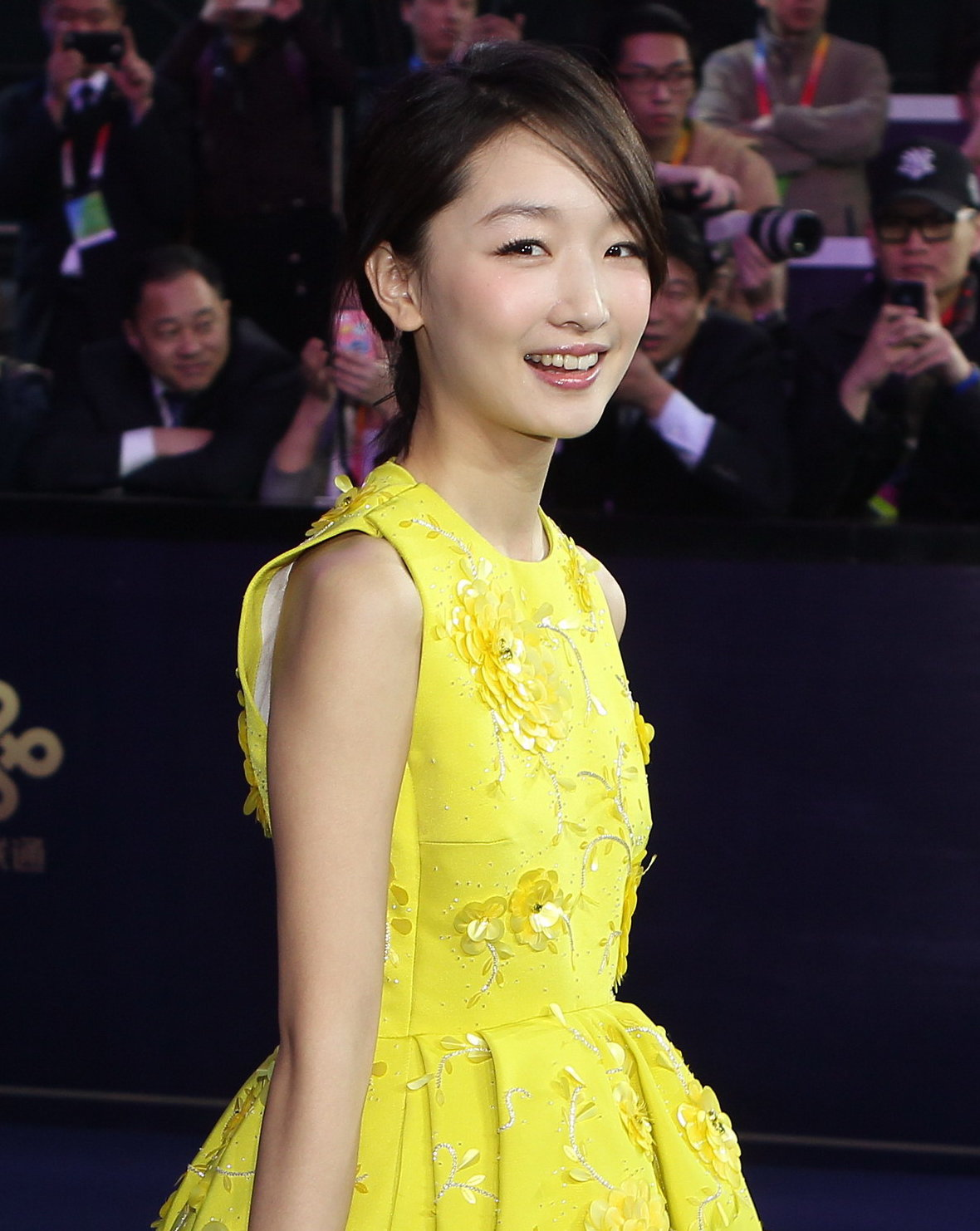
Zhou Dongyu won in 2020 for Better Days.

=== 1960s ===
Year	Actress	Film	Original title	Character	Ref.
1962	Zhu Xijuan	The Red Detachment of Women	红色娘子军	Wu Qionghua	
1963	Zhang Ruifang	Li Shuangshuang	李双双	Li Shuangshuang	

=== 1980s ===
Year	Actress	Film	Original title	Character	Ref.
1980	Joan Chen	Little Flower	小花	Xiaohua	
1981	Zhang Yu	Romance on Lushan Mountain	庐山恋	Zhou Jun	
1982	Li Xiuming	Xu Mao and His Daughters	许茂和他的女儿们	Si Guniang	
1983	Siqin Gaowa	Rickshaw Boy	骆驼祥子	Hu Niu	
1984	Gong Xue	Under the Bridge	大桥下面	Qin Nan	
1985	Wu Yufang	Life	人生	Liu Qiaozhen	
1986	Fang Shu	Sunrise	日出	Chen Bailu	
1987	Liu Xiaoqing	Hibiscus Town	芙蓉镇	Hu Yuyin	
1988	Liu Xiaoqing	A Wild Field	原野	Jinzi	
1989	Liu Xiaoqing	Chun Tao	春桃	Chuntao	

=== 1990s ===
Year	Actress	Film	Original title	Character	Ref.
1990	Song Jia	The Garden	庭院深深	Fang Siying	
1991	Song Jia	Mountain Wind	落山风	Subi	
1992	Zhao Lirong	The Spring Festival	过年	Mom	
1993	Gong Li	Raise the Red Lantern	大红灯笼高高挂	Songlian	
1994	Pan Hong	Shanghai Fever	股疯	Fan Li	
1995	Shen Danping	Liu cun cha kan	留村察看	Hong	
1996	Guo Keyu	Red Cherry	红樱桃	Chuchu	
1997	Ning Jing	Red River Valley	红河谷	Danzhu	
1998	Liu Bei	Dream Factory	甲方乙方	Zhou Beiyan	
1999	Xin Liu	Hong Niang	红娘		

=== 2000s ===
Year	Actress	Film	Original title	Character	Ref.
2000	Zhang Ziyi	The Road Home	我的父亲母亲	Zhao Di, Young	
2001	Gong Li	Breaking the Silence	漂亮妈妈	Sun Liying	
2002	Zhou Xun	A Pinwheel Without Wind	烟雨红颜	Zhao Ningjing	
2003	Xu Jinglei	Spring Subway	开往春天的地铁	Xiaohui	
2004	Fan Bingbing	Cell Phone	手机	Wu Yue	
2004	Xu Fan	Cell Phone	手机	Shen Xue	
2004	Zhao Wei	Warriors of Heaven and Earth	天地英雄	Wen Zhu	
2004	Zhang Yan	Warm Spring	暖春	Xiaohua	
2006	Rene Liu	A World Without Thieves	天下无贼	Wang Li	
2006	Zhang Yu	Ren Changxia	任长霞	Ren Changxia	
2006	Zhang Ziyi	House of Flying Daggers	十面埋伏	Xiaomei	
2006	Naren Hua	Between Life And Death	生死牛玉儒	Xie Li	
2008	Li Bingbing	The Knot	雲水謠	Wang Jindi	
2008	Vivian Hsu	The Knot	雲水謠	Wang Biyun	
2008	Tang Yan	Assembly	集結號	Sun Guiqin	
2008	Gao Yuanyuan	Rob-B-Hood	寶貝計劃	Shufen	
2008	Gigi Leung	The Secret of the Magic Gourd	宝葫芦的秘密	Ms. Liu	

=== 2010s ===
Year	Actress	Film	Original title	Character	Ref.
2010	Zhao Wei	Mulan	花木蘭	Hua Mulan	
2010	Zhou Xun	Painted Skin	畫皮	Xiaowei	
2010	Shu Qi	If You Are the One	非诚勿扰	Liang Xiaoxiao	
2010	Fan Bingbing	Bodyguards and Assassins	十月圍城	Yueru	
2010	Bai Jing	Iron Man	铁人	Guo Xiaomi	
2012	Bai Baihe	Love Is Not Blind	失恋33天	Huang Xiaoxian	
2012	Li Bingbing	1911	辛亥革命	Xu Zonghan	
2012	Sandra Ng	Echoes of the Rainbow	歲月神偷	Mrs. Law	
2012	Zhou Xun	Flying Swords of Dragon Gate	龍門飛甲	Ling Yanqiu	
2012	Xu Fan	Aftershock	唐山大地震	Li Yuanni	
2014	Zhang Ziyi	The Grandmaster	一代宗師	Gong Er	
2014	Yang Zishan	So Young	致我们终将逝去的青春	Zheng Wei	
2014	Yu Nan	Silent Witness	全民目击	Zhou Li	
2014	Tang Wei	Finding Mr. Right	北京遇上西雅图	Jiajia	
2014	Yao Xingtong	CZ 12	十二生肖	Coco	
2016	Xu Qing	Mr. Six	老炮儿	Hua Xiazi	
2016	Zhao Wei	Dearest	親愛的	Li Hongqin	
2016	Shu Qi	Mojin: The Lost Legend	鬼吹灯之寻龙诀	Shirley Yang	
2016	Bai Baihe	Monster Hunt	捉妖记	Huo Xiaolan	
2016	Yu Nan	Wolf Warrior	战狼	Long Xiaoyun	
2018	Chen Jin	Hold Your Hands	十八洞村	Ma Mei	
2018	Ma Sichun	Soul Mate	七月与安生	Qi Yue	
2018	Zhou Dongyu	Soul Mate	七月与安生	An Sheng	
2018	Li Qin	The Founding of an Army	建军大业	Yang Kaihui	
2018	Hai Qing	Operation Red Sea	紅海行動	Xia Nan	

=== 2020s ===
Year	Actress	Film(s)	Original title	Ref.
2020	Zhou Dongyu	Better Days	少年的你	
2020	Zhang Jingchu	Project Gutenberg	無雙	
2020	Zhang Ziyi	The Climbers	攀登者	
2020	Kara Wai	My People, My Country	我和我的祖国	
2020	Tan Zhuo	Sheep Without a Shepherd	误杀	
2022	Yuan Quan	Chinese Doctors	中国医生	
2022	Jia Ling	Hi, Mom	你好，李焕英	
2022	Zhang Xiaofei	Hi, Mom	你好，李焕英	
2022	Deng Jiajia	Be Somebody	扬名立万	
2022	Zhang Zifeng	Sister	我的姐姐	
2024	Ma Li	Article 20	第二十条	
2024	Ni Ni	Lost in the Stars	消失的她	
2024	Jia Ling	YOLO	热辣滚烫	
2024	Wang Zhi	The Wandering Earth 2	流浪地球2	
2024	Yin Tao	Home Coming	万里归途	
2026	Michelle Wai	The Last Dance	破·地獄	
2026	Song Jia	Her Story	好东西	
2026	Song Jia	Scare Out	惊蛰无声	
2026	Zhang Zifeng	The Volunteers: The Battle of Life and Death	志愿军：存亡之战	
2026	Zhang Zifeng	The Shadow's Edge	捕风追影	
2026	Gao Ye	Dead to Rights	南京照相馆	
2026	Ma Li	Successor	抓娃娃	
2026	Sabrina Zhuang	The Lychee Road	长安的荔枝	

== Records ==
Record	Actress	Record set
Most wins	Liu Xiaoqing	3 wins
Oldest winner	Zhao Lirong	Age 74; 1992
Youngest winner	Guo Keyu	Age 17; 1996
First Taiwanese actress to win	Rene Liu	—N/a
First Taiwanese actress to be nominated	Rene Liu	—N/a
First Hong Kong actress to win	Michelle Wai	—N/a
First Hong Kong actress to be nominated	Gigi Leung	—N/a
Won the Golden Rooster Award for Best Actress for the same role	Zhang Yu (for Romance on Lushan Mountain); Siqin Gaowa (for Rickshaw Boy); Gong Xue (for Under the Bridge); Li Xiuming (for Xu Mao and his daughters); Liu Xiaoqing (for Hibiscus Town); Pan Hong (for Shanghai Fever); Gong Li (for Breaking the Silence)	—N/a

== Multiple wins ==
Wins	Actress
3	Liu Xiaoqing
2	Gong Li
2	Song Jia
2	Zhang Ziyi

== See also ==
- Golden Rooster Award for Best Actress
- Huabiao Award for Outstanding Actress
