= 3rd Golden Rooster Awards =

1983 Chinese film awards ceremony

The 3rd Golden Rooster Award honoring the best in film of 1983, was given in Fuzhou, Fujian Province, May 27, 1983.

== Winners and nominees ==
Best Film	Best Director
At the Middle Age; Rickshaw Boy; My Memories of Old Beijing	Wu Yigong－My Memories of Old Beijing; Ling Zifeng－Rickshaw Boy; Teng Wenji－Country in Urban
Best Actor	Best Actress
N/A	Pan Hong－At the Middle Age; Siqin Gaowa－Rickshaw Boy
Best Supporting Actor	Best Supporting Actress
Niu Ben－The Herdsman; Zhi Yitong－Storm of Zijin Mountain	Zheng Zhenyao－My Memories of Old Beijing; Yin Xin－Rickshaw Boy
Best Writing	Best Stunt
N/A; 谌容－At the Middle Age	Princess Peacock－Zhang Erzan/Xing Peixiu/Jin Yanxi/Li Zaichun/Men Yufeng/Zhu Ge/Teng Fengchun
Best Chinese Opera Film	Best Documentary
N/A	N/A; 历史艳阳天; 光辉业绩
Best Animation	Best Popular Science Film
The Deer's Bell; 淘气的金丝猴	昆虫世界——身体构造与功能; 燕子; 徐薯18; 尼罗罗非鱼
Best Cinematography	Best Art Direction
Against the Light－Wei Duo; My Memories of Old Beijing－Cao Weiye	Rickshaw Boy－Yu Yiru
Best Music	Best Sound Recording
My Memories of Old Beijing－Lu Qiming; At the Middle Age－Wu Daming; Rickshaw Boy－Qu Xixian; Against the Light－Zhang Hong	N/A; 大泽龙蛇－Feng Deyao
Best Editing	
The Herdsman－Zhou Dingwen; My Memories of Old Beijing－Lan Wei Jie
