= 6th Hundred Flowers Awards =

Chinese film awards ceremony in 1983

The ceremony for the 6th Hundred Flowers Awards was held in 1983, Beijing.

== Awards ==
=== Best Film ===
Winner	Winning film	Nominees
N/A	At Middle Age; The Herdsman; Rickshaw Boy	N/A

=== Best Actor ===
Winner	Winning film	Nominees
Yan Shunkai	The True Story of Ah Q	N/A

=== Best Actress ===
Winner	Winning film	Nominees
Siqin Gaowa	Rickshaw Boy	N/A

=== Best Supporting Actor ===
Winner	Winning film	Nominees
Niu Ben	The Herdsman	N/A

=== Best Supporting Actress ===
Winner	Winning film	Nominees
Jiang Lili	Three-Dimensional People	N/A
