= Zhang Yu (actress) =

Chinese actress (born 1957)

- Born: 19 October 1957 (age 67); Shanghai, China
- Occupation: Actress
- Years active: 1977 – present
- Awards: Golden Rooster Awards – Best Actress; 1981 Romance on Lushan Mountain Hundred Flowers Awards – Best Actress; 1981 Romance on Lushan Mountain

Chinese name
- Traditional Chinese: 張瑜
- Simplified Chinese: 张瑜
Transcriptions

Zhang Yu (born 19 October 1957) is a Chinese actress. She is the first to win both the Golden Rooster Award and the Hundred Flowers Award for Best Actress, for Romance on Lushan Mountain. She was nominated for the Hundred Flowers Award for Best Actress and the Huabiao Award for Outstanding Actress for Ren Changxia (2005).

== Filmography ==
- Youth (1977)
- A! Yaolan (1979)
- Romance on Lushan Mountain (1980)
- Evening Rain (1980)
- Little Street (1981)
- Ren Changxia (2005)

== Awards and nominations ==
Year	Award	Category	Film	Result
1981	1st Golden Rooster Awards	Best Actress	Romance on Lushan Mountain; Evening Rain	Won
1981	4th Hundred Flowers Awards	Best Actress	Romance on Lushan Mountain	Won
1981	4th Hundred Flowers Awards	Best Actress	Evening Rain	Nominated
1982	2nd Golden Rooster Awards	Best Actress	Little Street	Nominated
1982	5th Hundred Flowers Awards	Best Actress	Little Street	Nominated
2005	11th Huabiao Awards	Outstanding Actress	Ren Changxia	Nominated
2006	28th Hundred Flowers Awards	Best Actress	Ren Changxia	Nominated
