= 2nd Hundred Flowers Awards =

Chinese film awards ceremony in 1963

Ceremony for the 2nd Hundred Flowers Awards was held in 1963, Beijing.

== Awards ==
=== Best Film ===
Winner	Winning film	Nominees
N/A	Li Shuangshuang	N/A

=== Best Director ===
Winner	Winning film	Nominees
Wang Ping	Locust Tree Village	N/A

=== Best Screenplay ===
Winner	Winning film	Nominees
Li Zhun	Li Shuangshuang	N/A

=== Best Actor ===
Winner	Winning film	Nominees
Zhang Liang	Brothers	N/A

=== Best Actress ===
Winner	Winning film	Nominees
Zhang Ruifang	Li Shuangshuang	N/A

=== Best Supporting Actor ===
Winner	Winning film	Nominees
Zhong Xinghuo	Li Shuangshuang	N/A

=== Best Animation ===
Winning film	Nominees
The Monkey King	N/A

=== Best Chinese Opera Film ===
Winning film	Nominees
Monkey Subdus the White-Bone Demon	N/A
