= A Love for Dilemma =

2021 Chinese television series

- Also known as: A Little Dilemma
- Original title: 小舍得
- Genre: Family, drama
- Based on: A Little Dilemma (小舍得) by Lu Yingong
- Screenplay by: Zhou Yifei
- Directed by: Zhang Xiaobo
- Starring: Song Jia; Tong Dawei; Jiang Xin; Li Jiahang; Zhang Guoli
- Country of origin: China
- Original language: Chinese
- No. of episodes: 42

Production
- Executive producer: Xu Xiaoou
- Producer: Xia Jie
- Production location: Shanghai
- Production companies: Linmon Pictures iQIYI (Beijing) Technology Co., Ltd.

Original release
- Network: CCTV-8; Dragon Television; IQIYI
- Release: April 11 – May 3, 2021

Related
- A Little Reunion; A Little Mood for Love

A Love for Dilemma (Chinese: 小舍得; pinyin: Xiǎo shědé, lit. A Little Dilemma) is a 2021 Chinese television series based on Lu Yingong's novel of the same name, directed by Zhang Xiaobo and starring Song Jia, Tong Dawei, Jiang Xin, Li Jiahang and Zhang Guoli. The series follows the story of the three-generation parent-child relationship and family education of the two families of Nan Li and Tian Yulan as clues. It airs on Dragon Television, CCTV-8 and IQIYI starting April 11, 2021.

== Plots ==
The story revolves around Nan Li (Xiao Song Jia), Xia Junshan (Tong Dawei) and their daughter Xia Huanhuan, son Xia Chaochao and Tian Yulan (Jiang Xin), Yan Peng (Li Jiahang) and son Yan Ziyou and other families. The children are about to move from primary school to junior high school. Every family is facing various changes. The parent-child relationship is also gaining new understanding through constant communication and choices. Parents and children will usher in the growth together.

== Cast ==
- Song Jia as Nan Li
  - Luan Xizi as Nan Li (young)
- Tong Dawei as Xia Junshan
- Jiang Xin as Tian Yulan
- Li Jiahang as Yan Peng
- Zhang Guoli as Nan Jianlong
- Wu Yue as Assistant Team Leader Li
- Wu Yufang as Cai Juying
- Zhu Yin as Aunt Zhao
- Liu Chutian as Xia Huanhuan
- Wu Ze Jinxi as Yan Ziyou
- Shan Yuhao as Xia Chaochao
- Li Yiqian as Mi Tao
- Jia Shunzhi as Mi Tao's father
- Liu Shan as Mi Tao's mother
- Zhang Tao as Teacher Zhong
- Li Henan as Zhang Xue'er
- Fu Chong as Father Yan
- Zhu Yaying as Mother Yan
- Zhou Dehua as Fang Yuanyang
- Wang Zijian as Manager Cui
- Wu Chao as Manager Wei
- Zhang Lu as CEO Fu Nuan
- Pu Shiyun as Lu Lu
- Bu Guanjin as Qi Qi
- Fan Shuaiqi as Fei Fei
- Li Xiaoyan as Mother Xia
- Liu Zhiyun as Lao Zhang
- Li Zhiqiang as Chief Lin
- Cao Yi as Vice Principal He
- Huang Xiaolin as Fei Xiaona
- Wang Shanshui as Chen Yong
- Lu Zhong as Principal Ya De
- Zheng Xiaowan as Teacher Lu
- Zhu Guoyu as Chief Wang
- Chen Qi as Architecturer
- Mei Nianjia as Tuo Ni
- Wang Xiaomi as Zhao Lin
- Zou Chenlei as Xu Yijia
- Xu Yutong as Girl
- He Qingyao as Man Man
- Yang Zijie as Wang Xian
- Mao Dou as Xiao Pang

== Ratings ==
- Highest ratings are marked in red, lowest ratings are marked in blue

Broadcast date	Dragon TV CSM63 ratings			CCTV-8 CSM63 ratings		
Broadcast date	Ratings (%)	Audience share (%)	Rank	Ratings (%)	Audience share (%)	Rank
2021.4.11	1.915	6.35	4	0.691	2.302	6
2021.4.12	2.162	7.4	4	0.559	1.933	9
2021.4.13	2.668	9.31	2	0.575	2.021	8
2021.4.14	2.905	10.27	1	0.542	2.144	7
2021.4.15	2.798	9.67	2	0.522	1.824	9
2021.4.16	2.71	9.31	1	0.530	1.832	7
2021.4.17	2.817	9.59	1	0.443	1.523	9
2021.4.18	3.003	10.07	2	0.568	1.922	8
2021.4.19	2.586	9.03	2	0.532	1.879	8
2021.4.20	2.614	9.17	2	0.528	1.874	9
2021.4.21	2.788	9.72	1	0.611	2.152	9
2021.4.22	2.538	8.88	1	0.619	2.182	7
2021.4.23	2.591	8.8	1	0.674	2.311	6
2021.4.24	2.452	8.34	2	0.711	2.441	6
2021.4.25	2.658	9.14	1	0.654	2.274	7
2021.4.26	2.933	10.28	2	0.629	2.223	8
2021.4.27	2.782	9.62	1	0.753	2.267	6
2021.4.28	2.736	9.54	1	0.732	2.572	7
2021.4.29	2.757	9.69	2	0.711	2.528	6
2021.4.30	2.774	9.83	1	0.667	2.382	7
2021.5.1	-	-	-	0.568	2.185	6
2021.5.2	2.994	10.77	1	0.701	2.527	6
2021.5.3	2.744	10.05	1	0.656	2.419	6
