= Memories of Peking: South Side Stories =

1960 novel by Lin Haiyin

Memories of Peking: South Side Stories (simplified Chinese: 城南旧事; traditional Chinese: 城南舊事; pinyin: Chéngnán Jiùshì) (also translated as My Memories of Old Beijing) is an autobiographical novel by Taiwanese author Lin Hai-yin, based on her own childhood experiences. Originally serialized in two parts in the December 1957 issues of Free China Journal, it was first published as a collection in 1960 by Taichung Kuangchi Publishing and became Lin's breakthrough work. The overarching theme of the novel is "farewell," and it is structured meticulously with progressive layers.

== Plot ==
Set in the 1920s in a courtyard in the southern part of Beijing, the novel depicts the warm family life of Ying-tzu and her family. The novel is imbued with a nostalgic tone, portraying the author's emotions in a simple and straightforward manner.

The narrative begins with the prologue "Winter Sun, Childhood Years, the Camel Caravan", and subsequent chapters each focus on one or two main characters. Through Ying-tzu's interactions with each character, the novel provides a child's perspective on the joys and sorrows of human life. The final chapter, "Papa’s Flowers Have Fallen, and I Was Not Longer a Child", marks the father's death, and Ying-tzu must begin to take on the responsibility of caring for her siblings, signaling the end of her childhood. The story concludes with a subtle sadness. Additionally, three major chapters in Memories of Peking: South Side Stories describe the stories of women: "Hui-an Hostel", Lan I-niang" (Aunt Lan), and "Donkey Rolls", depicting the unfortunate experiences of different women of that era.

Memories of Peking: South Side Stories was first published by Kuangchi Publishing in July 1960. After subsequent editions, Lin Hai-yin reclaimed the copyright and began self-publishing from the third edition, with her own Belles-Lettres Publishing handling the publication. The novel has seen multiple editions in Taiwan and Hong Kong, and it has been translated into English, Korean, German, Japanese, and other languages.

== See also ==
- My Memories of Old Beijing – a 1983 film adapted from the novel
