= Zhao Lirong =

Chinese actress

- Born: March 11, 1928; Baodi, Tianjin, China
- Died: July 17, 2000 (aged 72); Beijing, China
- Occupation: Actress
- Years active: 1955–2000
- Awards: Hundred Flowers Awards – Best Actress; 1992 Spring Festival

Chinese name
- Traditional Chinese: 趙麗蓉
- Simplified Chinese: 赵丽蓉
Transcriptions
- Musical career
- Also known as: Lirong Zhao
- Instrument: Vocals

Zhao Lirong
- Traditional Chinese: 趙麗蓉
- Simplified Chinese: 赵丽蓉
Transcriptions
Standard Mandarin
- Hanyu Pinyin: Zhào Lìróng

Zhao Lirong (March 11, 1928 – July 17, 2000) was a Chinese singer and film actress.

== Biography ==
Before she became involved in the film industry, Zhao Lirong was a famous Pingju supporting actress on the stage. From the 1980s, Zhao started her comedy performances in the CCTV Spring Festival Gala. In 1990, she received the award for Best Actress at the Tokyo International Film Festival and Hundred Flowers Awards for her first leading role in The Spring Festival. After this, Zhao continued her comedy career with CCTV. On July 17, 2000, Zhao Lirong died from cancer. As one of China's most beloved comedy actresses, thousands attended her funeral.

== Filmography ==
- Third Sister Yang Goes to Court (1981)
- Monkey King (西游记) (1986) (TV) Queen of Chechi States
- Dream of the Red Mansion Part 3 (红楼梦第三部) (1988) Granny Liu
- The Spring Festival (过年) (1991) Mother
- Erxiao's Mother/Filial Son and Filial Piety (孝子贤孙伺候着) (1993) Mother

== Awards and nominations ==
Year	Award	Category	Nominated work	Result	Ref.
1991	Tokyo International Film Festival	Best Actress	The Spring Festival	Won	
1992	Golden Rooster Awards	Best Actress	The Spring Festival	Nominated	
1992	Hundred Flowers Awards	Best Actress	The Spring Festival	Won	
1993	Golden Phoenix Awards	Female Actor	The Spring Festival	Won	
