= The Spring Festival =

1991 film

- Film poster
- Directed by: Huang Jianzhong
- Written by: Yi Jiang
- Starring: Li Baotian
- Production company: Beijing Film Studio
- Release date: 1991
- Running time: 90 minutes
- Country: China
- Language: Mandarin

The Spring Festival (Chinese: 过年) is a 1991 Chinese drama film directed by Huang Jianzhong. The film was selected as the Chinese entry for the Best Foreign Language Film at the 64th Academy Awards, but was not accepted as a nominee.

== Cast ==
- Li Baotian as Father
- Zhao Lirong as Mother
- Ding Jiali as Sister-in-law
- Ge You as Son-in-law

== Awards and nominations ==
Year	Award	Category	Recipient	Result	Ref.
1991	Tokyo International Film Festival	Special Jury Prize	The Spring Festival	Won	
1991	Tokyo International Film Festival	Best Actress	Zhao Lirong	Won	
1992	Hundred Flowers Awards	Best Picture	The Spring Festival	Won	
1992	Hundred Flowers Awards	Best Actress	Zhao Lirong	Won	
1992	Hundred Flowers Awards	Best Supporting Actor	Ge You	Won	
1992	12th Golden Rooster Awards	Best Actress	Zhao Lirong	Nominated	
1992	12th Golden Rooster Awards	Best Supporting Actress	Ding Jiali	Won	
1992	2nd Shanghai Film Critics Awards	Ten Best Pictures	The Spring Festival	Won	

== See also ==
- List of submissions to the 64th Academy Awards for Best Foreign Language Film
- List of Chinese submissions for the Academy Award for Best Foreign Language Film
