= My Memories of Old Beijing =

- Film poster
- Directed by: Wu Yigong
- Screenplay by: Yi Ming
- Based on: Memories of Peking: South Side Stories by Lin Haiyin
- Starring: Shen Jie; Zhang Min; Zheng Zhenyao; Zhang Fengyi; Yan Xiang
- Cinematography: Cao Weiye
- Edited by: Lan Weijie
- Music by: Xie Guojie
- Production company: Shanghai Film Studio
- Release date: 1983
- Running time: 96 minutes
- Country: China
- Language: Mandarin

My Memories of Old Beijing (simplified Chinese: 城南旧事; traditional Chinese: 城南舊事; pinyin: Chéng nán Jiùshì) is a 1983 Chinese drama film directed by Wu Yigong, based on the novel of the same name written by Lin Haiyin, first published in 1960. Winner of the 3rd Golden Rooster Awards for Best Director, Best Music and Best Supporting Actress in 1983, the film was selected as China's entry for the Best Foreign Language Film at the 56th Academy Awards, but was not accepted as a nominee.

== Plot ==
In the late 1920s, a six-year-old girl named Lin Yingzi (Shen Jie) lives on a hutong in the south of Beijing with her family – her father, her mother and her nurse.

Her first friend is a mad woman Xiuzhen who is always standing at the hutong entrance waiting for her missing daughter Little Guizi. Xiuzhen fell in love with a young man in college years ago. However, the young man was arrested before she gave birth to their daughter, who was later abandoned by her family. Yingzi shows great sympathy for Xiuzhen. It turns out that Yingzi's friend Niu happened to be the daughter of Xiuzhen. Xiuzhen is so excited that she cannot wait to take her daughter to her father, the former student whose fate is unknown. The two then run off in the pouring rain to find the father, but they both die after being hit by a train.

Yingzi and her family then move to another hutong. She befriends a young man with thick lips who becomes a thief to support his little brother's schooling. Yingzi thinks the young man is kind but is unsure if he is a good guy. He is later arrested by the police, which made Yingzi quite sad.

When Yingzi is nine, the husband of her nurse comes for his wife. According to him, his son has died and his daughter was sold away two years ago. Yingzi becomes very sad and cannot understand why her nurse goes out to earn money instead of taking care of her own kids at home.

Finally, Yingzi's dad dies of tuberculosis. After his death, Yingzi leaves Beijing with her mother and baby brother and bids farewell to all the memories of her childhood.

== Cast ==
- Shen Jie
- Zhang Min
- Zheng Zhenyao
- Zhang Fengyi
- Yan Xiang

== Reception ==
The film is little watched and distributed in the West; however, Time Out magazine praised the film, calling it "impressionistic, anecdotal and resonant", the result being "an immensely accessible and often tender film, sometimes betrayed by its visual and stylistic ambition but nonetheless consistently evocative, and full of a diffuse, affecting melancholy."

== See also ==
- List of submissions to the 56th Academy Awards for Best Foreign Language Film
- List of Chinese submissions for the Academy Award for Best Foreign Language Film
