= All-China Resistance Association of Writers and Artists =

The All-China Resistance Association of Writers and Artists, also rendered in English as the National Resistance Association of Literary and Art Workers (simplified Chinese: 中华全国文艺界抗敌协会; traditional Chinese: 中華全國文藝界抗敵協會; pinyin: Zhōnghuá quánguó wényìjiè kàngdí xiéhuì) was an organization founded on 27 March 1938 to unite cultural workers in China against the Japanese invaders during the Second Sino-Japanese War. It was led by the politically neutral writer Lao She and membership ranged from 100 to 400 writers during the years of the organization's existence. Notable members included Mao Dun, Ding Ling, Ba Jin, Lin Yutang, Shi Zhecun, Xu Dishan, and many others.

During the Second Sino-Japanese War, intellectuals sought to use culture to increase the public consciousness and spirit of resistance against the invading Japanese forces. In March 1938, the All-China Resistance Association of Writers and Artists was established in Hankou. Its slogan was "Literature must go to the countryside! Literature must join the army!"

== See also ==
- John Reed Clubs
- Proletkult
- China Federation of Literary and Art Circles
- League of Left-Wing Writers
