= Lu Xiaoya =

Chinese director (born 1941)

Lu Xiaoya (simplified Chinese: 陆小雅; traditional Chinese: 陸小雅; pinyin: Lù Xiǎoyǎ; born 1941) is an actor, scriptwriter, and movie director that belonged to the so-called fourth generation of Chinese filmmakers.

Born in Changsha, Hunan. Lu traces her ancestry to Wugang, Hunan. She directed The Girl in Red as executive director, which was awarded the Golden Rooster Award for Best Picture during 5th Golden Rooster Awards in 1985, the 8th Hundred Flowers Awards for Best Film, and the Huabiao Awards for Outstanding Film First Prize in 1984.
