= Li Zhun =

Chinese novelist

- 李准
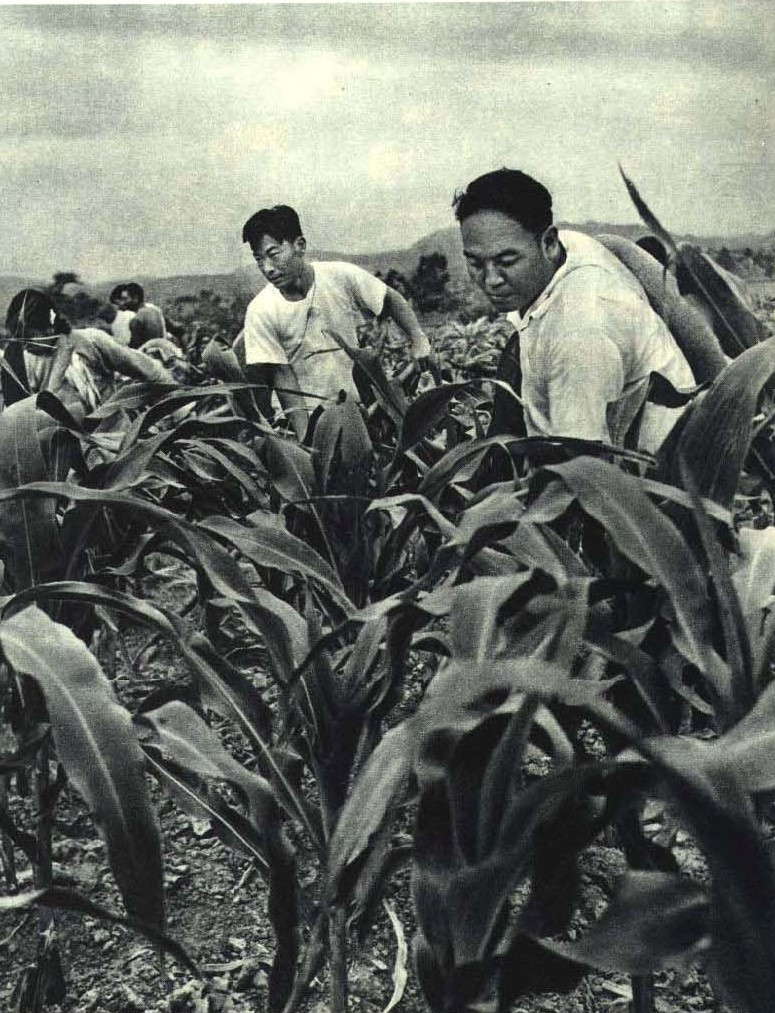
- Li Zhun in 1963
- Born: Li Tiesheng (李铁生); July 4, 1928; Luoyang, Henan, China
- Died: February 2, 2000 (aged 71); Beijing, China
- Education: Dade High School
- Occupation: Novelist
- Relatives: Li Mingxuan (father)
- Writing career
- Language: Chinese, Mongolian
- Period: 1953–2000
- Genres: Novel, screenplay
- Notable work: The Yellow River Flows to the East
- Notable awards: 2nd Hundred Flowers Awards; 1963 Li Shuangshuang; National Excellent Short Story Award; 5th Golden Rooster Award for Best Writing; 1981 Wang Jieshi; 2nd Mao Dun Literature Prize; 1985 The Yellow River Flows to the East

Li Zhun (Chinese: 李准; pinyin: Lǐ Zhún; 4 July 1928 – 2 February 2000) was a Chinese novelist who was the vice president of China Writers Association and the librarian of Chinese Modern Literature Museum.

== Biography ==
Li was born into an ethnic Mongolian family of teachers in Luoyang, Henan in 1928. His grandfather, Li Zulian (李祖莲), his uncles, Li Mingzhao (李明昭) and Li Mingshan (李明善), all were teachers. His father, Li Mingxuan (李明选), was a businessman. His mother came from a family of doctors.

In 1934, Li studied at Matun school (麻屯小学), by age 6. Then he attended Dade High School (德达高中), a high school in Changdai Town, Luoyang County (洛阳县常袋镇).

In 1942, Li fled from famine to Xi'an, Shaanxi.

At the age of 15, Li was an apprentice in a store. Li worked as a postman in Matun Post Office (麻屯镇邮政所) by age 17. Two years later, Li studied Chinese opera in Matun Theatre Troupe (麻屯戏剧团).

In 1948, Li worked in Zhongzhou Bank (中州银行), then he was transferred to Luoyang to teach Chinese.

Li started to publish works in 1953. Li was transferred from Luoyang to Zhengzhou in 1954. In 1955, Li served as a delegate to the National People's Congress.

Li joined the Chinese Communist Party at the age of 32, at the same time, he was appointed the director of China Writers Association.

In 1964, Li served as a delegate to the National People's Congress and a Standing Committee member of the All-China Youth Federation.

In 1966, Mao Zedong launched the Cultural Revolution, he was labeled a "Rightist", he suffered political persecution and experienced mistreatment, then he was sent to Zhoukou to work. Li was rehabilitated by Deng Xiaoping in 1980.

In 1981, Li moved to Beijing. He was appointed the librarian of Chinese Modern Literature Museum in 1990 and the vice president of China Writers Association in 1996.

In 2000, Li died in Beijing.

== Works ==
=== Novel ===
- The Yellow River Flows to the East (黄河东流去)

=== Screenplay ===
- Li Shuangshuang (李双双)
- Wang Jieshi (王结实)
- The Biography of the Old Soldier (老兵新传)
- The Great River Flows On (大河奔流)
- The Herdsman (牧马人)
- The Qingliang Temple (清凉寺的钟声)
- The Old Man and the Dog (老人与狗)

== Awards ==
- Li Shuangshuang – 2nd Hundred Flowers Awards (1963)
- Wang Jieshi – National Excellent Short Story Award and 5th Golden Rooster Award for Best Writing (1981)
- The Yellow River Flows to the East – 2nd Mao Dun Literature Prize
