= Lin Haiyin =

Taiwanese writer

- 林海音
- Born: 18 March 1918; Osaka, Japan
- Died: 1 December 2001 (aged 83); Taipei, Taiwan
- Education: News and Broadcast Institute
- Occupation: Writer

Lin Haiyin (Chinese: 林海音; pinyin: Lín Hǎiyīn; born Lin Hanying; 18 March 1918 – 1 December 2001), also named Amy Lin, was a Taiwanese writer and editor. Of Miaoli Hakka descent, She was born in Osaka, Japan, and lived in Itahashi Town (板橋街), Taihoku Prefecture until the age of four before relocating to Peking, China. Lin worked as a journalist and editor for the World Journal (世界日報) in Peking before moving back to Taiwan with her family in 1948. In Taiwan, she served as an editor for the Mandarin Daily News (國語日報) and as the editor of the United Daily News (聯合報) supplement. She is best known for her 1960 book Memories of Peking: South Side Stories (城南舊事), a novelistic tribute to her childhood reminiscences of Peking.

== Early life and education ==
Lin was born in Osaka, Japan, where her father (of Toufen, Miaoli County origin) worked as a merchant. Lin's parents moved back to Taiwan briefly, then settling in Beijing when she was five. She spent her next 25 years there. In Beijing, Lin graduated from the News and Broadcast Institute and became a journalist for Shijie Ribao ("World News Daily").

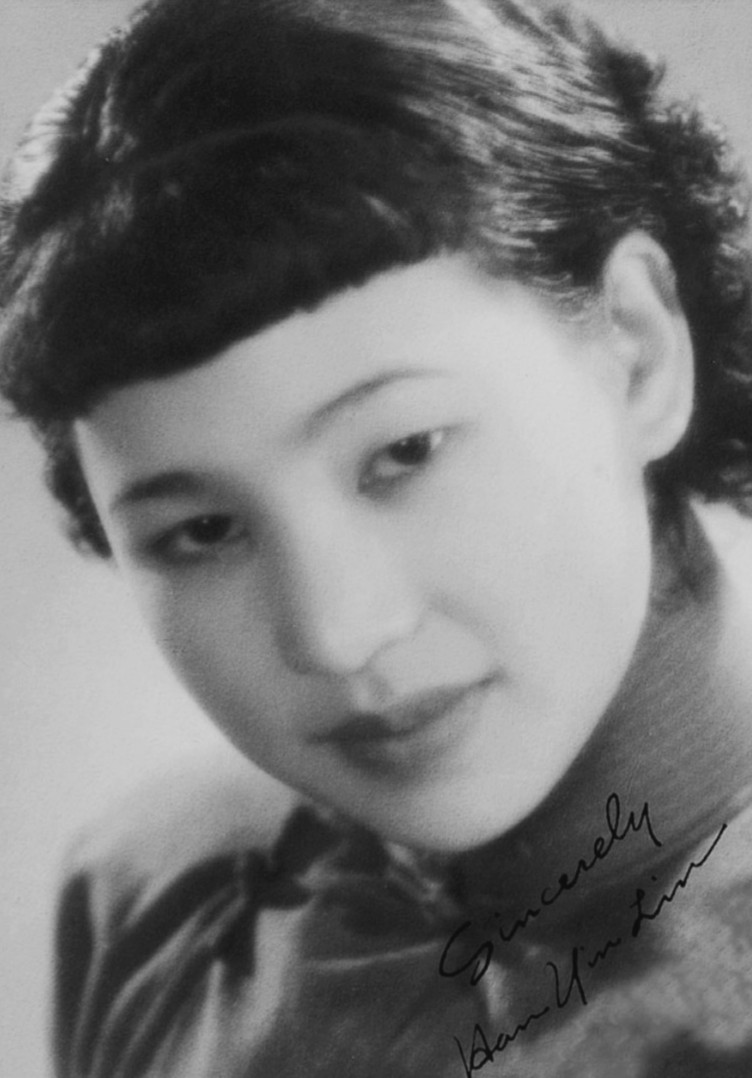
Lin Haiyin in 1935

In 1948, Lin moved with her husband and family to Taiwan, where she became the editor of several important literary periodicals and newspapers, including the literary section of the United Daily News and The Literary Monthly, before eventually establishing her own publishing house. She would reside in Taiwan for the rest of her life.

Altogether, she published some 18 books, including novels, short story collections, radio drama and children's literature, many of which deal with the feminine experience. Her most famous book is Memories of Peking: South Side Stories (1960). In it, Lin records in lively, evocative, first-person prose her childhood memories, ending with the death of her father, from the eyes of a precocious, impressionable young girl.

In 1967, Lin Hai-yin founded the literary magazine Belles-Lettres Monthly (純文學) and founded the Belles-Lettres Publishing House the following year, considered Taiwan's first professional literary publishing house. For several decades, Lin and her writer husband, Hsia Cheng-ying (夏承楹, pen name He Fan [何凡]), engaged in the threefold work of editing, writing, and publishing, contributing significantly to the promotion of modern Taiwanese literature.

== Career ==
Lin Haiyin is best known for her novel Memories of Peking: South Side Stories (城南舊事). Her literary works encompass a wide range, including novels, essays, broadcasts, children's literature, essays, and literary criticism. Her protagonists often reflect the characters from the feudal old times she observed, especially women, and her stories, while often poignant, vividly portray the reality of society and the complexity of human nature.

Lin Haiyin played a crucial role in discovering and encouraging talented writers. Many authors, including Chi Teng Sheng (七等生) with "Unemployment, Poker, Fried Squid" (失業、撲克、炸魷魚), Cheng Ching-Wen (鄭清文) with "Lonely Heart" (寂寞的心), Huang Chun-ming (黃春明) with "Getting Off at Chengtzu" (城仔下車), and Lin Hwai-min (林懷民) with "Children's Song" (兒歌), published their first works under her editorship at the United Daily News supplement. Lin Haiyin also encouraged Taiwanese writers who had stopped writing for many years, such as those who wrote in both Japanese rule and post-war eras, to resume their work. Notable figures she supported include Chung Li-ho (鍾理和), Chung Chao-cheng (鍾肇政), Liao Ching-hsiu (廖清秀), Chen Huo-chuan (陳火泉), Shih Tsui-feng (施翠峰), and others. She patiently helped them revise texts that were not smooth due to language differences before publishing them.

== Film adaptation ==
In 1982, mainland Chinese director Wu Yigong made the film My Memories of Old Beijing based on her novel. The film won the Best Director Prize at the 3rd annual Golden Rooster Awards, as well as the Golden Eagle Prize (Best Feature Film) at the Manila International Film Festival in 1983. In 1999, it was chosen as one of the 100 best 20th-century Chinese-language films by Asia Weekly.

== Bibliography ==
Bibliography of Lin Haiyin's works available in English:

- "Buried With the Dead." Tr. Jane Parish Yang. The Chinese Pen (Winter, 1980): 33–61.
- "Candle." In Nieh Hua-ling, ed. and trans., Eight Stories By Chinese Women. Taipei: Heritage Press, 1962, 53–68. Also in Ann C. Carver and Sung-sheng Yvonne Chang, eds., Bamboo Shoots After the Rain: Contemporary Stories by Women Writers of Taiwan. NY: The Feminist Press, 1990, 17–25.
- "The Desk." Tr. Nancy Zi Chiang. The Chinese Pen (Winter, 1972): 13–19.
- "Donkey Rolls." Tr. David Steelman. The Chinese Pen, (Autumn, 1979): 18–39.
- "Gold Carp's Pleated Skirt." Tr. Hsiao Lien-ren. In Chi Pang-yuan, et al., eds., An Anthology of Contemporary Chinese Literature. Taipei: National Institute for Compilation and Translation, 1975, II, 9–23.
- Green Seaweed and Salted Eggs. Tr. Nancy C. Ing. Taipei: The Heritage Press, 1963.
- "Let Us Go and See the Sea." Tr. Nancy Chang Ing. The Chinese Pen, (Spring, 1973): 32–66. Republished in Chinese Women Writers' Association, eds., The Muse of China: A Collection of Prose and Short Stories. Taipei: Chinese Women Writers' Association, 1974, 61–94. Also in Green Seaweed and Salted Eggs.
- "Lunar New Year's Feast." Tr. Hsin-sheng C. Kao. In Joseph S.M. Lau, ed., The Unbroken Chain: An Anthology of Taiwan Fiction Since 1926. Bloomington: IUP, 1983, 68–73.
- My Memories of Old Beijing. Tr. Nancy Ing and Chi Pang-yuan. HK: Chinese University Press, 1992. Excerpted as "Memories of Old Peking: Huian Court." Tr. Cathy Poon. Renditions, 27–28 (1987): 19–48.

== Portrait ==
- Lin Haiyin. A Portrait by Kong Kai Ming at Portrait Gallery of Chinese Writers (Hong Kong Baptist University Library).
