= Zhang Ruifang =

Chinese actress (1918–2012)

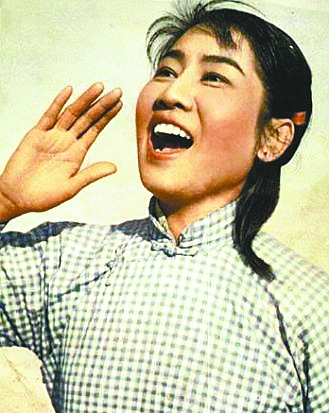
- Zhang in 1962
- Born: 15 June 1918; Baoding, Hebei, China
- Died: 28 June 2012 (aged 94); Shanghai, China
- Occupation: Actress
- Years active: 1936 – 1982
- Awards: Golden Phoenix Awards; 1993 Honorary Award; 2003 Lifetime Achievement AwardGolden Rooster Awards – 2007 Lifetime Achievement Award Hundred Flowers Awards – Best Actress; 1963 Li Shuangshuang

Chinese name
- Traditional Chinese: 張瑞芳
- Simplified Chinese: 张瑞芳
Transcriptions

Zhang Ruifang (15 June 1918 – 28 June 2012) was a Chinese film and theatre actress. She was a political activist. She used her work to resist the Japanese invasion and she was a prisoner for a year during the cultural revolution. The China Film Association gave her a lifetime achievement award.

== Life ==
Zhang was born on 15 June 1918 in Baoding in Hebei Province. She studied painting in the Western style at Beiping's National Arts School. She completed the course in 1935. After joining the Communist Party in 1937 she joined the Chinese Drama Society and after she completed her course in 1936 she was employed on the stage.

During the war with Japan she performed to support the national effort to resist the Japanese invasion. During the war she took the lead in her first film. The director Sun Yu cast her as a double agent in the film Baptism of Fire. By 1943 she was married for the second time to Jin Shan who served as a spy for the communist party. Her next role was not until after the war in 1946 when her performance in On Songhua River was well received. Zhang modelled her acting persona on her role model Ingrid Bergman.

In 1963, Zhang won Hundred Flowers Award for Best Actress for her household character in comedy Li Shuangshuang. She is considered to be of the "four great drama actresses" in China (四大名旦), along with Bai Yang, Shu Xiuwen and Qin Yi. Zhang's portrayal and the film were praised by the premier Zhou Enlai. Zhang played a character who took an equal role to the men in the story. She completed ten more films before she retired from acting in 1982.

After she retired she took an interest in politics. She served on the National Committees of the Chinese People's Political Consultative Conference three times. She was also on national committees for women and another for art and literature.

During the Cultural Revolution, Zhang was imprisoned for a year, but she suffered less than some of her contemporaries as some spent six years in captivity.

== Later years and death ==
Zhang rejected capitalism when she started a retirement home in 2000 in Changning in Shanghai. She explained that her purpose was to create a community for 40 people and not to make a profit.

In 2007, she was again honoured at the Golden Rooster Awards when she was given a lifetime achievement award by the China Film Association.

Zhang died in Shanghai in 2012.

== Filmography ==
Year	English Title	Chinese Title	Role	Notes
1940	Baptism of Fire	火的洗礼	Fang Yin	
1947	On the Songhua River	松花江上	Niuer	
1952	Civil war	南征北战	Zhao Yumin	
1956	Mother	母亲	Mother	
1957	The Song of Phoenix	凤凰之歌	Jin Feng	
1958	By The River	三八河边	Chen Shuzhen	
1959	Nie Er	聂耳	Zheng Leidian	
1959	Always Colorful Spring	万紫千红总是春	Wang Caifeng	
1962	Li Shuangshuang	李双双	Li Shuangshuang	Hundred Flowers Award for Best Actress
1964	Li Shanzi	李善子	Li Shanzi	Banned during the Cultural Revolution
1979	Streaming	大河奔流	Li Mai	
1979	Roar! The Yellow River	怒吼吧！黄河	A Dan	
1982	Fountain Jingling	泉水叮咚	Grandma Tao	
