= Chun Tao =

- Simplified Chinese: 春桃
- Hanyu Pinyin: Chun Tao
- Directed by: Ling Zifeng
- Written by: Han Lanfang
- Based on: Chun Tao by Xu Dishan
- Produced by: Du Taiying; Li Dongde
- Starring: Jiang Wen; Liu Xiaoqing; Cao Qianming; Feng Hanyuan
- Cinematography: Liang Ziyong
- Edited by: Zhou Tingmei; Zhang Min
- Music by: Qi Xixian
- Release date: 1988
- Running time: 93 minutes
- Country: China
- Language: Mandarin

Chun Tao is a feature film jointly produced by Nanhai Film Company and Liaoning Film Studio, directed by Ling Zifeng. Released in mainland China in 1988. The film was adapted from Xu Dishan's Chun Tao. After telling that Chuntao and Li Mao were scattered by the bandits on the wedding night, she went to Beijing to scavenge the wasteland and lived with Liu Xianggao. The emotional story of her life with two men after Li Mao's accidental disability.

== Synopsis ==
The story took place in old Beijing in the 1930s. Chun Tao and her fiancé were scattered by the bandits when they got married. They fled the countryside alone to Beijing. In the flight, Chuntao and Liu Xianggao met and lived together. Neighbors want them to get married. One day, Chuntao passed the small town next to Shichahai and heard someone call her nickname. She saw a man without legs. It turns out that this is Li Mao, her fiancé. She couldn't bear to see Li Mao staring to take him home on the streets. Three people slept on a bed, and the three tried to restrain themselves and tried to accept this unacceptable reality. But no matter how the spring peach stubbornly insists that "all three of us will live like this", both men hope that Chuntao has a choice. Liu Xianggao finally left, Chuntao realized that she loved him and ran out to find him. When she returned home with disappointment, she found that Li Mao was hanging. Chuntao saved Li Mao. Since then, Chuntao and Li Mao have become brothers and sisters. Soon, Liu Xianggao was driven by love and conscience and returned to Chuntao. Li Mao is happy with their reunion.

== Story Background ==
In the city of old Beijing, there was a singing voice from time to time: "In exchange for the lights, change the lights." The owner of the voice, wearing old cloth clothes and wearing a straw hat, her body is pressed against her petite body and can only walk like a camel.

She walks through the streets of Beijing every day. She is a scavenger. In the movie, Chuntao and Liu Xianggao depend on selling the paper for a living. Li Mao and Chuntao were the couples who were about to get married. The two were separated in exile. Li boy went to be a soldier. The Japanese devils, lost there legs in the war. The film "Spring Peach" was born in the 1980s and is in a difficult period of historical change. When the old concept collapsed, the director showed gender equality in the film. If we follow the common understanding, such a relationship between men and women. The triangular structure is ultimately chosen by the woman who she belongs to. Even though women have the right to choose in this love structure, this right is just a multiple choice question. But Chuntao is different. Everyone in this family needs to go out to make a living. Chuntao has the initiative. In the movie, Chuntao did not express his mind. There are few descriptions of her love activities. The story describes the gratitude, tolerance and redemption of Chuntao.

Although the director did not describe the psychological activities of Chuntao, he used the lens language to present the emotions of Chuntao on the screen. There is a bold shot in the movie, which is the base bath. Chuntao shows the youngest female body at the best age in a semi-naked way. It is a breakthrough description in the movies of the 1980s. In the past Chinese movies, Although films are depicting such a strong and determined female image, they are often shaped like men, and they are "women without gender". But in Chun Tao, Chuntao showed a strong side; she is also beautiful, loves clean, and is a real woman.

For women at the bottom of China, such as Chuntao, the way of love is not essential; it is imperative that they are together. The best way she can think of attachment is to run this small house with Liu Xianggao and Li Mao, set Up a small stall, or move to a bigger house. Chuntao understands that these two men have feelings for her, but for her, no matter what choices they made, they have to continue to live.

== Social condition ==
Actors: After the close cooperation in Hibiscus Town in 1986, Liu Xiaoqing and Jiang Wen once again played the couple. However, with the mutual adapting in last time, this pair of "couples" obviously play more naturally and openly to each other. It can be seen from the almost naked bathing filming of Liu Xiaoqing shortly after the opening of the film. For the understanding of the characters, the two performed excellently. Notably, Liu Xiaoqing perfectly demonstrated the kind, stubborn, affectionate, and loyal personalities of Chuntao. It is commendable that the role of Chuntao in the film is no longer the kind of past female image as relying on males for everything, but a female with a strong sense of independence and personality.

Theme: For the director Ling Zifeng, the intention is not only to tell such an unreasonable and deformed family story to entertain the public. Instead, he wants to explore the inner cultural proposition of the film. In the 1980s of China, reform and opening up change the social system and poses a vast and profound influence on the Chinese people. With the development of the market economy, while people enjoy the benefits of the economy, traditional values are no longer feasible. Just like Chuntao in the film, people are facing a painful and challenging choice of significances.

On the one hand, the ex-husband who is about to marry– representing the custom, tradition; On the other, the man who she lives with for three years in a romantic relationship – embodying love, modernity. The choice of Chuntao has transcended the simple choice between the two men, but the choice between custom and love, tradition, and modernity. This choice is undoubtedly painful, but inescapable for the protagonist as the two cannot coexist.

The pain of Chuntao in her choice was the same as the pain of the Chinese people in the 1980s when they faced the transformation of modern society. While people would like to enjoy the pleasure and excitement brought by the opening of the market, they tried their best to recover the gradually collapsed traditional values. It was in this contradiction and entanglement that people's thoughts naturally happened to be with fluctuations and struggles.

Especially at the end of the film, when Chuntao walks out of the door, on one side stands the ex-husband and the other Jiang Wen. This kind of contradiction is precisely the contradiction between traditional values and modern values.

It shows Chinese society at that time.

== Cast ==
- Jiang Wen – Liu Xianggao
- Liu Xiaoqing – Chun Tao
- Cao Qianming – Li Mao
- Feng Han Yuan – Police
- Yao Weiping – Fool
- Wang Xinli – Xiu zi
- Niu Rongliang – Mr.Wu
- Sun Yuzhen – Mrs.Wu

== Awards and nominations ==
Awards
Award	Category	Name	Outcome
12th Hundred Flowers Awards
12th Hundred Flowers Awards	Best feature film		Won
12th Hundred Flowers Awards	Best Actress	Liu Xiaoqing	Won
12th Hundred Flowers Awards	Best Actor	Jiang Wen	Won
