= Wu Yufang =

Chinese actress (born 1963)

- Born: January 13, 1963 (age 63); Shanghai, China
- Occupation: Actress

Chinese name
- Simplified Chinese: 吴玉芳
Transcriptions

Wu Yufang (Chinese: 吴玉芳) is a Chinese actress. She is best known for her roles in film and television, including Send Me to the Clouds (2019) and Life (1984). Her roles in television include A Love for Dilemma (2021), Loving, Never Forgetting (2014), and The Ordinary Road (2023).

== Early life ==
Wu was born on 13 January 1963 in Shanghai, China.

== Career ==
Wu's breakout role was as Liu Qiao-zhen in Wu Tianming's 1984 film Life. Her performance was praised by the Los Angeles Times, stating in their review that "Wu Yufang has the radiantly innocent courage of Olivia De Havilland’s Melanie in Gone With the Wind." The film was selected as the Chinese entry for the Best Foreign Language Film at the 57th Academy Awards. While the film was not nomimated, Wu won China's Hundred Flowers Award for Best Actress in 1985 for her work in the film.

Wu Yufang won a Golden Rooster Award for Best Supporting Actress in 2019 for her role as Liang Meizhi in Teng Congcong's film Send Me to the Clouds.

== Filmography ==
=== Film ===
Year	Title	Role	Notes	Ref.
1984	Life	Liu Qiao-zhen		
2003	Drunken Fist	Liang Mingzhu		
2005	Curse of Lola	Troupe Director		
2009	Turning Point 1977	Wei Li		
2009	Dwelling Narrowness	Xu Li		
2013	Playing with Fire	Ge Jianhao		
2013	Pearl	Chen Yu		
2017	Battle of Memories	Jiang's mother		
2019	Send Me to the Clouds	Liang Meizhi		
2021	Tomorrow Will Be Fine	Xiao Yu's mother		
2022	Monsters	Cast		
2022	In Search of Lost Time	Kang (All-China Women’s Federation chairwoman)		
2022	She and Her Perfect Husband	Yang Hua's mother		
2022	I Love You	Li Xiaodong's mother		
2024	I Miss You	Bai Xiaoyu's mother		
2024	The Tale of Rose	Wu Yuejiang		
2024	Enjoy Yourself	Cast		
2025	Double Happiness	Yan Li		

=== Television ===
Year	Title	Role	Notes	Ref.
2014	Loving, Never Forgetting	Li Zhining		
2015	Hey, Daddy!	Li Xiaohua		
2016	Love O2O	Bei Weiwei's mother		
2019	Royal Nirvana	Mrs. Lu		
2019	Eighteen Springs	Cast		
2020	My Best Friend's Story	Mrs. Jiang		
2021	A Love for Dilemma	Cai Juying		
2022	Modern Marriage	Mrs. Cao		
2022	Thank You Doctor	Aunt Li		
2022	Women Walk The Line	Cast		
2022	In Our Prime	Li's Mother		
2023	Gui Lu	Gong Lin		
2023	Thirteen Years of Dust	Yang Man's mother		
2023	Start Here	Fang Yuanjian's mother		
2023	The Ordinary Road	Lao Yuxue		
2023	Be Your Own Light	He Huan's mother		
2023	Who's Your Daddy?	Cast		
2024	Born to Be the One	Cast		
2024	Family	Liu Mei Qin		
2025	Fight for Beauty	Cast		
2025	A Better Life	Cast		
2025	Created in China	Fu Qiufang		
2026	Hold a Court Now	Xie Zhuoyuan		
2026	The Epoch of Miyu	Xiumei Jiao		
2026	Lady Liberty	Zhan Qiao's mother		
