= The True Story of Ah Q (film) =

1981 film

- Film poster
- Directed by: Fan Cen
- Written by: Chen Baichen
- Based on: The True Story of Ah Q by Lu Xun
- Starring: Yan Shunkai; Bao Fumin; Chen Xi; Jin Yikang; Li Wei
- Cinematography: Chen Zhenxiang
- Edited by: Tang Yulong
- Music by: Chen Chuanxi; Wang Yunjie
- Production company: Shanghai Film Studio
- Release date: 4 June 1981
- Running time: 125 minutes
- Country: China
- Language: Mandarin

The True Story of Ah Q (simplified Chinese: 阿Ｑ正传; traditional Chinese: 阿Ｑ正傳; pinyin: Ā Q zhèng zhuàn) is a 1981 Chinese drama film directed by Fan Cen. The film is based on the early 1920s novella of the same name by Lu Xun. It was entered into the 1982 Cannes Film Festival.

== Cast ==
- Bao Fumin as Master Zhao's son
- Chen Xi as Candidate Bai
- Jin Yikang as The Fake Foreign Devil
- Li Wei
- Ni Yilan as Zou Qi Sao
- Wang Suya
- Yan Shunkai as A Qiu
- Zhang Youyun as The Little Nun
