= Zheng Zhenyao =

Chinese actress (1936–2023)

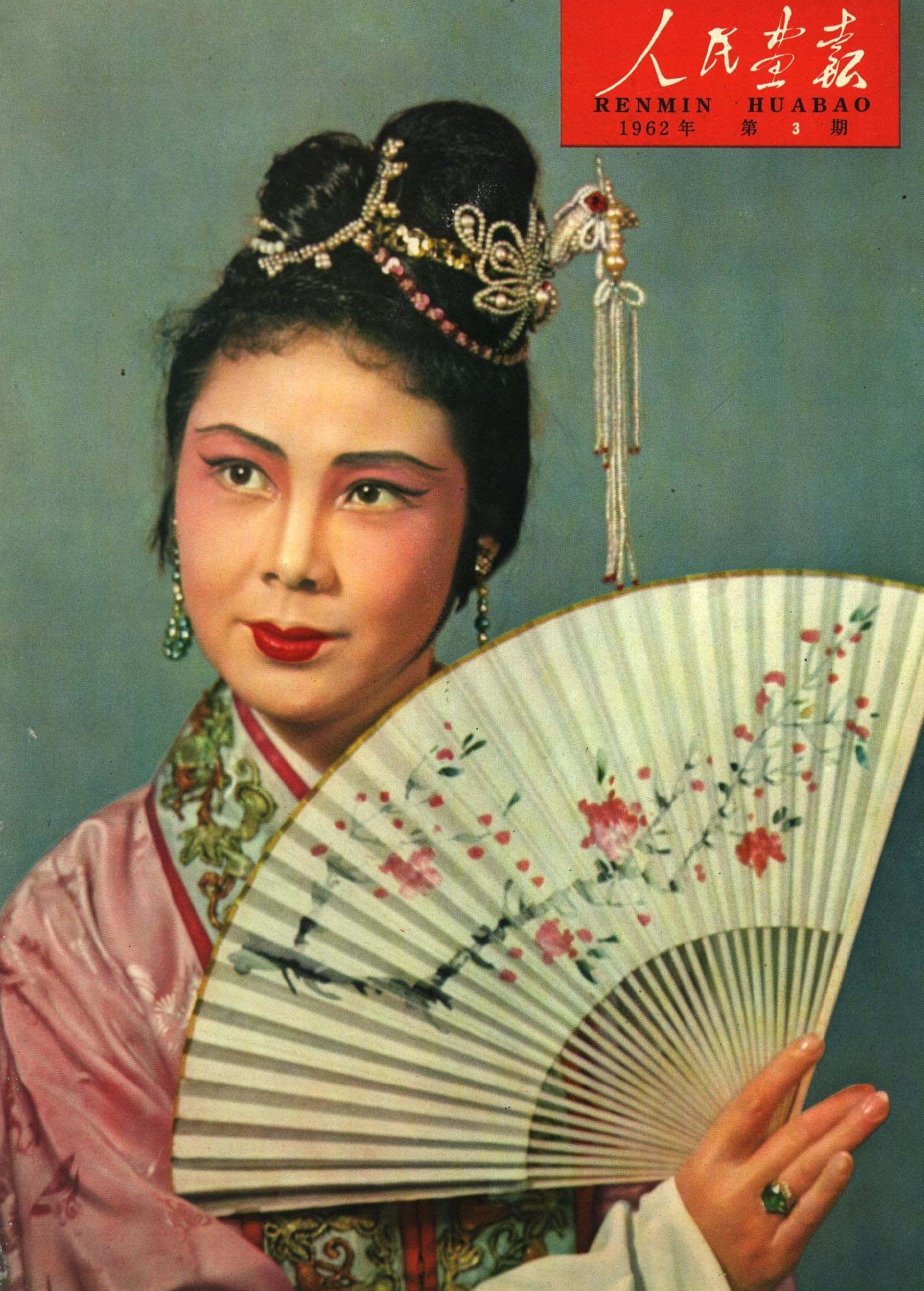
- Born: 7 November 1936; Lingbi, Anhui, China
- Died: 22 May 2023 (aged 86)
- Years active: 1958–2023
- Awards: Golden Rooster Awards – Best Supporting Actress; 1983 My Memories of Old Beijing; Best Actress; 2004 Shanghai Story

Zheng Zhenyao (Chinese: 郑振瑶; pinyin: Zhèng Zhènyáo 7 November 1936 – 22 May 2023) was a Chinese film and television actress. Zheng started her career in the theater stage, but rose to fame through her role as a middle-aged lady in Sparkling Red Star (1974). For her performance in My Memories of Old Beijing (1982), Zheng won Golden Rooster Award for Best Supporting Actress. In 2004, she won Golden Rooster Award for Best Actress for Shanghai Story.

Zheng died on 22 May 2023, at the age of 86.

== Filmography ==
- Sparkling Red Star (1974)
- My Memories of Old Beijing (1982)
- Taiwan Story (2004)
- Shanghai Story (2004)
