= 8th Hundred Flowers Awards =

Chinese film awards ceremony in 1985

Ceremony for the 8th Hundred Flowers Awards was held in Beijing, China in 1985.

== Awards ==
=== Best Film ===
| Winner | Winning film | Nominees |
|---|---|---|
| N/A | Wreaths at the Foot of the Mountain; Life; The Girl in Red | N/A |

=== Best Actor ===
| Winner | Winning film | Nominees |
|---|---|---|
| Lv Xiaohe | Wreaths at the Foot of the Mountain | N/A |

=== Best Actress ===
| Winner | Winning film | Nominees |
|---|---|---|
| Wu Yufang | Life | N/A |

=== Best Supporting Actor ===
| Winner | Winning film | Nominees |
|---|---|---|
| He Wei | Wreaths at the Foot of the Mountain | N/A |

=== Best Supporting Actress ===
| Winner | Winning film | Nominees |
|---|---|---|
| Wang Yumei | Wreaths at the Foot of the Mountain | N/A |
