= Xu Dishan =

Chinese author, translator and folklorist

- 許地山
- Born: 許贊堃; February 3, 1894; Tainan, Taiwan, Qing dynasty
- Died: 4 August 1941 (aged 47); British Hong Kong

Academic background
- Education: Yenching University, Columbia University, Oxford University

Academic work
- Discipline: Sanskrit language, Chinese studies, Indology, comparative religion, folklore
- Institutions: Yenching University, Peking University, University of Hong Kong
- Notable students: Eileen Chang

Xu Dishan (simplified Chinese: 许地山; traditional Chinese: 許地山; pinyin: Xǔ Dìshān; Wade–Giles: Hsü Ti-shan; given name: 贊堃; Zànkūn; pen name: Luo Huasheng; Chinese: 落華生; pinyin: Luò Huáshēng; Wade–Giles: Lo Hua-sheng; 3 February 1893 – 4 August 1941) was a Chinese author, translator and folklorist. He received his education in China, the United States, Britain, and India; while in school, he studied diverse topics in religion, philosophy, and literature. Upon his return to China, he was an active member of the May Fourth Movement, and published literary journals with his academic peers. He wrote a plethora of academic and fictitious works during his life, many of which he published under the pen name Luo Huasheng. He was best known for his short stories that focus on the people from the southern provinces of China and Southeast Asia. The protagonists of his stories were often women. Xu Dishan was a strong proponent of the Latinization Movement and believed that writing Chinese with a phonetic alphabet would greatly increase literacy. He died at age 47 from a heart attack.

== Personal life ==
=== Early life ===
Xu Dishan was born in Tainan, Taiwan on 14 February 1893. He was one of eight children born to his father, Xu Nanying, and mother, Wu Shen. His father was a Taiwanese jinshi who assisted Liu Yongfu to establish the Republic of Formosa in Tainan. After the Japanese takeover in 1895 his family escaped to Shantou via the harbour of Anping. Following the fall of the Republic of Formosa, Xu Nanying resided in Thailand, British Singapore, and Sumatra. After returning from Southeast Asia, Xu Nanying moved his family to Fujian, and in 1897 they settled down in Guangzhou where Xu Dishan received his education. During his stay in Guangzhou, Xu Dishan learned Cantonese, Cantonese opera, Cantonese folk songs, and pipa. He spoke both Hokkien and Teochew as his mother tongues. After the 1911 Revolution, Xu Nanying received position as an administrator in southern Fujian. Xu Dishan accompanied his father and taught in primary and secondary schools in Zhangzhou. Later, he also worked as a teacher in a Chinese-language school in Yangon, Myanmar. In 1915, he moved back to China where he continued to teach for two years. During this time he taught at both the Huaying Middle School and the Second Fujian Provincial Teacher's College.

=== Personal life ===
In 1918, while Xu Dishan was studying at Yenching University, he married his wife, Lin Yuesen, and they had a daughter. After his graduation in 1920, Xu Dishan traveled back to Fujian to bring his wife and daughter to Beijing to live with him; however, his wife died during the journey back to Beijing. In 1929, he married his second wife, Zhou Sisong; together they had a daughter and a son. Xu Dishan died of a heart attack on 4 August 1941.

== Education and academia ==
=== Education ===
In 1917, Xu Dishan attended Yenching University for his undergraduate studies. During this time, he began to study Sanskrit, and studied the poetry of Rabindranath Tagore, a prominent Bengali poet. He graduated in 1920 with his bachelor's degree in literature and enrolled in the seminary at Yenching University to continue his study of comparative religion. In 1922, he received his bachelor's in religious studies from the university. Upon his graduation, he moved to New York City to pursue a master's degree at Columbia University's Department of Indo-Iranian languages; he graduated in 1924 with a master's degree in comparative religion and the history of religion. He then moved to England, and completed another bachelor's degree at the University of Oxford in folklore, Indian philosophy, religious history, and Sanskrit which he completed in 1926. Before returning to China, he spent a year in India at the Banaras Hindu University to continue his studies in Sanskrit; during this time he also studied Indian literature and Buddhism. While in India, he met Tagore who urged him to compile and publish a Chinese–Sanskrit dictionary.

=== Teaching career ===
In 1927, after returning to China from British India, he took up a teaching position at Yenching University. He also spent time teaching at Peking University and Tsinghua University, two elite universities in Beijing. He taught courses that focused on Indian literature and Sanskrit. In 1935, he secured the post of Chinese professor at the University of Hong Kong. His professorship entailed teaching the Confucian classics as well as literature from the Tang and Song dynasties.

== Literary involvement ==
=== Writing style ===
Xu Dishan's writing style diverges from many of his contemporaries. Some of his earliest writings follow convention May Fourth Era story lines, but are not set in China. Xu Dishan takes up Southeast Asian communities as his subjects in many of his stories. Additionally, many of his earliest writings showcase powerful women and explore religious themes. Often, these women gain strength from the teachings of multiple religions, rather than strictly adhering to the dogma of just one; in this way Xu Dishan's female protagonists are world citizens who make their own way in the world. His works with religious underpinnings tend to focus on such themes as love, charity, and other values fundamental to religion; through his writing, he illustrates the omnipresence of religion in all life. His fascination with Theravada Buddhism influences his work, and many of his stories draw inspiration from Buddhist, Hindu, and Christian myths. Many May Fourth Era writers write about myths individually, but Xu Dishan incorporates mythic elements into his stories. Xu Dishan's fiction tends to be romantic and involve sophisticated plot lines which deal with human nature and how to live a good life. They often engage a moral message that usually engages with the idea that how one attains his goal is just as important as the goal itself; in other words, the means are just as important as the ends.

=== Literary involvement (1919–1921) ===
While at Yenching University, Xu Dishan was an active part of the May the Fourth Movement and the New Culture Movement; he participated by attending meetings and organizing conversations with his fellow students. Xu Dishan, Qu Qiubai, and Zheng Zhenduo edited Xin shihue xunkan (New Society Thrice Monthly), a journal that was in publication from November 1919 to May 1920. In 1921, Xu Dishan, Zheng Zhenduo, Mao Dun, and Ye Shaojun founded the literary society Wenxue yanjiu hui (Literary Research Association). Also in 1921, Xu Dishan and Zheng Zhenduo established the Taige'er yanjiu hui (Tagore Research Society), which operated as a subsidiary of the Literary Research Association. Among other duties, the Literary Research Association was responsible for editing Xiaoshuo yuebao (Fiction Monthly), the magazine in which Xu Dishan published his first short stories. Xu Dishan published his writing under the pen name Luo Huasheng.

=== Literary involvement (1925–1934) ===
Xu Dishan continued to publish short publications in Xiaoshuo yuebao (Short Story Monthly) while he studied and taught. In 1925, his short stories were published in the collection Zhuiwang laozhu (The Web Mending Spider), and his essays were collected into the work Kongshan lingyu (Timely Rain on an Empty Mountain). Additionally, he wrote about how Indian and Iranian literature influenced literature produced in China; he continued his engagement with Indian literature by translating Indian fiction into Chinese, and in 1930 published Yindu wenxue (Indian Literature). Besides Indian literature, Xu Dishan wrote on a variety of topics. He gathered works written in English about the Opium Wars, and published Da zhong ji: Yapian zhanzheng qian Zhong Ying jiaoshe shiliao (Meeting Halfway: Historical Materials on Negotiations between China and England before the Opium War) in 1931, and in 1933 published a collection of sacred Buddhist texts: Fozang zimu yinde (Combined Indices to the Authors and Titles in Four Collections of Buddhistic Literature). During this period of time, the late 1920s and early 1930s, he also published several satirical critiques of urban society in contemporary China and the unbridled corruption that was prevalent at the time, as well as articles pertaining to women's clothing and its history in the Chinese context. In 1934, he published the first volume of a project he never completed: a complete history of Chinese Daoism: Daojiao shi (A history of Daoism).

=== Literary involvement (1937–1941) ===
During the Second Sino-Japanese War, Xu supported the war against Japan. He involved himself in several patriotic activities, including writing a one act historical drama in 1938, Nü guoshi (The Woman Patriot) which was performed by the Women's Student Association at the University of Hong Kong. He was one of the founding members of the National Resistance Association of Literary and Art Workers.

Xu was an early figure in the study of spirit writing practices and his 1941 text An Investigation into of the Superstition of Spirit Writing is a major work in the area.

=== Latinization ===
For Xu Dishan, an important part of the legacy of the May Fourth Movement was the implementation of phonetic Chinese. He was a strong proponent of the Latinization Movement. He believed that the Chinese script needed to be reformed and that China should use the Western Roman alphabet to help spell out words phonetically, instead of using characters. Xu Dishan was an advocate of latinization because he saw it as a path to dramatically increase national literacy rates. In this way, he departed from the mainstream belief held by many May Fourth intellectuals; that is, that the Chinese language should adopt baihua (plain speech).

== Publications ==
=== Scholarly work ===
Title	English title	Publication Date	English Translation?
Yuti wenfa dagang	Outline of Prose Grammar	1921	
Yindu wenxue	Indian Literature	1930	
Da zhong ji: Yapian zhanzheng qian Zhong Ying jiaoshe shiliao	Meeting Halfway: Historical Materials on Negotiations between China and England before the Opium War	1931	
Fozang zimu yinde	Combined Indices to the Authors and Titles in Four Collections of Buddhistic Literature	1933	
Daojiao shi	A History of Daoism	1934	

=== Translations ===
Title	English title	Publication Date	English Translation?
Mengjiala minjian gushi	Popular Bengali Stories	1929	
Ershi ye wen	Questions Asked over Twenty Nights	1955	
Taiyang de xiajiang	The Setting Sun	1956	

=== Plays ===
Title	English title	Publication Date	English Translation?
Nü guoshi	The Woman Patriot	1938	

=== Fiction books ===
Title	English title	Publication Date	English Translation?
Zhuiwang laozhu	The Web Mending Spider	1925	
Kongshan lingyu	Timely Rain on an Empty Mountain	1925	
Wufa toudi zhiyoujian	Letters That Could Not Be Sent Anywhere	1927	
Jiefangzhe	The Liberator	1933	
Chuntao	Spring Peach	1935	Yes
Fuji mixin de yanjiu	Research on the Superstitious Belief of the Planchette	1941	

Included Works (Zhuiwang laozhu)
Title	English title	English Translation?
Huanghun hou	After dusk	
Kuyang shenghua	Blooms on a Dried Poplar	Yes
Shangren fu	The Merchant's Wife	Yes
Zhuiwang laozhu	The Web Mending Spider	

Short Fiction
Title	English title	Date	Publication	Translation
明明鳥	Bird of Destiny		In 綴網勞蛛 (The Vain Labour of a Spider)	no
商人婦	A Businessman's Wife		In 綴網勞蛛 (The Vain Labour of a Spider)	yes
換巢鸞鳳	Luan and Feng Change Nests		In 綴網勞蛛 (The Vain Labour of a Spider)	no
黃昏后	After Dusk		In 綴網勞蛛 (The Vain Labour of a Spider)	no
綴網勞蛛	The Vain Labour of a Spider		In 綴網勞蛛 (The Vain Labour of a Spider)	no
無法投遞之郵件	The Post That Cannot Be Delivered		In 綴網勞蛛 (The Vain Labour of a Spider)	no
海世間	The World of the Sea		In 綴網勞蛛 (The Vain Labour of a Spider)	no
枯楊生化	The Withered Poplar Blooms		In 綴網勞蛛 (The Vain Labour of a Spider)	yes
讀芝鞡與茉莉因而想及我的祖母	On Reading "Orchid" and "Jasmin" I Think of My Grandmother		In 綴網勞蛛 (The Vain Labour of a Spider)	no
慕	Admiration		In 綴網勞蛛 (The Vain Labour of a Spider)	no
在費總理底客廳裏	Director Fei's Reception Room		In 解放者 (The Liberator)	yes
三博士	The Three PhD's		In 解放者 (The Liberator)	no
街頭巷尾之倫理	The Ethics of the Man in the Street		In 解放者 (The Liberator)	no
法眼	Magic Eyes		In 解放者 (The Liberator)	no
歸途	Homeward Bound		In 解放者 (The Liberator)	no
解放者	The Liberator		In 解放者 (The Liberator)	no
無憂花	Flower Without Sorrow		In 解放者 (The Liberator)	no
東野先生	Mr. Higashina		In 解放者 (The Liberator)	no
人非人	Inhuman Existence		In 危巢墮簡 (Letters from an Endangered Home)	no
春桃	Chuntao		In 危巢墮簡 (Letters from an Endangered Home)	yes
玉官	Yu Guan		In 危巢墮簡 (Letters from an Endangered Home)	yes
危巢墮簡	Letters from an Endangered Home		In 危巢墮簡 (Letters from an Endangered Home)	no
鐵魚底鰓	The Iron Fish Grills		In 危巢墮簡 (Letters from an Endangered Home)	yes

=== Published posthumously ===
Title	English title	Publication Date	English Translation?
Guoci yu guoxue	Chinese National Essence and National Culture	1946	
Zagan ji	Miscellaneous Thoughts	1946	
Weicaho zhuijian	Letters from an Endangered Nest	1947	
Luo Huansheng wenji	The Collected Works of Luo Huasheng	1957	

Included Works (Weichao zhuijian):
Title	English title	English Translation?
Tieyu de sai	The Iron Fish With Gills	Yes
Yuguan	Yu Guan	Yes

=== Collections ===
Title	English title	Publication Date	English Translation?
Luo Huasheng chuangzuo xuan	A Selection of Luo Huasheng's Work	1936	
Xu Dishan yuwen lunwen ji	Xu Dishan's Treatises on the Chinese Language	1941	
Xu Dishan xuanji	Selected Works by Xu Dishan	1951	
Xu Dishan xuanji	The Selected Works of Xu Dishan	1958	
Xu Dishan xiaoshuo xuan	The Selected Fiction of Xu Dishan	1984	
Xu Dishan sanwen quanbian	The Complete Essays of Xu Dishan	1992	
Xu Dishan wenji	The Collected Works of Xu Dishan	1998	

=== English translations of Xu Dishan's writing ===
- "Big Sister Liu." In Stories from the Thirties. 2 volumes. Beijing: Panda Books, 1982, 1: 111–41.
- "Blooms on a Dried Poplar." In Stories from the Thirties. 2 volumes. Beijing: Panda Books, 1982, 1: 71–97.
- "Director Fei's Reception Room." In Stories from the Thirties. 2 volumes. Beijing: Panda Books, 1982, 1: 98–110.
- "I think." Tr. Yunte Huang. In The Big Red Book of Modern Chinese Literature. Ed, Yunte Huang. New York: Norton, 2016.
- "The Iron Fish With Gills." In Stories from the Thirties. 2 volumes. Beijing: Panda Books, 1982, 1: 141–57.
- "The Merchant's Wife." Tr. William H. Nienhauser, Jr. In Modern Chinese Stories and Novellas, 1919–1949. Eds, Lao, Hsia, Lee. New York: Columbia University Press, 1981, 41–50.
- "The Peanut." Tr. Yunte Huang. In The Big Red Book of Modern Chinese Literature. Ed, Yunte Huang. New York: Norton, 2016.
- "Spring Peach." Tr. Zhihua Fang. In Chinese Stories of the Twentieth Century. Ed, Zhihua Fang. New York: Garland Publishing, 1995, 173–201.
- "Yu-kuan." Tr. Cecile Chu-chin Sun. In Modern Chinese Stories and Novellas, 1919–1949. Eds, Lao, Hsia, Lee. New York: Columbia University Press, 1981, 51–87.
