= 4th Hundred Flowers Awards =

Chinese film awards ceremony in 1981

Ceremony for the 4th Hundred Flowers Awards was held on May 23, 1981, Beijing.

== Awards ==
=== Best Film ===
Winner	Winning film	Nominees
N/A	Legend of the Tianyun Mountain; Romance on Lushan Mountain; The Seventh-Rank Sesame Seed-Sized Official	N/A

=== Best Actor ===
Winner	Winning film	Nominees
Da Shichang	Come Home Swallow	N/A

=== Best Actress ===
Winner	Winning film	Nominees
Zhang Yu	Love on Lushan Mountain	N/A
