= Yan Shunkai =

Chinese comedian, actor and film director

- Yan Shunkai.
- Born: June 6, 1937; Shanghai, Republic of China
- Died: 16 October 2017 (aged 80); Shanghai, People's Republic of China
- Education: Central Academy of Drama
- Occupations: Director, actor
- Years active: 1980-2010
- Awards: Hundred Flowers Awards – Best Actor; 1983 The True Story of Ah Q

Chinese name
- Traditional Chinese: 嚴順開
- Simplified Chinese: 严顺开
Transcriptions
Standard Mandarin
- Hanyu Pinyin: Yán Shùnkāi

Yan Shunkai (Chinese: 严顺开; 6 June 1937 – 16 October 2017) was a Chinese comedian, actor and film director.

Yan rose to fame after portraying Ah Q in The True Story of Ah Q, which was based on an episodic novella by Lu Xun, one of the pioneers of modern Chinese literature. He was awarded the Best Actor at the 6th Hundred Flowers Awards and earned "The Gold Stick Prize" at the Second International Comedy Film Festival of Vevey, Switzerland in 1982.

== Biography ==
=== Early life and education ===
Born in Shanghai on June 6, 1937, Yan enrolled in the Central Academy of Drama in 1959, graduating in 1963. After graduation, he joined the Shanghai Farce Troupe (上海滑稽剧团).

=== Career ===
Yan first garnered recognition for his acting in 1980, when his performance in The True Story of Ah Q earned him a Best Actor award at the 6th Hundred Flowers Awards, the Chinese equivalent of the Golden Globes, and received "The Gold Stick Prize" at the Second International Comedy Film Festival of Vevey, Switzerland in 1982. The film is his film debut.

Yan co-starred with Liu Falu, Jin Kangmin, Niu Hong, Chen Qi and Fang Qingzhuo in the 1983 film Spring in the Hometown as a lame person.

In 1984, Yan starred as Du Xiaoxi in Wang Weiyi's drama film The New Stories Of Du Xiaoxi.

Yan appeared in the romance film The Female Director's Boyfriend (1986), in which he played Cui Hailong.

In 1988, Yan made his directorial debut The Story of Ah Tan, and he also starred as Ah Tan in the film.

In 1996, Yan starred with Lu Yanfang in the comedy film The Harmonious Gouple.

Yan appeared in Huang Jianzhong's Girls in the Red Chamber (2002), based on Cao Xueqin's classical novel Dream of the Red Chamber, as Jia She, one of the heads of the Jia family.

In 2003, he was cast in the romance television series Dear Angle with Chang Yue and Li Xiaolu.

Yan filmed in Legend of the Book's Tower, a wuxia television series starring Sharla Cheung, Nicky Wu, Allen Lin, and Tiffany Tang.

In 2006, Yan had a minor role in Pretty Girls in Jianghu. The drama stars Christy Chung, Du Chun, and Liang Guanhua.

In 2010, when he was 72, he starred as Wang Mugen, reuniting him with co-star Yvonne Yung, who played his daughter-in-law, in the television series My Ugly Dad.

=== Death ===
Yan died on 16 October 2017, aged 80, in Shanghai.

== Filmography ==
=== Film ===
Year	English title	Chinese title	Role	Notes
1981	The True Story of Ah Q	阿Q正传	Ah Q	
1983	Spring in the Hometown	鼓乡春晓	A lame person who named Zhu	
1984	The New Stories Of Du Xiaoxi	阿混新传	Du Xiaoxi	
1986	The Female Director's Boyfriend	女局长的男朋友	Cui Hailong	
1988	The Story of Ah Tan	阿谭内传	Ah Tan	also director
1996	The Harmonious Gouple	夫唱妻和	Mu Ahman	
2000	A Widow's Romance	好女不愁嫁	Lao Wogua	
2005	Silver Ornaments	银饰	The old craftsman	

=== TV series ===
Year	English title	Chinese title	Role	Notes
1994	Mr. Wang and Xiao Chen	王先生和小陈	Mr. Wang	
1997		新72家客房	Shui Gen	
2001		小皮匠登基	The old craftsman	
2002	Girls in the Red Chamber	红楼丫头	Jia She	
2003	Dear Angle	我的淘气天使	Cheng Dongming	
2004	Our Story	我们的故事	Yan Fugen	
2004	Legend of the Book's Tower	风满楼	Master Ao	
2004		王保长后传	specialist	
2005	Dead Men Do Tell Tales	大宋提刑官	Censor Feng	
2006	Pretty Girls in Jianghu	江湖俏佳人	His Royal Highness Zhu	
2010	My Ugly Dad	我的丑爹	Wang Mugen	

=== CCTV New Year's Gala ===
Year	English title	Chinese title	Cast members	Notes
1983	A Monologue of Ah Q	阿Q的独白		
1983	Playing the Piano	弹钢琴		
1983	Visiting the Factory	逛厂甸	Siqin Gaowa	
1990	Fellow Sufferers	难兄难弟	Huang Hong	
1992	Stars	今夜星辰	Sun Qixin, Liang Guyin, Chen Xu and Da Shichang	
1993	Zhang San	张三其人	Zhao Lingqi, Yang Xinming, Xu Xiaofan and Ju Bo	
1998	Road	我在马路边	Du Ninglin, Zhao Lingqi and Jiang Xiaohan	
1999	Father and Son	爱父如爱子	Zhang Kaili, L Ding and Wang Xinyue	
2004	Storytelling	讲故事	Hong Jiantao and Xiao Dingdang	
2007		假话真情	Lin Yongjian, Liu Xiaomei and Liu Guijuan	

== Film and TV Awards ==
Year	Nominated work	Award	Result	Notes
1982	The True Story of Ah Q	Second International Comedy Film Festival of Vevey, Switzerland - Best Actor	Won	
1983	The True Story of Ah Q	6th Hundred Flowers Awards for Best Actor	Won	
