= Rickshaw Boy (film) =

- Film poster

Chinese name
- Traditional Chinese: 駱駝祥子
- Simplified Chinese: 骆驼祥子
- Literal meaning: Xiangzi the Camel
Transcriptions
Standard Mandarin
- Hanyu Pinyin: luòtuo Xiángzǐ
Yue: Cantonese
- Jyutping: lok3 to4 coeng4 zi2
- Directed by: Ling Zifeng
- Screenplay by: Ling Zifeng
- Based on: Rickshaw Boy by Lao She
- Starring: Siqin Gaowa; Zhang Fengyi
- Cinematography: Wu Shenghan
- Edited by: Ma Zhizhen
- Music by: Qu Xixian
- Production company: Beijing Film Studio
- Release dates: 1982 (China); October 1983 (Chicago International Film Festival)
- Running time: 123 minutes
- Country: China
- Language: Mandarin

Rickshaw Boy (Chinese: 骆驼祥子) is a 1982 Chinese movie directed by Ling Zifeng, based upon the novel of the same name by Lao She. The film stars Siqin Gaowa, who won a Golden Rooster for her performance, and Zhang Fengyi.

== Plot ==
Xiang Zi is a rickshaw boy who has always had a desire to excel and a thirst for freedom. He married Hu Niu who died of dystocia later. After her death, another girl, Xiao Fuzi, falls in love with Xiang Zi but they are separated by poverty. Xiang Zi works very hard in order to change his life, only to find that Xiao Fuzi is dead just as he begins to be hopeful for their future. Finally, Xiang Zi, an unflinching man, surrenders to that dark society.

== Cast ==
- Siqin Gaowa as Hu Niu
- Yan Bide as Liu Siye
- Zhang Fengyi as Xiang Zi

== Reception ==
=== Awards ===
- Golden Rooster Award for Best Picture at the 3rd Golden Rooster Awards (1982, won)
- Golden Rooster Award for Best Actress at the 3rd Golden Rooster Awards (1982, won - tied with Pan Hong)
- Golden Rooster Award for Best Art Director at the 3rd Golden Rooster Awards (1982, won)
- Golden Rooster Award for Best Sound at the 3rd Golden Rooster Awards (1982, won)
- Outstanding Film at the Huabiao Film Awards (1982, won)
- Best Film at the Hundred Flowers Awards (1983, won - three way tie with At Middle Age and The Herdsman)
- Best Actress at the Hundred Flowers Awards (1983, won)
