= 11th Hundred Flowers Awards =

Chinese film awards ceremony in 1988

Ceremony for the 11th Hundred Flowers Awards was held in 1988, Beijing.

== Awards ==
=== Best Film ===
Winner	Winning film	Nominees
N/A	Red Sorghum; Old Well; The Wilderness	N/A

=== Best Actor ===
Winner	Winning film	Nominees
Zhang Yimou	Old Well	N/A

=== Best Actress ===
Winner	Winning film	Nominees
Liu Xiaoqing	The Wilderness	N/A

=== Best Supporting Actor ===
Winner	Winning film	Nominees
Chen Peisi	Soccer Heroes	N/A

=== Best Supporting Actress ===
Winner	Winning film	Nominees
Lü Liping	Old Well	N/A
