= 12th Hundred Flowers Awards =

Chinese film awards ceremony in 1989

Ceremony for the 12th Hundred Flowers Awards was held in 1989, Beijing.

== Awards ==
=== Best Film ===
Winner	Winning film	Nominees
N/A	A Woman for Two; The Village of Widows; The Republic Will Never Forget	N/A

=== Best Actor ===
Winner	Winning film	Nominees
Jiang Wen	A Woman for Two	N/A

=== Best Actress ===
Winner	Winning film	Nominees
Liu Xiaoqing	A Woman for Two	N/A

=== Best Supporting Actor ===
Winner	Winning film	Nominees
Shen Junyi	Happy Heroes	N/A

=== Best Supporting Actress ===
Winner	Winning film	Nominees
Gong Li	Codename Cougar	N/A
