= 9th Hundred Flowers Awards =

Chinese film awards ceremony in 1986

Ceremony for the 9th Hundred Flowers Awards was held in 1986, Beijing.

== Awards ==
=== Best Film ===
Winner	Winning film	Nominees
N/A	Juvenile Delinquents; Sunrise; Our Retired Veterans	N/A

=== Best Actor ===
Winner	Winning film	Nominees
Yang Zaibao	The Acting Mayor	N/A

=== Best Actress ===
Winner	Winning film	Nominees
Fang Shu	Sunrise	N/A

=== Best Supporting Actor ===
Winner	Winning film	Nominees
Chen Yude	Our Retired Veterans	N/A

=== Best Supporting Actress ===
Winner	Winning film	Nominees
Wang Fuli	Sunrise	N/A
