= Niu Ben =

Chinese actor (born 1935)

- Born: Tianjin, China
- Awards: Golden Phoenix Awards; 1993 Society Award; 2009 Honorary Award; 2017 Lifetime Achievement AwardGolden Rooster Awards – Best Supporting Actor; 1983 The Herdsman Hundred Flowers Awards – Best Supporting Actor; 1983 The Herdsman; 1997 Fu chang qi he 1999 Xi fu ni dang jia

Chinese name
- Traditional Chinese: 牛犇
- Simplified Chinese: 牛犇
Transcriptions
Standard Mandarin
- Hanyu Pinyin: Níu Bēn

Zhang Xuejing (张学景; born 9 July 1935), stagename Niu Ben (牛犇) is a Chinese film actor.

== Biography ==
He lost both of his parents at the age of six, then lived with his oldest brother, who worked as a driver at the third film factory in Beijing. In 1946, 11-year-old Ben was chosen to act as a village boy "little ox" and became a child star. His stage name Niu Ben is composed of Niu the Chinese character of "牛" (ox, a common surname) and Ben "犇" (three oxen together, a less common personal name). He later played child roles in old Chinese films and went to Hong Kong.

After the foundation of People's Republic of China, he returned to mainland China and became an actor of the Shanghai Film Studio, and one of the members of the 5th China Film Association. In his 60-year career, he has been in hundreds of films and TV plays, and is still active in Chinese film.

== Personal awards ==
- Golden Rooster Awards = Best Supporting Actor:
  1983 The Herdsman
- Hundred Flowers Awards = Best Supporting Actor:
  1983
  1997
  1999

== Select filmography ==
- Soul of the Sea (1957)
- The Red Detachment of Women (1961)
- Tink, Tink, the Fountain (1982)
- The Herdsman (1983)
- Chess King (1988)
- To Live (1994)
- Husband Sings, Wife Accompanies (1997)
- Indomitable Daughter in Law (1999)
- The Longest Night in Shanghai (2007)
- Five Minutes to Tomorrow (2014)
- Lovers & Movies (2015)

== See also ==
- Cinema of China
