= 3rd Hundred Flowers Awards =

Chinese film awards ceremony in 1980

The ceremony for the 3rd Hundred Flowers Awards was held on May 23, 1980, in Beijing. The event was suspended seventeen years during the Cultural Revolution.

== Awards ==
=== Best Film ===
Winner	Winning film	Nominees
N/A	Little Flower; Ji Hongchang; Tear Stains	N/A

=== Best Director ===
Winner	Winning film	Nominees
Xie Tian	A Sweet Life	N/A

=== Best Screenplay ===
Winner	Winning film	Nominees
Chen Lide	Ji Hongchang	N/A

=== Best Actor ===
Winner	Winning film	Nominees
Li Rentang	Tear Stains	N/A

=== Best Actress ===
Winner	Winning film	Nominees
Joan Chen	Little Flower	N/A

=== Best Supporting Actress ===
Winner	Winning film	Nominees
Liu Xiaoqing	What a Family	N/A

=== Best Animation ===
Winning film	Nominees
Nezha Conquers the Dragon King; Clever Avantis	N/A

=== Best Chinese Opera Film ===
Winning film	Nominees
Romance of the Iron Bow	N/A
