= Li Shuangshuang =

1962 Chinese film

Li Shuangshuang (李双双 Lǐ Shuāngshuang) is a 1962 Chinese comedy-propaganda film written by Li Zhun and directed by Lu Ren.

Filmed and set during the Great Leap Forward, it focuses on a peasant woman (Li Shuangshuang) who is married to Sun Xiwang. Sun Xiwang is an old-fashioned man who struggles to understand the changing social circumstances of the era. Unlike her husband, Li Shuangshuang is a model member of society who condemns the laziness and corruption of other members of the commune. Shuangshuang, sick of staying at home and working on domestic labor, leads the commune to take part in the progress of the Great Leap Forward.

The story of Li Shuangshuang first appeared in The People's Literature in 1960. After becoming a huge success amongst China’s citizens it was made into a movie. The story was next adapted into a comic strip so it could be easily enjoyed by all. This form of replicating the same story into multiple mediums was common during the early Mao period. Films like Li Shuangshuang were produced with the goal of “assist[ing] with current political, social, and economic campaigns. For education as much as entertainment, these films presented model characters in model situations”. Thus the film contributed to a series of propaganda promoting an idealized version of what life could be like in a commune.

The film garnered huge success, winning the second Hundred Flowers Award for best feature film in 1963 from a countrywide spectator vote. Lead actress Zhang Ruifang was also awarded the Hundred Flowers Award for Best Actress for her performance.

== Characters ==
- Li Shuangshuang
- Sun Xiwang
- Sun Youquan
- Sun Yong
- Jinqiao
- Clerk Liu
- Er Chun
- Guiying
- Sun Youpo

== Plot ==
=== Main Plot ===
The movie begins with Sun Xiwan, bragging to his friends about how his wife obeys him. The other men admire her skills and their happy marriage. However, when they arrive at their house Xiwan learns his wife is quarrelling with another neighbor. Li Shuangshuang accuses the neighbor of stealing from the commune while being lazy at work. Xiwan tries to break up their fight but Shuangshuang only leaves after she has made her point.

In the next scene Li shuangshuang and the other village girls discuss the progress the commune is making. When they find out that the commune is in need of more laborers they insist they can help out, however, they are turned away since women can’t do heavy labor. The next day they go and work in the fields anyway. This upsets Sun Xiwan who is left at home to make his own dinner and care for their child. When Shuangshuang returns Xiwan has done none of the domestic work claiming that it is a woman's responsibility. They get into a fight and Shuangshuang kicks him out of the house.

While he is gone Shuanshuang and the other women conspire to create a system that works better for the collective. They believe women aren't farming or building because of the non-standardized working system. They decide to write down their solution and hang their advice in the village. The advice is received well and a village meeting is held to discuss the points Li Shuangshuang made. During the village meeting it is decided that more work will be given more pay. They then realize they will need a work point scorer. Sun Xiwang is nominated for the role, however he declines saying that he cannot do accounting. Li Shuangshuan counters him claiming he can and he taught her how. The commune decides to offer her the role instead, but her husband, embarrassed, insists he can do it better. Ultimately it is decided that both Sun Xiwang and a village girl Guiying will take the position.

However, villagers begin to abuse the system, performing poor work quickly for more points. Li Shuangshuang is appalled by the corruption. After she learns that her husband has also been abusing the point system she reports his misdeeds to the commune. Because of her honesty she is appointed a role as cadre for the commune. When She returns Sun Xiwang threatens to leave if she does not stay in line and mind her own business. Li Shuangshuang tells him to go and he leaves. Li Shuangshuang then critiques council members who have been taking advantage of the system. Her remarks result in members accepting only the work points they earn.

While Xiwang is away from home one of the older village members advises him to return to his wife. At first he is resistant, however, after watching Li Shuangshuang and all the women happily working the fields he realizes the error of his ways. Xiwang returns home and they are happy again. However he admits to witnessing his friend taking advantage of the commune. Xiwang didn’t have the courage to rebuke his actions. Shuangshuang cries and leaves to report the crime to the party. This time Xiwang beats her to it and scolds his friend who finally sees the error of his ways. Thus the movie ends happily.

=== Subplot of Guiying and Erchun ===
==== Marriage and Family Context ====
In 1950, the New Marriage Law substantially differed from previous versions in the Communist base areas and was similar to the Nationalist Civil Code of 1930. The reformed law marked the end of the “feudal marriage system” and of the “supremacy of man over woman”. Specifically, “it outlawed bigamy, concubinage, child betrothal, interference in widow remarriage, the exaction of money or gifts in conjunction with a marriage agreement, and compelling someone to marry against their will”. Arranged marriage, though it still occurred in the rural areas during the Mao period thanks to inexperienced village leaders who were preoccupied with land reform campaigns, was less popular as the Marriage Law instead promoted choice between a couple and no parental interference.

==== Plot ====
Guiying was the daughter of another Sun family in the commune, and was close with Shuangshuang. At the beginning of the film, Guiying and Erchun were getting close, as people in the commune often teased them as well. However, Guiying’s parents had always fancied for her a life in the city, and arranged for Guiying to marry comrade Wang, who worked in the city. When Guiying learned about the match, she was too embarrassed to meet comrade Wang herself and tell him she was interested in someone else. So Guiying asked Shuangshuang to meet up with him and convey her thoughts. After Shuangshuang passed on Guiying’s message to Wang, he did not show any disrespect or appear offended. Instead, Wang showed immense understanding and support for Guiying’s own will in choosing her partner and said that the parents should not have too much control over their children’s marriage since the era was different.

The portrayal of Guiying in the film perfectly embodied a young girl’s changed experience under the marriage reform. For one thing, Guiying was able to reject a match arranged by her family, even though she did not dare to do it herself. Similarly, comrade Wang also depicted the support for the new marriage law from a male perspective. By illustrating both Guiying and comrade Wang, the film strived to deliver a message of marriage equality from both men and women.

== Historical Context ==
The film was released during the Mao era at the end of The Great Leap Forward. During this time mobilizing women to work for collective tasks was central to the party's efforts to raise agricultural production. Before this point rural communities often faced difficulties surviving the harvest season with enough to eat. The Great Leap Forward intended to change that by merging production units into vast communes. Communes in the countryside were so large they could include up to several hundred thousand people. Consequently many of the rural men left their villages to accomplish infrastructure projects far from their hometown. With so many of the men away rural communities were faced with an extreme labor shortage. Thus the party mobilized rural women to take action and accomplish the agricultural work that had historically been left to the men.

Exemplary workers could be selected as labor models where their good deeds would be publicized and touted as a way of motivating other women to mobilize and work hard for their commune. In addition to being talented laborers they had to maintain the domestic sphere as well. Li Shuangshuang illustrates a perfect example of what is expected of women during this time period. However, she differs from traditional labor models in one key way, she was not free from scandal. Traditional labor models had to be well liked by everyone in their community and free from any kind of gossip or impropriety.

=== Chinese Cinema ===
The CCP has had a long history of utilizing film as a way to disseminate propaganda throughout the nation. As early as 1950 the government created a quota system to ensure that the content of film productions aligned with the parties current concerns. By 1953 the distribution of “rural feature films'' that would cater to the peasant population became a top priority of government policymakers. Thus “stories about agricultural successes in agriculture and industry” were promoted during The Great Leap Forward.

== Political Message ==
=== Production Mode ===
The story of Li Shuangshuang first appeared in People’s Literature in 1960, was later adapted into a film, and eventually turned into a lianhuanhua, or an illustrated storybook. This was not uncommon in the Maoist era for the apparent political efficacy of this mode of literary production. Not only was the same narrative repeated multiple times, enough to make an impact on people’s perception of a Party-led life, but it also reached audiences from different social strata. The propagated message could arrive at the door of intellectuals who read the literary magazine People’s Literature, children who enjoy illustrations, and those who have a taste in the new media of film.

=== Content ===
Through portraying Li Shuangshuang as "a creative, energetic woman who embodied the ideals of a new peasant", the film acts as the state's guidelines for women to strive for "equality and the achievement of socialist ideals".

==== Women as Symbol - Models ====
In the 1950s, exceptional women of the rural areas would be identified as labor models: “skilled farmers, dedicated midwives, astute livestock handlers, and tenacious cotton-growing heroines”. The purpose of establishing women labor models was, of course, to mobilize women to participate in the labor force by creating images of strong and fearless women.

In the film, although not explicitly described, Li Shuangshuang embodied the qualities of a “new peasant” that was desired by the Party. Shuangshuang was strong and skilled at farming, and she was fair at managing production affairs in the commune. Due to her leadership, she was more important than some of the men in the commune.

The portrayal of Li Shuangshuang as a labor model also had political significance. For one, female labor models were the only “sources of social capital” for the communes to mobilize labor force. The major difference between Li Shuangshaung and traditional labor models in the Maoist era, however, was that Shuangshuang did not need to be “trained and discovered”. Shuangshuang was rather “constructed as naturally connected to the land and her fellow villagers, and without need for a transformation”. This further promoted the image of a rural woman who naturally felt obligated to devote herself to the socialist construction.

==== Family and Domestic Affairs ====
The film depicted two distinct viewpoints on women’s role in the domestic sphere. Sun Xiwang was somewhat backward and believed that household chores were a part of women’s responsibilities, Li Shuangshuang thought whoever was available should do the chores. It was not until the commune cadre convinced Xiwang that Shuangshuang should be praised for her contribution that Xiwang changed his attitude towards the necessity of women’s labor in all domestic chores. Xiwang even made a meal when Shuangshuang returned home late. This change of attitude also hinted at the power of state intervention in household gender relations.

==== Women as Independent Individuals ====
At the beginning of the film, Xiwang often referred to Shuangshuang as “‘the person in my house’ or, ‘the woman who cooks for me’”. In the original book, A Brief Biography of Li Shuangshuang, Shuangshuang was often called “Xiwang’s wife” or “Xiwang’s woman”, and when she became a mother, “Little Chrysanthemum’s mother”. Whichever name that Shuangshunag was called, they were all attached to her husband or child. Thus, “Li Shuangshuang was still an appendage of a patriarchal society”.

However, when Li Shuangshuang began to step out of her domestic sphere and participate in collective production, both her and Xiwang’s perception of her role changed. In A Brief Biography of Li Shuangshuang, Shuangshuang expressed a strong desire to take part in labor outside of the home. Shuangshuang thought, “The Great Leap Forward is turning the sky red outside… Can I let myself be tied down by this household for the rest of my life?”. The Communist society was ready for “the labor of housewives”, and “once they gain the right to work, they relish their feeling of connectedness” to the collective production. At the end of the film, Li Shuangshuang earned respect for her ability in the fields and in managing the work points system. She was known as an independent entity rather than a sub-identity known only as Xiwang’s wife or the child’s mother.
