= 7th Hundred Flowers Awards =

Chinese film awards ceremony in 1984

Ceremony for the 7th Hundred Flowers Awards was held in 1984, Beijing.

== Awards ==
=== Best Film ===
Winner	Winning film	Nominees
N/A	Our Niu Baisui; Ward 16; The Story Should Not Have Happened	N/A

=== Best Actor ===
Winner	Winning film	Nominees
Yang Zibao	Blood Always Be Hot	N/A

=== Best Actress ===
Winner	Winning film	Nominees
Gong Xue	Under the Bridge	N/A

=== Best Supporting Actor ===
Winner	Winning film	Nominees
Liu Xinyi	The Happy Bachelors	N/A

=== Best Supporting Actress ===
Winner	Winning film	Nominees
Wang Fuli	Out Niu Baisui	N/A
