= Ling Zifeng =

Chinese film director (1917–1999)

Ling Zifeng (凌子风 pinyin: Líng Zifēng, born 凌风 Líng Fēng, Beijing, 30 April 1917 – 2 March 1999) was a Chinese film writer and director.

== Biography ==
Ling was born in Beijing to a Manchu family originally from Hejiang, Luzhou, in Sichuan Province. He entered the National Art School in Beijing (国立北平艺术专科学校) in 1933 to study first Western oil painting and modern sculpture, and later went to the Nanjing National Theatre Academy (南京国立戏剧专科学校) from 1935 to 1937 to study acting. During the Second Sino-Japanese War, he served both in military operations and in propaganda activities. In 1943, he became a professor at the theatre department of the Lu Xun Academy of Art, an art school in Yan'an founded in 1938 by Chinese Communist Party leaders, including Mao Zedong and Zhou Enlai. In 1945, he married the actress Shi Lianxing (石联星 1914–1984), who later gained wide acclaim for her role as Zhao Yiman (赵一曼), the heroine of the eponymous biopic (1950) by Sha Meng (沙蒙 1907–1964). The couple had three children.

In 1946, Ling was commissioned by the Chinese Communist Party to set up a film team and a studio in Yan'an to produce a propaganda movie on "The hero of work Wu Manyou" (劳动英雄吴满友) which was released later in 1946. In 1947, Ling became a member of the Chinese Communist Party and began to work as an official for the Municipal Party Committee of Shijiazhuang, where he later was in charge of the department of Cinema, Theatre and Music. His first major film was Daughters of China (中华女儿, Zhonghua Nü'er), produced at Changchun Film Studio in 1949. As a sculptor, Ling also created the first medal portrait of Mao Zedong.

During the Cultural Revolution, Ling was relegated to a party school and did not produce any movies until 1979. He started a second career in the 1980s as a master of literary adaptations and was acclaimed, in 1995, as pre-eminent Chinese film director of the 20th century.

He died on March 2, 1999.

== Filmography ==
- Daughters of China (中华女儿, Zhonghua Nü'er, 1949), winner of Freedom Award at the Karlovy Vary International Film Festival
- The Gold and Silver River Band (金银滩, 1953), Prize at the FIRST International Film Festival Xining.
- Mother (母亲, 1956), Prize at the Czechoslovak International Film Festival
- Chrysanthemums in Mountains (1958)
- Red Flag Chronicle (红旗谱, 1960), also known as Keep Red Flag Flying, an adaptation of the novel by Liang Bin 梁斌
- Li Siguang (李四光, 1979)
- Savage Land (原野, 1981)
- Rickshaw Boy (骆驼祥子, Luo Tuo Xiangzi, 1982), an adaptation of the novel by Lao She 老舍, Winner of Best Film (together with At Middle Age) at Golden Rooster Awards
- The Border Town (边城, 1984), an adaptation of the novel by Shen Congwen 沈从文, Golden Rooster Award for Ling Zifeng as Best Director; Prizes also from the Locarno Film Festival and the Montreal World Film Festival
- Spring Peach (春桃, 1988), also known as A Woman for Two, an adaptation of the novel by Xu Dishan 许地山
- Kuang (狂, 1992), also known as Crazy or Ripples Across Stagnant Waters, an adaptation of the novel by Li Jieren 李劼人.

== Literature ==
Brigitte Duzan, Ling Zifeng 1917-1999, in: Chinese Movies, ed. by Zhang Xiaoqiu (23 october 2016), https://www.chinesemovies.com.fr/cineastes_Ling_Zifeng.htm
