= 10th Hundred Flowers Awards =

Chinese film awards ceremony in 1987

Ceremony for the 10th Hundred Flowers Awards was held in 1987, Beijing.

== Awards ==
=== Best Film ===
Winner	Winning film	Nominees
N/A	Sun Zhongshan; Hibiscus Town; The Battle of Taierzhuang	N/A

=== Best Actor ===
Winner	Winning film	Nominees
Jiang Wen	Hibiscus Town	N/A

=== Best Actress ===
Winner	Winning film	Nominees
Liu Xiaoqing	Hibiscus Town	N/A

=== Best Supporting Actor ===
Winner	Winning film	Nominees
Zhu Shibin	Hibiscus Town	N/A

=== Best Supporting Actress ===
Winner	Winning film	Nominees
Zhang Xiaomin	Sun Zhongshan	N/A
