= Romance on Lushan Mountain =

- Directed by: Huang Zumo
- Written by: Bi Bicheng
- Produced by: Shanghai Film Studio
- Starring: Zhang Yu; Guo Kaiming; Wen Xiyang
- Cinematography: Shan Lianguo
- Music by: Lu Qiming
- Release date: 1980
- Country: People's Republic of China
- Box office: CN¥100 million

Romance on Lushan Mountain (simplified Chinese: 庐山恋; traditional Chinese: 廬山戀; pinyin: Lúshān Liàn) is a 1980 colour film produced in China. It was in its entirety shot at Mount Lu in Jiujiang, China and was directed by Huang Zumo (黄祖模). It is alternatively known as A Love Story at Lushan Mountain and Love on Lushan Mountain.

The film sold more than 140 million tickets and grossed more than CN¥100 million in China. It holds the Guinness World Record for "the longest first run of a film in one cinema" for having been shown continuously since 1980.

== Plot ==
In the 1970s, after the establishment of diplomatic relations between the People's Republic of China and the United States, Zhou Jun, the daughter of a retired Kuomintang general, Zhou Zhenwu, who now lives in America, visits mainland China for sightseeing. In Mount Lu, she meets Geng Hua, a young man who is preparing his college entrance exams, and they fall in love. Geng's father, an officer in the Chinese Communist Party, is now under political investigation by Gang of Four. The junior Geng is accompanying his unwell mother to the mountain for rehabilitation. Due to his frequent contacts with Zhou, Geng is summoned for interrogation. Zhou returns to the States with regrets.

After the fall of Gang of Four, Zhou, still keeping her feelings for Geng in her heart, visits Mount Lu again. Geng, now a postgraduate student of Tsinghua University, happens to come to Mount Lu for academic colloquium. Fortunately, these two reunite and decide to marry each other. Geng Hua asks his father, Geng Feng, for his agreement, and shows him the photo of Miss Zhou's family. The senior Geng recognizes that the girl's father, Zhou Zhenwu, was his classmate back in Whampoa Military Academy. Because they followed different political parties, they became the rivals in the battlefield during Chinese Civil War. Thus, he immediately rejects this marriage. After some difficulties, the two seniors, both with the intention of reunification of China, meet on Mount Lu. The hostility is thawed, and they become relatives by marriage when the junior Zhou and Geng finally get together.

== World record ==
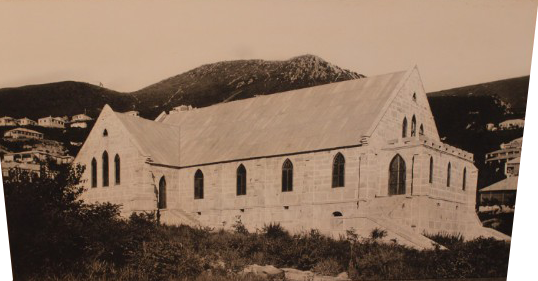
Lushan Mountain Union Church, currently known as Love Story in Lushan Cinema (Chinese: 庐山恋电影院).

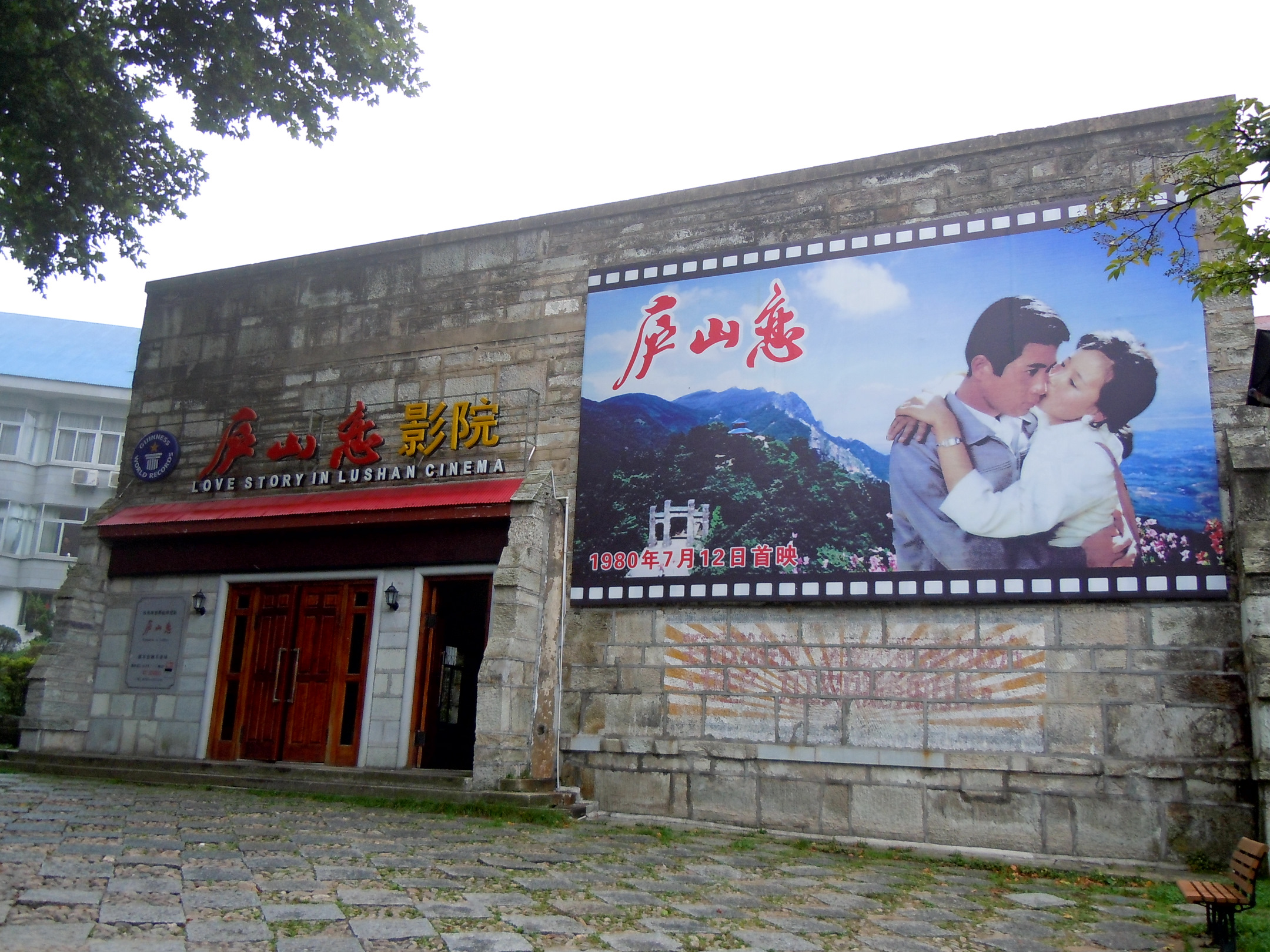
Love Story in Lushan Cinema

According to Guinness World Records, this film has the Longest First-Run of a Film in One Cinema (Love Story in Lushan Cinema). It premiered at the Jiangxi Movie Circulation and Screening Company in Lushan, China, on July 12, 1980, and has been shown daily up to now. Watching the film at the said cinema has become a tourist attraction.
