= 5th Hundred Flowers Awards =

Chinese film awards ceremony in 1982

Ceremony for the 5th Hundred Flowers Awards was held in 1982, Beijing.

== Awards ==
=== Best Film ===
Winner	Winning film	Nominees
N/A	In Laws; Longing for Home; The White Snake	N/A

=== Best Actor ===
Winner	Winning film	Nominees
Wang Xingang	Intimate Friends	N/A

=== Best Actress ===
Winner	Winning film	Nominees
Li Xiuming	Xu Mao and His Daughters	N/A
