= Life (1984 film) =

1984 film

- Film poster
- Directed by: Wu Tianming
- Written by: Lu Yao
- Starring: Lijing Zhou
- Cinematography: Chen Wancai
- Music by: Xu Youfu
- Production company: Xi'an Film Studio
- Release date: 1 August 1984
- Running time: 152 minutes
- Country: China
- Language: Chinese

Life (Chinese: 人生; pinyin: Ren Sheng) is a 1984 Chinese drama film directed by Wu Tianming. The film was selected as the Chinese entry for the Best Foreign Language Film at the 57th Academy Awards, but was not accepted as a nominee.

== Cast ==
- Zhou Lijing as Gao Jia-lin
- Wu Yufang as Liu Qiao-zhen
- Gao Baocheng as Grandpa De-shun
- Bai Xue as Qiao Ling

== See also ==
- List of submissions to the 57th Academy Awards for Best Foreign Language Film
- List of Chinese submissions for the Academy Award for Best Foreign Language Film
