= The Herdsman =

- Film poster
- Traditional Chinese: 牧馬人
- Simplified Chinese: 牧马人
- Hanyu Pinyin: Mù Mǎ Rén
- Directed by: Xie Jin; Huang Shuqin
- Screenplay by: Li Zhun; Zhang Xianliang
- Based on: Ling Yu Rou by Zhang Xianliang
- Produced by: Bi Li-kui
- Starring: Liu Qiong; Zhu Shimao; Cong Shan; Niu Ben
- Cinematography: Zhu Yongde; Zhang Yongzheng; Xu Qi
- Edited by: Zhou Dingwen
- Music by: Zhun Huang
- Production company: Shanghai Film Studio
- Release date: 1982
- Running time: 106 minutes
- Country: China
- Language: Mandarin

The Herdsman (simplified Chinese: 牧马人; traditional Chinese: 牧馬人; pinyin: Mù Mǎ Rén) is a 1982 Chinese film about the life of a herdsman in western China from 1950s through the Cultural Revolution, and his reunion with his father from America. It was produced by the Shanghai Film Studio and directed by Xie Jin, starring Zhu Shimao. It is based on a novel by Zhang Xianliang.

== Plot ==
In autumn of 1980, an elderly Chinese American entrepreneur, Xu Jingyou ( Liu Qiong), returns to China, and finds his son, Xu Lingjun ( Zhu Shimao), a herdsman working in Chilechuan Ranch in northwestern China. The father wants to take his son to the United States to inherit his assets. However, the junior Xu is very distant with his father. More than 30 years ago, the father had abandoned his wife and son to do business in America. His mother died of disease and Xu becomes an orphan. After graduating from high school, Xu became a teacher. In 1957, he was classified as a "rightist" and sent to work in a ranch in the underdeveloped northwest. In 1962, when the labor penalty was terminated, Xu stayed at the ranch as a herdsman. Due to despair, Xu even attempted to commit suicide. But his fellow ranchers, especially Grandpa and Grandma Dong and Guo Zi, give him the courage and strength to carry on. During Cultural Revolution, Guo Zi and other ranchers protect him from political persecution. In 1972, Xu marries Li Xiuzhi, a village girl who had fled the famine in Sichuan. They give birth to a son, Little Qingqing, and the family lived a carefree life. Xu was rehabilitated in 1979 and returned to his post as a teacher. In the evening when Xu meets his father at the Peking Restaurant, his heart is uneasy. He recalls his past at the ranch and his wife's trust in his returning, which consolidates his decision to stay in China. The senior Xu finally understands his son, and the two resume their kinship. After sending his father home, Xu returns to the ranch and to his friends and family.

== Reception ==
The Herdsman won Best Supporting Actor ( Niu Ben) and Best Editing ( Zhou Dingwen) in 1983 at the 3rd Golden Rooster Awards. It also won Best Picture and Best Supporting Actor ( Niu Ben) at the 6th Hundred Flowers Awards. The film was screened in the Un Certain Regard section at the 1983 Cannes Film Festival.
