= Golden Rooster Award for Best Writing =

Annual Chinese film award

Golden Rooster Award for Best Writing (中国电影金鸡奖最佳编剧) is the main category of Competition of Golden Rooster Awards, awarding to screenplay writer.

== Award Winners & Nominees ==
=== 1980s ===
Year	Winner and nominees (English)	Winner and nominees (Chinese)	English title	Original title
1981	Ye Nan	叶楠	Evening Rain	巴山夜雨
1981	Lu Yanzhou	鲁彦周	Legend of Tianyun Mountain	天云山传奇
1982	Zhang Xuan	张铉	Corner Left Unnoticed by Love	被爱情遗忘的角落
1982	Xin Xianling	辛显令	In-Laws	喜盈门
1983	N/A			
1983	Chen Rong	谌容	At the Middle Age	人到中年
1984	N/A			
1984	Lu Yanzhou	鲁彦周	Liao Zhongkai	廖仲恺
1985	Li Zhun/Li Cunbao	李准、李存葆	Wreaths at the Foot of the Mountain	高山下的花环
1985	Peng Mingyan/Bi Jianchang	彭名燕、毕鉴昌	The Girl From Huangshan Mountain	黄山来的姑娘
1986	Cao Yu/Wan Fang	曹禺、万芳	Sunrise	日出
1986	Yan Xushu/Zhu Zi	颜学恕、竹子	Wild Mountains	野山
1986	Zhang Zeming	张泽鸣	Jue Xiang	绝响
1987	Tian Junli/Fei Linjun	田军利、费林军	The Battle of Taierzhuang	血战台儿庄
1987	Ah Cheng/Xie Jin	阿城、谢晋	Hibiscus Town	芙蓉镇
1987	Liu Guoqing	柳国庆	T Province in 84 & 8	T省的八四、八五年
1988	Song Guoxun/Li Ziyu/Huang Shuqin	宋国勋、李子羽、黄蜀芹	Ren Gui Qing	人鬼情
1988	Zheng Yi	郑义	Old Well	老井
1989	N/A			
1989	Tian Junli/Zhai Junjie	田军利、翟俊杰	The Republic will Never Forget	共和国不会忘记
1989	Xu Yali	徐亚力	Wild Snow	荒雪

=== 1990s ===
Year	Winner and nominees (English)	Winner and nominees (Chinese)	English title	Original title
1990	Zhang Tianmin/Zhang Xiaotian/Liu Xing/Guo Chen	张天民、张笑天、刘星、郭晨	Founding Ceremony	开国大典
1991	N/A			
1991	Wei Ren	魏人	Dragon Year Cops	龙年警官
1991	Zheng Xiaolong/Feng Xiaogang	郑晓龙、冯小刚	Bitter Experience Fervor	遭遇激情
1991	Zheng Zhenhuan	郑振环	Tian Bian You Yi Cu Sheng Huo	天边有一簇圣火
1992	Huang Yazhou/Wang Tianyun	黄亚洲、汪天云	Kai Tian Pi Di	开天辟地
1992	Jiang Yi	姜一	Spring Festival	过年
1992	Shi Chao/Wang Jun/Li Pingfen	史超、王军、李平分	Decisive Engagement: The Liaoxi-Shenyang Campaign	大决战
1993	Wang Xingdong	王兴东	Jiang Zhuying	蒋筑英
1993	Feng Xiaogang/Zheng Xiaolong	冯小刚、郑晓龙	After Separation	大撒把
1994	Ju Sheng/Liu Xinglong/Bu Yangui	桔生、刘醒龙、卜炎贵	Country Teachers	凤凰琴
1994	Wang Tianyun/Lu Shoujun	汪天云、陆寿钧	The First Temptation	第一诱惑
1995	Bi Bicheng/Fan Yuan	毕必成、范元	The Accused Uncle Shangang	被告山杠爷
1995	Huang Xin/Sun Yian	黄欣、孙毅安	Back to Back, Face to Face	背靠背，脸对脸
1996	N/A			
1996	Fan Yuan/Liu Xiaoshuang	范元、刘晓双	Wu Er Ge Qing Shen	吴二哥请神
1996	Su Xiaowei	苏小卫	Winner	赢家
1997	Wang Xingdong	王兴东	The Days Without Lei Feng	离开雷锋的日子
1997	Yao Yuan/Wang Yubin/Wang Suhong/Wei Lian/Li Baoling	姚远、王玉彬、王苏红、韦廉、李宝玲	Da Zhuan Zhe	大转折
1997	Zhu Sujin/Ni Zhen/Zong Fuxian/Mai Tianshu	朱苏进、倪震、宗福先、麦天枢	Opium War	鸦片战争
1998	Lu Zhuguo	陆柱国	The Liberation of Southwest China	大进军——席卷大西南
1998	Ma Weijun	马卫军	Settlement	安居
1998	Zhao Dongling	赵冬苓	Passion Defense	激情辩护
1999	Cao Wenxuan	曹文轩	The Grass House	草房子
1999	Su Xiaowei	苏小卫	Postmen in the Mountains	那山那人那狗

=== 2000s ===
Year	Winner and nominees (English)	Winner and nominees (Chinese)	English title	Original title
2000	He Zizhuang/Song Jigao	贺子壮、宋继高	Final Decision	生死抉择
2001	Wang Xiaotang/Wang Chen	王晓棠、王宸	Fragrant Vows	芬芳誓言
2002	Su Xiaowei	苏小卫	Life Show	生活秀
2002	Li Wei	李唯	Pretty Big Feet	美丽的大脚
2003	Su Xiaowei	苏小卫	Nuan	暖
2003	Feng Hua/Xu Geng	冯华、徐耿	Law of Romance	警察有约
2003	Liu Jianwei	柳建伟	Jing Tao Hai Lang	惊涛骇浪
2003	Meng Jiazong	孟家宗	When Ruoma Was Seventee	诺玛的十七岁
2004	Zhao Dongling	赵冬苓	On the Way to School	上学路上
2004	Peng Xiaolian	彭小莲	Shanghai Story	美丽上海
2005	Liu Heng	刘恒	Zhang Side	张思德
2005	Lu Chuan	陆川	Kekexili: Mountain Patrol	可可西里
2005	Lu Zhuguo	陆柱国	On the Mountain of Tai Hang	太行山上
2005	Ma Liwen	马俪文	You and Me	我们俩
2006-2007	Tang Lai/Zhang Sitao/Zhang Chi/Hu Kun	唐灏、张思涛、张弛、胡坤	Tokyo Trial	东京审判
2006-2007	Chen Daming	陈大明	One Foot Off The Ground	鸡犬不宁
2006-2007	Yu Zhong	俞钟	A Postman OF Paradise	香巴拉信使
2006-2007	Zou Jingzhi	邹静之	Riding Alone for Thousands of Miles	千里走单骑
2006-2007	Zheng Hongzhi	郑宏志	The Forest Ranger	天狗
2008-2009	Jiang Haiyang/Gu Bai/Zong Fuxian	江海洋、谷白、宗福先	Turning Point 1977	高考
2008-2009	Cheng Xiaoling	程晓玲	The Clear Water	清水的故事
2008-2009	Li Qiang	李樯	And the Spring Comes	李樯
2008-2009	Liu Heng	刘恒	Assembly	集结号
2008-2009	Shu Ping	述评	A Tale of Two Donkeys	走着瞧
2008-2009	Su Xiaowei	苏小卫	Six Sisters	沂蒙六姐妹上学

=== 2010s ===
Year	Winner and nominees (English)	Winner and nominees (Chinese)	English title	Original title
2010-2011	Cheng Xiaoling	程晓玲	The Spectacular Theatre	岁岁清明
2010-2011	Liu Jianwei/Liu Hongwei/Wang Qiang/Zhao Junfang/Liang Shuibao	柳建伟、刘宏伟、王强、赵俊防、梁水宝	Feitian	飞天
2010-2011	Su Xiaowei	苏小卫	Aftershock	唐山大地震
2010-2011	Xing Yuanping	邢原平	The Old Village	老寨
2010-2011	Yang Xiaoyan/Wang Jing	杨筱燕、王竞	Hai Zi Na Xie Shi Er	孩子那些事儿
2010-2011	Zhang Meng	张猛	The Piano in a Factory	钢的琴
2012-2013	Huang Hong/Wang Jinming		Fallen City	
2012-2013	Tian Yunzhang/Jia Yunzhang		The Story of Zhou Enlai	
2012-2013	Qu Jiangtao		A Grandson from America	
2012-2013	Zhou Zhiyong/Zhang Ji/Lin Aihua		American Dreams in China	
2012-2013	Hu Yonghong		My Running Shadow	
2014-2015	Li Qiang		The Golden Era	
2014-2015	A Lai		Phurbu & Tenzin	
2014-2015	Qu Jiangtao		A Grandson from America	
2014-2015	Xing Yuanping/Jia Ru		Tu Di Zhi	
2014-2015	Zhang Ji		Dearest	
2014-2015	Zhao Baohua		We Will Make It Right	
2016-2017	Guan Hu, Dong Runnian		Mr. Six	
2016-2017	Liu Zhenyun		I Am Not Madame Bovary	
2016-2017	Li Baoluo		Bangzi Melody	
2016-2017	Huang Dan, Feng Mengyao, Liang Shuang		Relocate	
2018-2019	Wang Xiaoshuai, Ah Mei	阿美、王小帅	So Long, My Son	地久天长
2018-2019	Wen Muye, Han Jianü, Zhong Wei	韩家女、锺伟、文牧野	Dying to Survive	我不是药神
2018-2019	Teng Congcong	滕丛丛	Send Me to the Clouds	送我上青云
2018-2019	Zou Jingzhi	邹静之	Enter the Forbidden City	进京城
2018-2019	Yuan Yuan, He Yuming, Pan Wei, An Zhen, Liu Ruoying	袁媛、何昕明、潘彧、安巍、刘若英	Us and Them	后来的我们
2018-2019	Bao Jingjing	鲍晶晶	Our Shining Days	闪光少女

=== 2020s ===
Year	Winner and nominees (English)	English title	Original title
2020	Zhang Ji	Leap	夺冠
2020	Yang Weiwei, Zhai Pei, Li Peng, Fan Kaihua, Qin Yuqian, Lei Sheng	Sheep Without a Shepherd	误杀
2020	Lin Yongchen, Li Yuan, Xu Yimeng	Better Days	少年的你
2020	Zhou Shen, Liu Lu	Almost a Comedy	半个喜剧
2021	Yu Xi, Huang Xin, Zhao Ningyu	1921	1921
2021	Zhang Li	Fish Under the Ice	冰下的鱼
2021	Chen Li, Ding Han, Zhao Zhe'en	Island Keeper	守岛人
2021	Guan Hu, Wu Bing, Zhang Ke, Jing Yu	The Pioneer	革命者
2021	Gao Mantang, Li Wei	My Father, Jiao Yulu	我的父亲焦裕禄
2021	Mei Duo, Dembadaji, Ze Rangsa	Gone With the Wind	随风飘散
2022	Shao Yihui	Myth of Love	爱情神话
2022	Lan Xiaolong, Huang Xin	The Battle at Lake Changjin	长津湖
2022	Wang Xingdong	A Man of the People	邓小平小道
2022	Zhang Lü	Yanagawa	漫长的告白
2022	Zhou Chucen, Xiu Mengdi, Wen Muye, Han Xiaohan, Zhong Wei	Nice View	奇迹·笨小孩
2023	Dashan Kong, Yitong Wang	Journey to the West	宇宙探索编辑部
2023	Ran Ping, Ran Jianan, Wuershan, Cao Sheng	Creation of the Gods I: Kingdom of Storms	封神第一部：朝歌风云
2023	Jack Ng, Jay Cheung, Terry Lam	A Guilty Conscience	毒舌律师
2023	Kang Chunlei and Wei Shujun	Stories of Yong'an Town	永安镇故事集
2023	Cheng Er	Hidden Blade	无名
2024	Han Yan/ Li Fu	Viva La Vida	我们一起摇太阳
2024	Pema Tseden	Snow Leopard	雪豹
2024	Li Meng/ Zhang Yimou	Article 20	第二十条
2024	Zhang Ji	Endless Journey	三大队
2024	Dong Runnian/ Ying Luojia	Johnny Keep Walking!	年会不能停！
2024	Han Yan/ Li Fu	Viva La Vida	我们一起摇太阳
2024	Pema Tseden	Snow Leopard	雪豹
2024	Li Meng/ Zhang Yimou	Article 20	第二十条
2024	Zhang Ji	Endless Journey	三大队
2024	Dong Runnian/ Ying Luojia	Johnny Keep Walking!	年会不能停！
2025	Anselm Chan, Cheng Wai-kei	The Last Dance	破·地狱
2025	Chen Kaige, Zhang Ke	The Volunteers: The Battle of Life and Death	志愿军：存亡之战
2025	Shao Yihui	Her Story	好东西
2025	Lin Jianjie	Brief History of a Family	家庭简史
2025	You Xiaoying	Big World	小小的我
