= 37th Golden Rooster Awards =

Chinese film awards

- Official poster
- Awarded for: Excellence in cinematic achievements
- Announced on: Nominations: October 27, 2024
- Presented on: November 16, 2024
- Site: Xiamen International Conference & Exhibition Center; Xiamen, Fujian, China
- Hosted by: Lan Yu; Tong Dawei
- Organized by: China Film Association; Xiamen Municipal People's Government

Highlights
- Best Feature Film: Article 20
- Special Jury Prize: The Volunteers: To the War
- Best Direction: Chen Kaige; The Volunteers: To the War
- Best Actor: Lei Jiayin; Article 20
- Best Actress: Li Gengxi; Viva La Vida
- Best Supporting Actor: Wang Xiao; Endless Journey
- Best Supporting Actress: Liu Dan; Gone with the Boat
- Lifetime achievement: Xu Guangyao; Xie Fei

Television coverage
- Network: CCTV

37th Golden Rooster Awards
- Simplified Chinese: 第37届中国电影金鸡奖
- Traditional Chinese: 第37屆中國電影金雞獎
Transcriptions
Standard Mandarin
- Hanyu Pinyin: Dì Sānshīqī Jiè Zhōngguó Diànyǐng Jīnjījiǎng

The 37th Golden Rooster Awards ceremony (Chinese: 第37届中国电影金鸡奖) took place on 16 November 2024, in Xiamen, Fujian.

Lei Jiayin won Best Actor for his performance in Article 20, which won the best feature film award in the gala. The best actress award went to Li Gengxi, in recognition for her performance in Viva La Vida.

== Awards ==
=== Feature awards ===
Nominees and winners (winners denoted in bold)

Best Picture	Best Low-budget Feature
**Article 20**; Endless Journey; Johnny Keep Walking!; Viva La Vida; One and Only; The Volunteers: To the War	**Another Day of Hope**; Has man a Future; Gone with the Boat; The Midsummer's Voice; Lost Love
Best Children's Film	Best Foreign Language Film
**Football on the Roof**; Day Dreaming; A Good Place by the River; Gift of Brave	**Oppenheimer**; Mother's Instinct; Dune: Part Two; Kim's Video; The Challenge
Best Drama Film	Best Documentary/Educational Film
**Madam Anguo**; Jiujiangkou; Loyal and Righteous; Sister Ada; Tiemenguan	**The Sinking of the Lisbon Maru**; A Decade of Belt and Road; The Yangtze River; Invisible Summit; Kangxi and Louis XIV
Best Art/Animation Film	Special Jury Prize
**Dragonkeeper**; Door-god; The Umbrella Fairy; Into The Mortal World; Boonie Bears:Time Twist	**The Volunteers: To the War**

=== Individual awards ===
Best Director	Best Directorial Debut
**Chen Kaige – The Volunteers: To the War**; Da Peng – One and Only; Shen Ao – No More Bets; Han Yan – Viva La Vida; Dai Mo – Endless Journey	**Zhang Yudi – The Midsummer's Voice**; Fei Yu – Football on the Roof; Liu Taifeng – Another Day of Hope; Chen Xiaoyu – Gone with the Boat; Jia Shengfeng – Lost Love
Best Actor	Best Actress
**Lei Jiayin – Article 20 as Han Ming**; Wang Yibo – One and Only as Chen Shuo; Shen Teng – Pegasus 2 as Zhang Chi; Bowie Lam – In Broad Daylight as Cheung Kim-Wah; Jinpa – Snow Leopard as Eldest son; Peng Yuchang – Viva La Vida as Lü Tu	**Li Gengxi – Viva La Vida as Ling Min**; Ma Li – Article 20 as Li Maojuan; Japal Tso – Life of Luosang as Dolma; Zhang Zifeng – I Love You to the Moon and Back as Lin Xiushan; Zhou Meijun – The Midsummer's Voice as Shi Jiahui; Ge Zhaomei – Gone with the Boat as Zhou Jin
Best Supporting Actor	Best Supporting Actress
**Wang Xiao – Endless Journey as Ma Zhenkun**; Wang Chuanjun – No More Bets as Lu Bingkun; Bai Ke – Johnny Keep Walking! as Ma Jie; Fan Chengcheng – Pegasus 2 as Li Xiaohai; Lobsang Chompel – Snow Leopard as Father	**Liu Dan – Gone with the Boat as Su Nianzhen**; Yue Hong – G for Gap as Jiang Meiling; Zhao Liying – Article 20 as Hao Xiuping; Xu Fan – Viva La Vida as Tao Yi; Guo Yuke – Another Day of Hope as Xu Xiaoxia
Best Writing	Best Editing
**Han Yan/ Li Fu – Viva La Vida**; Pema Tseden – Snow Leopard; Li Meng/ Zhang Yimou – Article 20; Zhang Ji – Endless Journey; Dong Runnian/ Ying Luojia – Johnny Keep Walking!	**Zhou Xiaolin/ Shen Ao – No More Bets**; Li Dianshi – The Volunteers: To the War; Li Yakun – Viva La Vida; Huangzeng Hongzhan – Johnny Keep Walking!; Tu Yiran/ Zhang Yibo – One and Only
Best Cinematography	Best Art Direction
**Qian Rui/ Qian Tiantian – One and Only**; Wang Tianxing – No More Bets; Bai Yuxia – Pegasus 2; Zhao Fei – The Volunteers: To the War; Yan Daiyao – Another Day of Hope	**Zhao Xuehao – Pegasus 2**; Li Anran – No More Bets; Lu Wei – The Volunteers: To the War; Lin Mu – Article 20; Xiong Fei – Football on the Roof
Best Music	Best Sound Recording
**Peng Fei – Endless Journey**; Wang Zhiyi – The Volunteers: To the War; Ji Ran/ Wang Nana – Viva La Vida; Zhao Lin – Article 20; Guo Haowei – Football on the Roof	**Wang Gang/ Liu Xiaosha – Pegasus 2**; Wang Danrong – The Volunteers: To the War; Li Tao – Endless Journey; Lin Siyu – No More Bets; DukarTserang – Snow Leopard
Lifetime Achievement
**Xu Guangyao**; **Xie Fei**
