= 36th Golden Rooster Awards =

Chinese film awards

- Official poster
- Awarded for: Excellence in cinematic achievements
- Announced on: Nominations: October 15, 2023
- Presented on: November 4, 2023
- Site: Xiamen International Conference & Exhibition Center; Xiamen, China
- Hosted by: Lan Yu; Zhang Xiaofei; Alec Su; Huang Xuan
- Organized by: China Film Association; China Federation of Literary and Art Circles; Xiamen Municipal People's Government; 1905.com
- Official website: Golden Rooster Awards

Highlights
- Best Film: Drama: The Lady of Qiao
- Best Feature Film: Creation of the Gods I: Kingdom of Storms
- Special Jury Prize: The Wandering Earth 2
- Best Direction: Cheng Er; Hidden Blade
- Best Actor: Tony Leung; Hidden Blade
- Best Actress: He Saifei; Off the Stage
- Best Supporting Actor: Li Xuejian; Creation of the Gods I: Kingdom of Storms
- Best Supporting Actress: Huang Miyi; Ripples of Life
- Lifetime achievement: Shichang Da
- Most nominations: 9 – Creation of the Gods I: Kingdom of Storms

Television coverage
- Network: CCTV

The 36th Golden Rooster Awards ceremony (Chinese: 第36届中国电影金鸡奖) took place on 4 November 2023, in Xiamen, Fujian. During the gala, the China Film Association presented Golden Rooster Awards honouring Chinese language films released from July 1, 2022, to June 30, 2023. The ceremony, televised in mainland China by CCTV, was hosted by Lan Yu, Zhang Xiaofei, Alec Su and Huang Xuan.

Creation of the Gods I: Kingdom of Storms won three awards, including Best Picture. Other winners included Hidden Blade with three awards, The Wandering Earth 2 with two, and Back to Tibet, Born to Fly, Chang'an, Home Coming, Journey to the West, Like Father and Son, Notre-Dame on Fire, Off the Stage, Pathfinder, Ripples of Life, Snow Leopard and Her Friends, and The Lady of Qiao with one.

== Winners and nominees ==
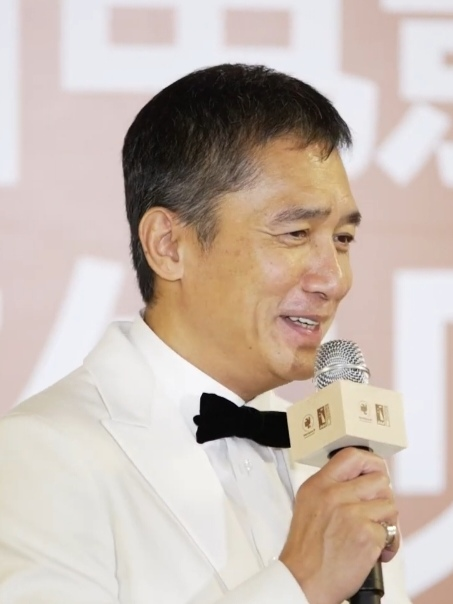
Tony Leung Chiu-wai, winner of Best Actor award

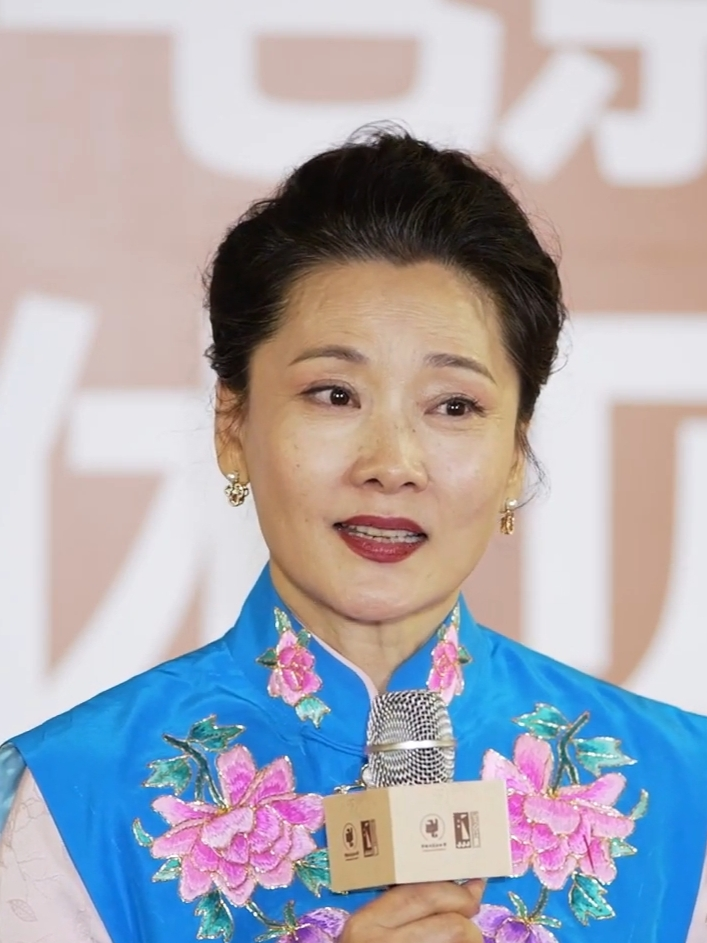
He Saifei, winner of Best Actress award

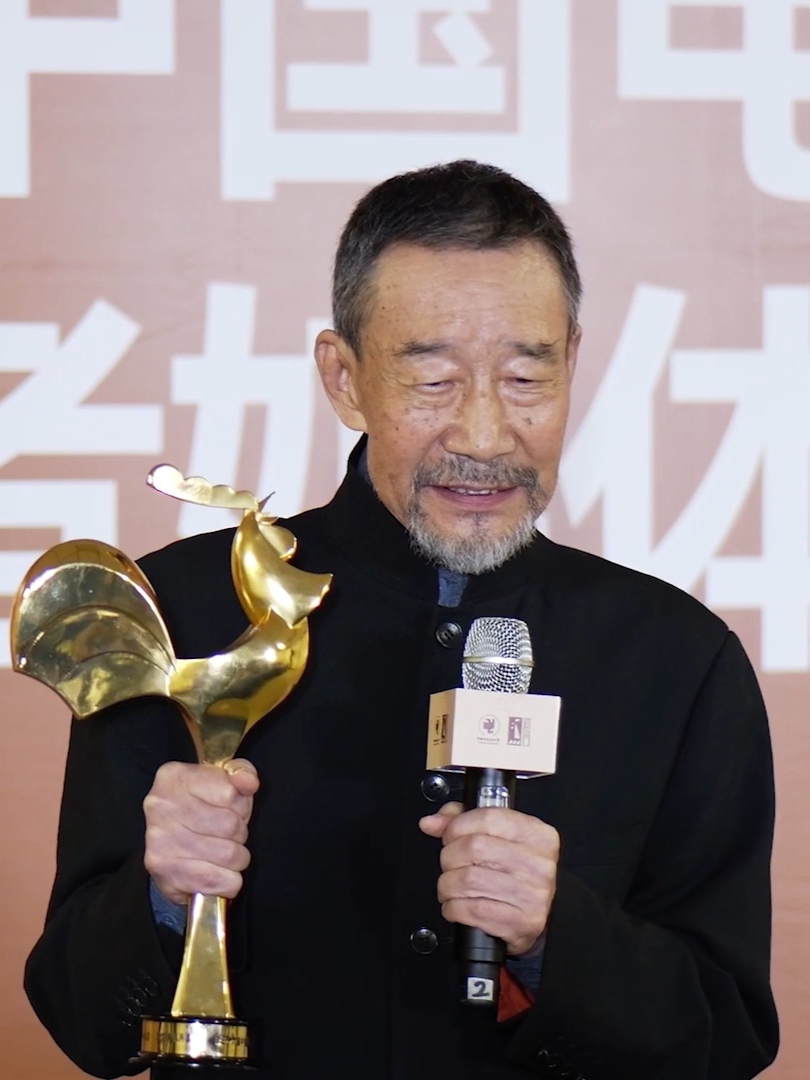
Li Xuejian, winner of Best Supporting Actor award

The nominations were announced on 15 October 2023. Creation of the Gods I: Kingdom of Storms received 9 nominations and Hidden Blade received 8 nominations.

Nominees and winners (winners denoted in bold)

=== Feature awards ===
Best Picture	Best Low-budget Feature
**Creation of the Gods I: Kingdom of Storms**; Hidden Blade; Ping Pong: The Triumph; Born to Fly; A Guilty Conscience; The Wandering Earth 2	**Back to Tibet**; Ripples of Life; Journey to the West; Off the Stage; Sunflowers in the Evening
Best Children's Film	Best Foreign Language Film
**Like Father and Son**; Little Horse Whip; Send Crane A Thousand Miles Away; Jiang Mi'er	**Notre-Dame on Fire** – (France, Italy); A Man Called Otto – (USA); Memoria – (Colombia, Thailand); The Son – (UK); Fall – (US, UK)
Best Drama Film	Best Documentary/Educational Film
**The Lady of Qiao**; The Story of Handan; Guoding Soul; The Legend of Mail; Prince Rui and Concubine Zhuang	**Snow Leopard and Her Friends**; Music without Sound; Not an Island; Beijing 2022; Through the Beacon Fire
Best Art/Animation Film	Special Jury Prize
**Chang'an**; Four Seasons; Snowy Boy	**The Wandering Earth 2**

=== Individual awards ===
Best Director	Best Directorial Debut
**Cheng Er for Hidden Blade**; Wuershan for Creation of the Gods I: Kingdom of Storms; Deng Chao, Yu Baimei for Ping Pong: The Triumph; Chen Guoxing, Lahuajia for Back to Tibet; Wei Shujun for Ripples of Life	**Liu Xiaoshi – Born to Fly**; Dashan Kong – Journey to the West; Bai Zhiqiang – Like Father and Son; Jack Ng – A Guilty Conscience
Best Actor	Best Actress
**Tony Leung Chiu-wai – Hidden Blade as Mr. He**; Huang Bo – Study Dad as Lei Dali; Song Yang – Back to Tibet as Lao Kong; Hui Wangjun – The Like Father and Son as Gou Ren; Yang Haoyu – Journey to the West as Tang Zhijun	**He Saifei – Off the Stage as teacher Qi**; Wai Ying-hung – Love Never Ends as Li Huiru; Yan Ni – Heart's Motive as Jin Ximei; Yin Tao – Home Coming as Bai Hua; Huang Yao – The Shadowless Tower as Ouyang Wenhui
Best Supporting Actor	Best Supporting Actress
**Li Xuejian – Creation of the Gods I: Kingdom of Storms as Ji Chang**; Hu Jun – Born to Fly as Zhang Ting; Kalsang Jinpa – Back to Tibet as Jiumei; Lei Jiayin – Full River Red as Qin Hui; Wang Yibo – Hidden Blade as Mr. Ye	**Huang Miyi – Ripples of Life as Xiao Gu**; Cecilia Yip – Love Never Ends as Zhao Huanxin; Wan Qian – Study Dad as Huo's sister-in-law; Wang Shengdi – Keep You Safe as Wei Moli; Yuan Quan – Creation of the Gods I: Kingdom of Storms as Queen Jiang
Best Writing	Best Editing
**Dashan Kong, Yitong Wang – Journey to the West** (original); Ran Ping, Ran Jianan, Wuershan, Cao Sheng – Creation of the Gods I: Kingdom of Storms (Screenwriting and Creation Collective) (Adaptation); Jack Ng, Jay Cheung, Terry Lam – A Guilty Conscience (original); Kang Chunlei and Wei Shujun – Stories of Yong'an Town (original); Cheng Er - Hidden Blade (original)	**Cheng Er – Hidden Blade**; Shi Mingming – Like Father and Son; Xiao Yang, Li Ruiliang, Wei Yong – Born to Fly; Xi Dorje – Back to Tibet; Huang Shuo, Zhang Jiahui, Du Yuan – Creation of the Gods I: Kingdom of Storms
Best Cinematography	Best Art Direction
**Wang Yu – Creation of the Gods I: Kingdom of Storms**; Piao Songri – The Shadowless Tower; Du Bin – Like Father and Son; Jin Guirong – Sunflowers in the Evening; Cai Tao, Liao Hui – Hidden Blade	**Li Miao's – Home Coming**; Timmy Yip – Creation of the Gods I: Kingdom of Storms; Sun Li – Hidden Blade; Gao Ang – The Wandering Earth 2; Huo Tingxiao – Ping Pong: The Triumph
Best Music	Best Sound Recording
**Lao Zai – Pathfinder**; Li Heng – Home Coming; Huwandeko Jason – Little Riding Whip; Han Hong – Full River Red; Liao Tongchen, Ou Leheng, Zhang Jianren – A Guilty Conscience; Derge Cairang – Back to Tibet	**Wang Danrong, Zhu Yanfeng – The Wandering Earth 2**; Wang Yanwei – Born to Fly; Feng Yanming, Lin Xuelin – Ping Pong: The Triumph; Li Anlei – Never Say Never; Yang Jiang, Zhao Nan – Creation of the Gods I: Kingdom of Storms
Lifetime Achievement
**Shichang Da**

== Films with multiple nominations ==
The following films received multiple nominations:

Films	Nominations	Nominated for
Creation of the Gods I: Kingdom of Storms	9	Best Feature Film Award; Best Screenplay Award; Best Director Award; Best Supporting Actor Award; Best Supporting Actress Award; Best Cinematography Award; Best Sound Recording Award; Best Art Award; Best Editing Award
Hidden Blade	8	Best Feature Film Award; Best Screenplay Award; Best Director Award; Best Actor Award; Best Supporting Actor Award; Best Cinematography Award; Best Art Award; Best Editing Award
Back to Tibet	6	Best Small and Medium Budget Feature Film Award; Best Director Award; Best Actor Award; Best Supporting Actor Award; Best Music Award; Best Editing Award
Born to Fly	5	Best Feature Film; Best Directorial Debut; Best Supporting Actor; Best Sound Recording; Best Editing
Like Father and Son	5	Best Children's Film Award; Best Director's Debut Award; Best Actor Award; Best Cinematography Award; Best Editing Award
