= A Little Red Flower =

2020 Chinese film by Han Yan

- Theatrical release poster
- Traditional Chinese: 送你一朵小紅花
- Simplified Chinese: 送你一朵小红花
- Literal meaning: Give You A Little Red Flower
- Hanyu Pinyin: sòng nǐ yī duǒ xiǎo hónghuā
- Directed by: Han Yan
- Written by: Jinliang Han; Han Yan; Han Li; Jia Jia Wei; Yu Yonggan
- Produced by: Yin Lu; Lian Ray
- Starring: Jackson Yee; Liu Haocun; Zhu Yuanyuan; Gao Yalin; Xia Yu; Yue Yunpeng
- Cinematography: Rui Zhong
- Edited by: Zhu Lin
- Music by: Zhao Yingjun
- Production company: Lian Ray Pictures
- Distributed by: HG Entertainment
- Release date: December 31, 2020
- Running time: 122 minutes
- Country: China
- Language: Mandarin
- Box office: $220.5 million

A Little Red Flower (Chinese: 送你一朵小红花) is a 2020 Chinese drama film directed by Han Yan from a screenplay he co-wrote with Jinliang Han, Han Li, Jia Jia Wei, and Yu Yonggan. It stars Jackson Yee as Wei Yihang, a teenager who has been in remission following a brain tumor operation years prior, and Liu Haocun as a fellow patient named Ma Xiaoyuan.

The idea for the film was conceived when Yan was working on Go Away Mr. Tumor (2015), a film about cancer patient and comic book artist Xiong Dun. The film sparked controversy over its similar plot to the American film The Fault in Our Stars (2014). Unveiled documents revealed that a canceled Chinese remake of the American film had been in development and that A Little Red Flower could have potentially derived from it with no connections or credit to the original source. However, Yan has said that parts of the film were actually inspired by real-life events that he witnessed himself.

A Little Red Flower premiered on December 31, 2020, and grossed $216 million, setting multiple box-office records in China and becoming the ninth highest-grossing films of 2020.

== Plot ==
Wei Yihang, a cynical and reclusive teenager, has been in remission since his brain tumor operation two years ago. After meeting fellow brain tumor patient Ma Xiaoyuan, Wei begins to open up socially, as the pair share various imaginary travel adventures and try to live life as "ordinary people" which they are unable to be because of their respective illnesses.

At the same time, Wei begins forming a deeper understanding and appreciation of his family, who have unconditionally supported him during his medical difficulties. At one point, Wei sees his grandmother volunteering to sell her house to fund his medical expenses, with his uncles and aunts saying they would do the same, sending his father into tears.

Soon after, Wei is allowed to travel to a lake in Qinghai that he once saw in a hallucination where he was playing with an unknown girl. Ma and Wei set off their journey together. However, Ma faints on the train and is sent to the hospital, where she is given a grim prognosis.

Wei accompanies and cares for Ma during her final days, including shaving his head and conjuring a "potion of no return". During this time, Wei and his mother discuss the difficult topic of death, with Wei's parents recording and sending him a video depicting their life in case of Wei's death. Wei cries as he watches their video, now comforted by the fact that his parents will be able to carry forward even if he is no longer around.

After Ma dies, Wei packs up her belongings. One year later, Wei finishes his classes in college. He then makes a trip to Qinghai by himself, where he finally arrives at the lake he frequently hallucinates. There, Wei sees images of himself with Ma playing in the waters. It occurs to him that those images are not hallucinations, but life in a parallel universe where he, Ma, and all his fellow cancer friends are healthy and living ordinary lives.

== Cast ==
- Jackson Yee as Wei Yihang
- Liu Haocun as Ma Xiaoyuan
- Zhu Yuanyuan as Tao Hui
- Gao Yalin as Wei Jiang
- Xia Yu as Lao Ma
- Yue Yunpeng as Wu Xiaomei

== Production ==
"I put all my views on life over the past few years into this movie. As I grow older, I find that being alive is not easy. Everyone has exhausted everything to live, let alone those who are sick and families with patients. I hope everyone can feel love and warmth through this movie, don't complain about life, and cherish every minute and every second. To live well is a gift from heaven."

— Director Han Yan

A Little Red Flower was directed and co-written by Han Yan, who had previously worked on Go Away Mr. Tumor, a comedy-drama about the life of Xiong Dun, a comic book artist who became famous after creating a popular webcomic shortly after being diagnosed with cancer. As that film tackled a person's individual fight against cancer, Han wanted A Little Red Flower to show how entire families struggled with the same problem, stating that the film was "intended as a spiritual guide and therapeutic support for the audience", and that it was the second part of his "Trilogy of Life".

During production, Han worked with film colorist Hua Cheng to give the film a "natural look", eventually deciding to use the DaVinci Resolve 17 tool to give color to the film and a high quality look. Produced by Yin Lu and Lian Ray, A Little Red Flower began filming on June 12, 2020, in the Shinan District of the city of Qingdao. To prepare for his role, Jackson Yee went to Qingdao one month prior to filming, lost weight in an attempt to become "closer to the character's morbid setting", began searching for information about brain cancer, and consulted a doctor to learn about patients affected by it.

== Reception ==
=== Box office ===
A Little Red Flower was theatrically released in China on December 31, 2020. It grossed US$39 million on its first day and $80.1 million over its three-day-opening weekend, breaking several New Year's Day's box-office records in the country. By its second weekend, the film had grossed $160 million nationwide, becoming the highest-grossing film of 2020, in front of the American releases of Soul and Wonder Woman 1984. It made $11.7 million in its third weekend, and $7 million in its fourth. By its fifth and final sixth weekend, A Little Red Flower managed to gross over $200 million, and was still ahead of both American films, but fell behind on the weekly earnings of Big Red Envelope and Shock Wave 2. The following weekend, the film was overtaken from its number one spot by the $398 million three-day opening weekend record set by Detective Chinatown 3.

=== Plagiarism accusation ===
Following its release, several filmgoers claimed that the premise of A Little Red Flower was similar to that of the 2014 film The Fault in Our Stars, which had been produced by the American company Fox 2000 Pictures, and had also never been theatrically released in China. The Hollywood Reporter, quoting user posts and comments from Douban, reported on January 13, 2021, that Fox had attempted to create a Chinese remake to The Fault in Our Stars in 2016, with the former president of Fox International Productions, Tomas Jegeus, confirming that a remake was indeed in development at the studio with Yin Lu and Han Yan producing, and Yu Yonggan writing the film's script.

Shortly after, two official film notices announced that the remake was in the works, but after the controversial acquisition of 21st Century Fox by Disney, which resulted in massive employee layoffs at both companies, created multiple distractions to Disney senior management and ultimately resulted in minimal financial return to shareholders, the studio decided to drop the film in 2018 to work on Dil Bechara, the Indian remake of The Fault in Our Stars. In 2018, a notice was released by the Film Administration for a project titled Hopeless in Love, which would be produced by HG Entertainment and Lian Ray Pictures, with a premise similar to the original remake that had been in development. In 2020, A Little Red Flower was released from the same production companies, and with Yin Lu producing, Yu Yonggan co-writing, and Han Yan directing, but with no credit or mentions to Fox. However, Han said that many of the scenes portrayed in the story were inspired by real-life events that he witnessed himself. One scene portrays how Wei Yihang orders a takeaway meal for a stranger who is walking in a daze on the street after losing his daughter to cancer, which he stated was in fact based on an incident he witnessed at the entrance of the Peking University Third Hospital in Beijing. Both Disney, who acquired Fox, and A Little Red Flower's co-producer Lian Ray have declined to comment on the matter.

=== Accolades ===
Award	Date of ceremony	Category	Recipient(s)	Result	Ref.
Golden Elm Flower Awards	January 6, 2021	Best New Performer	Liu Haocun	Won	
Huading Awards	August 12, 2021	Best Picture	A Little Red Flower	Nominated	
Huading Awards	August 12, 2021	Best Actor in a Motion Picture	Jackson Yee	Nominated	
Huading Awards	August 12, 2021	Best New Performer	Liu Haocun	Won	
Huading Awards	August 12, 2021	Best Supporting Actor	Yalin Gao	Won	
Huading Awards	August 12, 2021	Best Song	Zhao Yingjun	Nominated	
34th Golden Rooster Awards	December 30, 2021	Best Director	Han Yan	Nominated	
34th Golden Rooster Awards	December 30, 2021	Best Actor	Jackson Yee	Nominated	
34th Golden Rooster Awards	December 30, 2021	Best Actress	Liu Haocun	Nominated	
34th Golden Rooster Awards	December 30, 2021	Best Cinematography	Rui Zhong	Nominated	
