= Twenty Your Life On =

- Twenty Your Life On（zh：二十不惑）
- Genre: Urban, Inspirational, Coming-of-age
- Screenplay by: Zhang Wuju, Zhong Enshu, Han Santai, Lu Shisanfeng, Guo Sihan, Li Zhen, Li Muzi, Zhang Xiaotiao (jointly)
- Directed by: Li Zhi
- Starring: Guan Xiaotong; Jin Shijia; Niu Junfeng; Bu Guanjin; Li Gengxi; Dong Siyi
- Country of origin: China
- Original language: Mandarin Chinese
- No. of episodes: 80

Original release
- Release: 14 July – 7 August 2020

Twenty Your Life On (Chinese: 二十不惑) is a Chinese television drama directed by Li Zhi and produced by Shen Yan.

The first season premiered in 2020, starring Guan Xiaotong, Niu Junfeng, Bu Guanjin, Jin Shijia, Li Gengxi, Dong Siyi, and Wang Anyu.

The second season premiered in 2022, starring Guan Xiaotong, Bu Guanjin, Dong Siyi, Xu Mengjie, Xie Binbin, Li Junxian, Fei Qiming, Zhou Yiran, and Jin Shijia.

== Plot summary ==
=== Season 1 ===
The first season centers on the four girls—Liang Shuang, Jiang Xiaoguo, Duan Jiabao, and Luo Yan—on the brink of graduation. They confront numerous challenges involving love, friendship, family, and future career choices. During their time living together in the dormitory, they form strong bonds while navigating emotional conflicts, family secrets, and struggles with self-identity. The season concludes with their graduation and transition into independent adult life.

=== Season 2 ===
Set three years later, the second season follows the four as they enter the workforce and face increasingly complex pressures in their careers, relationships, and personal lives. Jiang Xiaoguo seeks self-discovery and love within the finance industry. Liang Shuang experiences career ups and downs and relationship changes before shifting toward entrepreneurship. Duan Jiabao takes on family responsibilities after her family falls into hardship and finds love. Luo Yan, feeling uncertain, chooses to pursue studies abroad. The addition of new character Ding Yixuan introduces fresh emotional storylines. Season two realistically portrays young adults' growth and perseverance in work and life, culminating in the four achieving success both professionally and personally. The series ends with a warm reunion and hopeful prospects for the future.
