= Golden Rooster Award for Best Director =

Chinese Film Awards

Golden Rooster Awards for Best Director
- Awarded for: Best Director of the year
- Country: China
- Presented by: China Film Association; China Federation of Literary and Art Circles; Xiamen Municipal People's Government; 1905.com
- First award: 1981
- Final award: 2023
- Winner (2023): Cheng Er for Hidden Blade
- Website: Golden Rooster Awards

Golden Rooster Award for Best Director (中国电影金鸡奖最佳导演) is the main category of Competition of Golden Rooster Awards, awarding to directors who have outstanding achievement in direction for motion pictures.

== Award winners and nominees ==
=== 1990s ===
Year	Winner and nominees (English)	Winner and nominees (Chinese)	English title	Original title
1990	Li Qiankuan/Xiao Guiyun	李前宽、肖桂云	Founding Ceremony	开国大典
1990	Xie Tieli/Zhao Yuan	谢铁骊、赵元	A Dream of the Red Mansions	红楼梦
1990	Chen Jialin	陈家林	Bai Se Qi Yi	百色起义
1991	N/A			
1991	Huang Jianzhong/Li Ziyu	黄健中、李子羽	Dragon Year Cops	龙年警官
1991	Sai Fu/Mai Lisi	赛夫、麦丽丝	Qi Shi Feng Yun	骑士风云
1991	Xia Gang	夏钢	Zao Yu Ji Qing	遭遇激情
1992	Sun Zhou	孙周	Xin Xiang	心香
1992	Ensable Directors	导演创作集体	Decisive Engagement: The Liaoxi-Shenyang Campaign	大决战
1992	Huang Jianzhong	黄健中	Spring Festival	过年
1992	Li Qiankuan/Xiao Guiyun	李前宽、肖桂云	Jue Zhan Zhi Hou	决战之后
1992	Li Xiepu	李歇浦	Kai Tian Pi Di	开天辟地
1992	Xu Geng	徐耿	Feng Yu Gu Yuan	风雨故园
1993	Xia Gang	夏钢	After Separation	大撒把
1993	Zhang Jianya	张建亚	San Mao Joins the Army	三毛从军记
1993	Zhang Yimou	张艺谋	The Story of Qiu Ju	秋菊打官司
1994	He Ping	何平	Red Firecracker, Green Firecracker	炮打双灯
1994	Sai Fu/Mai Lisi	赛夫、麦丽丝	To the East of Heroes	东归英雄传
1995	Huang Jianxin/Yang Yazhou	黄建新、杨亚洲	Back to Back, Face to Face	背靠背，脸对脸
1995	Zhou Xiaowen	周晓文	Ermo	二嫫
1996	Wu Tianming	吴天明	The King of Masks	变脸
1996	Chen Guoxing/Wang Ping	陈国星、王坪	Kong Fansen	孔繁森
1996	Ning Ying	宁瀛	Police Story	民警故事
1996	Ye Daying	叶大鹰	Red Cherry	红樱桃
1997	Wei Lian	韦廉	Da Zhuan Zhe	大转折
1997	Huang Shuqin	黄蜀芹	I Have a Dad	我也有爸爸
1997	Xie Jin	谢晋	The Opium War	鸦片战争
1998	Hu Bingliu	胡炳榴	Settlement	安居
1998	Sai Fu/Mai Lisi	赛夫、麦丽丝	Genghis Khan	一代天骄成吉思汗
1998	Yang Guangyuan	杨光远	The Liberation of Southwest China	大进军——席卷大西南
1998	Yang Yazhou	杨亚洲	A Tree in House	没事偷着乐
1999	Zhang Yimou	张艺谋	Not One Less	一个都不能少
1999	Huo Jianqi	霍建起	Postmen in the Mountains	那山那人那狗
1999	Teng Wenji	滕文骥	Spring Rhapsody	春天的狂想

=== 2000s ===
Year	Winner and nominees (English)	Winner and nominees (Chinese)	English title	Original title
2000	Chen Guoxing	陈国星	Heng Kong Chu Shi	横空出世
2000	Zhang Yimou	张艺谋	The Road Home	我的父亲母亲
2001	Huo Jianqi	霍建起	Love of Blueness	蓝色爱情
2001	Ding Yinnan	丁荫楠	Together Forever	相伴永远
2001	Huang Jianxin	黄建新	Who Cares?	谁说我不在乎
2002	Chen Kaige	陈凯歌	Together	和你在一起
2002	Yang Yazhou	杨亚洲	Pretty Big Feet	'美丽的大脚
2002	Sai Fu/Mai Lisi	赛夫、麦丽丝	Heavenly Grassland	天上草原
2003	Zhang Yimou	张艺谋	Hero	英雄
2003	Huo Jianqi	霍建起	Nuan	暖
2003	Zhai Junjie	翟俊杰	Jing Tao Hai Lang	惊涛骇浪
2003	Zheng Dongtian	郑洞天	Once Upon a Time in Taiwan	台湾往事
2004	Peng Xiaolian	彭小莲	Shanghai Story	美丽上海
2004	Zhang Yimou	张艺谋	House of Flying Daggers	十面埋伏
2005	Ma Liwen	马俪文	You and Me	我们俩
2005	Lu Chuan	陆川	Kekexili: Mountain Patrol	可可西里
2005	Lian Weilian/Shen Dong/Chen Jian	连威廉、沈东、陈健	On the Mountain of Tai Hang	太行山上
2005	Yin Li	尹力	Zhang Side	张思德
2006-2007	Qi Jian	戚健	The Forest Ranger	天狗
2006-2007	Yin Li	尹力	The Knot	云水谣
2006-2007	Gao Qunshu	高群书	Tokyo Trail	东京审判
2006-2007	Jacob Cheung	张之亮	A Battle of Wits	墨攻
2006-2007	Yu Zhong	俞钟	A Postman OF Paradise	香巴拉信使
2008-2009	Feng Xiaogang	冯小刚	Assembly	集结号
2008-2009	Cao Baoping	曹保平	The Equation of Love and Death	李米的猜想
2008-2009	Chen Kaige	陈凯歌	Forever Enthralled	梅兰芳
2008-2009	Gordon Chan	陈嘉上	Painted Skin	画皮
2008-2009	Ning Hao	宁浩	Crazy Racer	疯狂的赛车

=== 2010s ===
Year	Winner and nominees (English)	Winner and nominees (Chinese)	English title	Original title
2010-2011	Chen Li	陈力	Love in the Lounge Bridges	爱在廊桥
2010-2011	An Zhanjun	安战军	Through Stunning Storms	惊沙
2010-2011	Feng Xiaogang	冯小刚	Aftershock	唐山大地震
2010-2011	Gao Feng	高峰	The Old Village	老寨
2010-2011	Ning Cai	宁才	Mother	额吉
2010-2011	Zhang Meng	张猛	The Piano in a Factory	钢的琴
2012-2013	Peter Chan	陈可辛	American Dreams in China	中国合伙人
2012-2013	Wang Jing	王竞	Feng Shui	万箭穿心
2012-2013	Wong Kar-wai	王家卫	The Grandmaster	一代宗师
2012-2013	Feng Xiaogang	冯小刚	Back to 1942	一九四二
2014-2015	Tsui Hark	徐克	The Taking of Tiger Mountain	智取威虎山
2014-2015	Ba Yin	巴音	Norjmaa	诺日吉玛
2014-2015	Ann Hui	许鞍华	The Golden Era	黄金时代
2014-2015	Liang Ming	梁明	Flag	旗
2014-2015	Fu Dongyu	傅东育	The Sky of Tibet	西藏天空
2016-2017	Feng Xiaogang	冯小刚	I Am Not Madame Bovary	我不是潘金莲
2016-2017	Zheng Dasheng	郑大圣	Bangzi Melody	村戏
2016-2017	Cao Baoping	曹保平	The Dead End	烈日灼心
2016-2017	Cheng Er	程耳	The Wasted Times	罗曼蒂克消亡史
2016-2017	Guan Hu	管虎	Mr. Six	老炮儿
2018-2019	Dante Lam	林超贤	Operation Red Sea	红海行动
2018-2019	Frant Gwo	郭帆	The Wandering Earth	流浪地球
2018-2019	Huo Meng	霍猛	Crossing The Border-Zhaoguan	过昭关
2018-2019	Wang Xiaoshuai	王小帅	So Long, My Son	地久天长
2018-2019	Dong Yue	董越	The Looming Storm	暴雪将至
2018-2019	Lü Yue	吕乐	Lost, Found	找到你

=== 2020s ===
Year	Winner and nominees	English title	Original title
2020	Wang Rui	Chaogtu with Sarula	白云之下
2020	Yang Lina	Spring Tide	春潮
2020	Peter Chan	Leap	夺冠
2020	Chen Kaige, Zhang Yibai, Guan Hu, Xue Xiaolu, Xu Zheng, Ning Hao, Wen Muye	My People, My Country	我和我的祖国
2020	Zhou Shen, Liu Lu	Almost a Comedy	半个喜剧
2020	Derek Tsang	Better Days	少年的你
2021	Zhang Yimou	Cliff Walkers	悬崖之上
2021	Huang Jianxin; Zheng Dasheng	1921	1921
2021	Han Yan	A Little Red Flower	送你一朵小红花
2021	Lu Yang	A Writer's Odyssey	刺杀小说家
2021	Yin Li	A Hustle Bustle New Year	没有过不去的年
2022	Chen Kaige; Tsui Hark; Dante Lam	The Battle at Lake Changjin	长津湖
2022	Longman Leung	Anita	梅艷芳
2022	Wen Muye	Nice View	奇迹·笨小孩
2022	Xue Xiaolu	Embrace Again	穿过寒冬拥抱你
2022	Zhang Yimou; Zhang Mo	Sniper	狙击手
2023	Cheng Er	Hidden Blade	无名
2023	Deng Chao; Yu Baimei	Ping Pong: The Triumph	中国乒乓之绝地反击
2023	Wuershan	Creation of the Gods I: Kingdom of Storms	封神第一部：朝歌风云
2023	Chen Guoxing; Lahuajia	Back to Tibet	
2023	Wei Shujun	Yong'an Town Story Collection	
2024	Chen Kaige	The Volunteers: To the War	志愿军：雄兵出击
2024	Da Peng	One and Only	热烈
2024	Shen Ao	No More Bets	孤注一掷
2024	Han Yan	Viva La Vida	我们一起摇太阳
2024	Dai Mo	Endless Journey	三大队
2025	Chen Sicheng; Dai Mo	Detective Chinatown 1900	唐探1900
2025	Da Peng	The Lychee Road	长安的荔枝
2025	Anselm Chan	The Last Dance	破·地獄
2025	Shao Yihui	Her Story	好东西
2025	Gu Changwei	The Hedgehog	刺猬
