= Li Junxian =

Li Junxian, may refer to:

- Li Junxian (chemist), Chinese chemist, member of the Chinese Academy of Engineering
- Li Junxian (actor), Chinese actor
