= Storyline =

Storyline may refer to:

- The Plot (narrative) or subplot of a story
- The narrative of a work, whether of fictional or nonfictional basis
- The narrative threads experienced by each character or set of characters in a work of fiction
- The storyline method of teaching
- Alternative term for an angle in professional wrestling – see Glossary of professional wrestling terms: Angle

== Music ==
- Storyline (Raphe Malik album), 2000
- Story Line, 1991 album by Lorie Line
- Storyline, 2005 album by Mari Wilson
- Storyline (Hunter Hayes album), 2014
