= Cao Bingkun =

Chinese actor (born 1983)

- 曹炳琨
- Born: 1983 (age 42–43); Dongcheng District, Beijing
- Education: Beijing Film Academy
- Years active: 2008–

Cao Bingkun (Chinese: 曹炳琨; pinyin: Cáo Bǐngkūn) is a Chinese actor. He graduated from the acting department of Beijing Film Academy in 2005.

== Early life and education ==
Before deciding to become an actor, Cao wanted to become a chef. He went to a vocational high school to study cooking, and he interned at a roast duck restaurant.

Later on he began working as an extra, and then started studying at Beijing Film Academy in 2001.

== Filmography ==
=== Film ===
Year	Title	Chinese title	Role	Ref.
2009	Welcome to Shama Town	决战刹马镇		
2011	The First President	第一大总统		
2013	Personal Tailor	私人定制	'Commissioner'	
2013	The Four II	四大名捕2	Cai Xiang	
2018	Animal World	动物世界	Li Jun/Daxiami	
2019	Vortex	铤而走险	Lao Wan	
2019	Mao Zedong 1949	決勝時刻	Dai Pengcheng	
2021	Super Me	超级的我	San Ge	
2021	Never Stop	超越		
2023	The Third Squad		Cai Bin	
2026	Being Toward Death	10间敢死队	Liu Wanpeng	
2026	Crossing	四渡	Liu Bocheng	

=== Television ===
Year	Title	Chinese title	Role	Notes
2009	Lurk	潜伏	Xie Ruolin	
2009	Betray of the Femininity	温柔的背叛	Liu Qi	
2010	Weifeng Chuiluan de Aiqing	微风吹乱的爱情	Yang Dong	
2010	The Lost Temple	失踪的上清寺	Pan Tianbang	
2010	Golden Code	黄金密码	Duan Feng	
2010	Zhangmen Nüxu	掌门女婿	Fei Laoban	
2010	Chengshi Shenghuo	城市生活	A Hu	
2011	Qingchunqi Zhuang Shang Gengnianqi	青春期撞上更年期	Miao Zhiyu	
2012	Shen Bai: Zaihun Jinxing Shi	深白·再婚进行时	Huang Cheng	
2012	Aiya Mama	哎呀妈妈	Wei Xiaodong	
2012	AA Life Style	AA制生活	Zhang Lin	
2013	The Untold Story of Tibet	西藏秘密		
2013	Qin'ai de	亲爱的	Ma Xuewu	
2013	Shentou	渗透	Qi Gongzi	
2013	Without Thieves	无贼	Xiang Shang	
2014	Xuese Miqing	血色迷情	Xu Yuliang	
2014	Our Second Child	二胎	Lin Haisheng	
2014	Divorce Lawyers	离婚律师	Hou Daqiang	Guest appearance
2014	Bingbian 1929	兵变1929		
2016	In the War Brothers	战火中的兄弟	Gao Mingyuan	
2016	Jinling Battle	战金岭	Xia Feng	
2017	The Battle at the Dawn	黎明决战	Yang Jingxiu	
2017	Game of Hunting	猎场		Guest appearance
2018	To Love to Heal	我站在桥上看风景	Li Guodong	Guest appearance
2018	Great Expectations	远大前程	Xiang Ying	
2018	The Years You Were Late	你迟到的许多年	Feng Huan	
2019	Destiny's Love	爱上北斗星男友	You Wu	
2020	Lightning Fighters	雷霆战将	Kang Naiwen	
TBA	Love Me and Convince Me	红药水黑咖啡	Jiang Kan'er	
TBA	Tang Dynasty Diplomat Legend	大唐御使传奇	Wang Xuance	
TBA	Love in a Fallen City	一身孤注掷温柔		
TBA	Shen Hai	深海		
