= He Saifei =

Chinese actress

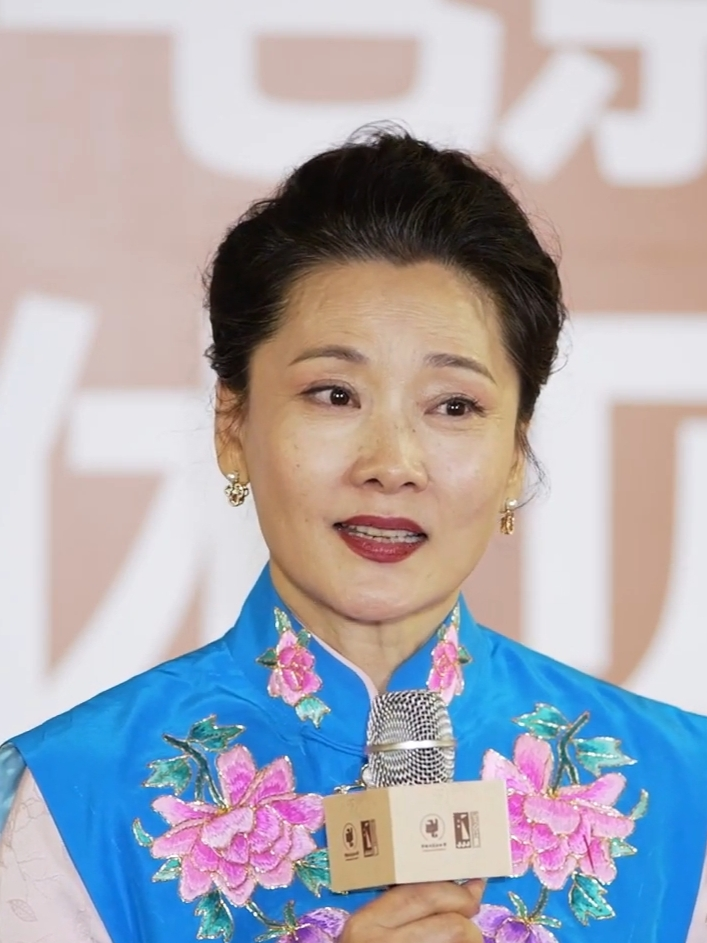
- He at the 36th Golden Rooster Awards Ceremony
- Born: April 11, 1963 (age 62); Daishan County, Zhejiang, China
- Occupation(s): Actress, singer
- Spouse: Yang Nan (杨楠) (m. 1988)
- Children: 1
- Family: 2 sisters including Xia Saili (夏赛丽)
- Musical career
- Genres: Yue opera

Chinese name
- Traditional Chinese: 何賽飛
- Simplified Chinese: 何赛飞
Transcriptions
Standard Mandarin
- Hanyu Pinyin: Hé Sàifēi

He Saifei (born 11 April 1963) is a Chinese actress of film and television, as well as a celebrated Yue opera performer of dan (female) roles. Internationally, she is best known for playing supporting roles in period films like Raise the Red Lantern (1991) and Temptress Moon (1996).

He Saifei is the most famous disciple of Yue opera star Zhang Yunxia.

== Early life ==
He Saifei was born in 1963 in an island in Daishan County, Zhoushan off the coast of mainland Zhejiang province. She has two sisters. When she was 3, the Cultural Revolution began. In 1967, her father was attacked and sent to the countryside. Her parents divorced, and Saifei lived with one parent while her two sisters lived with another, with no contact between them. After the Cultural Revolution ended in 1976, Yue opera (also known as Yue opera) gradually regained its popularity following a decade of ruinous destruction. When He Saifei was about 16, she successfully auditioned for a Yue opera troupe in Daishan. There she met a slightly younger girl who was also very interested in joining. Neither knew at first, but it turned out that the girl Xia Saili (夏赛丽) was none other than her long-lost sister. After some initial discomfort, they became very close and encouraged each other. In 1983–84, both made the newly established Zhejiang Xiaobaihua Yue Opera Troupe, which, consisting entirely of young girls would immediately take the Yue opera world by storm. He Saifei studied under the master Zhang Yunxia and specialized in Dan (female) roles. Xia Saili specialized in Sheng (mainly male scholar) roles, and as a result often portrayed her sister's lover on stage. Another of He Saifei's frequent on-stage partner was Mao Weitao.

== Early career ==
In 1984, the Zhejiang Xiaobaihua Yue Opera Troupe girls starred in the opera film Five Daughters Offering Felicitations (五女拜壽), which became a big national hit and won Best Opera Film (a new award category) at the 5th Golden Rooster Awards. In 1985, He Saifei and Mao Weitao reenacted a scene live at the CCTV New Year's Gala, China's most watched annual television event. This would be the first of He Saifei's four Yue opera appearances on CCTV New Year's Gala (excluding more performances on CCTV New Year's Opera Gala). Soon enough, He Saifei and four other girls from Xiaobaihua — Mao Weitao, He Ying (何英), Fang Xuewen (方雪雯), and Dong Kedi (董柯娣) — emerged as young celebrities, and they were together dubbed the "Five Golden Flowers" (五朵金花) of Yue opera.

== Personal life ==
She has one son, born in 1998.

== Filmography ==
=== Film ===
Year	English title	Original title	Role	Notes
1984	Five Daughters Offering Felicitations	五女拜壽	Cuiyun	Yue opera film
1987	Two Dowagers	兩宮皇太后	Zijuan	
1988	Tang Bohu	唐伯虎	Shen Jiuniang	Yue opera film
1990	Iron & Silk		Yue opera actress	English-language film
1991	Raise the Red Lantern	大紅燈籠高高掛	Mei Shan	
1995	Blush	紅粉	Xiao'e	
1995	Armed Working Team Behind Enemy Lines	敵後武工隊	Xiaohongyun	
1995	The Wandering Songstress	天涯歌女	Xiaohong	
1996	Temptress Moon	風月	Lin Xiuyi	
1999	Something About Secret	说出你的秘密	Employee	
2000	Woman Soccer Player #9	女足9号	Zhu Yin	
2007	Lust, Caution	色·戒	Madame Xiao	
2011	Deng Enming's Childhood	少年鄧恩銘		
2014	The Struggle of 80's	80后的独立宣言		
2016	Super Express	超级快递	Nana's mother	
2016	Lord of Shanghai	上海王		
2016	Goddesses in the Flames of War	那些女人		

=== Television ===
Year	English title	Original title	Role	Notes
2000	The Grand Mansion Gate	大宅门	Yang Jiuhong	
2003	Xiaozhuang Mishi	孝庄秘史	Harjol	
2012	Tears of Woman	女人泪	Wu Lifang	
2012	The New Son-in-Law Era	新女婿时代	Li Guilan	
2012	Our Youth in 1977	我们的青春1977	Shen Yumei	
2013	Na Jinhua and Her Son-in-law	那金花和她的女婿	Na Jinhua	
2013	Women of the Tang Dynasty	唐宮燕	Empress Wei	
2013	A Splendid Family	金玉满堂	Zhao Ningli	
2013	Safeguarding the Grandson	保卫孙子	Li Wanmei	
2013	Woman in a Family of Swordsmen	刀客家族的女人	Yu Huang Shi	
2014	If Happiness Arrives	假如幸福来临	Jiang Xinhui	
2014	Heping's Golden Age	和平的全盛时代	Ding Yulan	
2015	Our Family's Happy Life	我们家的微幸福生活	Yu Meiren	
2015	Living	活法	Wang Liru	
2016	See You! My Wife	再见，老婆大人	Zhen Meiren's mother	
2016	Seeking Nirvana at Shaolin	少林問道	Meigu	
2016	Mother's Romance	老妈的桃花运	Ding Xiangxiang	
2017	Xuanwu	玄武	Xiao Meigui	
2017	Green Love	青恋	Chunxia	
2024	Best Choice Ever	承欢记	Liu Wanyu	

== Awards and nominations ==
=== Film & TV ===
Year	#	Award	Category	Work	Result
1996	19th	Hundred Flowers Awards	Best Supporting Actress	Armed Working Team Behind Enemy Lines	Won
2014		China TV Drama Awards	Best Supporting Actress	Woman in a Family of Swordsmen	Nominated
2015	21st	Shanghai Television Festival	Best Supporting Actress	Woman in a Family of Swordsmen	Nominated
2016	3rd	China Australia International Film Festival	Best Actress	Goddesses in the Flames of War	Won
2018	16th	Pyongyang International Film Festival	Best Actress	Goddesses in the Flames of War	Won
2023	36th	Golden Rooster Awards	Best Actress	Off the Stage	Won
