= Zhang Yunxia =

Chinese Yue opera singer-actress

Zhang Yunxia (July 1926 – 18 April 2004), born Tao Dimin, was a Chinese Yue opera singer-actress who played Dan (female) roles. She studied under Yuan Xuefen but developed her own style, and is now recognized as the founder of the "Zhang school".

He Saifei, one of her students, rose to fame in the 1980s.
