= Only Fools Rush In =

- Theatrical release poster
- Chinese: 四海
- Hanyu Pinyin: Sì Hǎi
- Directed by: Han Han
- Written by: Han Han
- Produced by: Li Wenwen; Zeng Jiyuan
- Starring: Liu Haoran; Liu Haocun; Shen Teng; Yin Zheng
- Cinematography: Bai Yuxia
- Production company: PMF Pictures
- Release date: 1 February 2022
- Running time: 128 minutes
- Country: China
- Language: Mandarin
- Box office: $90 million

Only Fools Rush In is a 2022 comedy-drama film written and directed by Han Han. It was released in China on 1 February 2022 and was received poorly by audiences.

== Plot ==
The film follows Wu Renyao (Note: The character's name is a pun: Wu Renyao (吴仁耀; Wú Rényào) sounds like "not wanted by anyone" (无人要; wú rén yào).) (nicknamed Ah Yao), a young motorcycle enthusiast who begins to bond with his estranged father Wu Renteng who he has not seen in many years.

Walking at night he strolls into a restaurant where he sees young waitress Zhou Huansong. Attempting to put on a song for her on the jukebox he is interrupted by Zhou Huange. Yao sits down and Huange follows him, they get into an argument and Yao punches him. Huange reveals himself to be the brother of Huansong, also a leader of a motorcycling gang.

The two become friends and seeing Yao's talent with riding joins the group. This allows him to get closer to Huansong. They get into a drag race with a rival gang, who sabotages their bikes, throws things onto the track and cheats their way through it. Yao is about to win it for them when he accidentally crashes into a teammate who was going the wrong way.

The group opens a nightclub but not before Huange incurring a lot of debts from loan sharks. They meet Mr. Showta, a successful businessman from Guangzhou with great connections. Meanwhile, the local police is planning to intercept them at their next drag race as they have been illegally riding on dangerous roads.

The male members of the group go swimming in the ocean late at night when there is mist. Suddenly a cargo ship appears out of nowhere. Huange is swept under it and apparently drowns. All the debt that he incurred is now billed to Huansong.

Yao is chased by policemen, then at a sharp corner narrowly avoids crashing into a truck with sharp steel bars. He deliberately turns back and stops the police motorcycle from hitting the bars, earning himself a friend in the force.

Yao and Huansong embark on a journey to the city of Guangzhou to try and start a new life together. They find that the address Mr. Showta gave them is the Canton Tower, where he works as a maintenance technician. Unaware of the laws prohibiting motorcycles in the city of Guangzhou, theirs is seized and they are left with no money.

The two separate and find odd jobs, meeting occasionally but not advancing their relationship. Huansong goes back to being a waitress and Yao finds a job doing motorcycle stunts at a local amusement park.

The policeman whose life Yao saved says he will get a lighter sentence especially because he is helping Huansong pay back her brother's debts. At his job, Yao's boss gets him to be a stuntman taking the place of a more popular motorcycle rider, Miaohu, doing a huge jump at a stadium (and they will secretly switch through a trapdoor). Yao and his old gang friends meet at a restaurant where Huansong happens to be a waitress. She has a big gift for him (she saved up to buy him a motorcycle) but Yao tells her he can't make it.

Yao's boss and Miaohu get in a car accident on the way there so Yao has to do the whole stunt by himself. He wears a propellor that Huansong gifted him for good luck. Just as he is landing, he slips, the motorcycle crashes, igniting a huge fire.

== Cast ==
- Liu Haoran as Wu Renyao
- Liu Haocun as Zhou Huansong
- Shen Teng as Wu Renteng
- Yin Zheng as Zhou Huange
- Qiao Shan as Uncle Zi liang
- Zhou Qi as Dong Tu
- Wang Yanlin as Debt collector
- Huang Xiaoming as Showta
- Zhang Youhao as Hong Chen
- Feng Shaofeng as Officer Li
- Jordan Chan as Qiu Ge
- Wu Yanshu as Wu Renyao
- Alex Man as Uncle Liu
- Gao Huayang as Ju Xiong
- Zhao Ziqi as Chun Juan

== Production ==
The film's Chinese title Sì Hǎi (四海) literally means "four seas" or "the whole world". An early working title was Niánqīng de Gùshi (年轻的故事), "a young story".

The project was officially launched and gained approval for filming in February 2021. The same month, it was reported that shooting had started. It was filmed on Nan'ao Island and in Guangzhou. Production was finished on 20 August 2021 in Guangzhou.

The film features motorcycle racing scenes and a variety of different motorcycles. The film's director, Han Han, who has experience filming car racing, said that motorcycle scenes are much more difficult to film than car scenes. When filming a car scene, Han said, a drone can get very close to the vehicle to get a good shot, and in the event of a collision the damage to the drone is a tolerable cost, but when filming a motorcycle the filmmakers cannot risk a drone accidentally striking the driver.

== Release ==
Only Fools Rush In was released in mainland China on 1 February 2022 (Chinese New Year) and was shown in IMAX theaters. It was advertised as an uplifting film.

It was released in the United Kingdom on 4 February 2022.

== Reception ==
=== Box office ===
The film was highly anticipated, earning $44.48 million CNY in presales- It went on to gross an opening day of $225 million CNY ($33.74 million USD) placing second at the Chinese box office, after The Battle at Lake Changjin II. After receiving negative reviews, the film's daily box office grosses began dropping dramatically, to $62 million CNY ($9.79 million USD) by its third day and $25 million CNY ($3.98 million USD) by its fifth. By the end of the first week of the Chinese New Year holiday, the film had grossed a total of $475 million CNY ($76.3 million USD) ending up sixth place below Sniper. The film continued to drop in popularity and by 12 February had dropped below Dunk for the Future with a daily gross of $5.1 million CNY ($0.81 million USD).

=== Critical response ===
Though the film did well in pre-release ticket sales, it was a disappointment upon its release, receiving negative reviews from audiences. It received an average rating of 5.5 out of 10 on Douban and 8.7 out of 10 on Maoyan.

Sun Jiayin of Xinmin Evening News wrote that the film's storyline and themes were very similar to Han Han's previous productions (The Continent, Duckweed, and Pegasus), so much so as to make viewers feel as if they had seen it before.

== See also ==
- Four Seas
