= Viva La Vida (2024 film) =

2024 film directed by Han Yan

- Theatrical release poster
- Simplified Chinese: 我们一起摇太阳
- Hanyu Pinyin: Wǒmen yīqǐ yáo tàiyáng
- Directed by: Han Yan
- Written by: Han Yan; Li Fu
- Produced by: Yu Meng
- Starring: Peng Yuchang; Li Gengxi
- Cinematography: Da Jiang; Wang Chunzhi
- Edited by: Li Yakun
- Music by: Ji Ran; Wang Nana
- Production company: Lian Ray Pictures
- Distributed by: China Film Co., Ltd.
- Release date: March 30, 2024
- Running time: 129 minutes
- Country: China
- Language: Mandarin
- Box office: US$38.1 million

Viva La Vida (Chinese: 我们一起摇太阳) is a 2024 Chinese romantic drama film co-written and directed by Han Yan. Adapted from a non-fiction article, it tells the story of two gravely ill young individuals, Lü Tu (Peng Yuchang) and Ling Min (Li Gengxi), who embark on an unexpected journey of love and strength. The film was theatrically released on March 30, 2024.

== Synopsis ==
When the scatterbrained Lü Tu meets the sullen Ling Min, two young individuals with severe illnesses but vastly different personalities, they unexpectedly embark on a healing journey due to a "life relay" agreement.

== Cast ==
- Peng Yuchang as Lü Tu
- Li Gengxi as Ling Min
- Xu Fan as Tao Yi
- Gao Yalin as Ling's father
- Liu Dan as Ling's mother
- Li Chen as Policeman
- Song Yiren as Jia Hui
- Wang Xun as Zhao Dahu

== Production ==
The production of Viva La Vida was led by Lianrui Pictures, with Han Yan directing and co-writing the script alongside Li Fu. The film is adapted from the non-fiction article "The Most Pragmatic Marriage Deal, The Most Emotional Eternal Promise", and continues Han's signature style of emotional storytelling, particularly in portraying medical and life-affirming narratives. Filming took place in Changsha, Hunan, China, where the city's urban energy and local culture provided a vibrant yet grounded backdrop for the story. The film employs handheld cinematography and jump cut editing, enhancing its documentary-like realism. The production team also paid special attention to authentic medical details, ensuring a deeply emotional and realistic portrayal of the challenges faced by critically ill patients.

== Release ==
Viva La Vida was slated for a Chinese New Year release on February 10, 2024, but to avoid competition, the studio made the strategic decision to postpone its premiere to March 30, 2024. The film later expanded internationally, with a limited screening in Japan on April 19, 2024, before gradually reaching a wider audience in the country. Despite the delayed release, the film grossed 276 million yuan globally as of June 9, 2024.

== Accolades ==
Year	Award	Category	Recipient(s)	Result	Ref.
2024	19th Changchun Film Festival - Golden Deer Award	Best Film	Viva La Vida	Nominated	
2024	19th Changchun Film Festival - Golden Deer Award	Best Screenplay	Han Yan, Li Fu	Nominated	
2024	19th Changchun Film Festival - Golden Deer Award	Best Actor	Peng Yuchang	Won	
2024	19th Changchun Film Festival - Golden Deer Award	Best Actress	Li Gengxi	Won	
2024	10th Wenrong Awards	Best Actor	Peng Yuchang	Won	
2024	39th Huading Awards	Best Actor	Peng Yuchang	Nominated	
2024	37th Golden Rooster Awards	Best Picture	Viva La Vida	Nominated	
2024	37th Golden Rooster Awards	Best Director	Han Yan	Nominated	
2024	37th Golden Rooster Awards	Best Actor	Peng Yuchang	Nominated	
2024	37th Golden Rooster Awards	Best Actress	Li Gengxi	Won	
2024	37th Golden Rooster Awards	Best Supporting Actress	Xu Fan	Nominated	
2024	37th Golden Rooster Awards	Best Writing	Han Yan, Li Fu	Won	
2024	37th Golden Rooster Awards	Best Editing	Li Yakun	Nominated	
2024	37th Golden Rooster Awards	Best Music	Ji Ran, Wang Nana	Nominated	
