= Temptress Moon =

1996 film by Chen Kaige

- Theatrical release poster
- Traditional Chinese: 風月
- Simplified Chinese: 风月
- Hanyu Pinyin: Fēng yuè
- Directed by: Chen Kaige
- Written by: Chen Kaige; Wang Anyi
- Screenplay by: Shu Kei
- Produced by: Hsu Feng; Sunday Sun; Tong Cunlin
- Starring: Leslie Cheung; Gong Li; Kevin Lin; He Saifei; David Wu
- Cinematography: Christopher Doyle
- Edited by: Pei Xiaonan
- Music by: Zhao Jiping
- Production companies: Tomson Films; Shanghai Film Studio
- Distributed by: Tomson (Hong Kong) Films Co., Ltd. (China); Miramax Films (US)
- Release date: May 14, 1996 (Cannes)
- Running time: 125 minutes
- Countries: China; Taiwan; Hong Kong
- Language: Mandarin

Temptress Moon is a 1996 film directed by Chen Kaige. It was jointly produced by the Shanghai Film Studio and the Taipei-based Tomson Films. The film saw Chen reuniting with Leslie Cheung and Gong Li who had previously worked with him in his breakout international hit Farewell My Concubine.

Ye Zhaoyan's novel A Flower's Shade was believed to be the basis for the film, although Ye was not credited in the film.

Temptress Moon premiered at the 1996 Cannes Film Festival, where it was in competition for the Palme d'Or that eventually went to Mike Leigh's Secrets & Lies. Despite its international profile, the film was banned by state authorities in mainland China.

== Plot ==
It is the day of the abdication of Emperor Puyi; the Pang clan, a wealthy family, is in decline. Zhongliang, a thirteen-year-old boy, arrives at the Pang estate to live with his sister Xiuyi and her husband Zhengda, a heavy opium user and the son of the family head. Ruyi, daughter of the head of the family, has been raised as an opium addict from birth and is consequently unable to be married off; she is running happily through the estate when Zhongliang arrives. Duanwu, a cousin with no prospects, longs to play with Ruyi. All three momentarily share a doorway. Zhongliang is treated like a servant, including being expected to prepare Zhengda's nightly opium pipe; it is heavily implied that Zhengda sexually abuses Zhongliang by forcing him into having sex with Xiuyi. After six months of continued abuse, Zhongliang flees the estate.

Ten years later, Zhongliang has become a gigolo who seduces rich, married women for his boss Biggie in order to blackmail them. The scheme involves Zhongliang meeting a woman in a room and signaling his partners. His partners in crime storm the room, "capture" the couple by pulling black bags over their heads, and pretend to murder Zhongliang. The woman is then blackmailed to prevent exposure of the affair. Zhongliang's success with the scam has made it highly lucrative, and Biggie treats Zhongliang like a son. Zhongliang has been seeing one particular target, "the woman of Zephyr Lane", for weeks, and appears to have developed feelings for her; he lies to Biggie, telling him that her husband is out of town, and thus they cannot proceed with the blackmail against her.

At the Pang estate, Zhengda has been seriously ill for the past ten years; he is unable to move or speak. As a result, when her father dies, Ruyi is named the head of the family. The family elders refuse to let a woman fully control the fate of the family, since women are "weak". Duanwu is outside the line of succession and cannot have any designs on leading the family himself, so they name him to assist Ruyi. However, when Ruyi uses her authority to expel her father's and brother's concubines, Duanwu supports her against the elders' wishes; infuriated, the elders beat Duanwu for his lack of manliness. Ruyi reasons that the concubines have been given the freedom that she longs for and will never have.

Interested in acquiring the Pang family's money, Biggie sends Zhongliang back to the estate to seduce Ruyi. Zhongliang encounters his sister, whom he hates, but who claims that Zhongliang owes her for helping him to escape the estate ten years ago. Ruyi falls in love with Zhongliang, and seduces Duanwu in order to "practice" for Zhongliang, who claims he will take her with him when he leaves. Zhongliang, haunted by his past and unable to go through with the plan, abandons it at the last moment and returns to Shanghai alone. Ruyi is heartbroken, unable to speak of anything else, and Duanwu is beaten by the elders again for helping Ruyi plan to leave.

To atone for his failure, Zhongliang agrees to swindle the woman of Zephyr Lane. Biggie, sensing Zhongliang is wavering in his duties despite this show of loyalty, tricks Ruyi into coming to Shanghai. Ruyi is accompanied by Duanwu, and both are exposed to the modern world for the first time. Ruyi is taken to a room across the street from Zhongliang's rendezvous where she witnesses Zhongliang's scam through the window. Not caring about her husband, the woman of Zephyr Lane demands to know if Zhongliang ever loved her, a question Zhongliang doesn't answer. The woman of Zephyr Lane throws herself off the balcony; Zhongliang is distraught by her death, and Biggie observes to his subordinates that Zhongliang is now permanently "ruined". Ruyi comes to the dance hall and confronts Zhongliang, repeatedly asking if Zhongliang loved her or the woman of Zephyr Lane, but Zhongliang does not answer her. When Ruyi returns to the boarding room in Shanghai she shares with Duanwu, Duanwu rapes her.

Ruyi returns to the Pang estate and learns that her childhood betrothal, Jingyun, has returned. Jingyun informs Ruyi that their initial betrothal was ended by his family against his wishes. Zhongliang also returns to the estate; upon learning of Jingyun's return, he desperately tries to win Ruyi back, but she informs him she no longer loves him and will soon be married to Jingyun. Zhongliang prepares her opium pipe that evening, just as he did years ago for Zhengda, and it is revealed that he poisoned Zhengda with arsenic; he poisons Ruyi's pipe in the same manner, with his sister's help, who knew that he had also poisoned her husband. Struck with remorse, Zhongliang attempts to stop Ruyi from taking the poison, but he arrives too late; the next morning, as he prepares to board a ship to leave, he is gunned down at the dock. Duanwu is proclaimed the new head of the Pang clan, while Ruyi is shown tied to a wheelchair, in the same state as her brother. A brief shot shows Zhongliang, Duanwu, and Ruyi as children, standing in the doorway on the night of the Emperor's abdication.

== Cast ==
- Gong Li as Pang Ruyi, the only daughter and ruler of the Pang clan.
- Kevin Lin as Pang Duanwu, a distant cousin to Pang Ruyi.
- Leslie Cheung as Yu Zhongliang, the brother-in-law to Ruyi.
- He Saifei as Yu Xiuyi, Zhongliang's sister.
- Zhou Ye Mang as Pang Zhengda, Ruyi's brother and husband to Yu Xiuyi;
- Patrick Tse as Biggie, a Triad boss who employs Zhongliang as a gigolo in his extortion schemes
- Zhou Jie as Woman on Zephyr Lane, Zhongliang develops a personal attachment to this woman who the Boss wishes to blackmail.
- David Wu as Jingyun, Ruyi's betrothed as a child.
- Zhou Xun a nightclub girl
- Chang Shih Li Niangjiu
- Lin Lian Kun as Pang An
- Ko Hsiang-ting as Elder Qi
- Ren Lei as the young Yu Zhongliang
- Ying Wang as the young Pang Ruyi
- Lin Ge as the young Pang Duanwu

== Production ==
Despite its smaller-scale story, Temptress Moon proved far more difficult a production than its predecessor, Chen's Farewell My Concubine. Although filming began in 1994, Moon did not wrap until more than a year later in 1995; the film's budget in the intervening time having ballooned to over $7 million (US), over twice as much as Concubine. Other problems arose as well, notably the firing of the original Ruyi, the Taiwanese actress Wang Ching-ying, about halfway through the shoot. The resulting delay lasted five months before filming resumed with Gong Li in the lead role.

== Reception ==
Unlike the near universal praise for Concubine, Temptress Moon's reception abroad was considerably more muted. Critics praised the sumptuous visuals by Australian cinematographer Christopher Doyle, but also cited the confusing plot. Roger Ebert, in a typical review, noted "Temptress Moon is a hard movie to follow--so hard, that at some point you may be tempted to abandon the effort and simply enjoy the elegant visuals..." The New York Times also praised the film's sumptuous production values, but critic Stephen Holden also found the film to lack emotional weight, arguing that Temptress Moon ultimately "has the feel of a chic, kink-ornamented romantic pageant, unfolding at a distance."

Temptress Moon holds a 62% rating on Rotten Tomatoes based on reviews from 13 critics. Asiaweek highlighted the film in its list of the 10 best films of 1996.

=== Awards and nominations ===
- 1996 Cannes Film Festival - Official selection
- Hong Kong Film Awards, 1997
  - Best Actress — Gong Li (nominated)
  - Best Cinematography — Christopher Doyle (nominated)
  - Best Art Direction — Wong Hap-Kwai (nominated)
- Golden Horse Awards, 1996
  - Best Actor — Leslie Cheung (nominated)

== Home media release ==
Temptress Moon was released on Region 1 DVD in the United States and Canada on July 2, 2002, by Miramax Films through Buena Vista Home Video label. The DVD features subtitles in English.
