= Huang Yazhou =

Chinese novelist, poet and screenwriter (born 1949)

- 黄亚洲
- Born: August 1949 (age 76–77); Hangzhou, Zhejiang, China
- Occupations: Novelist, poet and screenwriter
- Writing career
- Language: Chinese
- Period: 1970s–present
- Genres: Novel, poem, drama
- Notable works: Beginning of The Great Revival; The Sun Comes Up in The East; Lei Feng

Huang Yazhou (simplified Chinese: 黄亚洲; traditional Chinese: 黃亞洲; pinyin: Huáng Yàzhōu; born 1949) is a Chinese novelist, poet and screenwriter. He is now a member of Chinese Communist Party and the president of Zhejiang Writers Association.

== Biography ==
Huang was born in 1949 in Hangzhou, Zhejiang, with his ancestral hometown in Xiaoshan District, where was He Zhizhang's hometown.

Huang primarily studied at Yinmajingxiang School (饮马井巷小学). When he was a senior high school student, he wrote a play Wang Banxian (王半仙) and acted it out by himself.

When the Down to the Countryside Movement was launched by Mao Zedong, Huang became a soldier in Zhejiang Production and Construction Corps, and he published his Novella Intersection (交叉口) and a collection of poems, The Thick Grove (密密的小树林).

In 1975, Huang was assigned to a factory in Tongxiang County as an official, his short story The Story of River Water and Well Water (河水和井水的故事) won the 1st Zhejiang Excellent Children's Literature Award. In 1979, his drama The Investigator's Love (侦查员的爱) was edited and filmed by Xi'an Film Studio.

In November 1979, Huang was transferred to Jiaxing as an editor in Southern Lake (南湖) periodical office, his drama The Shipper (女船王) was made into TV series, and won the 1st National Excellent TV Series Award.

In 1989, Huang's drama Chinese Creation Myth (开天辟地) was edited and filmed by Shanghai Film Studio, and won the National Excellent TV Series Award, National Five Top Project Award, and 12thGolden Rooster Award for Best Writing.

In the end of the 1989, Huang was transferred to Zhejiang Writers Association as an official, he published his collection of poems Four Questions of The West Lake (西湖四问). When he returned to Hangzhou, he wrote the dramas The Old House and The New House (老房子新房子) and The Wild Girl Molihua(野姑娘茉莉花). The Wild Girl Molihua won the 11th China Golden Eagle TV Art Awards.

From 1991 to 1993, Huang published the dramas The Sun's Cradle (太阳的摇篮), The Bodyguard Hauser (保镖哈斯尔) and The Luohe Town's brother (落河镇的兄弟). The Luohe Town's brother won the 12th Frankfurt International Film Festival for Children Award and 12th Chicago International Film Festival for Children Award.

In 1990, Huang served as the president of Zhejiang Writers Association, he published the dramas Deng Xiaopong: 1928 (邓小平：1928), Zhang Zhizhong (张治中) and The Story of Shanghai (上海沧桑). The Story of Shanghai won the Flying Apsaras Award.

In 2001, Huang published his novel The Sun Comes Up in The East (日出东方) and won the National Five Top Project Award and National Book Award.

In 2005, Huang published his collection of poems Singing on The Long March Trail (行吟长征路) and won the 4th Lu Xun Literary Prize and National Excellent Poem Award.

In June 2008, Huang published his collection of poems How Great The People's Republic of China (中国如此震动) and the novel, Lei Feng (雷锋).

In 2011, Huang wrote the novel, Beginning of The Great Revival (建党大业), which was edited and filmed by director Han Sanping.

In 2013, Huang's novel Lei Feng won the National Five Top Project Award, his dramas Give You A Bear Heart (给你一颗豹子胆) won 2012 Xia Yan Film Prize, and his poems I Singing in Beijing (我弹拨着北京中轴线歌唱) won the Zhouzhou Shihui Award.

== Works ==
=== Novellas ===
- Intersection (交叉口)

=== Long-gestating novels ===
- The Sun Comes Up in The East (日出东方)
- Lei Feng (雷锋)
- Beginning of The Great Revival (建党大业)

=== Short stories ===
- Childhood (儿童时代)

=== Poems ===
- The Thick Grove (密密的小树林)
- Four Questions of The West Lake (西湖四问)
- Singing on The Long March Trail (行吟长征路)
- How Great The People's Republic of China (中国如此震动)
- I Singing in Beijing (我弹拨着北京中轴线歌唱)

=== Dramas ===
- The Investigator's Love (侦查员的爱)
- The Shipper (女船王)
- Chinese Creation Myth (开天辟地)
- The Old House and The New House (老房子新房子)
- The Wild Girl Molihua (野姑娘茉莉花)
- The Sun's Cradle (太阳的摇篮)
- The Bodyguard Hauser (保镖哈斯尔)
- The Luohe Town's brother (落河镇的兄弟)
- Deng Xiaopong: 1928 (邓小平：1928)
- Zhang Zhizhong (张治中)
- The Story of Shanghai (上海沧桑)
- Give You A Bear Heart (给你一颗豹子胆)
