= Li Gengxi =

Chinese actress

- 李庚希
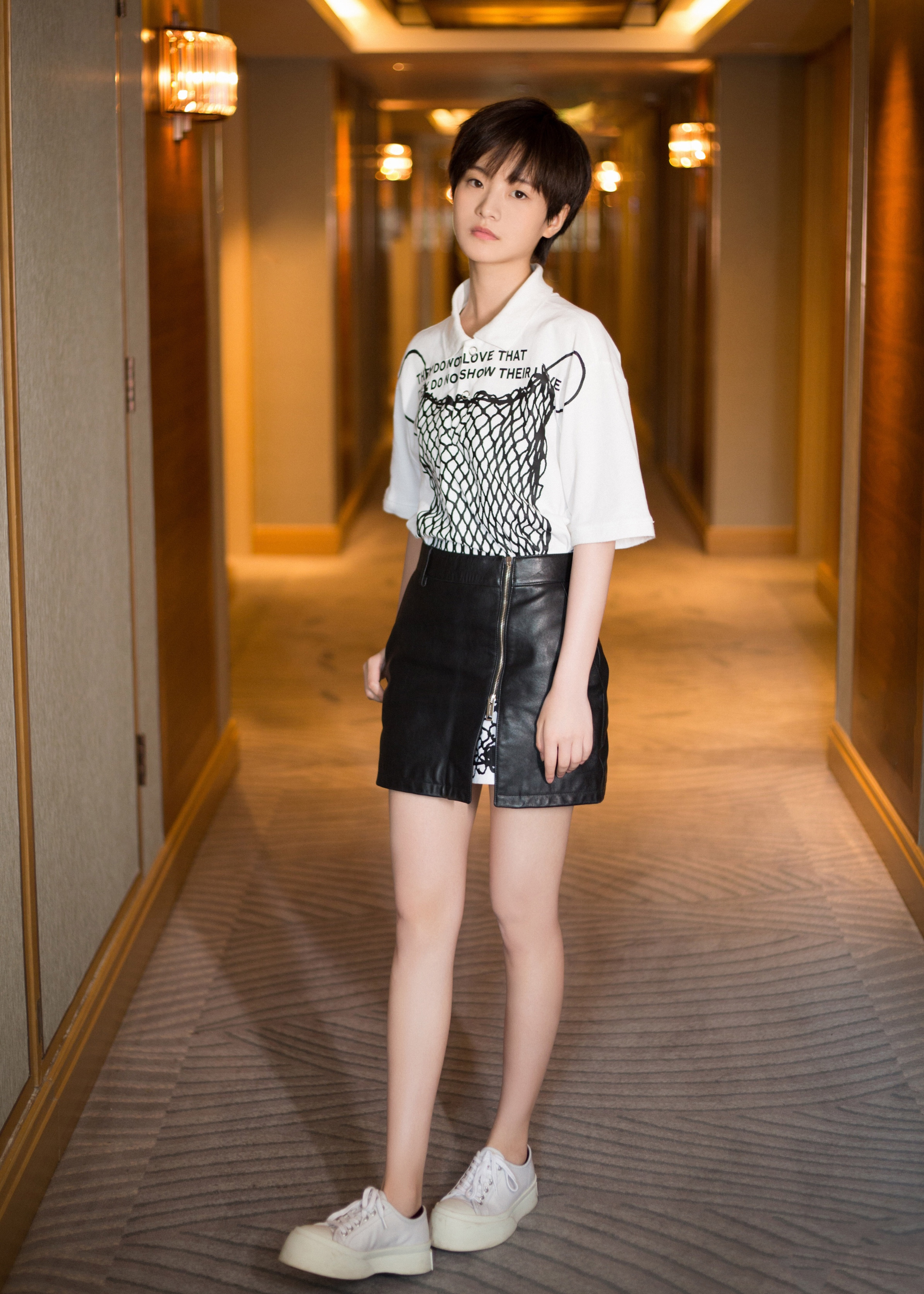
- Li in 2019
- Born: 22 April 2000 (age 25); Beijing, China
- Other names: Teresa Li
- Occupation: Actress
- Years active: 2018–present
- Agent: Beijing Kaila Pictures

Chinese name
- Traditional Chinese: 李庚希
- Simplified Chinese: 李庚希
Transcriptions
Standard Mandarin
- Hanyu Pinyin: Lǐ Gēngxī

Li Gengxi (Chinese: 李庚希; pinyin: Lǐ Gēngxī; born 22 April 2000), also known as Teresa Li, is a Chinese actress. She first gained recognition in A Little Reunion (2019), and has since starred in television series such as Sword Snow Stride (2021) and The Long Season (2023). Li's performance in the film Viva La Vida (2024) earned her the Golden Rooster Award for Best Actress.

== Early life and education ==
Li was born in Beijing, on 22 April 2000. She went to the United States to study in middle school.

== Acting career ==
Li made her television debut in Never Gone (2018), playing Mo Yuhua.

In 2020, Li appeared in two television series, Twenty Your Life On and Nothing But Thirty.

In 2021, Li starred opposite Zhang Ruoyun and Hu Jun in the costume television series Sword Snow Stride.

Li reprised her role as Luo Yan in the Twenty Your Life On sequel, Twenty Your Life On 2 (2022).

In 2024, Li played the role of Ling Min in Han Yan's film Viva La Vida, for which she won the Best Actress Award at the 19th Changchun Film Festival and the 37th Golden Rooster Awards.

== Filmography ==
=== Film ===
Year	English title	Chinese title	Role	Notes
2021	The Day We Lit Up the Sky	燃野少年的天空	Guest	
2021	The Old Town Girls	兔子暴力	Shui Qing	
2024	Viva La Vida	我们一起摇太阳	Ling Min	
2025	Resurrection	狂野时代	Tai Zhaomei	
2025	Malice	恶意	Chenchen	
2025	Casual Revenge	即兴谋杀	He Siyi	

=== Television ===
Year	English title	Chinese title	Role	Notes
2018	My Classmate From Far Far Away	同学两亿岁	Xuan Mo	
2018	Never Gone	原来你还在这里	Mo Yuhua	
2019	A Little Reunion	小欢喜	Qiao Yingzi	
2020	Twenty Your Life On	二十不惑	Luo Yan	
2020	Nothing But Thirty	三十而已	Luo Yan	Cameo
2021	Truth or Dare	花好月又圆	Xiao Wanzi	
2021	New Generation: Beautiful You	我们的新时代	He Miaoyun	
2021	Sword Snow Stride	雪中悍刀行	Jiang Ni	
2022	Beyond	超越	Chen Mian	
2022	Twenty Your Life On 2	二十不惑2	Luo Yan	
2022	The Examination for Everyone	大考	Tian Wenwen	
2022	From Repair To Pair	月里青山淡如画	Qiu Yuanyuan	
2023	The Long Season	漫长的季节	Shen Mo	
2024	Later, I Laughed	不讨好的勇气	Wu Xiuya	
2025	The Hunt	命悬一生	Wu Ximei	

== Accolades ==
Year	Nominated work	Award	Category	Result
2024	Viva La Vida	19th Changchun Film Festival	Best Actress	Won
2024	Viva La Vida	37th Golden Rooster Awards	Best Actress	Won
