= Hidden Blade =

2023 Chinese film

- Theatrical release poster
- Simplified Chinese: 无名
- Traditional Chinese: 無名
- Literal meaning: Anonymous ("Without Name")
- Directed by: Cheng Er
- Written by: Cheng Er
- Produced by: Yu Dong
- Starring: Tony Leung; Wang Yibo
- Cinematography: Cai Tao, Liao Hui
- Edited by: Cheng Er
- Production companies: Polybona Films; Cutting Edge Pictures
- Distributed by: Polybona Films; China Film Co. Huaxia Film; Alibaba Pictures
- Release date: January 22, 2023
- Running time: 128 minutes
- Country: China
- Languages: Mandarin; Shanghainese; Japanese; Cantonese
- Box office: $139.1 million

Hidden Blade is a 2023 Chinese period spy thriller film directed by Cheng Er and starring Tony Leung and Wang Yibo. The film was released in China on January 22, 2023 (Chinese New Year). The film has grossed $139 million worldwide.

== Premise ==
The film is set in Japanese-occupied Shanghai during the Second Sino-Japanese War, detailing the espionage that resulted in the end of Japanese occupation and the rise of China's Communist Party.

Scenes of the movie cut between flashbacks and flashforwards and center around three characters during Japan's occupation of China: Director He (Leung), Mr. Ye (Yibo), and Officer Watanabe (Mori).

== Plot ==
A flashback shows a young man who goes by He (Tony Leung) witnessing the final bombing of Guangzhou in 1938 in a makeshift mine alongside other survivors.

Shortly before the bombing of Pearl Harbor in 1941, the man rose through the ranks to become the director of Shanghai's Political Security Department, a counterespionage division overseen by Officer Watanabe. Despite showing loyalty to the Wang Jingwei regime, Director He secretly works for the Chinese Communist Party alongside his wife Ms. Chen (Zhou Xun). Together, they provide information to the underground network as a means of destroying Japanese occupation via espionage. Ms. Chen works alongside the party's secretary Mr. Zhang (Huang Lei) and the former corresponds with her husband via pastries from a local bakery. As a supposedly loyal worker, Director He diligently performs his tasks of assassinating, interrogating, and torturing as a means of gaining Officer Watanabe's trust.

Among Officer Watanabe's inner circle is Minister Tang (Da Peng), Captain Wang (Eric Wang), and a young officer named Mr. Ye (Wang Yibo). Officer Watanabe is ambitious, believing he should do what he can to gain political power through the puppet government, yet suspicious of his men's intentions. After secretly saving communist spy Ms. Jiang (Shuying) after she failed to assassinate Minister Tang, Director He is given information regarding important Japanese individuals such as a Japanese Prince currently serving within the military.

Peace negotiations were initially planned between Japan and the Chiang regime, which would redeploy Japanese forces to fight against the Soviet Union and allow the Chiang regime to continue fighting the Chinese Communist Party at the cost of (de facto) ceding Manchuria. With the newfound information, the Chinese Communist Party ambushes and assassinates the Japanese Prince and his brigade during their last excursion. The event causes Japan to break off negotiations and the death of the prince compromises Officer Watanabe's reputation.

Mr. Ye's lover Ms. Fang (Zhang Jingyi), a dancer and member of the Chinese Communist Party, helps assassinate Minister Tang and breaks off her relationship with Mr. Ye, who angrily takes it out on random Japanese soldiers. He later finds out that Captain Wang raped and killed her due to her political affiliation and Captain Wang mysteriously disappears soon after. Officer Watanabe becomes more suspicious of Director He after discovering he was cousins with Minister Tang and decides to use Mr. Ye as his double agent. The attack on Pearl Harbor is announced and the Wang Jingwei regime declares war on Great Britain and the United States, causing Shanghai to be completely occupied by the Japanese military. Mr. Ye becomes closer to Watanabe, who now wants to further his political ambitions with the former's help.

Mr. Zhang fears the worst for himself and attempts to run away with Ms. Chen before discovering she was married the whole time. Only working for the Chinese Communist Party for money and possible peace, he decides to turn himself into Shanghai's Political Security Department. Mr. Zhang unknowingly reports the Chinese Communist Party's activities to Director He, who kills him, and visits his wife to check on her. Officer Watanabe orders Mr. Ye to take down Director He, and a bloody fight between the two ensues at Ms. Chen's apartment. Mr. Ye returns to Officer Watanabe heavily injured but reports that Director He was arrested and Ms. Chen was killed. Officer Watanabe rewards Mr. Ye by making him his new secretary and showing the latter a map of territories and intel that would help strengthen Japan's occupation of China via Manchuria. The two head to Manchuria to start their new political and military careers.

Director He is disguised as a political prisoner but is released soon after the Japanese surrender in 1945. As he leaves the prison, he sees a prison truck enter that includes Officer Watanabe and Mr. Ye among the incoming prisoners. Mr. Ye silently mocks Director He as the truck drives through the gates and Officer Watanabe laughs when Director He tries to retaliate. In the prison's washroom, Officer Watanabe tells Mr. Ye that he is no longer motivated to pursue any political power now that Manchuria is no longer under Japanese occupation, and wonders how Manchuria fell despite it being the best stronghold for Japan. He also contemplates starting a new life from scratch as a farmer, attempts to take off his uniform in defeat, and says both would be granted immunity despite the crimes they committed. Mr. Ye, however, stops him and implies that Officer Watanabe should die as a Japanese officer.

It is revealed that Mr. Ye was double-crossing Officer Watanabe the whole time. At Director He's orders, Mr. Ye intentionally gained Officer Watanabe's trust and was working as a double agent for the Chinese Communist Party. Mr. Ye explains that Manchuria fell because of the information Officer Watanabe gave him in exchange for supposedly killing Ms. Chen and arresting Director He. Mr. Ye then kills Officer Watanabe with Director He's knife before cleaning and returning the blade to its owner. Director He, waiting in the nearby office, thanks Mr. Ye for his hard work and efforts.

The movie reveals Ms. Chen was alive the whole time and she, Director He, and Mr. Ye are living unassuming lives in 1946 Hong Kong. Mr. Ye secretly buys coffee for Ms. Chen at a cafe before visiting a restaurant run by Captain Wang's family. Captain Wang's parents reveal that they escaped Shanghai after their son's disappearance and believes their son is still alive in China. Mr. Ye leaves to avoid further suspicion from Captain Wang's sister and he visits a nearby temple, running into Director He as he prays. Director He ultimately returns to Shanghai to see the bakery through which he corresponded with his wife still running and reminisces about how his life came to be.

The movie cuts back to Captain Wang confessing to Mr. Ye about Ms. Fang's death. Initially never trusting Mr. Ye, Captain Wang attempts to shoot him but discovers that the latter had removed all the bullets from the gun. Mr. Ye then confesses that he is a Communist all along working for the Chinese Communist Party. Captain Wang is then killed by Mr. Ye, explaining the former's apparent disappearance.

== Cast ==
- Tony Leung as Director He of Shanghai's Political Security Department for the Wang Jingwei regime.
- Wang Yibo as Mr. Ye: Officer and subbordinate of Director He.
- Zhou Xun as Ms. Chen: Director He's wife and Communist Party member.
- Huang Lei as Mr. Zhang: Roommate of Ms. Chen and a Secretary for the Communist Party. Attempted to change sides out of fear.
- Hiroyuki Mori as Officer Watanabe

Japanese official overseeing Shanghai's Political Security Department. A devoted follower of General Ishiwara's faction and ambitious for political power.

- Da Peng as Minister Tang

Minister for Shanghai's Political Security Department. Cousin of Director He. Loyal to Wang Jingwei regime.

- Eric Wang as Captain Wang

Captain within Shanghai's Political Security Department. Loyal to the Wang Jingwei regime.

- Jiang Shuying as Ms. Jiang

Member of the Communist Party. Attempted to assassinate Minister Tang and supposedly executed.

- Zhang Jingyi as Ms. Fang

Dancer and former lover of Mr. Ye. Member of the Communist Party.

== Production ==
Hidden Blade is produced by Polybona Films as the third installment in its "China Victory Trilogy", following Chinese Doctors (2021) and The Battle at Lake Changjin (2021). It is written and directed by Cheng Er, best known for Lethal Hostage (2012) and The Wasted Times (2016). Filming began in Shanghai in August 2021 and completed in December of the same year. On casting, Tony Leung agreed to the project because he found Cheng Er's previous work interesting. Cheng Er also stated that Wang Yibo was his only choice for the second leading role.

In February 2022, the production team released a teaser trailer with two men conversing in Shanghainese, spawning rumors that the entire film would be in the dialect. It prompted the film to release an official poster clarifying that there will also be "Mandarin, Cantonese, and foreign language". A longer trailer was released in September 2022.

The film originally targeted an August 2022 release date, but moved to January 2023 to take advantage of the Chinese New Year release window.

== Awards and nominations ==
Award	Category	Recipient(s)	Result
36th Golden Rooster Awards	Best Feature Film	Hidden Blade	Nominated
36th Golden Rooster Awards	Best Screenplay	Cheng Er	Nominated
36th Golden Rooster Awards	Best Director	Cheng Er	Won
36th Golden Rooster Awards	Best Actor	Tony Leung	Won
36th Golden Rooster Awards	Best Supporting Actor	Wang Yibo	Nominated
36th Golden Rooster Awards	Best Cinematography	Cai Tao, Liao Hui	Nominated
36th Golden Rooster Awards	Best Art	Sun Li	Nominated
36th Golden Rooster Awards	Best Editing	Cheng Er	Won
15th Macau International Movie Festival - Golden Lotus Award	Best Feature Film	Hidden Blade	Won
15th Macau International Movie Festival - Golden Lotus Award	Best Director	Cheng Er	Won
15th Macau International Movie Festival - Golden Lotus Award	Best Screenplay	Cheng Er	Nominated
15th Macau International Movie Festival - Golden Lotus Award	Best Actor	Tony Leung	Nominated
15th Macau International Movie Festival - Golden Lotus Award	Best Actress	Zhou Xun	Nominated
15th Macau International Movie Festival - Golden Lotus Award	Best Supporting Actor	Dapeng	Nominated
15th Macau International Movie Festival - Golden Lotus Award	Best Supporting Actress	Jiang Shuying	Nominated
15th Macau International Movie Festival - Golden Lotus Award	Best Cinematography	Cai Tao, Liao Ni	Nominated
15th Macau International Movie Festival - Golden Lotus Award	Best Newcomer	Wang Yibo	Nominated
17th Asian Film Awards	Best Newcomer	Wang Yibo	Nominated
