= Han Yan =

Chinese filmmaker (born 1983)

- Born: Shandong, China
- Education: Central Academy of Drama
- Occupations: Film director Screenwriter

Chinese name
- Simplified Chinese: 韩延
Transcriptions
Standard Mandarin
- Hanyu Pinyin: Hán Yán

Han Yan (Chinese: 韩延) is a Chinese film director and screenwriter. He is known for his films Go Away Mr. Tumor (2015), A Little Red Flower (2020 ) and Viva La Vida (2024).

== Filmography ==
Year	Title	Notes	Ref.
2012	First Time		
2015	Go Away Mr. Tumor		
2018	Animal World		
2020	A Little Red Flower		
2023	Love Never Ends		
2024	Viva La Vida		
2026	Per Aspera ad Astra		

== Awards and nominations ==
Year	Award	Category	Nominated Work	Result	Ref.
2021	Golden Rooster Awards	Best Director	A Little Red Flower	Nominated	
2024	Golden Rooster Awards	Best Director	Viva La Vida	Nominated	
2024	Golden Rooster Awards	Best Screenplay	Viva La Vida	Won	
2025	Huabiao Awards	Outstanding Director	Love Never Ends	Nominated	
