= The Wasted Times =

2016 Chinese-Hong Kong film by Cheng Er

- Poster
- Chinese: 罗曼蒂克消亡史
- Directed by: Cheng Er
- Written by: Cheng Er
- Produced by: Jason Siu; T.K. Yang; Dajun Zhang
- Starring: Ge You; Zhang Ziyi; Tadanobu Asano
- Cinematography: Jie Du
- Edited by: Cheng Er
- Music by: Shigeru Umebayashi; Sida Guo
- Production companies: Huayi Brothers Media Group; Haikou Hanyou Media
- Release date: December 16, 2016 (China)
- Countries: China; Hong Kong
- Languages: Shanghainese; Mandarin; Japanese
- Box office: CN¥104.9 million

The Wasted Times (simplified Chinese: 罗曼蒂克消亡史; traditional Chinese: 羅曼蒂克消亡史; pinyin: Luómàndìkè xiāowáng shǐ) is a 2016 thriller film directed by Cheng Er and starring Ge You, Zhang Ziyi and Tadanobu Asano. A Chinese-Hong Kong co-production, it was released in China and the United States on December 16, 2016.

== Plot ==
The movie depicts events commencing prior to the Japanese occupation of Shanghai between 1934 and the end of the war in 1945. The story arcs are told in a non-linear fashion and many events are re-told revealing the truth of what actually occurred. The central characters are a Chinese crime figure, Lu and his Japanese brother-in-law, Watabe.

The initial arc starts in Shanghai in 1937 in the eve of the Japanese invasion of Shanghai. Lu is introduced as an influential crime boss who works for Mr. Dai. His brother-in-law is Watabe who has two children and runs a local Japanese restaurant. There is tension between Japanese army as they wish for Dai and another local industrialist Zhang to support a Japanese bank being opened in Shanghai. Lu refuses but Zhang betrays him and sides with the Japanese, killing Lu's gang and family in the process. This results in a shootout in Watabe's restaurant with Watabe saving Lu's life by shooting one of the Japanese leaders, and in the process getting shot in the chest himself. Lu's sister is also killed and Lu takes charge of the two children and leaves Shanghai.

The second arc begins three years earlier and introduces Xiao Liu, who is married to Dai. Xiao Liu is a bored film actress who continues to have affairs much to the embarrassment of Mr. Dai. Lu is called upon to take care of the situation and cannot bring himself to kill Xiao Liu. Eventually they decide to move Xiao Liu out of Shanghai to northern China to save face for Dai. Watabe was assigned to take her to a train station in Suzhou.

The third arc in the story involves Wu, a famous actress. Wu's husband is also an actor but is not particular successful or good. Wu's husband is arrested by local police and she enlists the help of Mr. Dai. Mr. Dai is smitten by Wu. Wu is offered a high paying position for her husband outside of Shanghai with the implicit understanding that Wu would become Dai's mistress. She tries to reject the offer but is devastated when she learns her husband has accepted the offer already.

The next arc occurs 1941 in Hong Kong just prior to the Pacific War. Lu has settled there with Watabe's sons. Zhang who had betrayed Lu previously has been tracked down. Lu orders Zhang's assassination but in the process sacrifices Xiao Wu, his mistress.

The next arc of the story revisits the events of the shoot out and we learn that Watabe was not killed. We learned that he was sent by the Japanese army to infiltrate Shanghai and had been working with the Japanese to prepare for the invasion of Shanghai. He maintained his front of being a loyal family man but secretly continued to keep Xiao Liu imprisoned as a sex slave. After the events of shootout (and the subsequent occupation of Shanghai) Watabe reveals his Japanese persona and continues to keep Liu as a servant and sexual object. Watabe is sent to the frontlines and intends to kill Xiao Liu before he leaves. However he is not able to bring himself finish the act. Watabe is eventually taken as a prisoner of war in the Philippines in 1944.

The final arc of the story occurs just after the surrender of the Japanese in September 1945. Lu is in Shanghai in a post war asylum. He is taken to Xiao Liu. Xiao Liu recognizes Lu and smiles and goes to greet him. Lu remains stone faced and they leave the asylum together with Liu walking behind Lu. Lu is now at the POW camp where Watabe is kept in the Philippines. Lu wishes to extradite Watabe but Watabe has to sign a consent. Lu meets Watabe and presents him with the consent papers. Watabe spits on the papers (knowing full well he will be released back to Japan). Lu directs Watabe to look out the window where they see Xiao Liu with his two sons in the distance outside the camp. Watabe laughs in Lu's face saying he knows them and that they won't do anything to hurt his sons. Xiao Liu shoots and kill the older boy. Watabe relents and signs the consent forms. He is taken outside of the POW camp to where Xiao Liu and his remaining son is. Watabe tells his son to go to the POW camp and to tell them he is Japanese. The boy complies and is taken into the camp. Xiao Liu then shoots and kills Watabe. In the final scene, Lu is seen returning to Hong Kong alone.

== Cast ==
- Ge You as Mister Lu
- Zhang Ziyi as Xiao Liu
- Tadanobu Asano as Watabe
- Gillian Chung as Xiao Wu
- Du Chun as Killer
- Ni Dahong
- Yuan Quan
- Yan Ni
- Zhao Baogang
- Han Geng
- Huo Siyan
- Wallace Chung
- Wang Chuanjun
- Du Jiang
- Lv Xing
- Ash Gordey

== Release ==
The film was previously scheduled for release in China on October 3, 2015. It was released in China on December 16, 2016.

== Awards and nominations ==
Year(s)	Award(s)	Categories	Recipients	Results	Citation(s)
2017	11th Asian Film Awards	Best Cinematography	Du Jie	Nominated	
2017	11th Asian Film Awards	Best Costume Design	Kenneth Yee Chung-man	Nominated	
2017	24th Beijing College Student Film Festival	Best Film	The Wasted Times	Won	
2017	24th Beijing College Student Film Festival	Best Director	Cheng Er	Nominated	
2017	24th Beijing College Student Film Festival	Best Screenplay	Cheng Er	Nominated	
2017	31st Golden Rooster Awards	Best Director	Cheng Er	Nominated	
2017	31st Golden Rooster Awards	Best Cinematography	Du Jie	Nominated	
2017	31st Golden Rooster Awards	Best Sound	Zhu Yanfeng	Nominated	
2017	31st Golden Rooster Awards	Best Art Direction	Han Zhong	Nominated	
2017	17th Chinese Film Media Awards	Best Film	The Wasted Times	Nominated	
2017	17th Chinese Film Media Awards	Best Director	Cheng Er	Nominated	
2017	17th Chinese Film Media Awards	Best Actor	Ge You	Nominated	
2017	17th Chinese Film Media Awards	Best Actress	Zhang Ziyi	Nominated	
2017	17th Chinese Film Media Awards	Best Supporting Actor	Tadanobu Asano	Nominated	
2017	17th Chinese Film Media Awards	Best Supporting Actress	Gillian Chung	Nominated	
2017	17th Chinese Film Media Awards	Best Supporting Actress	Yan Ni	Nominated	
2017	9th Macau International Movie Festival	Best Director	Cheng Er	Nominated	
2017	9th Macau International Movie Festival	Best Actor	Ge You	Won	
2017	9th Macau International Movie Festival	Best Actress	Zhang Ziyi	Won	
2017	9th Macau International Movie Festival	Best Supporting Actor	Du Chun	Nominated	
2017	9th Macau International Movie Festival	Best Supporting Actress	Yan Ni	Nominated	
2017	9th Macau International Movie Festival	Best Newcomer	Lu Xing	Won	
2018	14th Changchun Film Festival	Best Actress	Zhang Ziyi	Won	

== Reception ==
The film has grossed CN¥104.9 million in China. According to the review aggregator website Rotten Tomatoes, 20% of critics have given the film a positive review based on 5 reviews, with an average rating of 5.5/10.
