= Wei Ren =

Professor of engineering

Wei Ren is a professor in Electrical and Computer Engineering at the University of California, Riverside.

== Awards ==
- He was Awarded the IEEE Control Systems Society Antonio Ruberti Young Researcher Prize in 2017 "For pioneering contributions to distributed coordination and control of multi-agent systems".
- He was named a Fellow of the Institute of Electrical and Electronics Engineers (IEEE) in 2016 for his contributions to distributed coordination and control of multi-agent systems.
