= Liu Jianwei =

Chinese novelist

- 柳建伟
- Born: October 1963 (age 62); Zhenping, Henan, China
- Education: People's Liberation Army College of Information Technology; People's Liberation Army College of Art; Lu Xun Literature Academy; Beijing Normal University
- Occupation: Novelist
- Writing career
- Pen name: Liu Shengyuan (柳盛元)
- Language: Chinese
- Period: 1985–present
- Genres: Novel, reportage
- Notable work: Heroic Time
- Notable awards: 6th Mao Dun Literature Prize; 2005 Heroic Time

Liu Jianwei (simplified Chinese: 柳建伟; traditional Chinese: 柳建偉; pinyin: Liǚ Jiànwěi; born October 1963), also known by his pen name Liu Shengyuan (柳盛元), is a Chinese novelist. He is best known for his novel Heroic Time which won the Mao Dun Literature Prize (2005), one of the most prestigious literature prizes in China.

== Biography ==
Liu was born in Zhenping County, Henan Province in 1963.

After the Cultural Revolution, Liu joined the People's Liberation Army. He graduated from People's Liberation Army College of Information Technology in 1983. After graduation, Liu worked in August First Film Studio.

Liu started to publish novels in 1985.

In 1991, Liu was accepted to People's Liberation Army College of Art and graduated in 1993. Then he entered Lu Xun Literature Academy. Liu was educated in Beijing Normal University from 1994 to 1997. After graduation, Liu worked in Chengdu Military Region.

In 2004, Liu was transferred to August First Film Studio.

== Works ==
=== Novels ===
- The Great Wall (北方城郭)
- Breakthrough (突出重围)
- Heroic Time (英雄时代)
- SARS Crisis (SARS危机)
- The Rock (石破惊天)
- The Terrifying Waves (惊涛骇浪)
- Love in the Anti-Japanese War (爱在战火纷飞时)

=== Reportages ===
- The Red Sun and the White Sun (红太阳白太阳)
- The Sun Comes Up in the East (日出东方)
- The World Is Not Enough (纵横天下)

== Awards ==
- Heroic Time – 6th Mao Dun Literature Prize (2005)
