= Chen Daming =

Chinese politician

Chen Daming (1919 – July 13, 2017), born Liang Ruikun, was a politician of the People's Republic of China. He was a native of Jinding, Xiangshan County, Guangdong (now part of Gaotang County Jinwan Town, Zhuhai City).

In June 1983, he was appointed Deputy Director of the Hong Kong Branch of Xinhua News Agency, responsible for overseeing the Social Work Department and the Cultural and Education Department. He retired in 1992 and authored the book Hong Kong Resistance.On July 13, 2017, at 1:36 a.m., he died in Guangzhou at the age of 98.
