= Xiong Dun =

Chinese cartoonist

- Xiong Dun, from a 2012 obituary.
- Born: Xiang Yao; 19 October 1982; Lishui, China
- Died: 16 November 2012 (aged 30)
- Occupations: Cartoonist, memoirist

Xiong Dun (熊頓) (19 October 1982 — 16 November 2012) was the pen-name of Xiang Yao (項瑤), a Chinese cartoonist, who documented her own experience with Non-Hodgkin lymphoma in her web comic Go to the Devil, Mr. Tumor. Her story was later adapted into a Chinese film, Go Away Mr. Tumor (Gun dan ba! Zhong liu jun) (2015).

== Early life ==
Xiang Yao was from Lishui in Zhejiang province.

== Career ==
Xiang Yao worked as an illustrator for Beijing advertising company, while creating comics using the name Xiong Dun, with titles like A Bachelorette's Diary, Superwoman on Diet, Stories in City, and Maturing into Womanhood. She had six books of her cartoons published. Her style was compared to that of Japanese cartoonist Naoko Takagi.

Xiong Dun began to experience symptoms that were diagnosed as Non-Hodgkin lymphoma in August 2011. She blamed her own long hours for her turn of health, saying "I hope my illness will sound alarm bells to those workaholics like me." Despite the grim subject, the cartoon published in book form as Go to the Devil, Mr. Tumor (2013) was upbeat in tone, with humorous illustrations and observations about her cancer and treatments.

== Personal life and legacy ==
Xiong Dun died in November 2012, aged 30. "Death is only a result," she assured her fans. "How you live is the most important." A film based on her life and work, Go Away Mr. Tumor, directed by Han Yan and starring Bai Baihe and Daniel Wu, was released in China in 2015, and was considered a box-office success. Wang Yichuan described it as an example of the "sorrow from joy" theme common in recent Chinese films.
