= Lethal Hostage =

- Traditional Chinese: 邊境風雲
- Simplified Chinese: 边境风云
- Hanyu Pinyin: Biānjìng Fēngyún
- Directed by: Cheng Er
- Written by: Cheng Er
- Produced by: Wang Dafang; Li Ming; Ning Hao
- Starring: Sun Honglei, Wang Luodan
- Edited by: Cheng Er
- Music by: Chen Weilun
- Production company: Seasonal Film Corporation
- Distributed by: Tianjin North Film Group
- Release date: 2012
- Running time: 109 minutes
- Country: China
- Language: Chinese

Lethal Hostage (边境风云) is 2012 Chinese crime thriller film, directed by Cheng Er, set on the China–Myanmar border.

== Plot ==
The film is about the relationship between Hong, a drug dealer, and Annie, his hostage. 10 years ago Annie's father was a dentist who worked with drug dealing gangsters however their plan went wrong when a mob boss was killed by police. His henchman Hong kidnapped ten-year-old Annie to Burma where he raised her as his daughter. Years later they ended up becoming lovers due to Stockholm syndrome. Before they could be married Hong faces one last job.

== Cast ==
- Sun Honglei
- Wang Luodan
- Ni Da-hong
- Zhang Mo
- Yang Kun
