= Go Away Mr. Tumor =

- Theatrical poster
- Directed by: Han Yan
- Written by: Yuan Yuan; Zhang Weizhong
- Produced by: Howard Chen; Li Liangwen; Tang Juan; Yue Xiang; Zhang Zihan
- Starring: Bai Baihe; Daniel Wu
- Cinematography: Charlie Lam
- Edited by: Meng Peicong; Yu Hongchao
- Music by: Hu Zi; Liu Wen
- Production company: Wanda Pictures
- Distributed by: China Lion (U.S.)
- Release date: August 13, 2015 (China)
- Running time: 128 minutes
- Country: China
- Language: Mandarin
- Box office: US$80.12 million

Go Away Mr. Tumor (Chinese: 滚蛋吧！肿瘤君) is 2015 Chinese comedy-drama film. It is based on the life of comic book artist Xiong Dun, who after her cancer diagnosis authored a popular webcomic that became a sensation in China. Xiong died in 2012 at the age of 30.

Directed by Han Yan and starring Bai Baihe and Daniel Wu, the film was released on August 13, 2015, and became a box office hit.

The film was selected as the Chinese entry for the Best Foreign Language Film at the 88th Academy Awards but it was not nominated.

Go Away, Mr. Tumor was featured in the 5th annual China International Co-Production Film Screenings, hosted by the Motion Picture Association of America and China's Film Bureau of the State Administration of Press, Publication, Radio, Film and Television.

== Cast ==
- Bai Baihe as Xiong Dun
- Daniel Wu as Doctor Liang
- Zhang Zixuan as Amy
- Li Yuan as Xia Meng
- Liu Ruilin as Xiao Xia
- Cheng Yi as Lao Zheng
- Li Jianyi as Xiong Dun's Father
- Liu Lili as Xiong Dun's Mother
- Shen Teng as Ex-boyfriend

== Box office ==
The film earned US$29.75 million in its opening weekend and topped the Chinese box office replacing Monster Hunt. Once advance ticket sales were factored in, Go Away Mr. Tumor registered a cume of US$31.52 million, with 182,066 showings and 5.46 million admissions in four days, according to data from the research group Entgroup.

== See also ==
- List of submissions to the 88th Academy Awards for Best Foreign Language Film
- List of Chinese submissions for the Academy Award for Best Foreign Language Film
