= Xia Gang =

Chinese film director (born 1953)

- Born: 1953 (age 71–72); Beijing, China
- Occupation(s): Film director & producer
- Years active: 1980s-present
- Awards: Golden Rooster Awards – Best Director: 1993 After Separation

Chinese name
- Traditional Chinese: 夏鋼
- Simplified Chinese: 夏钢
Transcriptions
Standard Mandarin
- Hanyu Pinyin: Xià Gāng

Xia Gang (Chinese: 夏钢; born 1953) is a Chinese film director. A graduate of the 1982 class of the Beijing Film Academy, Xia is a member of the so-called Fifth Generation, though unlike his classmates Tian Zhuangzhuang and Chen Kaige, he did not gain prominence until relatively later, in the late 1980s.

Like his contemporary Huang Jianxin, Xia's works have focused on modern urban relationships and particularly marriage and love. His film Yesterday's Wine (1995) is most indicative of his interest in modernity and relationships, as it details a young woman's maturation in a modern Chinese city.

== Selected filmography ==
=== As director ===
Year	English Title	Chinese Title	Notes
1989	Half Flame, Half Brine	一半是火焰，一半是海水	Adaptation of the novel by Wang Shuo
1991	The Unexpected Passion	遭遇激情	
1992	After Separation	大撒把	
1993	No More Applause	无人喝彩	Also known as No One Cheers
1995	Yesterday's Wine	与往事干杯	
1997	Concerto of Life	生命如歌	
2000	One Thousand Stars	一千颗星星	
2009	An Epic of a Woman	一个女人的史诗	Television series
