= Li Junxian (chemist) =

Chinese chemist (1928–2024)

- 李俊贤
- Born: 10 March 1928; Meishan County, Sichuan, China
- Died: 20 March 2024 (aged 96); Luoyang, Henan, China
- Education: Chengdu Textile College
- Spouse: Ding Dayun
- Scientific career
- Fields: Chemistry
- Workplaces: Liming Chemical Research Institute

Chinese name
- Simplified Chinese: 李俊贤
- Traditional Chinese: 李俊賢
Transcriptions
Standard Mandarin
- Hanyu Pinyin: Lǐ Jùnxián

Li Junxian (Chinese: 李俊贤; 10 March 1928 – 20 March 2024) was a Chinese chemist and an academician of the Chinese Academy of Engineering.

Li was a representative of the 15th National Congress of the Chinese Communist Party.

== Early life and career ==
Li was born into a family of farming background in Meishan County (now Meishan), Sichuan, on 10 March 1928. In 1947, he enrolled at National Central Technical College (now Chengdu Textile College), where he majored in chemical engineering.

After graduating in 1950, he became deputy director of Pilot Plant at Shenyang Chemical Research Institute of Northeast Chemical Bureau. He joined the Chinese Communist Party (CCP) in June 1956. He studied at the Russian Language Training Class of the Ministry of Chemical Industry between June 1956 and July 1957. He was transferred to the Beijing Institute of Chemical Engineering in January 1958 and eventually becoming director of the Research Room in January 1960. In June 1966, he was appointed chief engineer of Qinghai Liming Chemical Plant (later was reshuffled as Liming Chemical Research Institute), and served until October 1992. He also served as president from July 1979 to May 1983.

== Personal life and death ==
Li married Ding Dayun (丁大云) in 1959. On 20 March 2024, Li died of heart failure in Luoyang, Henan, at the age of 96.

== Honours and awards ==
- 1989 State Technological Invention Award (Third Class) for the synthesis process of high-purity unsymmetrical dimethylhydrazine by chloramine method
- 1995 State Science and Technology Progress Award (Second Class) for the research on liquid unit based propellants such as Yutu-3
- 1995 Member of the Chinese Academy of Engineering (CAE)

Academic offices
New title	President of Liming Chemical Research Institute; 1979–1983	Succeeded by Ding Defu (丁德富)
New title	Chief Engineer of Liming Chemical Research Institute; 1979–1992	Succeeded by Hu Zhongwei (胡忠伟)
