= Cheng Er =

Chinese film director, scriptwriter and editor

- 程耳
- Born: 17 August 1976 (age 50)
- Education: Beijing Film Academy
- Occupations: Film director, screenwriter, editor, writer
- Years active: 2006–present

Cheng Er (Chinese: 程耳; born 17 August 1976) is a Chinese film director, scriptwriter, editor, and writer best known for his thriller films Lethal Hostage, The Wasted Times, and Hidden Blade.

== Early life and education ==
Cheng graduated from the Directing Department of Beijing Film Academy in 1999. His graduation short film "Criminals" (Chinese: 犯罪分子), shot with a 35mm camera, was the most successful market-oriented student work of the Beijing Film Academy since its establishment.

== Career ==
Cheng is known for adopting a non-linear timeline narrative in his films and often triggered controversy as his films were too 'literary and obscure' for the general audience. Cheng is one of the few Chinese directors in his generation who directs, script-write and edit his own films. He is the only director to be nominated for three categories for the Golden Rooster Awards since its establishment, and the only one to win under two categories in the same year.

== Filmography ==
Year	English title	Chinese title	Role
2012	Lethal Hostage	边境风云	Director, Scriptwriter, Editor
2016	The Wasted Times	罗曼蒂克消亡史	Director, Scriptwriter, Editor
2023	Hidden Blade	无名	Director, Scriptwriter, Editor
2024	Intercross	人鱼	Director, Scriptwriter, Editor

== Awards and nominations ==
Award	Category	Work	Result
36th Golden Rooster Awards	Best Screenplay	Hidden Blade	Nominated
36th Golden Rooster Awards	Best Director	Hidden Blade	Won
36th Golden Rooster Awards	Best Editing	Hidden Blade	Won
