= Journey to the West (2021 film) =

- Chinese release poster
- Directed by: Dashan Kong
- Written by: Dashan Kong; Yitong Wang
- Screenplay by: Dashan Kong; Roy Wang; Yitong Wang
- Based on: Journey to the West (inspiration)
- Produced by: Gong Geer
- Starring: Haoyu Yang; Liya Ai; Jiang Qiming; Yitong Wang
- Cinematography: Matthias Delvaux
- Edited by: Shuzhen Hu
- Music by: Zixu Su
- Production company: G!FILM Studio Co LTD
- Release date: October 17, 2021 (Pingyao International Film Festival)
- Running time: 117 minutes
- Country: China
- Language: Mandarin
- Box office: $9.5 million

Journey to the West (Chinese: 宇宙探索编辑部; pinyin: Yǔzhòu tànsuǒ biānjí bù; lit. 'Universe Exploration Editorial Department') is a 2021 Chinese film written and directed by Dashan Kong in his feature film debut. The English title is inspired by the 16th century Chinese literary classic of the same name. It had its world premiere at the 5th Pingyao International Film Festival in October 2021, with broader release in 2023.

== Premise ==
For his entire life, purported UFO sightings have proven false, and TV static in his crumbling apartment has been devoid of any hidden transmissions. Nevertheless, aging Tang Zhijun continues to believe in aliens, doing odd jobs such as lecturing in psychiatric hospitals to be able to afford the publication of his small space-exploration magazine and rented office space in Beijing. After watching a mysterious video online from Sichuan, Tang heads to mountainous Southwestern China to investigate, accompanied by one of his cynical staffers, an alcoholic weatherman, and a woman with insomnia who happens to be the same age as his daughter. The group of misfits eventually meets an eccentric, young poet named Sun Yitong in a remote village who claims to have received instructions from aliens, and decides to follow him on a journey. This story is not one of the fabled Monkey King, but is about an ordinary man's continuous pursuit of UFOs and the human condition of chasing faded love.

== Production ==
The film was produced on a small budget, and combines genres of soft science fiction, comedy, mystery, and road movies to tell a reimagined story of the Chinese classic, Journey to the West, via a faux-documentary style that eventually gives way to dramatic storytelling.

Chinese sci-fi director Frant Gwo served as one of the film's executive producers, helped with its funding, and appears in a minor cameo role.

== Release ==
Following its premiere at the Pingyao International Film Festival, it also screened in at the Jeonju International Film Festival, Osaka Asian Film Festival, and International Film Festival Rotterdam the following year. The film was released theatrically to wider audiences in China on April 1, 2023, and had limited release in North America via the CineCina Film Festival on April 22, 2023.

== Reception ==
The film won four awards at 5th Pingyao International Film Festival in 2021, including Best Film at the Fei Mu Awards, the Youth Jury Grand Award, Cinephilia Critics' Award, and People's Choice Award. It was the most popular film at the festival and was the first to see all its tickets sell out.

As of April 2023, the film is ranked as one of China's highest-rated sci-fi films with an 8.4 out of 10 score on Douban.
