= Storyline method =

Education strategy

The Storyline method is a pedagogical strategy for "active learning," mainly used in primary schools in Scotland, the United States, Scandinavia and the Netherlands. The system can be adapted for use in adult education as well. It was pioneered by the staff of the Inservice Department of the Jordanhill College of Education in Glasgow, now University of Strathclyde.

== History ==
In 1965, the “Primary Memorandum” demanded that primary schools have a curriculum that integrated different subjects - history, geography, science, technology, health and expressive arts. At that time, teachers had little experience in teaching an integrated study such as this, so strategies had to be developed providing structures on which teachers could build. The attempt to implement the holistic ideas into the Primary Memorandum led to the creation, in 1967, in Jordanhill College of Education, Glasgow, of an Inservice Staff Tutor Team, whose function was to support teachers by working with them on this integrated curriculum. Many teachers, head teachers and advisers in the west of Scotland helped to refine and develop this methodology over a period of more than thirty years. Gradually, a particular methodology emerged that was originally called Topic Work, and is now known more widely, also internationally, as Storyline.

Pioneers of the approach were staff tutors Steve Bell, Sallie Harkness and Fred Rendell. As the Jordanhill tutors travelled abroad, the approach became known in Germany, in the Netherlands, in Iceland and in Denmark – in later years in all Scandinavian countries as well as in the United States of America.

In 1986, at a chance meeting of educators in Iceland, it was suggested that an international association should be created, so the European association for Educational Design (EED) was formed and the following year, the first seminar was held at the headquarters of the National Institute for Curriculum Development (SLO) in Enschede, the Netherlands. Since then, there have been meetings in Germany, Denmark, Scotland, Iceland, Norway and the Netherlands.

For the tenth anniversary, an international conference attended by over 300 participants from 22 countries was held in Aalborg, Denmark from 6 to 8 November 2000. The 2nd International Storyline Conference was held in 2003 near Copenhagen, the 3rd in Glasgow, 2006, the 4th in Portland, Oregon, 2009, the 5th in Reykjavik, 2012, the 6th in Glasgow, 2015, the 7th in Ljubljana, 2018. The 8th International Storyline Conference will be held in 2021 in Gothenburg, Sweden. In March, 2020, a Siberian International Storyline Conference will be held in Tomsk.

At present, the approach is widely used in Scotland, the Scandinavian countries, the USA and in the Netherlands, but also in a number of other countries, such as Thailand, Hong Kong, Singapore, Lithuania, Greece, Turkey and Portugal.

== System ==
The main feature that differentiates this approach from other learning and teaching strategies is that it recognises the value of the existing knowledge of the learner. Thus, through key questioning, the pupils are encouraged to construct their own models of what is being studied, their hypotheses, before testing them with real evidence and research. The key questions are used in a sequence that generally creates a context within the framework of a story. Together, learner and teacher create a scenario through visualisation; the making of collages, three-dimensional models and pictures employing a variety of art and craft techniques. These provide a visual stimulus for the skill-practice planned by the teacher. Teachers do not know the details of the content, even as they plan a sequence of activities through the designing of key questions.

The traditional role of the teacher, who had power because of superior knowledge, is changed. It is no longer her job to pass on information to the students - a body of knowledge to be learned and assimilated. Storyline is rather about process and not merely about content. The teacher’s role is mainly that of a facilitator.

Teachers also often implement the Launch, Explore, Summarize (LES) method. In the Launch phase, teacher uncovers past knowledge by asking questions relating to the subject matter to the student. In the Explore phase a story is read to a student which is followed by discussion on the contents of it. Lastly, in the Summarize phase the teacher looks back on the stimulus introduced through the Launch phase and helps the student to find connections between it and the contents of the story.

While the storyline method takes time and patience, over many episodes or lessons, using it results in a growth of critical thinking, commitment, and a student's general knowledge.

== Literature ==
- Bell, Steve / Harkness, Sallie / White, Graham (ed.): Storyline – Past, Present & Future. Glasgow (Enterprising Careers, University of Srathclyde) 2007.
- Bell, Steve / Harkness, Sallie: Storyline – Promoting Language Across the Curriculum. (UKLA Minibook series) Royston 2006.
- Creswell, Jeff: Creating Worlds, Constructing Meaning: The Scottish Storyline Method. Portsmouth, NH 1997.
- Fifield, Kathy/Creswell, Jeff: Storyline I: An Introduction. Portland, Oregon (Educational Resources Northwest) 1991.
- Karlsen, K. H., Lockhart-Pedersen, V., & Bjørnstad, G. B. (2019). “… but, it's really grown on me, Storyline, as practical as it has been”: A critical inquiry of student teachers' experiences of The Scottish Storyline Approach in teacher education. Teaching and Teacher Education, 77, 150-159.
- Karlsen, K. H., Høeg, H. R., & Høeg, E. (2020). Cooperative Learning: The Power of Positive Interdependence in Storyline. I K.H. Karlsen & M. H. Häggström (Red.). Teaching through Stories: Renewing the Scottish Storyline Approach in Teacher Education, 33-59. Münster: Waxmann
- Karlsen, K.H., & Häggström, M. (2020). Teaching through Stories. Renewing the Scottish Storyline Approach in Teacher Education. Münster: Waxmann.
- Karlsen, K. H., & Lockhart-Pedersen, V. (2020). Story-based Cross-Curricular Teaching and Learning: A Systematic Mapping of the Research Literature on The Scottish Storyline Approach. Teaching through Stories: Renewing the Scottish Storyline Approach in Teacher Education. I K.H. Karlsen & M. Häggström (Red.). Teaching through Stories. Renewing the Scottish Storyline Approach in Teacher Education, 393-432. Münster: Waxmann.
- Letschert, Jos et al.: Topic Work. A Storyline Approach. Enschede (SLO Institut for Curriculum Development) 1992.
- Letschert, Jos et al. (ed.): Beyond Storyline. Features, principles and pedagogical profundity. Enschede (SLO) 2006.
- Omand, Carol: Storyline: creative learning across the curriculum (UKLA) 2014
- Omand, Carol: Storyline: Developing Effective Questioning 2017
- Rendell, Fred: Topic Study, How and Why? Glasgow (Jordanhill College of Education).
