= Endless Journey =

2023 Chinese film by Chen Sicheng

- Theatrical release poster
- Traditional Chinese: 三大隊
- Simplified Chinese: 三大队
- Literal meaning: The Third Squad
- Hanyu Pinyin: Sān dàduì
- Directed by: Dai Mo
- Screenplay by: Zhang Ji
- Based on: Please Tell the Director: The Mission of Brigade Three Has Been Completed by Shen Lan
- Produced by: Chen Sicheng
- Starring: Zhang Yi; Li Chen; Wei Chen; Cao Bingkun; Wang Xiao; Zhang Zixian
- Cinematography: Dong Jinsong
- Edited by: Yang Hongyu; Tang Hongjia
- Music by: Peng Fei
- Production companies: Wanda Pictures (Hainan) Co., Ltd.; Beijing Yitong Legend Film & TV Culture Co., Ltd.; Beijing Anrui Film & TV Culture Media Co., Ltd.; China Film Group Corporation; Shanghai Tao Piaopiao Film & TV Culture Co., Ltd.
- Release date: December 15, 2023
- Running time: 132 minutes
- Country: China
- Language: Mandarin
- Box office: US$89.4 million

Endless Journey (Chinese: 三大队; lit. 'The Third Squad') is a 2023 Chinese crime drama film produced by Chen Sicheng and directed by Dai Mo. The film stars Zhang Yi, Li Chen, Wei Chen, Cao Bingkun, Wang Xiao, and Zhang Zixian. It is adapted from the non-fiction short story "Please Tell the Director, the Mission of the Third Squad Is Complete" by Shen Lan.

== Plot summary ==
In 2002, a brutal case of home invasion, rape, and murder shocks Taiping, Guangdong. The Third Criminal Investigation Squad, led by Captain Cheng Bing, vows to crack the case within five days. The investigation quickly targets brothers Wang Dayong and Wang Eryong, who disguise themselves as air conditioner repairmen. During the pursuit, Cheng's mentor Zhang collapses from a cerebral hemorrhage.

After Wang Dayong is arrested and blames his brother for the crime, he mocks Cheng by smirking at a photo of Cheng's daughter. Enraged, the squad beats him, resulting in Wang's death. The squad is later convicted of extorting confessions through torture and were imprisoned, losing their police status.

In 2009, Cheng is released from prison. The former squad members have gone their separate ways. Cheng persuades them to reunite and continue pursuing Wang Eryong as civilians. They take on various jobs—security guard, internet café staff, AC repair—to broaden their reach. Over time, each member departs due to personal reasons, leaving only Cheng.

In 2013, now working as a water deliveryman, Cheng tracks Wang Eryong to Tongren, Guizhou. A fight ensues and both are taken to the police. A DNA comparison result confirms Wang's identity, and he is arrested. A police officer assures Cheng that a solid evidence chain is enough for conviction, even without a testimony. As Cheng leaves, he reports: the mission of the Third Squad is complete.

== Cast ==
Actor	Role	Description
Zhang Yi	Cheng Bing	Captain of the Third Criminal Investigation Squad in Taiping. Sentenced to 8 years in prison after Wang Dayong's death. After release, he travels across China in various jobs to track Wang Eryong, eventually locating him in Guizhou.
Li Chen	Yang Jiantao	Captain of the Second Squad. Collaborates with Cheng on the 9.21 case and later becomes the police chief of Taiping.
Wei Chen	Xu Yizhou	Youngest member of the Third Squad and a police academy graduate. Sentenced to 6 years. After release, works with dogs and joins Cheng's search. Falls in love in Deyang, Sichuan, and eventually leaves the mission to start a family in Maoming, Guangdong.
Cao Bingkun	Cai Bin	Third Squad member. Sentenced to 5 years. Opens a street-side antique shop post-release. Leaves the team after being diagnosed with stomach cancer in Xishuangbanna, Yunnan—the last to leave besides Cheng.
Wang Xiao	Ma Zhenkun	Third Squad member. Sentenced to 5 years. Runs a food stall with his wife. Leaves the mission due to family reasons in Changsha, Hunan.
Zhang Zixian	Liao Jian	Third Squad member. Sentenced to 5 years and disowned by his family. Sells insurance with his son after release. Leaves the mission due to homesickness in Shenyang, Liaoning.
Yang Xinming	Zhang Qingliang	Veteran Third Squad member and Cheng's mentor. Dies from a cerebral hemorrhage during the initial investigation.
Zhang Benyu	Wang Eryong	One of the perpetrators of the 9.21 case. Takes a new identity and starts a family. Captured in Tongren, Guizhou. Sentenced to death for rape and intentional injury.

== Production ==
At the end of 2018, Wanda Pictures acquired the adaptation rights for Shen Lan's short story. The project was later recommended to Chen Sicheng's production company, Yiteng Studio.

On January 30, 2022, the China Film Administration announced the film's official approval. Filming began on October 25, 2022, and wrapped in Shenyang on December 22.

== Reception ==
=== Box office ===
The film grossed 706 million yuan in China.

=== Accolades ===
Year	Award	Category	Recipient(s)	Result	Ref.
2024	China Film Directors Guild Commendations 2020–2023	Film of the Year (2023)	Endless Journey	Nominated	
2024	19th Changchun Film Festival Golden Deer Awards	Best Film	Endless Journey	Nominated	
2024	19th Changchun Film Festival Golden Deer Awards	Best Screenplay	Zhang Ji	Nominated	
2025	20th Huabiao Awards	Outstanding Film	Endless Journey	Won	
2025	20th Huabiao Awards	Outstanding Actor	Zhang Yi	Won	
2025	20th Huabiao Awards	Outstanding Composer	Peng Fei	Won	
