= Huabiao Award for Outstanding Actor =

Annual Chinese film award

The Huabiao Award for Outstanding Actor was first awarded in 1995.

== Winners & nominations ==
=== 2020s ===
Year	Number	Actor	Film
2025	20th	Zhang Yi	Endless Journey
2025	20th	Wang Yibo	One and Only
2023	19th	Liu Ye	Island Keeper
2023	19th	Jackson Yee	Nice View
2020	18th (Note: The awards ceremony was held on May 23, 2023 alongside 19th ceremony instead of in late 2020 due to COVID-19.)	Zhang Yi	My People, My Country
2020	18th	Zhang Hanyu	The Captain

=== 2010s ===
Year	Number	Actor	Film
2018	17th	Wu Jing	Wolf Warrior 2
2018	17th	Liu Peiqi	The War Of Loong
2015	16th	Andy Lau	Lost and Love
2015	16th	Zhang Hanyu	The Taking of Tiger Mountain
2013	15th	Huang Xiaoming	American Dreams in China
2013	15th	Liu Zhibing	Loyalty and Betrayal
2013	15th	Wang Jingchun	The Police Diary
2013	15th	Sun Weimin	The Story of Zhou Enlai
2011	14th	Ge You	Sacrifice
2011	14th	Li Xuejian	Yang Shanzhou
2011	14th	Wang Xueqi	Bodyguards and Assassins
2011	14th	Liu Zhitian	Shen Zhou 11

=== 2000s ===
Year	Number	Actor	Film
2009	13th	Zhang Hanyu	Assembly
2009	13th	Guo Jinglin	Yuan Longping
2009	13th	Wu Gang	Iron Man
2009	13th	Sun Min	Deng Pingshou
2007	12th	Chen Kun	The Knot
2007	12th	Fu Dalong	The Forest Ranger
2007	12th	Feng Gong	《别拿自己不当干部》
2007	12th	Wang Wufu	On the Mountain of Tai Hang
2005	11th	Pu Cunxin	The Full Moon
2005	11th	Wu Jun	Zhang Side
2005	11th	Luo Deyuan	The Silent Mountains
2005	11th	Xie Gang	The Tide
2004	10th	Liu Wei	Defending Reputation
2004	10th	Zhou Xiaobin	Unforgettable
2004	10th	Guo Xiaodong	Nuan
2004	10th	Jiang Wen	Warriors of Heaven and Earth
2004	10th	Huang Lei	38°
2003	9th	Liu Peiqi	Together
2003	9th	Lu Qi	Deng Xiaoping
2003	9th	Tian Chengren	Warm Spring
2003	9th	吐依贡·阿合买提	《库尔班大叔上北京》
2003	9th	Li Youbin	The Flood
2002	8th	Hou Yong	Charging Out Amazon
2002	8th	Wang Ying	Mao Zedong in 1925
2001	7th	Wang Xueqi	To be With You Forever
2001	7th	Wang Qingxiang	Final Decision
2000	6th	Chen Daoming	My 1919
2000	6th	Li Xuejian	Fight Bomb

=== 1990s ===
Year	Number	Actor	Film
1999	5th	Zhao Benshan	Male Sorority Director
1999	5th	Shao Bing	Rhapsody of Spring
1998	4th	Tang Guoqiang	Long March
1997	3rd	Fu Xuecheng	Great Transformation
1997	3rd	Liu Peiqi	The Days Without Lei Feng
1996	2nd	Gao Ming	Kong Fansen
1995	1st	Li Rentang	The Accused uncle Shang Gang
