= The Great Military March Forward: Engulf the Southwest =

- DVD cover
- Traditional Chinese: 大進軍席捲大西南
- Simplified Chinese: 大进军席卷大西南
- Hanyu Pinyin: Dàjìnjūn Xíjuǎn Dàxīnán
- Directed by: Song Yeming; Zhu Jianming
- Written by: Lu Zhuguo
- Produced by: Zhang Shuangbo; Liu Guangjun; Shang Changyi; Xu Gang
- Starring: Fu Xuecheng; Lu Qi; Gu Yue; Zhao Hengduo
- Cinematography: Dong Yachun; Wang Weidong; Li Bingkun
- Edited by: Nie Weiguo; Huang Weifu
- Music by: Yang Xiwu
- Production company: August First Film Studio
- Distributed by: Mei Ah Laser Disc Co., LTD.
- Release date: 24 September 1998 (China)
- Running time: 145 minutes
- Country: China
- Language: Mandarin

The Great Military March Forward: Engulf the Southwest (Chinese: 大进军席卷大西南), also known as The Liberation of Southwest China, is a 1998 Chinese epic war film directed by Song Yeming and Zhu Jianming and written by Lu Zhuguo. The film stars Fu Xuecheng, Lu Qi, Gu Yue, and Zhao Hengduo. The film is about the war between the Communist troops and the KMT troops in southwest China during the Chinese Civil War.

== Plot ==
In September 1949, after the three major campaigns (Liaoshen Campaign, Huaihai Campaign and Pingjin Campaign), the People's Liberation Army (PLA) has basically achieved control over the provinces and cities of mainland China, the KMT troops are evacuated to Chongqing, Mao Zedong and Zhu De plan to make a final battle against the Kuomintang, soon the war in southwest China's Sichuan, Chongqing break out, the People's Liberation Army defeat the KMT troops, the KMT troops is forced to retreat to Taiwan.

== Cast ==
=== Main ===
- Fu Xuecheng as Liu Bocheng
- Lu Qi as Deng Xiaoping
- Gu Yue as Mao Zedong
- Zhao Hengduo as Chiang Kai-shek

=== Supporting ===
- Xu Guangming as Hu Zongnan
- Wang Fengbin as Song Xilian
- Wang Lanwu as Li Da
- Gao Changli as He Long
- Liu Huaizheng as Zhu De
- Peng Zhidong as Wang Tiehan
- Hu Xilong as Chen Kefei
- Wang Jingwen as Zhong Bin
- Qin Zhao as Chiang Ching-kuo
- Wang Hui as Luo Lie
- Yang Ciyu as Liu Wenhui
- Ding Jingyi as Deng Xihou
- Weng Xianqiao as Zhang Qun
- Zhao Zhi as Li Wen
- Li Guohua as Luo Guangwen
- Guan Shouyi as Pei Changhui
- Tang Gaoqi as Zhang Boying
- Yao Jude

== Release ==
The Great Military March Forward: Engulf the Southwest was released in China on September 24, 1998.

== Accolades ==
Date	Award	Category	Recipient(s) and nominee(s)	Result	Notes
1998	4th Huabiao Awards	Outstanding Film	The Great Military March Forward: Engulf the Southwest	Won	
1998	4th Huabiao Awards	Outstanding Director	Song Yeming and Zhu Jianming	Won	
1998	4th Huabiao Awards	Excellent Film Technology	The Great Military March Forward: Engulf the Southwest	Won	
1998	18th Golden Rooster Awards	Best Writing	Lu Zhuguo	Won	
1998	18th Golden Rooster Awards	Special Jury Prize	The Great Military March Forward: Engulf the Southwest	Won	
