= Marshal Peng Dehuai (TV series) =

Chinese name
- Traditional Chinese: 彭德懷元帥
- Simplified Chinese: 彭德怀元帅
Transcriptions
Standard Mandarin
- Hanyu Pinyin: Péng Déhuái Yuánshuaì
- Genre: Biographical, historical
- Written by: Ma Jihong; Gao Jun; Xu Jiang
- Directed by: Song Yeming
- Starring: Dong Yong; Yang Tongshu; Tang Guoqiang; Liu Jing; Wang Wufu; Luo Gang
- Opening theme: Great Hero by Tang Fei
- Ending theme: Camellia by Lei Jia
- Country of origin: China
- Original language: Mandarin
- No. of seasons: 1
- No. of episodes: 36

Production
- Executive producer: Nie Chenxi
- Production locations: Hebei, Shanxi, Zhejiang, Shandong
- Production companies: Shiji Changlong Film and Television Co., Ltd. Shanghai Film Group; Fujian Media Group

Original release
- Network: CCTV-1
- Release: May 20 – June 16, 2016

Marshal Peng Dehuai (Chinese: 彭德怀元帅) is a 2016 Chinese biographical historical drama television series directed by Song Yeming and written by Ma Jihong, Gao Jun and Xu Jiang, based on the life of Peng Dehuai (1898-1974), a prominent Chinese Communist military leader during the 20th century. The series stars Dong Yong as Peng Dehuai, alongside Yang Tongshu, Tang Guoqiang, Liu Jing, Wang Wufu, and Luo Gang.

== Synopsis ==
This drama describes the life of Peng Dehuai (1898-1974), one of the Ten Marshals of the People's Republic of China.

== Cast ==
=== Communist Party characters ===
- Dong Yong as Peng Dehuai, Communist military leader.
- Yang Tongshu as Pu Anxiu, Peng's wife.
- Tang Guoqiang as Mao Zedong, Communist Party leader and chairman of the Central Committee of the Chinese Communist Party.
  - Luo Gang as young Mao Zedong.
- Liu Jing as Zhou Enlai, Communist Party leader and Prime Minister of the State Council of the People's Republic of China.
- Wang Wufu as Zhu De, commander in chief of the Red Army.
  - Zhang Jingsheng as young Zhu De.
- Luo Gang as Zuo Quan, a senior military figure who died in the war.
- Wang Pengkai as Xi Zhongxun
- Michelle Bai (Bai Bing) as Qi Xin, Xi Zhongxun's wife.

=== Kuomintang characters ===
- Ma Xiaowei as Chiang Kai-shek
- Wen Xin as Soong May-ling
- Yang Meng as He Yingqin
- Xu Yongge as Hu Zongnan
- Cheng Yu as Yan Xishan

=== Supporting ===
- Sun Jiajia as Peng Gang (彭钢), Peng's niece.
- Shan Wenxian as Peng Meikui (彭梅魁), Peng's niece.
- Liu Sibo as Peng Qichao (彭启超), Peng's nephew.
- Pu Cunxin as Yang Xianzhen, president of the Central Party School of the Chinese Communist Party.
- Lu Zhong as Huang Gonglue, Peng's brothers in arms and close friend.
- Song Yu as Guo Bingsheng
- Zhao Jun as Mao Anying, Mao's son.
- Zhang Zaixin as Liu Bocheng, division commander of the 129th division.
- Liu Jian as Chen Geng
- Shi Xin as Deng Xiaoping
- Wang Jian as Ren Bishi
- Chen Shanshan as Lin Biao
- Wang Yingxin as Nie Rongzhen
- Li Xinhua as Yang Shangkun
- Ma Yan as Wang Zhen
- Wang Zhuo as Ye Ting
- Zhou Bo as Teng Daiyuan
- Su Yujie as Shi Tou
- Ai Dong as Deng Hua
- Zhao Ji as Li Jiyun
- Yasuyuki Hirata as Yasuji Okamura, commander-in-chief of the Japanese Northern China Area Army.
- Ding Haifeng as Zhang Xueliang
- Zhu Haijun as He Changgong
- Zhang Huizhong as Wei Lihuang
- Fu Yong as Jin Ruilong
- Xie Zibing as Liu Yue
- Cao Li as Duan Dechang
- Miao Qing as Qiu'er
- Li Jiaming as Song Weiguo
- Tang Yinuo as Jing Xizhen
- Jiang Jing as Liu Yan
- Liu Yijun

== Production ==
In 2010s, the Peng Dehuai Memorial Hall, the TV Art Center of the General Logistics Department of the PLA and the CCTV Production Center were planning TV series about Peng Dehuai. Xi Jinping (General Secretary of the Central Committee of the Chinese Communist Party), Fan Changlong (Vice Chairman of the Central Military Commission), Xu Qiliang (Vice Chairman of the Central Military Commission), and Liu Yuan (general) agreed the project.

In the autumn of 2014, Ren Zhonglun (任仲伦), the CEO of Shanghai Film Group, hired Ma Jihong (马继红) to write the script for the series. On January 6, 2015, Zhou Xuzhou (周旭洲), the CEO of Hong Kong Yuye Group, signed a 15 million yuan investment agreement and also sponsored 2 million yuan in his own name. In December 2014, Song Yeming (Charging Out Amazon) was signed to direct the series.

Dong Yong was cast as the lead role Peng Dehuai, he said in an interview: "My parents once took part in the Korean War (1950-1953), they have deep feelings about Peng Dehuai. It is the first time that I play a great man, and it is both pressure and motivation for myself." Before playing Peng Dehuai, he read 11 biographies of Peng.

Production started on 20 December 2014 and ended on 20 May 2015. Most of the film was shot on location in Hebei, Shanxi, Zhejiang, and Shandong. Zhao Nanqi (general) and Liu Yuan serves as its general counsel.

== Music ==
| No. | Title | Lyrics | Music | Singers | Length |
|---|---|---|---|---|---|
| 1. | "Great Hero (《大英雄》)" (Opening theme) | Quan Yuan | Wang Liguang | Tang Fei |
| 2. | "Camellia (《山茶花》)" (Ending theme) | Ji Chuchen | Wang Liguang | Lei Jia |

== Broadcast ==
Marshal Peng Dehuai was broadcast on CCTV-1 in May 2016.

The series received mainly positive reviews. Kong Li (孔鲤) of thepaper said: "The series shaped a flesh and blood hero: Peng Dehuai". Li Zhun, a Mao Dun Literary Prize laureate, said: "This is a breakthrough success in the creation of Peng Dehuai's film and TV dramas, and it is an important harvest for the creation of the major historical revolution." Zhong Chengxiang (仲呈祥), the former vice president of the China Federation of Literary and Art Circles (CFLAC) said: "This work completely reproduces the artistic image of Marshal Peng Dehuai in front of today's audience."

=== Accolades ===
| Date | Award | Category | Recipient(s) and nominee(s) | Result | Notes |
|---|---|---|---|---|---|
| 2017 | 23rd Shanghai TV Festival | Best Chinese TV series | Marshal Peng Dehuai | Nominated | |
| 2017 | 23rd Shanghai TV Festival | Committee Special Award | Marshal Peng Dehuai | Won | |
| 2017 | "Five Aspects Project" Award | | Marshal Peng Dehuai | Won | |
| 2018 | 31st Flying Apsaras Awards | Outstanding Director | Song Yeming | Nominated | |
| 2018 | 31st Flying Apsaras Awards | Outstanding Writer | Ma Jihong | Nominated | |
| 2018 | 31st Flying Apsaras Awards | Outstanding Actor | Dong Yong | Nominated | |
| 2018 | 31st Flying Apsaras Awards | Outstanding Television Series Based on Significant Events | Marshal Peng Dehuai | Won | |
