= 31st Flying Apsaras Awards =

The 31st Flying Apsaras Awards (simplified Chinese: 第31届中国电视剧飞天奖; traditional Chinese: 第31屆中國電視劇飛天獎) were held in Ningbo, Zhejiang, China, on April 3, 2018. Nominees and winners are listed below, winners are in bold.

== Winners and nominees ==
Outstanding Director	Outstanding Writer
Chen Li–**My Uncle Zhou Enlai** (海棠依旧); Liu Jin–White Deer Plain (白鹿原); Zhang Yongxin–The Advisors Alliance (大军师司马懿之军师联盟) and Housing (安居); Song Yeming–Marshal Peng Dehuai (彭德怀元帅); Wang Jun–A Love For Separation (小别离)	Shen Jie–**White Deer Plain** (白鹿原) and **Feather Flies To The Sky** (鸡毛飞上天); Chang Jiang–The Advisors Alliance (大军师司马懿之军师联盟); Ma Jihong–Marshal Peng Dehuai (彭德怀元帅); Qian Linsen–Heroes of Defense (绝命后卫师); He Qing–A Love For Separation (小别离)
Outstanding Actor	Outstanding Actress
**Zhang Tong**–**Heroes of Defense** (绝命后卫师); Zhang Yi–Feather Flies To The Sky (鸡毛飞上天); Sun Weimin–My Uncle Zhou Enlai (海棠依旧); Yu Hewei–Police Captain (刑警队长) and The Advisors Alliance (大军师司马懿之军师联盟); Dong Yong–Marshal Peng Dehuai (彭德怀元帅)	**Sun Li**–**Nothing Gold Can Stay** (那年花开月正圆); Qin Hailu–White Deer Plain (白鹿原); Liu Tao–Ode to Joy (欢乐颂) and The Advisors Alliance (大军师司马懿之军师联盟); Jiang Xin–Ode to Joy (欢乐颂); Yin Tao–Feather Flies To The Sky (鸡毛飞上天)
Outstanding Historical Television Series	Outstanding Modern Television Series
**Yu Chenglong** (于成龙); **White Deer Plain** (白鹿原); **The Advisors Alliance** (大军师司马懿之军师联盟); **Nothing Gold Can Stay** (那年花开月正圆)	**Feather Flies To The Sky** (鸡毛飞上天); **Deep Sword** (深海利剑); **Police Captain** (刑警队长); **Ode to Joy** (欢乐颂); **Housing** (安居); **A Love For Separation** (小别离)
Outstanding Television Series Based on Significant Events	
**My Uncle Zhou Enlai** (海棠依旧); **Marshal Peng Dehuai** (彭德怀元帅); **Heroes of Defense** (绝命后卫师); **Yihai Alliance** (彝海结盟); **Blood Flag** (热血军旗); **38th Parallel** (三八线)	
