= Mao Zedong 1949 =

- Film poster
- Traditional Chinese: 決勝時刻
- Simplified Chinese: 决胜时刻
- Hanyu Pinyin: Juéshèng Shíkè
- Directed by: Huang Jianxin; Ning Haiqiang
- Written by: He Jiping; Huang Xin; Wang Qingwei
- Produced by: Huang Jianxin
- Starring: Tang Guoqiang; Liu Jing; Huang Jingyu; Wang Likun
- Production company: Bona Film Group Limited
- Distributed by: Bona Film Group Limited; Alibaba Pictures; Huaxia Film Distribution; Wanda Group
- Release date: 20 September 2019 (China)
- Running time: 140 minutes
- Country: China
- Language: Mandarin

Mao Zedong 1949 (Chinese: 决胜时刻) is a 2019 Chinese historical film directed by Huang Jianxin and Ning Haiqiang. The film stars Tang Guoqiang as Mao Zedong, alongside Liu Jing, Huang Jingyu and Wang Likun. The film picks up the history of the leaders of the Central Committee of the Chinese Communist Party, as they prepare to establish the People's Republic at a villa in Beijing's Fragrant Hills in 1949. The film was released in China on September 20, 2019.

== Cast ==
- Tang Guoqiang as Mao Zedong
- Liu Jing as Zhou Enlai
- Huang Jingyu as Chen Youfu
- Wang Likun as Meng Yu
- Qin Lan as Song Qingling
- Du Jiang as Regimental commander
- Ma Tianyu as War correspondent
- Lin Yongjian as Nie Rongzhen
- Zhang Hanyu as Mao Renfeng
- Ma Xiaowei as Chiang Kaishek
- Pu Cunxin as Li Zongren
- Liu Zhibing as Zhang Zhizhong
- Gao Shuguang as Bai Chongxi
- Wang Wufu as Zhu De
- Liu Sha as Liu Shaoqi
- Wang Jian as Ren Bishi
- Zhang Zijian as Li Kenong
- Lü Xing as Chiang Chingkuo
- Audrey Duo as Li Ne
- Zhou Tao as Song Meiling
- Nie Yuan as Luo Ruiqing
- Wu Haochen as Mao Anying
- Wu Gang as Zhou Zhirou
- Hu Wenge as Mei Lanfang
- Zhao Yi as Lin Biao
- Zhang Jianya as Li Zheng
- Ma Lun as Zhang Shizhao
- Li Shilong as Shao Lizi
- Cheng Zhiping as Cheng Siyuan
- Huang Wei as Deng Yingchao
- Zhao Ningyu as Ye Fei
- Gao Ge as Li Yinqiao
- Shi Xin as Deng Xiaoping
- Ye Jin as Ye Jianying
- Gao Zheng as Tian Jiaying
- Yuan Zhongxian as Huang Shaohong
- Cheng Guodong as Liu Fei

== Production ==
Huang Jianxin (The Founding of a Republic and The Founding of a Party) was hired as director.

The film was shot on a tight schedule of 67 days.

== Release ==
Mao Zedong 1949 was slated for release on September 12, 2019, in China but was postponed to September 20, 2019. The film premiered at the Shanghai International Film Festival on June 19, 2019, and opened in China on September 20, 2019.

== Reception ==
Douban, a major Chinese media rating site, gave the drama 6.9 out of 10.

== Box office ==
The film grossed in over 4 million yuan (565,531 U.S. dollars) at the Chinese box office on its opening weekend, according to statistics released by Maoyan, a Chinese film database and ticketing platform.
