= The Volunteers: To the War =

2023 Chinese war film directed by Chen Kaige

- Theatrical release poster
- Traditional Chinese: 志願軍：雄兵出擊
- Simplified Chinese: 志愿军：雄兵出击
- Hanyu Pinyin: Zhìyuànjūn: Xióngbīng Chūjī
- Directed by: Chen Kaige
- Screenplay by: Zhang Ke
- Based on: War and Sacrifice by Lan Xiaolong
- Produced by: Fu Ruoqing; Zhang Dayong
- Starring: Tang Guoqiang; Wan Yanhui; Liu Jing; Xin Baiqing; Zhang Songwen; Huang Xiaoming; Zhang Ziyi
- Cinematography: Zhao Fei; Li Qiang; Hu Tao
- Edited by: Li Dianshi
- Music by: Zhiyi Wang; Yu Xiaomu
- Production companies: China Film Group Corporation; CFC Pictures Limited; August First Film Studio; Beijing Rongyou Film & TV Culture Media; Emperor Motion Pictures
- Release date: 28 September 2023
- Running time: 140 minutes
- Country: China
- Language: Mandarin
- Box office: $121.4 million

The Volunteers: To the War (Chinese: 志愿军：雄兵出击) is a 2023 Chinese war film directed by Chen Kaige. It is a tribute to commemorate the "70th Anniversary of the War to Resist US Aggression and Aid Korea" as which it was perceived by that time in China. The film is adapted from Lan Xiaolong's novel War and Sacrifice. Set during the Korean War, the film is intended to be the first installment of a planned trilogy from Chen depicting China's involvement in the war.

The film was released on 28 September 2023. The planned trilogy was completed with sequels released in September of 2024 and 2025.

== Plot ==
In the early days of the founding of the People's Republic of China in 1949, the new China faced a situation of "internal and external troubles". Since the outbreak of the Korean War, the US military has repeatedly provoked on the Sino-North Korean border, and civilians have been bombed. In order to safeguard the hard-won peace and long-term stability for generations, in October 1950, Chairman Mao decided to send the People's Volunteer Army led by Comrade Peng Dehuai to fight in Korea, and the "War to Resist US Aggression and Aid Korea" kicked off. Their senior leaders conducted a series of careful discussions and deductions, and sent Premier Zhou to Moscow to request support. This is a "national war". On the Korean battlefield, even though there was a huge gap in armament strength, the army exchanged heroic sacrifices for successive victories; on the diplomatic stage, the delegation of the People's Republic of China appeared at the United Nations for the first time, and China's new voice won international respect. New China, not giving up an inch of land to promote national prestige; new youth, high-spirited to protect their country

== Cast ==
- Tang Guoqiang as Mao Zedong
- Wan Yanhui as Peng Dehuai
- Liu Jing as Zhou Enlai
- Xin Baiqing as Li Moyin
- Zhang Songwen as Wu Xiuquan
- Huang Xiaoming as Jiang Chao
- Zhang Ziyi as Tang Sheng
- Zhu Yawen as Wu Benzheng
- Zhang Zifeng as Li Xiao
- Wei Daxun as Mao Anying
- Xiao Yang as Zhao Annan
- Wang Xiao as Liang Xingchu
- Arthur Chen as Sun Xing
- Vision Wei as Dai Ruyi
- Yin Fang as Yang Shaocheng
- Zhang Youhao as Yang Sandi
- Hai Qing as Lin Qiaozhi
- Zhu Yilong as Li Xiang
- Du Chun as Ye Zilong
- Jia Bing as Li Tao
- Li Naiwen as Han Xianchu
- Lang Yueting as Gong Pusheng
- Eric Wang as Qiao Guanhua
- Lin Yongjian as Nie Rongzhen
- Wang Kaisheng as Deng Hua
- Wang Wufu as Zhu De
- Wu Dajing as Yang Gensi

== Production ==
Production on the film began in July 2022, and finished thirteen months later in August 2023.

== Marketing ==
A trailer for the film was released on 21 April 2023.

== Release ==
The Volunteers was released in China on 28 September 2023, timed to coincide with the country's National Day on October 1.

=== Box office ===
The film earned $34.7 million in its first four days of release, behind Under the Light and The Ex-Files 4: Marriage Plan. The film fell below expectations at the box office.

== Sequels ==
The second installment titled The Volunteers: The Battle of Life and Death (Chinese: 志愿军：存亡之战) was released on 30 September 2024. The trilogy was completed with the release of The Volunteers: Peace at Last in September 2025.

== See also ==
- The Battle at Lake Changjin (2021) and The Battle at Lake Changjin II (2022), two Chinese films set during the Korean War and co-directed by Chen Kaige
