= The First President =

- Film poster
- Traditional Chinese: 第一大总统
- Simplified Chinese: 第一大總統
- Hanyu Pinyin: Dìyī Dàzǒngtǒng
- Directed by: Wang Caitao
- Written by: Wang Chaozhu
- Produced by: Han Sanping
- Starring: Qiu Xinzhi; Nie Mei; Liu Jing; Han Geng; Tian Liang; Johnny Zhang; Xiong Naijin; He Jie
- Cinematography: Shao Dan
- Music by: Su Cong
- Distributed by: China Film Association; China Film Co., Ltd. Sanheng Yishu Screen Media ( Beijing ) Co., Ltd.
- Release date: 30 September 2011
- Running time: 114 minutes
- Country: China
- Language: Mandarin

The First President (Chinese: 第一大总统) is a 2011 Chinese biographical film directed by Wang Caitao, produced by Han Sanping, and starring Qiu Xinzhi, Nie Mei, Liu Jing, Han Geng, Tian Liang, Johnny Zhang, Xiong Naijin and He Jie. The film is about the life of Sun Yat-sen, founding father of Kuomintang and president of the Republic of China.

== Plot ==
In 1912, Sun Yat-sen was elected provisional president of the Republic of China. Yuan Shikai, a warlord leaded up to the abdication of the last Qing Emperor Puyi, and became president of the Republic of China. At this time, Sun Yat-sen went to Japan. And Song Jiaoren formed the Parliament and pushed the republican system into practice, finally, Song Jiaoren was assassinated. After Sun Yat-sen received the news, he also returned to China and organized the Second Revolution...

== Cast ==
=== Main ===
- Qiu Xinzhi as Sun Yat-sen, provisional president of the Republic of China.
- Nie Mei as Song Qingling, wife of Sun Yat-sen.

=== Supporting ===
- Liu Jing as Zhou Enlai
- Han Geng as Hu Hanmin, founding member of Kuomintang.
- Johnny Zhang as Chiang Kai-shek
- Xiong Naijin as Soong Ai-ling
- Liu Xiaofeng as Wang Jingwei
- Tiger Hu as Lin Zhimian, democratic revolutionist.
- Li Sheng as Empress Dowager Longyu
- Duan Junhao as Zhu Zhuowen, democratic revolutionist.
- Zhang Qiuge as Yuan Shikai
- Tian Liang as Song Jiaoren
- Yao Jude as Huang Xing
- Zhu Hu as Dai Jitao
- Ju Hao as Zhao Bingjun
- Ling Xiaosu as Li Liejun
- Zhou Yiwei as Chen Jiongming
- He Minghan as Ma Xiang, captain of the guards of Sun Yat-sen.
- Liu Yuqi as Yin Weijun
- Jiang Ping as Li Dazhao
- Cao Bingkun as Yuan Keding, son of Yuan Shikai.
- Xu Zhengting as Song Yaoru
- Wang Ji as Ni Guizhen
- Yu Na as Xu Zonghan
- Wang Yan as He Xiangning
- Tan Yaowen as Duan Qirui
- Bao Jianfeng as Doctor
- Ju Wenpei as Shi Qing, associate editor of Ta Kung Pao.
- Qin Hao as Zhang Ji
- Collin Chou as Chen Qimei
- Zhang Songwen as Ye Ju
- Zhang Yeshi as Yu Youren
- Wang Xiaohu as Tan Renfeng
- Hang Qi as Sun Fo

== Release ==
The film was released on September 30, 2011 in China.
