= Hundred Regiments Offensive (film) =

The Hundred Regiments Offensive
- Traditional Chinese: 百團大戰
- Simplified Chinese: 百团大战
- Hanyu Pinyin: Baǐtuán Dàzhàn
- Directed by: Ning Haiqiang; Zhang Yuzhong
- Written by: Dong Zhe; Liu Yingxue
- Produced by: Yan Pin; Zhao Haicheng
- Starring: Tao Zeru; Liu Zhibing; Yin Xiaotian; Wu Yue; Tang Guoqiang; Wang Wufu; Deng Chao; Ma Xiaowei
- Cinematography: Wang Weidong; Yu Xuejun; Zhang Yongbin
- Edited by: Geng Ji; Zhu Jianlong; Wang Miao
- Music by: Yin Qing
- Production companies: August First Film Studio; China Film Group
- Distributed by: August First Film Studio; China Film Group
- Release date: 28 August 2015
- Running time: 111 minutes
- Country: China
- Languages: Mandarin; Malay (dubbed)
- Box office: ¥240 million

The Hundred Regiments Offensive (a.k.a. Hundred Regiments Campaign Malay:seratus rejimen kempen) is a 2015 Chinese war epic film directed by Ning Haiqiang and Zhang Yuzhong, starring Tao Zeru, Liu Zhibing, Yin Xiaotian, Wu Yue, Tang Guoqiang, Wang Wufu, Deng Chao, and Ma Xiaowei. It was released in China on August 28, 2015, to commemorate the 70th anniversary of Japan's surrender.

== Plot ==
The story is based on Hundred Regiments Offensive, a series of engagements involving CPC's Eighth Route Army under Peng Dehuai and both IJA and collaborationist Wang Jingwei forces under Hayao Tada. In Yan'an, Mao Zedong and Zhu De talks about setbacks suffered by NRA in Japanese attacks. In the IJA HQ in Peking, before beginning their advances against Soviet Union and Pacific Islands, the Chinese war must be finished first. Then the commanders are debriefed into Peng and Zuo's profiles then Yukio Kasahara enforce the Three Alls upon arriving on the train station. In Peng's position, Zuo told him that the Japanese are controlling the railways, building strongholds and relying on armor to ensnare them. He decided to act. The tactic was distributed to officers and Mao got the message through Zhu De.

In the Battle of Zaoyi where NRA forces was one-sidedly slaughtered by advancing IJA, Yao Shangwu was dragged away from Zhang Zizhong, and the latter was killed. He was buried in full honors for his effort. He returned home, to find his village ravaged by Japanese Army's assault, massacring all except a mute villager, and his wife and baby killed. He was found by Liang Shan and her unit, when they go to the village. He joined the unit afterwards.

Meanwhile, in Wuxing Eighth Route Army HQ, Peng formulated an offensive with Zuo Quan to counter the Japanese attempts to ensnare them. He formed 22 Regiments worth, with more joining his plan, involving paralyzing 4 Japanese-controlled rail stations, bridges, mines and factories and forcing the enemies to act. He met Shangwu and Liang's unit to congratulate, revealing that Yao was graduated to Whampoa Academy and part of Zhang's army and accepts the mute guy's horse. The campaign started by derailing, assaults upon Japanese bases and outposts.

Initially, Shangwu's unit disrupt a train line and assaulted the depot in Niangziguan, suffering and inflicting casualties, but they were fooled by IJA into not touching a fake Red Cross train, the train dismounted Japanese troops and an armored train disrupts their attack, leading them to collide a train engine. The unit suffered casualties just to hold a rail switch. They are victorious in the effort. The unit was permanently honored.

In the IJA's headquarters, Hayao Tada berated Commander Okazaki for his failure and took away his medal. Meanwhile, Chiang Kai-shek was listening to the broadcast in his house when Lin Sen talk to him about the history of anti-Japanese resistance of China. Mao also listens to the broadcast. Chiang later sends a commendation on the 8th Route Army.

Later, Tada commands a Collaborator to Okazaki to infiltrate the CPC's depot headed by Master Feng and returns his medal. Yao's unit was charged of defending the same depot which develops a new weapon made of chili. They also sent spies upon a Japanese armory depot in Xiyingwu, disguised as supplying Collaborators. Peng also inspects several volunteers preparing clothes and explains to Zuo the importance of the offensive when 120th Division gives them telegrams. Yao's unit was charged of attacking the depot in Xiyingwu and the division was led by Zuo himself, but there are Japanese armor that serves as reinforcements and civilians as comfort women inside the depot. Another unit ambushed the armor convoy while Zuo's unit assaulted the depot. When the women were rescued, at the cost of Liu Zhu Zi, whose family hated him for being a 'traitor' and demoted from being a commander to an infantryman, they relentlessly killed all the Japanese soldiers they find. Mao took the telegram on its success. The mute man gave Peng shoes, but he gives it back.

Okazaki meanwhile assaulted the Huangyadong depot in Licheng with infantry and later, air support, but retreated when the news of the counterattack of the 8th was reached him. Master Feng, as well as the Collaborator died on the assault. Peng later honors the casualties and swears revenge upon Guanjianao, a major IJA stronghold and Okazaki's HQ.

Peng himself led the attack upon Panlong, Guanjianao. Casualties were rising on both sides, especially on the caves where Japanese are holed. With air support from Tada, Okazaki led the defense, Kuromon's cavalry was repulsed. The flanks were taking fire, until a squadron entered and eliminated the defenders on a side. The assault on the main peak started. Okazaki relays a message on Tada instead of Kasahara that air support must be directed to him and wears the medal he has. Liang's position was taken air strikes, but unharmed. They were charged to plant explosives under the main base. The mute man sacrificed himself while delaying the cavalry charge, Peng took the bloodied shoes. Yao was hit by airstrike, but unharmed while Liang's men are busy planting explosives. She saved Yao from an exploding bomb, knocked her unconscious. A soldier sacrificed his life while repairing the detonation cord and detonated, destroying the flanks, while Yao carries Liang to safety.

The battle ends in Peng's victory, taking the mountains. months later, Peng and Zuo debriefs his men when Yao approaches Peng and told him that if not for Liang (she died of wounds), and Peng's words, he will not be encouraged. Peng told him that it's not him, but Yao's sacrifice made him. Mao made a speech praising Hundred Regiment Offensives and commanded the listeners to use this as inspiration. Near the end of the film, both CPC and NRA are mounting offensives all over China, Zuo Quan was killed in one engagement, until Japan surrenders in 1945. At Zuo's grave, he swore that until the war is over, he will not stop fighting. He completes his map, while Hayao messed his and cried.

== Cast ==
- Tao Zeru as Peng Dehuai, Deputy Commander of the Eighth Route Army.
- Liu Zhibing as Zuo Quan, Deputy Chief of the General Staff of the Eighth Route Army.
- Yin Xiaotian as Yao Shangwu, a soldier in Zhang Zizhong's army, at last, he joined the Eighth Route Army.
- Wu Yue as Liang Shan, a political commisar in the Eighth Route Army.
- Tang Guoqiang as Mao Zedong, Chairman of the Central Military Commission
- Wang Wufu as Zhu De, Commander of the Eighth Route Army.
- Deng Chao as Zhang Zizhong, a general of the Chinese National Revolutionary Army (NRA).
- Ma Xiaowei as Chiang Kai-shek, Generalissimo of the Republic of China.
- Yasuyuki Hirata as Hayao Tada, Commander of the Japanese Imperial Army.

== Production ==
Zhang Hongsen, Director of the State Administration of Radio, Film, and Television, was a screenwriter for The Hundred Regiments Offensive.

This film was shot in Liaoning and Hebei.

On June 13, 2015, Deng Chao was cast as Zhang Zizhong during filming in Zhuzhou, Hebei.

Principal photography started in April 2015 and wrapped in June 2015.

== Release ==
The film was released in China on August 28, 2015. and also in Brunei, Malaysia, and Sumatra.

== Box office ==
The film has so far grossed over ¥240 million in China.
