= Kaiguo dadian =

Kāiguó Dàdiǎn is Mandarin for "nation founding ceremony" and may refer to:

- The founding ceremony of the People's Republic of China held in 1949, see Proclamation of the People's Republic of China
- The Birth of New China, a 1989 film
- "The Founding Ceremony of the Nation", an oil painting showing Chairman Mao founding the People's Republic of China
