= Lu Qi (actor) =

Chinese actor

- 卢奇
- Born: 21 August 1953 (age 72); Ganluo County, Liangshan Yi Autonomous Prefecture, Sichuan, China
- Occupation: Actor
- Years active: 1979 - present
- Notable work: Baise Uprising; Deng Xiaoping
- Political party: Chinese Communist Party
- Awards: 10th Golden Rooster Award for Best Actor; 1990 Baise Uprising; 9th Huabiao Award for Best Actor; 2002 Deng Xiaoping; 26th Hundred Flowers Award for Best Actor; 2003 Deng Xiaoping; Golden Phoenix Award; 2003

Lu Qi (simplified Chinese: 卢奇; traditional Chinese: 盧奇; pinyin: Lú Qí; born 21 August 1953) is a Chinese actor.

He has won the Hundred Flowers Award for Best Actor, Huabiao Award for Best Actor, and received Golden Rooster Award for Best Actor and Golden Phoenix Award.

== Biography ==
Lu was born in Ganluo County, Liangshan Yi Autonomous Prefecture, Sichuan on August 21, 1953. He joined the People's Liberation Army during his early years, then he became an actor in Sichuan People's Art Theatre, later, he was transferred to August First Film Studio.

In 2012, Lu recruited a student Miu Xiaoquan (缪孝全).

== Filmography ==
=== Television ===
Year	Chinese title	English title	Role	Cast	Director	Ref
1990	《中国神火》	The China Weapon	Deng Xiaoping	Da Shichang, Zhang Xuehan	Su Zhou	
1991	《百团大战》	Hundred Regiments Offensive	Deng Xiaoping	Ding Xiaoyi, Zhang Xinya, Sun Feihu, Fu Xuecheng	Sun Wei	
1993	《大进攻序曲》	Spring Offensive	Deng Xiaoping	Fu Xuecheng, Ma Yongsheng, Liu Xitian	Zhang Yi	
1993	《解放云南》	Yunnan Liberation	Deng Xiaoping	Qin Zhao, Fu Xuecheng, Sun Feihu	Zhang Jinbiao	
1993	《刘邓在平汉前线》	Liu Bocheng and Deng Xiaoping in the War	Deng Xiaoping	Fu Xuecheng, Sun Feihu, Chen Jiadou	Guo Fazeng	
1997	《西藏风云》	The Story of Tibet	Deng Xiaoping	Liu Yongsheng, Gu Yue, Sun Weimin, Guo Fazeng	Zhai Junjie	
1998	《中国命运的决战》	Chinese Civil War	Deng Xiaoping	Gu Yue, Wang Wufu, Kong Xiangyu, Guo Fazeng	Wang Jin	
1999	《邓小平在1950》	Deng Xiaoping in 1950	Deng Xiaoping	Fu Xuecheng	Tang Peilin	
2000	《日出东方》	The Sun Comes Up in the East	Deng Xiaoping	Wang Ying, Kong Xiangyu, Huang Wei, Sun Weimin	Wang Jin	
2001	《向前，向前！》	Forward, Forward!	Deng Xiaoping	Shi Jingming, Du Yulou, Gu Yue	Yang Jun	
2004	《格达活佛》	Geda Living Buddha	Deng Xiaoping	Wang Wufu	Yang Tao	
2004	《南阳大战》	The Nanyang War	Deng Xiaoping	Gu Yue, Sun Feihu, Fu Xuecheng	Li Yucai	
2005	《八路军》	Eighth Route Army	Deng Xiaoping	Tang Guoqiang, Wang Wufu, Liu Jing, Yao Jude	Song Yemin	
2006	《上将许世友》	General Xu Shiyou	Deng Xiaoping	Zhang Qiuge, Fan Ming, Liu Jing	An Lan	
2006	《爱在战火纷飞时》	The Love in the War	Zhang Dewei	Wen Zhaolun, Song Chunli, Fu Yao	Dong Yachun	
2009	《解放》	Liberation	Deng Xiaoping	Tang Guoqiang, Wang Wufu, Liu Jing, Guo Lianwen	Tang Guoqiang	
2009	《叶挺将军》	General Ye Ting	Deng Xiaoping	Gao Fa, Liu Jing, Gai Mei	Wang Jixing	
2010	《解放大西南》	Southwest China Liberation	Deng Xiaoping	Tang Guoqiang, Sun Weimin, Wang Wufu, Zong Liqun		
2011	《东方》	East	Deng Xiaoping	Tang Guoqiang, Sun Weimin, Wang Wufu, Zong Liqun	Lu Qi	
2011	《王稼祥》	Wang Jiaxiang	Deng Xiaoping	Wang Ying, Wang Luoyong, Liu Jing	Wang Yiyan	
2011	《邓小平在重庆》	Deng Xiaoping in Chongqing	Deng Xiaoping	Fu Xuecheng, Dong Fan	Yan Guangzong	
2011	《开天辟地》	The Creation of PRC	Sun Zhongshan	Huang Haibing, Chen Jianbin, Jiang Qinqin	Hu Mei	
2012	《五星红旗迎风飘扬》	The Five-Starred Red Flag	Deng Xiaoping	Tang Guoqiang, Sun Weimin, Ma Xiaowei, Wang Xinjun	Liu Guang	
2012	《苏东坡》	Su Dongpo	Emperor Shenzong of Song	Lu Yi, Ruby Lin	Wang Wenjie	
2012	《贺龙元帅》	Marshal He Long	Deng Xiaoping	Wu Qijiang, Gan Yu	Song Yeming	
2012	《聂荣臻》	Nie Rongzhen	Deng Xiaoping	Lin Yongjian, Qi Huan, Wang Wufu, Liu Jing		

=== Film ===
Year	Chinese title	English title	Role	Cast	Director	Ref
1978	《山城雪》	Snow Covered the City	Deng Xiaoping	Wu Gang, Xiang Kun, Fang Xia, Tu Zhongru	Qian Qianli	
1986	《孙中山与宋庆龄》	Sun zhongshan and Song Qingling	Sun Zhongshan			
1988	《百色起义》	Baise Uprising	Deng Xiaoping	Li Liangtao, Guo Shaowei	Chen Jialin	
1989	《开国大典》	Founding Ceremony of the PRC	Deng Xiaoping	Gu Yue, Sun Feihu, Fu Xuecheng, Guo Fazeng	Li Qiankuan, Xiao Guiyun	
1991	《大决战：淮海战役》	The Huaihai Campaign	Deng Xiaoping	Gu Yue, Fu Xuecheng, Liu Xitian	Li Jun, Cai Jiwei	
1991	《周恩来》	Zhou Enlai	Deng Xiaoping	Wang Tiecheng, Zheng Xiaojuan, Zhang Yun	Ding Yinnan	
1993	《重庆谈判》	Chongqing Negotiations	Deng Xiaoping	Gu Yue, Guo Fazeng, Hu Huizhong	Li Qiankuan	
1996	《大转折》	The Great Transformation	Deng Xiaoping	Gu Yue, Fu Xuecheng, Sun Weimin, Guo Lianwen	Wei Lian	
1998	《大进军席卷大西南》	The War of Southwest China	Deng Xiaoping	Fu Xuecheng, Gu Yue, Zhao Hengduo	Song Yeming	
1999	《大进军大战宁沪杭》	The War of Ningbo, Shanghai and Hangzhou	Deng Xiaoping	Gu Yue, Sun Feihu, Liu Xitian, Xie Weicai	Wei Lian, Shi Wei	
2001	《詹天佑》	Zhan Tianyou	Sun Zhongshan	Feng Chunchao, Kong Xiangyu, Gao Ming	Sun Daolin	
2002	《黄埔军人》	Soldiers of Huangpu	Sun Zhongshan	Guo Weihua, He Zhengjun, Liu Zhibing	Ning Haiqiang	
2003	《邓小平》	Deng Xiaoping	Deng Xiaoping		Ding Yinnan	
2005	《我的法兰西岁月》	My France Years	Deng Xiaoping	Zhou Lang, Wang Shuo, Sha Yi	Zhai Junjie	
2005	《太行山上》	On the Mountain of Tai Hang	Deng Xiaoping	Wang Wufu, Zong Liqun, Zhang Lin	Wei Lian	
2009	《我和红七军》	The 7th Red Army and Me	Deng Xiaoping	Bai Guowei, Wu Beibei, Zhang Duo	Wang Xiaomin	
2010	《高原密码》			Guo Xiaodong, Annie Yi, Aisin-Gioro Qixing, Yao Di		
2011	《门球健将》		Secretary	Zhang Yongda, Wu Mian, Duan Qingqing	Li Yong	
2012	《决战前夜》	Night Before Battle	Deng Xiaoping	Liu Jing, Guo Lianwen, Wang Wufu	Zhang Chi	
2015	《相伴库里申科》	A Promise to the Kurichenko's				

== Awards ==
Year	Work	Award	N/W	Ref
1990	Baise Uprising	10th Golden Rooster Award for Best Actor	Won	
2002	Deng Xiaoping	9th Huabiao Award for Best Actor	Won	
2003	Deng Xiaoping	26th Hundred Flowers Award for Best Actor	Won	
2003		Golden Phoenix Award	Won	
