= Zhang Junning =

Zhang Junning may refer to:

- Janine Chang (張鈞甯; born 1982), Taiwanese actress
- Johnny Zhang (张峻宁; born 1985), Chinese actor
