= Mao Zedong (TV series) =

Chinese television series

- Also known as
- Traditional Chinese: 毛澤東
- Simplified Chinese: 毛泽东
- Genre: Epic biographical, historical
- Based on: Mao Zedong
- Written by: Huang Hui; Ye Jian; Quan Ying; Yang Hong
- Directed by: Gao Xixi
- Starring: Tang Guoqiang; Liu Jing; Guo Lianwen; Wang Wufu; Li Bowen
- Ending theme: PLA Occupied Nanjing (中国人民解放军占领南京)
- Country of origin: China
- Original languages: Mandarin; English; Russian; Japanese; Korean
- No. of seasons: 2
- No. of episodes: 100

Production
- Executive producers: Zhang Huali; Zhou Yaping; Luo Hao
- Production locations: Hunan, Shaanxi, Chongqing, Beijing, Shanghai
- Cinematography: Niu Mingshan; Zhong Hua; Lu Jian; Sun Xiaoliang; Yang Wei
- Production companies: China Television Production Center; Hunan Radio and TV Station; Hunan Heguang Media; Zhejiang Meinong Film

Original release
- Release: December 25, 2013 – January 27, 2014

Mao Zedong (simplified Chinese: 毛泽东; traditional Chinese: 毛澤東; pinyin: Máo Zédōng) is a 2013 Chinese epic biographical television series which dramatises the life of Mao Zedong, former chairman of the Chinese Communist Party and the main founder of the People's Republic of China. It was directed by Gao Xixi, and starred Tang Guoqiang, Liu Jing, Li Bowen, Guo Lianwen, and Wang Wufu. The television series was released in 2013 to mark the 120th anniversary of the birth of Mao Zedong.

== Cast ==
=== Mao and other Communist Party leaders ===
- Hou Jingjian as Younger Mao Zedong.
- Tang Guoqiang as Mao Zedong.
- Liu Congdan as Yang Kaihui, Mao's first wife.
- Liu Jing as Zhou Enlai.
- Xia Dejun as Younger Zhou Enlai.
- Wang Wufu as Zhu De.
- Ren Shan as Younger Zhu De.
- Guo Lianwen as Liu Shaoqi.
- Zong Liqun as Peng Dehuai.
- Sun Hongtao as Zhang Wentian.
- Wang Yanan as Ye Ting.
- Wang Biqi as He Zizhen, Mao's second wife.
- Shao Feng as Wang Jiaxiang.
- Fan Ying as Mao Anying, Mao's elder son.
- Sun Jia as Madame Mao, Mao's third wife.
- You Liping as Lin Biao.
- Wang Jian as Ren Bishi.
- Zhao Liqiang as Xi Zhongxun.
- Xu Maomao as Nie Rongzhen.
- Gu Wei as Chen Yi.
- Xie Gang as Chen Yun.

=== Kuomintang leaders ===
- Ma Xiaowei as Chiang Kai-shek.
- Zhao Kai as Chiang Ching-kuo.
- Yu Bin as Zhang Xueliang.
- Liu Bo as H. H. Kung.
- Ke Lan as Soong Ai-ling.
- Zhang Junhan as Chen Lifu.
- Yu Mingjia as Madame Chiang Kai-shek.
- Tse Kwan-ho as Sun Yat-sen.
- Liu Yijun as Wang Jingwei.

=== Others ===
- Zhang Chaowen as Xiao Zisheng.
- Wang Renjun as Guangxu Emperor.
- Zhao Hanjun as Huang Yanpei.
- Miura Kenichi as Hideki Tojo.
- Li Bowen
- Wang Gongliang

== Production ==
Shooting began in December 2012 and took place in various locations including Hunan, Shaanxi, Chongqing, Beijing, and Shanghai.

== Award ==
Year	Award	Category	Recipient(s) and nominee(s)	Ref.
2014	China TV Golden Eagle Award	Golden Eagle Award for Best Television Series	Nominated	
