= 八月一日 =

八月一日, meaning "August 1", may refer to:

- Japanese surname
  - Shizuka Hazumi (八月一日 静), fictional character in Japanese manga Arpeggio of Blue Steel
- The First of August, 2007 Chinese film directed by Song Yeming

== See also ==
- The dictionary definition of 八 at Wiktionary
- The dictionary definition of 月 at Wiktionary
- The dictionary definition of 一 at Wiktionary
- The dictionary definition of 日 at Wiktionary
