= Liu Jing (actor) =

Chinese actor

- 刘劲
- Born: December 7, 1963 (age 62); Ngawa, Sichuan, China
- Education: People's Liberation Army Arts College
- Occupation: Actor
- Years active: 1988–present
- Spouse: Hu Yanping
- Children: 1
- Awards: Full list

Chinese name
- Traditional Chinese: 劉勁
- Simplified Chinese: 刘劲
Transcriptions
Standard Mandarin
- Hanyu Pinyin: Liú Jìng

Liu Jing (a.k.a. Liu Jin, Chinese: 刘劲; born 7 December 1963) is a Chinese actor.

He has won the 25th China Golden Eagle Award for Favorite Actor and 5th China Golden Eagle Award for the Most Popular Actor.

== Biography ==
Liu was born in Ngawa Tibetan and Qiang Autonomous Prefecture, Sichuan on December 7, 1963.

After graduating from People's Liberation Army Arts College, he became an actor.

== Works ==
=== Television ===
Year	Chinese Title	Title	Role	Cast	Director	Ref.
1996	《遵义会议》	Zunyi Conference	Zhou Enlai			
1998	《西游记》	Journey to the West	demon		Yang Jie	
1998	《周恩来在上海》	Zhou Enlai in Shanghai	Zhou Enlai			
1998	《开国领袖毛泽东》	Chairman Mao	Zhou Enlai	Tang Guoqiang, Guo Lianwen, Sun Feihu, Wang Wufu	Yang Guangyuan, Wang Jixing	
1998	《李克农》	Li Kenong	Zhou Enlai			
2001	《红岸》		Zhou Enlai			
2001	《长征》	The Long March	Zhou Enlai	Tang Guoqiang, Guo Lianwen, Wang Wufu, Chen Daoming, Yao Jude	Jin Tao, Tang Guoqiang	
2002	《欲望的代价》	The Price of Desire	Zhou Yuxuan			
2003	《张学良》	Zhang Xueliang	Zhang Xueliang	Yao Jude		
2003	《延安颂》	The Song of Yan'an	Zhou Enlai	Tang Guoqiang, Guo Lianwen, Wang Wufu, Yao Jude	Song Yeming	
2005	《磨坊女人》		a businessman			
2005	《八路军》	Eighth Route Army	Zhou Enlai	Tang Guoqiang, Guo Lianwen, Wang Wufu, Yao Jude	Song Yeming	
2005	《家有儿女第二季》	Home With Kids	President of Theatre			
2005	《陈赓大将》	General Chen Geng	Zhou Enlai			
2006	《船政风云》		Prince Gong	Sun Feihu, Bao Guo'an, Wang Wei	Song Yeming	
2006	《雄关漫道》		Zhou Enlai	Song Jialun, Zhang Rihui	Zhang Yuzhong	
2007	《浴血坚持》		Zhou Enlai			
2007	《叶挺将军》	General Ye Ting	Zhou Enlai	Wang Wufu		
2007	《英雄无名》		Zhou Enlai			
2007	《周恩来在重庆》	Zhou Enlai in Chongqing	Zhou Enlai	Wang Wufu		
2008	《解放》	Liberation	Zhou Enlai	Tang Guoqiang, Guo Lianwen, Wang Wufu	Tang Guoqiang, Dong Yachun	
2008	《延安锄奸》		Zhou Enlai			
2009	《金凤花开》		Zhou Enlai			
2009	《北平战与和》	War of Beiping	Zhou Enlai	Guo Lianwen, Chen Yiheng, Li Kejian	Zhang Qian	
2009	《共和国摇篮》	The Founding of the PRC	Zhou Enlai			
2009	《江南锄奸》		Li Shaobai			
2010	《十三格格新传》		Prince Gong			
2012	《毛泽东》	Mao Zedong	Zhou Enlai	Tang Guoqiang, Wang Wufu, Lu Qi, Yao Jude	Gao Xixi	

=== Film ===
Year	Chinese Title	Title	Role	Cast	Director	Ref.
1990	《天边有一簇圣火》					
1995	《宋家皇朝》	The Song Sisters	Zhang Xueliang		Zhang Wanting	
1996	《长征》	The Long March	Zhou Enlai			
2000	《相伴永远》	The Concomitant Whole Life	Zhou Enlai			
2004	《张思德》	Zhang Side	Zhou Enlai			
2004	《邓小平在1928年》	Deng Xiaoping in 1928	Zhou Enlai			
2007	《没有共产党就没有新中国》	There Would Be No PRC Without The Chinese Communist Party	Zhou Enlai		Shen Dong	
2007	《八月一日》	August 1st	Zhou Enlai		Hu Mei	
2009	《建国大业》	The Founding of a Republic	Zhou Enlai		Han Sanping, Huang Jianxin	
2009	《鏊兵天府》		Zhou Enlai			
2010	《辛亥革命》	1911	Song Jiaoren		Zhang Li, Jackie Chan	
2019	《决胜时刻》	Mao Zedong 1949	Zhou Enlai			
2023	《志愿军：雄兵出击》	The Volunteers: To the War	Zhou Enlai			

== Awards ==
- 25th China Golden Eagle Award for Favorite Actor
- 5th China Golden Eagle Award for the Most Popular Actor
