= Li Zheng =

Li Zheng may refer to:

- Li Zheng (educator) (1895–1975), Chinese educator and politician
- Li Zheng (weightlifter) (born 1986), Chinese weightlifter
- Li Xinyu (footballer) (born 1996), Chinese footballer formerly known as Li Zheng
- Li Zheng (diver) (born 2000), Chinese diver
