= Charging Out Amazon =

- Film poster
- Traditional Chinese: 衝出亞馬遜
- Simplified Chinese: 冲出亚马逊
- Hanyu Pinyin: Chōngchū Yàmǎxùn
- Directed by: Song Yeming
- Written by: Zhao Junfang; Wang Gehong
- Produced by: Zhao Xuehua; Chen Quansheng; Liu Long
- Starring: Hou Yong; Mu Lixin; Tom Butler
- Cinematography: Dong Yachun
- Production companies: August First Film Studio; CCTV-6
- Release date: 1 July 2002 (China)
- Running time: 102 minutes
- Country: China
- Language: Mandarin
- Budget: ¥18 million

Charging Out Amazon is a 2002 Chinese action film directed by Song Yeming and written by Zhao Junfang and Wang Gehong. The film stars Hou Yong, Mu Lixin, and Tom Butler. It was produced by August First Film Studio and CCTV-6. Charging Out Amazon was released in China on July 1, 2002. It received mixed to positive reviews and was a box office success. The film won Best Ornamental Effect Award from Beijing College Student Film Festival, four awards from Huabiao Awards, and three awards from Golden Rooster Awards and was nominated for Best Recording.

== Cast ==
- Hou Yong as Wang Hui, Lieutenant of the special troop of People's Liberation Army.
- Mu Lixin as Hu Xiaolong, second Lieutenant of the special troop of People's Liberation Army.
- Tom Butler as Cody Ross, General.
- Croft Wiutam as Chief Instructor.
- Heath Cortn as Lina Ross, doctoress, Cody Ross's daughter.
- Dean Marshall as Johnson, Lieutenant of the Storm Troops.
- Andr Thompsom as Rossini, Lieutenant of the amphibious assault team.
- J. R. Bourne as Michael, Lieutenant of the storm troops.
- Ton Cutnbert as "Black lion", leader of the drug gang

== Production ==
This film was shot in Sanya, Hainan.

== Accolades ==
Date	Award	Category	Recipients	Result	Notes
26 May 2002	Beijing College Student Film Festival	Best Ornamental Effect	Charging Out Amazon	Won	
12 September 2002	Huabiao Awards	Outstanding Film	Song Yeming	Won	
12 September 2002	Huabiao Awards	Outstanding Film Technology	Charging Out Amazon	Won	
12 September 2002	Huabiao Awards	Outstanding Director	Song Yeming	Won	
12 September 2002	Huabiao Awards	Outstanding Actor	Hou Yong	Won	
22 October 2002	Golden Rooster Awards	Best Picture	Song Yeming	Won	
22 October 2002	Golden Rooster Awards	Best Cinematography	Dong Yachun	Won	
22 October 2002	Golden Rooster Awards	Best Art	Jin Rongzhe	Won	
22 October 2002	Golden Rooster Awards	Best Recording	Wang Yingang	Nominated	
