= Yao Jude =

Chinese actor (born 1957)

- 姚居德
- Born: 1957 (age 68–69); Gai County, Yingkou, Liaoning, China
- Education: Shenyang Conservatory of Music
- Occupation: Actor
- Years active: 1990–present
- Notable work: Long March; Chairman Mao
- Political party: Chinese Communist Party
- Awards: Plum Blossom Prize

Yao Jude (Chinese: 姚居德; pinyin: Yáo Jūdé; born 1957) is a Chinese actor. He is now a member of China Artist Association. He has won the Plum Blossom Prize.

== Biography ==
Yao was born in Gai County, Yingkou, Liaoning in 1957. After graduating from Shenyang Conservatory of Music he became an actor.

== Filmography ==
=== Television ===
Year	Chinese title	English title	Role	Cast	Director	Ref
1992	喋血四平	The War of Siping	Ming Yue			
1996	北京往北是北大荒		Head of a station		Li Longyue	
1998	彭德怀铁血湘鄂赣	Peng Dehuai in Hunan, Hubei and Jiangxi	Peng Dehuai	Huang Gang, Xiao Yang, Li Kejian	Song Yeming	
1999	开国领袖毛泽东	Chairman Mao	Tang Enbo	Tang Guoqiang, Liu Jing, Sun Feihu, Guo Lianwen	Yang Guangyuan, Wang Jixing	
2000	清风店战役	The War of Qingfengdian	Yang Dezhi			
2000	山野	Mountains and Plains	Hu Tiancheng			
2001	中原突围	War of Central Plains	Zhang Yuebang	Xu Ping, Guo Weihua, Liu Yongsheng	Shi Wei	
2001	长征	The Long March	Peng Dehuai	Tang Guoqiang, Guo Lianwen, Wang Wufu, Chen Daoming	Jin Tao, Tang Guoqiang	
2002	张学良	Zhang Xueliang	Brother Lee	Tang Guoqiang, Song Xiaoying, Liu Jing		
2003	延安颂	The Song of Yan'an	Peng Dehuai	Tang Guoqiang, Guo Lianwen, Wang Wufu	Song Yeming	
2003	女装甲团长		Zhao Sen	Fan Zhibo	Shi Xuehai	
2003	大鳄无形		Zhang Zhongliang	Yang Lixin, Gao Ming, Chen Baoguo	Luan Fengqin	
2005	八路军	Eighth Route Army	Peng Dehuai	Tang Guoqiang, Guo Lianwen, Wang Wufu	Song Yeming	
2005	兵变1938		Li Wancheng	Mei Ting, Li Junfeng	Zhang Yuzhong	
2006	武昌首义	The Wuchang Uprising	Sun Wu	Li Chengru, Xu Guangming, Wu Shanshan	Li Yunliang	
2007	井冈山	Jing Gangshan Mountains	Peng Dehuai	Wang Ying, Pan Yuchen, Song Jialun	Jin Tao	
2007	周恩来在重庆	Zhou Enlai in Chongqing	Tian Han	Liu Jing		
2008	保卫延安	Defend Yan'an	Peng Dehuai	Tang Guoqiang, Pan Yuchen	Wan Shenghua	
2008	解放	Liberation	Peng Dehuai	Tang Guoqiang, Liu Jing, Wang Wufu	Tang Guoqiang, Dong Yachun	
2010	毛岸英	Mao Anying	Peng Dehuai	Han Zhong, Wang Hui, Yu Xiaoguang	Liu Yiran	
2011	辛亥革命	Xinhai Revolution	Huang Xing	Ma Shaohua, Zhang Qiuge, Ma Xiaowei	Li Wei	
2011	大营救	The Rescue	Wen An	Gao Shuguang, Li Junfeng, Che Yongli	You Jiangxiong	
2012	《经侦在行动之黑金烈		Ding Haifeng, Chen Tianlu, Wang Yuejin		Xie Hong	
2012	大南遷	The Great Southern Migration	Uncle Geng	Zou Zhaolong, Yu Feihong, Kent Tong, Li Ruojia	Yan Qingxiu	

=== Film ===
Year	Chinese title	English title	Role	Cast	Director	Ref
1990	大决战：辽沈战役	Decisive Engagement: The Liaoxi-Shenyang Campaign	Su Jing	Gu Yue, Sun Haiying	Li Jun	
1998	大进军席卷大西南	The War of Southwest China	a regimental commander	Fu Xuecheng, Gu Yue, Zhao Hengduo	Song Yeming	
2001	北纬三十八度	38°N	Han Xianchu			
2007	永远是春天	Where Spring Stays Forever	Wang Leyi	Wen Yujuan, Zhang Zhaobei	Zeng Jianfeng	
2011	第一大总统	The First President	Huang Xing	Qiu Xinzhi, Liu Jing, He Jie	Wang Caitao	

== Awards ==
- Plum Blossom Prize
