= Lu Zhuguo =

Chinese screenwriter and writer (1928–2022)

- Born: 12 October 1928; Yiyang County, Henan, China
- Died: 1 December 2022 (aged 94)
- Occupations: Screenwriter, writer
- Years active: 1950–2022
- Awards: Golden Rooster Awards – Best Writing; 1998 Fight Back to Southwest; Lifetime Achievement Award; 2007

Chinese name
- Traditional Chinese: 陸柱國
- Simplified Chinese: 陆柱国
Transcriptions
Standard Mandarin
- Hanyu Pinyin: Lù Zhùguó

Lu Zhuguo (Chinese: 陆柱国; 12 October 1928 – 1 December 2022) was a Chinese screenwriter and writer.

== Career ==
In 1951, Lu became the chief editor of PLA Literature and Art. In 1958, he entered 1 August Studio. In 1977, Lu won Xia Yan Film Literary Prize. In 2005, China Film Literature Society honored him with Lifetime Achievement Award.

== Selected filmography ==
Year	English Title	Chinese title	Notes
1958	Battle on the Black Mountain	《黑山狙击战》	
1959	Sea Eagle	《海鹰》	
1959	Xiong Dao	《雄岛》	
1959	Youth In Flames of War	《战火中的青春》	
1964	Drainage Divide	《分水岭》	
1964	Detached Battalion	《独立大队》	
1964	Lei Feng	《雷锋》	
1974	Bright Red Star	《闪闪的红星》	
1976	Storm Over the South-China Sea	《南海风云》	
1983	Dao Shi Wu Qing Que You Qing	《道是无情胜有情》	
1997	The Great Military March Forward: Engulf the Southwest	《大进军席卷大西南》	Golden Rooster Award for Best Writing; Shanghai Film Critics Award for Best Writing
2005	On the Mountain of Tai Hang	《太行山上》	Huabiao Award for Outstanding Writing; Nominated - Golden Rooster Award for Best Writing
