= Deng Xiaoping (2003 film) =

- Directed by: Ding Yinnan
- Release date: February 19, 2003 (China)
- Country: China
- Language: Chinese

Deng Xiaoping is a 2003 Chinese film directed by Ding Yinnan and starring veteran actor Lu Qi as the aged Deng Xiaoping. The biopic was the first major film on the life of Deng Xiaoping, though it only covers the twenty years from his return to power.
