= Scary Road Is Fun =

Scary Road is Fun
- Film poster
- 陌路惊笑
- Directed by: Samm Chan
- Release date: April 17, 2015
- Running time: 88 minutes
- Country: China
- Language: Mandarin
- Box office: CN¥1.28 million (China)

Scary Road is Fun (Chinese: 陌路惊笑) is a 2015 Chinese comedy thriller film directed by Samm Chan. It was released on April 17, 2015.

== Cast ==
- Johnny Zhang
- Michael Tong
- He Haoyang
- Zhang Weixun
- Yao Wenxue
- Pan Yanfei
- Li Ang
- Yang Di
- Kingdom Yuen

== Reception ==
By April 27, the film had earned CN¥1.28 million at the Chinese box office.
