= On the Mountain of Tai Hang =

- Film poster
- Directed by: Chen Jian; Shen Dong; Wei Lian
- Screenplay by: Lu Zhuguo
- Story by: An Lan; Lin Daxin; Liu Xing
- Produced by: Chen Quansheng; Li Pingfen; Wu Wenjin; Xu Kaiming
- Starring: Wang Wufu; Li Shusheng; Xu Guangming
- Cinematography: Jiang Lijun; Wang Yang; Yang Yandi; Zhang Ying
- Production companies: August First Film Studio; Southern Film
- Release date: August 15, 2005 (China)
- Running time: 117 minutes
- Country: China
- Language: Mandarin

On the Mountain of Tai Hang (Chinese: 太行山上; pinyin: Tài Háng shān shàng) is a 2005 Chinese film about the newly formed Eighth Route Army, led by general commander Zhu De, marching east cross the Yellow River to form Mount Tai Hang military region during the Second Sino-Japanese War. It was produced by the People's Liberation Army-associated August First Film Studio and directed by Wei Lian, Shen Dong and Chen Jian. The film stars Wang Wufu (as Zhu De), Lu Qi (as Deng Xiaoping).

The film won the 25th Golden Rooster Award for Best Picture in 2005.

Actors from Taiwan and Hong Kong were invited to portray Kuomintang leaders.

== Cast ==
- Wang Wufu as Zhu De
- Zong Liqun as Peng Dehuai
- Li Shusheng as Zuo Quan
- Zhang Lin as Ren Bishi
- Lu Qi as Deng Xiaoping
- Li Youbin as Zhu Huaibing
- Tony Leung Ka-fai as He Bingyan
- Liu Dekai as Hao Mengling
- Kudō Shunsaku as Abe Norihide
- Wu Yue as Chen Xilian
- Anna as Agnes Smedley
