= The Deathday Party =

- Directed by: Xie Hang
- Production companies: Beijing Guanghui Liansheng Entertainment Co., Ltd; China Film Group Corporation; Golden Harvest Entertainment Co. Ltd; HG Entertainment; E Mei Film Group; Sichuan Eying Xinshengli Media Co., Ltd
- Distributed by: Golden Harvest
- Release date: September 19, 2014 (China)
- Running time: 86 minutes
- Country: China
- Language: Mandarin
- Box office: ¥4.72 million (China)

The Deathday Party (Chinese: 死亡派对) is a 2014 Chinese suspense thriller film directed by Xie Hang. It was released on September 19, 2014.

== Cast ==
- Anita Yuen
- Archie Kao
- Xiong Naijin
- Zhang Zimu

== Reception ==
By September 28, it had earned ¥4.72 million at the Chinese box office.
