= Nature Law =

- Directed by: Li Jian; Qiu Zhongwei
- Production companies: Beijing Benniao Gaofei Entertainment Co., Ltd; Yuji Xinghai Media; Beijing Baidu Nuomi Information Technology Co., Ltd; Beijing Jiumen Sicheng Entertainment Co., Ltd
- Release date: November 7, 2014
- Running time: 95 minutes
- Countries: China; Singapore
- Language: Mandarin
- Box office: ¥1.03 million (China)

Nature Law or Break (Chinese: 拆散专家) is a 2014 Chinese-Singaporean romantic comedy film directed by Li Jian and Qiu Zhongwei. It was released on November 7.

== Cast ==
- Eva Huang
- Jia Yiping
- Johnny Zhang
- Liu Tianzuo
- Lam Suet
- Xiao Jian
- Jiang Hongbo
- Liu Huan
- Yue Yueli
- Li Jing

== Reception ==
By November 7, the film had earned ¥1.03 million at the Chinese box office.
