= Wang Wufu =

Chinese actor (born 1948)

- 王伍福
- Born: 1948 (age 77–78); Republic of China
- Occupation: Actor
- Years active: 1990–present
- Notable work: Chairman Mao; Marshal Zhu De
- Political party: Chinese Communist Party
- Awards: 11th Golden Phoenix Award

Wang Wufu (Chinese: 王伍福; pinyin: Wāng Wǔfú; born 1948) is a Chinese actor. He won the 11th Golden Phoenix Award, and received the Golden Eagle Award for Best Actor in 2008.

== Filmography ==
=== Television ===
Year	Chinese title	English title	Role	Cast	Director	Ref.
1987	古城情缘		Zhu De	Gu Yue, Wang Zhiwen, Sun Feihu		
1995	苏北决战	The War of Suzhou	Zhu De	Sun Feihu, Gu Yue, Bao Haiming		
1997	西藏风云	The Story of Tibet	Zhu De	Liu Yongsheng, Lu Qi, Gu Yue, Sun Weimin	Zhai Junjie	
1998	少奇同志	Comrade Shaoqi	Zhu De	Li Kejian, Guo Lianwen, Zong Liqun, Sun Weimin	Sun Bo	
1998	中国命运的决战		Zhu De	Gu Yue, Kong Xiangyu, Guo Fazeng, Lu Qi	Wang Jin	
1999	开国领袖毛泽东	Chairman Mao	Zhu De	Tang Guoqiang, Liu Jing, Sun Feihu, Guo Lianwen	Yang Guangyuan, Wang Jixing	
1999	朱德元帅	Marshal Zhu De	Zhu De	Gu Yue, Yan Ni, Guo Fazeng	Zheng Kehong	
2001	长征	The Long March	Zhu De	Tang Guoqiang, Liu Jing, Guo Lianwen, Chen Daoming	Jin Tao, Tang Guoqiang	
2003	新四军	The New Fourth Army	Zhu De	Wu Jing'an, Feng Guoqing, Liu Zhibing		
2003	延安颂	The Song of Yan'an	Zhu De	Tang Guoqiang, Liu Jing, Guo Lianwen, Yao Jude	Song Yeming	
2003	肖劲光大将	General Xiao Jingguang	Zhu De	Zhang Zhizhong, Guo Weihua	Gao Di	
2004	格达活佛	Geda Living Buddha	Zhu De	Lu Qi	Yang Tao	
2004	任弼时	Ren Bishi	Zhu De	Wu Shanshan, Kong Xiangyu, Guo Fazeng	Wang Baohua	
2005	八路军	Eighth Route Army	Zhu De	Tang Guoqiang, Liu Jing, Guo Lianwen, Yao Jude	Song Yeming	
2005	上将许世友	General Xu Shiyou	Zhu De	Zhang Qiuge, Fan Ming, Liu Jing	An Lan	
2005	抗日名将左权	Zuo Quan	Zhu De	Sun Weimin, Zong Liqun, Li Junfeng	Zhang Youling	
2006	草原春来早		Zhu De	Wang Hui, Wang Wei	Wang Tao	
2006	船政风云		Mu Tushan	Sun Feihu, Bao Guo'an, Wang Wei	Song Yeming	
2006	雄关漫道		Zhu De	Song Jialun, Zhang Rihui	Zhang Yuzhong	
2007	井冈山	Jing Gangshan Mountains	Zhu De	Wang Ying, Pan Yuchen, Song Jialun	Jin Tao	
2007	周恩来在重庆	Zhou Enlai in Chongqing	Zhu De	Liu Jing		
2007	叶挺将军	General Ye Ting	Zhu De	Liu Jing		
2008	保卫延安	Defend Yan'an	Zhu De	Tang Guoqiang, Pan Yuchen, Yao Jude	Wan Shenghua	
2008	解放	Liberation	Zhu De	Tang Guoqiang, Liu Jing, Guo Lianwen	Tang Guoqiang, Dong Yachun	
2008	东方红	The East Is Red	Zhu De	Tang Guoqiang, Du Yulou, Sun Weimin, Guo Lianwen	Su Zhou	
2009	奠基者	The Founder	Zhu De	Zheng Xiaoning, Yin Tao	Kang Honglei	
2009	红色摇篮	The Founding of the PRC	Zhu De	Liu Jing		
2010	东方	East	Zhu De	Tang Guoqiang, Sun Weimin, Zong Liqun	Lu Qi	
2011	开国元勋朱德	The Founder of the PRC: Zhu De	Zhu De	Wang Ying, Dai Jiaoqian	Wang Wensheng	
2011	五星红旗迎风飘扬	The Five-Starred Red Flag	Zhu De	Tang Guoqiang, Chen Jianbin, Zheng Guolin	Wang Xiaoming	
2011	中国1945之重庆风云	China in 1945: Chongqing Negotiations	Zhu De	Tang Guoqiang, Zhang Guoli, Zhang Tielin, Jiang Qinqin	Zhang Guoli, Luo Chang'an	
2011	硝烟背后的战争		Zhu De	Tang Guoqiang, Zhu Hongjia, Fan Yulin	Wan Shenghua	
2012	聂荣臻	Nie Rongzhen	Zhu De	Tang Guoqiang, Liu Jing, Guo Lianwen, Lu Qi		
2012	毛泽东	Mao Zedong	Zhu De	Tang Guoqiang, Guo Lianwen, Lu Qi, Yao Jude	Gao Xixi	

=== Film ===
Year	Chinese title	English title	Role	Cast	Director	Ref.
1985	中国革命之歌	The Song of China Revolution	Zhu De			
1997	彝海结盟		Zhu De	Fu Xuecheng, Wei Jinhu, Sun Feihu		
1999	大进军大战宁沪杭	The War of Ningbo, Shanghai and Hangzhou	Zhu De	Du Yulou, Zhao Hengduo, Lv Xiaohe	Wei Linyu	
2001	走出西柏坡	Out of the Xibaipo	Zhu De	Gu Yue, Guo Fazeng, Kong Xiangyu	Li Xiefu	
2004	风起云涌	The Tide	Zhu De	Gu Yue, Guo Lianwen	Chen Guoxing	
2005	太行山上	On the Mountain of Tai Hang	Zhu De	Zong Liqun, Chen Shanshan, Xu Maomao	Wei Lian	
2006	我的长征	My Long March	Zhu De	Wang Ying, Hou Xiangling	Zhai Junjie	
2009	建国大业	The Founding of a Republic	Zhu De	Tang Guoqiang, Zhang Guoli, Xu Qing, Liu Jing	Han Sanping	
2012	决战前夜	Night Before Battle	Zhu De	Lu Qi, Guo Lianwen, Liu Jing	Zhang Chi	
2013		National Emblem				
2013		Loess Love				
2015	百团大战	Hundred Regiments Offensive	Zhu De	Tang Guoqiang, Wu Yue	Ning Haiqiang, Zhang Yuzhong	
2017	领袖1935	The Legend of 1935	Zhu De		Zhou Qi, Madelin	
2019	决胜时刻	Mao Zedong 1949	Zhu De		Huang Jianxin, Ning Haiqiang	
2023	志愿军：雄兵出击	The Volunteers: To the War	Zhu De		Chen Kaige	

== Awards ==
- 2007 11th Golden Phoenix Award
