= Xiong Naijin =

Chinese actress (born 1982)

- 熊乃瑾
- Born: October 14, 1982 (age 43); Chongqing, China
- Education: Beijing Film Academy
- Occupation: Actress
- Years active: 2003–present
- Agent: Linghe Culture Company
- Notable work: How Much Sorrow Do You Have; The Prince of Han Dynasty Part 3: Iron Blood and the Pages of History; Ice and Fire of Youth

Xiong Naijin (Chinese: 熊乃瑾; pinyin: Xióng Nǎijīn; born 14 October 1982) is a Chinese actress. She is best known for her roles as Zhou Jiamin on How Much Sorrow Do You Have, Princess Weichang on The Prince of Han Dynasty Part 3: Iron Blood and the Pages of History and Cong Hui on Ice and Fire of Youth, and has also starred in a number of films, including The First President, Tai Chi 0, Tai Chi Hero, The Deathday Party, and Ex-Files.

== Early life and education ==
Xiong was born in Chongqing, China, on October 14, 1982. In 1997 she attended the Sichuan Arts School. One year later, she entered the Sichuan Troupe of Ballad Singers, where she worked as a Qingyin actress. In 2002 she was accepted to Beijing Film Academy and graduated in 2006.

== Acting career ==
In 2003, when she was a freshman at Beijing Film Academy, Xiong made her acting debut in Crime Scene, playing a policewoman.

In 2004, she played Zhou Jiamin, Queen Zhou the Younger in the historical melodrama How Much Sorrow Do You Have. That same year, she also starred in the costume mystery drama Dixue Feicui.

In 2005, she had a key supporting role in the historical television series The Prince of Han Dynasty, playing the daughter (Princess Weichang) of Huang Xiaoming's and Ruping's characters. That same year, she had a minor role as Qiu Xiang in the costume drama The First Marriage.

In 2006, she was cast in the lead role of Wulan in the wuxia television series Big Shots, based on the novel by the same name by Gu Long.

In 2008, she appeared in The Last Prince, a historical television series starring Feng Yuanzheng and Xu Fan. That same year, she co-starred with Chen Kun and Li Xiaoran in Remembrance of Dreams Past.

In 2009, she participated in Ghost Catcher - Legend of Beauty, a shenmo television series.

In 2010, she filmed in All Men Are Brothers as Yan Xijiao, adapted from Shi Nai'an's classical novel Water Margin. That same year, she had a cameo appearance in the fantasy historical drama Beauty World. She made her film debut in Choy Lee Fut Kung Fu, a Kung fu film.

In 2011, she headlined the comedy film Scheme With Me. She then appeared in the film The First President, in which she played Soong Ai-ling. She also featured in romance film Great Wall My Love.

In 2012, she had a supporting role in the martial arts film Tai Chi 0 and its sequel, Tai Chi Hero. She played the female lead role in Li Qilin's romantic comedy film Rhapsody of BMW. She then starred in the war television series Jiu He Ru Hai.

In 2013, she starred in the romantic comedy television series Destiny by Love. She played the female lead role in the suspense thriller film The Deathday Party.

In 2014, she co-starred in the romantic comedy television series My Amazing Bride, and youth drama Ice and Fire of Youth. She had a minor role as Mengmeng in romantic comedy film Ex-Files.

In 2015, she dubbed the voice of Chang'e in the animated film Mr. Nian. The same year, she guest-starred on the fantasy series Noble Aspirations playing Youji, one of four great messengers of the Ghost King Faction.

In 2016, Xiong Naijin had a key supporting role in Phoenix Warriors, a fantasy television series adaptation based on the novel Meiren Mou by Bing Lansha.

In 2017, she starred in the youth film Invictus Basketball, directed by Li Feng.

In 2019, Xiong starred in fantasy drama L.O.R.D. Critical World.

== Filmography ==
=== Film ===
Year	English title	Chinese title	Role	Notes
2010		蔡李佛拳	Zang Rou	
2011	The First President	第一大总统	Soong Ai-ling	
2012	Great Wall, My Love	追爱	young Zhang Xiuqian	
2012	Rhapsody of BMW	宝马狂想曲	Hu Mo	
2012	Scheme With Me	双城计中计	Jiaozi	
2012	Tai Chi 0	太极1：从零开始	Chen's wife	
2012	Tai Chi Hero	太极2：英雄崛起	Chen's wife	
2014	Breakup Buddies	心花怒放	Kang Xiaoyu's best friend	
2014	A Motor Home Adventure	房车奇遇	Liu Tong	
2014	The Deathday Party	死亡派对	Jenny	
2015	The Puzzle of Human Skin	人皮拼图	Su Su	
2015	Ex-Files	前任攻略	Mengmeng	
2017	Invictus Basketball	不败雄心	Feifei	
2017	Hanson and the Beast	一代妖精		
2017	Standing on the Tuyere	站在风口上		

=== Television series ===
Year	English title	Chinese title	Role	Notes
2004	Crime Scene	案发现场	Liu Miao	
2004		滴血翡翠	Chen Huiping	
2005	How Much Sorrow Do You Have	问君能有几多愁	Zhou Huimin	
2005	The First Marriage	天下第一媒	Qiu Xiang	
2006	The Prince of Han Dynasty Part 3	大汉天子	Princess Weichang	
2007	Big Shot	大人物	Princess Wulan	
2008	Who Knows My Heart	谁懂我的心	Wei Chun	
2008	The Last Prince	最后的王爷	Huazi	
2008		步步惊魂	Shi Jia	
2009	Remembrance of Dreams Past	故梦	Shui Piaoping	
2010	Ghost Catcher - Legend of Beauty	天师钟馗	Zi Meigui	
2010	Two Girls	两个女孩的那些事	Xiao Xiong	
2011	Beauty World	唐宫美人天下	Li Ruo	
2011	All Men Are Brothers	水浒传	Yan Xijiao	
2012	Beijing Love Story	北京爱情故事	Guest appearance	
2012		九河入海	Fu Zhenzhu	
2012	The Girls	女人帮·妞儿	Ka Si	
2013	Longmen Express	龙门镖局	Wen Ya	
2013	Destiny by Love	非缘勿扰	Yang Yang	
2013	The Girls 2	女人帮·妞儿第二季	Ka Si	
2015	Ice and Fire of Youth	冰与火的青春	Cong Hui	
2015	My Amazing Bride	极品新娘	Liu Jia	
2015	Horrible Bosses	恶老板	Bai Xiaoyu	
2016	Noble Aspirations	青云志	Youji	
2017	Phoenix Warriors	凤凰无双	Concubine Yun	
2018	Double Happiness	欢乐无双	Lu Xiaohuan	
2019	L.O.R.D. Critical World	爵迹·临界天下	Lian Quan	
2021	Never Say Goodbye	不说再见	Li Yihu	
2021	Please! 8 Hours	拜托了！8小时		

=== Animated film ===
Year	English title	Chinese title	Role	Notes
2016	Mr. Nian	年兽大作战	Chang'e	

=== Variety show ===
Year	English title	Chinese title	Role	Notes
2015	Real Hero	真心英雄	Cast member	
2015	X-space Season II	星星的密室第二季	Cast member	

=== Music video appearances ===
Year	Song title	Singer	Notes
2009	The Count of Three, Let It Go (数到三，一起放手)	Wang Zhengliang	
