= Yu Chenglong =

Qing dynasty politician (1617–1684)

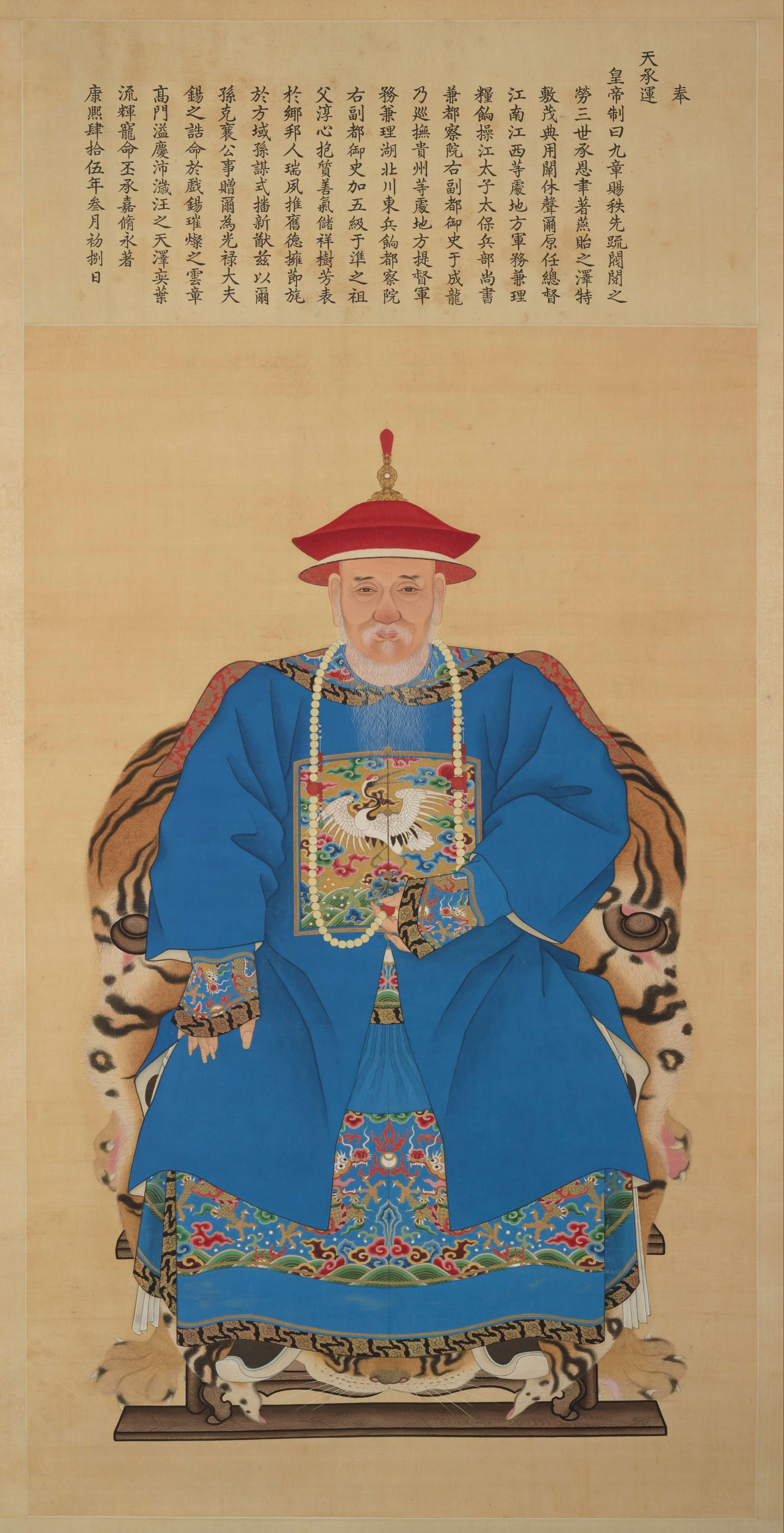
Portrait of Yu Chenglong.

Yu Chenglong (Chinese: 于成龍; pinyin: Yú Chénglóng; Wade–Giles: Yü Ch’eng-lung; 1617–1684), courtesy name Beiming (北溟), art name Yushan (於山), was a Chinese government official active during the Qing dynasty.

== Career ==
Yu was appointed governor of Zhili in March 1680. In February 1682, he was named governor-general of Jiangnan (Jiangsu and Anhui) and Jiangxi and assumed his post three months later.

== Legacy ==
Yu remains well known in China for his incorruptibility. In October 2014, Shanxi party chief secretary Wang Rulin ordered the restoration of Yu's tomb in Lüliang, as "a constant reminder for cadres to remain beyond reproach". Amidst a national anti-corruption drive, Yu Chenglong, a 40-episode television drama produced by China Central Television and Shanxi Film and Television Group, premiered on 3 January 2017 in China.
