= The Founding of a Republic =

- Film poster
- Traditional Chinese: 建國大業
- Simplified Chinese: 建国大业
- Hanyu Pinyin: Jiàngúo Dà Yè
- Jyutping: Gin3 gwok3 Daai6 Jip6
- Directed by: Huang Jianxin; Han Sanping
- Written by: Chen Baoguang; Wang Xingdong
- Produced by: Huang Jianxin; Han Sanping
- Starring: Tang Guoqiang; Zhang Guoli; Xu Qing; Liu Jing; Chen Kun; Wang Wufu
- Cinematography: Zhao Xiaoshi
- Edited by: Derek Hui; Xu Hongyu
- Music by: Sun Nan
- Production companies: China Film Group; Shanghai Film Studio; Media Asia Films; Emperor Motion Pictures; Universe Entertainment; Polybona Films; China Movie Channel; Beijing Guoli Changsheng Movies & TV Productions; Beijing Hualu Baina Film & TV Production; Jiangsu Broadcasting Corporation; DMG Entertainment; Beijing Xinbaoyuan Movie & TV Investment
- Distributed by: China Film Group; Beijing Polybona Film Distribution (China); Media Asia Films Distribution (Hong Kong)
- Release date: 16 September 2009
- Running time: 138 minutes
- Country: China
- Language: Mandarin
- Budget: $8.8–$10 million
- Box office: US$62.5 million RMB¥420 million

The Founding of a Republic is a Chinese historical drama produced in 2009 to mark the 60th anniversary of the People's Republic of China and was made to portray the final years of the Chinese Communist Revolution that followed the end of the Second Sino-Japanese War (1937–1945). This film was co-directed by Huang Jianxin and Han Sanping, and includes many famous actors such as Andy Lau, Ge You, as well as other directors such as Jiang Wen, and Chen Kaige. The main protagonists Mao Zedong and Chiang Kai-shek were played by highly renowned actors, Tang Guoqiang and Zhang Guoli. One of the purposes of this movie aside from reenacting the events of the Chinese Communist Revolution was to also attract a younger audience to view films that revolved around government propaganda, which they aim to accomplish by including famous actors that would draw the attention of the youth.

According to the executive at one of China's top multiplex chains, this film is also unique because the film unusually marries "the core of an 'ethically inspiring' film with commercial packaging.". Additionally, this is the first zhuxuanlu (主旋律; i.e. propaganda) film to work solely with cinematic audio-visual methods to achieve its political and ideological goals. It is a milestone in that since its production in 2009, the distinction between zhuxuanlu and commercial film has become blurred; they have become primarily indistinguishable from each other. This film was released on September 16, 2009, in mainland China and during its release, it had a tremendous amount of support from the Chinese Communist Party (CCP).

== Plot ==
In August 1945, Japan announced its unconditional surrender, ending eight years of resistance warfare. However, national unification had not yet been achieved. Although the Nationalist government (Kuomintang, or KMT) claimed to have taken control of the country, its actual authority was limited. Meanwhile, the Communist Party had built a strong political, military, and popular base in the areas it had liberated behind enemy lines. Mao Zedong and other members of the Chinese Communist Party (CCP) travel to Chongqing to meet with Chiang Kai-shek and the Kuomintang (KMT). This meeting aims to consider a peace negotiation between the two parties and hopefully discuss the beginning of a democratic nation. With assistance from the China Democratic League (led by Zhang Lan), Mao Zedong and Chiang Kai-shek signed the Double Tenth Agreement on October 10, 1945. Both parties agreed to stop the civil war and establish a multi-party government within China. However, deep-rooted differences between the CCP and the KMT made this reconciliation impossible. With the opening of the One-party National Assembly and the attack on the central plains liberated area, the Double Tenth Agreement finally broke down in the following year, which led to the resumption of the civil war.

Since July 1947, the People's Liberation Army shifted its tactics from strategic defence to offence in regions under KMT rule, marking the beginning of the process of bringing China under communist rule. During this time, Chiang Kai-shek called for a National Assembly in Nanjing, where he was elected as the first President of the Republic of China (ROC). His elected vice president was Li Zongren, a known rival within the party. In May 1948, the CCP issued the "May Day Declaration" in Baoding, Hebei, proclaiming the overthrow of the KMT and calling for the prompt convening of a Political Consultative Conference to discuss and realize the establishment of a People's Congress and a democratic coalition government. During this period, corruption within the KMT became severe, and the situation on the Northeastern Front grew increasingly urgent. As a result, the democratic united front against the KMT continued to expand and gain strength, after CCP declared the opening of a "War of Liberation" against Chiang's ROC government, with many other political parties responding to the call and taking the CCP's side, including the China Democratic League, the Revolutionary Committee (China) and other political figures such as Zhang Lan, Soong Ching-ling and Li Jishen.

Following numerous victories for the CCP in China's central and southern regions, Chiang Kai-shek was forced to resign as president, and his forces retreated to Taiwan in December 1949. On September 21, 1949, the First Plenary Session of the Chinese People's Political Consultative Conference was grandly held in Beijing. On October 1, 1949, Mao declared the founding of the People's Republic of China, with Beijing, formally named Beiping, as its capital, marking the start of a new era for China.

== Production ==
The Founding of a Republic, is a historical drama that is shot in many locations including Tianjin, Beijing, Shanghai, and Nanjing to re-create historical events during the Chinese Communist Revolution. The production of this film was commissioned by China's film regulator, the China Film Administration (CFA), and was produced by the publicly funded China Film Group (CFG). This film was co-directed by Huang Jianxin and Han Sanping, the chairman of the China Film Group, and includes many famous actors including Andy Lau, Ge You, Hu Jun, Leon Lai, Zhang Ziyi, Donnie Yen, Jackie Chan, Jet Li, Zhao Wei, as well as other directors such as Jiang Wen, Chen Kaige, and John Woo. The main protagonists were played by highly renowned actors, Tang Guoqiang and Zhang Guoli, who played Mao Zedong and Chiang Kai-shek. One interesting aspect of this film was that a CFH spokesman revealed that many of the stars that appeared in the film waived their fee, which kept the film's budget quite modest. The initial budget of the film was 30 million Yuan (US$4.7 million), however, the finalized cost was 60-70 million Yuan, which is the equivalent of US 8.8-10 million dollars.

== Themes and Analysis ==
=== Propaganda ===
Rather than relying on didactic messaging, the film's utilitarian approach aims to promote the legitimacy of the Communist Party while remaining competitive in a commercial film market that is increasingly influenced by Hollywood. Han Sanping, one of the film's key producers and a significant figure in China's film industry, explicitly stated that the goal was to "blend mainstream ideology and commercial methods," positioning the film as both a political tool and a marketable product. Similarly, co-director Huang Jianxin emphasized his intention to make "a real film instead of a propaganda flick," selecting to humanize historical figures and use a variety of cinematic techniques to engage audiences, demonstrating a desire of the film's creators to not only be aware of the challenges of making politically themed films for modern viewers but also to craft a more sophisticated and relatable narrative. This blend of ideological purpose and commercial strategy shows a broader shift in how political cinema operates in post-reform China.

The film moved away from casting Chiang Kai-shek as 'evil' versus Mao Zedong like what was common in other Chinese media on the subject (such as the 1965 musical The East Is Red), and emphasizing instead that the contingencies of war led the communists to victory.

=== Historical representation ===
In its introduction to the film's historical background, China News Service stated that "The Founding of a Republic," as a tribute to the 60th anniversary of the founding of the People's Republic of China, centers on the story of Mao Zedong and other founding figures uniting various democratic parties and people's organizations to convene the Chinese People's Political Consultative Conference and form a new government. The article connects the historical background of the film with events such as the preparation for the new CPPCC, the participation of democratic parties in the nation-building process, and the founding of the People's Republic of China.

== Critical response ==
=== Positive responses ===
The film was a massive financial success in mainland China, earning 420 million yuan and eventually becoming the highest-grossing Chinese-made film ever for a brief time until it was surpassed the following year by Jiang Wen's Let the Bullets Fly (2010).

Many critics also recognized how The Founding of a Republic has evolved public state-narrated presentation of past historical figures and events. For example, many applauded the film for its more "objective" retelling of some characters, such as Chiang Kai-shek, who is characterized in a more sympathetic light compared to past movies. As Gloria and M.E. Davies have emphasized, many online commentators, "praised the film's makers for departing from former 'good vs. evil' representations of Mao and Chiang to emphasize instead the contingencies of war that led the Communists to victory".

A review of the Shanghai International Film Festival argues that The Founding of a Republic is both a major revolutionary historical film and a narrative film. Some scholars consider The Founding of a Republic a representative work in the commercial transformation of mainstream Chinese films.

=== Negative responses ===
Even though the film made some efforts to highlight history as an honest struggle for democracy, many other commentators felt disappointed that the movie offered a distorted revisionist theme of the nation's history and the Chinese Communist Party's full politics. As G and M.E. Davies highlighted, the film seemed to be more focused on presenting a "historical romp rather than a disciplined treatment of the subject". Further critics such as Chiang Ping, former editor of the Southern Weekend, have called out the film for highlighting "the limits of the contemporary Party-guided commercial repackaging of Chinese history".

Eventually, the Chinese film rating site Douban had to disable the rating feature for The Founding of a Republic, as well as the other films within the trilogy, because of their negative impact.

In response to some reactions outside mainland China, Huang Jianxin, the film's co-director, "has said it was unfair to describe The Founding of a Republic as propaganda since modern Chinese audience was too sophisticated to swallow a simplistic rendering of history."

== Cast ==
=== Main figures ===
Actor	Role	Description
Tang Guoqiang	Mao Zedong	Chairman of the Chinese Communist Party (CCP), later Chairman of the PRC Central People's Government
Zhang Guoli	Chiang Kai-shek	President of the Republic of China (ROC), Director-General of the Kuomintang (KMT)
Xu Qing	Soong Ching-ling	Sun Yat-sen's wife; later Vice President of the People's Republic of China (PRC)
Liu Jing	Zhou Enlai	Vice Chairman of the CCP, later Premier of the PRC
Chen Kun	Chiang Ching-kuo	Chiang Kai-shek's son; Youth League of the Three People's Principles leader, later President of the ROC
Wang Wufu	Zhu De	Commander-in-chief of the Red Army, later Vice Chairman of the PRC
Wang Xueqi	Li Zongren	Vice President of the ROC
Liu Sha	Liu Shaoqi	CCP Central Committee secretary, later President of the PRC
Wang Jian	Ren Bishi	CCP Central Committee secretary
Jin Xin	Li Jishen	NRA general, later Vice Chairman of the PRC
Wang Bing	Zhang Lan	Chairman of the China Democratic League, later Vice Chairman of the PRC
Vivian Wu	Soong Mei-ling	Chiang Kai-shek's wife and Soong Ching-ling's sister; later First Lady of the ROC
Xiu Zongdi	Fu Zuoyi	Chairman of Chahar government, later PRC Water Resources Minister

=== Chinese Communist Party figures ===
Actor	Role	Description
Huang Wei	Deng Yingchao	Zhou Enlai's wife; later Chinese People's Political Consultative Conference Chairwoman
Shi Xin	Deng Xiaoping	CCP Central Committee secretary, later Chairman of the CMC
Zong Liqun	Peng Dehuai	Second-in-command of the Red Army, later Vice Chairman of the CMC
You Liping	Lin Biao	Red Army general, later Vice Chairman of the PRC
Che Xiaotong	Liu Bocheng	Red Army general, later Marshal of the PLA, nicknamed The One-eyed Dragon
Zhao Yong	He Long	Red Army general, later Marshal of the PLA and Vice Premier of the PRC
Gu Wei	Chen Yi	Red Army general, later Foreign Minister of the PRC
Sun Jitang	Luo Ronghuan	Red Army general, later Marshal of the PLA, served as a Vice Chair of the Standing Committee of the National People's Congress.
Wang Jun	Xu Xiangqian	Red Army general, later one of the Ten Marshals of the PLA
Ao Yang	Nie Rongzhen	Red Army general, later Marshal of the PLA, commanded the Northern China Military Region during the Chinese Civil War
Ye Jin	Ye Jianying	Red Army general, later Vice Chairman of the CCP Central Committee
Hou Yong	Chen Geng	Red Army general, served as a spy in the National Revolutionary Army for 6 years
Zhao Ningyu	Liu Yalou	Red Army general, served as the inaugural commander-in-chief of the PLA Air Force
Zhang Erdan	Jiang Qing	Mao Zedong's wife
Xie Gang	Gao Gang	Vice Chairman of the CCP Central Committee, later Vice Chairman of the State Planning Commission
Wang Huaying	Pan Hannian	CCP politician, later Deputy Mayor of Shanghai
Huang Xiaoming	Li Yinqiao	Mao Zedong's chief bodyguard
Ma Yue	Yan Changling	Mao Zedong's chief bodyguard
Donnie Yen	Tian Han	Lyricist for March of the Volunteers, later member of the PRC Culture Ministry
Xu Fan	Liao Mengxing	Liao Zhongkai and He Xiangning's daughter; Soong Ching-ling's secretary, later member of the All-China Women's Federation
Chen Hao	Fu Dongju	Fu Zuoyi's daughter; People's Daily reporter
Chen Daoming	Yan Jinwen	Deputy leader of Shanghai Investigative Branch of State Secrets Department
Zhang Ziyi	Gong Peng	PRC Foreign Affairs Ministry official

=== Kuomintang figures ===
Actor	Role	Description
Leon Lai	Cai Tingkai	NRA general, later CCP member
Chen Kaige	Feng Yuxiang	Chiang Kai-shek's sworn brother, NRA general, Vice President of National Military Council
Jiang Wen	Mao Renfeng	Head of BIS
Hu Jun	Gu Zhutong	Commander-in-chief of NRA; later Chief of staff of NRA
Andy Lau	Yu Jishi	NRA general, served with distinction during the Battle of Shanghai
Chen Baoguo	Zhou Zhirou	NRA Air Force general
Jet Li	Chen Shaokuan	NRA Navy admiral, later NPC member
Xiao Wenge	He Yingqin	Politician and one of the most senior generals of the KMT during Republic of China
You Yong	Bai Chongxi	NRA general of Hui ethnicity and of the Muslim faith
Li Qiang	Chen Cheng	NRA general, later Vice President of the Republic of China
Yang Xiaodan	Zhang Zhizhong	NRA general, later CCP member
Tong Dawei	Kung Ling-kan	Kung Hsiang-hsi and Soong Ai-ling's son
Cao Kefan	Wu Kuo-chen	Mayor of Shanghai, later Governor of Taiwan Province
Zhong Xinghuo	Huang Shaoxiong	Vice President of Control Yuan, later NPC member
Xia Gang	Shao Lizi	NRA secretary, later NPC member
Ding Zhicheng	Lu Guangsheng	BIS agent
Tao Zeru	Wu Tiecheng	Vice President of Legislative Yuan, later Senior Advisor to the Office of the President of the ROC
Xu Huanshan	Yu Youren	President of Control Yuan
Zhao Xiaoshi	Sun Fo	Sun Yat-sen's son; President of Legislative Yuan
Sun Xing	Du Yuming	NRA general, defeating the Communist general Lin Biao twice at Siping
Lin Dongfu	Gan Jiehou	Li Zongren's private secretariat representative
Ye Xiaojian	Dai Jitao	President of Examination Yuan
Zhang Hanyu	Liu Congwen	KMT spy as an undercover agent in the Chinese Communist Party

=== China Democratic League figures ===
Actor	Role	Description
Ge Cunzhuang	Tan Pingshan	KMT Revolutionary Committee member
Zhang Shizhong	Shen Junru	CDL member, later President of the PRC Supreme People's Court
Bi Yanjun	Luo Longji	CDL member, later CCP member
Wu Gang	Wen Yiduo	Poet, CDL member
Qiao Lisheng	Guo Moruo	Author, poet, historian, archaeologist; later President of the Chinese Academy of Sciences
Deng Chao	Xu Beihong	Artist, later President of the China Central Academy of Fine Arts
Li Bin	He Xiangning	Artist, CDL member, later CCP member
Zhang Qiufang	Li Dequan	Feng Yuxiang's wife; member of the KMT Revolutionary Committee, later PRC Health Minister
Liu Yiwei	Li Huang	Chinese Youth Party founder

=== Other notable historical figures ===
Actor	Role	Description
Feng Xiaogang	Du Yuesheng	Shanghai Green Gang boss
John Woo	Liu Wenhui	Sichuan warlord
Feng Yuanzheng	Phillip Fugh	John Leighton Stuart's personal assistant

=== Foreign political figures ===
Actor	Role	Description
Aleksandr Pavlov	Joseph Stalin	Soviet Union leader
Donald Eugene McCoy	George C. Marshall	United States military leader, later Secretary of State and Secretary of Defense
Donald Freeman	Patrick J. Hurley	United States Ambassador to China
Leslin H Collings	John Leighton Stuart	United States Ambassador to China, President of Yenching University

=== Fictional characters ===
Actor	Role
Sun Honglei	Hu Liwei, Central Daily News reporter
Fan Wei	Guo Bencai, Mao Zedong's cook
Liu Ye	Red Army old soldier
Ge You	Red Army Fourth Division leader
Wang Baoqiang	Red Army Fourth Division soldiers
Wang Xuebing	Red Army Fourth Division soldiers
Eva Huang	Xinhua News Agency broadcaster
Jackie Chan	Reporter interviewing Li Jishen
Chen Hong	Reporter interviewing Zhang Lan
Li Youbin	Newspaper agency head
Zhang Jianya	Chiang Kai-shek's deputy
Lian Jin	Zhou Zhirou's deputy
Sun Xing	Yu Jishi's deputy
Guo Xiaodong	NRA officer
Liu Ye	KMT police officers
Huang Zixuan	KMT police officers
Guo Degang	Cameraman
Zhang Shen	Translator accompanying Liu Shaoqi to the Soviet Union
Gong Beibi	Red Army female soldiers
He Lin	Red Army female soldiers
Yang Ruoxi	Red Army female soldiers
Che Yongli	Red Army female soldiers
Tony Leung Ka-fai	CPPCC members
Feng Gong	CPPCC members
Zhao Wei	CPPCC members
Miao Pu	CPPCC members
Dong Xuan	CPPCC members
Chen Shu	CPPCC members
Ning Jing	CPPCC members
Shen Aojun	CPPCC members
Wang Yajie	CPPCC members
Zhao Baoyue	CPPCC members
Wang Fuli	CPPCC members

== Controversy surrounding actors' nationalities ==
Before the release of the film, news had circulated that 21 actors in the film, including Chen Kaige and Chen Hong, are foreign nationals. Particularly due to the film's popularity and connection to the sixtieth anniversary of the People's Republic of China, this controversy quickly attracted large media attention.

Some critics, such as Shanghai writer Han Han, have pointed to the film's strong nationalist themes to highlight the irony of foreign nationals' involvement, especially when understanding how “the communist ideals of the film might translate into today’s world”. On September 17, 2009, National Radio and Television Administration (NRTA) spokesman Zhu Hong formally stated that Tang Guoqiang and the other ten main actors of The Founding of a Republic are in fact Chinese nationals. Zhu Hong said in a question-and-answer session that the other actors in the film were all guest stars, and the vast majority were Chinese nationals, thus assuring that the film is in line with the "regulations for employing foreign creators to participate in the filming of domestic films" and that the main actors in Chinese films do not exceed one-third of the provisions of foreign personnel.

== Award and nominations ==
Award name	Award	Award winner	Result
30th Hundred Flowers Awards	Best Film		Won
30th Hundred Flowers Awards	Best Director	Han Sanping、Huang Jianxin	Nominated
30th Hundred Flowers Awards	Best Actor	Zhang Guoli	Nominated
30th Hundred Flowers Awards	Best Supporting Actress	Xu Qing	Won
29th Hong Kong Film Awards	Best Asian Film		Nominated
10th Changchun Film Festival	Golden Deer Award (Best Film)		Won
17th Beijing College Student Film Festival	Outstanding Contribution Award		Won
19th Shanghai Film Critics Awards	Film of Merit		Won
5th Chinese American Film Festival	outstanding film award		Won
1st Macau International Movie Festival	Best Supporting Actress	Xu Qing	Won
28th Golden Rooster Awards	Best Sound		Won

== Trivia ==
- When asked in an interview why he made the film, director Han Sanping said, "When Zhang Heping (former vice chairman of the Beijing Committee of the Chinese People's Political Consultative Conference) called me, he wanted me to direct the film, and he gave many reasons. But what finally convinced me was that he said, ‘It's the 60th anniversary of the founding of New China, so I should really come to the front line to give a little power and leave a memento.’ Finally, the leaders of the Film Administration and Zhao Shi, deputy director of the General Administration, decided to let me be the general director and do my best to make the film." At the same time, he said, "Now if I were to categorize The Founding of a Republic, I would say it is a Chinese ‘heroic epic film’.”
- After filming The Soong Sisters, Wu Junmei had resolved never to play Soong Mei-ling again. One important reason was that when she views the finished film and saw that the scenes "Xi'an Incident" and "Congress Speech" were cut, Wu Junmei felt that the character of Soong Mei-ling in the film had deviated from the script she had seen at the beginning. In addition, she felt Soong Mei-ling is a very difficult character, to an extent that she "grows more unconfident as the filming progresses". However, after 12 years of accumulating life experience, she reprised her role as Soong Mei-ling in The Founding of a Republic.
- This is the 14th time that Tang Guoqiang has played Mao Zedong on the screen since 1996. Tang Guoqiang was 56 years old when the film was shot, and Mao Zedong was exactly 56 years old in 1949. After many years, Tang is very much in Mao's element, both in terms of temperament and image.
- For example, when Ge You and Jackie Chan were invited to join The Founding of a Republic, they both expressed a desire to portray one of the great historical leaders. However, their appearances differed significantly from the actual figures in history. The director certainly recognized their commitment and acting talent, but due to the stark mismatch in physical resemblance, he ultimately had to turn them down. After all, when it came to the roles of iconic historical figures, the director already had someone in mind: Tang Guoqiang, a well-known actor famous for playing such roles. In this particular arena, Tang Guoqiang had a clear advantage—his extensive experience and his appearance made him an ideal fit. With just a look or a gesture, he could seemingly bring the great leaders back to life from the pages of history. Perhaps because of this, Jackie Chan, Ge You, and others understood that they didn't have the same edge, and they willingly accepted the alternative roles assigned by the director.

== Music ==
"Zhui Xun" is a song performed by Sun Nan, and also serves as the theme song for the film The Founding of a Republic. The lyrics were written by Zhang Heping, and the music was composed by Shu Nan. The song was first included in the film's official soundtrack, released on January 20, 2010, and later featured in Sun Nan’s personal music album Living Beautifully, released on May 5, 2010.

In 2010, Sun Nan was nominated for Best Male Singer (Mainland China) at the 14th Global Chinese Music Awards for this song.

In June 2024, the song was honored with the "Unforgettable Film Golden Melody of the Era" award at the 2024 Film and Television Music Festival.

=== Background of music composition ===
"Zhui Xun" was a song specially composed by Zhang Heping and Shu Nan for the film The Founding of a Republic. As the film's theme song—and given that the film itself was a tribute to the 60th anniversary of the founding of the People's Republic of China—many prominent artists, including Jackie Chan and Andy Lau, volunteered during production to perform the song. However, after the demo version was completed, the production team felt that Sun Nan was the most suitable vocalist and officially invited him to perform it.

During the composition process, the song underwent seven revisions, and the melody of "The Internationale" was incorporated into the chorus. Additionally, the recording featured a 60-member choir and a fully arranged symphony orchestra.

==== Track listing ====
1. Prologue
2. Pursuit
3. Who Will Rule
4. The Declining City
5. Stern Silence
6. Unbearable Lightness
7. Storm Over the Sea
8. What to Say
9. Interlude of Suffering
10. The Calm After Release
11. The One Who Carries a Lantern in the Dark
12. Nightmare
13. Bombing Chennan Village
14. Flash Before Extinction
15. Black Clouds Over the City
16. The Vanishing City of Bauhinia
17. Sigh for the People
18. Black-and-White Years
19. Morning in Shanghai
20. Restless Night
21. In Silence
22. I Offer My Blood for China
23. Elegy
24. Long Search
25. Mourning
26. Dreaming of Shostakovich
27. Fields of Blooming Flowers
28. Before the Dawn
29. Distant Call from the Sacred Land
30. A Moment's Leisure
31. Sweet Twin Violins
32. Joy of New Birth
33. Abandonment
34. A Nation in Dreams
35. Red

== See also ==
- The Founding of a Party
- The Founding of an Army
