= Song Yeming =

Chinese director (born 1954)

- 宋业明
- Born: 1954 (age 71–72); Rongcheng, Shandong, China
- Education: Beijing Film Academy
- Occupation: Director
- Years active: 1988–present
- Agent: August First Film Studio
- Notable work: Charging Out Amazon
- Political party: Chinese Communist Party

Chinese name
- Traditional Chinese: 宋業明
- Simplified Chinese: 宋业明
Transcriptions
Standard Mandarin
- Hanyu Pinyin: Sòng Yèmíng

Song Yeming (Chinese: 宋业明; born 1954) is a Chinese director. Song is noted for Charging Out Amazon, which earned him an Outstanding Film Award and an Outstanding Director Award at the Huabiao Awards and a Best Picture Award at the Golden Rooster Awards.

== Biography ==
Born in Rongcheng, Shandong in 1954, Song Yeming graduated from Beijing Film Academy, majoring in Director department. He worked in August First Film Studio since 1973.

== Filmography ==
=== Film ===
Year	English title	Chinese title	Role	Notes
1989	Decisive Engagement: The Liaoxi-Shenyang Campaign	大决战·辽沈战役	Director	
1995	The Great Military March Forward: Engulf the Southwest	大进军·席卷大西南	Director	
1999	38°N	北纬三十八度线	Director	
2001	Charging Out Amazon	冲出亚马逊	Director	
2004	Heroes of the First Sino-Japanese War	甲午海魂	Director	
2008	The First of August	八月一日	Director	
2010	The Incident of September 18	九月杀	Director	

=== Television ===
Year	English title	Chinese title	Role	Notes
1988	The War Xinkou	忻口战役	Director	
1992	The War in Siping	喋血四平	Director	
1993	Amateur Supervisor	编外监察官	Director	
1994		状元老表	Director	
1997	Dignity	不跪的人	Director	
1997	Long Border	漫长的边界	Director	
1998	Peng Dehuai in Hunan, Hubei, and Jiangxi	彭德怀铁血湘鄂赣	Director	
2002	Zhang Xueliang	张学良	Director	
2003	A Tribute to Yanan	延安颂	Director	
2004	The Eighth Route Army	八路军	Director	
2006		船政风云	Director	
2009	Dajingmen	大境门	Director	
2011	Night Light	夜凖	Director	
2014	Out of Tongguan	出关	Director	
2014	Marshal Peng Dehuai	彭德怀元帅	Director	
2016		危机迷雾	Director	
2019	Diplomatic Situation	外交风云	Director	

== Awards ==
Date	Award	Category	Work	Result	Notes
12 September 2002	8th Huabiao Awards	Outstanding Film	Charging Out Amazon	Won	
12 September 2002	8th Huabiao Awards	Outstanding Director	Charging Out Amazon	Won	
22 October 2002	22nd Golden Rooster Awards	Best Picture	Charging Out Amazon	Won	
2003	22nd China TV Golden Eagle Awards	Second Prize	Zhang Xueliang	Won	
2003	24th Flying Apsaras Awards	Full-length Television Series First Prize	A Tribute to Yanan	Won	
2006	23rd China TV Golden Eagle Awards	Golden Eagle Award for Best Television Series	The Eighth Route Army	Nominated	
2006	26th Flying Apsaras Awards	Outstanding Full-length Television Series First Prize	The Eighth Route Army	Won	
2007	9th Changchun Film Festival	Special Jury Prize	The First of August	Won	
2007	13th Huabiao Awards	Outstanding Film	The First of August	Won	
