= Johnny Zhang =

Chinese actor and singer

- Born: Zhang Wei; March 22, 1985 (age 41); Nanjing, Jiangsu, China
- Occupations: Actor; singer
- Years active: 2007–present

Chinese name
- Traditional Chinese: 張峻寧
- Simplified Chinese: 张峻宁
Transcriptions
Standard Mandarin
- Hanyu Pinyin: Zhāng Jùnníng

Johnny Zhang Junning (simplified Chinese: 张峻宁; traditional Chinese: 張峻寧, born March 22, 1985) is a Chinese actor and singer. He made his acting debut in the Chinese television drama, Five Star Hotel (2007), and achieved popularity in China.

== Life and career ==
Zhang was born and raised in Nanjing, Jiangsu, China. He graduated from Shanghai Theatre Academy. He made his acting debut in the Chinese television drama, Five Star Hotel in 2007. His debut EP, Xiao Fei Xia was released in 2008. In 2011, he appeared in the Taiwanese television drama, Sunny Girl, which helped him gain recognition in Taiwan. In 2017, he co-starred in the Chinese fantasy television series, Fighter of the Destiny.

== Filmography ==
=== Film ===
| Year | English title | Chinese title | Role | Notes | Ref |
|---|---|---|---|---|---|
| 2008 | Fit Lover | 爱情呼叫转移2 | Yu Tong | | |
| 2009 | High School Musical | 歌舞青春 | Shi Ren | | |
| 2011 | The First President | 第一大总统 | Chiang Kai-shek | | |
| 2014 | Nature Law | 拆散专家 | Tai | | |
| 2015 | Scary Road Is Fun | 陌路惊笑 | Liu Wei | | |
| 2018 | The Burns of Sin | 只能活一个 | Su Cheng | | |

=== Television series ===
| Year | English title | Chinese title | Role | Notes |
|---|---|---|---|---|
| 2007 | Five Star Hotel | 五星大饭店 | Pan Yulong | |
| 2007 | Lost in the Dream | 梦里花落知多少 | Gu Xiaobei | |
| 2007 | Hong Kong Sisters | 香港姊妹 | Gao Tianrui | |
| 2009 | Stage of Youth | 青春舞台 | Ding Xiao | |
| 2009 | Founding Eve | 开国前夜 | Qi Zhangpeng | |
| 2011 | Sunny Girl | 阳光天使 | Geng Fei | |
| 2012 | My Sassy Girl | 牵牛的夏天 | Ma Yingjie | |
| 2012 | The Girls | 女人帮·妞儿 | Ka Si's ex-boyfriend | |
| 2013 | Happy Noodle | 幸福的面条 | Zhang Jian | |
| 2014 | Lanterns | 花灯满城 | Chen Feipu | |
| 2015 | Flying Swords of Dragon Gate | 龙门飞甲 | Hu Zhongyu | |
| 2015 | Legend of Ban Shu | 班淑传奇 | Song Cheng | |
| 2016 | Road to the North | 一念向北 | Cen Jiexi | |
| 2016 | Love is So Beautiful | 恋爱真美 | Bai Ping | |
| 2016 | Border Town Prodigal | 新边城浪子 | Lu Xiaojia | |
| 2017 | Be With You | 不得不爱 | Li Muchen | |
| 2017 | Magic Star | 奇星记之鲜衣怒马少年 | Qian Yishou | |
| 2017 | Fighter of the Destiny | 择天记 | Qiushan Jun | |
| 2017 | My Mr. Mermaid | 浪花一朵朵 | Lin Zi | |
| 2018 | The Legend of Jade Sword | 莽荒纪 | Dong Qi | |
| 2018 | Our Glamorous Time | 你和我的倾城时光 | Ding Weikai | |
| 2019 | My Poseidon | 我的波塞冬 | Mo Liang | |
| 2019 | From Survivor to Healer | 爱上你治愈我 | Hou Junming | |
| 2019 | The Great Craftsman | 筑梦情缘 | Du Shaogan | |
| 2020 | Renascence | 凤唳九天 | Ye Hongyi | |
| 2020 | Breath of Destiny | 一起深呼吸 | Liao Yu | |

=== Variety and reality show ===
| Year | Title | Notes |
|---|---|---|
| 2022 | Call Me by Fire | Season 2 |

== Discography ==
=== Extended plays ===
| Year | English title | Chinese title | Notes |
|---|---|---|---|
| 2008 | Xiao Fei Xia | 小飞侠 | |

=== Singles ===
| Year | English title | Chinese title | Album | Notes |
|---|---|---|---|---|
| 2010 | "Let's Gather Together" | 我们欢聚一堂 | High School Musical OST | |
| 2010 | "One Day" | 有一天 | High School Musical OST | |
| 2010 | "The World is a Big Stage" | 世界是个大舞台 | High School Musical OST | |
| 2010 | "No Problem" | 没问题 | High School Musical OST | |

== Awards ==
| Year | Award | Category | Nominated work | Notes |
|---|---|---|---|---|
| 2010 | 14th China Music Awards | Best New Singer | Xiao Fei Xia | |
