= The Birth of New China =

1989 film

- Film poster
- Directed by: Li Qiankuan; Xiao Guiyun
- Written by: Chen Guo; Liu Xing; Zhang Tianmin; Zhang Xiaotian
- Starring: Gu Yue
- Edited by: Wu Fanghai
- Production company: Changchun Film Studio
- Distributed by: Huaxia Film Distribution (2019 re-release); Wuzhou Film Distribution (2019 re-release)
- Release date: 21 September 1989
- Running time: 163 minutes
- Country: China
- Language: Mandarin
- Box office: ¥100 million

The Birth of New China (Chinese: 开国大典; pinyin: kāiguó dàdiǎn; lit. 'State Foundation Ceremony') is a 1989 Chinese drama film directed by Li Qiankuan and Xiao Guiyun. The film was selected as the Chinese entry for the Best Foreign Language Film at the 62nd Academy Awards, but was not accepted as a nominee.

The film tells the events in summer 1949 that lead to the proclamation of the People's Republic of China in Beijing the 1st October 1949.

In 2019 it got a 4K remaster.

== Cast ==
- Fazeng Guo
- Gu Yue
- Huang Kai
- Liu Huaizheng
- Lü Qi
- Niu Xingli
- Sun Feihu
- Chen Jiming

== Box office ==
The film grossed ¥100 million ($27 million) in China.

== See also ==
- List of submissions to the 62nd Academy Awards for Best Foreign Language Film
- List of Chinese submissions for the Academy Award for Best Foreign Language Film
