= Guo Lianwen =

Chinese actor (1952/1953 – 2024)

- 郭连文
- Born: 1952/1953; China
- Died: 13 February 2024 (aged 71)
- Education: Central Academy of Drama
- Occupation: Actor
- Years active: 1990–2024
- Notable work: Mao Zedong; Eighth Route Army; Long March
- Political party: Chinese Communist Party

Guo Lianwen (simplified Chinese: 郭连文; traditional Chinese: 郭連文; pinyin: Guō Liánwén) (1952/1953 – 13 February 2024) was a Chinese actor. Guo was the President of Film School of Beijing Central Minzu University and China Children's Art Theatre, and the vice-president of China Artist Association.

Guo won the Chian Golden Eagle Award, 17th Flying Apsaras Award and 11th China Gold Star Award for his role in Comrade Shaoqi.

Guo died on 13 February 2024, at the age of 71.

== Works ==
=== Television ===
Year	Chinese Title	Title	Role	Cast	Director	Ref
1990	《渴望》	Hope	a worker	Zhang Kaili, Huang Meiying, Li Xuejian, Zheng Qianlong	Lu Xiaowei	
1995	《东周列国春秋篇》		Xi Peng/ Zi Yu	Tang Guoqiang, Yan Huaili, Zhang Guangbei, Du Yuegang	Wang Feng, Shen Haofang	
1997	《西藏风云》	The Story of Tibet	Liu Shaoqi	Liu Yongsheng, Lu Qi, Gu Yue, Sun Weimin	Zhai Junjie	
1998	《东周列国战国篇》		Zhao Xiangzi	Cao Peichang, Yang Tongshu, Li Hongtao, Du Zhiguo	Yan Jian'gang	
1998	《少奇同志》	Comrade Shaoqi	Liu Shaoqi	Li Kejian, Wang Wufu, Zong Liqun, Sun Weimin	Sun Bo	
1999	《文成公主》	Wen Cheng Princess	Li Daozong	Zhu Na, Fan Xiao, Bian Hongli	Fan Sihe	
1999	《开国领袖毛泽东》	Chairman Mao	Liu Shaoqi	Tang Guoqiang, Liu Jing, Sun Feihu, Wang Wufu	Yang Guangyuan, Wang Jixing	
2000	《长征》	The Long March	Liu Shaoqi	Tang Guoqiang, Liu Jing, Wang Wufu, Chen Daoming	Jin Tao, Tang Guoqiang	
2000	《抗美援朝》	The Korean War	Liu Shaoqi	Ding Xiaoyi, Gu Yue, Yao Jude	Li Qiankuan	
2001	《中原突围》	War of Central Plains	Liu Shaoqi	Xu Ping, Guo Weihua, Liu Yongsheng, Yao Jude	Shi Wei	
2002	《彭真》	Peng Zhen	Liu Shaoqi	Gu Yue, Wang Wufu, Xia Liyan	Wang Limin	
2003	《新四军》	The New Fourth Army	Liu Shaoqi	Wu Jing'an, Feng Guoqing, Liu Zhibing		
2003	《延安颂》	The Song of Yan'an	Liu Shaoqi	Tang Guoqiang, Liu Jing, Wang Wufu, Yao Jude	Song Yeming	
2004	《巾帼英雄穆桂英》	The Story of Mu Guiying	Yang Liulang	Brenda Wang, Fan Bingbing, Lu Shiyu, Wang Liyuan	Fan Sihe	
2005	《八路军》	Eighth Route Army	Liu Shaoqi	Tang Guoqiang, Liu Jing, Wang Wufu, Yao Jude	Song Yeming	
2007	《彭雪枫》	Peng Xuefeng	Liu Shaoqi	Sun Hongtao, Qin Fanyi, Wang Wufu		
2008	《刘少奇故事》	The Story of Liu Shaoqi	Liu Shaoqi	Pan Yutong, Shi Chao, Zhang Bin	Wang Baohua	
2008	《保卫延安》	Defend Yan'an	Liu Shaoqi	Tang Guoqiang, Pan Yuchen, Yao Jude	Wan Shenghua	
2008	《解放》	Liberation	Liu Shaoqi	Tang Guoqiang, Liu Jing, Wang Wufu	Tang Guoqiang, Dong Yachun	
2008	《东方红》	The East Is Red	Liu Shaoqi	Tang Guoqiang, Du Yulou, Sun Weimin, Wang Wufu	Su Zhou	
2009	《北平战与和》	War of Beiping	Liu Shaoqi	Liu Jing, Chen Yiheng, Li Kejian	Zhang Qian	
2009	《矿哥矿嫂的平凡生活》	The Ordinary Life of The Worker Couple	a worker	Tao Yuling, Wang Yonggui, Liu Caiyun	Fan Sihe	
2010	《奠基者》	The Founder	Liu Shaoqi	Zheng Xiaoning, Yin Tao	Kang Honglei	
2011	《五星红旗迎风飘扬》	The Five-Starred Red Flag	Liu Shaoqi	Tang Guoqiang, Chen Jianbin, Zheng Guolin	Wang Xiaoming	
2011	《中国1945之重庆风云》	China in 1945: Chongqing Negotiations	Liu Shaoqi	Tang Guoqiang, Zhang Guoli, Zhang Tielin, Jiang Qinqin	Zhang Guoli, Luo Chang'an	
2012	《五星红旗迎风飘扬第二季》	The Five-Starred Red Flag 2	Liu Shaoqi	Tang Guoqiang, Ma Xiaowei, Sun Weimin, Lu Qi	Wang Xiangwei	
2012	《毛泽东》	Mao Zedong	Liu Shaoqi	Tang Guoqiang, Wang Wufu, Lu Qi, Yao Jude	Gao Xixi	

=== Film ===
Year	Chinese Title	Title	Role	Cast	Director	Ref
1987	《凶手与懦夫》	The Murder and The Coward	Zhang Fenglin	Tian Shaojun, Xiao Yan, Li Weitian	Da Shibiao	
1996	《大转折》	The Great Transformation	Yang Yong	Lu Qi, Sun Weining, Fu Xuecheng, Ma Yongsheng	Wei Lian	
1996	《诸葛亮》	Zhu Geliang	Sima Yi	Liu Yong, Ke Junxiong, Gordon Liu, Li Qingxiang	Ke Junxiong, Wu Ma	
2003	《毛泽东去安源》	Mao Zedong in Anyuan	Liu Shaoqi	Wang Ying, Ruan Danning, Wu Youcai	Kang Jianmin	
2004	《风起云涌》	The Tide	Liu Shaoqi	Gu Yue, Sun Weimin, Wang Wufu	Chen Guoxing	
2004	《张思德》	Zhang Side	Liu Shaoqi	Tang Guoqiang, Wu Jun, Zou Shuang	Yin Li	
2005	《中国1949》	China in 1949	Liu Shaoqi	Zhao Dengfeng, Guo Weihua, Liu Guoping	Yu Jiwei	
2012	《决战前夜》	Night Before Battle	Liu Shaoqi	Lu Qi, Liu Jing, Wang Wufu	Zhang Chi	

== Awards ==
Year	Work	Award	A/N	Ref
1998	Comrade Shaoqi	Chian Golden Eagle Award	Won	
1998	Comrade Shaoqi	17th Flying Apsaras Award	Won	
1998	Comrade Shaoqi	11th China Gold Star Award	Won	
