= Li Zheng (educator) =

Chinese educator and politician

- 李蒸

Member of the National Committee of the Chinese People's Political Consultative Conference
- In office 1949–1975
- Chairman: Mao Zedong; Zhou Enlai

Member of the Legislative Yuan
- In office January 1948 – 1949
- President: Sun Fo

President of Beiping Normal University
- In office July 1932 – August 1945
- Preceded by: Xu Xusheng
- Succeeded by: Li Jinxi

Personal details
- Born: May 22, 1895 Luanzhou, Hebei, China
- Died: February 2, 1975 (aged 79) Beijing, China
- Party: Kuomintang; Revolutionary Committee of the Chinese Kuomintang
- Parent: Li Zhentang
- Education: Beijing Normal University; Columbia University

Li Zheng (Chinese: 李蒸; pinyin: Lǐ Zhēng; 22 May 1895 – 2 February 1975), courtesy name Yunting (云亭; 雲亭), was a Chinese educator and politician.

== Biography ==
Li was born in Luanzhou (today's Tangshan), Hebei, on May 22, 1895. He lost his mother when he was young. He secondary studied at Tianjin High School. He studied English at Beijing Higher Normal School (now Beijing Normal University) before pursuing advanced studies at Columbia University in the United States in 1923.

Li returned to China in 1928 and successively taught at Peking University, Beiping University and Beiping Normal University. In July 1932, he was appointed president of Beiping Normal University. In 1948, he became a member of the Standing Committee of the Kuomintang Central Committee. On March 24, 1949, the Executive Yuan held a meeting and decided to appoint Shao Lizi, Zhang Zhizhong, Huang Shaohong, Zhang Shizhao and Li Zheng as representatives of the peace talks. On April 1, Zhang Zhizhong, Li Zheng and others arrived in Beiping. Mao Zedong and Zhou Enlai talked to Zhang Zhizhong, Shao Lizi and Li Zheng to exchange views. After the breakup of the Peace Talks, he announced his secession from the Kuomintang.

In September 1949, Li was elected a member of the 1st National Committee of the Chinese People's Political Consultative Conference. He became a counsellor of the Government Council of the Central People's Government. He was a member of the 2nd, 3rd and 4th National Committee of the Chinese People's Political Consultative Conference. He was a member of the Central Committee of the Revolutionary Committee of the Chinese Kuomintang.

On February 2, 1975, he died of a heart attack.

Educational offices
Preceded by Xu Xusheng	President of Beiping Normal University; 1932–1945	Succeeded by Li Jinxi
