= Gu Yue =

Chinese actor

Gu Yue (古月）
- Born: Hu Shixue (胡诗学); December 26, 1937; Hubei, China
- Died: July 2, 2005 (aged 67); Sanshui District, Foshan, Guangdong, China
- Occupation: Actor
- Years active: 1978-2005
- Spouse: Zhang Yan (张燕)

Gu Yue (Chinese: 古月; pinyin: Gǔ Yuè) (December 26, 1937 – July 2, 2005), originally named Hu Shixue (胡诗学), was a Chinese actor. Noted for his uncanny resemblance to Mao Zedong, with whom he shares a birthday, he played the former Chinese leader 84 times from 1978 until his death.And throughout his life, he only ever played Mao Zedong. He won the Best Actor titles at China's Hundred Flowers Awards in 1990 and again in 1993.

== Personal life ==
Feng Mu, a cultural leader, found Gu at an orphanage after the liberation of Nanning, Guangxi. Feng trained Gu to become a member of an army theater troupe as a teenager. The two ultimately lost contact for a period of 40 years, reconnecting after Feng wrote an article praising Gu's performance as Mao in the 1983 film Crossing the Chishui River Four Times (based on Battle of Chishui River), not realizing that the performer was the boy he had rescued from an orphanage.

Gu and his wife Zhang Yan had a son.

Gu's personal life was low-profile.

== Career ==
Marshal Ye Jianying chose Gu to portray Mao in the August First Film Studio's 1983 film Crossing the Chishui River Four Times. Gu had extensive training to internalize Mao's accent, gestures, and comportment.

Gu played the role of Mao in The Song of the Chinese Revolution.

Gu only performed the role of Mao in his career.

The Chinese Communist Party did not generally permit Gu to do product endorsements. He was permitted to appear at a charity concert, but was criticized by the public for the amount of money he made for the appearance and the perception that his appearance had harmed the dignity and mystique of Mao Zedong. In a newspaper interview, Gu stated, "To play a leader, you have to be prepared to make some sacrifices."

== Death ==
On July 2, 2005, while staying in southern China, Gu suffered a heart attack shortly after bathing in a sauna and was rushed to a hospital, where he was pronounced dead at 11:09 pm.

== Filmography ==
=== Film ===
Year	English title	Original title	Role
1981	The Xi'an Incident	西安事变	Mao Zedong
1982	—N/a	四渡赤水	Mao Zedong
1988	—N/a	彭大将军	Mao Zedong
1989	The Birth of New China	开国大典	Mao Zedong
1991	Decisive Engagement: The Liaoxi-Shenyang Campaign	大决战：辽沈战役	Mao Zedong
1991	—N/a	大决战：淮海战役	Mao Zedong
1991	—N/a	大决战：平津战役	Mao Zedong
1991	—N/a	决战之后	Mao Zedong
1992	—N/a	重庆谈判	Mao Zedong
1993	—N/a	中国出了个毛泽东	Mao Zedong
1993	The Story of Mao Zedong	毛泽东的故事	Mao Zedong
1995	—N/a	金戈铁马	Mao Zedong
1996	The Great Military March Forward: Engulf the Southwest	大转折--鏖战鲁西南	Mao Zedong
1996	—N/a	大转折--挺进大别山	Mao Zedong
1996	The Great Military March Forward: Liberate the Northwest	大进军--解放大西北	Mao Zedong
1997	The Great Military March Forward: Pursue and Wipe Out in the South	大进军--南线大追歼	Mao Zedong
1997	—N/a	旭日惊雷	Mao Zedong
1999	The Great Military March Forward: Fight for Nanjing, Shanghai and Hangzhou	大战宁沪杭	Mao Zedong
1999	Sworn Brothers	肝胆相照	Mao Zedong
2000	—N/a	毛泽东与斯诺	Mao Zedong
2001	—N/a	走出西柏坡	Mao Zedong
2002	Uncle Kurban Visits Beijing	库尔班大叔上北京	Mao Zedong
2005	—N/a	风起云涌	Mao Zedong

=== Television ===
Year	English title	Original title	Role	Note
1987	—N/a	古城情恨	Mao Zedong	
1991	—N/a	南阳大会战	Mao Zedong	
1991	—N/a	七战七捷	Mao Zedong	
1993	—N/a	豫东之战	Mao Zedong	
1997	—N/a	西藏风云	Mao Zedong	
1998	—N/a	上海沧桑	Mao Zedong	
1998	—N/a	中国命运的决战	Mao Zedong	
—N/a	—N/a	抗美援朝	Mao Zedong	Unreleased
2001	—N/a	向前,向前!	Mao Zedong	
2002	—N/a	彭真	Mao Zedong	
2008	Ren Bishi (TV series)	任弼时	Mao Zedong	Posthumous release

== Awards and nominations ==
Year	Award	Category	Work	Result
1990	13th Hundred Flowers Awards	Best actor	The Birth of New China	Won
1993	16th Hundred Flowers Awards	Best actor	The Story of Mao Zedong	Won
