= Tang Guoqiang =

Chinese actor

- Born: 4 May 1952 (age 74); Qingdao, Shandong, China
- Years active: 1975–present
- Spouse: Zhuang Li
- Children: 2
- Awards: Huabiao Film Awards – Best Actor; 1998 Long March (movie) Golden Rooster Awards – Best Supporting Actor; 2005 Zhang Side China TV Drama Flying Awards – Best Actor; 2001 Founder Leader Mao Zedong; Best Actor; 2003 Long March (TV drama); Best Directing for a Television Series; 2003 Long March (TV drama) China TV Golden Eagle Award – Best Actor; 1999 Yongzheng Dynasty; Best Actor; 2001 White Snow and Red blood Best Actor; 2002 Long March (TV drama); Best Directing for a Television Series; 2002 Long March (TV drama); Lifetime Achievement Award; 2004 Absolute Power

Chinese name
- Traditional Chinese: 唐國強
- Simplified Chinese: 唐国强
Transcriptions
Standard Mandarin
- Hanyu Pinyin: Táng Guóqiáng
Yue: Cantonese
- Jyutping: Tong4 gwok3 keung4

Tang Guoqiang (Chinese: 唐国强, born 4 May 1952) is a Chinese actor, best known for portraying historical figures. Some of his more notable roles include: various Chinese emperors (e.g. Emperor Taizong of Tang, Yongle Emperor, Yongzheng Emperor), Zhuge Liang, Yan Zhenqing and Mao Zedong. Tang started his acting career when he first joined a performance troupe in 1970 after graduating from middle school. He made his film debut in 1975 as the male lead in Storm over the South China Sea.

== Early life and education ==
Tang was born in Qingdao, Shandong, on 4 May 1952, while his ancestral home in Yantai. After graduating from Qingdao No.39 High School, he joined the Qingdao Drama Troupe in 1970 and then the August First Film Studio in 1975.

== Acting career ==
Tang rise to fame started in 1979, with his role in the military-themed film Little Flower, becoming something of a pop idol after his appearance in the mythological romance flick, Peacock Princess, in 1982. In 1990, Tang played the ancient politician and strategist Zhuge Liang in the epic TV drama Romance of Three Kingdoms, and through the years he would become a specialist interpreting historic figures, such as Li Shimin and Yongzheng.

He is also well known for his performances of Mao Zedong, starting in 1996, when Tang starred with Li Lin and Ma Xiaowei in Zhai Junjie's war film The Long March. Since then, he has portrayed Mao in over 40 television dramas and movies. Among these are his appearance in the 2009 main melody film The Founding of a Republic, which became the highest grossing domestic film in history at the time.

== Personal life ==
Tang is married to actress Zhuang Li and they have a son named Tang Yinghan (born in 1995). Tang also has a daughter named Tang Lili (born in 1983) from a previous marriage to Sun Tao.

== Filmography ==
=== Film ===
Year	Title	Role	Notes
1975	Storm Over the South China Sea 南海风云	Yu Hualong	
1977	Zouzai Zhanzheng Qianmian 走在战争前面	Li Tiecheng	
1979	Little Flower 小花	Zhao Yongsheng	
1980	The Stars Are Bright Tonight 今夜星光灿烂	He Zhanyun	
1981	Peacock Princess 孔雀公主	Zhao Shutun	
1983	A Long Way to Go 路漫漫	Cheng Kang	
1983	Sidu Chishui 四渡赤水	Lu Qingsong	
1984	Wreaths at the Foot of the Mountain 高山下的花环	Zhao Mengsheng	
1987	Gongheguo Buhui Wangji 共和国不会忘记	Lan Yumeng	
1989	Anli Xiaojie 安丽小姐	Lin Yiping	
1989	Little Emperors 中国的"小皇帝"	Lin Jie	
1989	Long Yun Yu Jiang Jieshi 龙云与蒋介石	Long Shengwu	
1996	The Long March 长征	Mao Zedong	
2004	Zhang Side 张思德	Mao Zedong	
2009	The Founding of a Republic 建国大业	Mao Zedong	
2009	Xunzhao Weichen 尋找微塵		guest star
2015	Hundred Regiments Offensive	Mao Zedong	
2015	Cairo Declaration	Mao Zedong	
2017	The Founding of an Army		
2019	The Code on the Fingertips		
2019	Mao Zedong 1949 决胜时刻	Mao Zedong	
2021	I Am Mao	Mao Zedong	Mao's biopic in English
2023	The Volunteers: To the War	Mao Zedong	

=== Television ===
Year	Title	Role	Notes
1982	Bai Jinbei 白金杯	Officer	
1983	Tianxia Diyi Guan 天下第一關	Xiao Xian	
1989	Lengxue 冷血	Shang Wuqiang	
1990	Mingtian Bushi Meng 明天不是梦	Zhong Shan	
1990	Fengxian 奉献	Technician	
1990	Changzhenghao Jinye Qifei 长征号今夜起飞	Hu Yang	
1994	Romance of the Three Kingdoms 三國演義	Zhuge Liang	
1996	Kingdoms of the Spring and Autumn Period of the Eastern Zhou Dynasty 东周列国春秋篇	Duke Zhuang of Zheng	
1997	The Water Margin 水浒传	Su Shi	cameo
1998	Yongzheng Dynasty 雍正王朝	Yongzheng Emperor	
1998	Zheng Banqiao Waizhuan 郑板桥外传	Qianlong Emperor	
1998	Zhanguo Hongyan 战国红颜	King Goujian of Yue	
1999	Kaiguo Lingxiu Mao Zedong 开国领袖毛泽东	Mao Zedong	
1999	Xiaozhangfu 小丈夫	Gao Yeye	
1999	Return of Justice Bao 包公出巡	Cao Hong	
2000	Zhongguo Zhapian Daan Jishi 中国诈骗大案纪实		host
2000	Li Wei the Magistrate 李卫当官	Yongzheng Emperor	
2000	Zheng Chenggong 郑成功	Zhu Yujian	
2000	Zhang Wentian Yu Liu Ying 张闻天与刘英	Mao Zedong	
2000	Baogong Shengsijie 包公生死劫	Emperor Renzong of Song	
2000	The Long March 长征	Mao Zedong	director
2001	Love Legend of the Tang Dynasty 大唐情史	Emperor Taizong of Tang	
2001	Dajiao Ma Huanghou 大脚马皇后	Hongwu Emperor	
2002	Juedui Quanli 绝对权力	Qi Quansheng	
2002	Zhengjiu 拯救	Complainer	
2002	Nüren Tang 女人汤	Lin Tianquan	
2002	Yijiang Chunshui 一江春水	Wei Zhilin	
2002	Gongsu 公诉		host and artistic director
2002	Xuebai Xuehong 雪白·血红	Ma Qi	
2003	High Flying Songs of Tang Dynasty 大唐歌飞	Emperor Xuanzong of Tang	
2003	Li Wei the Magistrate II 李卫当官 II	Yongzheng Emperor	
2003	Diezhan Zhi Teshu Jiaoliang 谍战之特殊较量	Liao Peng	
2003	Wo Shengming Zhong De Ganlan Shu 我生命中的橄榄树	Xiao Zhenxiong	
2003	Yongle Ernü Yingxiong Zhuan 永乐儿女英雄传	Jianwen Emperor	
2003	Yan'an Song 延安颂	Mao Zedong	artistic director
2003	Kangding Qingge 康定情歌	Muya Qudeng	
2003	The Affaire in the Swing Age 江山风雨情	Hong Taiji	alternative title Love Against Kingship
2004	Xuese Shiyan 血色誓言	Chu Qi	
2004	Jiajing Fengyun 嘉靖风云	Jiajing Emperor	
2004	Zhang Boling 张伯苓	Zhang Boling	
2004	Zhaojun Departs the Frontier 昭君出塞	Emperor Xuan of Han	
2004	Dahan Beige 大汉悲歌	Prince of Jiangxia	
2004	Chuanqi Huangdi Zhu Yuanzhang 传奇皇帝朱元璋	Guo Zixing	alternative title Zhu Yuanzhang Huanxiang (朱元璋还乡)
2005	Carol of Zhenguan 贞观长歌	Emperor Taizong of Tang	
2005	Xian Xinghai 冼星海	Mao Zedong	
2005	Eighth Route Army 八路军	Mao Zedong	
2005	The Great Dunhuang 大敦煌	Li Yuanhao	
2005	Chuanguo Yuxi 传国玉玺	Yongle Emperor	
2005	Zheng He Xia Xiyang 鄭和下西洋	Yongle Emperor	artistic director; alternative title Da Hanghai (大航海)
2005	Xiongguan Mandao 雄關漫道	Mao Zedong	
2005	Bishu Shanzhuang Da Chuanqi 避暑山莊大傳奇	Lei family descendant	
2006	Wanli Shoufu Zhang Juzheng 万历首辅张居正	Zhang Juzheng	
2006	Hujia Hanyue 胡笳汉月	Tuoba Tao	
2006	Nanyue Wang 南越王	Qin Shi Huang	
2006	Baiqiuen 白求恩	Mao Zedong	
2006	Xi'an Shibian 西安事变	Mao Zedong	
2006	Chisong Weilong 赤松威龙	Emperor	
2006	Huang Feihong Wuda Dizi 黄飞鸿五大弟子	Boss Jin	
2006	The Sword and the Chess of Death 魔剑生死棋	Jianzu	
2007	Wenzhou Ren Zai Bali 温州人在巴黎	Wan Zhenguo	
2007	Zhou Enlai in Chongqing 周恩来在重庆	Mao Zedong	
2007	Yingxiong Wuming 英雄无名	Yan Baohang	
2007	The Legend and the Hero 封神榜之凤鸣岐山	Yuanshi Tianzun	guest star
2007	Su Dongpo 蘇東坡	Emperor Renzong of Song	guest star
2008	Datang Shuhun Yan Zhenqing 大唐书魂颜真卿	Yan Zhenqing	
2008	The Legend and the Hero 2 封神榜之武王伐纣	Yuanshi Tianzun	guest star
2008	Zhentan Chengxu 2: Qiannian Miju 偵探成旭2: 千年謎局	Police inspector	
2008	Baowei Yanan 保衛延安	Mao Zedong	
2008	Qizhi 奇志	Qi Tianshun	
2008	The East Is Red 東方紅	Mao Zedong	
2008	Jiefang 解放	Mao Zedong	director
2009	Jinfeng Huakai 金鳳花開	Mao Zedong	
2009	Tonglingzi 同齡子		
2009	Dongfang 東方	Mao Zedong	director
2009	Bao Qingtian Qixia Wuyi 包青天七俠五義	Emperor Zhenzong of Song	
2010	Journey to the West 西游记	Jade Emperor	
2010	Huang Yanpei 黄炎培	Mao Zedong	
2011	Journey to the West 西游记	Yuanshi Tianzun	
2011	1911 Revolution 辛亥革命		director
2011	Secret History of Empress Wu 武则天秘史	Emperor Taizong of Tang	
2012	Legend of Yuan Empire Founder 建元風雲	Genghis Khan	
