= August First Film Studio =

Chinese military film studio

- Company type: State-run film distributor, production company
- Industry: Chinese cinema
- Founded: August 1, 1952; 73 years ago
- Founders: People's Liberation Army
- Headquarters: Beijing, China
- Key people: Huang Hong
- Products: film

August First Film Studio
- Traditional Chinese: 八一電影製片廠
- Simplified Chinese: 八一电影制片厂
Transcriptions
Standard Mandarin
- Hanyu Pinyin: Bāyī Diànyǐng Zhìpiànchǎng

August First Film Studio, or Bayi Film Studio (Chinese: 八一电影制片厂; pinyin: Bāyī diànyǐng zhì piàn chǎng), is the only military film studio in China. Founded on August 1, 1952, it is a comprehensive film studio with the production capacity of feature films, battlefield documentaries, military education films, news documentaries, national defense scientific research films, TV dramas and other films. The unit's main business area is located in Fengtai District, Beijing, and consists of Wang Zuo Film and Television Base and Hubei Film and Television Base.

== History ==
In March 1951, with the approval of the Culture and Education Commission and the Central Military Commission of the Central People's Government of the People's Republic of China, the Military Education Film Studio of the General Political Department of the Central Military Commission was launched to provide the People's Liberation Army with its own documentary film production facilities following the best practices in the world.

On August 1, 1952, PLA Day, the studio was officially opened and named the People's Liberation Army Film Studio (Chinese: 解放军电影制片厂) in honour of the PLA's silver jubilee. In the early days of the studio, it mainly produced military educational films and news documentaries. In 1955, the studio was granted funding to produce feature films on its own, breaking a brief monopoly by the China Film Group Corporation. From then on, PLA Film and CFGC carried a duopoly in the Chinese film industry until the 1990s.

In 1956, it was rebranded as August First (Bayi) Film Studio.

The 1963 August First Studio film Serfs is a movie depicting the fictional story of a young man named Jampa who grows up as a serf in Tibet and takes refuge as a monk in a monastery. The plot is a gender-reversed version of The White-Haired Girl archetype: Jampa has been rendered after being beaten by for eating food offerings at a Buddhist altar and is rescued from serfdom by his childhood girlfriend Namga (now a Communist Party cadre) who arrives with the People's Liberation Army. Like The White-Haired Girl, Serfs is part of the genre of redemptive melodrama.Serf were part of a genre of redemptive melodramas, which sought to encourage audiences to "speak bitterness". Portraying traditional Tibetan society as feudal, the movie was intended to advance China's narrative of civilizing Tibet. The cast included Tibetans who were former serfs.

The August First Film Studio produced two military pedagogical films which were widely shown throughout the Cultural Revolution decade, Landmine Warfare and Tunnel Warfare. Set during the Second Sino-Japanese War, Landmine Warfare depicts villagers who become guerillas bury homemade mines to oppose Japanese invaders. Tunnel Warfare depicts villagers who become guerillas and build a network of tunnels in which invading enemy troops ultimately become trapped. Tunnel Warfare highlighted the principles discussed in Mao's pamphlet On Protracted War and also taught viewers how to build underground bunkers. Tunnel Warfare was viewed approximately 1.8 billion times.

Bayi Film Studio adheres to the direction of serving the people and serving socialism, and implements the policy of "letting a hundred flowers bloom and a hundred schools of thought contend", reflecting the struggle and life of the PLA through its history and on the military history of the Chinese nation at large over the centuries, and shaping the screen image of outstanding servicemen and women, to educate the PLA in general on socialism, patriotism, collectivism and revolutionary heroism, and to promote the revolutionization, modernization and regularization of the forces to all Chinese and viewers globally.

In April 1982, the monthly magazine "August 1st Film" was first published, which is a comprehensive film publication focusing on film literature.

August Film Studio's 1983 film Crossing the Chishui River Four Times featured Gu Yue playing the role of Mao Zedong. Marshal Ye Jianying chose Gu for the role over other performers because of his close physical resemblance to Mao.

In January 1995, it was renamed "Chinese and Foreign Military Film and Television - August 1st Studio". In 2018, according to the decision of the Central Military Commission, it was renamed anew as the Film and Television Production Department of the PLA Cultural and Art Center of the Political Work Department, keeping the Bayi Studio as its primary brand for its productions.

As of 2014, more than 2,200 films (series) of various kinds have been produced. Among them were:

- 236 feature films (including stage art films)
- 571 military educational films and national defense scientific research films (series)
- 1049 documentaries (series)
- 6 art films.
- 9 high-definition digital movies
- 81 television series
- 70 television movies/made for TV movies
- 79 dubbed films

Among them, 78 won the Excellent Film Award of the Ministry of Culture and the Ministry of Radio, Film and Television of the People's Republic of China, 30 won the Literary and Art Award of the Chinese People's Liberation Army, 12 won the Excellent Film Award of the General Political Department, and 11 won the Excellent Film Award of the General Staff and the General Political Department. Military Education Film Award, 33 films won the Excellent Film Award of the General Staff Department, 10 films won the "Popular Film" Hundred Flowers Award, 19 films won the Golden Rooster Award for Chinese Films, 3 films won the Golden Bridge Award for Chinese Documentary Series, and 1 film won the National Youth and Children's Literature and Art Works Creation Award; 3 people won the "Popular Film" Hundred Flowers Award for individual awards, and 44 people won the Chinese Film Golden Rooster Awards for individual awards. In addition, 13 films and 11 people have won awards internationally.

"Youth" directed by Feng Xiaogang was released at the end of 2017.

== Organization ==
- Department of Feature Film Production (Chinese: 故事片部)
- Department of Military Education (Chinese: 军教影片部)
- Department of Television Production (Chinese: 电视部)
- Department of Film and TV Technology (Chinese: 技术部)
- Audiovisual and 3D Department (Chinese: 三环音像部)
- Videos City (Chinese: 影视基地)

The main operating area of the Bayi Film Studio of the Chinese People's Liberation Army is located in Fengtai District, Beijing, and it consists of two studios, Wangzuo Film and Television Studio Complex and Hubei Film and Television Studios, which are operated by the studios.

The film and television production teams of Bayi Film Studio includes script creation, pre-shooting, post-production, technical support, publicity and distribution and other departments. Professional positions offered included film restoration, color matching, pyrotechnics, scenery setting, costumes, photography maintenance and lighting.

== List of heads ==
No.	Name	Chinese name	Took office	Left office	Ref
1	Situ Huimin	司徒慧敏	1952	1953	
2	Chen Bo	陈播	1952	1966	
3	Zhang Shaoting	张少庭	1966	1968	
4	Peng Bo	彭渤	1968	1975	
5	Liu Jia	刘佳	1975	1978	
6	Zhang Jinghua	张景华	1978	1985	
7	Xiao Mu	萧穆	1985	1992	
8	Wang Xiaotang	王晓棠	1992	1998	
9	Zheng Zhenhuan	郑振环	1998	2001	
10	Ming Zhenjiang	明振江	2001	2011	
11	Huang Hong	黄宏	2011	2015	
12	TBD		2015	present	
