= 31st China TV Golden Eagle Awards =

Chinese TV awards ceremony in 2022

- Date: 6 November 2022
- Site: Golden Eagle Film and Television Culture City
- Hosted by: He Jiong; Wang Kai

Television coverage
- Channel: Hunan Television

31st China TV Golden Eagle Awards
- Simplified Chinese: 第31届中国电视金鹰奖
- Traditional Chinese: 第31屆中國電視金鷹獎
Transcriptions
Standard Mandarin
- Hanyu Pinyin: Dì Sānshīyījiè Zhōngguó Diànshì Jīnyīngjiǎng

The 31st China TV Golden Eagle Awards ceremony was held in Changsha, Hunan, China, on 6 November 2022.

== Winners and nominators ==
Best Television Series	Lifetime Achievement Award
The Awakening Age; Refinment Of Faith; Enemy; Medal of the Republic; The Mission of Top Secret; Crossing the Yalu River; A Lifelong Journey; Minning Town; The Stage	Lü Zhong; Zhou Zhentian
Best Director	Best Screenwriter
Li Lu–A Lifelong Journey; Dong Yachun–Crossing the Yalu River; Gao Xixi–Decisive Victory; Kong Sheng–Minning Town; Mao Weining–Refinement of Faith; Zhang Yongxin–The Awakeing Age	Long Pingping–The Awakeing Age; Qian Linsen–The Mission of Top Secret; Wang Hailing–A Lifelong Journey; Wang Sanmao–Minning Town; Wang Xiaoqiang–Enemy; Yu Fei–Crossing the Yalu River
Best Actor	Best Actress
Lei Jiayin–A Lifelong Journey; Ding Yongdai–Crossing the Yalu River; Guo Jingfei–Enemy; Huang Xuan–Minning Town; Yu Hewei–The Awakening Age; Zhang Jiayi–The Stage	Yin Tao–A Lifelong Journey; Jiang Shuying–Nothing But Thirty; Rayzha Alimjan–Minning Town; Wu Yue–Crime Crackdown; Yan Ni–The Stage; Zhou Xun–Medal of the Republic: The Gift from Tu Youyou
Best Supporting Actor	Best Supporting Actress
Ma Shaohua–The Awakening Age; Wang Yang–The Rebel; Li Naiwen–Qin Dynasty Epic; Liu Yijun–Reset; Cheng Taishen–People's Justice; Yang Shuo–Like a Flowing River	Ma Li–Beyond; Sa Rina–A Lifelong Journey; Huang Xiaolei–A Lifelong Journey; Jin Jing–Remembrance of Things Past; Song Chunli–People's Justice; Yan Bingyan–Enemy
Television Documentary	Best TV Variety (Art) Program
Out of Poverty; China; Zhu Xi; Return to Hongqi Canal; For Peace; Xiling Seal-Engravers' Society; Asia Pacific War Trial; The 100 Years of the Communist Party of China	Central Radio and Television Station 2021 Mid Autumn Festival Gala; The "Most Beautiful Night of 2021" Bilibili Evening Party; 2021 Season of the "Chinese Festival" Series of Programs; Ode to the Earth; 2022 Fujian New Year Celebration Night; Spiritual Power; Time's Answer Sheet; Singing for the Central Axis of Beijing
Best Host	Best TV Animated
Ren Luyu–Central Radio and Television Station 2021 Mid Autumn Festival Gala; Chen Chen–Time's Answer Sheet; Liu Jing–Singing for the Central Axis of Beijing; Lu Jian–Central Radio and Television Station 2021 Mid Autumn Festival Gala; Pang Xiaoge–2021 Season of the "Chinese Festival" Series of Programs; Xie Nan–The "Most Beautiful Night of 2021" Bilibili Evening Party	Ice Hockey Whirlwind; Matin Matin; Pet Hotel; The Secret of the Cave of Light Gems in the Forbidden City; Fox Peach and Old Immortal; Tracks in The Snowy Forest; Flag Cruiser
