= 32nd China TV Golden Eagle Awards =

Chinese TV awards ceremony in 2024

- Date: 20 October 2024
- Site: Golden Eagle Film and Television Culture City
- Hosted by: He Jiong; Liu Tao

Highlights
- Best Actor: Fan Wei; The Long Season
- Best Actress: Zhao Liying; Wild Bloom

Television coverage
- Channel: Hunan Television

32nd China TV Golden Eagle Awards
- Simplified Chinese: 第32届中国电视金鹰奖
- Traditional Chinese: 第32屆中國電視金鷹獎
Transcriptions
Standard Mandarin
- Hanyu Pinyin: Dì Sānshīèrjiè Zhōngguó Diànshì Jīnyīngjiǎng

The 32nd China TV Golden Eagle Awards ceremony was held in Changsha, Hunan, China, on 20 October 2024.

== Winners and nominators ==
Best Television Series	Outstanding Television Series
Three-Body; The Forerunner; Blossoms Shanghai; The Knockout; The Long Season; A Dream of Splendor; Meet Yourself; Bright Future; Wild Bloom	The Forerunner; Blossoms Shanghai; Wild Bloom; The Knockout; The Long Season; A Dream of Splendor; Meet Yourself; Bright Future
Best Director	Best Screenwriter
Yang Lei–Three-Body; Wang Wei–The Forerunner; Yang Yang–A Dream of Splendor; Xin Shuang–he Long Season; Shen Yan–The Heart of Genius; Xu Jizhou–The Knockout	Qin Wen–Blossoms Shanghai; Yu Xiaoqian, Pan Yiran, Chen Ji–The Long Season; Wang Xiaoqiang–Bright Future; Zhang Ting, Fu Dongyu–Wild Bloom; Gao Xuan, Ren Baoru–Imperfect Victim; Liang Zhenhua–Welcome to Milele
Best Actor	Best Actress
Fan Wei–The Long Season; Hu Ge–Blossoms Shanghai; Yu Hewei–Three-Body; Li Xian–Meet Yourself; Jin Dong–Welcome to Milele; Zhang Ruoyun–Ordinary Greatness	Zhao Liying–Wild Bloom; Zhou Xun–Imperfect Victim; Li Qin–Miles to Go; Wu Yue–Bright Future; Liu Lin–A Long Way Home; Tiffany Tang–Blossoms Shanghai
Best Supporting Actor	Best Supporting Actress
Wang Jingchun–Ordinary Greatness; Qin Hao–The Long Season; Wang Xiao–Bright Future; Li Naiwen–Always On The Move; Zhang Xincheng–Bright Future; Dong Yong–Blossoms Shanghai	Gao Ye–The Knockout; Wu Yue–Blossoms Shanghai; Ding Liuyuan –The Power Source; Zhang Keying–The Story of Xing Fu; Ada Liu–A Dream of Splendor; Jiang Yan–Always On The Move
Television Documentary	Best TV Variety (Art) Program
Ba Jin; The Yellow River; Mao Zedong; Why China; Hi, Asian Games	Endless Melody: Taiwan; Singing for the Central Axis of Beijing; The "Most Beautiful Night of 2023" Bilibili Evening Party; 2022–2024 Chinese Festival Series Program; 2023 Annual Three Rural Figures Promotion Event Honor Ceremony; Central Radio and Television Station 2023 Mid Autumn Festival Gala; Curator is Arrived in Qinghai; Singing for the Central Axis of Beijing
Best Host	Best TV Animated
He Jiong–Endless Melody: Taiwan; Liu Dongdong–2023 Annual Three Rural Figures Promotion Event Honor Ceremony; Li Jie–Singing for the Central Axis of Beijing; Meng Shengnan–Central Radio and Television Station 2023 Mid Autumn Festival Gala; Lu Jian–Central Radio and Television Station 2023 Mid Autumn Festival Gala; Xie Nan–The "Most Beautiful Night of 2023" Bilibili Evening Party	Boonie Bears; The Dream of Common Prosperity in Xiajiang Village; King of Glory: Chapter of Glory Broken Moon Chapter; Genius Little Luban; Invincible Deer Team; The Ravages of Time; Hello, Braided Girl; The Story of Dunhuang
Lifetime Achievement Award
You Benchang; Zhang Shaolin
