= Yu Hewei =

Chinese actor (born 1971)

- 于和伟
- Born: 4 May 1971 (age 55); Fushun, Liaoning, China
- Education: Shanghai Theatre Academy
- Occupation: Actor
- Years active: 1999–present

Chinese name
- Simplified Chinese: 于和伟
- Traditional Chinese: 于和偉
Transcriptions
Standard Mandarin
- Hanyu Pinyin: Yú Héwěi

Yu Hewei (Chinese: 于和伟; born 4 May 1971) is a Chinese actor of Hui ethnicity, known for his roles as Liu Bei in Three Kingdoms, as Cao Cao in The Advisors Alliance, as Shi Qiang in Three-Body, and as Wu Shi in Silent Honor (2025).

== Biography ==
Yu was born in Fushun, Liaoning, on 4 May 1971. In 1992, he enrolled at Shanghai Theatre Academy, where he majored in acting.

Yu made his television debut in the historical television series Cao Cao, playing Xun Yu.

In 2003, Yu played a supporting role in The Grand Mansion Gate, starring Siqin Gaowa and Chen Baoguo and directed by Guo Baochang.

In 2010, Yu gained national fame for his role as Liu Bei in the historical television series Three Kingdoms, adapted from Luo Guanzhong's classical novel of the same title.

In 2017, Yu played the role of Zheng Zhong in Feng Xiaogang's film I Am Not Madame Bovary, for which he won Best Supporting Actor at the 31st Golden Rooster Awards.

In 2018, for his role as Cao Cao in The Advisors Alliance, Yu was nominated for the Outstanding Actor at the 31st Flying Apsaras Awards, Best Actor at the 29th China TV Golden Eagle Awards, and won the Best Supporting Actor at the 24th Shanghai Television Festival.

In 2021, Yu was nominated for Best Actor at the 34th Golden Rooster Awards for his performance in Cliff Walkers and won Best Actor at the 27th Shanghai Television Festival for his role of Chen Duxiu in The Awakeing Age.

In 2024, Yu appeared in the science fiction television series Three-Body, which earned him a Best Actor at the 32nd China TV Golden Eagle Awards.

== Personal life ==
Yu met Song Linjing in 1991 while he worked at Fushun Drama Troupe. After marriage, the couple has a daughter.

== Filmography ==
=== Film ===
Year	English title	Chinese title	Role	Ref.
1993		血色玫瑰		
2002	Love of Policeman's Wife	铁血柔情	Ah Long	
2008	The New Guard under Neon Lights	霓虹灯下新哨兵	Hao Tiedan	
2015	Mr. Six	老炮儿	Uncle Gong	
2016	Royal Treasure	极限挑战	Yongli Emperor	
2016	The New Year's Eve of Old Lee	过年好	Shen Qiang	
2016	The Whisper	魔都凶音	President Shi	
2016	I Am Not Madame Bovary	我不是潘金莲	Zheng Zhong	
2017	The Founding of an Army	建军大业	Chen Duxiu	
2018	A or B	幕后玩家	President Liu	
2018	How Long Will I Love U	超时空同居	Scientist	
2018	The Island	一出好戏	President Zhang	
2019	Crazy Alien	疯狂的外星人	Brother Liu	
2019	Adoring	宠爱	Gao Ming	
2020	My People, My Homeland	我和我的家乡	Jiang Wei'an	
2021	A Writer's Odyssey	刺杀小说家	Li Mu	
2021	Cliff Walkers	悬崖之上	Zhou Yi	
2023	Under the Light	坚如磐石	Li Zhitian	
2023	World's Greatest Dad	二手杰作	Ma Yinbo	
2024	Article 20	第二十条	Wang Jian	
2024	Upstream	逆行人生	President Wei	
2026	All The Good Eyes	森中有林	Lian Jiahai	
TBA		援军明日到达	Fang Xianjue	

=== Television ===
Year	English title	Chinese title	Role	Notes
2000	Cao Cao	曹操	Xun Yu	
2000	Shenzhen Women	深圳女人	Qiao Meng	
2001	Wolong Xiao Zhuge	卧龙小诸葛	Lu Su	
2002	Provincial Party Secretary	省委书记	Magistrate Luo	
2002		王记大排档	Xi Gua	
2002	Crystal Edge	水晶缘	Su Haidong	
2003	The Principle	原则	Shi Tiancheng	
2003	The Grand Mansion Gate	大宅门2	Bai Zhan'an	
2004		谁可相依	Qian Shuming	
2004		追日	Ichiro Kimura	
2004	Historic Sky	历史的天空	Wan Gubei	
2005	Papa Can You Hear Me Sing?	搭错车	Su Minsheng	
2005		与爱同生	Zhou Guotong	
2006	The Age of True Love	真情时代	Li Heping	
2006	Dutiful Son	孝子	Shen Zhigong	
2006	Close Encounter Of Mahjong	局中局	Zhou Wenying/ Zhao Tianyu	
2007		霓虹灯下的哨兵	Hao Tiedan	
2007	I love Sister Furong	我爱芙蓉姐	Chang Qing	
2008	Days of Glory	光荣岁月	Yu Min	
2008	Huarong Road	华容道	Guo Lin	
2008		敌后武工队	Jia Zheng	
2008	Years	岁月	Wu Guo	
2008	Bottom Line of Man	男人底线	Zhao Tongda	
2008		纸醉金迷	Fan Baohua	
2008		锁春记	Zhuang Shibo	
2008	Beautiful Things	漂亮的事	Jiang Baichuan	
2008	Mask	面具	Chang Siyuan	
2009	War-Time Romance	战地浪漫曲	Deputy Commander Tang	
2010	Three Kingdoms	三国	Liu Bei	
2010		家仇	Zhang Tianxin	
2010	Special War Pioneer	特战先锋	Mao Renfeng	
2010	Happy Memories of Lao Ma's Family	老马家的幸福往事	Mo Wenhui	
2010		兵临城下	Yang Shaocheng	
2010		冰是睡着的水	Zhou Xinyu	
2011	Happiness on the Road	幸福在路上	Ma Gang	
2011	China in 1921	中国1921	Chen Duxiu	
2011		青盲	Zhang Haifeng	
2012	Spy	奸细	Jiang Yiping	
2012	Man of War	男人的战争	Tang Jishan	
2012	Big Family	大家庭	Yuan Gang	
2012		我是特种兵之利刃出鞘	Kang Lei	
2012		连环套	Meng Qingfan	
2012	Dances with Wolves	与狼共舞	Shao Wenguang	
2012	King's War	楚汉传奇	Qin Shi Huang	
2013		天下人家	Tang Zhongqiu	
2013	Prenuptial Agreement	婚前协议	Gao Han	
2013	38 Degrees Below Zero	零下三十八度	Nian Dingbang	
2014	Domino of Love	爱的多米诺	Dai Gushun	
2014	The Next Station	下一站婚姻	Gong Jian	
2015	Police Captain	刑警队长	Gu Ming	
2015		云水怒	Ah Zhong	
2016		追击者	Cao Ruofei	
2016	Police Flower and Police Dog	警花与警犬	Du Fei	
2017		八方传奇	President	
2017	The Advisors Alliance	大军师司马懿之军师联盟	Cao Cao	
2018	Next Time, Together Forever	下一站，别离	Qiu Yang	
2018	The Drug Hunter	猎毒人	Lǖ Yunpeng	
2018	Tomb of the Sea	沙海	Wu Sansheng	
2018		追捕者	Chen Shaofeng	
2018		好戏一出	Zhang Jiqiang	
2019	Investiture of the Gods	封神演义	Jiang Ziya	
2020	Court Of Final Determination	决胜法庭	Gao Jian	
2020	The Justice of the People	巡回检察组	Feng Sen	
2021	Monarch Industry	上阳赋	Wang Lin	
2021	The Age of Awakening	觉醒年代	Chen Duxiu	
2021	Decisive Victory	大决战	Lin Biao	
2021	The Ideal City	理想之城	Zhao Xiankun	
2023	Three-Body	三体	Shi Qiang	
2024	City of the City	城中之城	Zhao Hui	
2024	Northwest Years	西北岁月	Liu Zhidan	
2024	I am a Detective	我是刑警	Qin Chuan	
2025	Silent Honor	沉默的荣耀	Wu Shi	

== Awards and nominations ==
Year	Nominated work	Award	Category	Result	Notes
2009	Zhi Zui Jin Mi	15th Shanghai Television Festival	Best Actor	Nominated	
2015	The Next Station	17th Huading Awards	Best Actor (Contemporary Drama)	Won	
2017	I Am Not Madame Bovary	31st Golden Rooster Awards	Best Supporting Actor	Won	
2018	Police Captain/ The Advisors Alliance	31st Flying Apsaras Awards	Outstanding Actor	Nominated	
2018	The Advisors Alliance	24th Shanghai Television Festival	Best Supporting Actor	Won	
2018	The Advisors Alliance	29th China TV Golden Eagle Awards	Best Actor	Nominated	
2019		17th Golden Phoenix Awards	Academy Award	Won	
2021	Cliff Walkers	34th Golden Rooster Awards	Best Actor	Nominated	
2021	The Awakeing Age	27th Shanghai Television Festival	Best Actor	Won	
2022	The Awakeing Age	33rd Shanghai Television Festival	Best Actor	Nominated	
2022	The Awakeing Age	31st China TV Golden Eagle Awards	Best Actor	Nominated	
2024	Three-Body	2nd China TV Drama Annual Ceremony	Actor of the Year	Nominated	
2024	Three-Body	32nd China TV Golden Eagle Awards	Best Actor	Nominated	
2024	Three-Body	20th China US Television Festival	Best Actor	Won	
2024	Cliff Walkers	13th China Film Directors' Guild	2021 Actor of the Year	Nominated	
2024	City of the City	15th Macau International Television Festival	Best Supporting Actor	Nominated	
