= My Uncle Zhou Enlai =

- Traditional Chinese: 海棠依旧
- Simplified Chinese: 海棠依旧
- Hanyu Pinyin: Hǎitáng Yījiù
- Genre: Historical, biographical
- Based on: My Uncle Zhou Enlai by Zhou Bingde
- Written by: Zhang Fachun
- Directed by: Chen Li
- Starring: Sun Weimin; Huang Wei
- Country of origin: China
- Original language: Mandarin
- No. of seasons: 1
- No. of episodes: 41

Production
- Executive producers: Qin Zhengui; Zhang Fachun; Hong Tao; Bai Jingjun; Shang Shuzhong
- Production locations: Rongguo House Film and Television Base, Zhengding County, Hebei
- Production companies: Hebei Film Studio; CCTV; August First Film Studio; Beijing Jinxuan Cultural Exchange Company

Original release
- Network: CCTV-1; CCTV-3; Hebei Television
- Release: July 4 – July 25, 2016

My Uncle Zhou Enlai (Chinese: 海棠依旧) is a 2016 Chinese historical biographical television series directed by Chen Li and written by Zhang Fachun, starring Sun Weimin as the Chinese premier Zhou Enlai. The series also features Huang Wei, Tang Guoqiang, Ma Xiaowei, Lu Qi, Wang Wufu, Yang Buting and Zhao Liqiang. The script was loosely based on Zhou Enlai's niece Zhou Bingde's biography of the same name, and covers Zhou's life from the establishment of the Communist State to his death in 1976, focusing on his efforts to make the new China strong. The series was aired on CCTV-1 on July 4, 2016.

== Synopsis ==
This drama describes the life of Zhou Enlai, who serves as Premier of the People's Republic of China, from the founding of the Communist State in 1949 to 1976 until his death.

== Cast ==
- Sun Weimin as Zhou Enlai
  - Hou Xianglin as young Zhou Enlai
- Huang Wei as Deng Yingchao

=== Communist Party ===
- Tang Guoqiang as Mao Zedong
- Lu Qi as Deng Xiaoping
- Wang Wufu as Zhu De
- Yang Buting as Liu Shaoqi
- Zhao Liqiang as Xi Zhongxun
- Li Shixi as Ye Jianying
- Wu Haiyan as Song Qingling
- Yao Bingyou as Shao Zili
- Zhang Yang as Tong Xiaopeng
- Shi Lin as Liao Mengxing
- Ding Jun as Luo Ruiqing
- Zhang Jianguo as Feng Jiping
- Cui Genshuan as Chen Yi
- Niu Ben as Shen Junru
- Ding Liuyuan as Sun Weishi
- Zhao Xiaochuan as Chen Yun
- Chen Rui as Nie Rongzhen
- Zhu Xinyun as Li Kenong
- Wang Guodong as Li Hu
- Wang Jian as Ren Bishi
- Shao Xiaowei as Chen Zongying
- Wang Bozhao as Zhou Enshou
- Hao Yan as Wang Shiqin
- Ding Yongdai as Geng Biao
- Guo Dongwen as Huang Zhen
- Zhang Xicai as Zhang Shizhao
- Lin Yujia as Sun Xinshi
- Lu Chang'en as Peng Dehuai
- Wan Siwei as Mao Anying
- Chu Xingyi as Luo Qingchang
- Lyu Yiding as Liao Chengzhi
- Zheng Qiang as Huang Hua
- Zeng Yixuan as Zhou Bingde
- Zhou Xuqi as Li Xiannian
- Lyu Yi as Zeng Shan
- Ma Chongyue as Chen Guodong
- Kang Fulin as Zhou Bingjian
- Fu Fangjun as Zhou Binghe
- Quan Yicheng as Zhou Bingjun
- Wu Hao as Zhou Binghua
- Jiang Wenwen as Zhou Bingyi
- Song Xiaoying as Cai Chang
- Zheng Yu as Wu Jieping
- Yuan Xia as He Xiangning
- Cheng Guodong as Lin Boqu
- Wang Shuqin as Kang Keqing
- Xue Shujie as Zhuo Lin
- Liu Hanqin as Ji Pengfei
- Yang Tong as Zhuang Zedong

=== Kuomintang ===
- Ma Xiaowei as Chiang Kai-shek
- Su Li as Soong May-ling
- Lin Jinfeng as Chiang Ching-kuo
- Yue Xiaobing as Zhang Qun
- Guo Tiecheng as Mao Renfeng
- Ding Zijian as Zhou Zhirou
- Zhao Xiaoming as Duan Yunpeng
- Zhang Fan as Ye Xiangzhi

=== Foreigners ===
- Liu Ziqiang as Yamaguchi Ryuichi
- Wang Zhenli as Bung Sukarno
- Tian Jingshan as Ho Chi Minh
- Wang Guangzhi as Norodom Sihanouk

== Production ==
My Uncle Zhou Enlai is based on the biography of the same name by Zhou Bingde, Zhou Enlai's nephew.

Chen Li was asked to direct the series. Before accepting this series, she has directed the film Zhou Enlai's Four Days and Nights.

In the autumn of 2010, Zhang Fachun signed on to write the script for the series. Zhang has said he had spent three years developing the series.

Sun Weimin is known for typecasting Zhou Enlai, he cast in lead role Zhou Enlai.

Most of the television series was shot on location in Rongguo House Film and Television Base, Zhengding County, north China's Hebei province.

== Broadcast ==
My Uncle Zhou Enlai was broadcast on CCTV-1, CCTV-3 and Hebei Television in the summer of 2016.

The series received mainly positive reviews. On August 28, 2016, admiral Luo Yuan said in Wuhan, Hubei: "The series shows Premier Zhou Enlai's public servant spirit." Li Zhun, a Mao Dun Literary Prize laureate, said: "The series has made new explorations and new creation in the way of narration of historical themes. It integrates state and family affairs into one."

== Accolades ==
| Date | Award | Category | Recipient(s) and nominee(s) | Result | Notes |
|---|---|---|---|---|---|
| 2017 | 23rd Shanghai Television Festival | Best Television Series | My Uncle Zhou Enlai | Nominated | |
| 2017 | 23rd Shanghai Television Festival | Committee Special Award | My Uncle Zhou Enlai | Won | |
| 2017 | 14th Spiritual Civilization | "Five Ones" Project Award | My Uncle Zhou Enlai | Won | |
| 2017 | Chinese American Film Festival | Golden Angel Award | My Uncle Zhou Enlai | Won | |
| 2018 | 31st Flying Apsaras Awards | Outstanding Director | Chen Li | Won | |
| 2018 | 31st Flying Apsaras Awards | Outstanding Actor | Sun Weimin | Nominated | |
| 2018 | 31st Flying Apsaras Awards | Outstanding Television Series Based on Significant Events | My Uncle Zhou Enlai | Nominated | |
| 2018 | 29th China TV Golden Eagle Awards | Best Television Series | My Uncle Zhou Enlai | Won | |
| 2018 | 29th China TV Golden Eagle Awards | Best Director | Chen Li | Won | |
| 2018 | 29th China TV Golden Eagle Awards | Best Actor | Sun Weimin | Nominated | |
