= 26th Golden Eagle Awards =

Chinese TV awards ceremony in 2012

The 26th Golden Eagle Awards (simplified Chinese: 第26届中国电视金鹰奖; traditional Chinese: 第26屆中國電視金鷹獎) were held in Changsha, Hunan, China between September 7 and September 9, 2012.

== Winners ==
Best Television Series	Best Director
China 1921	Yan Jiangang–China's Land; Liu Jiang–Promise of this Life; Liu Jin–Cliff / The Brink
Favorite Actor	Favorite Actress
Wu Xiubo–Before Dawn; Wen Zhang–Snow Leopard; Lin Yongjian–My name is Wang Tudi; Mickey He–Palace II	Song Jia–Cliff / The Brink; Chen Shu–Iron Pear; Ma Su–A Woman as Beautiful as a Flower; Yue Hong–Raise Head and See Bliss
Best Cinematography	Best Art Direction
Sun Yeping–Xinhai Revolution; Qian Tao–China's Land	Yang Zhaohui–Madam Shexiang
Writing	Most Popular Actor(s)
Wang Zhaozhu–Xinhai Revolution	Wen Zhang; Yang Mi
Outstanding Television Series	Best Performing Art
A Woman as Beautiful as a Flower; China's Land; Legend of Shaolin Kungfu III : Heroes of the Great Desert; In Your Prime; The East; Man from the North; An Ancient Village and the Women; Forever Designation; The Loop; 1911 Revolution; The Eagle That is Flying Away; Running into Good Luck; Madam Shexiang; Cliff / The Brink; Broken Thorn; Snow Leopard; Empresses in the Palace; Promise of this Life; Before Dawn; Miss Jiang	Wu Xiubo–Before Dawn; Song Jia–Cliff / The Brink
