= 29th China TV Golden Eagle Awards =

Chinese TV awards ceremony in 2018

- Date: 14 October 2018
- Site: Hunan International Conference & Exhibition Center
- Hosted by: He Jiong; Qin Hailu

Television coverage
- Channel: Hunan Television

29th China TV Golden Eagle Awards
- Simplified Chinese: 第29届中国电视金鹰奖
- Traditional Chinese: 第29屆中國電視金鷹獎
Transcriptions
Standard Mandarin
- Hanyu Pinyin: Dì èrshījiǔ jiè Zhōngguó Diànshì Jīnyīngjiǎng

The 29th China TV Golden Eagle Awards ceremony was held at Hunan International Conference & Exhibition Center in Changsha, Hunan, China, on 14 October 2018.

== Winners and nominators ==
Best Television Series	Lifetime Achievement Award
My Uncle Zhou Enlai; White Deer Plain; Feather Flies To The Sky; Heroes of Defense; Change the World; Love in a Courtyard; The Grainfield; Original Inspiration; Pretty Li Huizhen; The Colors of Ardent; Shall I Compare You to a Spring Day; In the Spring	Li Zhun; Wang Chaozhu
Best Director	Best Screenwriter
Chen Li–My Uncle Zhou Enlai; Yu Ding–Feather Flies to the Sky; Liu Jin–White Deer Plain; Kan Weiping–The Grainfield	Shen Jie–Feather Flies to the Sky; Su Xiaowan–Nothing Gold Can Stay; Qian Linsen–Heroes of Defense; Qin Wen–The First Half of My Life
Audiences' Choice for Most Popular Actor	Audiences' Choice for Most Popular Actress
Li Yifeng–Sparrow; Yu Hewei; Zhang Yi	Dilraba Dilmurat–Pretty Li Huizhen; Yang Zi; Kan Qingzi
Audiences' Choice for Actors	Audiences' Choice for Actresses
Li Yifeng–Sparrow; Zhang Yi–Feather Flies To The Sky; Yu Hewei–The Advisors Alliance; Sun Weimin–My Uncle Zhou Enlai; He Bing–Love in a Courtyard; Zhang Jiayi–White Deer Plain; Liu Yunlong– The Kite; Hou Xiangling–Eastern Battlefield	Ding Liuyuan–Original Inspiration; Dilraba Dilmurat–Pretty Li Huizhen; Liu Tao–The Advisors Alliance/ Ode to Joy; Sun Li–Nothing Gold Can Stay; Yang Zi–Ode to Joy; Yuan Quan–The First Half of My Life; Yin Tao–Feather Flies To The Sky; Kan Qingzi–Sparrow
Best Cinematography	Best Art Direction
Zhi Lei–Nothing Gold Can Stay; Huang Wei–White Deer Plain; Zhang Wenjie–The Advisors Alliance; Huang Shan–My Uncle Zhou Enlai	Wang Shaolin–Full House; Zhang Bin–Nothing Gold Can Stay; Zhang Peng–Heroes of Defense; Liu Lu–White Deer Plain
