= Zeng Yixuan =

Chinese actress (born 1992)

- 曾一萱
- Born: 20 April 1992 (age 34); Hubei, China
- Education: Beijing Film Academy
- Occupation: Actress
- Years active: 2013–present

Zeng Yixuan (Chinese: 曾一萱; pinyin: Zēng Yīxuān, born 20 April 1992) is a Chinese actress. She became widely known for playing A'ruo, a maid who betrays her mistress, in the palace drama Ruyi's Royal Love in the Palace (2018). Her later television work includes Monarch Industry, Demi-Gods and Semi-Devils and Luoyang, all from 2021, and she appeared in the Hong Kong film Where the Wind Blows (2023).

== Early life and education ==
Zeng was born on 20 April 1992 in Hubei. She is of Miao ethnicity. In 2009, she entered the undergraduate acting programme at the Beijing Film Academy, in the same class as the actresses Li Chun and Wu Jinyan. She began acting in films while still a student.

== Career ==
=== 2013–2017: Early roles ===
Zeng first drew attention in 2013 for her role as Yaogu in the art film Tianjiangchang. She began taking television roles in 2014. Her early television credits included leading roles in the urban drama Eighty-Eight Tenants, directed by Yang Xiaobo, and the Republican-era drama The Wolf of a Hundred Battles, as well as a part in the war drama The Last Warrior. In the Qing-dynasty drama The Legend of Da Yu'er, which premiered in November 2015, she played Lüzhu, a martial artist whose family was killed in a massacre ordered by Hong Taiji and who seeks revenge. The role, opposite Geng Le, was her first as a sword-wielding heroine and involved many action scenes.

Zeng played Zhou Enlai's niece Zhou Bingde in My Uncle Zhou Enlai, a drama adapted from Zhou Bingde's memoir My Uncle Zhou Enlai, which premiered on CCTV-1 on 4 July 2016. In 2017, she played Cai Xuedan, a general's daughter who works as a journalist but has a hidden second identity, in the anti-Japanese war drama Feige's Squad, which aired in prime time on CCTV-8. She said that switching between the character's two sides had been mentally demanding.

=== 2018–present ===
In 2018, Zeng played A'ruo in Ruyi's Royal Love in the Palace, starring Zhou Xun and Wallace Huo. A'ruo, a proud and sharp-tongued maid from an official's family, enters the palace as part of the heroine's dowry and later betrays her mistress to become an imperial concubine. Viewers widely disliked the character, and Zeng said she had expected to be criticised for the role and described A'ruo as a character to be loved, hated and pitied. She also said that working closely with Zhou Xun had helped her improve as an actress. That summer, the media noted that Zeng, her co-star Li Chun and Wu Jinyan, the lead of the rival palace drama Story of Yanxi Palace, had been classmates at the Beijing Film Academy.

In 2020, Zeng appeared in Imperfect Her, a drama starring Zhou Xun, Huang Jue, Kara Wai and Angie Chiu. In 2021, she played Wang Qian, the heroine's cousin, who schemes against the heroine's husband and is later married off to a distant land, in Monarch Industry, starring Zhang Ziyi, which aired on Youku. That year, she was part of the main cast of Demi-Gods and Semi-Devils, an adaptation of the Jin Yong novel directed by Yu Rongguang, which premiered on CCTV-8 and Tencent Video on 14 August. In May 2021, she was announced as the Envoy of Autumn in Luoyang, starring Huang Xuan, Wang Yibo and Song Qian, and the series premiered on iQIYI on 1 December 2021.

In 2022, Zeng was part of the main cast of Jade Face and Peach Blossoms, an adaptation of a web novel by Lan Aicao, directed by Mao Kunyu and starring Zhang Hanyun and Tong Mengshi, which premiered on Hunan Television on 1 April. She also appeared in the wuxia drama Heroes, starring Joseph Zeng and Yang Chaoyue, which premiered on Tencent Video on 23 May 2022. In 2023, she appeared as the mistress of Aaron Kwok's character in Philip Yung's crime film Where the Wind Blows, which was released in mainland China on 5 February.

In 2024, Zeng played Huan Lang in The Story of Pearl Girl, starring Zhao Lusi and Liu Yuning, which premiered on Youku on 1 November. In 2025, she played Li Xibei in The Second Half of My Life, a family comedy starring Zhang Guoli, which premiered on CCTV-8 on 30 March. In January 2026, she made a guest appearance as Shen Xing in The Night Is Deep, starring Jiang Shuying and Tong Dawei, which premiered on Tencent Video on 28 January. In October 2026, she played Kong Yingshu in The Golden Hairpin, which premiered on CCTV-8 and Youku on 16 October and was released worldwide on Netflix. She has also been cast as Zhai Weiwei in the series Life at This Moment.

== Filmography ==
=== Films ===
Year	English title	Chinese title	Role	Ref.
2013	Tianjiangchang	天将场	Yaogu	
2023	Where the Wind Blows	风再起时		

=== Television series ===
Year	English title	Chinese title	Role	Notes	Ref.
2014	Eighty-Eight Tenants	八十八家房客		Lead role	
2015	The Legend of Da Yu'er	大玉儿传奇	Lüzhu		
2016	My Uncle Zhou Enlai	海棠依旧	Zhou Bingde		
2017	Feige's Squad	飞哥战队	Cai Xuedan		
2018	Ruyi's Royal Love in the Palace	如懿传	A'ruo		
2020	Imperfect Her	不完美的她			
2021	Monarch Industry	上阳赋	Wang Qian		
2021	Demi-Gods and Semi-Devils	天龙八部			
2021	Luoyang	风起洛阳	Envoy of Autumn		
2022	Jade Face and Peach Blossoms	玉面桃花总相逢			
2022	Heroes	说英雄谁是英雄			
2024	The Story of Pearl Girl	珠帘玉幕	Huan Lang		
2025	The Second Half of My Life	我的后半生	Li Xibei		
2026	The Night Is Deep	夜色正浓	Shen Xing	Guest appearance	
2026	The Golden Hairpin	嫁金钗	Kong Yingshu		
2026	Where the Mask Ends	Kong Yingshu			
TBA	Life at This Moment	此刻的生活	Zhai Weiwei		
