= Beijing No. 5 High School =

Public secondary school in Dongcheng, Beijing, China

Coordinates: 39°56′11″N 116°24′29″E

- 北京市第五中学
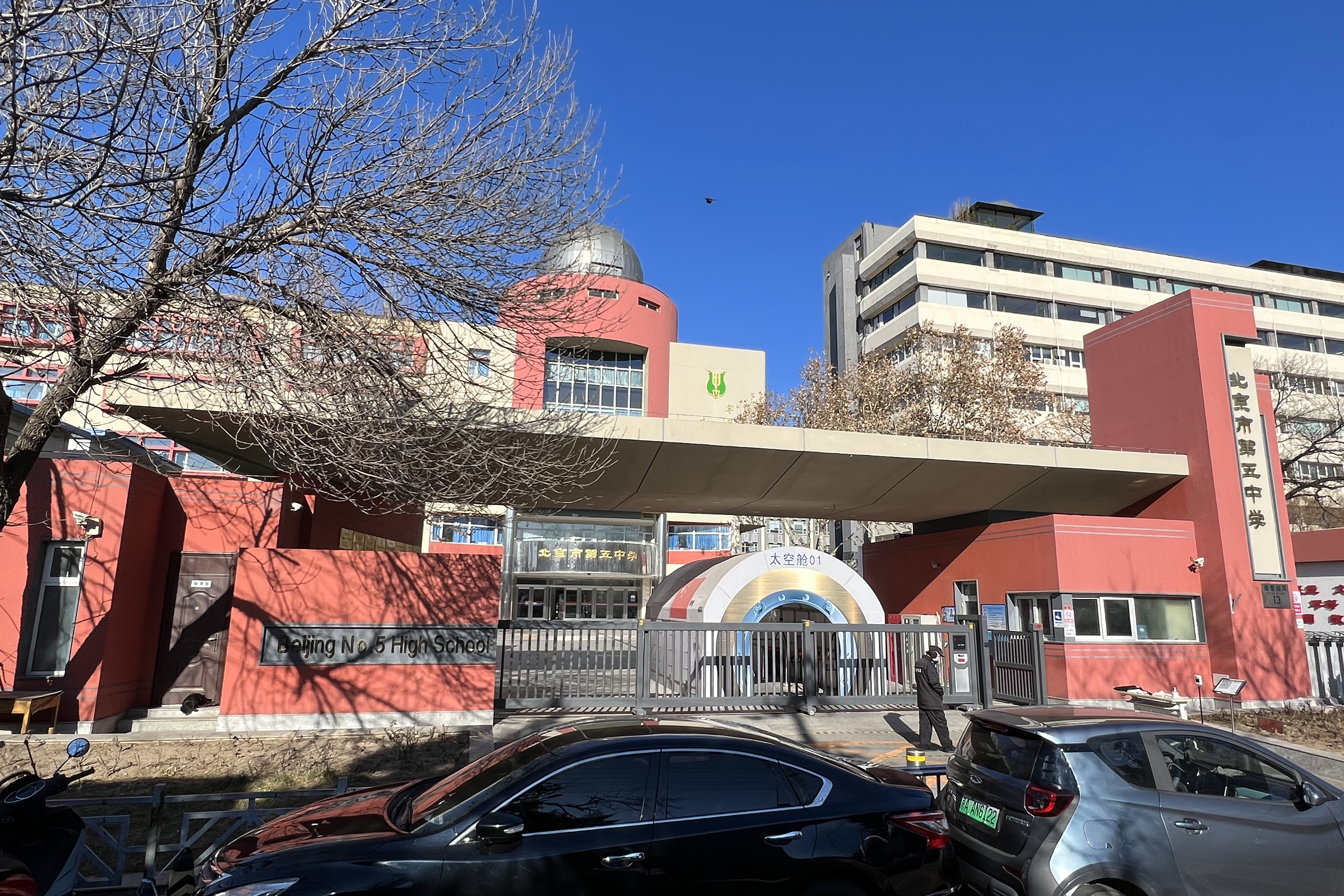

Information
- School type: Secondary school

Beijing No. 5 High School is a public secondary school in Dongcheng, Beijing, China. The school is supervised by the Beijing City Dongcheng District Education Committee.

== Famous Alumni ==
- Chökyi Gyalpo
- Huang Wei
