= Zhou Bingde =

Chinese journalist and politician (born 1937)

- 周秉德
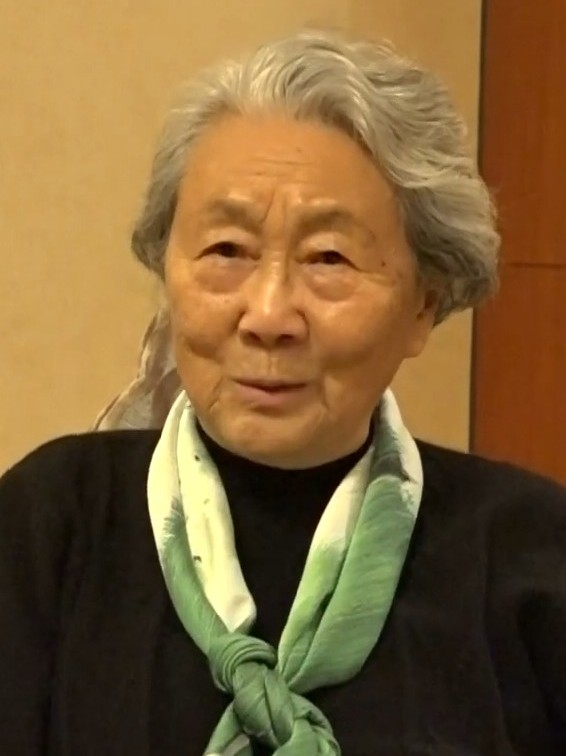
- Zhou in 2023

Member of the Ninth and Tenth National Committees of the Chinese People's Political Consultative Conference
- In office 1999–2008

Personal details
- Born: 1937 (age 88–89) Harbin, Binjiang Province, Manchukuo (now in Heilongjiang, China)
- Party: Chinese Communist Party
- Spouse: Shen Renhua (m. 1964)
- Relations: Zhou Enlai (uncle); Deng Yingchao (aunt)
- Children: 2 sons
- Education: Experimental High School Attached to Beijing Normal University
- Occupation: Writer, journalist, politician

Zhou Bingde
- Chinese: 周秉德
Transcriptions
Standard Mandarin
- Hanyu Pinyin: Zhōu Bǐngdé
- Wade–Giles: Chou1 Ping4-te2

Zhou Bingde (Chinese: 周秉德; pinyin: Zhōu Bǐngdé; born April 1937) is a Chinese journalist, politician and writer who served as the deputy director of the China News Service and was a member of the Ninth and Tenth National Committees of the Chinese People's Political Consultative Conference (CPPCC). She is the niece of Zhou Enlai, the first premier of the People's Republic of China.

== Early life ==
Zhou Bingde was born in 1937 in Harbin under the Japanese puppet state of Manchukuo. She is the eldest of seven children born to Zhou Enshou, the younger brother of Zhou Enlai, and his wife Wang Shiqin, who was of Manchu descent. Her name, inspired by Qu Yuan's poem Ode to the Orange, was chosen by a family friend, reflecting the phrase "Bingde Wusi" (秉德无私), meaning "upholding virtue impartially". In 1943, amid the Japanese occupation of Northeast China, her family relocated to Tianjin, where she completed her primary education.

In June 1949, she moved with her parents to Beijing, residing with her uncle Zhou Enlai and his wife, Deng Yingchao, in Zhongnanhai. There, she enrolled in the Beijing Normal University Affiliated High School for Girls (now Beijing Normal University Experimental High School). During her time in Zhongnanhai, she befriended Li Min and Li Na, daughters of Mao Zedong.

== Career ==
In 1950, when the Korean War broke out, Zhou Bingde actively participated in her school's amateur theater troupe. She performed in multiple propaganda activities to support the Chinese intervention into the war by conducting performances at her school, in rural areas, and in public spaces to raise awareness and support for the war effort.

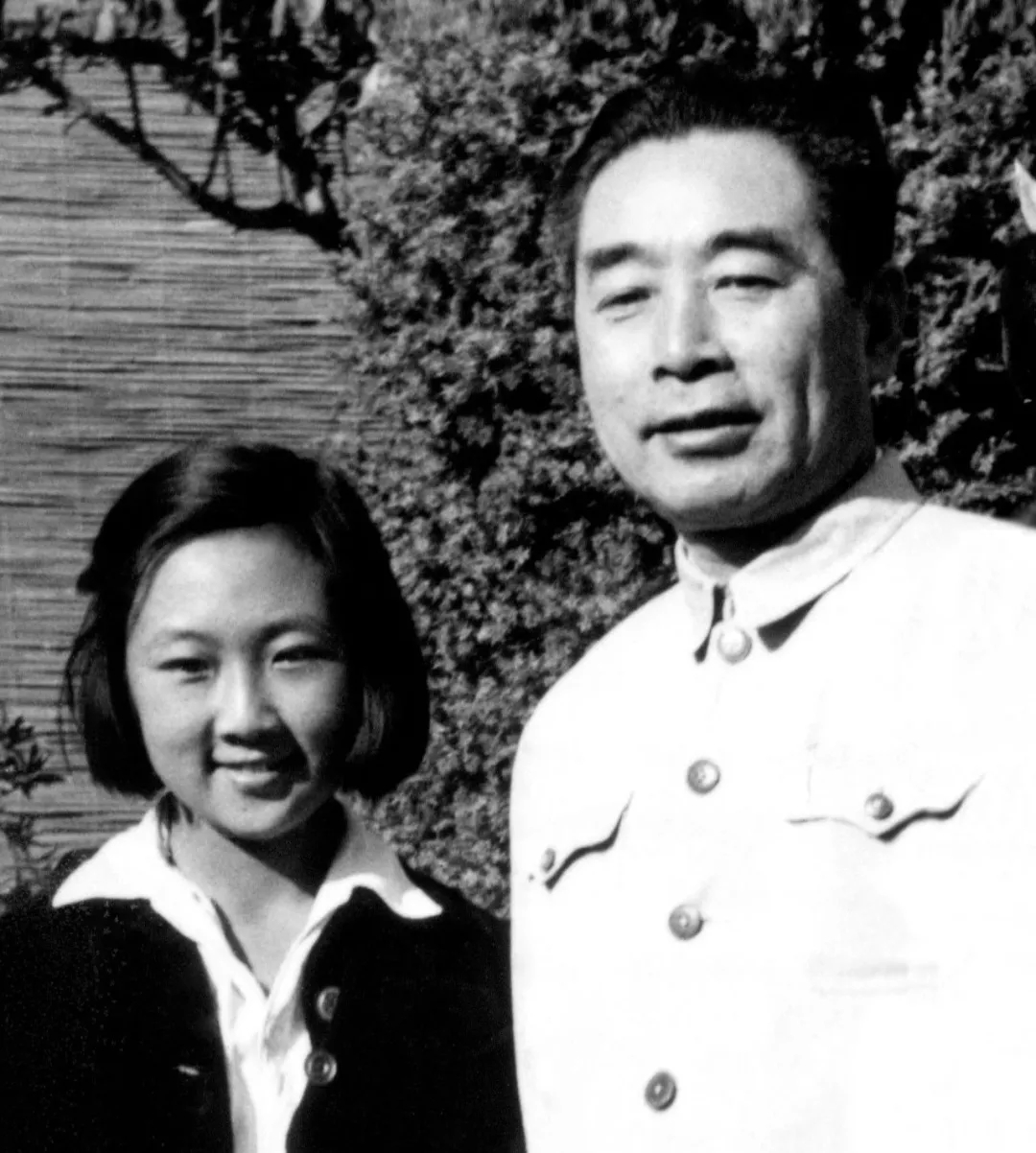
Zhou with her uncle Zhou Enlai

In 1952, inspired by the 1947 Soviet film The Village Teacher, Zhou Bingde decided to pursue a career in education. After graduating from Beijing Normal School in 1955, she joined the Chinese Communist Party and began working as a fourth-grade teacher in Beijing's Chaoyang District, teaching Chinese and mathematics. Later that year, she was reassigned to the district committee to participate in the Campaign to Suppress Counterrevolutionaries. From 1957, she took part in various political campaigns, including the Anti-Rightist Campaign and the Socialist Education Movement in the early 1960s, while also contributing to the construction of the Miyun Reservoir in Beijing. In October 1961, she worked as a clerk in the propaganda department of the Chaoyang District Committee and later participated in the Socialist Education Movement in Jinzhan Commune, Chaoyang District.

In 1965, she moved with her husband to Xi'an, where she worked in the cadre section of the Light Industry Bureau. Following the start of the Cultural Revolution, she became a target of political persecution. Although she was the niece of Premier Zhou Enlai, she deliberately chose not to reveal her familial connection, believing it was inappropriate to use family ties for personal protection or advantage. In 1968, her father Zhou Enshou was accused of involvement in a "counter-revolutionary organization" and was imprisoned for seven years after the case was reported to Jiang Qing, who forwarded it to Zhou Enlai who then approved the arrest of his own brother. She withheld her family connection as political pressure intensified. In 1970, Zhou and her husband were relocated to a military factory in Zunyi, Guizhou, where she worked in the political department. Returning to Beijing in 1973, she held positions at the Beijing Jewelry Import and Export Company, the Beijing Foreign Trade Bureau, and the Beijing International Trust and Investment Company. In 1988, she became Vice President of Voice of China newspaper. In 1994, she was appointed Vice President of the China News Service, overseeing party affairs, finance, administration, and technical departments of the news agency until her retirement in 1998.

From 1999 to 2008, she served as the member of the Cultural and Historical Materials Committee of the 9th and 10th National Committees of the Chinese People's Political Consultative Conference.

== Later life ==
In 2010, she visited Taiwan as part of a meeting of the descendants of Whampoa Military Academy alumni. She also served as an executive director of the China Council for the Promotion of Peaceful National Reunification, an organization to promote unification between mainland China and Taiwan on terms defined solely by the People's Republic of China. In a 2014 interview with the South China Morning Post, she supported the anti-corruption campaign under Xi Jinping, stating "The vested-interest groups he (Xi Jinping) has targeted are, of course, not happy, and they will put up resistance. But common people hope he can be persistent." In 2016, Zhou Bingde founded the Beijing Daluan Xiangyu Charity Foundation to promote the legacy of Zhou Enlai and other Chinese revolutionaries through education, cultural exchange, and charitable activities. In the same year, a historical biographical television series based on her autobiography My Uncle Zhou Enlai was released.

In 2018, she visited the United Nations Headquarters in New York where she announced the publication of the first English translation of her autobiography My Uncle Zhou Enlai. As of 2025, she is a consultant to the Zhou Enlai and Deng Yingchao Research Center in Tianjin.

== Personal life ==
In 1963, Zhou met Shen Renhua, a captain in the People's Liberation Army Air Force and the grandson of politician Shen Junru. The couple married on National Day 1964 and have two sons.

== Works ==
- Annotations on Zhou Enlai's Poems and Couplets (Chinese: 周恩来诗联集笺注; pinyin: Zhōu'ēnlái shī lián jí jiānzhù). Jiangsu Literature and Art Publishing House (1998)
- My Uncle Zhou Enlai (Chinese: 我的伯父周恩来; pinyin: Wǒ de bófù zhōu'ēnlái). Liaoning People's Publishing House (2000)
- Family Love in Xihua Hall: Uncles and Aunts in Our Hearts (Chinese: 亲情西花厅：我们心中的伯父伯母; pinyin: Qīnqíng xī huātīng: Wǒmen xīnzhōng de bófù bómǔ). Hongqi Publishing House (2008)
- My Uncle and Aunt Zhou Enlai and Deng Yingchao (Chinese: 我的伯父伯母周恩来邓颖超; pinyin: Wǒ de bófù bómǔ zhōu'ēnlái dèngyǐngchāo). Jincheng Publishing House (2018)
