= Hu Qiuyuan =

- 胡秋原
- Born: Hu Yechong (胡業崇); Hu Zengyou (胡曾佑); June 11, 1910; Huangpi County, Hubei
- Died: May 24, 2004 (aged 93); Taipei County, Taiwan
- Education: National Wuchang University; Fudan University; Waseda University
- Occupations: Author, educator, politician
- Spouse: Jing Youru
- Children: 5
- Writing career
- Pen name: Weiming (未名); Shiming (石明); Bingchan (冰禪)
- Language: Chinese, English, Japanese
- Period: 1962-1980
- Genre: Essay
- Notable works: Ancient Chinese Culture and the Chinese Intellectuals; The History of Chinese Ideologies; The Biography of Chinese Heroes

Hu Qiuyuan (Chinese: 胡秋原; pinyin: Hū Qiūyuán; 11 June 1910 - 24 May 2004) was a Chinese author, educator and politician from Taiwan.

== Biography ==
Hu was born in June 1910 in Huangpi County, Hubei.

At the age of 15, he entered National Wuchang University (國立武昌大學). He was a member of the Chinese Communist Youth League, but had left in 1924 for the Kuomintang.

In 1928, Hu was accepted to Fudan University, where he majored in Chinese literature.

Hu went to Japan in 1929, he studied political economy at Waseda University. He returned to Shanghai in 1931.

Hu went to Hong Kong in November 1933, but he was arrested and expelled by the British Hong Kong Government.

From 1934 to 1936, Hu visited India, Egypt, the United Kingdom, the Soviet Union, and the United States.

Hu returned to China in 1937, he founded the Times Daily (《時代日報》) in Hankou, then he joined the Kuomintang.

Hu was elected to the Senate in 1940 in Chongqing. The next year, he rejoined the Kuomintang.

After the Second Sino-Japanese War, Hu was elected legislator. At the same time, he taught at Jinan University and Fudan University.

In 1949, Hu went to Hong Kong, then he settled in Taiwan in 1951. He taught at National Taiwan Normal University, Shih Hsin University, and Fu Hsing Kang College.

In 1962, Hu caught in a war of works with Li Ao and Ju Haoran.

In 1970, Hu waged a paper-warfare against Yu Guangzhong.

On 11 September 1988, Hu visited mainland China. He discussed unification with Deng Yingchao, and on 21 September, was expelled from the Kuomintang. He returned to Taiwan on 18 October, and his trip was discussed in a parliamentary session on 28 October, resulting in the first walkout of government officials in the history of the Republic of China.

Hu served as the Honorary President of Peaceful Reunification of China Alliance (中國統一聯盟).

On 24 May 2004, Hu died of illness at Gengshen Hospital (耕莘醫院), in Xindian, Taipei County, aged 95.

== Works ==
- Ancient Chinese Culture and the Chinese Intellectuals (古代中國文化與中國知識分子)
- The History of Chinese Ideologies (一百三十年來中國思想史綱)
- The Biography of Chinese Heroes (中國英雄傳)
- The History of Russia Military Aggression (俄帝侵華史綱)
- The Speeches of Hu Qiuyuan (胡秋原演講集)
- In the Same Boat (同舟共濟)

== Personal life ==
Hu married Jing Youru (敬幼如); he had daughters Hu Caihe (胡采禾), Hu Shushi (胡蜀石), Hu Shushan (胡蜀山), a son Hu Bukai (胡卜凯), and the youngest daughter Hu Puxuan (胡卜旋).
