= Zhou Enshou =

Chinese revolutionary and politician (1904–1985)

- 周恩寿
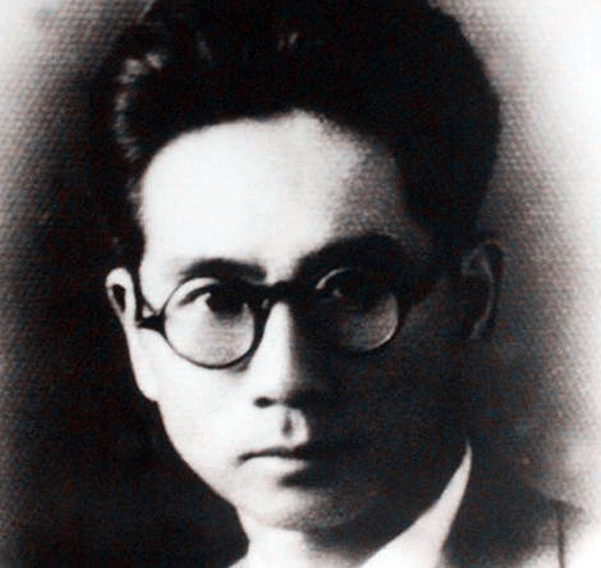

Member of the Fifth and Sixth National Committees of the Chinese People's Political Consultative Conference
- In office 1980–1985

Personal details
- Born: 1904 Huai'an, Jiangsu, Qing China
- Died: 10 May 1985 (aged 80–81) Beijing, China
- Party: Chinese Communist Party
- Spouse: Wang Shiqin (m. 1936–1985)
- Relations: Zhou Enlai (brother)
- Children: 7
- Education: Nankai Middle School; Whampoa Military Academy
- Occupation: Politician, Revolutionary

Zhou Enshou
- Simplified Chinese: 周恩寿
- Traditional Chinese: 周恩壽
Transcriptions
Standard Mandarin
- Hanyu Pinyin: Zhōu Ēnshòu
- Wade–Giles: Chou1 En1-shou4

Zhou Enshou (simplified Chinese: 周恩寿; traditional Chinese: 周恩壽; pinyin: Zhōu Ēnshòu; 1904 – 13 May 1985), also known by his courtesy name Tongyu (Chinese: 同宇; pinyin: Tóngyǔ), was a Chinese revolutionary and politician. He was the younger brother of Zhou Enlai, the first premier of the People's Republic of China.

== Early life ==
Zhou was born in 1904 in Huai'an, Jiangsu, to Zhou Yineng and a mother with surname Wan. He later moved to Tianjin in 1918 to pursue education, where he was raised by his fourth uncle. In 1921, he enrolled at Nankai Middle School in Tianjin and in 1924, he joined the Chinese Communist Party (CCP). In October 1925, he entered the Whampoa Military Academy and later transferred to the academy's political department.

== Political and revolutionary activities ==
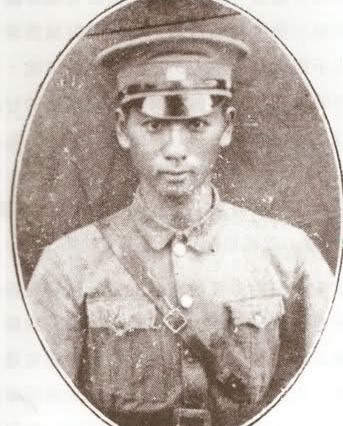
Zhou as cadet at Whampoa Military Academy

In 1926, Zhou participated in the Northern Expedition, serving as a squad leader in the propaganda team of the National Revolutionary Army's General Political Department and as a representative of the Labor-Capital Arbitration Committee. In the spring of 1927, he was appointed director of the Wuhan Post and Telecommunications Inspection Committee. In early 1928, Zhou parted ways with his elder brother Zhou Enlai in Shanghai and went to Jilin, adopting the alias "Tongyu" and outwardly distancing himself from the CCP. Subsequently, Zhou worked in Jilin, Shanxi and Tianjin in roles related to taxation, anti-narcotics and securities. While residing in Manchukuo, he held positions such as clerk at the Harbin Taxation Bureau, section chief at the Songjiang Suihua Taxation Bureau, section chief at the Harbin Tax Supervision Office and section chief at the Harbin Binjiang Taxation Bureau. Under Zhou Enlai's arrangements, he moved to Tianjin in 1943 where he engaged in espionage activities by operating a fabric store as a front to provide the CCP with funds and medical resources.

In July 1947, Zhou's identity was exposed, and he was arrested by the Nationalist Government's Tianjin Garrison Command Investigation Office. During his imprisonment, he admitted only to being Zhou Enlai's brother and concealed all traces of his work for the CCP. In December 1947, he was released on bail. He remained in Tianjin with his family where he worked to support his family on a minimal salary.

In April 1949, he reunited with Zhou Enlai in Beijing and enrolled in the North China Revolutionary University. Before the end of the year, he worked at the Ministry of Internal Affairs and, to avoid nepotism, Zhou Enlai urged the ministry to ensure that Zhou Enshou worked in the lowest position with the lowest salary, and supplemented his income to ensure that he would be able to maintain his family. After graduating in 1950, he was assigned as a section chief at the Beijing Iron and Steel Industry Bureau. He later served as an inspector at the Ministry of Metallurgy, deputy manager of the engineering department at the North China Iron and Steel Industry Bureau, secretary at the supply and sales department of the Heavy Industry Ministry's Iron and Steel General Bureau, deputy director of the purchasing and transportation station, and head of the warehouse management section. In 1959, he was transferred to the Ministry of Internal Affairs as a commissioner.

In 1963, Zhou retired due to suffering from severe gastric ulcers. In 1964, he studied at the Central Institute of Socialism. In 1968, amidst the Cultural Revolution, Zhou was discovered to have been part of a dining group organised by the brother of Wang Guangmei. Wang was the wife of Liu Shaoqi, a former president who was purged by Mao Zedong. Mao's wife Jiang Qing used materials provided by Red Guards to incriminate Zhou Enshou and then conveyed the evidence to Zhou Enlai. When Zhou Enlai learned that Liu's brother-in-law was involved, he realized the issue was politically sensitive and reported it to Mao. Mao told him to deal with it as he saw fit. As a result, Zhou Enlai instructed the People's Liberation Army's Beijing Garrison to arrest his brother and place him in "protective detention". Zhou Enshou remained imprisoned until May 1975 and was unable to attend his brother's funeral in 1976 due to the ongoing charges against him.

In May 1979, three years after the end of the Cultural Revolution, the Central Organization Department of the Chinese Communist Party reviewed his case and exonerated him. From 1980, Zhou served as a member of the Fifth and Sixth National Committees of the Chinese People's Political Consultative Conference (CPPCC). Zhou died in Beijing on 13 May 1985.

== Personal life ==
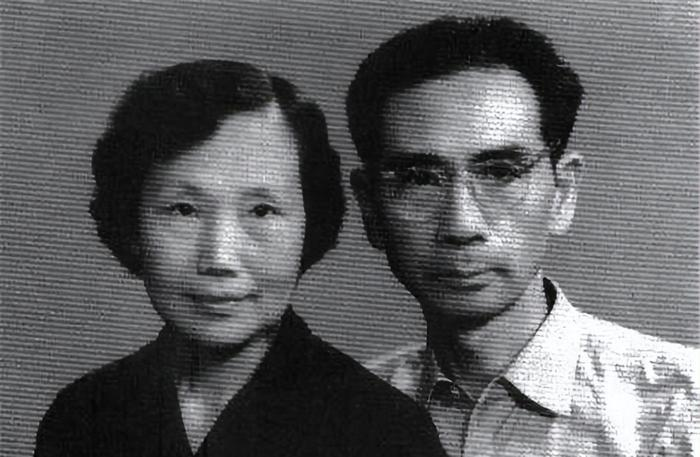
Zhou with his wife Wang Shiqin

Zhou and his wife Wang Shiqin had seven children—three daughters, three sons, and one who died at a young age. Three of the couple's children, including Zhou Bingde, were raised by Zhou Enlai and his wife Deng Yingchao in Zhongnanhai.
