= Huang Wei (actress) =

Chinese actress (born 1964)

- 黄薇
- Born: 1964 (age 61–62); Beijing, China
- Education: Communication University of China
- Occupations: Actress; TV host
- Years active: 1987–present

Huang Wei (Chinese: 黄薇; pinyin: Huáng Wēi; born 1964) is a Chinese actress and TV host for the China Central Television (CCTV).

== Biography ==
Huang was born in 1964 in Beijing, to a family of senior intellectuals. Her father worked in diplomatic field and her mother was a teacher. In her early years, she studied at Beijing No. 5 High School and later entered the Broadcasting Department of the Beijing Broadcasting Institute (now Communication University of China). Following her graduation in 1987, Huang was assigned as a TV host with the China Central Television (CCTV). She is married to Yu Jingshun and the couple have a daughter.

As TV host with CCTV, she hosted youth program Between Heaven and Earth, legal program Social Latitude and Longitude and service program Walking With You. In 1996, he began hosting a program Sunset Red. In 1998, her first acting role was in the movie Mrs. Li Zhifan. In the movie, she was cast as Deng Yingchao, the wife of the first Premier of the People's Republic of China Zhou Enlai.

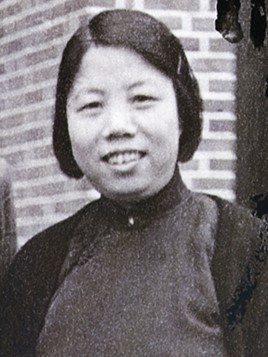
Huang is notable for her portrayal of Deng Yingchao (pictured), a role that she played in much of her acting career.

From then on, she was cast as Deng in several Chinese historical movies and TV shows such as Founding Leader Mao Zedong (1999), The Long March (2001), Ode to Yan'an (2004), The Founding of a Republic (2009), Mao Zedong (2013), A New World (2018), and Diplomatic Storm (2019), portraying her for over 20 years and the role she portrayed for most of her entertainment career.

In 2020, she produced an eight-episode show Leling Changxiang (joyful singing in old age), which featured 32 choirs with approximately 2000 senior singers performing on CCTV. The concept for the show originated when she read an article about the best exercises for health, which highlighted singing as particularly beneficial for the elderly. The article noted that singing promotes happiness, potentially extending their lifespan. In the 2021 historical drama Striking the Water, she was cast as Yang Zhende, the mother of Deng Yingchao, which became her first different role.

== Filmography ==
Key
| † | Denotes works that have not yet been released |

=== Film ===
| Year | English title | Chinese title | Role | Notes/Ref. |
|---|---|---|---|---|
| 1998 | Mrs. Li Zhifan | 李知凡太太 | Deng Yingchao | |
| 2000 | To Be with You Forever | 相伴永远 | Deng Yingchao | |
| 2009 | Founding of a Republic | 建国大业 | Deng Yingchao | |
| 2011 | The Big Picture | 大格局 | Deng Yingchao | |
| 2012 | Zhou Enlai Returned to Yan'an | 周恩来回延安 | Deng Yingchao | |
| 2019 | Mao Zedong 1949 | 决胜时刻 | Deng Yingchao | |

=== Television ===
| Year | English title | Chinese title | Role | Notes/Ref. |
|---|---|---|---|---|
| 1999 | Founding Leader Mao Zedong | 开国领袖毛泽东 | Deng Yingchao | |
| 2000 | Sunrise in the East | 日出东方 | Deng Yingchao | |
| 2001 | Deng Xiaoping in 1925 | 邓小平在1925年 | Deng Yingchao | |
| 2001 | The Long March | 长征 | Deng Yingchao | |
| 2003 | Ode to Yan'an | 延安颂 | Deng Yingchao | |
| 2006 | General Chen Gang | 陈赓大将 | Deng Yingchao | |
| 2007 | Zhou Enlai in Chongqing | 周恩来在重庆 | Deng Yingchao | |
| 2009 | Liberation | 解放 | Deng Yingchao | |
| 2009 | The East | 东方 | Deng Yingchao | |
| 2013 | Mao Zedong | 毛泽东 | Deng Yingchao | |
| 2016 | My Uncle Zhou Enlai | 周恩来在重庆 | Deng Yingchao | |
| 2018 | Change The World | 换了人间 | Deng Yingchao | |
| 2019 | Forever Comrades | 永远的战友 | Deng Yingchao | |
| 2019 | Diplomatic Situation | 外交风云 | Deng Yingchao | |
| 2021 | The Red Leaves of Xiangshan | 香山叶正红 | Deng Yingchao | |
| 2021 | Striking the Water | 中流击水 | Yang Zhende | |
| 2024 | Battle of Shangganling | 上甘岭 | Deng Yingchao | |
| TBA | People's Premier Zhou Enlai | 人民总理周恩来 | Deng Yingchao | |
| TBA | Nanjing Negotiations | 南京谈判 | Deng Yingchao | |
