= Liang Xiaosheng =

Chinese writer (born 1949)

- 梁晓声
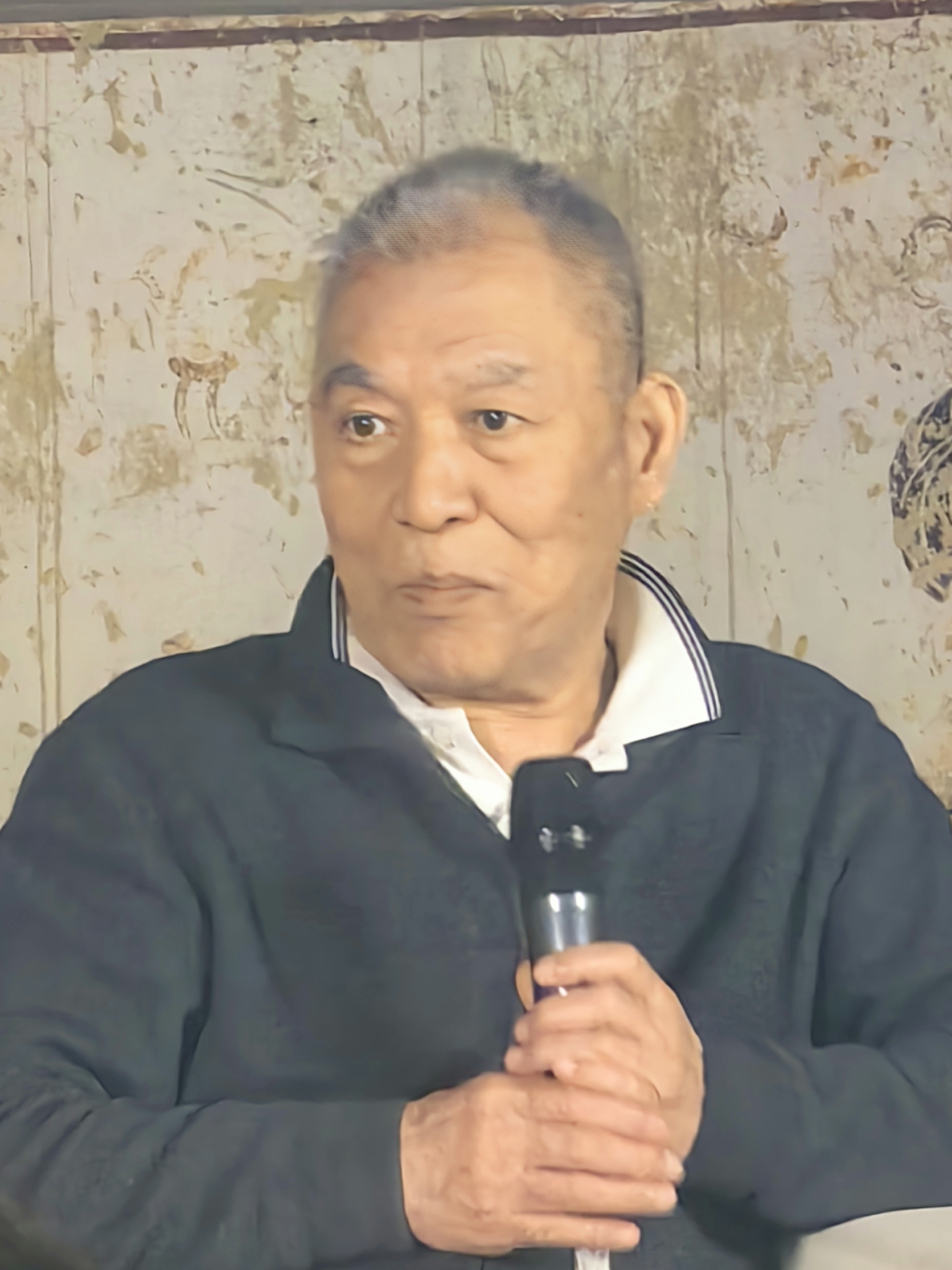
- Liang Xiaosheng (2026)
- Born: Liang Xiaosheng (梁绍生); September 22, 1949 (age 77); Harbin, Heilongjiang, China
- Education: Fudan University
- Occupations: Novelist, screenwriter
- Spouse: Jiao Dan
- Writing career
- Language: Chinese
- Period: 1979–present
- Genres: Novel, screenplay
- Subject: Sent-down youth
- Notable works: The Human World; The Floating City; A Red Guard's Confessions; The City of Snow

Liang Xiaosheng (simplified Chinese: 梁晓声; traditional Chinese: 梁曉聲; pinyin: Liáng Xiǎoshēng; born 22 September 1949) is a Chinese novelist and screenwriter. Liang is a member of the China Writers Association. He is also a professor at Beijing Language and Culture University. His novels have been translated into English, French, Japanese, Russian, and Italian. The "two modern satires" Deaf and Panic have also been translated into English.

== Biography ==
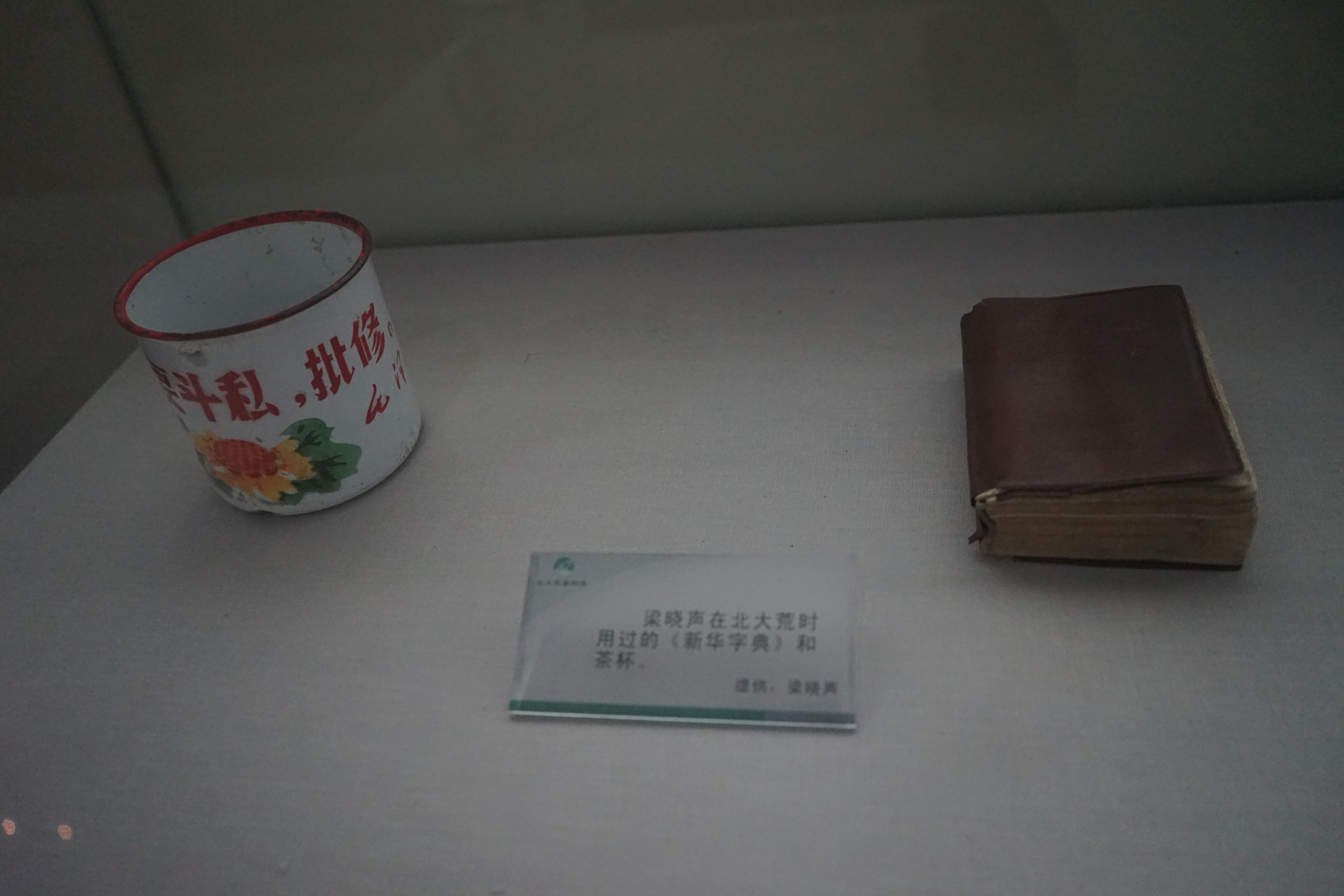
Cup and dictionary Liang Xiaosheng used at Great Northern Wilderness

Liang was born in Harbin, Heilongjiang in 1949, with his ancestral hometown in Rongcheng, Shandong.

In 1966, when the Cultural Revolution was launched by Mao Zedong, Liang graduated from Harbin 29th High School (Chinese: 哈尔滨第二十九中学). Two years later, Liang went to the Great Northern Wilderness and worked in Shenyang Military Region.

In 1974, Liang was accepted to Fudan University and graduated in 1977. After graduation, he was assigned to Beijing Film Studio as an editor. In 1988, Liang was transferred to China Children's Film Studio.

Liang started to publish novels in 1979. His most well-known works are The Floating City (Chinese: 浮城), A Red Guard's Confessions (Chinese: 一个红卫兵的自白), From Fudan University to Beijing Film Academy (Chinese: 从复旦到北影), The City of Snow (Chinese: 雪城), and The Depressed Chinese (Chinese: 郁闷的中国人).

His 1993 novel The Floating City describes depicts a southeastern Chinese metropolis mysteriously disconnected form the mainland.

== Personal life ==
In 1972, Liang, as a sent-down youth, was sent to Beidahuang for labor reform and met his first love Dong Qiujuan (董秋娟), and they later broke up. During his study at Fudan University, Liang was introduced to Jiao Dan (焦丹), who was 6 years his junior, and they got married.

== Works ==
=== Novels ===
- Pretty Women (Chinese: 伊人伊人)
- The Floating City (Chinese: 浮城)
- A Red Guard's Confessions (Chinese: 一个红卫兵的自白)
- From Fudan University to Beijing Film Academy (Chinese: 从复旦到北影)
- The City of Snow (Chinese: 雪城)
- The Depressed Chinese (Chinese: 郁闷的中国人)
- The Human World (Chinese: 人世间)
- My Destiny (Chinese: 我和我的命). Translated by Howard Goldblatt. San Francisco: Long River Press, 2026, ISBN 1592652727.

=== Novellas ===
- The World's Life (Chinese: 人间烟火)
- There Is A Storm Tonight (Chinese: 今夜有暴风雨)

=== Short stories ===
- If Heaven Has Feelings (Chinese: 天若有情)
- Death (Chinese: 死神)
- This Is A Mystical Land (Chinese: 这是一片神奇的土地)
- Panic and Deaf: Two Modern Satires. Translated by Hanming Chen. Honolulu: University of Hawai'i Press, 2001, ISBN 0-8248-2250-1.

== Awards ==
- This Is A Mystical Land – National Short Story Award (1983)
- Father – National Short Story Award (1984)
- There Is A Storm Tonight – National Novella Award (1984)
- The Human World –10th Mao Dun Literature Prize
