= Tianjin Women's Federation =

- 天津市妇女联合会
- Abbreviation: TJWF
- Formation: November 5, 1949
- Type: Non-profit organization
- Headquarters: Tianjin, China
- Parent organization: All-China Women's Federation

The Tianjin Women's Federation (Chinese: 天津市妇女联合会, abbreviated TJWF) is a mass organization for women in Tianjin, China. It is under the leadership of the Tianjin Municipal Committee of the Chinese Communist Party and serves as a local branch of the All-China Women's Federation. Efforts to establish the Tianjin Municipal Democratic Women's Federation (Chinese: 天津市民主妇女联合会) started in March 1949 with 21 employees and completed in 7 November that year. It was renamed to Tianjin Municipal Women's Federation (Chinese: 天津市妇女联合会) in November 1959. In the midst of the Cultural Revolution, it shut down in 1966 but reopened in 1973.
