= A Lifelong Journey =

2022 Chinese web series

- Traditional Chinese: 人世間
- Simplified Chinese: 人世间
- Hanyu Pinyin: rén shì jiān
- Genre: Historical fiction
- Based on: three generations of a family surnamed Zhou in a provincial capital city in Northeast China working hard to create a better life from
- Written by: Liang Xiaosheng
- Directed by: Li Lu
- Presented by: Shen Haixiong
- Starring: Lei Jiayin; Xin Baiqing; Song Jia; Yin Tao
- Country of origin: China
- Original language: Mandarin
- No. of episodes: 58 (35 in TVB version)

Original release
- Release: January 28, 2022

A Lifelong Journey (Chinese: 人世间; pinyin: Rén shìjiān; lit. 'The secular world') is a period drama released in mainland China in 2022. It is adapted from Liang Xiaosheng's novel "A Lifelong Journey". Directed by Li Lu, it stars Lei Jiayin, Xin Baiqing, Song Jia, Yin Tao. It was premiered on CCTV1 and iQiyi on January 28, 2022, and broadcast on Jiangsu Satellite TV on February 24, 2022. Radio Television Hong Kong purchased the broadcasting rights in Hong Kong in 2022, and it will be broadcast on RTHK TV 31 "Weekend National Drama Theater". On February 18, the lead actress Sarina revealed in an interview with the media that Disney has purchased the global copyright of the play. The show is expected to be broadcast outside mainland China through Disney+.

== Synopsis ==
The play tells the story of three generations of a family surnamed Zhou in a provincial capital city in Northeast China working hard to create a better life from the late period of Cultural Revolution to after Reform and Opening Up.

== Cast ==
Name	Role	introduction
Ding Yongdai	Zhou Zhigang	Zhou father
Sarina	Li Suhua	Mother Zhou
Xin Baiqing; Boy: Feng Xiaotong	Zhou Bingyi	Zhou's eldest son
Sui Junbo	Hao Dongmei	Zhou Bingyi's wife
Ma Shaohua	Governor Hao	Hao Dongmei's father, Zhou Bingyi's father-in-law
Song Chunli	Jin Yueji	Hao Dongmei's mother, Zhou Bingyi's mother-in-law
Song Jia; Junior: Marfandin	Zhou Rong	Daughter of the Zhou family (ranked second)
Cheng Taishen	Feng Huacheng	Zhou Rong's husband, later divorced
Wang Yang	Cai Xiaoguang	Admired Zhou Rong since childhood, Zhou Rong's later husband
Hu Lianxin	Feng Yue	Daughter of Zhou Rong and Feng Huacheng
Lei Jiayin; Boy: Jiang Guannan	Zhou Bingkun	Zhou's youngest son
Yin Tao	Zheng Juan	Zhou Bingkun's wife
Boy: Guo Ziming; Childhood: Zhu Binyu	Zhou Cong	Son of Zhou Bingkun and Zheng Juan
Boy: Wu Xingjian; Childhood: Dai Haoyu	Zhou Nan	Son of Zheng Juan, adopted son of Zhou Bingkun
Wei Qing	Mother Zheng	Zheng Juan's mother
Boy: Han Haolin; Adult: Ke Xu	Zheng Guangming	Zheng Juan's younger brother
Bai Zhidi	Ma Shouchang	Qu Xiuzhen's husband
Zhang Kaili	Qu Xiuzhen	Zhou Bingkun Former leader
Zhang Jibo	Chunyan Dad	Father Joe
Xu Songzi	Chunyan mother	Mother Joe
Huang Xiaolei	Qiao Chunyan	The third daughter of the Qiao family, who loves Zhou Bingkun
Zhang Ruihan	Cao Debao	Qiao Chunyan's husband, Zhou Bingkun made a young
Song Chuyan	Sun Chaochao	Friends of Zhou Bingkun
Xu Baihui	Yu Hong	Sun Chaochao's wife
Fang Yueqiao	Sun Xiaoning	Sun Chaochao's younger sister likes Zhou Bingkun
Wang Daqi	Xiao Guoqing	Friends of Zhou Bingkun
Wang Yichan	Wu Qian	Xiao Guoqing's wife
Gong Hongjia	Lu Chuan	Friends of Zhou Bingkun
Miao Chi	Tang Xiangyang	Friends of Zhou Bingkun
Jiang Han	Chang Jin Bu	Workmate Zhou Bingkun
Lu Yi	Provincial leaders	
Hu Jing	City leaders	
Fang Zi Bin	Gong Wei Ze	The civilian policeman of the "photon film" where the Zhou family lived, was later promoted to the director of the Municipal Public Security Bureau
Yin Jian	Gong Bin	Nephew of Gong Weize
Ding Haifeng	Chang Yuhuai	
Yu Zhen	Luo Shibin	
Rong Zixi	Zeng Shan	Luo Shibin's wife
Sun Zhihong	water flow	Luo Shibin friend
Shen Xiaohai	Tu Zhiqiang	Zhou Bingkun's co-worker, executed for homicide, Zheng Juan's fiancé
Pan Binlong	Li Wanquan	
Li Jianyi	The Old Secretary	
Zhao Xiaorui	Du Dehai	
Shu Yaoxuan	Professor Wang	
Feng Lei	Yao Lisong	Comrade Zhou Bingyi
Liu Xiaoye	Dong Weihong	Yao Lisong's wife
Xu Xiaosa	Tao Junshu	
Yu Yue	Wang Zi	
Li Guangfu	Minister Ming	
Bian Tao	Shao Jingwen	
Xu Wenguang	Director Xu	
Xu Min	Minister Sheng	
Wang Qing	Li Shuanghua	
Hong Junjia	Peng Xinsheng	
Li Xuezheng	Uncle Xiong	
White Red Label	Jiang Enpei	
Li Daqiang	Liao Jianwu	
Huang Junpeng	Deputy Director Wan	
Hu Lianhua	President of Publishing House	
Ren Mingsong	Golden Flower	
Ge Ziming	Secretary Tang	
Li Zhuozhao	Cao Yuanfang	
Li Sibo	Bear	

== Broadcast time ==
Channel	Location	Broadcast Date	Broadcast Time	Remarks
CCTV1	China	January 28, 2022 – March 1, 2022		Prime Time Theater
Jiangsu Satellite TV	China	February 24, 2022-		
Hong Kong TV 31	Hong Kong	October 27, 2022-	20:30-22:00	National drama 830, 2 episodes
Guangdong Satellite TV	China	June 2022-		Vigorous Theater
Beijing Satellite TV	China	August 2022-		Red Star Theater
Eight First Station	Taiwan	to be determined	to be determined	

== Soundtrack ==
No.	Title	Lyrics	Music	singer	Length
1.	""The World"" (theme song, ending song)	Tang Tian	Qian Lei	Lei Jia
2.	""Photographic film"" (episode)	Zhang Yilin	Zhang Yilin	Zhou Shen
3.	""Lights"" (Interlude)	Cui Shixuan	Shu Nan	Yi Liyuan

== Evaluation ==
China News Service interview of author Liang Xiaosheng.

The average ratings of this drama ranks first in the same period of TV dramas on all star channels, Attracting 310 million people to watch the drama, it has received a lot of praise and has become a hit at the beginning of the year.
