= Golden Eagle Award for Best Television Series (China) =

Main category of the Golden Eagle Awards

Golden Eagle Award for Best Television Series (Chinese name:中国电视金鹰奖最佳电视连续剧) is a main category of the Golden Eagle Awards. The Best Television Series is given to one drama, while the other nominated works are recognised as Outstanding Television Series. This category was absent in 2016.

== Winners list ==
=== 2020s ===
Year	Number	Title	S. Chinese Title
2024	32nd	Three-Body	三体
2024	32nd	The Forerunner	问苍茫
2024	32nd	Blossoms Shanghai	繁花
2024	32nd	The Knockout	狂飙
2024	32nd	The Long Season	漫长的季节
2024	32nd	A Dream of Splendor	梦华录
2024	32nd	Meet Yourself	去有风的地方
2024	32nd	Bright Future	县委大院
2024	32nd	Wild Bloom	风吹半夏
2022	31st	The Awakening Age	觉醒年代
2022	31st	Refinement of Faith	百炼成钢
2022	31st	Enemy	对手
2022	31st	Medal of the Republic	功勋
2022	31st	The Mission of Top Secret	绝密使命
2022	31st	Crossing the Yalu River	跨过鸭绿江
2022	31st	A Lifelong Journey	人世间
2022	31st	Minning Town	山海情
2022	31st	The Stage	装台
2020	30th	Diplomatic Situation	'外交风云
2020	30th	Like a Flowing River	大江大河
2020	30th	The Longest Day in Chang'an	长安十二时辰
2020	30th	The Thunder	破冰行动
2020	30th	The Story of Minglan	知否知否应是绿肥红瘦
2020	30th	A Little Reunion	小欢喜
2020	30th	The Communist Liu Shaoqi	共产党人刘少奇
2020	30th	All is Well	都挺好

=== 2010s ===
Year	Number	Title	S. Chinese Title
2018	29th	My Uncle Zhou Enlai	海棠依旧
2018	29th	White Deer Plain	白鹿原
2018	29th	Feather Flies to the Sky	鸡毛飞上天
2018	29th	Heroes of Defense	绝命后卫师
2018	29th	Change the World	换了人间
2018	29th	Love in a Courtyard	情满四合院
2018	29th	The Grainfield	天下粮田
2018	29th	Original Inspiration	初心
2018	29th	Pretty Li Huizhen	漂亮的李慧珍
2018	29th	The Colors of Ardent	热血军旗
2018	29th	Shall I Compare You to a Spring Day	春风十里，不如你
2018	29th	In the Spring	春天里
2016	28th	Ten Rides of Red Army	十送红军
2016	28th	A Civic Yuppie in Countryside	马向阳下乡记
2016	28th	All Quiet in Peking	北平无战事
2016	28th	Ordinary World	平凡的世界
2016	28th	The Legend of Mi Yue	芈月传
2016	28th	The Whirlwind Girl	旋风少女
2016	28th	Deng Xiaoping at History's Crossroads	历史转折中的邓小平
2016	28th	Wang Dahua Revolutionary Career	王大花的革命生涯
2016	28th	Hey Daddy	王大花的革命生涯
2016	28th	Lu Jun Yi Hao	陆军一号
2016	28th	Break Through	破阵
2014	27th	Jiao Yulu	焦裕禄
2014	27th	Search Path	寻路
2014	27th	The Qin Empire: School of Diplomacy	大秦帝国之纵横
2014	27th	Mao Zedong	毛泽东
2014	27th	Romance of our Parents	父母爱情
2014	27th	Under Changbai Mountains My Family	长白山下我的家
2014	27th	Nie Rongzhen	聂荣臻
2014	27th	Legend of Dance and Music	舞乐传奇
2014	27th	Dog Beating Stick	打狗棍
2014	27th	Mother	母亲母亲
2014	27th	Warrior Gone	壮士出川
2014	27th	Mazu	妈祖
2014	27th	To Elderly With Love	老有所依
2014	27th	Nos années françaises	我们的法兰西岁月
2014	27th	Ip Man	叶问
2014	27th	My Land, My Home	我的土地我的家
2014	27th	Fate of the Country	国家命运
2014	27th	Orphan of Zhao	赵氏孤儿案
2014	27th	Original Hometown	原乡
2014	27th	Police Officer in a Military Camp	营盘镇警事
2014	27th	The Patriot Yue Fei	精忠岳飞
2012	26th	China 1921	中国1921
2012	26th	A Woman as Beautiful as a Flower	女人如花 (厂花)
2012	26th	China's Land	中国地
2012	26th	Legend of Shaolin Kungfu III : Heroes of the Great Desert	少林寺传奇之大漠英豪
2012	26th	In Your Prime	风华正茂
2012	26th	The East	东方
2012	26th	Man from the North	北方汉子
2012	26th	An Ancient Village and the Women	古村女人
2012	26th	Forever Designation	永不磨灭的番号
2012	26th	The Loop	我叫王土地
2012	26th	1911 Revolution	辛亥革命
2012	26th	The Eagle That is Flying Away	远去的飞鹰
2012	26th	Running into Good Luck	抬头见喜
2012	26th	Madam Shexiang	奢香夫人
2012	26th	Cliff / The Brink	悬崖
2012	26th	Broken Thorn	断刺
2012	26th	Snow Leopard	雪豹
2012	26th	Empresses in the Palace	后宫·甄嬛传
2012	26th	Promise of this Life	誓言今生
2012	26th	Before Dawn	黎明之前
2012	26th	Miss Jiang	江姐
2010	25th	Liberation	解放
2010	25th	A Beautiful Daughter-in-law Era	媳妇的美好时代
2010	25th	On Brother's Happiness	老大的幸福
2010	25th	Red Cardle	红色摇篮
2010	25th	The Summer	那年·夏天
2010	25th	Wang Gui and Anna	王贵与安娜
2010	25th	Women's Country	女人的村庄
2010	25th	My Youthfulness	我的青春谁做主
2010	25th	The Legend of Bruce Lee	李小狼传奇
2010	25th	Going to West Gate	走西口
2010	25th	My Brother Shunliu	我的兄弟叫顺溜

=== 2000s ===
Year	Number	Title	S. Chinese Title
2008	24th	Pathfinding to the Northeast	闯关东
2008	24th	The Story of Xi Gengtian	喜耕田的故事
2008	24th	Soldiers Sortie	士兵突击
2008	24th	Jinggang Mountain	井冈山
2008	24th	Golden Marriage	金婚
2008	24th	A Dream of Youth	恰同学少年
2008	24th	Gebi Mother	戈壁母亲
2008	24th	Zhou Enlai in Chongqing	周恩来在重亲
2008	24th	Stand by Me	奋斗
2008	24th	Broken the Jade	玉碎
2008	24th	Xun Huisheng	荀慧生
2006	23rd	Ren Changxia	任长霞
2006	23rd	Flos Sphorae	乔家大院
2006	23rd	Showing Sword	亮剑
2006	23rd	Papa Can You Hear Me Sing?	搭错车
2006	23rd	Witness of Memories	记忆的证明
2006	23rd	Lu Liang Heroes	吕梁英雄传
2006	23rd	Prison Camp Jiangtang	江塘集中营
2006	23rd	Shachang Dian Bing	沙场点兵
2006	23rd	Beautiful Field	美丽的田野
2006	23rd	Sky of History	历史的天空
2006	23rd	Home with Kids	家有儿女
2004	22nd	The Song of Yan'an	延安颂
2004	22nd	The Greatest Dyehouse	大染坊
2004	22nd	Yu Guanyin	玉观音
2004	22nd	Guitu Ru Hong	归途如虹
2004	22nd	Jiehun Shi Nian	结婚十年
2004	22nd	Langman De Shi	浪漫的事
2004	22nd	Xinxijun	新四军
2004	22nd	Huedi Quanli	绝对权力
2004	22nd	The Greatest Building	天下第一楼
2003	21st	The Field of Hope	希望的田野
2003	21st	Secretary of a Provincial Committee of the CPC	省委书记
2003	21st	DA Division	DA师
2003	21st	Miracle Doctor Xi Laile	神医喜来乐
2003	21st	Red Poppies	尘埃落定
2003	21st	Liu Laogen Part II	刘老根（第二部）
2003	21st	The Story of Cooking Class	炊事班的故事
2003	21st	The Secret History of Xiaozhuang Queen	孝庄秘史
2003	21st	Big-feet Queen	大脚马皇后
2002	20th	Changzheng	长征
2002	20th	Kangxi Wangchao	康熙王朝
2002	20th	Jiqing Ranshao De Suiyue	激情燃烧的岁月
2002	20th	Chengzhe Gesheng De Chibang	乘着歌声的翅膀
2002	20th	Da Faguan	大法官
2002	20th	Yong Bu Fangqi	永不放弃
2002	20th	Zhongcheng	忠诚
2002	20th	Kong Jingzi	空镜子
2002	20th	Jin Huo Zhi Nian	今惑之年
2000	18th	Gangtie Shi Zenyang Lian Cheng De	钢铁是怎样炼成的
2000	18th	Kaiguo Lingxiu Mao Zedong	开国领袖毛泽东
2000	18th	Tuchu Chongwei	突出重围
2000	18th	Yong Bu Mingmu	永不瞑目
2000	18th	Zhongguo Mingyun De Juezhan	中国命运的决战
2000	18th	Palace of Desire	大明宫词
2000	18th	Xingjing Bense	刑警本色
2000	18th	Pinzui Zhangda Min De Xingfu Shenghuo	贫嘴张大民的幸福生活
2000	18th	Tian Jiaoshou Jia Se Ershiba Ge Baomu	田教授家的二十八个保姆
2000	18th	Beijing Nüren	北京女人

=== 1990s ===
Year	Number	Title	S. Chinese Title
1999	17th	My Fair Princess	还珠格格
1999	17th	Yongzheng Dynasty	雍正王朝
1999	17th	To Lead by the Hand	牵手
1999	17th	Sisters	姐妹
1999	17th	Graduate	毕业生
1999	17th	Red Prescription	红处方
1999	17th	Mother in Law, Daughter in Law, Sister in Law	婆婆·媳妇·小姑
1999	17th	Heaven can Mercy	天若有情
1999	17th	Ah, the Mountain	啊，山还是山
1999	17th	Shaoxin Brainman	绍兴师爷
1998	16th	The Water Margin	水浒传
1998	16th	Renjian Zhengdao	人间正道
1998	16th	Hong Shizi Fang Dui	红十字方队
1997	15th	Peacetime	和平年代
1997	15th	Ernü Qing Chang	儿女情长
1997	15th	Xhejian Zhuren	车间主任
1996	14th	Chancellor Liu Luoguo	宰相刘罗锅
1996	14th	Cangtian Zai Shang	苍天在上
1996	14th	Zan Ba Zan Ma	咱爸咱妈
1995	13th	Romance of the Three Kingdoms	三国演义
1995	13th	Nian Lun	年轮
1995	13th	Dongfeng Shangren	东方商人
