= Deng Yingchao =

Chinese politician (1904–1992)

- 邓颖超
- Deng Yingchao during her visit to the European Parliament in 1980

4th Chairwoman of the National Committee of the Chinese People's Political Consultative Conference
- In office 17 June 1983 – 10 April 1988
- Preceded by: Deng Xiaoping
- Succeeded by: Li Xiannian

Second Secretary of the Central Commission for Discipline Inspection
- In office 22 December 1978 – 11 September 1982
- Preceded by: Post established
- Succeeded by: Huang Kecheng

Head of the Central Leading Group for Taiwan Affairs
- In office December 1979 – 1987
- Succeeded by: Yang Shangkun

Personal details
- Born: 4 February 1904 Nanning, Guangxi, Qing China
- Died: 11 July 1992 (aged 88) Beijing, China
- Party: Chinese Communist Party
- Spouse: Zhou Enlai (m. 1925; died 1976)
- Children: Sun Weishi (adopted daughter); Li Peng (adopted son)

Deng Yingchao (simplified Chinese: 邓颖超; traditional Chinese: 鄧穎超; pinyin: Dèng Yǐngchāo; Jyutping: Dang6 Wing6-ciu1; 4 February 1904 – 11 July 1992) was a Chinese revolutionary, politician and women's rights activist who was a member of the Chinese Communist Party (CCP) for more than six decades. She chaired the National Committee of the Chinese People's Political Consultative Conference (CPPCC) from 1983 to 1988, and she was the wife of Zhou Enlai, the first premier of the People's Republic of China.

Born in Guangxi, Deng became a leader of the women's movement in Tianjin during the May Fourth Movement, founding women's organizations and publications that called for women's education and employment and opposed arranged marriage and foot-binding. She joined the CCP in 1925, the year she married Zhou, and she was one of the few women to complete the Long March. During the Second Sino-Japanese War, she directed the party's work among women from Wuhan and Chongqing, and she was the only woman among the CCP's members of the People's Political Council. After the founding of the People's Republic in 1949, she was a vice chairwoman of the national women's federation and helped draft the country's first marriage law. In the reform era, she joined the Politburo, served as second secretary of the Central Commission for Discipline Inspection and headed the party's leading group on Taiwan affairs, before retiring in 1988.

== Early life and education ==
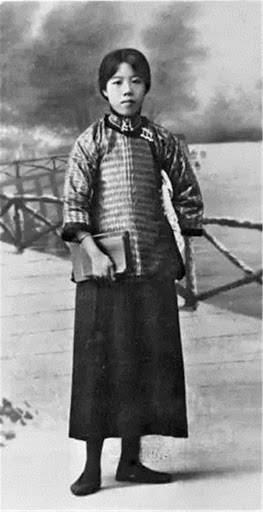
Yingchao in her youth

Deng Yingchao was born on 4 February 1904 as Deng Yu'ai in Nanning, Guangxi, with ancestral roots in Guangshan County, Henan. Her father, Deng Tingzhong, practised martial arts from an early age and later passed the imperial military examination, after which he was appointed as a garrison commander in Nanning. Her mother, Yang Zhende, was born into a wealthy family in Changsha, Hunan, and was literate and educated in traditional Chinese medicine. Following her family's decline, Yang married Deng Tingzhong.

Influenced by feudal patriarchal values, Deng Tingzhong preferred sons over daughters. Upon Deng Yingchao's birth, he intended to give her away, but Yang resisted desperately, even threatening her own life, to keep and raise the child. Deng Tingzhong showed little affection toward his daughter growing up.

Although her husband's position could have provided a comfortable life, Yang chose to live independently and supported herself by practising medicine and teaching at an elementary school rather than by relying on him. When Deng Yingchao was about three years old, her father was exiled to Xinjiang, placing the financial burden entirely on her mother. As the family of a convicted official, Yang was no longer permitted to practise medicine in Nanning, so she decided to leave the city. To make a living and support the family, the mother and daughter moved from place to place, living successively in several cities including Guangzhou, Shanghai and Tianjin. Despite living in poverty, these experiences broadened Deng's horizons and enriched her knowledge. Her mother taught her to read and taught her traditional Chinese culture, and she opposed foot-binding for her daughter. At the age of seven, Deng began learning weaving and knitting to earn money. Around that time, her father died in Xinjiang.

=== Education ===
In 1913, nine-year-old Deng began attending school when she and her mother moved to Beijing after Yang obtained a teaching position. Her mother gave her the formal name Deng Wenshu for school. Yang actively read progressive articles and books, engaging with ideas of freedom and equality, which deeply influenced her daughter. In 1916, Deng entered the Zhili First Women's Normal School with a full scholarship, where she received a comprehensive education in various subjects. She was reported to have been among the top five students in her school.

=== Early advocacy ===
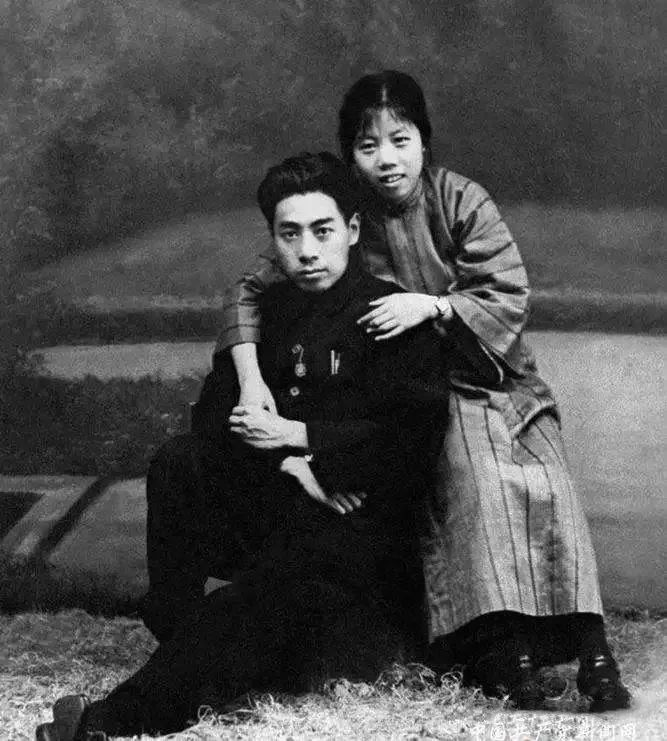
Zhou Enlai and Deng Yingchao

In 1919, at the age of fifteen, Deng participated as a team leader in the May Fourth Movement, where she met Zhou Enlai, whom she would marry in 1925 and who would later become the Premier of China. During the protests, she led a contingent of women students and was injured in clashes. That year, she and Zhou were among the founders of the Awakening Society, a progressive youth group. She was later arrested for her radical activities. During the May Fourth Movement, Deng held a pessimistic view of marriage, believing that a woman's life effectively ended when she married.

Also in 1919, Deng Yingchao helped establish the Tianjin Women Patriots' Association (Tianjin nüjie aiguo tongzhihui), which called on women to step beyond the boundaries of the household and societal expectations to participate in the "patriotic movement". As the head of its lecture group, she delivered speeches that initially appealed to women's patriotism and later expanded to advocate women's education, employment, independence, opposition to feudal marriage, and the abolition of foot-binding.

From 1920, she worked as a primary school teacher in Beijing and Tianjin. In 1922, Deng organized and led the Tianjin Women's Rights Alliance (Tianjin nüquan yundong tongmeng). In 1923, she founded the semimonthly journal Women's Star (Nüxing) and established the Women's Star Society, where she served as a leading organizer and editor. The journal focused on exposing the oppression of women and promoting women's rights. That same year, she also co-founded the Tianjin Women's Star Supplementary School, which aimed to help unemployed women gain basic education and vocational skills for self-support. In 1924, Deng participated in founding the Women's Daily (Funü ribao) and later became its chief editor and general manager. It was the only women's newspaper in China at the time and sought to reform women's thinking nationwide. The same year, she organized the Women's Star Sunday Volunteer School, which provided one-year, tuition-free education for lower- and middle-class women. On 7 June 1925, Deng helped establish the Tianjin Women's Federation (Tianjin funü lianhehui).

== Political career ==
=== Party work in the 1920s ===
In early 1924, Deng joined the Socialist Youth League in Tianjin. In March 1925, she joined the Chinese Communist Party (CCP), and she became head of the women's department of the party's Tianjin local committee. After the May Thirtieth Movement in 1925, she also helped found a citizens' association in Tianjin to support the anti-imperialist protests in Shanghai. In August 1925, the party sent her to Guangzhou as a member of its Guangdong Regional Committee and head of the committee's women's department.

During the First United Front between the CCP and the Kuomintang (KMT), Deng also worked in the KMT's Central Women's Department under He Xiangning, organizing women in support of the Nationalist Revolution. In January 1926, she was elected an alternate member of the KMT's Central Executive Committee at its Second National Congress.

=== Underground work and the Long March ===
After the KMT turned on the Communists in the Shanghai massacre of 1927, Deng and Zhou were forced underground. She then worked secretly in Shanghai for five years. In 1928, she attended the Sixth National Congress of the CCP in Moscow as a non-voting delegate. During this period, her posts included secretary of the party's Central Women's Committee, secretary to the Politburo, secretary-general of the Central Bureau, member of the Central Executive Committee of the Chinese Soviet Republic and head of the Central Committee's confidential section. In 1932, she and Zhou moved to the Jiangxi Soviet.

Deng was one of the few women to survive the Long March, a military retreat by the CCP to their new headquarters in Yan'an, Shaanxi between 1934 and 1935. During the march, she developed pulmonary tuberculosis. In December 1934, after a Politburo meeting at Liping, her work as secretary-general of the Central Committee was taken over by Deng Xiaoping.

=== Second Sino-Japanese War ===
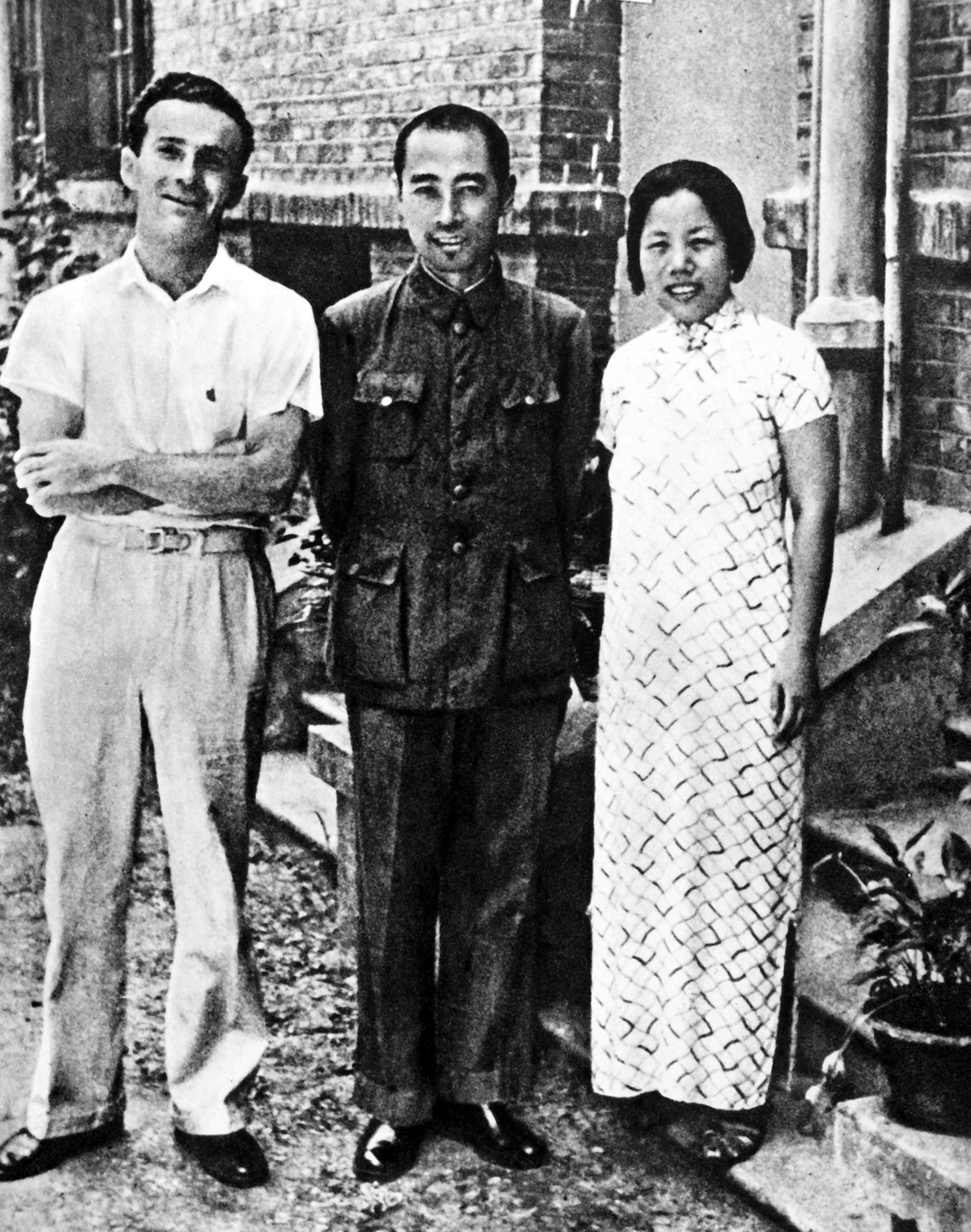
Deng and Zhou with American journalist Edgar Snow (1938)

After the outbreak of the Second Sino-Japanese War in 1937, Deng was sent to Wuhan and Chongqing to lead women's organizations. She was the women's organizer of the Eighth Route Army office in Wuhan and a member of the women's committee of the CCP's Yangtze Bureau, and she was later a member of the party's Southern Bureau and secretary of its women's committee. Deng met with women leaders from areas under KMT rule and called for the creation of a women's movement to support the national resistance against Japan. She urged women across the country, regardless of party or organizational affiliation, to put aside political disagreements and work together to defend the nation from the Japanese. In August 1937, the Second United Front between the CCP and KMT was established. In December 1937, Deng helped organize the formation of a women's committee in the Second United Front.

In 1938, she promoted the establishment of the Chinese Wartime Child Welfare Association, and she became one of its standing directors in March that year. In May 1938, she attended a women's conference at Lushan and helped draft its outline for mobilizing women for the war effort. She also gave many speeches and published articles that outlined the main goals of the women's movement, calling on rural women to take part in the war effort, for example through spring ploughing to ensure an adequate food supply or by helping to care for the wounded. She was the only woman among the CCP's members of the wartime People's Political Council.

In the summer of 1943, Deng went to Yan'an to study at the Central Party School during the rectification campaign. At the Seventh National Congress of the CCP in 1945, she was elected an alternate member of the Central Committee. She also became deputy secretary of the party's Central Women's Committee and deputy director of the preparatory committee for a women's federation of the Communist-held "liberated areas".

=== Chinese Civil War ===
During the civil war that followed, Deng was the CCP's only woman delegate to the Political Consultative Conference. In July 1947, she attended the National Land Conference at Xibaipo, and she then worked on land reform in Fuping County, Hebei. In 1948, she was acting secretary of the CCP Central Committee's Women's Movement Committee.

=== People's Republic of China ===
==== Early years ====
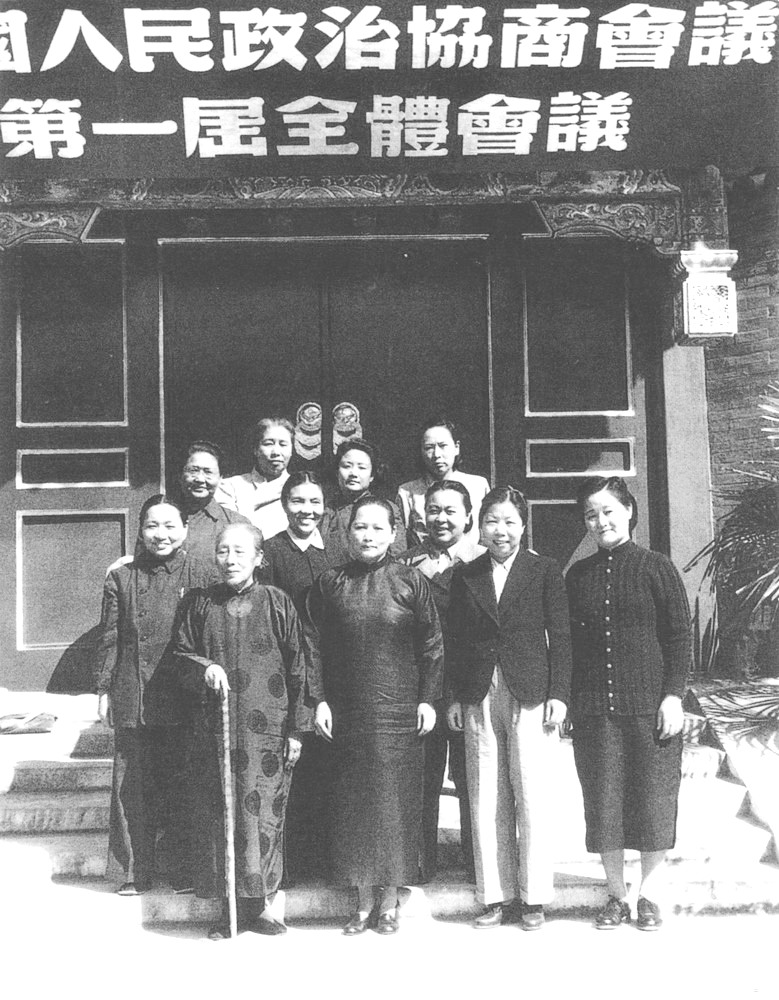
Deng (in the front row, second from right) with other female members of the 1st National Committee of the Chinese People's Political Consultative Conference (1949)

In March 1949, Deng attended the First National Congress of Chinese Women, at which she was elected a vice chairwoman of the All-China Democratic Women's Federation and became deputy secretary of its party group. She was re-elected vice chairwoman at the next two congresses. In September 1949, she attended the first plenary session of the Chinese People's Political Consultative Conference (CPPCC) and was elected to the Standing Committee of its National Committee. In the early years of the People's Republic, she ran the day-to-day work of the women's federation while Zhou was in Moscow. In September 1956, she was elected a full member of the Central Committee at the Eighth National Congress.

==== Great Leap Forward (1958–1962) ====
In 1961, when Deng and Zhou, then the premier, conducted an investigation into living conditions in rural Handan, Hebei, several people complained about the lack of food as a result of the Great Leap Forward. In response, they ordered that those people get "food provisions".

==== Cultural Revolution (1966–1976) ====
During the Cultural Revolution, Deng had a less visible public profile, limiting her public appearances to receiving foreign leaders during diplomatic trips. She did this to avoid being swept up by the political turmoil caused by her husband's central role in the Revolution. Her private profile earned her praise from CCP members who saw her as "always modest and selfless". Official Chinese accounts state that she worked with Zhou to protect party cadres and public figures and opposed the factions of Lin Biao and Jiang Qing. The Encyclopædia Britannica describes her as having survived the factional fighting of the period.

==== Later career (1976–1988) ====
After Zhou's death on 8 January 1976, Deng told relatives and medical staff following his memorial service that his ashes would be scattered over the land. In December 1976, she was elected a vice chairwoman of the Standing Committee of the 4th National People's Congress, and she was re-elected to the post by the Fifth National People's Congress in March 1978. At the third plenary session of the 11th Central Committee in December 1978, she was added to the Politburo and elected second secretary of the newly restored Central Commission for Discipline Inspection. Spouses of prominent leaders were removed from the top decision-making bodies in the reform era, but Deng was co-opted to the Politburo under Deng Xiaoping's leadership, in part because she was Zhou's widow. She also became honorary chairwoman of the All-China Women's Federation (ACWF).

From the 1950s, Deng had assisted Zhou with the party's work on Taiwan. She used her early contacts with the KMT, as well as her network and reputation from the Second United Front, to lead the Central Leading Group for Taiwan Affairs, which was established in 1979. She became head of the group in December 1979. Official accounts credit her with implementing the policy of "peaceful reunification" and "one country, two systems" put forward by Deng Xiaoping, and with guiding the drafting of the nine-point proposal on reunification announced by Ye Jianying in 1981. Yang Shangkun became head of the group in 1987. On 15 September 1988, Deng met Hu Qiuyuan, a senior member of Taiwan's Legislative Yuan who had served with her on the wartime People's Political Council and who was the first senior political figure from Taiwan to visit the mainland in 40 years. She told him that differences of belief should not stand in the way of national reunification.

From 1983 to 1988, Deng was chairwoman of the 6th National Committee of the CPPCC. In September 1985, she voluntarily applied to resign from the Central Committee. That month, she was among the veteran leaders who retired from the party leadership, and she left the Politburo. Her term as chairwoman of the CPPCC ended in April 1988, and she then retired from her leadership posts.

==== 1989 Tiananmen Square protests ====
After a month of protests against corruption and for democratic reforms that started in April 1989, the Chinese government declared martial law on 20 May. On the third day under martial law, Deng addressed a letter to student protesters in Beijing. In the letter, published in the People's Daily, she implored the protesters to stop the protest and resume classes. When students continued protesting despite the imposition of martial law, Deng advised senior CCP leaders to show restraint. Specifically, she advocated a "moderate approach" that included persuading students to end their protest.

On 4 June 1989, the People's Liberation Army was deployed to clear Tiananmen Square. It cannot be confirmed whether Deng agreed to the deployment of the army, but she publicly endorsed Deng Xiaoping's decision on 19 June.

== International and diplomatic activities ==
In September 1939, because of Zhou's illness, Deng accompanied him to the Soviet Union for medical treatment. During this period, she gained insights into the status and living conditions of Soviet women. After returning to China in 1940, she wrote several articles for the magazine Women's Lives, introducing and publicizing the achievements of the Soviet Union and the lives of Soviet women and children, with the aim of inspiring morale and confidence among Chinese women during the War of Resistance against Japan.

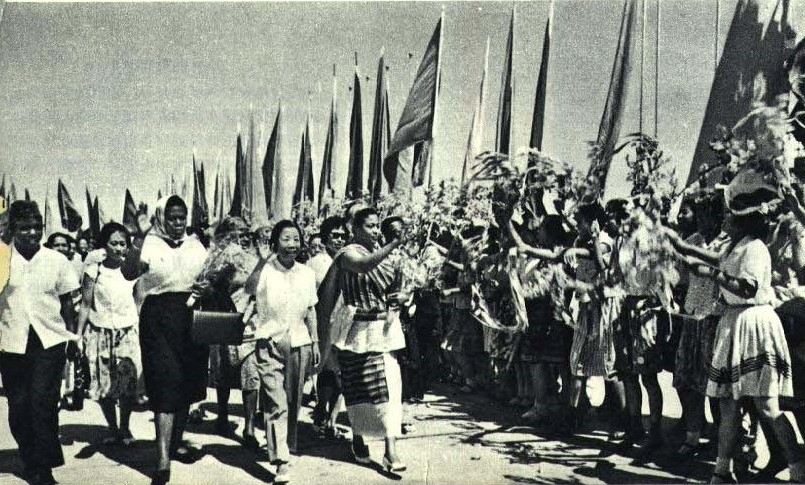
Deng at a state visit to Tanzania (1965)

In 1946, Deng travelled to Paris to attend a council meeting of the Women's International Democratic Federation (WIDF). She was elected to the Executive Council of the WIDF in 1948 and 1953. In December 1949, when the Asian Women's Representative Conference was held in Beijing, Deng served as the head of the Chinese delegation and delivered a report titled "Asian Women's Struggle for National Independence, People's Democracy, and World Peace".

During the Cultural Revolution, Deng met with women's delegations from North Korea, Syria, the United States and France, introducing them to the achievements and experiences of the Chinese women's movement. In February 1972, during U.S. President Richard Nixon's visit to China, Deng and Zhou met with Nixon and the First Lady Pat Nixon.

Deng meeting President of the European Parliament Simone Veil during Deng's visit to the European Parliament (1980)

After the end of the Cultural Revolution in 1976, Deng, then in her seventies, made official visits between 1977 and 1980 to Myanmar, Sri Lanka, Thailand, Cambodia, Japan, North Korea, Iran, France and the European Parliament. In June 1980, as a vice chairwoman of the NPC Standing Committee, she led a delegation to France, where she met President Valéry Giscard d'Estaing and the Paris mayor Jacques Chirac and visited the small hotel in Paris where Zhou had lived during his time in France. Her visit to the European Parliament in Strasbourg, where the parliament's president Simone Veil received her, was the first visit to the institution by an NPC delegation. She also received visiting heads of state and government, including the President of Mauritania Moktar Ould Daddah, the North Korean leader Kim Il-sung, the British prime minister Margaret Thatcher and the Japanese prime minister Yasuhiro Nakasone. In 1982, she became honorary president of the Chinese People's Association for Friendship with Foreign Countries.

== Advocacy for women's rights ==
=== Marriage law ===
Deng opposed the feudal system of arranged marriage and upheld the principle of freedom in marriage. Under her leadership, the drafting of the Marriage Law began in the autumn of 1948. She organized research on marriage practices across various regions, aiming to abolish the feudal marriage system and establish freedom of marriage, gender equality, monogamy, and protection of women's and children's rights.

Deng held the view that women suffered the most under feudal rule and marriage customs. Amid debates over the new law, she firmly advocated the abolition of child marriage, forced marriage, and arranged or commercialized marriages. She also supported the principle that if one party sought a divorce and mediation failed, the divorce should be granted.

By early 1949, she had helped draft the Marriage Law. The law, whose drafting she helped to lead, was the first marriage law of the People's Republic of China and gave women legal protection of their freedom of marriage.

During the deliberation of the 1954 Constitution, Deng emphasized gender equality, respect for mothers, care for children, and opposition to discrimination against mothers. In Chapter III, "The Fundamental Rights and Duties of Citizens", Article 86 of the 1954 Constitution affirms that women enjoy both the right to vote and the right to be elected. Article 96 states that women in China enjoy equal rights with men in political, economic, cultural, social and family life, and it places marriage, the family, mothers and children under the protection of the state.

=== Land reform ===
During the Land Reform Movement, Deng emphasized the need to mobilize peasant women to further the agrarian revolution. In a 1947 policy meeting on land reform, she stated that "women function as great mobilizers when they speak bitterness". In 1948, Deng advocated for rural women to take up leadership roles in the land reform movement and persuaded the top leadership of the CCP to include the liberation of women as a core tenet of the movement. She also confronted gender discrimination within the party and made sure that land reform policies addressed the unique problems rural women encountered within patriarchal families, such as the unequal domestic workload.

=== Birth control ===
According to official documents, the push for birth control began when Deng tabled a petition authored by "women" in April 1953. The petition demanded wider availability of birth control. By August 1953, Deng Xiaoping had raised the issue at the ACWF and ordered the Chinese Ministry of Health to allow contraceptive imports again and endorse their use. In a separate letter to Deng Xiaoping in May 1954, Deng Yingchao further advocated for the ban on birth control to be reversed by echoing the demands of women workers for contraceptives. In response, Deng Xiaoping ordered Xi Zhongxun, the father of Xi Jinping, to work with the Ministry of Health on the issue.

== Personal life ==
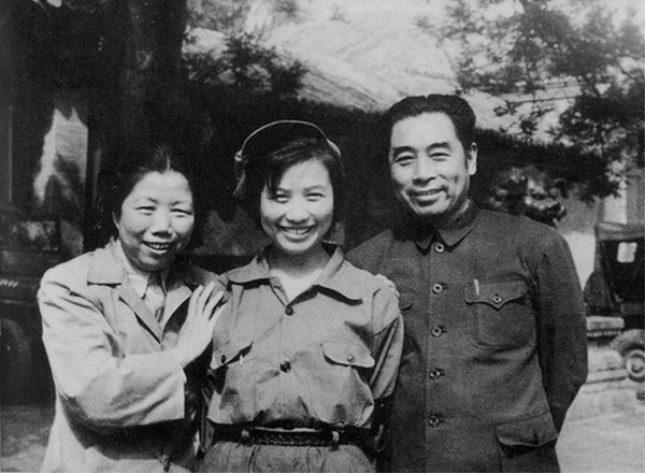
Zhou Enlai (right), Deng Yingchao (left) and their adopted daughter Sun Weishi

Deng met Zhou, who was six years older than her, during the May Fourth Movement in 1919. After Zhou went to France in 1920, they kept in touch by letter, and in 1923, she received a postcard from him in which he declared his affection for her. They married on 8 August 1925. That same year, Deng discovered that she was pregnant for the first time. Worried that pregnancy would affect her work and revolutionary activities, she secretly terminated the pregnancy without telling Zhou. In 1927, she had a difficult labour in Guangzhou, and the child, a boy whose skull was severely injured by forceps, died shortly after birth. The couple never had any children afterward. Their adopted children included Li Peng, whose revolutionary father had been killed by the Nationalists and who later became premier. Deng's mother joined her in Chongqing in May 1939 and later died there.

== Death and legacy ==
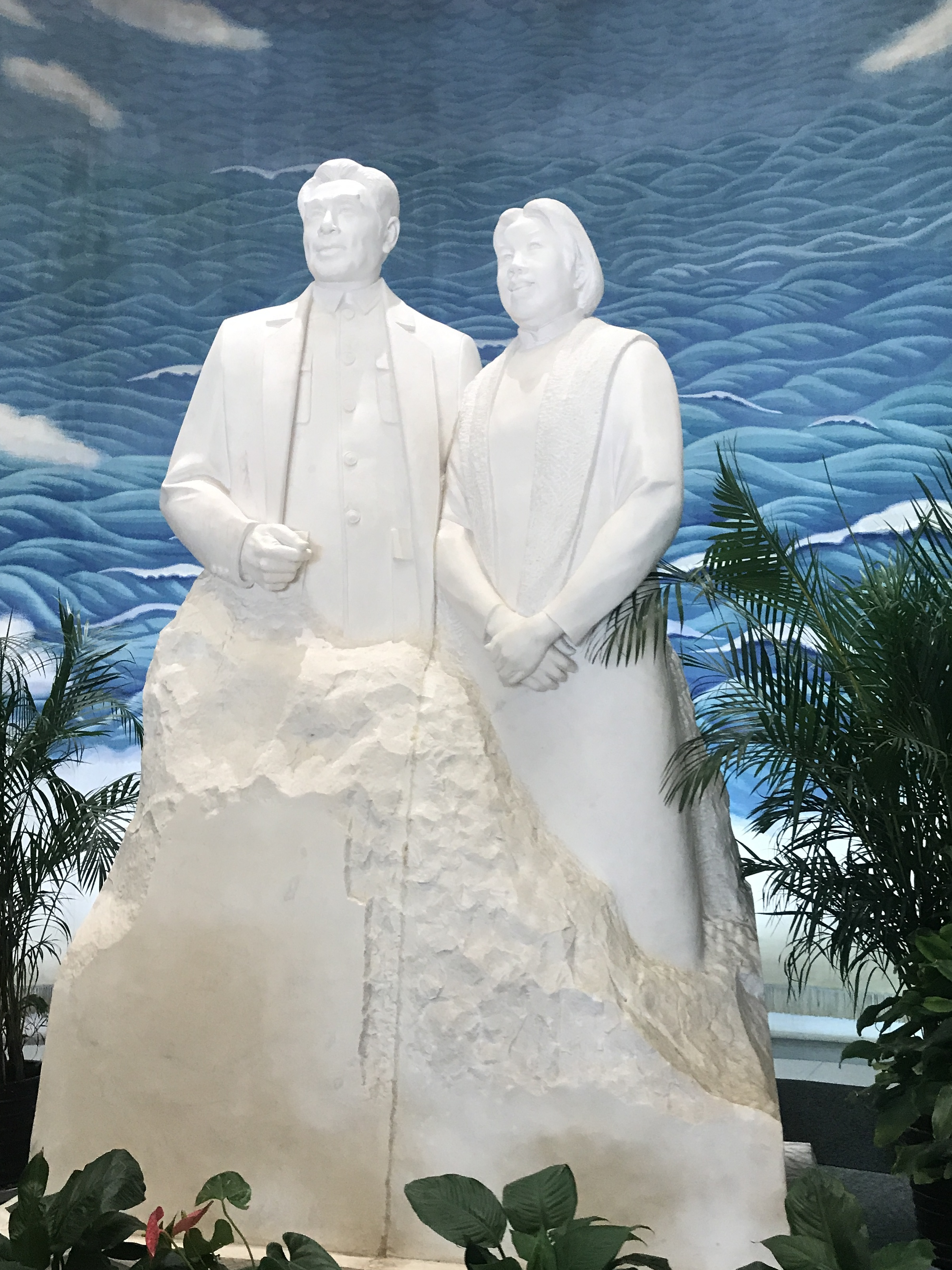
Statue of Zhou and Deng in the Memorial to Zhou Enlai and Deng Yingchao in Tianjin

After retiring, Deng's health declined. In 1990, she was admitted to hospital five times because of colds and pneumonia. In August 1991, she began to suffer from renal failure and lost consciousness several times. She had told relatives in 1982 that she had written her will and that she should not be resuscitated if she became critically ill.

At 6:55 am on 11 July 1992, Deng died in Beijing Hospital at the age of 88. In accordance with her will, her ashes were scattered in the Hai River in Tianjin, where Zhou's ashes had also been scattered. The official Party evaluation of her is "a great proletarian revolutionary, politician, famous social activist, staunch Marxist, outstanding leader of the party and the country, pioneer of the Chinese women's movement, and highly respected chairman of the Sixth CPPCC".

After 1949, she was revered in China as the nation's "elder sister". The memorial to Zhou and Deng in Tianjin's Nankai District opened on 28 February 1998, and it includes a replica of Xihuating, the couple's residence and office in Zhongnanhai. The couple regarded Tianjin, where they spent their youth, as their second hometown.

== In popular culture ==
Chinese actress Huang Wei has played Deng on screen for more than 20 years, beginning with the 1998 film Mrs. Li Zhifan, and she played her again in the 2019 television series Comrades Forever, which was made for the 70th anniversary of the People's Republic. Actress Guan Xiaotong portrayed a younger Deng in the film The Founding of an Army (2017).

Honorary titles
Preceded by None	Wife of the Premier of the People's Republic of China; 1949–1976	Succeeded by Han Zhijun
Political offices
Preceded by Deng Xiaoping	Chairman of the Chinese People's Political Consultative Conference; 1983–1988	Succeeded by Li Xiannian
