= Golden Eagle Award for Best Television Series Director (China) =

Main category of the Golden Eagle Awards

Golden Eagle Awards for Best Directing for a Television Series (Chinese name: 中国电视金鹰奖电视剧最佳导演) is a main category of the Golden Eagle Awards.

== Winners and nominees ==
=== 2020s ===
| Year | Annual | Winner(s) | Title(s) |
|---|---|---|---|
| 2024 | 32nd | Yang Lei 杨磊 | Three-Body/三体 |
| 2024 | 32nd | Wang Wei 王伟 | The Forerunner/问苍茫 |
| 2024 | 32nd | Yang Yang 杨阳 | A Dream of Splendor/梦华录 |
| 2024 | 32nd | Xin Shuang 辛爽 | The Long Season /漫长的季节 |
| 2024 | 32nd | Shen Yan 沈严 | The Heart of Genius/天才基本法 |
| 2024 | 32nd | Xu Jizhou 徐纪周 | The Knockout/狂飙 |
| 2022 | 31st | Li Lu 李路 | A Lifelong Journey/人世间 |
| 2022 | 31st | Dong Yachun 董亚春 | Crossing the Yalu River/跨过鸭绿江 |
| 2022 | 31st | Gao Xixi 高希希 | Decisive Victory/大决战 |
| 2022 | 31st | Kong Sheng 孔笙 | Minning Town/山海情 |
| 2022 | 31st | Mao Weining 毛卫宁 | Refinment of Faith/百炼成钢 |
| 2022 | 31st | Zhang Yongxin 张永新 | The Awakeing Age/觉醒年代 |
| 2020 | 30th | Kong Sheng 孔笙 | Like A Flowing River/大江大河 |
| 2020 | 30th | Bateer 巴特尔 | National Children/国家孩子 |
| 2020 | 30th | Cao Dun 曹盾 | The Longest Day in Chang'an/长安十二时辰 |
| 2020 | 30th | Liu Jiang 刘江 | The Legendary Tavern/老酒馆 |
| 2020 | 30th | Song Yeming 宋业明 | Diplomatic Situation/外交风云 |
| 2020 | 30th | Wu Ziniu 吴子牛 | The Lovely China/可爱的中国 |

=== 2010s ===
| Year | Annual | Winner(s) | Title(s) |
|---|---|---|---|
| 2018 | 29th | Chen Li 陈力 | My Uncle Zhou Enlai 海棠依旧 |
| 2018 | 29th | Yu Ding 余丁 | Feather Flies to the Sky 鸡毛飞上天 |
| 2018 | 29th | Liu Jin 刘进 | White Deer Plain |
| 2018 | 29th | Kan Weiping 阚卫平 | The Grainfield 天下粮田 |
| 2016 | 28th | Zheng Xiaolong 郑晓龙 | Red Sorghum/红高粱, Legend of Mi Yue/芈月传 |
| 2016 | 28th | Yang Yazhou 杨亚洲 | Hey Daddy 嘿，老头！ |
| 2016 | 28th | Mao Weining 毛卫宁 | Ordinary World 平凡的世界 |
| 2016 | 28th | Kong Sheng 孔笙, Li Xue 李雪 | Nirvana in Fire 琅琊榜 |
| 2014 | 27th | Zhao Baogang 赵宝刚 | To Elderly with Love/老有所依 |
| 2014 | 27th | Liu Jiang 刘江 | Unleased Love/咱们结婚吧 |
| 2012 | 26th | Yan Jiangang 阎建刚 | China's Land/中国地 |
| 2012 | 26th | Liu Jiang 刘江 | Shi yan jin sheng/誓言今生 |
| 2012 | 26th | Liu Jin 刘劲 | The Cliff/悬崖 |
| 2010 | 25th | Li Sanlin 李三林 | Go West/走西口 |
| 2010 | 25th | Zhang Li 张黎 | Ren jian zheng dao shi cang sang/人间正道是沧桑 |
| 2010 | 25th | Zhao Bao Gang 赵宝刚 | My Youth Who Call the Shots/我的青春谁做主 |

=== 2000s ===
| Year | Annual | Winner(s) | Title(s) |
|---|---|---|---|
| 2008 | 24th | Kang Honglei 康洪雷 | Soldiers Sortie/士兵突击 |
| 2008 | 24th | Jin Tao 金韬 | Jinggang Mountain/井冈山 |
| 2008 | 24th | Shen Haofang 沈好放 | Gobi Mother/戈壁母亲 |
| 2006 | 23rd | Yang Yang 杨阳 | The Proof of Memories/记忆的证明 |
| 2004 | 22nd | Yang Yazhou 杨亚洲 | Lang man de shi/浪漫的事 |
| 2003 | 21st | Zhang Shaolin 赵绍林 | Jun zhong zui hou yi ge ma bang/军中最后一个马帮 |
| 2002 | 20th | Jin Tao金韬; Tang Guoqiang 唐国强 | The Long March/长征 |
| 2001 | 19th | N/A | N/A |
| 2000 | 18th | Han Gang 韩刚; Jiana Shahati 嘉娜·沙哈提 | The Making of Steel/钢铁是怎样炼成的 |

=== 1990s ===
| Year | Annual | Winner(s) | Title(s) |
|---|---|---|---|
| 1999 | 17th | Yang Yang 杨阳 | Holding Your Hands/牵手 |
| 1998 | 16th | Huang Jiashi 黄家世 | Kuai le jia jia che/快乐家家车 |
| 1997 | 15th | Li Shu 李述; Zhang Qian 张前 | The Years of Peace/和平年代 |
