= Lu Jian =

Chinese host and anchorman (born 1972)

- 鲁健
- Born: October 4, 1972 (age 53); Alxa League, Inner Mongolia, China
- Education: Communication University of China
- Occupation: Host
- Years active: 2001 - present
- Known for: China News; Focus on
- Television: China Central Television (CCTV)
- Spouse: Zheng Tianliang
- Children: 1
- Awards: Golden Mike Award; 2010

Lu Jian (simplified Chinese: 鲁健; traditional Chinese: 魯健; pinyin: Lǔ Jiàn; born 4 October 1972) is a Chinese host and anchorman.

He won the Golden Mike Award in 2010.

== Biography ==
Lu was born in Alxa League, Inner Mongolia in October 1972; he has an elder sister. At the age of 15, his father died of cerebral thrombosis.

After graduating from Communication University of China in 2001 he was assigned to China Central Television. On March 20, 2003, Lu Jian became the first Chinese television announcer to announce the beginning of Iraq War, only one minute after CNN's first report.

== Works ==
=== Television ===
- China News (Chinese: 中国新闻)
- Focus on (Chinese: 今日关注)
- News 60 Minutes (Chinese: 新闻60分)
- Business News (Chinese: 财经时讯)

== Awards ==
- 2010 Golden Mike Award

== Personal life ==
Lu married his colleague Zheng Tianliang (郑天亮) in Beijing on March 6, 2004, who is also a host in China Central Television, the couple has a daughter.
