= The Knockout (TV series) =

2023 Chinese TV series

- Official poster
- Simplified Chinese: 狂飙
- Traditional Chinese: 狂飆
- Hanyu Pinyin: Kuángbiāo
- Genre: Criminal drama
- Written by: Zhu Junyi; Xu Jizhou
- Directed by: Xu Jizhou
- Starring: Zhang Yi; Zhang Songwen; Li Yitong; Zhang Zhijian; Wu Gang
- Country of origin: China
- Original language: Mandarin
- No. of seasons: 1
- No. of episodes: 39

Production
- Executive producers: Xia Xiaohui; Dai Ying
- Production locations: Jiangmen, Guangdong
- Production companies: iQIYI; Liubai Film and Television

Original release
- Network: CCTV-8 / iQIYI
- Release: January 14 – February 1, 2023

The Knockout (Chinese: 狂飙) is a 2023 Chinese criminal drama directed by Xu Jizhou, starring Zhang Yi, Zhang Songwen, Li Yitong, Zhang Zhijian, and Wu Gang. It tells the story of a police officer's fight against organized crime over a period of 20 years, showing the rise and fall of underworld figures and corrupt officials. It premiered in China via CCTV-8 and iQIYI starting January 14, 2023. The show takes place in the fictional city of Jinghai, chronicling the 21-year feud between incorruptible policeman An Xin and fishmonger-turned-mobster Gao Qiqiang.

== Overview ==
The show is a 2023 Chinese criminal drama directed by Xu Jizhou, starring Zhang Yi, Zhang Songwen, Li Yitong, Zhang Zhijian, and Wu Gang. It depicts of a police officer's fight against organized crime over a period of 20 years, showing the rise and fall of underworld figures and corrupt officials. The show takes place in the fictional city of Jinghai, chronicling the 21-year feud between incorruptible policeman An Xin and fishmonger-turned-mobster Gao Qiqiang.

== Production ==
The name of The Knockout derives from a ci written by Mao Zedong in July 1930. Shooting began in October 2021 and ended in September 2022. Most of the TV series was shot on location in Jiangmen, Guangdong.

The Central Political and Legal Affairs Commission of the Central Committee of the Chinese Communist Party helped produce the show as part of its public education efforts for its "Education and Rectification Campaign of the Political-Legal Organizations," which aimed to curb corruption and extrajudicial interventions in the court system.

== Reception ==
It premiered in China via CCTV-8 and iQIYI starting January 14, 2023.

The Knockout is the top-rated TV series aired on CCTV-8 in the past nine years. It was one of the most watched shows of 2023.

== Cast ==
=== Main ===
Actor	Character	Introduction
Zhang Yi	An Xin (安欣)	Police officer of Shuangqiao Police Station (2000) → Police officer of Criminal Investigation Detachment of Jinghai Public Security Bureau (2000) → Leader of the First Team of the Criminal Investigation Detachment of Jinghai Public Security Bureau (2006) → Traffic Police of Jinghai Transportation Bureau (2006) → Chief of Archives Section of Jinghai Public Security Bureau (2008) → Chief of Publicity Section of Jinghai Public Security Bureau (2021) → Deputy leader of the Project Team of "Qiangsheng Group involved in Criminal Cases" (2021); Adopted son of An Changlin. He has an unrequited love with Meng Yu. In 2000, he met Gao Qiqiang and tracked down his criminal evidence for 20 years.
Zhang Songwen	Gao Qiqiang (高启强)	The sly but charismatic chief antagonist. In twenty years, Gao Qiqiang rose from a lowly fish seller being bullied by local mobsters to becoming the undisputed leader of the Jinghai underworld. Coercion, murder, and bribery was with him every step of the way. His control and influence extended to politics, construction, and education, while his more nefarious dealings were handled by his loyal lieutenants. Yet to the average bystander, he appeared to be a renowned businessman with a passion for philanthropy. Owner of a fish stall (2000) → Partner of Qiangsheng Xiaolingtong Store (2000) → General Manager of Jinghai Construction Engineering Group (2004) → Chairman of the Board of Directors of Jinghai Construction Engineering Group (2006) → Chairman of the Board of Directors of Qiangsheng Group and member of the Jinghai Municipal Committee of the Chinese People's Political Consultative Conference (2021); Elder brother of Gao Qisheng and Gao Qilan. Their parents died early. He married Chen Shuting in 2006 and has a stepson. He started out selling fish, then operated a mobile phone store, later recognized Uncle Tai as his godfather and joined Uncle Tai's Jinghai Construction Engineering Group, becoming a successful person in the business and political circles. He eventually was arrested and sentenced to death in 2021.
Li Yitong	Meng Yu (孟钰)	University student (2000) → Journalist (2006) → Wife of deputy director of Jinghai Power Supply Bureau (2014–21) → TV host (2021); Daughter of Meng Dehai. She has an unrequited love with An Xin. She met Yang Jian in 2006 and was married to him in 2014. They have a daughter.
Zhang Zhijian	Meng Dehai (孟德海)	Deputy mayor of Jinghai and director of the Public Security Bureau (2000) → Member of the Standing Committee of the CCP Jinghai Municipal Committee and party secretary of the CCP Qinghua District Committee (2000–06) → Chairman of the Standing Committee of Jinghai Municipal People's Congress (2021) → First-level chief staff member of Jinghai Municipal Government (2021); Father of Meng Yu and nephew of Old Huang. In his early years, he became comrade-in-arms with An Xin's biological father and An Changlin.
Wu Gang	Xu Zhong (徐忠)	Commissioner of Linjiang Provincial Special Group for Combating Crime and leader of the Provincial Education Rectification Stationary Guidance Group

=== Supporting ===
Characters around Gao Qiqiang

Actor	Character	Introduction
Su Xiaoding	Gao Qisheng (高启盛)	University student (2000) → Partner of Qiangsheng Xiaolingtong Store (2000); Brother of Gao Qiqiang and Gao Qilan. He became a wanted criminal for drug trafficking, and finally died with police captain Li Xiang.
Cheng Longni	Gao Qilan (高启兰)	University student (2000) → Surgeon after university Sister of Gao Qiqiang and Gao Qisheng. She has an unrequited love with An Xin for 20 years. Finally, she joined the African Medical Team.
Gao Ye	Chen Shuting (陈书婷)	Bai Jiangbo's wife (2000) → Bai Jiangbo's widow (2000) → Gao Qiqiang's wife (2006); Adopted daughter of Uncle Tai and mother of Bai Xiaochen/ Gao Xiaochen. She was killed in a car crash caused by Guo Shanfeng on the orders of Jiang Tian in 2015.
Ni Dahong	Chen Tai or Uncle Tai (陈泰（泰叔）)	Chairman of Jinghai Construction Engineering Group (2000–06); Godfather of Chen Shuting and Gao Qiqiang
Lin Jiachuan	Tang Xiaolong (唐小龙（刀哥）)	Local ruffian (2000) → Hatchet man of Gao Qiqiang (2006); Elder brother of Tang Xiaohu. He was eventually arrested and sentenced to death in 2021 for usury.
Sun Yan	Tang Xiaohu (唐小虎)	Local ruffian (2000) → Hatchet man of Gao Qiqiang (2000) → Second leader of Qiangsheng Group (2021); Younger brother of Tang Xiaolong. He was eventually killed by Jiang Tian for protecting Gao Qilan and Gao Xiaochen.
Feng Bing	Chen Jinmo or Old Mo (陈金默（老默）)	Prisoner (2000) → Owner of a fish stall (2000) → Profession killer of Gao Qiqiang (2000); Lover of Huang Cuicui. They have a daughter named Huang Yao. In 2006, he was ordered by his boss Gao Qiqiang to kill Li Hongwei and was killed in the hospital after a confrontation with police.
Yue Yang	Bai/ Gao Xiaochen (高晓晨（白晓晨）)	Bai Xiaochen (2000) → Gao Xiaochen (2006); Son of Chen Shuting and Bai Jiangbo and the stepson of Gao Qiqiang. Main suspect in the 228 Gun Case in 2014. Later served five years in prison for his crime.
Cheng Jinming	Huang Yao (黄瑶)	Student (2000) → Intern of Qiangsheng Group (2021); Daughter of Chen Jinmo and Huang Cuicui, and the stepdaughter of Gao Qiqiang.

Characters in Jinghai Public Security Bureau

Actor	Character	Introduction
Li Jian	Li Xiang (李响)	Police officer of Shuangqiao Police Station (2000) → Police officer of Criminal Investigation Detachment of Jinghai Public Security Bureau (2000) → Leader of Criminal Investigation Detachment of Jinghai Public Security Bureau (2006); A native of Mang Village, Li Qing's childhood playmate.
Hao Ping	Cao Chuang (曹闯)	Leader of Criminal Investigation Detachment of Jinghai Public Security Bureau (2000); Teacher of An Xin, Li Xiang and Zhang Biao. He was seduced by Zhao Lidong, being offered deputy director and became both corrupt and an informant, and was later killed by Chen Mo in the gunfight in 2000.
Zhao Zichong	Zhang Biao (张彪)	Leader of the Second Team of the Criminal Investigation Detachment of Jinghai Public Security Bureau (2006) → Leader of Criminal Investigation Detachment of Jinghai Public Security Bureau (2006–21); He eventually became an informant of Qiangsheng Group.
Ling Zhuo	Lu Han (陆寒)	Police officer of Criminal Investigation Detachment of Jinghai Public Security Bureau (2006–14); An Xin's apprentice. He was killed by Guo Shanfeng when investigating the 228 Gun Case in 2014.
Wang Xiao	Yang Jian (杨健)	Traffic Police of Jinghai Transportation Bureau (2000) → Leader of the Anti-Drug Detachment of Jinghai Public Security Bureau (2006) → Deputy director of Jinghai Power Supply Bureau (2014–21); Husband of Meng Yu. They have a daughter. In 2014, he became deputy director of Jinghai Power Supply Bureau under the support of Gao Qiqiang. In 2021, he was arrested and sentenced to 15 years in prison.
Shi Zhaoqi	An Changlin (安长林)	Executive deputy director of Jinghai Municipal Public Security Bureau (2000) → Director of Bobei Public Security Bureau (2000–06) → Member of the Standing Committee of the CCP Jinghai Municipal Committee and secretary of the Political and Legal Affairs Commission (2021); Foster father of An Xin.
Ning Xiaozhi	Guo Wenjian (郭文建)	Executive deputy director of Jinghai Municipal Public Security Bureau (2006)

Characters in Jinghai Municipal Party and Government Organs

Actor	Character	Introduction
Bao Dazhi	Zhao Lidong (赵立冬)	Member of the Standing Committee of the CCP Jinghai Municipal Committee and secretary of the Political and Legal Affairs Commission (2000) → Executive vice mayor of Jinghai (2006) → Deputy party secretary of the CCP Jinghai Municipal Committee and mayor of Jinghai (2021); Senior corrupt official in Jinghai, and was sentenced to death in 2021.
Cui Zhigang	Gong Kaijiang (龚开疆)	Deputy general manager of Jinghai Telecom Company (2000) → Deputy chief of Qinghua District (2006) → Vice chairman of the Jinghai Municipal Committee of the Chinese People's Political Consultative Conference (2021)
Ye Qishan	Tan Siyan (谭思言)	Staff member of the Research Office of Jinghai Municipal Government
Qin Yan	He Liming (何黎明)	Executive deputy secretary of Linjiang Provincial Political and Legal Affairs Commission
Zheng Jiabin	Secretary Wang (王秘书)	Secretary for Zhao Lidong
Li Jianyi	Ji Ze (纪泽)	Second-level inspector of Linjiang Provincial Discipline Inspection Commission and Linjiang Provincial Supervision Commission and deputy leader of the Guidance Group of the Linjiang Provincial Education Rectification Station
Zhan Jingyi	Fang Ning (方宁)	Cadre of the First Office of the Linjiang Provincial Discipline Inspection Commission and Linjiang Provincial Supervision Commission

Other characters

Actor	Character	Introduction
Jia Bing	Xu Jiang (徐江)	Owner of "Baijinhan Nightclub" and head of a gang. Bai Jiangbo's opponent. He was killed by Chen Jinmo.
Luo Eryang	Bai Jiangbo (白江波)	Husband of Chen Shuting and father of Bai Xiaochen. Head of a gang. He was killed by Xu Jiang in 2000.
Wang Peilu	Feng Dazhuang (冯大壮)	Nicknamed "Crazy Donkey"; A hatchet man of Xu Jiang.
Song Jiateng	Mazi (麻子)	He has a pockmarked face, so he nicknamed "Mazi". An undercover of An Xin.
Han Tongsheng	Li Youtian (李有田)	Secretary of the Party Branch of CCP Mang Village Committee and director of Mang Village. He was killed by Chen Jinmo.
A Runa	Li Hongwei (李宏伟)	Son of Li Youtian; He died in the hospital after being severely beaten by Gao Qisheng.
Wang Hong	Li Qing (李青)	A young man with autism. His father was killed by Chen Jinmo. Li Youtian and Li Hongwei took advantage of his disability and persuaded him to take revenge. He was killed by military police when he kidnapped Gao Xiaochen.
Qu Shanshan	Cheng Cheng (程程)	Assistant to the Chairman of Jinghai Construction Engineering Group (2006); She was killed by Chen Jinmo.
Shen Danping	Aunt Cui (崔姨)	Meng Dehai's wife and Meng Yu's mother.
Shu Yaoxuan	Huang Yanjun/ Old Huang (黄严军/老黄)	Uncle of Meng Dehai; Retired cadre of the Organization Department of the CCP Linjiang Provincial Committee.
Huo Qing	Zhou Zhihe (周志合)	Member of the Standing Committee of the CCP Linjiang Provincial Committee and secretary of the Political and Legal Commission (2021).
Zhao Da (actor)	Guo Shanfeng (过山峰)	A fellow villager of Jiang Tian. He is a killer of Zhao Lidong and Jiang Tian.
Zhao Longhao	Jiang Tian (蒋天)	Leader of Shahai Group (2014–21). A native of Hunan. Gao Qiqiang's sworn enemy.
Bian Yuan	Wang Li (王力)	Deputy chief engineer of Jinghai Power Supply Bureau. He was killed by Guo Shanfeng in 2021.

== Soundtrack ==
No.	Title	Lyrics	Music	Singer(s)	Length
1.	"Nowhere to Hide (藏无可藏)" (Ending theme)	Zhang Liang	Ren Shuai	Na Ying
