= 29th Golden Rooster Awards =

2013 Chinese film awards ceremony

The 29th Golden Rooster Awards honoring best Chinese language films which presents during 2012–13. Award ceremony was held in Wuhan, Hubei Province, hosted by Tu Jingwei, broadcast by CCTV-6 Movie Channel.

== Schedule ==
Time	Event
08/12/2013	First Ballot of nominees
08/28/2013	Announced the nominees
09/27/2013	Nominee Ceremony
09/28/2013	Award Ceremony

== Winners and nominees ==
Best Film	Best Director
The Story of Zhou Enlai; American Dreams in China; Back to 1942; Song of the Phoenix; A Simple Life; Fallen City	Peter Chan－American Dreams in China; Wang Jing－Feng Shui; Wong Kar-wai－The Grandmaster; Feng Xiaogang－Back to 1942
Best Directorial Debut	Best Low-budget Feature
Zhao Wei－So Young; Qu Jiangtao－A Grandson from America; Liu Haodong－Cobble; Du Jiayi－Kora; De Gena/Du Liang－Latitude 52	Feng Shui; Today and Tomorrow; China Liulaozhuang 82 Warriors; Latitude 52; Cobble
Best Original Screenplay	Best Adapted Screenplay
Huang Hong/Wang Jinming－Fallen City; Tian Yunzhang、Jia Yunzhang－The Story of Zhou Enlai; Qu Jiangtao－A Grandson from America; Zhou Zhiyong/Zhang Ji/Lin Aihua－American Dreams in China; Hu Yonghong－My Running Shadow	Liu Zhenyun－Back to 1942; Wu Nan－Feng Shui; Li Qiang－So Young
Best Actor	Best Actress
Zhang Guoli－Back to 1942; Huang Xiaoming－American Dreams in China; Sun Weimin－The Story of Zhou Enlai; Tao Zeru－Song of the Phoenix; Huang Jue－Fallen City	Song Jia－Falling Flowers; Yang Zishan－So Young; Zhang Jingchu－My Running Shadow; Liang Jing－Child of Stars; Zhang Ziyi－The Grandmaster; Yan Bingyan－Feng Shui
Best Supporting Actor	Best Supporting Actress
Wang Qingxiang－The Grandmaster; Ding Yongdai－Fallen City; Liu Jian－China Liulaozhuang 82 Warriors; Chen Yiheng－Xuhaifeng's Gun; Jiao Gang－Feng Shui	Wang Luodan－Caught in the Web; Li Lie－Touch of the Light; Du Juan－American Dreams in China; Chi Peng－Song of the Phoenix
Best Cinematography	Best Art Direction
Back to 1942－ Lu Yue; Woman at Feeding Period－Wang Dong、Ma Xiaobo; Fallen Flowers－Shi Luan; So Young－Li Ran; American Dreams in China－Christopher Doyle; Caught in the Web－[[[Yang Shu (cinematographer)|Yang Shu]]	The Grandmaster－Zhang Shuping、Qiu Weiming; Back to 1942－Shi Haiying; Fallen Flowers－Lu Feng; China Liulaozhuang 82 Warriors－Xu Feng; So Young－Li Yang
Best Music	Best Sound Recording
The Story of Zhou Enlai－Zhang Shaotong; Fallen City－Liu Sujun; Feng Shui－Yang Sili; Back to 1942－Zhao Jiping; So Young－Dou Peng	Back to 1942－Wu Jiang; Feng Shui－Wang Changrui; Song of the Phoenix－Wang Changrui; The Grandmaster－Chen Guang
Best Documentary	Best Popular Science Film
Chosin Reservoir; Finding Max; 仰望星空; 考鼓记; Du Fu; 奔腾年代	气候变化与粮食安全; 外来生物入侵; 生命奇观-胎儿的奇异旅程; Nature Code
Best Children Feature	Best Chinese Opera Film
The Running Shadow; Don' t Expect Praises; A Grandson from America; My Horse; Starry Starry night; Sunlight at Fingertips	兰梅记; Dream of the Red Chamber; Big Feet Queen; Jade Love; 铡刀下的红梅
Best Animation	
The Ultimate Task; Xi Baipo II: The Hero Wang Erxiao; Yugo & Lala; Cribug	

== Special awards ==
Lifetime Achievement Award

- Yu Min(Screenwriter)
- Liu Xuerao(Art Director)

Special Jury Award

- Film:Back to 1942
- Filmmaker: Wu Tianming
