= 31st Golden Rooster Awards =

2017 Chinese film awards ceremony

The 31st Golden Rooster Awards were held in Hohhot, Inner Mongolia, China, and broadcast by CCTV Movie Channel. Nominees and winners are listed below, winners are in bold.

I Am Not Madame Bovary was the biggest winner, receiving three awards, including Best Director, Best Actress and Best Supporting Actor. Saving Mr. Wu won two awards including Best Editing and Best Supporting Actor. Deng Chao won the Best Actor award and Fan Bingbing won the Best Actress award.

== Winners and nominees ==
Best Picture	Best Director
**Operation Mekong**; Soul Mate; Mr. Six; Battle of Xiangjiang River; I Am Not Madame Bovary	**Feng Xiaogang–I Am Not Madame Bovary**; Zheng Dasheng–Bangzi Melody; Cao Baoping–The Dead End; Cheng Er–The Wasted Times; Guan Hu–Mr. Six
Best Directorial Debut	Best Low-budget Feature
**Wen Zhang–When Larry Met Mary**; Song Haolin–Mr. Zhu’s Summer; Cao Guoxiang–Soul Mate	**A Mother's Story**; Goodbye; Tharlo; Crested Ibis; Relocate
Best Writing	Best Editing
**Guan Hu and Dong Runnian–Mr. Six**; Liu Zhenyun–I Am Not Madame Bovary; Li Baoluo–Bangzi Melody; Huang Dan, Feng Mengyao and Liang Shuang–Relocate	**Ding Sheng–Saving Mr. Wu**; Xu Hongyu, Li Dianshi, Tan Xiangyuan and Zhou Xiaolin–Soul Mate; Li Yongyi–The Dead End; Chen Qihe, Pan Xiongyao and Peng Zhengxi–To the Fore; Liao Qingsong and Song Bing–Tharlo
Best Actor	Best Actress
**Deng Chao–The Dead End**; Bao Bei'er–When Larry Met Mary; Feng Xiaogang–Mr. Six; Tu Men–Goodbye; Liao Fan–The Final Master	**Fan Bingbing–I Am Not Madame Bovary**; Bai Baihe–Monster Hunt; Yan Ni–Relocate; Song Jia–When Larry Met Mary; Zhou Dongyu–Soul Mate
Best Supporting Actor	Best Supporting Actress
**Yu Hewei–I Am Not Madame Bovary**; **Wang Qianyuan–Saving Mr. Wu**; Zhu Yawen–When Larry Met Mary; Sun Weimin–Battle of Xiangjiang River; Zhang Yi–Cock and Bull; Zhang Hui–Relocate	**Wu Yanshu–Relocate**; Ai Liya–Goodbye; Zhang Huijuan–Bangzi Melody; Jiang Wenli–The Final Master; Jiao Junyan–When Larry Met Mary
Best Cinematography	Best Art Direction
**Bangzi Melody–Shao Dan**; Saving Mr. Wu–Ding Yu; When Larry Met Mary–Shi Luan; Tharlo–Lü Songye; Xuanzang–Sun Ming; The Wasted Times–Du Jie	**The Wasted Times–Han Zhong**; Monster Hunt–Li Jianwei; Operation Mekong–Li Jianwei; Xuanzang–Wu Ming; The Medal Carved in Millstone–Cao Anjun
Best Music	Best Sound Recording
**Cairo Declaration–Ye Xiaogang**; Xuanzang–Wang Xiaofeng; A Paper Marriage–Liu Sijun; Mr. Six–Dou Peng	**Chongqing Hot Pot–Huang Zheng**; When Larry Met Mary–An Wei; Warrior–An Shaofeng; I Am Not Madame Bovary–Wu Jiang; The Wasted Times–Zhu Yanfeng; Xuanzang–Chao Jun
