= Golden Rooster Award for Best Supporting Actress =

Chinese Film Awards

Golden Rooster Awards for Best Supporting Actress
- Awarded for: Best Supporting Actress of the year
- Country: China
- Presented by: China Film Association; China Federation of Literary and Art Circles; Xiamen Municipal People's Government; 1905.com
- First award: 1981
- Final award: 2023
- Winner (2022): Qi Xi for Nice View
- Website: Golden Rooster Awards

Golden Rooster for Best Supporting Actress (Chinese: 中国电影金鸡奖最佳女配角) is the main competition category of the Golden Rooster Awards. It is awarded to supporting actresses who have outstanding performance in motion pictures.

== Winners & nominees ==
‡	Indicates winning Hundred Flowers Award for Best Supporting Actress for the same role

Year	Actress(es)	Film	Character
1981; 1st	Lin Bin	Evening Rain	Liu Wenying
1981; 1st	Mao Weihui	Evening Rain	
1981; 1st	Ouyang Ruqiu	Evening Rain	
1982	He Xiaoshu	Corner Left Unnoticed by Love	
1982	Wang Lihua	Female Soldiers	
1982	Wang Yumei	In Laws	
1982	Zhang Jinling	Xu Mao and His Daughters	
1983	Zheng Zhenyao	My Memories of Old Beijing	
1983	Yin Xin	Camel Xiangzi	
1984	Song Xiaoying	Ward 16	
1984	Ding Yi	Zan Men De Niu Bai Sui	
1984	Wang Fuli	Zan Men De Niu Bai Sui	
1985	Ding Yi	Girl from Mt. Huangshan	
1985	Wang Yumei	Tan Sitong	Empress Dowager Cixi
1985	Gai Ke	Wreaths at the Foot of the Mountain	
1986	Wang Fuli	Sunrise	
1987	Ding Jiali	The First Women In The Forests	
1987	Xu Ning	Hibiscus Town	
1988	Lü Liping‡	Old Well‡	
1988	Song Chunli	Mandarin Duck Mansion	
1988	Song Xiaoying	Mandarin Duck Mansion	
1989	N/A		
1989	Ma Xiaoqing	The Trouble Shooter	
1990; 10th	Lin Moyu‡	A Dream of Red Mansions‡	Grandmother Jia
1990; 10th	Duan Xiu	Ballad of the Yellow River	Honghua
1991	N/A		
1992	Ding Jiali	Spring Festival	
1992	Wang Yumei	Xin Xiang	
1992	Ma Ling	The Weddings	
1993	Zhang Liwei	Ren Zhi Chu	
1993	Fu Lili	Stand Up, Don't Bend Over	
1994	N/A		
1994	Ding Jiali	No More Applause	
1995	Ju Xue	Gone Forever with My Love	
1996; 16th	Zheng Weili	Brother Wu Invites God	Shuishui
1996; 16th	Jiang Yao	Yang Kaihui & Kong Fansen	
1997; 17th	Ma Xiaoqing	I Have a Dad	head nurse
1997; 17th	Wu Hao	Young Girl's Red Hairpin	Liu Sha
1997; 17th	Zhang Yan	After Divorce	Shi Hong
1998; 18th	Bai Xueyun	Live in Peace and Contentment	Shanmei
1998; 18th	Lü Liping	Spicy Love Soup	boy's mother
1998; 18th	Shi Lan	Passionate Defence	Lin Xiaoguang
1999; 19th	Yuan Quan	Rhapsody of Spring	Zhou Xiaomei
1999; 19th	Yi Chunde	The National Anthem	Lin Xueli
2000; 20th	Chen Jin	Soaring Across the Sky	Wang Ruhui
2000; 20th	Xu Fan	Sigh	Song Xiaoying
2001; 21st	Peng Yu	The Full Moon	Liu Niang
2001; 21st	Li Xiaomeng	Who Cares?	Xiaowen
2002; 22nd	Yuan Quan‡	Pretty Big Feet‡	Xia Yu
2002; 22nd	Zhou Li	Frequency for Victory	Yin Jiaru
2003; 23rd	Xu Jinglei	Far from Home	Xue'er
2003; 23rd	Chen Xiaoyi	The Parking Attendant in July	Song
2003; 23rd	Liang Jing	The Law of Romance	Geng Lele
2003; 23rd	Sa Rina	Father	sister
2004	N/A		
2004	Ai Liya	The Way to School	
2004	Fan Bingbing	Cell Phone	
2004	Qi Huan	The Foliage	
2004	Shen Huifen	Profoundly Affecting	
2005; 25th	Huang Meiying	Peacock	mother
2005; 25th	Gong Zhe	You and Me	Xiaoma
2005; 25th	Li Kechun	Dam Street	Teacher Su
2005; 25th	Song Xiaoying	A Time to Love	Hou Jia's mother
2007; 26th	Xiao Xiangyu	One Foot Off the Ground	Dahong
2007; 26th	Karen Mok	Mr. Cinema	Luk Min
2007; 26th	Song Jia	Curiosity Kills the Cat	Liang Xiaoxia
2007; 26th	Zhou Xun	The Banquet	Qing
2009; 27th	Yue Hong	A Tale of Two Donkeys	Dalian
2009; 27th	Cao Cuifen	Six Sisters in the War	Stinking Granny
2009; 27th	Dong Xuan	And the Spring Comes	Teacher Zhang
2009; 27th	Jiang Hongbo	Looking for Jackie	policewoman
2009; 27th	Sun Li	Painted Skin	Xia Bing
2011; 28th	Guo Ge	Through Stunning Storms	Guifang
2011; 28th	Jiang Qinqin	The Sun	Yingtao
2011; 28th	Jiang Ruijia	Shenzhou 11	Zhang Siyu
2011; 28th	Li Bin	City Monkey	Bai Shuzhen
2011; 28th	Zeinep Alimtay	An Eternal Lamb	Sarah
2011; 28th	Zhang Jingchu	Aftershock	Wang Deng
2013; 29th	Wang Luodan	Caught in the Web	Yang Jiaqi
2013; 29th	Lee Lieh	Touch of the Light	Mei-hsiang
2013; 29th	Du Juan	American Dreams in China	Su Mei
2013; 29th	Chi Peng	Song of the Phoenix	Jiao San's wife
2015; 30th	Deng Jiajia	Silent Witness	Lin Mengmeng
2015; 30th	Chen Jin	A Noble Spirit	Yingcuo Juemu
2015; 30th	Ding Jiali	The Golden Era	Xu Guangping
2015; 30th	Mei Ting	Blind Massage	Duhong
2015; 30th	Zhang Huiwen	Coming Home	Dandan
2017; 31st	Wu Yanshu	Relocate	Old Mrs. Ma
2017; 31st	Ai Liya	A Simple Goodbye	Mother
2017; 31st	Zhang Huijuan	Bangzi Melody	Lu Xiaofang
2017; 31st	Jiang Wenli	The Final Master	Master Zou
2017; 31st	Jiao Junyan	When Larry Met Mary	Fang Huihui
2019; 32nd	Wu Yufang	Send Me to the Clouds	Liang Meizhi
2019; 32nd	Jiang Luxia	Operation Red Sea	Tong Li
2019; 32nd	Xu Xing	If You Are Happy	Aunt Niu
2019; 32nd	Kalbinur Rahmati	A First Farewell	Kalbinur
2020; 33rd	Yuan Quan‡	The Captain‡	Bi Nan
2020; 33rd	Zhao Haiyan	Almost a Comedy	Sun Tong's mother
2020; 33rd	Zhang Xiran	Sheep Without a Shepherd	An-an
2020; 33rd	Zhou Ye	Better Days	Wei Lai
2021; 34th	Zhu Yuanyuan‡	Sister‡	An Rongrong
2021; 34th	Ding Liuyuan	My Father, Jiao Yulu	Xu Junya
2021; 34th	Liu Jia	Hi, Mom	Li Huanying (middle-aged)
2021; 34th	Sonam Wangmo	Gone With The Wind	Sang Dan
2021; 34th	Zhou Ye	1921	Yang Kaihui
2022; 35th	Qi Xi	Nice View	Wang Chunmei
2022; 35th	Wu Yue	Myth of Love	Beibei
2022; 35th	Liu Dan	Upcoming Summer	class teacher
2022; 35th	Yu Hui	A Man of the People	Zhuo Lin
2022; 35th	Kan Xin	The Chanting Willows	Yin Xin
2023; 36th	Huang Miyi	Ripples of Life	Xiao Gu
2023; 36th	Cecilia Yip	Love Never Ends	Zhao Huanxin
2023; 36th	Wan Qian	Study Dad	Huo's sister-in-law
2023; 36th	Wang Shengdi	Keep You Safe	Wei Moli
2023; 36th	Yuan Quan	Creation of the Gods I: Kingdom of Storms	Queen Jiang
2024; 37th	Liu Dan	Gone with the Boat	Su Nianzhen
2024; 37th	Yue Hong	G for Gap	Jiang Meiling
2024; 37th	Zhao Liying	Article 20	Hao Xiuping
2024; 37th	Xu Fan	Viva La Vida	Tao Yi
2024; 37th	Guo Yuke	Another Day of Hope	Xu Xiaoxia
2025; 38th	Zhong Chuxi	Her Story	Xiao Ye
2025; 38th	Song Xiaoying	Dreaming of Mother and Home	Zheng Danzhu
2025; 38th	Huang Ziqi	A Song Sung Blue	Jin Mingmei
2025; 38th	Jiang Qinqin	Big World	Chen Lu
2025; 38th	Kara Wai	Dumpling Queen	Sister Hong
