= List of awards and nominations received by Zhang Ziyi =

This is a list of awards and nominations received by Chinese actress Zhang Ziyi.

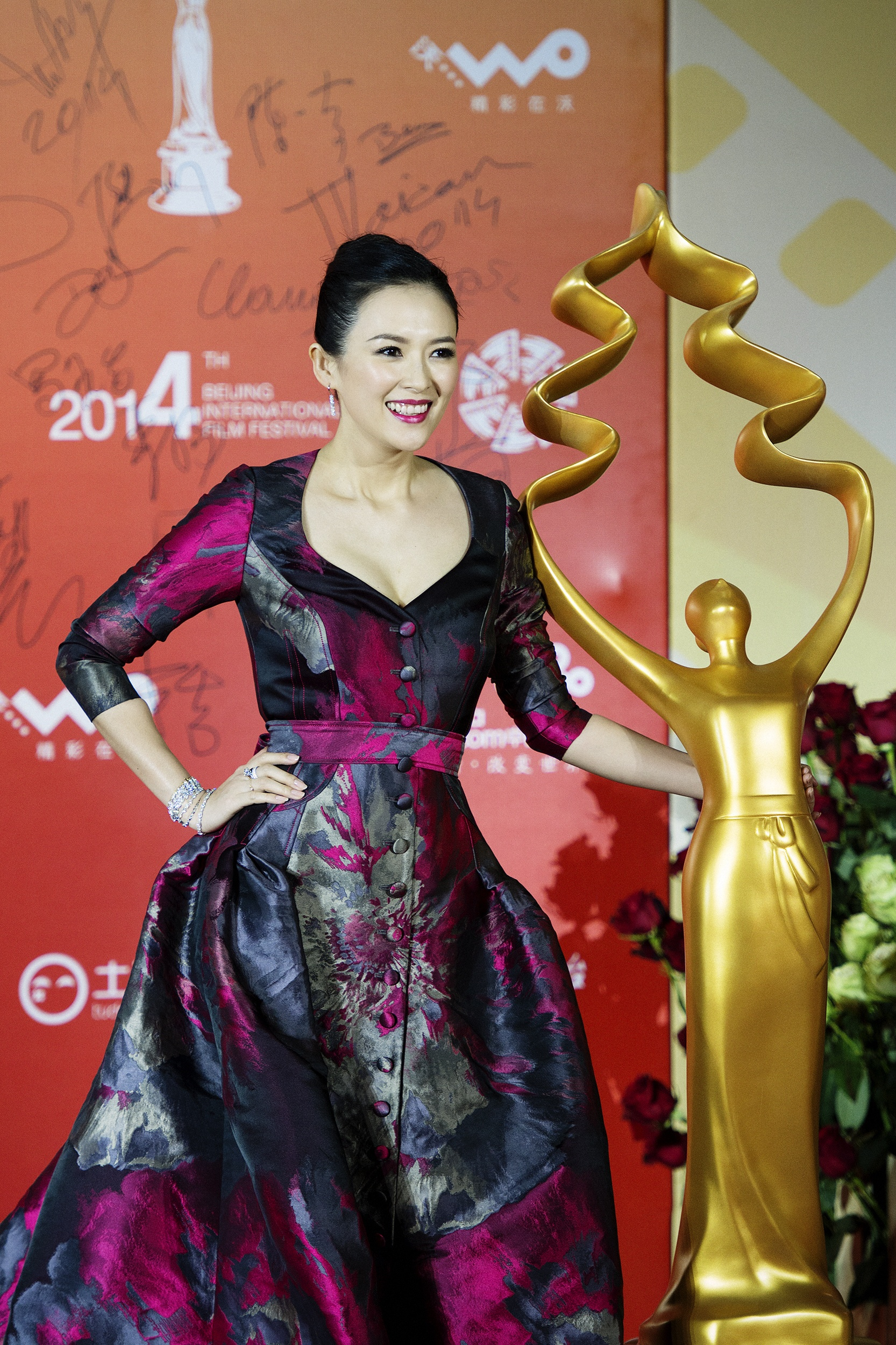
Zhang at the Beijing International Film Festival Closing Ceremony Red Carpet in 2014

== China region ==
=== Beijing College Student Film Festival ===
Year	Award	Category	Nominated work	Result	Ref.
2012	19th	Best Actress	Love for Life	Nominated	
2013	20th	Best Actress	The Grandmaster	Nominated	

=== Beijing International Film Festival ===
Year	Award	Category	Nominated work	Result	Ref.
2014	4th	Best Actress	The Grandmaster	Won	

=== Changchun Film Festival ===
Year	Award	Category	Nominated work	Result	Ref.
2005	7th	Best Actress	Jasmine Women	Nominated	
2018	14th	Best Actress	The Wasted Times	Won	

=== China Film Director's Guild Awards ===
Year	Award	Category	Nominated work	Result	Ref.
2005	1st	Best Actress	House of Flying Daggers	Nominated	
2012	3rd	Best Actress	Love for Life	Won	
2017	8th	Best Actress	The Wasted Times	Nominated	

=== Chinese Film Media Awards ===
Year	Award	Category	Nominated work	Result	Ref.
2004	4th	Best Actress	Purple Butterfly	Won	
2005	5th	Best Actress	2046	Nominated	
2014	14th	Best Actress	The Grandmaster	Won	
2017	17th	Best Actress	The Wasted Times	Nominated	

=== Chunyan Awards ===
Year	Award	Category	Nominated work	Result	Ref.
2013	7th	Best Film Actress	Love for Life	Won	

=== Golden Broom Awards ===
Year	Award	Category	Nominated work	Result	Ref.
2012	4th	Most Disappointing Actress	Dangerous Liaisons	Nominated	

=== Golden Rooster Awards ===
Year	Award	Category	Nominated work	Result	Ref.
2000	20th	Best Actress	The Road Home	Nominated	
2004	24th	Best Actress	Jasmine Women	Won	
2009	27th	Best Actress	Forever Enthralled	Nominated	
2013	29th	Best Actress	The Grandmaster	Nominated	

=== Guangzhou Student Film Festival ===
Year	Award	Category	Nominated work	Result	Ref.
2010	7th	Best Actress	Sophie's Revenge	Nominated	
2018	15th	Best Actress	Forever Young	Nominated	

=== Huabiao Awards ===
Year	Award	Category	Nominated work	Result	Ref.
2004	10th	Outstanding Actress	Jasmine Women	Nominated	
2005	11th	Outstanding Actress	House of Flying Daggers	Won	
2009	13th	Outstanding Actress	Forever Enthralled	Won	
2013	15th	Outstanding Actress	The Grandmaster	Won	

=== Hundred Flowers Awards ===
Year	Award	Category	Nominated work	Result	Ref.
2000	23rd	Best Actress	The Road Home	Won	
2006	28th	Best Actress	House of Flying Daggers	Nominated	
2014	32nd	Best Actress	The Grandmaster	Won	
2020	35th	Best Actress	The Climbers	Nominated	

=== Huading Awards ===
Year	Award	Category	Nominated work	Result	Ref.
2009	3rd	Best Actress	Forever Enthralled	Nominated	
2011	5th	Film Achievement Award	Love for Life	Won	
2013	10th	Best Chinese Film Actress	The Grandmaster	Won	
2019	25th	Best Actress	Forever Young	Nominated	
2022	33rd	Best New Director	My Country, My Parents	Nominated	

=== Iron Elephant Film Awards ===
Year	Award	Category	Nominated work	Result	Ref.
2009	2nd	Best Supporting Actress	Forever Enthralled	Won	
2010	3rd	Best Actress	Sophie's Revenge	Nominated	

=== Macau International Movie Festival ===
Year	Award	Category	Nominated work	Result	Ref.
2017	9th	Best Actress	The Wasted Times	Won	
2018	10th	Best Actress	Forever Young	Won	
2022	14th	Best Director	My Country, My Parents	Won	
2022	14th	Best Actress	My Country, My Parents	Won	
2025	17th	Best Actress	She's Got No Name	Won	

=== Shanghai Film Critics Awards ===
Year	Award	Category	Nominated work	Result	Ref.
2011	20th	Best Actress	Love for Life	Won	

== Asian region ==
=== Asian Film Awards ===
Year	Award	Category	Nominated work	Result	Ref.
2007	1st	Best Actress	The Banquet	Nominated	
2014	8th	Best Actress	The Grandmaster	Won	

=== Asian Film Critics Association Awards ===
Year	Award	Category	Nominated work	Result	Ref.
2001	3rd	Best Supporting Actress	Crouching Tiger, Hidden Dragon	Won	
2014	16th	Best Actress	The Grandmaster	Won	

=== Asia-Pacific Film Festival ===
Year	Award	Category	Nominated work	Result	Ref.
2013	56th	Best Actress	The Grandmaster	Won	

=== Asia Pacific Screen Awards ===
Year	Award	Category	Nominated work	Result	Ref.
2013	7th	Best Actress	The Grandmaster	Won	

== Hong Kong and Taiwan region ==
=== Golden Bauhinia Awards ===
Year	Award	Category	Nominated work	Result	Ref.
2001	6th	Best Supporting Actress	Crouching Tiger, Hidden Dragon	Won	
2003	8th	Best Supporting Actress	Hero	Nominated	

=== Golden Horse Film Festival and Awards ===
Year	Award	Category	Nominated work	Result	Ref.
2000	37th	Best Actress	Crouching Tiger, Hidden Dragon	Nominated	
2004	41st	Best Actress	2046	Nominated	
2009	46th	Best Supporting Actress	Forever Enthralled	Nominated	
2013	50th	Best Actress	The Grandmaster	Won	

=== Hong Kong Film Awards ===
Year	Award	Category	Nominated work	Result	Ref.
2001	20th	Best Actress	Crouching Tiger, Hidden Dragon	Nominated	
2003	22nd	Best Supporting Actress	Hero	Nominated	
2005	24th	Best Actress	2046	Won	
2014	33rd	Best Actress	The Grandmaster	Won	
2026	44th	Best Actress	She's Got No Name	Nominated	

=== Hong Kong Film Critics Society Awards ===
Year	Award	Category	Nominated work	Result	Ref.
2005	11th	Best Actress	2046	Won	
2014	20th	Best Actress	The Grandmaster	Won	
2026	32nd	Best Actress	She's Got No Name	Nominated	

=== Hong Kong Film Directors' Guild Awards ===
Year	Award	Category	Nominated work	Result	Ref.
2014	15th	Best Actress	The Grandmaster	Won	

=== Hong Kong Screenwriters' Guild Awards ===
Year	Award	Category	Nominated work	Result	Ref.
2026		Best Movie Character of the Year	She's Got No Name	Won	

=== Hong Kong Society of Cinematographers (HKSC) Awards ===
Year	Award	Category	Nominated work	Result	Ref.
2014	15th	Most Charismatic Actress	The Grandmaster	Won	

== Western region ==
=== British Academy Film Awards ===
Year	Award	Category	Nominated work	Result	Ref.
2000	54th	Best Supporting Actress	Crouching Tiger, Hidden Dragon	Nominated	
2004	58th	Best Actress	House of Flying Daggers	Nominated	
2005	59th	Best Actress	Memoirs of a Geisha	Nominated	

=== Chicago Film Critics Association ===
Year	Award	Category	Nominated work	Result	Ref.
2000	13th	Most Promising Actress	Crouching Tiger, Hidden Dragon	Won	

=== Golden Globe Awards ===
Year	Award	Category	Nominated work	Result	Ref.
2005	63rd	Best Actress – Drama	Memoirs of a Geisha	Nominated	

=== Independent Spirit Awards ===
Year	Award	Category	Nominated work	Result	Ref.
2000	16th	Best Supporting Female	Crouching Tiger, Hidden Dragon	Won	

=== Kids Choice Awards ===
Year	Award	Category	Nominated work	Result	Ref.
2002		Favorite Female Butt Kicker	Rush Hour 2	Nominated	

=== MTV Movie Awards ===
Year	Award	Category	Nominated work	Result	Ref.
2001		Breakthrough Female Performance	Crouching Tiger, Hidden Dragon	Nominated	
2001		Best Fight	Crouching Tiger, Hidden Dragon	Won	
2002		Best Villain	Rush Hour 2	Nominated	
2005		Best Fight	House of Flying Daggers	Nominated	
2006		Sexiest Performance	Memoirs of a Geisha	Nominated	

=== NAACP Image Awards ===
Year	Award	Category	Nominated work	Result	Ref.
2006	38th	Outstanding Actress in a Motion Picture	Memoirs of a Geisha	Nominated	

=== National Society of Film Critics Awards ===
Year	Award	Category	Nominated work	Result	Ref.
2005		Best Supporting Actress	2046	Nominated	

=== Online Film Critics Society Awards ===
Year	Award	Category	Nominated work	Result	Ref.
2000	4th	Best Supporting Actress	Crouching Tiger, Hidden Dragon	Nominated	

=== Saturn Awards ===
Year	Award	Category	Nominated work	Result	Ref.
2000	27th	Best Supporting Actress	Crouching Tiger, Hidden Dragon	Nominated	
2004	31st	Best Actress	House of Flying Daggers	Nominated	

=== Satellite Awards ===
Year	Award	Category	Nominated work	Result	Ref.
2005	9th	Best Actress – Drama	Memoirs of a Geisha	Nominated	

=== Screen Actors Guild Awards ===
Year	Award	Category	Nominated work	Result	Ref.
2005	12th	Outstanding Performance by a Female Actor in a Leading Role	Memoirs of a Geisha	Nominated	

=== Teen Choice Awards ===
Year	Award	Category	Nominated work	Result	Ref.
2001		Film — Choice Breakout Performance	Crouching Tiger, Hidden Dragon	Nominated	

=== Toronto Film Critics Association Awards ===
Year	Award	Category	Nominated work	Result	Ref.
2000	4th	Best Supporting Actress	Crouching Tiger, Hidden Dragon	Won	

=== Young Artist Award ===
Year	Award	Category	Nominated work	Result	Ref.
2001	22nd	Best Young Actress in an International Film	Crouching Tiger, Hidden Dragon	Won	
