= 32nd Hundred Flowers Awards =

Chinese film awards ceremony in 2014

The 32nd Hundred Flowers Awards was a ceremony held on September 27, 2014 in Lanzhou, Gansu province. The nominees were announced on August 23.

== Awards and nominations ==
=== Best Film ===
Winner	Winning film	Nominees
N/A	The Grandmaster	* Runner-up: American Dreams in China * Runner-up: The Story of Zhou Enlai * So Young * Finding Mr. Right

=== Best Director ===
Winner	Winning film	Nominees
Zhao Wei	So Young	* Wong Kar-wai for The Grandmaster * Peter Chan for American Dreams in China * Chen Li for The Story of Zhou Enlai * Xue Xiaolu for Finding Mr. Right

=== Best Screenplay ===
Winner	Winning film	Nominees
Li Qiang	So Young	* Zou Jingzhi/Xu Haofeng/Wong Kar-wai for The Grandmaster * Zhou Zhiyong/Zhang Ji/Lin Aihua for American Dreams in China * Tian Yunzhang/Wu Baoan for The Story of Zhou Enlai * Xue Xiaolu for Finding Mr. Right

=== Best Actor ===
Winner	Winning film	Nominees
Huang Xiaoming	American Dreams in China	* Wu Xiubo for Finding Mr. Right * Nick Cheung for The White Storm * Jackie Chan for CZ12 * Xu Zheng for Lost in Thailand

=== Best Actress ===
Winner	Winning film	Nominees
Zhang Ziyi	The Grandmaster	* Yang Zishan for So Young * Tang Wei for Finding Mr. Right * Yao Xingtong for CZ12 * Yu Nan for Silent Witness

=== Best Supporting Actor ===
Winner	Winning film	Nominees
Tong Dawei	American Dreams in China	* Zhang Jin for The Grandmaster * Han Geng for So Young * Bao Bei'er for So Young * He Wei for The Story of Zhou Enlai

=== Best Supporting Actress ===
Winner	Winning film	Nominees
Deng Jiajia	Silent Witness	* Hai Qing for Finding Mr. Right * Yuan Quan for The White Storm * Tao Hong for Lost in Thailand * Charlie Young for Cold War
