= 10th Golden Rooster Awards =

1990 Chinese film awards ceremony

The 10th Golden Rooster Awards honoring the best in film of 1990, was given in Hongshan Gymnasium, Wuchang, Hubei Province, December 10, 1990.

== Winners & nominees ==
Best Film	Best Director
Founding Ceremony (Jue zhan zhi hou); Oh! Sweet Snow	Li Qiankuan/Xiao Guiyun－Founding Ceremony; Xie Tieli/Zhao Yun－The Dream Of Red Mansion; Chen Jialin－Baise Uprising
Best Directorial Debut	Best Writing
Huang Jun－Childhood in Ruijin	Zhang Tianmin/Zhang Xiaotian/Liu Xing/Guo Chen－Founding Ceremony
Best Actor	Best Actress
Lu Qi－Baise Uprising; Gu Yue－Founding Ceremony; Qi Mengshi－Long Yun and Jiang Jieshi	N/A
Best Supporting Actor	Best Supporting Actress
Sun Feihu－Founding Ceremony; Liang Tian－Black Snow	Lin Moyu－The Dream Of Red Mansion; Duan Xiu－Ballad of the Yellow River
Best Children Film	Best Documentary
豆蔻年华; The Private Teaching Company	情系巴山; 人类的抉择
Best Animation	Best Popular Science Film
N/A; The tall wife and her midget husband; 牛冤; 奇异的蒙古马	脑海; 紧凑型高产玉米; 全息胚——生物科学的新发现
Best Chinese Opera Film	Best Editing
N/A	Founding Ceremony－Wu Fanghai; Baise Uprising－Wu Guangcan; Black Snow－Zhao Qinian
Best Cinematography	Best Art Direction
Oh! Sweet Snow－Li Chensheng; Spacious Courtyard－Zhao Junhong; Ballad of the Yellow River－Zhi Lei	The Dream Of Red Mansion－Chen Yiyun/Yang Zhanjia; Business－Zhang Zhichu; Ballad of the Yellow River－Yang Gang/Chen Xin
Best Music	Best Sound Recording
Spacious Courtyard－Yang Mao; Ballad of the Yellow River－Chang Yuhong	Spacious Courtyard－Feng Deyao; Founding Ceremony－Li ZhenDUO
Best Costume Design	Best Make Up
The Dream Of Red Mansion－Xia Yayi/Zhao Ruhua/Zhang Xuan/Hong Jun/Liu Huiping/Jiang Jinming	N/A; Founding Ceremony－Guo Zhen/Liu Huan/Liu Xiaohong; The Dream Of Red Mansion－Wang Xizhong/Fan Qingshan/Liu Dan/Du Yongxiu/Xu Guangrui
Best Property	
N/A; The Dream Of Red Mansion－Yang Yunmin	
