= List of 2013 box office number-one films in China =

This is a list of 2013 box office number-one films in China (only Mainland China).

== Number-one films ==
| † | This implies the highest-grossing movie of the year. |

| Week | Date | Film | Gross in USD | Notes |
|---|---|---|---|---|
| 1 | January 6, 2013 | CZ12 | $37.32 million | |
| 2 | January 13, 2013 | The Grandmaster | $25.78 million | |
| 3 | January 20, 2013 | The Grandmaster | $13.72 million | |
| 4 | January 27, 2013 | Skyfall | $34.23 million | |
| 5 | February 3, 2013 | Skyfall | $15.98 million | |
| 6 | February 10, 2013 | Journey to the West: Conquering the Demons † | $12.68 million | |
| 7 | February 17, 2013 | Journey to the West: Conquering the Demons † | $92.46 million | |
| 8 | February 24, 2013 | Journey to the West: Conquering the Demons † | $54.12 million | |
| 9 | March 3, 2013 | Journey to the West: Conquering the Demons † | $23.10 million | |
| 10 | March 10, 2013 | Journey to the West: Conquering the Demons † | $10.19 million | |
| 11 | March 17, 2013 | A Good Day to Die Hard | $16.06 million | |
| 12 | March 24, 2013 | Finding Mr. Right | $12.15 million | |
| 13 | March 31, 2013 | Finding Mr. Right | $26.86 million | |
| 14 | April 7, 2013 | Finding Mr. Right | $23.57 million | |
| 15 | April 14, 2013 | Finding Mr. Right | $12.03 million | |
| 16 | April 21, 2013 | G.I. Joe: Retaliation | $33.53 million | |
| 17 | April 28, 2013 | So Young | $22.98 million | |
| 18 | May 5, 2013 | Iron Man 3 | $64.50 million | |
| 19 | May 12, 2013 | Iron Man 3 | $32.96 million | |
| 20 | May 19, 2013 | American Dreams in China | $17.22 million | |
| 21 | May 26, 2013 | American Dreams in China | $33.61 million | |
| 22 | June 2, 2013 | Star Trek Into Darkness | $26.04 million | |
| 23 | June 9, 2013 | Star Trek Into Darkness | $12.79 million | |
| 24 | June 16, 2013 | Switch | $33.11 million | |
| 25 | June 23, 2013 | Man of Steel | $26.08 million | |
| 26 | June 30, 2013 | Tiny Times | $43.27 million | |
| 27 | July 7, 2013 | Tiny Times | $24.68 million | |
| 28 | July 14, 2013 | After Earth | $14.18 million | |
| 29 | July 21, 2013 | After Earth | $16.51 million | |
| 30 | July 28, 2013 | Fast & Furious 6 | $29.67 million | |
| 31 | August 4, 2013 | Pacific Rim | $45.89 million | |
| 32 | August 11, 2013 | Pacific Rim | $34.02 million | |
| 33 | August 18, 2013 | Pacific Rim | $23.68 million | |
| 34 | August 25, 2013 | Jurassic Park 3D | $32.50 million | |
| 35 | September 1, 2013 | Jurassic Park 3D | $17.20 million | |
| 36 | September 8, 2013 | Elysium | $12.08 million | |
| 37 | September 15, 2013 | The Smurfs 2 | $10.07 million | |
| 38 | September 22, 2013 | My Lucky Star | $13.69 million | |
| 39 | September 29, 2013 | Young Detective Dee: Rise of the Sea Dragon | $15.23 million | |
| 40 | October 6, 2013 | Young Detective Dee: Rise of the Sea Dragon | $56.54 million | |
| 41 | October 13, 2013 | Young Detective Dee: Rise of the Sea Dragon | $16.90 million | |
| 42 | October 20, 2013 | The Wolverine | $18.56 million | |
| 43 | October 27, 2013 | The Wolverine | $14.63 million | |
| 44 | November 3, 2013 | Stalingrad | $8.36 million | |
| 45 | November 10, 2013 | Thor: The Dark World | $21.33 million | |
| 46 | November 17, 2013 | Thor: The Dark World | $25.11 million | |
| 47 | November 24, 2013 | Gravity | $35.98 million | |
| 48 | December 1, 2013 | Gravity | $22.93 million | |
| 49 | December 8, 2013 | No Man's Land | $22.28 million | |
| 50 | December 15, 2013 | Firestorm | $27.30 million | |
| 51 | December 22, 2013 | Personal Tailor | $52.51 million | |
| 52 | December 29, 2013 | Police Story 2013 | $45.34 million | |

== See also ==
- List of Chinese films of 2013
