= Song of the Phoenix =

2013 Chinese historical drama film by Wu Tianming

- Poster Illustration: Dong Qiu
- Chinese: 百鸟朝凤
- Directed by: Wu Tianming
- Written by: Wu Tianming; Xiao Jianghong; Luo Xueying
- Produced by: Wu Tianming
- Starring: Tao Zeru
- Cinematography: Wang Tianlin
- Edited by: Wang Peng
- Music by: Zhang Dalong
- Production companies: Xi'an Qujiang Dreamgarden Pictures; Shanxi Jinghaoze Film&TV Culture; Beijing Laolei Pictures; Beijing Juhe Yinglian Media; Beijing Dongfang Tianming Media; Beijing Qitai Yuanyang Media; Xi'an Qujiang Film&TV Investment Group
- Distributed by: Beijing Juhe Yinglian Media
- Release dates: September 25, 2013 (Golden Rooster Awards); May 6, 2016 (China)
- Running time: 110 minutes
- Country: China
- Language: Mandarin
- Box office: CN¥85.2 million

Song of the Phoenix is a 2013 Chinese art house drama film directed by Wu Tianming. It was released in China by Beijing Juhe Yinglian Media on May 6, 2016.

== Plot ==
In a Wushuang village, Shaanxi province, a young boy named You Tianming (Zheng Wei) begins to learn suona with Master Jiao (Tao Zeru). He and a fellow student, Lanyu (Hu Xianxu), dream of playing in Master Jiao's ensemble, which goes on tour throughout the Wushuang villages for wedding and funeral performances.

Master Jiao announces that he will soon retire, and he chooses Tianming as his successor. Jiao teaches Tianming the suona knowledge passed from teacher to student over the centuries. Tianming also learns the "Song of the Phoenix", a celebrated piece of music played only at funerals of the most renowned individuals.

When Tianming grows up (Li Mincheng), he becomes principal of the suona ensemble, but he finds the popularity of traditional Chinese music waning. The respect due to the suona musicians is no longer shown, and he is called to fewer and fewer gigs. To his anger, the use of suona is being replaced with the "modern" instruments of the West.

The company begins to disband as the ensemble's members must face reality and find work elsewhere to make ends meet. Master Jiao urges Tianming to continue the tradition of the suona ensemble, although he himself is compromised by a diagnosis of terminal lung cancer.

An official from the government arrives to ask Tianming to make a recording with his ensemble to preserve the culture of this dying art form. However, the few remaining members of the ensemble are unable to play, as they have sustained injuries from labour in factories. Lanyu suggests that Tianming also abandon life in the village and find work in the city. But Tianming remains devout to his teacher's greatest wish.

Upon Master Jiao's death, Tianming plays the "Song of the Phoenix" at the tombstone, alone.

== Cast ==
- Tao Zeru
- Li Mincheng
- Ji Bo
- Zheng Wei
- Hu Xianxu
- Chi Peng
- Yuan Zhongfang
- Mo Yang
- Zhang Xiqian
- Tan Qun
- Wang Changling
- Zhou Tianyu
- Zhang Shuangcheng
- Xu Huanshan
- Wang Fang

== Early difficulties in obtaining screenings ==
In the first few days following the May 6, 2016 release of Song of the Phoenix, very few showings of the film were scheduled for theaters in China (with more mainstream U.S.-produced films taking precedence), resulting in a poor box office performance. On May 12, producer Fang Li (方励) took the unprecedented step of kowtowing on Weibo, pleading for theater owners across China to increase the number of showings of Song of the Phoenix. After this, the scheduling was improved, and the film's box office performance also greatly improved. On May 26, the film successfully applied for an extension of the validity period of the film's release key to July 6. The final box office total was 86.9 million yuan.

== Reception ==
The film has grossed CN¥85.2 million at the Chinese box office.

Award	Category	Nominee	Result	Ref.
29th Golden Rooster Awards	Best Film	Song of the Phoenix	Nominated	
29th Golden Rooster Awards	Special Jury Award	Wu Tianming	Won	
29th Golden Rooster Awards	Best Actor	Tao Zeru	Nominated	
29th Golden Rooster Awards	Best Supporting Actress	Chi Peng	Nominated	
29th Golden Rooster Awards	Best Sound Recording	Wang Changhui	Nominated	
34th Hundred Flowers Awards	Best Picture	Song of the Phoenix	Pending	
34th Hundred Flowers Awards	Best Actor	Tao Zeru	Pending	
34th Hundred Flowers Awards	Best Supporting Actor	Li Mincheng	Pending	
