= Golden Rooster Award for Best Actor =

Chinese Film Awards

Golden Rooster Awards for Best Actor
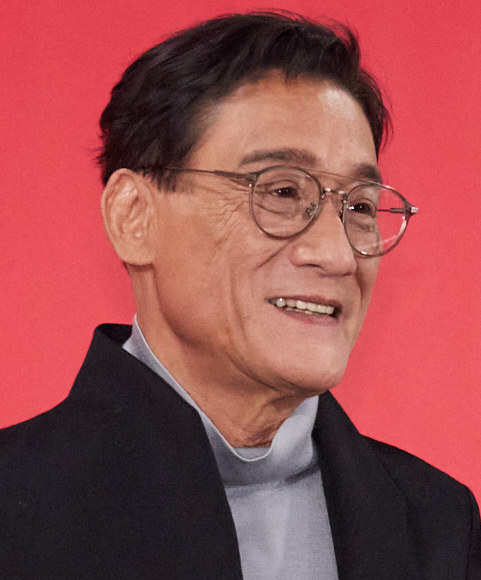
- Awarded for: Best Actor of the year
- Country: China
- Presented by: China Film Association; China Federation of Literary and Art Circles; Xiamen Municipal People's Government; 1905.com
- First award: 1981
- Final award: 2026
- Winner (2026): Tony Leung Ka-fai for The Shadow's Edge
- Website: Golden Rooster Awards

The Golden Rooster for Best Actor (中国电影金鸡奖最佳男主角) is one of the main categories of competition of the Golden Rooster Awards. It is awarded to leading male actor(s) who have outstanding performance in motion pictures.

== Award winners and nominees ==
=== 1980s ===
Year	Winner and nominees (English)	Winner and nominees (Chinese)	English title	Original title
1981	N/A			
1982	Zhang Yan	张雁	Laughter at the Moon Bay	月亮湾的笑声
1982	Feng Hanyuan	冯汉元	Neighbour	邻居
1982	Jin Ange	金安歌	The Xi'an Incident	西安事变
1983	N/A			
1984	Dong Xingji	董行佶	Liao Zhongkai	廖仲恺
1984	Yang Zaibao	杨在葆	Blood is Always Hot	血，总是热的
1984	Li Wei	李纬	River Without Buoys	没有航标的河流
1985	Lv Xiaohe	吕晓禾	Wreaths at the Foot of the Mountain	高山下的花环
1986	Liu Zifeng	刘子枫	Black Cannon Incident	黑炮事件
1986	Kong Xianzhu	孔宪珠	Jue Xiang	绝响
1986	Tu Yigong	吐依贡	Money	钱这个东西……
1986	Zhu Xu	朱旭	A Narrow Lane Celebrity	小巷名流
1987	Liu Wenzhi	刘文治	Sun Yat-sen	孙中山
1988	Zhang Yimou	张艺谋	Old Well	老井
1988	Jiang Wen	姜文	Red Sorghum	红高粱
1988	Liu Wei	刘威	The Warrior	关中大侠
1989	Tao Zeru	陶泽如	Night Bell/Happy Heroes	晚钟、欢乐英雄
1989	Xie Yuan	谢园	'King of Chess/Out of Breath	棋王、大喘气
1989	Lei Han	雷汉	Reincarnation	轮回
1989	Yan Xiang	严翔	When does the day break?	问天何时明

=== 1990s ===
Year	Winner and nominees (English)	Winner and nominees (Chinese)	English title	Original title
1990	Lu Qi	卢奇	The Baise Uprising	百色起义
1990	Gu Yue	古月	Founding Ceremony	开国大典
1990	Qi Mengshi	奇梦石	Long Yun and Chiang Kai-shek	龙云与蒋介石
1991	Li Xuejian	李雪健	Jiao Yulu	焦裕禄
1991	Chen Baoguo	陈宝国	Peking Duck Restaurant	老店
1991	Zhang Fengyi	张丰毅	Dragon Year Cops	龙年警官
1992	Wang Tiecheng	王铁成	Zhou Enlai	周恩来
1992	Li Fazeng	李法曾	After the Battle	决战之后
1992	Shao Honglai	邵宏来	Kai Tian Pi Di	开天辟地
1992	Zhu Xu	朱旭	Xin Xiang	心香
1993	Ge You	葛优	After Separation	大撒把
1993	Wei Zi	巍子	Jiang Zhuying	蒋筑英
1993	Zhu Xu	朱旭	A Confucius family	阙里谭
1994	Li Baotian	李保田	No More Applause	凤凰琴
1994	Wu Gang (actor)	巫刚	Red Firecracker, Green Firecracker	炮打双灯
1994	Zhou Lijing	周里京	Artillery Commander	炮兵少校
1995	Li Rentang	李仁堂	The Accused Uncle Shangang	被告山杠爷
1995	Niu Zhenhua	牛振华	Back to Back, Face to Face	背靠背，脸对脸
1996	Gao Ming	高明	Kong Fansen	孔繁森
1996	Cao Jingyang	曹景阳	Brother Wu Invites the God	吴二哥请神
1996	Shao Bing	邵兵	Winner	赢家
1997	Liu Peiqi	刘佩琦	The Days Without Lei Feng	离开雷锋的日子
1997	Feng Gong	冯巩	Ambush	埋伏
1997	Lu Qi	卢琦	The Great Transition	大转折
1998	Feng Gong	冯巩	A Tree in House	没事偷着乐
1998	Tang Guoqiang	唐国强	Long March	长征
1999	Teng Rujun	滕汝俊	Postmen in the Mountains	那山那人那狗
1999	Tian Chengren	田成仁	Golden Marriage	金婚
1999	Wang Yanan	王亚楠	Once Upon a Time in Shanghai	上海纪事

=== 2000s ===
Year	Winner and nominees (English)	Winner and nominees (Chinese)	English title	Original title
2000	Chen Daoming	陈道明	My 1919	我的1919
2000	Wang Qingxiang	王庆祥	Final Decision	生死抉择
2000	You Yong	尤勇	Neverland	梦幻田园
2000	Zhu Xu	朱旭	Shower	洗澡
2001	Ge Zhijun	戈治均	Escort	押解的故事
2001	Pan Yueming	潘粤明	A Love of Blueness	蓝色爱情
2001	Vincent Zhao	赵文卓	The Sino-Dutch War 1661	英雄郑成功
2001	Wang Xueqi	王学圻	Together Forever	相伴永远
2002	Ning Cai	宁才	Heavenly Grassland	天上草原
2002	Liu Peiqi	刘佩琦	Together	和你在一起
2002	Xiao Rongsheng	肖荣生	Facing Life	面对生命
2003	Xia Yu	夏雨	The Law of Romance	警察有约
2003	Ge You	葛优	Cala, My Dog!	卡拉是条狗
2003	Fan Wei	范伟	The Parking Attendant in July	看车人的七月
2003	Lu Qi	卢琦	Deng Xiaoping	邓小平
2004	Liu Ye	刘烨	Years Without Epidemic	美人草
2004	Liu Wei	刘威	Defending Reputation	疑案忠魂
2005	Jackie Chan	成龙	New Police Story	新警察故事
2005	Luo Deyuan	罗德元	Silent Mountains	沉默的远山
2005	Pu Cunxin	濮存昕	A Bright Moon	一轮明月
2005	Tobgyal	多布杰	Kekexili: Mountain Patrol	可可西里
2005	Wu Jun	吴军	Zhang Side	张思德
2006-2007	Fu Dalong	富大龙	The Forest Ranger	天狗
2006-2007	Chen Kun	陈坤	The Knot	云水谣
2006-2007	Damian Lau	刘松仁	The Tokyo Trial	东京审判
2006-2007	Li Yixiang	李易祥	One Foot of the Ground	鸡犬不宁
2006-2007	Liu Peiqi	刘佩琦	5 Bullets	五颗子弹
2006-2007	Qiu Lin	邱林	A Postman of Paradise	香巴拉信使
2008-2009	Wu Gang	吴刚	Iron Man	铁人
2008-2009	Fan Wei	范伟	Lucky Dog	耳朵大有福
2008-2009	Ma Guowei	马国伟	Old Fish	千钧。一发
2008-2009	Sun Min	孙敏	Deng Pingshou	我是花下肥泥巴
2008-2009	Zhang Hanyu	张涵予	Assembly	集结号

=== 2010s ===
Year	Winner and nominees (English)	Winner and nominees (Chinese)	English title	Original title
2010-2011	Sun Chun	孙淳	Qiu Xi	秋喜
2010-2011	Aaron Kwok	郭富城	Love for Life	最爱
2010-2011	Liu Zhibing	刘之冰	The Space Dream	飞天
2010-2011	Wang Qianyuan	王千源	The Piano in a Factory	钢的琴
2010-2011	Zhu Xu	朱旭	Lan	我们天上见
2012-2013	Huang Xiaoming	黄晓明	American Dreams in China	中国合伙人
2012-2013	Zhang Guoli	张国立	Back to 1942	一九四二
2012-2013	Tao Zeru	陶泽如	Song of the Phoenix	百鸟朝凤
2012-2013	Huang Jue	黄觉	Fallen City	倾城
2012-2013	Sun Weimin	孙维民	The Story of Zhou Enlai	周恩来的四个昼夜
2014-2015	Zhang Hanyu	张涵予	The Taking of Tiger Mountain	智取威虎山
2014-2015	Andy Lau	刘德华	Lost and Love	失孤
2014-2015	Sun Weimin	孙维民	Who is Undercover	一号目标
2014-2015	Chen Jianbin	陈建斌	A Fool	一个勺子
2016-2017	Deng Chao	邓超	The Dead End	烈日灼心
2016-2017	Feng Xiaogang	冯小刚	Mr. Six	老炮儿
2016-2017	Tu Men	涂们	A Simple Goodbye	告别
2016-2017	Bao Bei'er	包贝尔	When Larry Met Mary	陆垚知马俐
2016-2017	Liao Fan	廖凡	The Final Master	师父
2018-2019	Wang Jingchun	王景春	So Long, My Son	地久天长
2018-2019	Xu Zheng	徐峥	Dying to Survive	我不是药神
2018-2019	Tu Men	涂们	Old Beast	老兽
2018-2019	Duan Yihong	段奕宏	The Looming Storm	暴雪将至
2018-2019	Fu Dalong	富大龙	Enter the Forbidden City	进京城
2018-2019	Yang Taiyi	杨太义	Crossing The Border-Zhaoguan	过昭关

=== 2020s ===
Year	Winner and nominees	English title	Character
2020	Huang Xiaoming	The Bravest	Jiang Liwei
2020	Da Peng	My Dear Liar	Wu Hai
2020	Xiao Yang	Sheep Without a Shepherd	Li Weijie
2020	Wu Yuhan	Almost a Comedy	Sun Tong
2020	Jackson Yee	Better Days	Liu Beishan
2021	Zhang Yi	Cliff Walkers	Zhang Xianchen
2021	Yu Hewei	Cliff Walkers	Zhou Yi
2021	Liu Ye	Island Keeper	Wang Jicai
2021	Guo Xiaodong	My Father, Jiao Yulu	Jiao Yulu
2021	Jackson Yee	A Little Red Flower	Wei Yihang
2022	Zhu Yilong	Lighting Up the Stars	Mo Sanmei
2022	Shen Teng	Moon Man	Dugu Yue
2022	Wu Jing	The Battle at Lake Changjin	Wu Qianli
2022	Xu Zheng	Myth of Love	Lao Bai
2022	Jackson Yee	Nice View	Jing Hao
2023	Tony Leung Chiu-wai	Hidden Blade	Director He
2023	Huang Bo	Study Dad	Lei Dali
2023	Song Yang	Back to Tibet	Lao Kong
2023	Hui Wangjun	Like Father and Son	Gou Ren
2023	Yang Haoyu	Journey to the West	Tang Zhijun
2024	Lei Jiayin	Article 20	Han Ming
2024	Wang Yibo	One and Only	Chen Shuo
2024	Shen Teng	Pegasus 2	Zhang Chi
2024	Bowie Lam	In Broad Daylight	Cheung Kim-Wah
2024	Jinpa	Snow Leopard	Jinpa (eldest son)
2024	Peng Yuchang	Viva La Vida	Lü Tu
2025	Jackson Yee	Big World	Liu Chunhe
2025	Da Peng	The Lychee Road	Li Shande
2025	Zhu Yilong	The Volunteers: The Battle of Life and Death	Li Xiang
2025	Liu Haoran	Decoded	Rong Jinzhen
2025	Huang Xiaoming	Mostly Sunny	Wu You
2026	Tony Leung Ka-fai	The Shadow's Edge	Fu Lung-sang
2026	Jiang Qiming	Take Off	Li Mingqi
2026	Jiang Long	Being Towards Death	Zhang Xiaobing
2026	Tan Jianci	Sound of Silence	Li Qi
2026	Leo Wu	The Decisive Moment	Zhao Jihu
