= The Bugle from Gutian =

- Traditional Chinese: 古田軍號
- Simplified Chinese: 古田军号
- Hanyu Pinyin: Gǔtián Jūnhào
- Directed by: Chen Li
- Written by: Tian Yunzhang; Xu Baoqi; Chen Li
- Produced by: Liu Yimin
- Starring: Wang Renjun; Wang Zhifei; Liu Zhiyang; Hu Bing; Zhang Yishan; Sun Weimin; Li Youbin
- Music by: Ju Wenpei
- Production companies: August First Film Studio; Fujian Film Studio
- Release date: 1 August 2019
- Running time: 120 minutes
- Country: China
- Language: Mandarin

The Bugle from Gutian (Chinese: 古田军号) is a 2019 Chinese historical film directed by Chen Li and starring Wang Renjun, Wang Zhifei, Liu Zhiyang, Hu Bing, Zhang Yishan, Sun Weimin, and Li Youbin. It is produced jointly by August First Film Studio and Fujian Film Studio. It is based on the 1929 Gutian Congress. The film premiered in China on August 1, 2019, to commemorate the establishment of 70th anniversary of the People's Republic of China.

== Cast ==
- Wang Renjun as Mao Zedong
- Wang Zhifei as Zhu De
- Liu Zhiyang as Chen Yi
- Hu Bing as Liu Angong
- Zhang Yishan as Lin Biao
- Sun Weimin as Tailor Lin
- Li Youbin as boss of paper mill
- Dong Yue as He Zizhen
- Zou Xianyu

== Production ==
This film was shot in Fujian province.

== Release ==
The film premiered at the Great Hall of the People on July 26, 2019, and opened in China on August 1, 2019.

== Reception ==
Douban, the influential Chinese film reviews website, gave the drama 6.5 out of 10.

== Accolades ==
Date	Award	Category	Recipient(s) and nominee(s)	Result	Notes
2019	32nd Golden Rooster Awards	Golden Rooster Award for Best Picture	The Bugle from Gutian	Nominated	
2019	32nd Golden Rooster Awards	Golden Rooster Award for Best Supporting Actor	Wang Zhifei	Nominated	
2019	32nd Golden Rooster Awards	Golden Rooster Award for Best Music	Ju Wenpei	Nominated	
2019	National Five Top Project Award	Special Award	The Bugle from Gutian	Won	
2019	The 15th China US film festival	Golden Angel Award	The Bugle from Gutian	Won	
