= Wang Ying (actor) =

Chinese actor (1957–2024)

- 王霙
- Born: November 1957; Gudangwan, Hangzhou, Zhejiang, China
- Died: 25 August 2024 (aged 66)
- Education: Zhejiang Art School; National Theatre Company of China
- Occupation: Actor
- Years active: 1991–2024
- Notable work: Mao Zedong in 1925; My Long March
- Political party: Chinese Communist Party
- Spouses: Cheng Yufu (m. 1981; div. 1997) He Yalin (m. 2002)
- Awards: Full list

Wang Ying (Chinese: 王霙; pinyin: Wāng Yīng; November 1957 – 25 August 2024) was a Chinese actor. He has won the Huabiao Award for Outstanding Actor, 9th Golden Phoenix Award, Golden Rooster Award for Best Supporting Actor, and received the 22nd and 25th China Golden Eagle Awards for Favorite Actor.

== Biography ==
Wang was born in Gudangwan of Hangzhou city, Zhejiang province. He studied dance, drama and Yue opera at Zhejiang Art School, Central Hongqi Yue opera Troupe and National Theatre Company of China during his early years.

Wang married his first wife, Cheng Yufu (成郁馥), a Peking opera actress, in 1981, they divorced in October 1997.

In 2000, Wang met He Yalin (贺亚琳) in Yunnan province when he was filming Mao Zedong in 1925, who is a dresser, they married in July 2002.

Wang died on 25 August 2024, at the age of 66.

== Works ==
=== Film ===
| Year | English title | Chinese title | Role | Notes |
|---|---|---|---|---|
| 1991 | Epoch-making | 开天辟地 | Mao Zedong | |
| 1993 | Autumn Harvest Uprising | 秋收起义 | Mao Zedong | |
| 1995 | Yang Kaihui | 杨开慧 | Mao Zedong | |
| 2000 | Mao Zedong and Edgar Snow | 毛泽东与斯诺 | Mao Zedong | |
| 2001 | Mao Zedong in 1925 | 毛泽东在1925 | Mao Zedong | |
| 2003 | Mao Zedong Is Going to Anyuan | 毛泽东去安源 | Mao Zedong | |
| 2006 | My Long March | 我的长征 | Mao Zedong | |
| 2007 | August 1st | 八月一日 | Mao Zedong | |
| 2010 | Gutian, 1929 | 古田1929 | Mao Zedong | |
| 2012 | Zhaxi, 1935 | 扎西1935 | Mao Zedong | |
| 2017 | Battle of Xiangjiang River | 血战湘江 | Mao Zedong | |

=== Television ===
| Year | English title | Chinese title | Role | Notes |
|---|---|---|---|---|
| 1998 | Zhude Is Going To Jinggang Mountains | 朱德上井冈 | Mao Zedong | |
| 1999 | Huang Kecheng | 黄克诚 | Mao Zedong | |
| 2000 | The Sun Comes East | 日出东方 | Mao Zedong | |
| 2001 | War of Central Plains | 中原突围 | Mao Zedong | |
| 2002 | General Xiao Jingguang | 肖劲光大将 | Mao Zedong | |
| 2004 | Geda Living Buddha | 格达活佛 | Mao Zedong | |
| 2004 | Zhang Boling | 张伯苓 | Mao Zedong | |
| 2005 | General Chen Geng | 陈赓大将 | Mao Zedong | |
| 2006 | Peng Xuefeng | 彭雪枫 | Mao Zedong | |
| 2007 | Jinggang Mountains | 井冈山 | Mao Zedong | |
| 2007 | | 浴血坚持 | Mao Zedong | |
| 2009 | The Founding of the PRC | 红色摇篮 | Mao Zedong | |
| 2009 | Zhang Lan | 民主之澜 | Mao Zedong | |
| 2009 | The War of Nanjing | 决战南京 | Mao Zedong | |
| 2011 | The Founder of PRC: Zhu De | 开国元勋朱德 | Mao Zedong | |
| 2011 | My Youth in Yan'an | 我的青春在延安 | Mao Zedong | |
| 2012 | Wang Jiaxiang | 王稼祥 | Mao Zedong | |
| 2012 | Years of The Time | 风云岁月 | Mao Zedong | |
| 2012 | Nie Rongzhen | 聂荣臻 | Mao Zedong | |
| 2012 | General Su Yu | 粟裕大将 | Mao Zedong | |
| 2013 | Chen Yun | 陈云 | Mao Zedong | |
| 2014 | Battle of Changsha | 长沙保卫战 | Mao Zedong | |
| 2014 | Mao Zedong | 领袖 | Mao Zedong | |
| 2019 | Senior General Hong Xuezhi | 上将洪学智 | Mao Zedong | |
| TBA | Chongqing Negotiations | 重庆谈判 | Mao Zedong | |

== Awards ==
| Year | Work | Award | Result | Notes |
|---|---|---|---|---|
| 2001 | Mao Zedong in 1925 | Huabiao Award for Outstanding Actor | Won | |
| 2003 | | 9th Golden Phoenix Award | Won | |
| 2007 | My Long March | 22nd Chian Golden Eagle Award for Favorite Actor | Won | |
| 2007 | | Golden Rooster Award for Best Supporting Actor | Won | |
| 2010 | The Founding of the PRC | 25th Chian Golden Eagle Award for Favorite Actor | Won | |
