= Golden Rooster Award for Best Picture =

Chinese Film Awards

Golden Rooster Awards for Best Picture
- Native name: 金鸡奖最佳故事片
- Awarded for: Best Picture of the year
- Country: China
- Presented by: China Film Association; China Federation of Literary and Art Circles; Xiamen Municipal People's Government; 1905.com
- First award: 1981
- Final award: 2026
- Winner (2026): Dead To Rights
- Website: Golden Rooster Awards

The Golden Rooster Award for Best Picture is an award given to the best film at the Golden Rooster Awards.

== Award winners ==
Ceremony	Year	Title	Chinese title	Director
1st	1981	Evening Rain	巴山夜雨	Wu Yonggang, Wu Yigong
1st	1981	Legend of Tianyun Mountain	天云山传奇	Xie Jin
2nd	1982	Neighbor	邻居	Xu Guming, Zheng Dongtian
3rd	1983	Rickshaw Boy	骆驼祥子	Ling Zifeng
3rd	1983	At Middle Age	人到中年	Wang Qimin
4th	1984	Voice from Hometown (Xiang yin)	乡音	Hu Bingdang
5th	1985	The Girl in Red (Hong yi shao nu)	红衣少女	Lu Xiaoya
6th	1986	Wild Mountains (Ye shan)	野山	Yan Xueshu
7th	1987	Dr. Sun Yat-sen	孙中山	Ding Yinnan
7th	1987	Hibiscus Town	芙蓉镇	Xie Jin
8th	1988	Red Sorghum	红高梁	Zhang Yimou
8th	1988	Old Well	老井	Wu Tianming
9th	1989	Not awarded		
10th	1990	Founding Ceremony (Jue zhan zhi hou)	开国大典	Li Qiankuan, Xiao Guiyun
11th	1991	Jiao Yulu	焦裕禄	Wang Jixing
12th	1992	Decisive Engagement: The Liaoxi-Shenyang Campaign	大决战	Li Jun
13th	1993	The Story of Qiu Ju	秋菊打官司	Zhang Yimou
14th	1994	Country Teachers	凤凰琴	He Qun
15th	1995	The Accused Uncle Shangang	被告山杠爷	Fan Yuan
16th	1996	Red Cherry	红樱桃	Ye Daying
17th	1997	The Opium War	鸦片战争	Xie Jin
18th	1998	Live in Peace	安居	Hu Bingliu
19th	1999	Postmen in the Mountains	那山那人那狗	Huo Jianqi
20th	2000	The Road Home	我的父亲母亲	Zhang Yimou
20th	2000	Roaring Across the Horizon	横空出世	Chen Guoxing
20th	2000	Fatal Decision	生死抉择	Yu Benzheng
21st	2001	Mao Zedong, 1925	毛泽东在1925	Zhang Jinbiao
22nd	2002	Pretty Big Feet	美丽的大脚	Yang Yazhou
22nd	2002	Charging Out Amazon	冲出亚马逊	Song Yaming
23rd	2003	The River Wild	惊涛骇浪	Qu Junjie
23rd	2003	Nuan	暖	Huo Jianqi
24th	2004	Shanghai Story	美丽上海	Peng Xiaolian
25th	2005	On the Mountain of Tai Hang	太行山上	Wei Lian; Shen Dong; Chen Jian
25th	2005	Kekexili: Mountain Patrol	可可西里	Lu Chuan
26th	2007 (2006)	The Knot	云水谣	Yin Li
27th	2009 (2008)	Assembly	集结号	Feng Xiaogang
27th	2009 (2008)	Forever Enthralled	梅兰芳	Chen Kaige
28th	2011 (2010)	Shenzhou 11	飞天	Shen Dong
29th	2013 (2012)	American Dreams in China	中国合伙人	Peter Chan Ho-sun
29th	2013 (2012)	The Story of Zhou Enlai	周恩来的四个昼夜	Chen Li
30th	2015 (2014)	Wolf Totem	狼图腾	Jean-Jacques Annaud
31st	2017 (2016)	Operation Mekong	湄公河行動	Dante Lam
32nd	2019	The Wandering Earth	流浪地球	Frant Gwo
33rd	2020	Leap	夺冠	Peter Chan
34th	2021	Island Keeper	守岛人	Chen Li
35th	2022	The Battle at Lake Changjin	长津湖	Chen Kaige; Tsui Hark; Dante Lam
36th	2023	Creation of the Gods I: Kingdom of Storms	封神第一部：朝歌风云	Wuershan
37th	2024	Article 20	第二十条	Zhang Yimou
38th	2025	Her Story	好东西	Shao Yihui
39th	2026	Dead To Rights	南京照相馆	Shen Ao
