= Island Keeper =

- Film poster
- Traditional Chinese: 守島人
- Simplified Chinese: 守岛人
- Literal meaning: island-defending person/people
- Hanyu Pinyin: shǒu dǎo rén
- Directed by: Chen Li
- Written by: Chen Li; Gao Mantang; Ding Han; Zhao Zhe'en
- Produced by: Zhang Lizhong
- Starring: Liu Ye; Gong Zhe
- Cinematography: Ming Liang
- Music by: Ju Wenpei
- Production companies: August First Film Studio; Jiangsu Happy Blue Ocean Film Co., Ltd. Hebei Radio Television film culture Co., Ltd. Fujian Film Studio; Huaxia Film Distribution
- Distributed by: Huaxia Film Distribution
- Release date: 18 June 2021
- Running time: 125 minutes
- Country: China
- Language: Mandarin

Island Keeper (Chinese: 守岛人) is a 2021 Chinese biographical film directed and co-written by Chen Li and starring Liu Ye and Gong Zhe. The film follows the story of Wang Jicai and his wife's 32 years of guarding Kaishan Island in east China's Jiangsu province. The film premiered in China on 18 June 2021, to commemorate the 100th anniversary of the Chinese Communist Party.

== Cast ==
- Liu Ye as Wang Jicai, head of the militia post on Kaishan Island.
- Gong Zhe as Wang Shihua, Wang's wife.
- Hou Yong as Wang Changjie
- Sun Weimin as Wang's father
- Zhang Yishan as Xiao Douzi.
- Chen Chuang as Captain Bao
- Song Chunli
- Tao Huimin
- Ma Shaohua
- Chi Peng
- Xu Yu

== Production ==
This film was shot in Pingtan Island, southeast China's Fujian province. It took six months to shoot.

== Release ==
Island Keeper was released on 18 June 2021 in China.

== Reception ==
Douban, a major Chinese media rating site, gave the film 7.4 out of 10.

== Accolades ==
Date	Award	Category	Recipient(s) and nominee(s)	Result	Notes
2021	34th Golden Rooster Awards	Best Picture	Island Keeper	Won	
2021	34th Golden Rooster Awards	Best Actor	Liu Ye	Nominated	
2021	34th Golden Rooster Awards	Best Writing	Chen Li, Ding Han and Zhao Enzhe	Nominated	
