= Wang Jia (director) =

Chinese film director

Wang Jia (Chinese: 王珈; pinyin: Wáng Jiā) is a Chinese film director.

== Filmography ==
- Stands Still, the Last Great Wall (2009)
- The Space Dream (2011)

== Awards ==
He won the Award for Best Director at the 2011 Huabiao Awards. He was nominated for the Hundred Flowers Award for Best Director at the 30th Hundred Flowers Awards for Jing tian dong di.
