= Sun Weimin =

Chinese actor (born 1955)

- 孙维民
- Born: July 14, 1955 (age 71); Pulandian District, Dalian, Liaoning, China
- Education: Central Academy of Drama
- Occupation: Actor
- Years active: 1992–present
- Known for: typecasting Zhou Enlai

Chinese name
- Traditional Chinese: 孫維民
- Simplified Chinese: 孙维民
Transcriptions
Standard Mandarin
- Hanyu Pinyin: Sūn Wéimín

Sun Weimin (Chinese: 孙维民; born 14 July 1955) is a Chinese actor best known for typecasting Zhou Enlai in film and television. He first garnered recognition for his acting in 2013, when his performance in The Story of Zhou Enlai and earned him a Best Actor nomination at the 29th Golden Rooster Awards. In 2018, he starred in the television series My Uncle Zhou Enlai, which propelled him to become one of the most famous actors in China, and he was nominated for Outstanding Actor Award at the 31st Flying Apsaras Awards.

== Early life and education ==
Sun was born in Pulandian District of Dalian, Liaoning, on July 14, 1955. He graduated from the Central Academy of Drama.

== Acting career ==
Sun's first film role was uncredited appearance in the film Two Fugitive Girls (1992). He then guest starred on The Great Military March Forward film series.

He made his television debut in Seven Battles Seven Victories, playing Zhou Enlai. It is his first time to portray Zhou Enlai.

Sun starred as Lu Xun, reuniting him with co-star Shi Lanya, who played Xu Guangping, in the biographical television series Lu Xun and Xu Guangping (2001).

In 2004, Sun has appeared in supporting roles in two films, The Tide and Soldiers Of Huangpu.

Sun joined the main cast of General Zuo Quan as Zuo Quan, a general in the Red Army during the Chinese Communist Revolution and the Second Sino-Japanese War.

In the 2000s, he has had guest-starring roles in many television series, including The Story of Tibet (2010), The Sun Comes Up in the East (2010), New Fourth Army (2003), The Story of Minister of Public Security Luo Ruiqing (2007), Spring Comes Early in Grassland (2007), Zhou Enlai in Chongqing (2008), and The East is Red 1949 (2009).

In 2012, he earned critical acclaim for his performance as Zhou Enlai in Five-star Red Flag Fluttering 2, for which he received an Outstanding Actor Award at the 29th Flying Apsaras Awards.

Sun became widely known to audiences with The Story of Zhou Enlai, a historical drama film which garnered him a Best Actor nomination at the 29th Golden Rooster Awards.

In 2015, Sun played the role of Zhou Enlai in Zhao Junjie and Zhai Xiaoxing's film Who Is Undercover, for which he received his second Best Actor nomination at the 30th Golden Rooster Awards.

For his role as Lin Deshui in Battle of Xiangjiang River (2017), Sun was nominated for the Best Supporting Actor Award at the 31st Golden Rooster Awards.

Sun's big break came when Chen Li cast him in My Uncle Zhou Enlai, in which he played Zhou Enlai, a role which brought him much publicity and was nominated for Outstanding Actor Award at the 31st Flying Apsaras Awards. And he won the Best Actor in Television Award at the 12th Chinese American Film Festival.

== Filmography ==
=== Film ===
Year	English title	Chinese title	Role	Notes
1992	Two Fugitive Girls	越狱女囚		
1997	The Great Military March Forward: Pursue and Wipe Out in the South	大进军南线大追歼	Zhou Enlai	
1997	The Turning Point	大转折	Zhou Enlai	
1998	The Great Military March Forward: Engulf the Southwest	大进军席卷大西南	Zhou Enlai	
1998	Century Dream	世纪之梦	Zhou Enlai	
1999	Fight for Nanjing, Shanghai and Hangzhou	大进军大战宁沪杭	Zhou Enlai	
2004	The Tide	风起云涌	Zhou Enlai	
2004	Soldiers Of Huangpu	黄埔军人	Liao Zhongkai	
2010	Who Manages Ups and Downs	谁主沉浮	Zhuo Enlai	
2011	The Road of Exploring	湘江北去	He Shuheng	
2011	Big Setup	大格局	Zhou Enlai	
2012	The Early Summer	那年初夏		
2012	Love on Gallery Bridge	爱在廊桥	Ah Wang	
2013	The Story of Zhou Enlai	周恩来的四个昼夜	Zhou Enlai	
2014	Who Is Undercover	一号目标	Zhou Enlai	
2017	Battle of Xiangjiang River	血战湘江	Lin Deshui	
2019	The Bugle from Gutian	古田军号	Tailor Lin	

=== Television ===
Year	English title	Chinese title	Role	Notes
1995	Seven Battles Seven Victories	七战七捷	Zhou Enlai	
1995	Zhou Enlai in Dalian	周恩来在大连	Zhou Enlai	
1998		转战大西北	Zhou Enlai	
1998	Comrade Liu Shaoqi	少奇同志	Zhou Enlai	
1998	Events of the Plum Garden	梅园往事	Zhou Enlai	
1998	General Zhang Xueliang	张学良将军	Zhou Enlai	
2000	The Story of Tibet	西藏风云	Zhou Enlai	
2000	The Sun Comes Up in the East	日出东方	Liao Zhongkai	
2001	Lu Xun and Xu Guangping	鲁迅与许广平	Lu Xun	
2002	Very Civil	非常公民	Yoshioka Yasunao	
2003	New Fourth Army	新四军	Zhou Enlai	
2004	In the Same Boat	同舟共济	Zhou Enlai	
2005	Mayor	镇长	Communist Party Secretary	
2005	Rose	滴血玫瑰	Sandao	
2005	General Zuo Quan	抗日名将左权	Zuo Quan	
2007	Later	后来	Lawyer	
2007	The Story of Minister of Public Security Luo Ruiqing	公安部长罗瑞卿的故事	Zhou Enlai	
2007	Spring Comes Early in Grassland	草原春来早	Zhou Enlai	
2008	Wind Blast	西风烈	Fan Zhui	
2008	Helpfulness	乐意为人	Party chief of the County	
2008	Zhou Enlai in Chongqing	周恩来在重庆	Zhang Zhizhong	
2009		绿野艳阳红	Mr. Wu	
2009	The East is Red 1949	东方红1949	Zhou Enlai	
2009	Defend the Yan'an	保卫延安	Zhou Enlai	
2009		风云1949	Zhou Enlai	
2010	Zhao Dan	赵丹	Zhou Enlai	
2010	Mao Anying	毛岸英	Zhou Enlai	
2010	Nanjing Decisive Battle	决战南京	Zhou Enlai	
2010		民主之澜	Zhou Enlai	
2011	Behind the Smoke of War	硝烟背后的战争	Zhou Enlai	
2011	Five-star Red Flag Fluttering	五星红旗迎风飘扬	Zhou Enlai	
2011		翻山越岭战西北	Zhou Enlai	
2011	The East	东方	Zhou Enlai	
2012	Five-star Red Flag Fluttering 2	五星红旗迎风飘扬2	Zhou Enlai	
2014	Deng Xiaoping at History's Crossroads	历史转折中的邓小平	Zhou Enlai	
2014	Legend of the Last Emperor	末代皇帝传奇	Zhou Enlai	
2016	My Uncle Zhou Enlai	海棠依旧	Zhou Enlai	

== Film and TV Awards ==
Year	Nominated work	Award	Category	Result	Notes
2011		China Film Society of Performing Art Award		Won	
2013	The Story of Zhou Enlai	29th Golden Rooster Awards	Best Actor	Nominated	
2013	Five-star Red Flag Fluttering 2	29th Flying Apsaras Awards	Outstanding Actor	Won	
2015	Who Is Undercover	30th Golden Rooster Awards	Best Actor	Nominated	
2015	Who Is Undercover	11th Chinese American Film Festival		Won	
2016	My Uncle Zhou Enlai	12th Chinese American Film Festival	Best Actor in Television	Won	
2017	Battle of Xiangjiang River	31st Golden Rooster Awards	Best Supporting Actor	Nominated	
2017	Battle of Xiangjiang River	15th Ozerov International Military Film Festival	Best Supporting Actor	Won	
2018	My Uncle Zhou Enlai	31st Flying Apsaras Awards	Outstanding Actor	Nominated	
2018	My Uncle Zhou Enlai	29th China TV Golden Eagle Award	Best Actor	Nominated	
