= National Theatre Company of China =

The National Theater of China or National Theater Company of China (simplified Chinese: 中国国家话剧院; traditional Chinese: 中國國家話劇院), based in Beijing, is China's national theatrical company, founded on December 25, 2001 with the merger of China National Youth Theater (simplified Chinese: 中国青年艺术剧院; traditional Chinese: 中國青年藝術劇院) and China National Experimental Theater (simplified Chinese: 中央实验话剧院; traditional Chinese: 中央實驗話劇院).

It is known for presenting China's best theatrical performances. In addition, its affiliated actors are considered among the best in China, including:

Male Actors

- Chen Jianbin
- Guo Tao
- Jiang Wu
- Liao Fan
- Liu Duan Duan
- Liu Peiqi
- Liu Ye
- Sun Honglei
- Tong Dawei
- Wang Ying
- Wu Yue
- You Yong
- Zhang Fengyi
- Zhou Jie

Actresses

- Chen Hong
- Chen Shu
- Ding Jiali
- Hao Lei
- Li Bingbing
- Qin Hailu
- Tao Hong (born 1969)
- Tao Hong (born 1972)
- Yuan Quan
- Zhang Ziyi
- Zhu Yuanyuan
