= Fight for Nanjing, Shanghai and Hangzhou =

- Traditional Chinese: 大進軍大戰寧滬杭
- Simplified Chinese: 大进军大战宁沪杭
- Hanyu Pinyin: Dàjìnjūn Dàzhàn Nínghùháng
- Directed by: He Xiaojiang; Shi Wei
- Written by: Lu Zhuguo
- Produced by: Zhang Shuangbo; Liu Guangjun; Shang Changyi; Xu Gang
- Starring: Gu Yue; Sun Feihu; Liu Xitian; Xie Weicai; Sun Weimin; Lu Qi
- Cinematography: Dong Yachun; Wang Weidong; Li Bingkun
- Edited by: Nie Weiguo; Huang Weifu
- Music by: Yang Xiwu
- Production company: August First Film Studio
- Distributed by: Southern Film Co., Ltd.
- Release date: 1999 (China)
- Running time: 112 minutes
- Country: China
- Language: Mandarin

Fight for Nanjing, Shanghai and Hangzhou (Chinese: 大进军大战宁沪杭), also known as Great Battle in Ning Hu Hang, is a 1999 Chinese epic war film directed by He Xiaojiang and Shi Wei and written by Lu Zhuguo, and starring Gu Yue, Sun Feihu, Liu Xitian, Xie Weicai, Sun Weimin, and Lu Qi. The film premiered in China in 1999. The film is about the war between the Chinese Communist Party troops and the Kuomintang troops in east China during the Chinese Civil War.

== Plot ==
In April 1949, after the three major campaigns (Liaoshen Campaign, Huaihai Campaign and Pingjin Campaign), Mao Zedong and Zhu De orders the Communist army to march into the east China. Nanjing, the capital of Republic of China (1912-1949) is occupied by the Chinese Communist Party. Then Hangzhou comes under Communists sovereign. On May 27, Shanghai is controlled by the Communist troops. The Kuomintang troops are defeated and flee in disorder.

== Cast ==
=== Main ===
- Gu Yue as Mao Zedong
- Sun Feihu as Chiang Kai-shek
- Liu Xitian as Chen Yi
- Xie Weicai as Su Yu
- Sun Weimin as Zhou Enlai
- Lu Qi as Deng Xiaoping

=== Supporting ===
- Fu Xuecheng as Liu Bocheng
- Xiao Xiong as Soong May-ling
- Yu Zhong as Tan Zhenlin
- Jiang Changyi as Zhang Zhen
- Xu Guangming as Gu Zhutong
- Ye Qingling as Tang Enbo
- Lu Xuegong as Chen Yi
- Wang Wufu as Zhu De
- Guo Fazeng as Liu Shaoqi
- Wang Jian as Ren Bishi
- He Yongsheng as Wei Guoqing
- Wang Yilun as Chen Xilian
- Cao Peichang as Liu Changyi

== Release ==
Fight for Nanjing, Shanghai and Hangzhou was released in China in 1999.

== Accolades ==
Date	Award	Category	Recipient(s) and nominee(s)	Result	Notes
2000	20th Golden Rooster Awards	Best Sound Recording	Wang Lewen	Nominated	
