= Battle of Xiangjiang River =

- Traditional Chinese: 血戰湘江
- Simplified Chinese: 血战湘江
- Hanyu Pinyin: Xuězhàn Xiāngjiāng
- Directed by: Chen Li
- Written by: Liu Jianwei; Bai Tiejun; Xiang Xiaomi
- Starring: Wang Ying; Xu Jian; Dong Yong; Bao Jianfeng; Sun Weimin; Zhang Yishan
- Music by: Ju Wenpei
- Production company: August First Film Studio
- Distributed by: China Film Co., Ltd.
- Release date: 30 June 2017
- Running time: 118 minutes
- Country: China
- Language: Mandarin

Battle of Xiangjiang River (Chinese: 血战湘江) is a 2017 Chinese war film directed by Chen Li, written by Liu Jianwei, Bai Tiejun and Xiang Xiaomi, and starring Wang Ying, Xu Jian, Dong Yong, Bao Jianfeng, Sun Weimin and Zhang Yishan. The film picks up the story of the 34th division of the Red Army officers and soldiers paid great sacrifice to cover the Central Committee of the Chinese Communist Party through Xiangjiang River, and successfully broke through the blockade of the Kuomintang, during the early months of the Long March.

== Plot ==
From November 27, 1934 to December 1, the Red Army fought with the Kuomintang army in Xing'an County, Quanzhou County and Guanyang County in the territory of Guangxi province for 5 days, finally, the Red Army through Xiangjiang in the border of Quanzhou County and Xing'an County, they broke through the blockade of the Kuomintang army.

== Cast ==
- Wang Ying as Mao Zedong, chairman of the Central Executive Committee of the Chinese Soviet Republic.
- Dong Yong as Peng Dehuai, regimental commander of the 3rd Red Regiments.
- Xu Jian as Zhou Enlai, member of the Central Executive Committee of the Chinese Soviet Republic, political commissar of the 3rd Red Regiments.
- Sun Weimin as Lin Deshui, Mao Zedong's tailor.
- Bao Jianfeng as Chen Shuxiang, division commander of the 24th Division.
- Geng Le as Geng Biao
- Zhang Yishan as Li Tianyou
- Wang Dazhi as Huwa
- Hou Tianlai as He Jian, governor of Hunan province.
- Liu Zhibing as Bai Chongxi

== Production ==
Battle of Xiangjiang River employed more than 35,000 extras, 2 tons of TNT explosive, and 80 tons of gasoline.

Battle of Xiangjiang River marked the second collaboration between Chen Li and Ju Wenpei, after their first collaboration My Uncle Zhou Enlai.

== Release ==
The film premiered in Beijing on November 27, 2016 with wide-release in China on June 30, 2017.

== Reception ==
=== Box office ===
The film grossed 73.076 million yuan in Chinese box office.

=== Accolades ===
Award	Category	Recipient(s) and nominee(s)	Result	Notes
2017 Shanghai International Film Festival	Organizing Committee of the Special Award	Battle of Xiangjiang River	Won	
31st Golden Rooster Awards	Best Film	Battle of Xiangjiang River	Nominated	
31st Golden Rooster Awards	Best Supporting Actor	Sun Weimin	Nominated	
31st Golden Rooster Awards	Organizing Committee of the Special Contribution Award	Battle of Xiangjiang River	Won	
15th Ozerov International Military Film Festival	Best Visual Effects	Battle of Xiangjiang River	Won	
15th Ozerov International Military Film Festival	Best Supporting Actor	Sun Weimin	Won	
15th Ozerov International Military Film Festival	Best Original Score	Ju Wenpei	Won	
Five Aspects Project	Award of Excellence	Battle of Xiangjiang River	Won	
25th Beijing College Student Film Festival	Committee Award	Battle of Xiangjiang River	Won	
