= When Larry Met Mary =

- Poster
- Chinese: 陆垚知马俐
- Directed by: Wen Zhang
- Production companies: Chenming Pictures (Shanghai); Haining Yixian Entertainment; Junzhu (Shanghai) Entertainment; Huayi Brothers Media Group; Chinese Culture Shareholding; Jiecheng Ruiji Entertainment; Flagship Entertainment Group; Beijing Weiying Shidai Technology; Great Wall Entertainment; Shanghai Shangshu Investment; Shenzhen Dongfang Fuhai Investment Management
- Distributed by: HuaYi Brothers Film International Issues Company; Chenming Pictures (Shanghai); Beijing Weiying Shidai Technology; Sanyue Guyu (Beijing) Meida; Eastern Mordor; Sihai Distribution Association; Huaying Tianxia (Tianjin) Film Distribution; Huaxia Film Distribution; Gewara
- Release date: 15 July 2016
- Running time: 107 minutes
- Country: China
- Language: Mandarin
- Box office: CN¥162.9 million

When Larry Met Mary is a 2016 Chinese romantic comedy film directed by Wen Zhang. It was released in China on 15 July 2016.

== Plot ==
When Larry Met Mary follows the story of a shy and timid man, who has secretly loved his classmate for a long time and looking forward for a second chance.

== Cast ==
- Bao Bei'er
- Song Jia
- Zhu Yawen
- Jiao Junyan
- Guo Jingfei
- Guo Tao
- Ma Yili
- Li Chen
- Chen He
- Chang Yuan
- Bao Wenjing
- Jiu Kong
- Yu Shasha
- Zhang Yiming
- Wen Zhang
- Alejandro Muñoz

== Reception ==
The film has grossed CN¥162.9 million in China.

== Awards and nominations ==
Awards	Category	Nominee	Results	Ref.
31st Golden Rooster Awards	Best Actor	Bao Bei'er	Nominated	
31st Golden Rooster Awards	Best Actress	Song Jia	Nominated	
31st Golden Rooster Awards	Best Supporting Actor	Zhu Yawen	Nominated	
31st Golden Rooster Awards	Best Supporting Actress	Jiao Junyan	Nominated	
31st Golden Rooster Awards	Best Directorial Debut	Wen Zhang	Won	
31st Golden Rooster Awards	Best Writing	Shi Luan	Nominated	
31st Golden Rooster Awards	Best Sound	An Wei	Nominated	
