= Golden Rooster Award for Best Supporting Actor =

Chinese Film Awards

Golden Rooster Awards for Best Supporting Actor
- Awarded for: Best Supporting Actor of the year
- Country: China
- Presented by: China Film Association; China Federation of Literary and Art Circles; Xiamen Municipal People's Government; 1905.com
- First award: 1981
- Winner (2025): Ben Yuen for The Dumpling Queen
- Website: Golden Rooster Awards

Golden Rooster for Best Supporting Actor (中国电影金鸡奖最佳男配角) is the main category of Competition of Golden Rooster Awards.Awarding to supporting actor(s) who have outstanding performance in motion pictures.

== Award Winners & Nominees ==
=== 1980s ===
Year	Winner and nominees (English)	Winner and nominees (Chinese)	English title	Original title
1981	Lu Qing	卢青	Evening Rain	巴山夜雨
1981	Shi Ling	石灵	Evening Rain	巴山夜雨
1981	Zhong Xinghuo	仲星火	Evening Rain	巴山夜雨
1982	Sun Feihu	孙飞虎	The Xi'an Inciden	西安事变
1982	Yu Shaokang	于绍康	In Laws	喜盈门
1983	Niu Ben	牛犇	The Herdsman	牧马人
1983	Zhi Yitong	智一桐	Liberation Of Nanjing	风雨下钟山
1984	Yu Shizhi	于是之	Qiu Jin	秋瑾
1984	Chen Peisi	陈佩斯	Sunset Street	夕照街
1984	Hu Hao	胡浩	The Land of Rebirth	再生之地
1984	Wei Beiyuan	位北原	Sounds of Home	乡音
1985	He Wei	何玮	Wreaths at Foot of Moutainn	高山下的花环
1986	Xin Ming	辛明	Wild Mountains	野山
1986	Yan Xiang	严翔	Sunrise	日出
1987	N/A			
1987	He Haiquan	赫海泉	Zhi Feng Da Zhan	直奉大战
1987	Zhai Junjie	翟俊杰	The Battle of Taierzhuang	血战台儿庄
1987	Zheng Zaishi	郑再石	Hibiscus Town	芙蓉镇
1988	Li Baotian	李保田	Ren Gui Qing	人鬼情
1988	Xie Yan	谢衍	Old Well	老井
1988	Niu Xingli	牛星丽	Old Well	老井
1989	Sun Min	孙敏	Wan Zhong	晚钟
1989	Jin Hua	金华	Happy Heroes/Yin Yang Jie	欢乐英雄、阴阳界
1989	Xie Yuan	谢园	The Price of Frenzy	疯狂的代价

=== 1990s ===
Year	Winner and nominees (English)	Winner and nominees (Chinese)	English title	Original title
1990	Sun Feihu	孙飞虎	Founding Ceremony	开国大典
1990	Liang Tian	梁天	Black Snow	本命年
1991	N/A			
1991	Ba Teer	巴尔特	The Knight	骑士风云
1991	Ma Enran	马恩然	Peking Duck Restaurant	老店
1991	Zhao Fan	赵凡	Metropolis 1990	大城市1990
1992	N/A			
1992	Fei Yang	费洋	Xin Xiang	心香
1992	You Yong	尤勇	Bell of Purity Temple	清凉寺钟声
1992	Xie Yuan	谢园	The Weddings	高朋满座
1993	Wei Zongwan	魏宗万	San Mao Joins the Army	三毛从军记
1993	Lei Kesheng	雷恪生	Woman Sesame Oil Maker	香魂女
1993	Li Ding (actor)	李丁	An Answer from Heaven	天堂回信
1993	Li Ruping	李如平	The Imperial Concubine Yang	杨贵妃
1994	Fang Zige	方子哥	No More Applause	无人喝彩
1994	Yu Shaokang	于少康	Hurricane Over the Sea	大海风
1994	Zhao Xiaorui	赵小锐	Red Firecracker, Green Firecracker	炮打双灯
1995	N/A			
1995	Ju Hao	句号	Back to Back, Face to Face	背靠背，脸对脸
1996	Zhao Jun	赵军	Wu Er Ge Qing Shen	吴二哥请神
1996	Tu Men	涂们	The Sorrow of Brook Steppe	悲情布鲁克
1997	Lin Liankun	林连昆	The Opium War	鸦片战争
1997	Sun Chun	孙淳	Drug Heroes	缉毒英雄
1997	Duo Buji	多布吉	Red River Valley	红河谷
1998	Ge Cunzhuang	葛存壮	Zhou Enlai, a Great Friend	周恩来——伟大的朋友
1998	Tao Zeru	陶泽如	A Time to Remember	红色恋人
1998	Sun Min	孙敏	Settlement	安居
1999	Du Yuan	杜源	The Grass House	草房子
1999	Liu Ye	刘烨	Postmen in the Mountains	那山那人那狗
1999	Xie Tian	谢添	The Matchmaker	红娘
1999	Zhang Hongjie	张宏杰	Nan Fu Nu Zhu Ren	男妇女主任

=== 2000s ===
Year	Winner and nominees (English)	Winner and nominees (Chinese)	English title	Original title
2000	Lei Ming	雷明	Final Decision	生死抉择
2000	Fu Biao	傅彪	Sorry Baby	没完没了
2000	Zhao Tieren	赵铁人	Neverland	梦幻田园
2001	Fu Biao	傅彪	Escort	押解的故事
2001	Sunhaiying	孙海英	Zou Chu Xi Bai Po	走出西柏坡
2001	Zhang Huizhong	张惠中	The Full Moon	月圆今宵
2002	Wang Zhiwen	王志文	Together	和你在一起
2002	Sun Haiying	孙海英	Pretty Big Feet	美丽的大脚
2003	Zhao Jun	赵军	The Parking Attendant In July	看车人的七月
2003	Huang Haibo	黄海波	Jing Tao Hai Lang	惊涛骇浪
2003	Li Youbin	李幼斌	Jing Tao Hai Lang	惊涛骇浪
2004	Feng Yuanzheng	冯远征	Shanghai Story	美丽上海
2004	Wang Xueqi	王学圻	Warriors of Heaven and Earth	手机
2004	Zhang Guoli	张国立	Cell Phone	手机
2005	Tang Guoqiang	唐国强	Zhang Side	张思德
2005	Daniel Wu	吴彦祖	New Police Story	新警察故事
2005	Feng Li	冯栎	Peacock	孔雀
2005	Wang Luoyong	王洛勇	Deng Xiaoping in 1928	邓小平1928
2006-2007	Wang Ji	王霁	One Foot Off The Ground	鸡犬不宁
2006-2007	Jiang Wu	姜武	5 Bullets	5颗子弹
2006-2007	Liu Zhifeng	刘志峰	The Forest Ranger	天狗
2006-2007	Niu Ben	牛犇	Classroom	两个人的教室
2006-2007	Qiu Lin	邱林	Riding Alone for Thousands of Miles	千里走单骑
2008-2009	Wang Xueqi	王学圻	Forever Enthralled	梅兰芳
2008-2009	Deng Chao	邓超	Assembly	集结号
2008-2009	Huang Bo	黄渤	Iron Man	铁人
2008-2009	Jiao Gang	焦刚	And the Spring Comes	立春
2008-2009	Sun Honglei	孙红雷	Forever Enthralled	梅兰芳
2008-2009	Yang Xinmin	杨新敏	Her Promise	阿妹的诺言

=== 2010s ===
Year	Winner and nominees (English)	Winner and nominees (Chinese)	English title	Original title
2010-2011	Xu Caigen	徐才根	Apart together	团圆
2010-2011	Ba Yin	巴音	Beyond the Sacred Land	圣地额济纳
2010-2011	Huang Xiaoming	黄晓明	The Message	风声
2010-2011	Jin Shijie	金士杰	Blind Cinema	盲人电影院
2010-2011	Li Xinmin	李新敏	Lao Zhai	老寨
2010-2011	Zhao Erkang	赵尔康	Secret Fragrance	暗香
2012-2013	Wang Qingxiang		The Grandmaster	
2012-2013	Ding Yongdai		Fallen City	
2012-2013	Liu Jian		China Liulaozhuang 82 Warriors	
2012-2013	Chen Yiheng		Xuhaifeng's Gun	
2012-2013	Jiao Gang		Feng Shui	
2014-2015	Zhang Yi		Dearest	
2014-2015	Han Tongshen		12 Citizens	
2014-2015	Jing Boran		Lost and Love	
2014-2015	Wang Qianyuan		Brotherhood of Blades	
2014-2015	Zhang Hui		Yan Xiang	
2016-2017	Yu Hewei		I Am Not Madame Bovary	
2016-2017	Wang Qianyuan		Saving Mr. Wu	
2016-2017	Zhu Yawen		When Larry Met Mary	
2016-2017	Sun Weimin		Battle of Xiangjiang River	
2016-2017	Zhang Yi		Cock and Bull	
2016-2017	Zhang Hui		Relocate	
2018-2019	Wang Zhifei	王志飞	The Bugle from Gutian	古田军号
2018-2019	Zhang Yu	章宇	Dying to Survive	我不是药神
2018-2019	Wang Chuanjun	王传君	Dying to Survive	我不是药神
2018-2019	Tian Zhuangzhuang	田壮壮	Us and Them	后来的我们
2018-2019	Li Yunhu	李云虎	Crossing the Border - Zhaoguan	过昭关
2018-2019	Xin Baiqing	辛柏青	Legend of the Demon Cat	妖猫传

=== 2020s ===
Year	Winner and nominees	English title	Original title
2020	Yin Xiaotian	The Bravest	烈火英雄
2020	Wu Gang	Leap	夺冠
2020	Ou Hao	The Captain	中国机长
2020	Huang Jue	Better Days	少年的你
2020	Zhang Yi	The Climbers	攀登者
2021	Fan Wei	One Second	一秒钟
2021	Zhu Yawen	Chinese Doctors	中国医生
2021	Xiao Yang	The Captain	我的姐姐
2021	Liu Peiqing	Babusha Forest Farm	八步沙
2021	Nicholas Tse	Raging Fire	怒火
2022	Xin Baiqing	Yanagawa	漫长的告白
2022	Zhu Yawen	The Battle at Lake Changjin	长津湖
2022	Chen Minghao	Be Somebody	扬名立万
2022	Yang Chengcheng	Goodbye the Groundhog	再见土拨鼠
2022	Zhou Yemang	Myth of Love	爱情神话
2023	Li Xuejian	Creation of the Gods I: Kingdom of Storms	封神第一部：朝歌风云
2023	Hu Jun	Born to Fly	长空之王
2023	Jinba	Back to Tibet	回西藏
2023	Lei Jiayin	Full River Red	满江红
2023	Wang Yibo	Hidden Blade	无名
2024	Wang Xiao	Endless Journey	三大队
2024	Wang Chuanjun	No More Bets	孤注一掷
2024	Bai Ke	Johnny Keep Walking!	年会不能停！
2024	Fan Chengcheng	Pegasus 2	飞驰人生2
2024	Lobsang Chompel	Snow Leopard	雪豹
2025	Ben Yuen	The Dumpling Queen	水饺皇后
2025	Zhou Zhengjie	A Long Shot	老枪
2025	Mark Chao	Her Story	好东西
2025	Zu Feng	Brief History of a Family	家庭简史
2025	Geng Le	The Hedgehog	刺猬
