= Fallen City =

- Directed by: Huang Hong (actor)
- Screenplay by: Huang Hong (actor); Wang Jin Ming
- Produced by: Matthew Liu; Wang Yanzhi
- Starring: Huang Jue; Ruby Lin; Ding Yongdai
- Cinematography: Li Wen Sheng
- Edited by: Duan Xiaojie; Chen Hua
- Music by: Liu Su Jun, Dong Wei
- Production companies: Chang Ying Group; Beijing Galloping Horse Group; August First Film Studio
- Distributed by: Beijing Galloping Horse Group; China Film Group; Desen International Media
- Release date: May 10, 2013
- Running time: 92 minutes
- Country: China
- Language: Mandarin

Fallen City (simplified Chinese: 倾城; traditional Chinese: 傾城; pinyin: Qing Cheng) is a 2013 Chinese disaster film directed by Huang Hong (actor) and stars Huang Jue, Ruby Lin and Ding Yongdai. Fallen City is chronicles the fates of a small-town policeman, a bank robber and a rebellious young woman in the aftermath of the 2008 Sichuan earthquake.

== Plot ==
Shubei town, southeast China, the present day. Five years after he fled with RMB 800,000 from a bank robbery, Liu Chuan(Huang Jue) returns incognito to the town. Policeman Wang Laoshi(Ding Yongdai), who was on duty at the time of the robbery and was demoted for letting Liu escape, is working in the same district police station to which he was transferred after the robbery and still keeps an eye on Liu. By chance, Liu stays in some small lodgings in Wang's district where Qin Xiaosong(Ruby Lin), a psychology graduate who's run away from her domineering parents, is staying. Next day, Wang spots Liu in the street and gives chase, finally handcuffing him in a deserted warehouse. At that moment, the town is devastated by an earthquake and the building collapses. Wang is knocked unconscious and Liu steals his uniform. After rescuing Qin, Liu finds himself roped into saving other townspeople and becomes a hero in the locals' eyes. Meanwhile, Wang recovers and sets out to hunt down Liu...

== Cast ==
- Huang Jue as Liu Chuan
- Ruby Lin as Qin Xiaoxiong
- Ding Yongdai as Wang Laoshi
- Sun Min as Fan, Civil Affairs Bureau employee
- Yu Bin as bank employee
- Li Yixiao as school head
- Hou Shijia as Li
- Zhang Jie as bank employee
- Zhu Xiaoxue as blind woman
- Tian Donglin as landlady
- Yang Yu as institute head
- Ren Shilei as shoeshine man
- Liu Fengkai as old school employee
- Tang Zuohui as bird person
- Su Su as hotpot person
- Zheng Shaoxing as man
- Xia Chengji as child
- Wu Jia as Lu Chuan's wife
- Zuo Dan as Master Wei
- Zhu Jia'ni as Miaomiao
- Ba Deng as hairdresser
- Xie Zhigang as thief)
- Huang Zijun as lame Liu
- Dong Liang as flower person
- Qing Feng as presenter
- Tang Lin as newspaper person
- Qiu Lian as teacher.

== Production ==
The script by Huang Hong (actor) and Wang Jin Ming(王金明) takes the idea of a criminal who swaps identities with the very policeman who's been hunting him for five years and develops it into a character drama in which the former unexpectedly finds an opportunity to redeem himself for the robbery he originally committed.

Production on the film started from June 2009, First premiere of the film is 15 Jun, 2011 at Shanghai International Film Festival.

== Accolades ==
List of awards and nominations
Award	Category	Nominee	Result
The 29th Golden Rooster Awards	Best Original Screenplay	Huang Hong, Wang Jin Ming	Won
The 29th Golden Rooster Awards	Best Film		Nominated
The 29th Golden Rooster Awards	Best Actor	Huang Jue	Nominated
The 29th Golden Rooster Awards	Best Supporting Actor	Ding Yongdai	Nominated
The 29th Golden Rooster Awards	Best Music	Liu Su Jun	Nominated
The 1st Crystal Rouge Film Festival in France	Best Director	Huang Hong	Won
The 20th Beijing College Student Film Festival	Grand Jury Prize	Huang Hong	Won
The 20th Beijing College Student Film Festival	Best Film		Nominated
2013 Xia Yan Film and Literature Awards	Outstanding Original Screenplay	Huang Hong	Won
The 8th Beijing Film Festival for Youth Welfare	Favorite Actress	Ruby Lin	Won
