= Huang Hong (actor) =

Chinese skit and sitcom actor and writer (born 1960)

- Born: Huang Changshou (黄长寿); May 25, 1960 (age 66); Harbin, Heilongjiang, China
- Education: Liaoning University; People's Liberation Army Academy of Art
- Occupations: Actor, comedian
- Years active: 1987 - present
- Spouse: Duan Xiaojie (m. 1986)
- Children: Huang Zhaohan (黄兆涵)
- Parent: Huang Feng (黄枫)

Chinese name
- Traditional Chinese: 黃宏
- Simplified Chinese: 黄宏
Transcriptions
Standard Mandarin
- Hanyu Pinyin: Huáng Hóng

Huang Hong (Chinese: 黄宏; born May 25, 1960) is a Chinese skit and sitcom actor and writer. He is also a TV- and movie producer, and film director.

== Career ==
Born in Harbin, he joined the People's Liberation Army (PLA) when he was only 13. He studied philosophy at Liaoning University and performance at the People's Liberation Army Academy of Art. Huang was a regular sketch comedy performer on the CCTV New Year's Gala, appearing on the show almost uninterruptedly for over two decades between 1989 and 2012, during which he became a household name in China. Some of his skits including Anti-family plan Guerrilla, Poker. The director and the leading actor of films A Father With His 25 Children (2001) and Sunny Courtyard (2007).

He became the head of the August First Film Studio in 2012. In March 2015 he was removed from the position of unknown reasons, though the media speculated about his involvement in corruption. He has been linked by Chinese-language media to disgraced general Xu Caihou. However, later his return to the stage indicate that all accusations were false.

== Personal life ==
Huang's father Huang Feng (黄枫) is a kuaishu performing artist. Huang has two elder brothers.

In 1986, at the age of 26, Huang got acquainted with Duan Xiaojie (段小洁), an actress in Shenyang Mass Art Center. They married on October 8, 1989. Their daughter, Huang Zhaohan (黄兆涵; nickname: Huang Doudou 黄豆豆), was born in 1994.

Military offices
Previous: Ming Zhenjiang (明振江)	Head of the August First Film Studio; 2011-2015	Next: TBA
