= The Story of Zhou Enlai =

2013 Chinese period drama film

- Film poster
- Traditional Chinese: 周恩來的四個晝夜
- Simplified Chinese: 周恩来的四个昼夜
- Literal meaning: Four days and nights of Zhou Enlai
- Hanyu Pinyin: Zhōu Ēnlaí dĕ Sìgè Zhòuyè
- Directed by: Chen Li
- Written by: Tian Yunzhang; Jiang Yue
- Produced by: Shang Shuzhong; Bai Jingjun
- Starring: Sun Weimin; He Wei; Chu Zhibo; Niu Ben; Hao Yan; Bai Qing
- Cinematography: Huang Shan
- Edited by: Yang Qianxun
- Music by: Zhang Shaotong
- Production companies: Hebei Film Studio; August First Film Studio; Huaxia Film Distribution; Beijing Chunqiusihai Film Investment Co., LTD
- Distributed by: Huaxia Film Distribution
- Release date: 16 July 2013 (China)
- Running time: 103 minutes
- Country: China
- Language: Mandarin

The Story of Zhou Enlai (Chinese: 周恩来的四个昼夜) is a 2013 Chinese historical drama film written by Tian Yunzhang and Jiang Yue and directed by Chen Li. Based on the life of Premier Zhou Enlai between May 3 and May 7, 1961, when he investigated extensively and scientifically the rural situation in Huaxi of Guiyang and the old revolutionary base Boyan Township of Hebei, it stars Sun Weimin as Zhou Enlai and Hao Yan as Zhou's wife Deng Yingchao, with He Wei, Bai Qing, Chu Zhibo, and Niu Ben. The film premiered in China on 16 July 2013.

== Plot ==
In the late 1950s and the early 1960s, the newly established Communist State suffered a natural disaster for three years running. The mistake of Great Leap Forward and Soviets' pressing for the repayment presented severe difficulties for national economy. In 1961, under the leadership of Mao Zedong, all the Chinese leaders went to the forefront to do investigation.

On May 3, 1961, Zhou Enlai (Sun Weimin) comes to Boyan, an old revolutionary base in north China's Hebei province, to do investigation. On the way to Boyan Township, Zhou Enlai sees trees had been despoiled of their leaves. He feels puzzled. Guo Fenglin (He Wei), the director of Boyan People's Commune, sends people to shut the dissidents, and then takes some people to greet Zhou Enlai. As soon as Zhou Enlai meets Guo Fenglin, he asks where are the leaves, Guo Fenglin lies to Zhou Enlai. A passing little girl named Lian Di says the truth that the leaves were ate by local hungry people.

Zhou Enlai is in a meeting all morning. Everyone is not telling the truth, they all praise the present policy. At noon, Guo Fenglin invites Zhou Enlai to dinner. When Zhou Enlai sees the braised pork and eggs on the table, he do not even enter the door. Soon afterwards, Zhou Enlai comes to the kitchen and ate a bowl of congee and half a substituted steamed corn bread (窝窝头). In the afternoon after the meeting, Lian Di comes home with Zhou Enlai. Lian Di's grandma sang a laozi opera to Zhou Enlai and tells Zhou Enlai the truth situation. At night, Zhou Enlai comes to the classroom following the sound of reading, the children tells Zhou Enlai that they skipped classes because of hunger.

On the second day, after inquiring about the situations of the field and the post office, Zhou Enlai comes to the Danganhu's (go-it-aloner) home to ask for information. The 65-year-old bachelor tells Zhou Enlai that he is an individualist and he is afraid that others will eat his ration. At night, a freak storm badly damages all the sweet potato vines which were just planted. All the villagers are carrying rain gears to the fields to deal with the flood. Zhou Enlai is very melancholy when he sees the villagers working in the torrential rain. Zhou Enlai comes to the kitchen to help cooking a pot of brown sugar water.

On the third day, after the farewell party, Zhou Enlai holds a meeting. Zhang Erting, an honest farmer, tells to Zhou Enlai that he has a bone to pick with the public dining hall (公共食堂) and it should be adjustment and he is against the way of dining. He complains to Zhou Enlai that the people are hungry that's because some officials and cooks ate and took more than their share. Zhang Erting's opinion broke the silence, Zhou Enlai listens to them carefully and asks solicitously.

In the small hours of the fourth day, Zhou Enlai has a long talk with Mao Zedong on the phone. On the morning, Zhou Enlai comes to Zhang Erting's home and says that he wants to adopt Zhang Erting's youngest son, but Zhang refuses because he promised to bring the children up no matter how difficult it is. Later, Zhou Enlai conveys Mao Zedong's instructions in the microphone that Mao agreed with Zhang Erting's opinion and close the dining hall right now.

On the morning of the fifth day, the Boyan people all come to the road to send Zhou Enlai.

== Cast ==
- Sun Weimin as Zhou Enlai
- Hao Yan as Deng Yingchao
- He Wei as Guo Fenglin, the current Director of Boyan People's Commune.
- Chu Zhibo as Zhang Erting
- Niu Ben as Guo Baisui, Guo Fenlin's father, former branch secretary in Boyan Township.
- Bai Qing as Lian Di's grandma
- Liu Peiqi
- Chen Chuang as Sheng De
- Wang Yichan as Sheng De's wife
- Chu Xingyi as Lao Yan'er (Short-spoken)
- Wang Jingsong as Teacher Wang
- Xu Liang as Ma Lie
- Geng Sheng as Hanzi
- Zhang Bo as Branch Secretary Fang
- Li Jun as Wang Chunhe
- Hu Jiayi as Lian Di
- Xu Jingyi as Xu Ming
- Song Binghui as Guo Hu
- Chi Ning as Lian Di's father
- Hou Zan as Fang Tianjian

== Production ==
The films was shot entirely on location in Boyan Town of Wu'an, a county-level city administered as part of Handan, Hebei, China.

== Release ==
The Story of Zhou Enlai was released on 16 July 2013, in China.

== Reception ==
Douban gave the film 6 out of 10. The audience criticized the film for covering up the historical truth and promoting individual worship.

== Accolades ==
Date	Award	Category	Recipient(s) and nominee(s)	Result	Notes
2013	Golden Rooster Awards	Best Sound	Zhang Shaotong	Won	
2013	Golden Rooster Awards	Best Picture	The Story of Zhou Enlai	Won	
2013	Golden Rooster Awards	Best Actor	Sun Weimin	Nominated	
2013	Huabiao Awards	Outstanding Director	Chen Li	Won	
2013	Huabiao Awards	Outstanding Film	The Story of Zhou Enlai	Won	
