= Tian Yunzhang =

Chinese calligrapher (1945–2024)

- 田蕴章
- Born: 1 May 1945; Tianjin, China
- Died: 4 February 2024 (aged 78); Tianjin, China

Academic work
- Discipline: Calligraphy
- Institutions: Nankai University

Tian Yunzhang (田蕴章; 1 May 1945 – 4 February 2024) was a Chinese calligrapher and a calligraphy professor of Nankai University. Tian died in Tianjin on 4 February 2024, at the age of 78.
