= The Final Master =

2015 Chinese film by Xu Haofeng

The Master
- 师父
- Directed by: Xu Haofeng
- Screenplay by: Xu Haofeng
- Produced by: Luo Xiaoxi; Lisa Li; Xu Haofeng
- Starring: Liao Fan; Song Jia; Jiang Wenli; Chin Shih-chieh; Huang Jue; Song Yang
- Cinematography: Wang Tianlin
- Edited by: Xu Haofeng; He Sisi
- Music by: An Wei
- Production companies: Beijing Century Partner Culture & Media Inc.; Heyi Pictures; Magilm Pictures; Wuxi Jieao Entertainment; Beijing Aizhi Ganchun Art; Thousands Delight Pictures; Funeng Investment; Qianhe Zhiyuan (Beijing) Capital Management; Beijing Weiying Shidai Technology
- Distributed by: Magilm Pictures; Huaxia Film Distribution; Beijing Weiying Shidai Technology; Jumai (Tianjin) Film Plan; YL Pictures
- Release dates: 11 November 2015 (Golden Horse Film Festival); 11 December 2015 (China)
- Running time: 109 minutes
- Country: China
- Language: Mandarin

The Master (师父), released internationally as The Final Master, is a 2015 Chinese martial arts film written, co-produced, and directed by Xu Haofeng, about the last Wing Chun master's quest to pass down his art in early 20th-century China. The film starred Liao Fan, Jiang Wenli, Chin Shih-chieh, Song Jia and Song Yang.

== Plot ==
The story follows the journey of Wing Chun Grandmaster Chen Shi, the last surviving practitioner, and his attempt to open a Martial Arts School in Tianjin, a city known for its martial arts culture. Intertwined with Chen's ambition is that of Madame Zou, who has her designs for taking control of the Martial Arts community in Tianjin.

The film opens with Geng Liangchen (Chen Shi's Apprentice) thoroughly humiliating Madame Zou's champion in a duel.

The film then cuts back in time to Chen Shi's arrival in Tianjin. Chen defeats all of Grandmaster Zheng Shan'ao's disciples. Zheng is the Grandmaster of the Tianjin Martial Art community. Zheng is impressed by Chen and learns that Chen practices Wing Chun - a little known southern style at the time. The two lament the fact that the true secrets of Martial Arts are not taught widely and that masters are restricted to passing their arts to two students in their lifetime. Zheng makes a proposition to Chen to remedy this and proposes that Chen open up a school with his help in Tianjin if Chen is willing to teach his secrets.

Chen declines this offer and chooses to open a school anyway to enhance his reputation. Chen cites a rule that allows him to open a school if he defeats eight of the Tianjin schools. Zheng warns Chen that if he chooses this route, he will be expelled. Zheng proposes that Chen train a local disciple who will defeat the eight schools. Chen says this will take three years, but Zheng tells him he has no choice. Zheng tells Chen he already has a candidate for Chen's disciple.

Chen decides he needs to marry a local woman and proposes marriage to the waitress at the restaurant where he is. The waitress, Zhao, is a pariah because she had a child with a foreigner when she was 17. Chen and Zhao's arrangement is that the two maintain appearances as a poor couple. She is never to ask him what he is doing in Tianjin, and he will take her shopping and bring her crab for dinner. Despite the sham marriage, the two of them have a continued physical (sexual) relationship.

One day Chen and Zhao are beset by thugs, whom Chen easily dispatches. This catches the attention of Geng, a local rickshaw coolie. Geng pays a visit to Chen and Zhao's residence - mostly to look at how beautiful Zhao is. He challenges Chen to a duel. Chen soundly defeats Geng but decides to accept him as a disciple.

Chen then tells Zheng that he has a new disciple and that the disciple Zheng had originally picked out for him, Duan Rui, is no longer needed. Zheng then reveals his design to Chen. After the disciple defeats the eight schools, Zheng will defeat the disciple, and this will further enhance his reputation in the Martial Arts world. The consequence from this is that the disciple will have to be cast out from Tianjin. Chen says that Geng is a nobody and doesn't pay a second thought that he will be cast out.

Geng turns out to be prodigy in Wing Chun and helps Chen attain the victories he needs well ahead of schedule. However, this draws the ire of Madame Zou, who visits Chen with her thugs to find out what his intentions are. Chen disavows Geng's victories, and Madame Zou decides to let him live on that basis. Zhao then realizes what Chen's ambitions are and that he intends to betray Geng. Chen angrily casts Zhao out.

Zheng is visited by a former student, Lin Xiwen, who is now an officer in the military. Lin tells Zheng he arranged a meeting for him with the Viceroy, but when Zheng attends the meeting, he is told that the Viceroy will not be attending. Instead they are to film a demonstration for the Viceroy. Zheng thoroughly defeats Lin in sparring. However, Lin ambushes Zheng using his weapon, and Lin is filmed defeating an injured Zheng. Madame Zou reveals that this was all her design to reestablish herself as the grandmaster. Zheng only became grandmaster after the death of Madame Zou's husband.

Zheng decides to leave for Brazil and refuses to fight Geng. Chen realizes his dream will likely not be achieved. Madama Zou invites Chen to tea and tells Chen that Geng will be considered an enemy. Chen offers that both he and Geng will leave Tianjin if Geng is not harmed. Madame Zou decides that both of them leaving will be seen by the world as the Tianjin Martial Arts community acting as a bully. She allows Chen to have his Wing Chun school for only one year after which Chen is to leave Tianjin.

Geng is attacked and defeats all of the thugs hired to attack him. Lin challenges Geng to a duel with knives but stabs him in the abdomen before Geng can even draw his knife. Lin offers to allow Geng to live, but Geng would have to leave Tianjin and never return. Geng is driven to the countryside and left there. Geng remains stubborn and rather than get medical attention, stumbles back to town and dies from blood loss.

On the day Chen is to open his school, Chen visits with the Tea Girl, who tells him about her friend Geng, who was famous for defeating the eight schools. She presents Chen (at his request) one of Geng's books which has Geng's blood stains inside the pages. Chen is visibly moved by this. In the opening ceremony for Chen's school, Madame Zou plays the film in which Zheng was defeated by Lin. Zou says Lin, the student, has overtaken his master and proclaims Lin the new grandmaster. Chen then challenges Lin and attacks him with a spear. Madame Zou blocks the attack and is stabbed in the chest. The film resumes and Chen is jumped by Madame Zou's thugs and held down. During this struggle one of Madame's Zou's thugs passes Chen a knife. Chen then lunges up quickly to slice Lin's throat before being pulled back to the ground. Zou blames Chen for Lin's death and tells him he will not be allowed to live. Chen is allowed a last request and laments he never had a chance to challenge Tianjin's master. Madame Zou sets up a match with 4 broadsword master and they defeat Chen. Chen offers to share his secrets and train students for Madame Zou in exchange for his life. While getting ready for a demonstration, Chen makes an escape. The entire Tianjin martial arts community - all 19 schools - goes after him.

Chen is trapped in an alley. Chen defeats each of the masters who come after him. Madame Zou sits at the end of the alley and Chen slices off her earring. Chen is ambushed by Duan Rui but is able to overpower him. Meanwhile his wife Zhao goes to the train station with her small dog where she is beset by Madame Zou and her entourage. Zhao is allowed to get on the train to Canton, however Zou has one of her underlings follow Zhao to pass a letter to pass to Chen personally. The letter basically says if Chen lives his life in obscurity he will be left alone. Madame Zhao declares that Wing Chun is dead. The film ends with Chen sitting beside the dog staring into the Geng's bloodstained book.

== Cast ==
- Liao Fan as Master Chen Shi (The Master)
- Jiang Wenli as Master Zou – The Madame
- Chin Shih-chieh as Zheng Shan’ao – The Grandmaster
- Song Jia as Zhao Guohui – Mrs. Chen
- Song Yang as Geng Liangchen – The Apprentice
- Huang Jue as Lin Xiwen – The Colonel
- Madina Memet as Tea Girl
- Ma Jun as Head Coolie
- Chen Kuan-tai as Kwoon Head
- Vicky
- Zhang Aoyue
- Hung Yan-yan
- Leon Dai
- Li Bo

== Release ==
The film was released in China and Taiwan in December 2015. It grossed CN¥54.8 million at the Chinese box office.

=== North American release ===
The film premiered at the 2016 Seattle International Film Festival on May 28, 2016. Director Xu Haofeng was present at the festival. Following its North America premiere, Director Xu travelled to San Francisco and Los Angeles to host preview screenings on May 30 and June 1, 2016, respectively. Well Go USA released the film in the United States on a Blu-ray and DVD combo package as well as Video on Demand on July 25, 2017. The combo package's special features include two featurettes and one trailer for the film.

== Reception ==
=== Critical reception ===
On review aggregator Rotten Tomatoes, the film holds an approval rating of 71% based on 17 reviews, with a weighted average rating of 7.3/10. On Metacritic, the film has a weighted average score of 72 out of 100, based on 13 critics, indicating "generally favorable reviews".

=== Awards and nominations ===
The film was nominated for Best Screenplay, Best Choreography and Best Supporting Actress at the 52nd Golden Horse Awards. It won Best Choreography.

The film was nominated for Best Actor and Best Supporting Actress at the 31st Golden Rooster Awards.
