= Tao Zeru =

Chinese actor

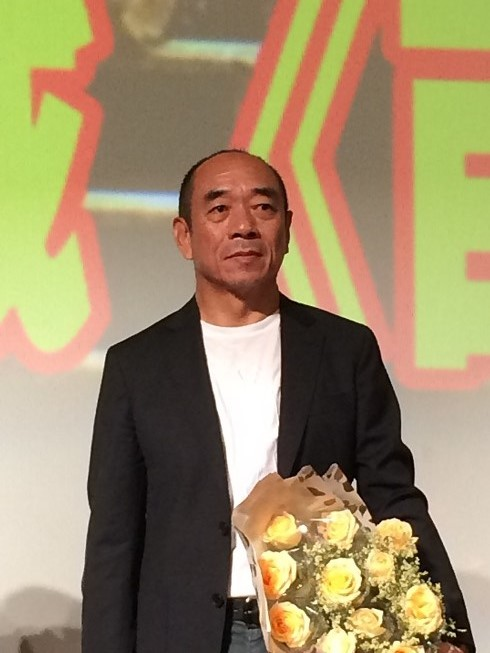

Tao Zeru (Chinese: 陶泽如) (born December 7, 1953) is a Chinese film and television actor. He was born in Nanjing, Jiangsu. He was a graduate of the Nanjing University of the Arts. He was the 1989 co-recipient of the Golden Rooster Award for Best Actor. He was a 1996 recipient of the Flying Apsaras Award for Outstanding Actor.

== Filmography ==
=== Film ===
Year	Title	Role
1984	One and Eight	Wang Jin
1986	Zui hou yi ge dong ri	
1988	Joyous Heroes	
1988	The Angelus	platoon leader
1988	Gua fu cun	Side
1988	Les Quatre Brigands du Huabei	
1988	Blood Reincarnation	
1990	The September of Mine	An Jianjun's Father
1991	Mountains of the Sun	
1991	The Big Mill	village head
1994	Red Dust	
1995	Don't Cry, Nanking	
1995	Dahong Midian	
1998	Hong se lian ren	Hao Ming
2011	The Founding of a Party	Zhang Xun
2011	1911	Tang Weiyong
2012	The Last Supper	Fan Zeng
2013	Song of the Phoenix	

=== Television ===
Year	Title	Role
1990	Shen Zhen Ren	
1995	Skynet	Zhao Tianxiang
2004	Crossings life	Chen Jinpeng
2007	Ming Dynasty	Wang Linguang
