= The Space Dream =

- Film poster
- Traditional Chinese: 飛天
- Simplified Chinese: 飞天
- Literal meaning: Space Travel
- Hanyu Pinyin: fēitiān
- Jyutping: fei1 tin1
- Directed by: Wang Jia; Shen Dong
- Written by: Liang Shuibao; Liu Hongwei; Liu Jianwei; Wang Qiang; Zhao Junfang
- Produced by: Bai Jingjun
- Starring: Liu Zhibing; Jiang Ruijia; Niu Li; Wu Gang; Zhao Xiaoming
- Production company: August First Film Studio
- Release date: 1 July 2011 (China)
- Running time: 110 minutes
- Country: China
- Language: Mandarin Chinese

The Space Dream (Chinese: 飛天) is a 2011 Chinese drama film directed by Wang Jia and Shen Dong.

== Cast ==
- Liu Zhibing as Zhang Tiancong
- Jiang Ruijia as Siyu
- Niu Li as Qu Dan
- Wu Gang as Li Dawei
- Zhao Xiaoming as Zhou Guanxiong
