= The Grandmaster (film) =

2013 Hong Kong-Chinese film by Wong Kar-wai

- Theatrical release poster
- Traditional Chinese: 一代宗師
- Simplified Chinese: 一代宗师
- Literal meaning: Ancestral teacher of a generation
- Hanyu Pinyin: Yīdài Zōngshī
- Jyutping: Jat1 Doi6 Zung1 Si1
- Directed by: Wong Kar-wai
- Screenplay by: Wong Kar-wai; Zou Jingzhi; Xu Haofeng
- Story by: Wong Kar-wai
- Produced by: Ng See-yuen; Megan Ellison; Wong Kar-wai
- Starring: Tony Leung; Zhang Ziyi; Chang Chen; Zhao Benshan; Song Hye-kyo; Wang Qingxiang
- Cinematography: Philippe Le Sourd
- Edited by: William Chang
- Music by: Shigeru Umebayashi; Stefano Lentini; Nathaniel Méchaly
- Production companies: Annapurna Pictures; Block 2 Pictures; Jet Tone Films; Sil-Metropole Organisation; Bona International Film Group
- Distributed by: Lark Films Distribution (Hong Kong); China Film Group Corporation (China)
- Release dates: 8 January 2013 (China); 10 January 2013 (Hong Kong)
- Running time: 130 minutes
- Countries: Hong Kong; China
- Languages: Mandarin; Cantonese; Japanese
- Budget: ¥240 million (US$38.6 million)
- Box office: US$64.1 million

The Grandmaster (Chinese: 一代宗师, Yi dai zong shi) is a 2013 martial arts drama film based on the life story of the Wing Chun grandmaster Ip Man. The film was directed and written by Wong Kar-wai. A Hong Kong-Chinese co-production, it was released on 8 January 2013 in China, and screened as the opening film at the 63rd Berlin International Film Festival in February 2013. It was selected as part of the 2013 Hong Kong International Film Festival. The Weinstein Company acquired the international distribution rights for the film. The film was selected as the Hong Kong entry for the Best Foreign Language Film at the 86th Academy Awards, making the January shortlist, but ultimately did not receive the nomination. Despite this, the film was nominated for Best Cinematography and Best Costume Design.

The film received a record-breaking 12 awards in the 33rd Hong Kong Film Awards, most wins for a single film in history. Zhang Ziyi also received an unprecedented 12 different Best Actress awards for her performance.

== Plot ==
Wing Chun grandmaster Ip Man (Tony Leung) reflects on the nature of martial arts as he battles a dozen combatants during a rainstorm in Foshan. Ip wins and experiences flashbacks of his life, from his early training at the age of seven, to his induction into Wing Chun by his master, Chan Wah-shun (Yuen Woo-Ping), and his marriage to Cheung Wing-sing (Song Hye-Kyo).

Ip Man's peaceful existence is threatened by the arrival of Gong Yutian (Wang Qing Xiang), the Wudangquan martial arts grandmaster from northern China, who announces that he has already retired and appointed Ma San (Zhang Jin) as his heir in the North. He then concedes that the South should have its own heir. A fight erupts as various masters attempt to challenge Gong, but they are deterred by Ma San. As the Southern masters deliberate on a representative, Gong Yutian's daughter Gong Er (Zhang Ziyi) arrives and tries to convince her father not to continue the fight, as she feels the Southern masters are unworthy. Meanwhile, the Southern masters decide on Ip Man to represent them. Three Southern masters test Ip's skills before the confrontation with Gong Yutian.

The "fight" between Ip Man and Gong Yutian turns out to be an exchange of philosophical ideas using a flat-cake as a metaphor for Chinese unity. Gong holds out the cake and dares Ip to break it. Although Gong evades many attacks, Ip eventually breaks the cake, but not before explaining that Gong should think beyond the north-south rivalry. Impressed by Ip's martial arts skill and philosophy, Gong declares Ip the winner. As Gong returns to the North, Gong Er sets out to regain her family's honor by challenging Ip Man. Ip offers that because "Kung Fu is about precision," whoever breaks a piece of furniture during the fight will be the loser. An intense fight breaks out between Ip Man and Gong Er, which concludes with victory for her after Ip breaks a stairstep while saving her from falling. Ip and Gong Er part on friendly terms, with Ip saying he wants a rematch in the future. They keep in contact by exchanging letters, and Ip intends to bring his family with him to northern China. His plans are soon disrupted by the outbreak of the Second Sino-Japanese War in 1937.

During the war, Ip Man and his family descend into poverty and he loses his two daughters to starvation. Meanwhile, in northern China, Ma San betrays China in favor of the puppet government in Manchuria and kills Gong Yutian as a hanjian. When Gong Er returns, Mr. Jiang (Shang Tie Long), the family servant, tells her Gong Yutian's final wish was for her to be happy and not to seek vengeance. Gong Er refuses to accept this, and instead makes a vow to Buddha to never teach, marry, or have children, devoting her life to vengeance against Ma San.

Ip Man moves to Hong Kong in 1950 in the hope of starting a career as a martial arts teacher. He spars with and soundly defeats other martial artists, earning a reputation. The Chinese government closes the border with Hong Kong in 1951 and Ip never sees his wife again. He meets Gong Er in Hong Kong on Chinese New Year's Eve 1950 and asks her for one more contest while implying that she should rebuild her family's martial arts school. Gong Er refuses, stating that many martial arts have disappeared throughout the course of history, and that her family's would not be the only one. A flashback 10 years earlier shows a confrontation between Gong Er and Ma San at a train station on Chinese New Year's Eve 1940, in which Gong Er defeats Ma San using one of her father's special moves that Ma San had failed to learn. Considering herself still bound to her vow, Gong Er moves to Hong Kong with Mr. Jiang to open a medical practice.

In 1952, Ip Man and Gong Er meet each other for the last time. Gong confesses to Ip that she has harbored romantic feelings for him since their first fight. She dies in 1953, taking her father's secrets of the Baguazhang to the grave. A voice-over from Ip reveals that the fight with Ma San left Gong badly injured, and she turned to opium to help with the pain. Ip Man's Wing Chun school flourishes, and he is able to popularize the once secretive and elitist martial art on a worldwide scale. Ip trains a young boy who grows up to be his most famous student: Bruce Lee.

== Cast ==
- Tony Leung Chiu-Wai as Ip Man / Ye Wen, disciple of Chan Wah-shun and a grandmaster of the Foshan Wing Chun martial art style from Southern China. Husband to Cheung Wing-sing and love interest of Gong Er. Becomes a Wing-Chun teacher in Hong Kong.
- Zhang Ziyi as Gong Ruo Mei / Gong Er, daughter of Gong Yutian and a master of the Baguazhang martial art style. Becomes a trained doctor and opens a clinic after exacting revenge on Ma San. Dies from her internal injuries and opium addiction.
  - Wu Yixuan as young Gong Er
- Zhang Jin as Ma San, first disciple of Gong Yutian and heir to Gong's Baguazhang martial art style. Main antagonist of the movie who becomes a Japanese conspirator, kills his master, and becomes an enemy to Gong Er. Killed by Gong Er.
- Song Hye-kyo as Cheung Wing-sing / Zhang Yongcheng, Ip Man's wife
- Yuen Woo-ping as Chan Wah-shun / Chen Huashun, Ip Man's martial arts teacher and grandmaster of the Wing-Chun martial art style.
- Wang Qingxiang as Gong Yutian / Gong Baoshen, Gong Er's father and grandmaster of the Baguazhang martial art style. Head of the Chinese Martial Arts Federation in Northern China. Killed by Ma San.
- Zhao Benshan as Ding Lianshan, disciple of Gong Yutian and senior to Gong Er.
- Shang Tielong as Jiang, loyal follower of the Gong family.
- Chin Shih-chieh as Wu Ye, a Gong clan elder and godbrother of Gong Yutian.
- Wang Jue as San Ye, a Gong clan elder and godbrother of Gong Yutian.
- Chang Chen as "The Razor" Yixiantian. Master of the Bajiquan martial art style. Saved by and befriends Gong Er while escaping from the Japanese to Hong Kong. Owner of the white rose hairdresser and becomes a Bajiquan teacher in Hong Kong.
- Xiaoshenyang as Sanjiangshui, a gangster in Hong Kong who became Yixiantian's disciple.
- Lau Ga-yung (credited as Lau Kar Yung) as Master Hong, Hung Gar martial arts practitioner in Foshan.
- Cung Le as Tiexieqi, challenges Ip Man in the opening of the film.
- Lo Hoi-pang as Uncle Deng, a well-known authority figure in the Foshan martial arts scene. Owner of the Foshan Gong He Association.
- Julian Cheung as Yi Ge, a renowned Cantonese tune performer in Foshan. Works at the association owned by Uncle Deng.
- Lau Shun as Rui
- Zhou Xiaofei as Gu
- Bruce Leung
- Lo Mang as Hei Mian Shen, a martial arts practitioner who challenges Ip Man by bringing his men to "learn" from the latter.
- Berg Ng

== Production ==
The film is well known for its long development time, having been announced in 2008. It was caught in development hell, partly because Tony Leung broke his arm while training in Wing Chun. The film is Wong's most expensive production to date. Wong intended the film to be a major collaboration with mainland China's film industry, noting that the enormous expansion and growth in China's film industry and market over the past decade has provided filmmakers with resources to make features that weren't possible before. Wong stated, "Films don't just belong to the mainland or Hong Kong. They belong to all Chinese and not just to a certain place at a certain time. It's a legacy that belongs to all of us."

== Music ==
The music is composed by Shigeru Umebayashi and Nathaniel Méchaly, with two works by Ennio Morricone and the original Stabat Mater composed by Stefano Lentini.

== Reception ==
The review aggregator website Rotten Tomatoes reported that 78% of 138 critics have given the film a positive review, with an average rating of 6.70/10. The site's critics consensus reads: "Though its storytelling is a tad muddled, Wong Kar Wai's The Grandmaster still exhibits the auteur's stylistic flourishes in gorgeous cinematography and explosive action set pieces." At Metacritic, the film has a weighted average score of 73 out of 100 based on 37 critics, indicating "generally favorable reviews".

Variety gave the film a positive review, stating Wong "exceeds expectations with The Grandmaster, fashioning a 1930s action saga into a refined piece of commercial filmmaking". The review also said: "Boasting one of the most propulsive yet ethereal realizations of authentic martial arts onscreen, as well as a merging of physicality and philosophy not attained in Chinese cinema since King Hu's masterpieces, the hotly anticipated pic is sure to win new converts from the genre camp."

While praising Tony Leung's Ip Man and Zhang Ziyi's Gong Er, calling the latter "more or less complete and coherent", The Hollywood Reporter lamented some of the more underdeveloped characters, stating that "the same can't be said of some of the other characters, such as Chang Chen’s Razor, an expert of the Bajiquan school who is supposed to be another of the grandmasters. Song Hye-kyo’s Madam Ip has only a cursory presence and is basically rendered invisible in the film’s second half."

Zhang Ziyi's performance as Gong Er has been praised by critics such as Scott Bowles of USA Today as the film's "discovery", and her character has been mentioned by critics such as Kenji Fujishima of Slant as the film's "real central figure" in spite of the film's title.

Owen Gleiberman of Entertainment Weekly wrote: "the film, despite a few splendid fights, is a bio-historical muddle that never finds its center." Mark Kermode in The Guardian called it "a hit-and-miss affair, often thrilling but equally incoherent."

The Grandmaster earned HK$21,156,949 (US$2.7 million) at the Hong Kong box office, and grossed over 312 million yuan (US$50 million) at the mainland Chinese box office, US$6,594,959 in North America, and US$64,076,736 in worldwide, thus becoming Wong's highest-grossing film to date.

== Versions ==
Three versions of the film have been released.

1. The "Chinese Cut" of the film runs 130 minutes.

2. The version of the film that debuted at the 2013 Berlin International Film Festival at 123 minutes.

3. The version released by The Weinstein Company is a more linear 108 minute cut that includes explanatory text for the benefit of Americans unfamiliar with the story,

Wong wrote in The Huffington Post that he was "never interested in telling a watered down version," but one that was tighter and provided greater historical context:

As a filmmaker, let me say that the luxury of creating a new cut for U.S. audiences was the opportunity to reshape it into something different than what I began with -- a chance one doesn't always get as a director and an undertaking much more meaningful than simply making something shorter or longer. The original version of THE GRANDMASTER is about 2 hours, 10 minutes. Why not 2 hours, 9 minutes or 2 hours, 11 minutes? To me, the structure of a movie is like a clock or a prized watch -- it's about precision and perfect balance.

Some critics believe the 130-minute version is superior. The Wrap called the film "sweeping, gorgeous, exciting – and butchered." Manohla Dargis at The New York Times wrote: "Too bad that the American distributor didn’t have enough faith in the audience to release the original."

== Awards and nominations ==
Organization	Award category	Recipients and nominees	Result
86th Academy Awards	Best Foreign Language Film		Shortlisted
86th Academy Awards	Best Cinematography	Philippe Le Sourd	Nominated
86th Academy Awards	Best Costume Design	William Chang	Nominated
20th Hong Kong Film Critics Society Award	Best Film		Won
20th Hong Kong Film Critics Society Award	Best Actress	Zhang Ziyi	Won
50th Golden Horse Awards	Best Film		Nominated
50th Golden Horse Awards	Best Director	Wong Kar-wai	Nominated
50th Golden Horse Awards	Best Actor	Tony Leung	Nominated
50th Golden Horse Awards	Best Actress	Zhang Ziyi	Won
50th Golden Horse Awards	Best Cinematography	Phillipe Le Sourd	Won
50th Golden Horse Awards	Best Visual Effect	Pierre Buffin	Won
50th Golden Horse Awards	Best Art Direction	William Chang	Won
50th Golden Horse Awards	Best Makeup and Costume Design	William Chang	Won
50th Golden Horse Awards	Best Action Choreography	Yuen Woo-ping	Nominated
50th Golden Horse Awards	Best Editing	William Chang	Nominated
50th Golden Horse Awards	Best Sound Effect	Robert Mackenzie and Trithep Wangpaiboon	Nominated
50th Golden Horse Awards	Audience Choice Award		Won
Boston Society of Film Critics Awards 2013	Best Cinematography	Phillipe Le Sourd	2nd Place
Denver Film Critics Society 2013	Best Non-English Language Feature		Won
Motion Picture Sound Editors Golden Reel Awards	Best Sound Editing: Sound Effects, Foley, Dialogue & ADR in a Foreign Feature Film	Robert Mackenzie, Traithep Wongpaiboon	Won
National Board of Review Awards 2013	Top Foreign Films		Won
Online Film Critics Society Awards 2013	Best Cinematography	Phillipe Le Sourd	Nominated
Phoenix Film Critics Society Award 2013	Best Foreign Language Film		Nominated
St. Louis Gateway Film Critics Association Awards 2013	Best Art Direction		Nominated
St. Louis Gateway Film Critics Association Awards 2013	Best Cinematography	Phillipe Le Sourd	Nominated
33rd Hong Kong Film Awards	Best Film		Won
33rd Hong Kong Film Awards	Best Director	Wong Kar-wai	Won
33rd Hong Kong Film Awards	Best Screenplay	Zou Jingzhi, Xu Haofeng, Wong Kar-wai	Won
33rd Hong Kong Film Awards	Best Actor	Tony Leung Chiu-wai	Nominated
33rd Hong Kong Film Awards	Best Actress	Zhang Ziyi	Won
33rd Hong Kong Film Awards	Best Supporting Actor	Zhang Jin	Won
33rd Hong Kong Film Awards	Best Cinematography	Phillipe Le Sourd	Won
33rd Hong Kong Film Awards	Best Film Editing	William Chang, Benjamin Courtines, Poon Hung-yiu	Won
33rd Hong Kong Film Awards	Best Art Direction	William Chang, Alfred Yau Wai-ming	Won
33rd Hong Kong Film Awards	Best Costume & Make-Up Design	William Chang	Won
33rd Hong Kong Film Awards	Best Action Choreography	Yuen Woo-ping	Won
33rd Hong Kong Film Awards	Best Original Film Score	Shigeru Umebayashi, Nathaniel Méchaly	Won
33rd Hong Kong Film Awards	Best Sound Design	Robert Mackenzie, Traithep Wongpaiboon	Won
33rd Hong Kong Film Awards	Best Visual Effects	Pierre Buffin	Nominated
Asia Pacific Screen Awards	Best Performance by an Actress	Zhang Ziyi	Won
29th Golden Rooster Awards	Best Actress	Zhang Ziyi	Nominated

== See also ==
- List of submissions to the 86th Academy Awards for Best Foreign Language Film
- List of Hong Kong submissions for the Academy Award for Best Foreign Language Film
