= American Dreams in China =

- Film poster

Chinese name
- Traditional Chinese: 中國合夥人
- Simplified Chinese: 中国合伙人
- Literal meaning: Chinese Business Partners
Transcriptions
Standard Mandarin
- Hanyu Pinyin: Zhōngguó héhuǒrén
- Directed by: Peter Chan
- Written by: Aubrey Lam; Zhou Zhiyong; Zhang Ji
- Produced by: Jojo Hui; Peter Chan
- Starring: Huang Xiaoming; Deng Chao; Tong Dawei; Du Juan
- Cinematography: Christopher Doyle
- Edited by: Xiao Yang
- Music by: Peter Kam
- Production companies: Edko Films Ltd. Media Asia Films; China Film Group Corporation; We Pictures Limited; Yunnan Film Group Co., Ltd. Stellar Mega Films Limited
- Distributed by: China Film Group Corporation; Media Asia Films; Edko Films
- Release date: May 17, 2013
- Running time: 112 minutes
- Country: China
- Languages: Mandarin; English
- Box office: US$87.6 million

American Dreams in China (Chinese: 中国合伙人) is a 2013 Chinese comedy-drama film co-produced and directed by Peter Chan and starring Huang Xiaoming, Deng Chao, and Tong Dawei. It was shown at the 2013 Toronto International Film Festival. It is based on the story of New Oriental.

== Plot ==
Three young Chinese men from poor backgrounds achieve success by establishing a reputable English teaching school. The film begins in 1985, during China's national study-abroad craze, a time when undergraduates became infatuated with America and believed that studying abroad was their only hope for a prosperous future.

Cheng Dongqing (Huang Xiaoming), Wang Yang (Tong Dawei), and Meng Xiaojun (Deng Chao) are three friends studying at Beijing's prestigious Yenching Academy. and simultaneously prepping for American visa interviews. Wang is the first to be granted one but forfeits it to stay with his Western girlfriend, while Cheng is repeatedly denied one. Only Meng actually gets a study visa, and as he's leaving, he tells his friends he has no intention of returning to China.

== Cast ==
- Huang Xiaoming as Cheng Dongqing
- Deng Chao as Meng Xiaojun
- Tong Dawei as Wang Yang
- Du Juan as Su Mei

== Awards and nominations ==
| Award | Category | Recipient | Result |
|---|---|---|---|
| 29th Golden Rooster Awards | Best Picture | American Dreams in China | Won |
| 29th Golden Rooster Awards | Best Director | Peter Chan | Won |
| 29th Golden Rooster Awards | Best Actor | Huang Xiaoming | Won |
| 29th Golden Rooster Awards | Best Supporting Actress | Du Juan | Nominated |
| 29th Golden Rooster Awards | Best Writing | Zhou Zhiyong/Zhang Ji/Lin Aihua | Nominated |
| 29th Golden Rooster Awards | Best Cinematographer | Du Kefeng | Nominated |
| 15th Huabiao Awards | Outstanding Film | American Dreams in China | Won |
| 15th Huabiao Awards | Best Original Screenplay | Zhou Zhiyong/Zhang Ji | Won |
| 15th Huabiao Awards | Best Director Outside the Mainland | Peter Chan | Won |
| 15th Huabiao Awards | Outstanding Actor | Huang Xiaoming | Won |
| 50th Golden Horse Film Festival and Awards | Best Supporting Actor | Tong Dawei | Nominated |
| 50th Golden Horse Film Festival and Awards | Best Original Screenplay | Zhou Zhiyong/Zhang Ji/Lin Aihua | Nominated |
| 50th Golden Horse Film Festival and Awards | Best Makeup & Costume Design | Wu Lilu | Nominated |
| 50th Golden Horse Film Festival and Awards | Best Film Editing | Xiao Yang | Nominated |
| 10th Guangzhou Student Film Festival | Most Popular Film | American Dreams in China | Won |
| 10th Guangzhou Student Film Festival | Most Popular Actor | Huang Xiaoming, Deng Chao & Tong Dawei | Won |
| 33rd Hong Kong Film Award | Best Supporting Actor | Tong Dawei | Nominated |
| 33rd Hong Kong Film Award | Best Supporting Actress | Du Juan | Nominated |
| 33rd Hong Kong Film Award | Best New Performer | Du Juan | Nominated |
| 4th Beijing International Film Festival | Best Picture | American Dreams in China | Nominated |
| 12th Changchun Film Festival | Best Director | Peter Chan | Won |
| 12th Changchun Film Festival | Best Actor | Huang Xiaoming | Won |
| 12th Changchun Film Festival | Best Supporting Actor | Tong Dawei | Won |
| 12th Changchun Film Festival | Best Cinematography | Du Kefeng | Won |
| 32nd Hundred Flowers Awards | Best Picture | American Dreams in China | Nominated |
| 32nd Hundred Flowers Awards | Best Actor | Huang Xiaoming | Won |
| 32nd Hundred Flowers Awards | Best Supporting Actor | Tong Dawei | Won |
| 10th Chinese American Film Festival | Best Actor | Huang Xiaoming | Won |
| 3rd Hamilton Behind The Camera Awards | Best Makeup & Costume Design | Wu Lilu | Won |
