= 17th Golden Eagle Awards =

Chinese TV awards ceremony in 1999

The 17th Golden Eagle Awards were held August 18, 1999, in Shenzhen. Nominees and winners are listed below, winners are in bold.

== Television series ==
=== Best Television Series ===
- **My Fair Princess**/**还珠格格**
- Yongzheng Dynasty/雍正王朝
- Red Prescription/红处方
- Sisters/姐妹
- Graduate/毕业生
- To Lead by the Hand/牵手
- Mother in Law, Daughter in Law, Sister in Law/婆婆·媳妇·小姑
- Ah, the mountain/啊，山还是山
- Heaven can Mercy/天若有情
- Shaoxing Brainman/绍兴师爷

=== Best Directing for a Television Series ===
- **Yang Yang for To Lead by the Hand**

=== Best Writing for a Television Series ===
- **Liu Heping, Luo Qianglie for Yongzheng Dynasty**

=== Best Lead Actor in a Television Series ===
- **Tang Guoqiang for Yongzheng Dynasty**
- Wu Ruopu for To Lead by the Hand
- Cheng Jianxun for Tiger in the Mountain

=== Best Lead Actress in a Television Series ===
- **Zhao Wei for My Fair Princess**
- Jiang Wenli for To Lead by the Hand
- Chang Yuan for Sisters

=== Best Supporting Actor in a Television Series ===
- **Jiao Huang for Yongzheng Dynasty**
- Wang Huichun for Yongzheng Dynasty
- Yan Zhicheng for To Lead by the Hand

=== Best Supporting Actress in a Television Series ===
- **Yang Kun for Mother in Law, Daughter in Law, Sister in Law**
- He Lin for To Lead by the Hand
- Gai Lili for Silver Chamber

=== Best Art Direction for a Television Series ===
- **Qin Duo for Yongzheng Dynasty**

=== Best Cinematography for a Television Series ===
- **Ma Ning for To Lead by the Hand**

=== Best Editing for a Television Series ===
- **Liu Miaomiao for Yongzheng Dynasty**

=== Best Lighting for a Television Series ===
- **Du Peng for Red Prescription**

== Documentary Program ==
=== Best Television Documentary ===
not awarded this year

- Days of Macau/澳门岁月
- Chinese Shield/中华之盾
- China Museum/中国博物馆
- 20 Years Anniversary - The Reform and Open to the Outside World/改革开放二十年
- Chinese/中国人
- Decisive Battle in Jiujiang/决战九江
- Jinchaji Artistic Soldier/晋察冀文艺兵
- Records of PRC/共和国之最

=== Best Short Documentary ===
not awarded this year

- A Hero Never Dies/真心英雄
- The Start of Hope/希望从这里延伸
- Chinese Surgeon and English War Prisoner/中国军医和英国战浮
- A Report for a Silent World/来自无声世界的报告
- Natural Color/本色
- Three Sisters of Miao nationality/苗家三姐妹
- Love Story/生活特别记录——爱的故事
- Employing Mother/应聘妈妈

=== Best Writing and Directing for a Television Documentary ===
- **Li Kai, Hu Zheng for Days of Macau**

=== Best Cinematography for a Television Documentary ===
- **Duo Ji, Hu Zheng for Days of Macau**

=== Best Sound Recording for a Television Documentary ===
- **Wang Qingwu, Suo Guoqing, Feng Qi, Wang Jiankang for Jinchaji Artistic Soldier**

== Children & Teens Program ==
=== Best Animation ===
not award this year

- Little Muddled God/小糊涂神
- Legend of Mad Monk/济公传奇
- Fool Cat/阿笨猫
- Vagabond Life of Bei/小贝流浪记
- God Chinese/封神榜传奇
- Elf Huidou/小精灵灰豆

=== Best Directing for an Animation ===
- **Directing group for Vagabond Life of Bei**

=== Best Writing for an Animation ===
- **Sun Youjun for Vagabond Life of Bei**

=== Best Image Design for an Animation ===
- **Ma Shouhong for Little Muddled God**

=== Best Sense Design for an Animation ===
- **Yu Zhenyan for God Chinese**

=== Best Composing for an Animation ===
- **Liang Gang for Fool Cat**
