= Flying Apsaras Award for Outstanding Actor =

Category of Chinese television award

Feitian Award for Outstanding Actor(中国电视剧飞天奖优秀男演员奖) is a main category of Feitian Awards.

== 2020s ==
Year	Annual	Nominees	Titles
2026	35th	Wang Renjun 王仁君	Blood-soaked Glory 浴血荣光
2026	35th	Yu Shi 于适	To the Wonder 我的阿勒泰
2026	35th	Yu Hewei 于和伟	Silent Honor 沉默的荣耀
2026	35th	Zhu Yawen 朱亚文	Wings of the Nation 海天雄鹰
2026	35th	Hu Jun 胡军	The Long Way Back 归队
2024	34th	Lei Jiayin 雷佳音	A Lifelong Journey 人世间
2024	34th	Hu Ge 胡歌	Bright Future 县委大院; Blossoms Shanghai 繁花
2024	34th	Zhang Luyi 张鲁一	Three-Body 三体
2024	34th	Jin Dong 靳东	Welcome To Milele 欢迎来到麦乐村
2024	34th	Huang Zhizhong 黄志忠	The Long River 天下长河
2022	33rd	Wang Lei 王雷	Medal of the Republic 功勋: 能文能武李延年
2022	33rd	Zhang Jiayi 张嘉益	Building the Stage 装台
2022	33rd	Huang Xuan 黄轩	Minning Town 山海情
2022	33rd	Yu Hewei 于和伟	Awakening Age 觉醒年代
2022	33rd	Ding Yongdai 丁勇岱	Going Across the Yalu River 跨过鸭绿江
2020	32nd	He Bing 何冰	The Love of Courtyard 情满四合院
2020	32nd	Lin Jiangguo 林江国	The Lovely China 可爱的中国
2020	32nd	Ni Dahong 倪大红	All Is Well 都挺好
2020	32nd	Tang Guoqiang 唐国强	Diplomatic Situation 外交风云
2020	32nd	Liu Zhiyang 刘智扬	Perfect Youth 最美的青春

== 2010s ==
Year	Annual	Nominees	Titles
2018 (Note: The awards ceremony was held on April 3rd, 2018 instead of in late 2017. No explanation was given for the change.)	31st	Zhang Tong 张桐	Heroes of Defense 绝命后卫师
2018	31st	Zhang Yi 张译	Feather Flies To The Sky 鸡毛飞上天
2018	31st	Sun Weimin 孙维民	My Uncle Zhou Enlai 海棠依旧
2018	31st	Yu Hewei 于和伟	Police Captain 刑警队长; The Advisors Alliance 大军师司马懿之军师联盟
2018	31st	Dong Yong 董勇	Marshal Peng Dehuai 彭德怀元帅
2015	30th	Chen Baoguo 陈宝国	The Chinese Old Peasant 老农民; All Quiet in Peking 北平无战事; The Mekong River 湄公河大案; The River Children 大河儿女 原乡
2015	30th	Wu Xiubo 吴秀波	马向阳下乡记; The Patriot Fei Yue 精忠岳飞
2015	30th	Hu Ge 胡歌	Nirvana in Fire 琅琊榜; The Disguiser 伪装者
2013	29th	Zhang Jiayi 张嘉译	营盘镇警事; The Cliff 悬崖; Angel Heart 心术 浮沉
2013	29th	Sun Weimin 孙维民	五星红旗迎风飘扬（第二部）
2013	29th	Ma Shaoye 马少骅	辛亥革命
2013	29th	Li Youbin 李幼斌	中国地
2011	28th	Huang Zhizhong 黄志忠	人间正道是沧桑 中国远征军 家常菜
2011	28th	Chen Baoguo 陈宝国	Teahouse茶馆 钢铁年代
2011	28th	Huang Haibo 黄海波	媳妇的美好时代
2011	28th	Li Xuejian 李雪健	命运
2011	28th	Sun Cun 孙淳	人间正道是沧桑
2011	28th	Ma Shaoye 马少骅	Yi Meng 沂蒙

== 2000s ==
Year	Annual	Nominees	Titles
2009	27th	Zhang Guoli 张国立	Golden Marriage 金婚
2009	27th	Sun Honglei 孙红雷	Lurk 潜伏
2009	27th	Li Youbin 李幼斌	闯关东
2009	27th	Cheng Yu 程昱	交通警察
2009	27th	Li Xuejian 李雪健	美丽人生
2009	27th	Jiao Huang 焦晃	荣归
2009	27th	Wang Baoqiang 王宝强	Soldiers Sortie 士兵突击
2009	27th	Duan Yihong 段奕宏	Soldiers Sortie 士兵突击
2009	27th	Lin Yongjian 林永健	喜耕田的故事
2009	27th	Wang Zhifei 王志飞	十万人家
2007	26th	Li Youbin 李幼斌	亮剑
2007	26th	Wang Wufu 王伍福	八路军
2007	26th	Gu Zhixin 谷智鑫	恰同学少年
2007	26th	Wang Gang 王刚	玉碎
2007	26th	Zhang Fengyi 张丰毅	西圣地
2007	26th	Chen Jianbin 陈建斌	乔家大院
2007	26th	Hou Yong 侯勇	陈赓大将
2007	26th	Zhang Guoli 张国立	亲兄热弟
2007	26th	Sun Honglei 孙红雷	半路夫妻
2005	25th	Chen Baoguo 陈宝国	汉武大帝
2005	25th	Zhang Fengyi 张丰毅	历史的天空
2004	24th	Chen Jianbin 陈建斌	结婚十年
2004	24th	You Yong 侯勇	大染坊
2004	24th	Tang Guoqiang 唐国强	延安颂
2004	24th	He Bing 何冰	浪漫的事
2004	24th	Ge Zhijun 戈治均	浪漫的事
2004	24th	Tong Dawei 佟大为	Goddess of Mercy 玉观音
2004	24th	Jiang Wu 姜武	Vancombers 别了，温哥华
2004	24th	Wang Xueqi 王学圻	归途如虹
2004	24th	Li Youbin 李幼斌	江山
2004	24th	Dong Yong 董勇	亲情树
2004	24th	Liu Jin 刘劲	延安颂
2003	23rd	Li Baotain 李保田	神医喜来乐
2003	23rd	Cheng Yu 程煜	'希望的田野
2003	23rd	Gao Ming 高明	誓言无声
2003	23rd	Du Yulu 杜雨露	云淡天高
2003	23rd	Wang Gang 王刚	铁齿铜牙纪晓岚（第二部）
2003	23rd	Zhang Guoli 张国立	铁齿铜牙纪晓岚（第二部）
2003	23rd	Fan Wei 范伟	Liu Laogen II 刘老根（第二部）
2003	23rd	Zhao Benshan 赵本山	Liu Laogen II 刘老根（第二部）
2003	23rd	Wang Zhiwen 王志文	DA师
2003	23rd	Fu Biao 傅彪	青衣
2002	22nd	Tang Guoqiang 唐国强	Long March 长征
2002	22nd	Sun Haiying 孙海英	激情燃烧的岁月
2002	22nd	Feng Guoqing 冯国庆	大哥
2002	22nd	Kong Xiangyu 孔祥玉	日出东方
2002	22nd	You Yong 尤勇	Great Judge 大法官
2002	22nd	Li Xuejian 李雪健	中国轨道
2002	22nd	Zhao Benshan 赵本山	Liu Laogen 刘老根
2002	22nd	Chen Daoming 陈道明	Kangxi Dynasty 康熙王朝
2002	22nd	Liu Zifeng 刘子枫	好人李司法
2002	22nd	Wang Qingxiang 王庆祥	天下粮仓
2001	21st	Liang Guanhua 梁冠华	贫嘴张大民的幸福生活
2001	21st	Yang Shulin 杨树林	公家人
2000	20th	Tang Guoqiang 唐国强	开国领袖毛泽东
2000	20th	Du Yulu杜雨露	突出重围

== 1990s ==
Year	Annual	Nominees	Titles
1999	19th	Wu Ruofu吴若甫	Holden Hands 牵手
1999	19th	Jiao Huang 焦晃	Yongzheng Dynasty 雍正王朝
1998	18th	Wei Qiming 魏启明	Ma Yinchu 马寅初
1998	18th	Jiang Hua 姜华	Chen Zhongyang 陈忠阳
1997	17th	Zhang Fengyi 张丰毅	和平年代
1996	16th	Tao Zeru 陶泽如	天网
1995	15th	Bao Guo'an 鲍国安	Romance of the Three Kingdoms 三国演义
1994	14th	Wang Zhiwen 王志文	To Satisfy and Die 过把瘾
1993	13th	Gao Ming 高明	擎天柱
1992	12th	Gao Qiang 高强	Zhao Shangzhi 赵尚志
1991	11th	Chen Daoming 陈道明	Fortress Besieged 围城
1990	10th	Yan Xiang 严翔	Shanghai Morning 上海的早晨

== 1980s ==
Year	Annual	Nominees	Titles
1989	9th	Chen Daoming	The Last Emperor 末代皇帝
1988	8th	Li Baotian	葛掌柜
1987	7th	Hou Yongsheng 侯永生	Nurhaci 努尔哈赤
1986	6th	Li Fazeng 李法曾	Zhuge Liang 诸葛亮
1985	5th	Chen Jianfei 陈剑飞	Night of Harbin 夜幕下的哈尔滨
1984	4th	Wei Beiyuan 位北原	燃烧的心
1984	4th	Tian Chengren	道是无情却有情
