= Ming Dynasty in 1566 =

- DVD cover art
- Also known as: Ming Dynasty 1566
- 大明王朝1566
- Genre: Historical drama
- Written by: Liu Heping
- Directed by: Zhang Li
- Presented by: Ouyang Changlin; Wang Wenling; Peng Tielin
- Starring: Chen Baoguo; Huang Zhizhong; Wang Qingxiang; Yan Ni; Wang Yajie; Guo Dongwen; Zheng Yu; Zhang Zijian
- Opening theme: "Efficient Governance is of Paramount Importance" (治世民为天) by Tan Weiwei
- Ending theme: "Clear and Open Skies" (海阔天青) by Tan Jing
- Composers: Liu Jian; Han Wei; Zhao Jiping
- Country of origin: China
- Original language: Mandarin
- No. of episodes: 46

Production
- Producer: Chi Xiaoning
- Production location: China
- Running time: ≈45 minutes per episode

Original release
- Network: Hunan TV; CCTV

Ming Dynasty in 1566 (大明王朝1566) is a Chinese historical television series based on the events during the reign of the Jiajing Emperor of the Ming dynasty from 1521 to 1567. Starring Chen Baoguo as the Jiajing Emperor and Huang Zhizhong as Hai Rui, the series was first broadcast on Hunan TV in China in 2007.

== Synopsis ==
The series is set in 16th-century China during the reign of the Jiajing Emperor of the Ming dynasty. For the past 20 years, the emperor has devoted his time to practising Taoism in pursuit of immortality, leaving the corrupt official Yan Song and his supporters in control of the government. Yan Song's abuses of power have stirred up widespread discontent at all levels of the government, with many calling for him to be removed from office. Hai Rui, an upright official, is one of the few who dare to stand up to corruption.

== Cast ==
- Chen Baoguo as the Jiajing Emperor
- Huang Zhizhong as Hai Rui
- Ni Dahong as Yan Song
- Zhang Zhijian as Yan Shifan
- Guo Guangping as Prince Yu
- Yan Ni as Consort Li
- Xiao Zhu as Xu Jie
- Liu Yubin as Gao Gong
- Guo Dongwen as Zhang Juzheng
- Wang Qingxiang as Hu Zongxian
- Xu Guangming as Lü Fang
- Liu Liwei as Chen Hong
- Wang Jinsong as Yang Jinshui
- Zhao Yong as Huang Jin
- Xu Chengfeng as Feng Bao
- Zheng Yu as Wang Yongji
- Xu Min as Zhao Zhenji
- Gan Yu as Zheng Michang
- Wang Rong as He Maocai
- Chen Zhihui as Qi Jiguang
- Wang Yajie as Yunniang
- Tan Kai as Gao Hanwen
- Zhao Lixin as Shen Yishi
- Zhu Xiaojuan as Hai Rui's mother
- Hu Lingling as Hai Rui's wife
- Lin Haiyun as Hai Rui's daughter
- Zhang Zijian as Li Shizhen
- Jin Song as Qi Dazhu
- Miura Kenichi as Inoue Jūsanro

== Episodes ==
No. overall	No. in season	Title	Directed by	Written by	Original release date
1	1	"Episode 1"	Zhang Li	Liu Heping	2007
In the 39th year of Emperor Jiajing's reign, a snowless winter signals misfortune. Zhou Yunyi, an official who criticizes corruption and excessive spending, is executed, sparking outrage. As the Emperor prays for snow, factions within the court clash over fiscal reforms, while the birth of an imperial grandson brings hope. The approval of a controversial mulberry field policy sets the stage for peasant unrest.
2	2	"Episode 2"	Zhang Li	Liu Heping	2007
During Emperor Jiajing's reign, the birth of his first grandson shifts the delicate balance of power in the court. Eunuch Lü Fang sends Feng Bao to the Prince of Yu's residence to guide the imperial heir, laying the groundwork for future political maneuvers. Meanwhile, officials Xu Jie, Gao Gong, and Zhang Juzheng work with the Prince to counter the Yan faction’s harmful "rice-to-mulberry" policy, which causes famine and unrest in Zhejiang. Local uprisings, led by farmers like Qi Dazhu, escalate as corrupt officials profit from silk trade deals, while Governor Hu Zongxian secretly opposes the policy, creating further tension within the court.
3	3	"Episode 3"	Zhang Li	Liu Heping	2007
Emperor Jiajing’s visit to the Prince of Yu’s residence rekindles his affection for his grandson, leading to grand gestures like granting silk rewards. Meanwhile, Yan Song uses the opportunity to test the Emperor’s stance by presenting Governor Hu Zongxian’s memorial, while Yan Shifan, seeking quick gains, conspires to flood farmland in nine counties for cheap land acquisition. Their actions lead to disastrous consequences, forcing Hu Zongxian, Qi Jiguang, and Tan Lun to mobilize troops and work with locals to mitigate the damage. The flooding spares seven counties but devastates two, thwarting Yan Shifan’s land-grab scheme.
