= Li Wei the Magistrate =

- Taiwan DVD cover
- Also known as: Li Wei Becomes an Official; The Legend of Li Wei
- Traditional Chinese: 李衛當官
- Simplified Chinese: 李卫当官
- Hanyu Pinyin: Lǐ Wèi Dāng Guān
- Genre: Historical; Comedy
- Written by: Liu Heping; Su Bin; Yuyue
- Directed by: Zheng Jun; Chen Lie
- Starring: Xu Zheng; Chen Hao; Jiao Huang; Tang Guoqiang; Du Zhiguo
- Music by: Wu Wai Lap
- Country of origin: China
- Original language: Mandarin
- No. of episodes: 32

Production
- Producer: Jiang Xuerou
- Editor: Gu Guoliang
- Running time: 45 minutes

Related
- Yongzheng Dynasty (1999)

Li Wei the Magistrate (Chinese: 李衛當官; pinyin: Lǐ Wèi Dāng Guān) is a 2001 Chinese television historical comedy-drama starring Xu Zheng as Li Wei, an illiterate county magistrate who would become one of the most prominent officials of 18th century Imperial China.

The drama is usually considered the sidequel of the 1999 television series Yongzheng Dynasty with most of the main cast reprising their roles. However, whereas Yongzheng Dynasty closely followed historical events, Li Wei the Magistrate is almost completely fictional and includes a significant amount of comedy.

A commercial success, the show spawned three sequels: Li Wei the Magistrate II (2004), Li Wei Resigns from Office (2005), and Li Wei the Magistrate III (2010).

== Plot synopsis ==
In the reign of the Kangxi Emperor, censor Yue Zifeng is attacked and murdered by order of the Crown Prince Yinreng when he begins exposing corrupt magistrates with ties to him for embezzling several million taels of relief funds. Yue's daughter Siying and son Xiaoman barely escape from their assailants and go on the run with the former disguising herself as a man. Due to the lack of funds, many peasants are left homeless while several thousands die. Li Wei and his mother are amongst the many displaced refugees who arrive in Jiangnan where they meet Siying and Xiaoman. When his mother is arrested and sentenced to be executed for stealing rice, Li impersonates an imperial censor and dupes the presiding magistrates there into setting her free. He later learns of Siying's real identity and promises to help her arrest her father's murderers. His actions are witnessed by the emperor's sons, Yinzhen and Yinxiang, and their retainer, Nian Gengyao, the real censors sent to Jiangnan by imperial decree. Yinzhen is impressed by Li who, despite his unorthodox (if not downright illicit) means of doing things, is motivated by noble intentions. At the same time, the two princes see Li as potentially useful for their cause in finding Yue Zifeng's murderers and retrieving the embezzled silver, as many of the Jiangnan magistrates are political allies to the Crown Prince and Yinsi, with whom Yinzhen is locked in a bitter political rivalry. Following the takedown of the corrupt magistrates and retrieval of the funds, Li is personally appointed by Yinzhen to be a county magistrate and later on, sent to manage Suyang Province by the Kangxi Emperor.

While in Suyang, Li is enraged to learn that the peasants are suffering as the officials there heavily tax them. When he learns twenty million silver taels have been embezzled, he vows to retrieve them. However, he struggles due to his illiteracy and lack of court knowledge, as well as his powerlessness in investigating the magistrates whose powerful political ties allow them to evade questioning and continue exploiting with impunity, resulting in Siying and Xiaoman employing the assistance of a reclusive scholar, Ren Nanpo. Under his guidance, Li sets in motion events that cause a domino-effect which ultimately culminate in the Crown Prince being deposed.

== Production and broadcasts ==
Filming began in October 2000 in Beijing. The series was first broadcast in Taiwan in August 2001. In Mainland China, copyrights were sold to many TV stations, which began broadcasting it from September 2001 to 2002. The show ran for thirty-two episodes.

- Taiwan - Sanlih E-Television — August 2001
- China - Tianjin Television — September 2001
- Hong Kong - Asia Television — January 2002

== Cast ==
- Xu Zheng as Li Wei
- Chen Hao as Yue Siying
- Tang Guoqiang as Yinzhen
- Jiao Huang as the Kangxi Emperor
- Xu Min as Yinreng
- Wang Huichun as Yinsi
- Wang Hui as Yinxiang
- Du Zhiguo as Nian Gengyao
- Li Xiaoyan as Li Wei's mother
- Yang Haofei as Yue Xiaoman
- Sun Baoguang as Feng Yueqing
- Li Yi as Ren Nanpo
- Wen Bo as Gu Pan'er
- Li Qian as Shiliu

== Reception ==
The show was well-received. It has an audience score of 7.7 out of 10 on Douban with many praising its writing and acting. For his performance as Li, Xu became known as "the Rookie Comedy King" and in Taiwan, was dubbed "Mainland China's Dicky Cheung". Lead actress Chen Hao, then still a college student and relatively unknown, saw her popularity skyrocket with the drama's airing.
