= Du Zhiguo =

Chinese actor

- Born: 29 September 1954 (age 71); Hebei, China
- Education: Central Academy of Drama
- Occupation: Actor
- Years active: 1980s–present
- Spouse(s): Yang Li (1970s / 1980s–1990s); Zhao Na (2004–)
- Children: Du Chun (son)

Chinese name
- Traditional Chinese: 杜志國
- Simplified Chinese: 杜志国
Transcriptions
Standard Mandarin
- Hanyu Pinyin: Dù Zhìguó

Du Zhiguo (born 29 September 1954) is a Chinese actor.

== Life ==
Du joined the performing arts troupe of Tianjin Military District (天津警备区) at the age of 16. He initially learnt dancing before joining the drama class. Seven years later, he moved to Xingtai and then to Baoding. As drama was not very popular at that time, Du travelled to Beijing in search of opportunities to start an acting career. He became more familiar to audiences after portraying Nian Gengyao in the 1998 television series Yongzheng Dynasty.

Du's first wife, Yang Li (杨丽), is a dancer. Their son Du Chun is also an actor. Du and Yang divorced later. In 2004, Du married his second wife, actress Zhao Na (赵娜).

== Filmography ==
=== Film ===
Year	Title	Role	Notes
1980	Gezi Shu 鸽子树		
1985	Xiangxi Jiaofei Ji 湘西剿匪记		
1987	Moku Xia De Feibang 魔窟下的匪帮		
1987	Wo Shi Yang Zhi Tou 我是羊之头		
1988	Happy Hero 欢乐英雄.阴阳界	Sanfu	
1989	The Night Robbery 夜盗珍妃墓	Zhang Chen	

Year	Title	Role	Notes
1989	Westbound Convict Train 西行囚车	Zheng Zhongli	
1996	Qi Qi Shibian 七七事变	He Jifeng	
2000	Weicheng 1938 危城1938	Shen Jiaqi	
2001	The Sino-Dutch War 1661 英雄郑成功	Zheng Zhilong	
2011	The Founding of a Party 建党伟业	Policeman	
2015	Time to Love		
2015	The Dead End		

=== Television ===
Year	Title	Role	Notes
1984	Bingtang Hulu 冰糖葫芦		
1985	Di Hou Wu Gong Dui 敌后武工队	Liu Kuisheng	
1986	Hong Zhiyin 红指印		
1986	Caoxie Siling 草鞋司令	Kuomintang officer	
1987	Chihun 赤魂	Red Army officer	
1987	Huangyadong Baowei Zhan 黄崖洞保卫战		
1990	Xue Chao 血钞		
1991	Zhuizong 追踪	Police officer	
1991	Chezhan 车站	Heizi	
1992	Mingtian You Yu 明天有雨		
1992	Shiyan 誓言	Fang Zhengzhi	
1993	Xue Zhen 雪阵	Red Army officer	
1995	A Sentimental Story 一场风花雪月的事	Wu Lichang	
1997	Dongzhou Lieguo Zhanguo Pian 东周列国·战国篇	Yue Yi	
1997	Beifang Gushi 北方故事	Laoda	
1997	Yongzheng Dynasty 雍正王朝	Nian Gengyao	
1998	Heilian 黑脸	Zheng Shiren	
1999	Jingtian Da Jie'an 惊天大劫案	Guo Qing	
1999	Tuchu Chongwei 突出重围	Huang Xing'an	
1999	Da Suidao 大隧道		
2000	Luanshi Piaoping 乱世飘萍	Lu Buping	
2001	Qiu Xiang 秋香	Prince Ning	
2002	Tianxia Liangcang 天下粮仓	Lu Zhuo	
2002	Guangwu Dadi 光武大帝	Yan You	
2002	Gongmin Liangxin 公民良心	Ye Jiaqi	
2002	Yundan Tiangao 云淡天高	Han Yuan	
2002	Knife of Guanxi 关西无极刀	Daoxian	
2002	Li Wei the Magistrate 李卫当官	Nian Gengyao	
2003	Absolute Control 绝对控制	Tang Zijie	
2003	Suitang Yingxiong Zhuan 隋唐英雄传	Li Yuan	
2003	Lian Cheng Jue 连城诀	Wan Zhenshan	
2003	Sunrise Sunset 日出日落	Ding Ruhu	
2004	Da'an Zhuizong 大案追踪	Gai Xiongfei	
2004	Da Qing Yushi 大清御史	Li Shiyao	
2004	Li Wei the Magistrate II 李卫当官II	Nian Gengyao	
2004	Dandelion 蒲公英	Wang Dong	
2004	Da Longmai 大龙脉	Li Hongzhang	
2005	Da Song Tixing Guan 大宋提刑官	Yuan Jie	
2005	Yanhua Sanyue 烟花三月	Oboi	
2005	Feichang Jingshi 非常警示	Chen Shaofeng	
2005	Dang Hunyin Zouxiang Jintou 当婚姻走向尽头	Shan's father	
2006	Nancheng Grudge 大河颂	Gan Chenglong	
2006	Initiating Prosperity 开创盛世	Yu Zhi	
2006	Carol of Zhenguan 贞观长歌	Hou Junji	
2006	The Legend and the Hero 封神榜之凤鸣岐山	Su Hu	
2006	The Sword and the Chess of Death 魔剑生死棋	Jianzun	
2006	Huan Zi Cheng Long 换子成龙	Wu Liangbi	
2006	Who With Fights 谁与争锋	Chen Haocheng	

Year	Title	Role	Notes
2007	The Legend of the Banner Hero 大旗英雄传	Leng Yifeng	
2007	Ming Dynasty 大明天下	Yang Lian	
2007	Fleeing by Night 夜奔	Luo Jiashan	
2007	Qingchun Zheng Bu Zou 青春正步走	Hu Mingxuan	
2007	Jiancha Juzhang 监察局长	Li Zhi'an	
2007	Feiqin Fuzi 非亲父子	Qiao Shengli	
2007	Fengchuan Mudan 凤穿牡丹	Yu Haoting	
2007	Jianghu Wangshi 江湖往事	Long	
2007	Paiqiu Nüjiang 排球女将	Principal Li	
2007	Chuangye 创业	Lü Zong	
2008	Seven Days that Shook the World 震撼世界的七日	Wang Yuanzheng	
2008	In Enemy Camp for 18 Years 敌营十八年	Teng Qian	
2008	Jianghu Brothers 江湖兄弟	Tang Yingming	
2008	Zou Xi Kou 走西口	Liu Yidao	
2008	Da'an Zhuizong 大案追踪	Wen Deliang	
2009	The Legend and the Hero 2 封神榜之武王伐纣	Su Hu	
2009	Peace Mission 和平使命	Xiao Yunpeng	
2009	In Enemy Camp for 18 Years II 敌营十八年II虎胆雄心	Teng Qian	
2009	The Sea 沧海	Lu Xinquan	
2009	Junli 军礼	Zeng Xinxiong	
2009	Fengyu Diaohua Lou 风雨雕花楼	Gu Hanmo	
2009	Laoshao Yemen Da Guizi 老少爷们打鬼子	Liu Kuisheng	
2009	The Soldier 战士	Gu Ruochong	
2009	Chaoqi Liangjiang 潮起两江	Yu Shunjiang	
2009	Da Zhanggui 大掌柜	Chen Jiu's father	
2010	Lihua Lei 梨花泪	Xiao Guilun	
2010	Jianghu Juelian 江湖绝恋	Ji Bokang	
2010	Plain Shots 平原枪声	Su Jinrong	
2010	Liehuo Hongyan 烈火红岩	Gu Shaoliang	
2010	Shanghai Shanghai 上海上海	Wang Dingsong	
2010	Natural Enemy 天敌	Chen Ju	
2010	Tian Zhen 天阵	Liu Kun	
2010	Zuihou Fangxian 最后防线	Zhao Yuanpu	
2010	Chuang Tianxia 闯天下	Qin Xiaoshou	
2010	Jiuren Yiming 救人一命	Ye Yindong	
2010	Jizhan Jiangnan 激战江南	Gang boss	
2011	Cong Jiangjun Dao Shibing 从将军到士兵	Tang Zuli	
2011	Yaoyuan De Xingfu 遥远的幸福	Huang Man	
2011	Zhan Leishen 战雷神	Zhou Dama	
2011	Dihuo 地火	Shang Qingcheng	
2011	Heroes of Sui and Tang Dynasties 1 & 2 隋唐英雄	Li Yuan	
2011	Wo De Kangzhan 我的抗战	Miao Feng	
2011	Duyou Yingxiong 独有英雄	Zhou Yiwei	
2011	Xue Dingshan 薛丁山		
2011	Zhui Zhui Zhui 追追追		
2012	Wo De Chuanqi Laopo 我的传奇老婆		
2012	Wuxing Hongqi Yingfeng Piaoyang 2 五星红旗迎风飘扬2		
2012	Lingdu Jiaoliang 零度较量		
2014	Deng Xiaoping at History's Crossroads 历史转折中的邓小平	Party functionary	
2018	My Story for You 为了你，我愿意热爱整个世界		
