= Eryue He =

Chinese writer

Ling Jiefang
- 凌解放
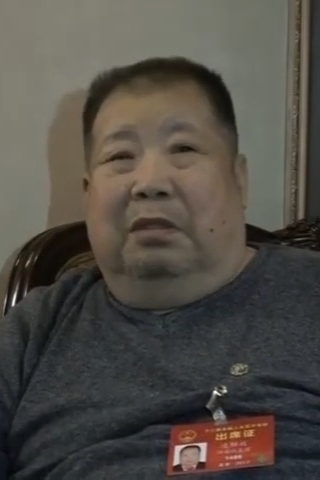
- Born: 3 November 1945; Xiyang County, Shanxi, China
- Died: 15 December 2018 (aged 73); Beijing, China
- Occupation: Novelist
- Writing career
- Pen name: Eryue He
- Language: Chinese
- Genre: Historical fiction
- Notable works: Kangxi Emperor; Yongzheng Emperor; Qianlong Emperor

Chinese name
- Chinese: 凌解放
Transcriptions
Standard Mandarin
- Hanyu Pinyin: Líng Jiěfàng
- Wade–Giles: Ling Chieh-fang

Ling Jiefang (Chinese: 凌解放; 3 November 1945 – 15 December 2018), better known by his pen name Eryue He (Chinese: 二月河; lit. 'February River'), was a Chinese historical fiction writer. He is best known for writing biographical novels of three Qing dynasty emperors (Kangxi, Yongzheng and Qianlong), all of which have been adapted into award-winning television series.

He was the dean of College of Liberal Arts of Zhengzhou University. He was a delegate to the 12th National People's Congress and the 18th National Congress of the Chinese Communist Party. He was a member of the China Writers Association.

== Biography ==
Ling was born in Xiyang County, Shanxi. His father Ling Erwen (Chinese: 凌尔文) was the party secretary of Xiyang Committee of the Chinese Communist Party (CCP). His mother Ma Cuilan (Chinese: 马翠兰) was the chairwoman of CCP Xiyang Women's Federation. He moved to Nanyang, Henan, and settled there with his parents. He graduated from Nanyang No. 3 High School. He served in the People's Liberation Army for ten years from 1968 to 1978. In 1978 he became an official in the Propaganda Department of the CCP Nanyang Municipal Committee. His inspiration for the emperor biographies came from his study of Dream of the Red Chamber, one of the Four Great Classical Novels of Chinese literature. He is also a member of the standing committee of the Chinese Redology Association, with a group of people devoting time and effort on the study of the aforementioned novel.

Ling began writing his first novel, The Great Kangxi Emperor, in 1984 and later published Yongzheng Emperor and Qianlong Emperor as part of the same historical fiction series. The hugely popular books follow three generations of emperors during the Qing dynasty (1644–1911) and feature tales of corruption, invasions and rivalries between royal siblings. The three novels were adapted into popular TV series in the late 1990s and early 2000s starring Chen Daoming, Tang Guoqiang and Siqin Gaowa.

== Selected works ==
- Kangxi Emperor (1984–1988), adapted into the 2001 TV series Kangxi Dynasty
- Yongzheng Emperor (1990–1992), adapted into the 1997 TV series Yongzheng Dynasty
- Qianlong Emperor (1994–1996), adapted into the 2002 TV series Qianlong Dynasty
- Hu Xueyan (胡雪岩, wrote with Xue Jiazhu)
- Meditation in front of Buddha Statue (佛像前的沉吟, essay)
- Ren Jian Shi (人间世, essay)
- Suixing Suiyuan (随性随缘, essay)
- Miyun Buyu (密云不雨, autobiography)
