= Jiao Huang =

Chinese actor (born 1936)

- 焦晃
- Born: 8 July 1936 (age 90); Beijing, China
- Education: Shanghai Theatre Academy
- Occupation: Actor
- Years active: 1957-present
- Agent: Shanghai Dramatic Arts Centre
- Spouse: Chen Xiaoli
- Children: 2

Jiao Huang (Chinese: 焦晃; pinyin: Jiāo Huǎng; born 8 July 1936) is a Chinese actor best known for his roles as the Kangxi Emperor in Yongzheng Emperor, the Qianlong Emperor in Qianlong Dynasty, and Emperor Jing of Han in The Emperor in Han Dynasty.

== Early life and education ==
Jiao was born in Beijing, on July 8, 1936, while his ancestral home in Zhangjiakou, Hebei. His father, Jiao Shufan, graduated from Yenching University and was a teacher at the University of International Business and Economics after the establishment of the Communist State in 1949. Due to the Second Sino-Japanese War, his family moved to Shanghai. In 1955, he was accepted to Shanghai Theatre Academy, where he graduated in 1959. After university, he was assigned to Shanghai Youth Drama Troupe.

== Acting career ==
Jiao first came to public attention in 1958 at the age of 22, appearing on Xie Jin's Small stories in Big Waves.

In 1966, Mao Zedong launched the Cultural Revolution, Jiao was brought to be persecuted and forced to work in the fields instead of acting.

In 1975, he got a small role as a spy in the war film Memorable Battle.

Jiao received his first leading role in a feature film called Desert Camel (1978).

In 1983, he starred with Wang Hui and Guo Weilin in Pioneers' Footprints.

Jiao became widely known to audiences with Antony and Cleopatra (1984), a tragedy by William Shakespeare.

In 1986, he was cast in Bible for Girls, which is set to premiere at the same year.

In 1987, he earned critical acclaim for his performance as He Jingming in Engineers, for which he received a Best Supporting Actor at the 8th Flying Apsaras Awards.

He co-starred with You Yong and Song Jia in Spacious Courtyard, adapted from Qiong Yao's romance novel of the same title.

In 1991, he played the lead role in Xie Fei's drama film The Sun om the Roof of the World.

In 1993, he was cast as Ding Han in First Attraction, opposite Xi Meijuan, Xu Huanshan and Zheng Qianlong.

Jiao's role as the Kangxi Emperor on the historical television series Yongzheng Dynasty (1997) brought him to the attention of a wider audience; he received an Outstanding Supporting Actor at the 17th China TV Golden Eagle Awards and won a Best Actor at the 19th Flying Sky Television Awards.

In 2000, he played the role of Zhong Chaolin in Hu Mei's television series Loyal, for which he received an Audience's Choice for Actor nomination at the 20th China TV Golden Eagle Awards.

In 2002, he portrayed the Qianlong Emperor in the historical television series Qianlong Dynasty. That same year, he had key supporting role as Kangxi Emperor in Li Wei the Magistrate.

He had a supporting role as Emperor Jing of Han in the historical television series The Emperor in Han Dynasty (2004).

In 2006, he earned an Outstanding Supporting Actor nomination at the 27th Flying Sky Television Awards for his performance as Li Guorong in Return In Glory.

Jiao made a guest appearance as Laozi on Confucius, a biographical film starring Chow Yun-fat as Confucius.

In 2013, Jiao played the title role in All Quiet in Peking, co-starring Liu Ye, Chen Baoguo and Ni Dahong.

He appeared as Qianlong Emperor in Hu Mei's Enter the Forbidden City (2019).

== Personal life ==
Jiao was married three times. His third wife, Chen Xiaoli (陈小丽), was a reporter of Wen Wei Po. They have a daughter. His son is an American citizen.

== Filmography ==
=== Film ===
Year	English title	Chinese title	Role	Notes
1975	Memorable Battle	难忘的战斗	Liu Zhiren	
1978	Desert Camel	沙漠驼铃	Zhu Guanghan	
1983	Pioneers' Footprints	拓荒者的足迹	Xin Qiming	
1986	Bible for Girls	女儿经	Nie Weiping	
1989	Spacious Courtyard	庭院深深	Shi Shujun	
1991	The Sun om the Roof of the World	世界屋脊的太阳	Fang Zheng	
1993	First Attraction	第一诱惑	Ding Han	
1997	790 Hotline	790热线	Professor Song	
2010	Confucius	孔子	Laozi	
2019	Enter the Forbidden City	进京城	Qianlong Emperor	

=== Television ===
Year	English title	Chinese title	Role	Notes
1985	Left by the Lake	遗落在湖畔	The Writer	
1979	Engineers	工程师们	He Jingming	
1992	Zhu Ziqing	朱自清	Wen Yiduo	
1999	Yongzheng Dynasty	雍正王朝	Kangxi Emperor	
2001	Loyal	忠诚	Zhong Chaolin	
2002	Motor City	汽车城	Pan Shude	
2002	Li Wei the Magistrate	李卫当官	Kangxi Emperor	
2003	Qianlong Dynasty	乾隆王朝	Qianlong Emperor	
2005	The Emperor in Han Dynasty	汉武大帝	Emperor Jing of Han	
2006	Return In Glory	荣归	Li Guorong	
2014	All Quiet in Peking	北平无战事	He Qicang	

=== Drama ===
Year	English title	Chinese title	Role	Notes
1957	Much Ado About Nothing	无事生非		
1984	Antony and Cleopatra	安东尼与克莉奥佩特拉		
2009	The Government Inspector	钦差大臣		

== Film and TV Awards ==
Year	Nominated work	Award	Category	Result	Notes
1981		1st Shanghai Drama Festival	Excellent Performance Award	Won	
1988	Engineers	8th Flying Apsaras Awards	Best Supporting Actor	Won	
1997		3rd Golden Lion Award		Won	
1999	Yongzheng Dynasty	17th China TV Golden Eagle Awards	Outstanding Supporting Actor	Won	
1999	Yongzheng Dynasty	19th Flying Sky Television Awards	Best Actor	Won	
2002	Beneath the Red Banner	Drama Art Award	Best Actor	Won	
2002	Loyal	20th China TV Golden Eagle Awards	Audience's Choice for Actor	Nominated	
2009	Return In Glory	27th Flying Sky Television Awards	Outstanding Supporting Actor	Nominated	
2013		23rd Shanghai Magnolia Drama Performance Art Award	Special Contribution Award	Won	
2017		Golden Phoenix Awards	Special Recognition Award	Won	
