= 7th Golden Eagle Awards =

Chinese TV awards ceremony in 1989

The 7th Golden Eagle Awards were held June October 15, 1989, in Hangzhou, Zhejiang province. Nominees and winners are listed below, winners are in bold.

== Best Television Series ==
not awarded this year

- The Last Emperor/末代皇帝
- Spring House/家春秋
- Big Hotel/大酒店

== Best Lead Actor in a Television Series ==
- **Chen Daoming for The Last Emperor**

== Best Lead Actress in a Television Series ==
- **Xu Ya for Spring House**

== Best Supporting Actor in a Television Series ==
- **Chen Yude for unknown**

== Best Supporting Actress in a Television Series ==
not awarded this year
