= Liu Heping =

Chinese screenwriter and novelist

- 刘和平
- Born: 1953; Hengyang, Hunan, China
- Occupation(s): Screenwriter, Novelist
- Notable work: Yongzheng Dynasty; Ming Dynasty in 1566; Li Wei the Magistrate

Liu Heping (Chinese: 刘和平; born 1953) is a Chinese screenwriter and novelist who is best known for his historical dramas.

== Biography ==
Liu was from Shaodong and born in Hengyang, Hunan Province, southern China in 1953. His father was a playwright, and his mother was an opera actor. His dramatisation of the final years of the Jiajing Emperor, Ming Dynasty in 1566, was released as a TV drama and a series of novels in 2007. In 2014, his drama about the Chinese Civil War, All Quiet in Peking, was also released in both TV and novel formats. Liu won the award for best screenplay for All Quiet in Peking at the 30th Feitian Awards.

== Works ==
=== Notable works (Chinese) ===
- Ming Dynasty in 1566 (2007)
- All Quiet in Peking (2014)

=== Works in translation (English) ===
- 1566: The Taoist Emperor (Translated by Wen Huang) (2020)
- 1566: The Imperial Governor (Translated by Wen Huang) (2021)
- 1566: The Chief Eunuch (Translated by Wen Huang) (2022)
- 1566: The Emperor's Nemesis (Translated by Wen Huang) (2022)
- All Quiet in Peking: Under Turbulent Skies (Translated by Teng Jimeng) (2022)
- All Quiet in Peking: Behind Closed Doors (Translated by Teng Jimeng) (2022)

=== Upcoming works in translation (English) ===
- All Quiet in Peking: Final Curtain Call (Translated by Christopher Payne) (2023)
