= Tian Wenjing =

Chinese mandarin

Viceroy of Eastern Rivers
- In office 1728–1732
- Preceded by: himself as Viceroy of Southern Rivers
- Succeeded by: Wang Shijun

Viceroy of Southern Rivers
- In office 1727–1728
- Preceded by: vacant (last: Liu Qingtai)
- Succeeded by: himself as Viceroy of Eastern Rivers

Governor of Henan
- In office 1724–1731
- Preceded by: Shi Wenchao
- Succeeded by: Zhang Yuanhuai

Personal details
- Born: 1662
- Died: December 24, 1732 (aged 69–70)
- Education: Imperial Academy (guozijian)
- Occupation: politician
- courtesy name: Yiguang (抑光)
- posthumous name: Duansu (端肅)

Military service
- Allegiance: Qing dynasty
- Branch/service: Han Chinese Plain Yellow Banner

Tian Wenjing (simplified Chinese: 田文镜; traditional Chinese: 田文鏡; pinyin: Tián Wénjìng; 1662 – December 24, 1732), styled Yiguang (抑光), was a prominent mandarin who lived during the reign of the Kangxi and Yongzheng Emperors of the Qing Dynasty.

Tian hailed from the Plain Yellow Banner of the Han Chinese military under the Qing Dynasty command. He was schooled in the Imperial Academy, and became a county official at the age of 21. In the last years of Kangxi's reign, Tian worked as a scholar in the imperial palace. It is not clear how his relationship with Yongzheng began. In 1724 after Yongzheng ascended the throne Tian was named governor of Henan, and was promoted to Governor-General (zongdu) several years later. He then served as Governor-General of Shandong, then Governor General of Beihe (北河总督). Yongzheng held Tian in very high regard, writing that Tian devoted his life to serving the court and the state, and was morally upright and just. Tian retired in 1730, citing fatigue and illness.

Tian was interred at the Western Qing tombs, a very special honour, given that the tombs were generally reserved for royalty.

== Popular culture ==
The 1998 hit TV series Yongzheng Dynasty depicted Tian as Yongzheng's foremost trusty fixer and lieutenant, being sent by Yongzheng to complete several missions in the south during flooding in the region. In the show, Tian's work in the south is used as a pretext for the eighth prince Yunsi to criticize the policies of Yongzheng. Historically, Wu Sidao (邬思道) or "Mr. Wu" actually served on the staff of Tian, but in the television series he was shown as Yongzheng's personal advisor prior to being recommended to Tian on advice from Li Wei. Tian also appeared in the 2002 TV series Grain Storage (天下粮仓) as a negative character.
