= Plain Yellow Banner =

Manchu military unit (1601–1912)

- Flag of the Plain Yellow Banner
- Active: 1601 – 1912
- Country: Later Jin; China
- Allegiance: Qing dynasty
- Type: Cavalry; Musketeers
- Part of: Eight Banners
- Commander: Nurhaci The Emperor

Plain Yellow Banner

Chinese name
- Traditional Chinese: 正黃旗
- Simplified Chinese: 正黄旗
Transcriptions
Standard Mandarin
- Hanyu Pinyin: zhènghuángqí

Mongolian name
- Mongolian Cyrillic: Шулуун шар хошуу

Manchu name
- Manchu script: ᡤᡠᠯᡠ ᠰᡠᠸᠠᠶᠠᠨ ᡤᡡᠰᠠ
- Möllendorff: gulu suwayan gūsa

The Plain Yellow Banner (Chinese: 正黃旗) was one of the Eight Banners of Manchu military and society during the Later Jin and Qing dynasty of China. The Plain Yellow Banner was one of three "upper" banner armies under the direct command of the emperor himself, and one of the four "right wing" banners. The Plain Yellow Banner was the original banner commanded personally by Nurhaci. The Plain Yellow Banner and the Bordered Yellow Banner were split from each other in 1615, when the troops of the original four banner armies (Yellow, Blue, Red, and White) were divided into eight by adding a bordered variant to each banner's design. After Nurhaci's death, his son Hong Taiji became khan, and took control of both yellow banners. Later, the Shunzhi Emperor took over the Plain White Banner after the death of his regent, Dorgon, to whom it previously belonged. From that point forward, the emperor directly controlled three "upper" banners (Plain Yellow, Bordered Yellow, and Plain White), as opposed to the other five "lower" banners.

The flag of the Plain Yellow Banner eventually became the basis of the Flag of the Qing dynasty.

== Notable people ==
- Nurhaci (founding khan of the Jurchen-led Later Jin dynasty)
- Hong Taiji (Manchu Prince, 8th son and heir of Nurhaci)
- Hooge, Prince Su (Manchu Prince, eldest son of Hong Taiji)
- Fulin (Manchu Prince, 9th son and heir of Hong Taiji)
- Kangxi Emperor (Manchu Prince, 3rd son and heir of Shunzhi Emperor)
- Hešeri Clan
- Sonin (Manchu noble of the Hešeri clan, 1st regent for the young Kangxi Emperor)
- Songgotu (Manchu Minister, son of Sonin)
- Yunsi (Manchu Prince, 8th son of Kangxi Emperor)
- Qishan (official), the Imperial Commissioner of the Qing during most of the First Opium War and the beginning of the Taiping Rebellion.
- Clan Nara
  - Consort Shu
- Tulišen
- Empress Xiaogongren, consort of the Kangxi Emperor
- Zu Dashou (Han)
- Geng Zhongming (Han)
- Tian Wenjing (Han)
- Imperial Noble Consort Shujia
- Noble Consort Jia
- Imperial Noble Consort Zhemin
- Empress Xiaojingcheng
- Consort Rong (Kangxi)
- Concubine Yi, consort of the Qianlong Emperor

== Notable clans ==
- Hešeri
- Geng
- Zu
- Tian
- Gūwalgiya
- Clan Nara
- Ayan Gioro
- Uya
- Borjigin
- Šumuru
- Magiya
- Donggo
- Yanja
- Cheng
- Wumit
- Zheng
- Zhou
- Wang
- Li
- Ejo

== Bibliography ==
- Elliott, Mark C. (2001), The Manchu Way: The Eight Banners and Ethnic Identity in Late Imperial China, Stanford University Press, ISBN 9780804746847
- Wakeman, Frederic Jr. (1985), The Great Enterprise: The Manchu Reconstruction of Imperial Order in Seventeenth-century China, Berkeley: University of California Press, ISBN 0520048040
