= Mingzhu =

Mingzhu (Chinese: 明珠; pinyin: Míngzhū) is a Chinese feminine given name. Notable people with the name include:

- Yin Mingzhu (1904–1989), Chinese actress
- Wu Mingzhu (born 1930), Chinese agronomist
- Dong Mingzhu (born 1954), Chinese businesswoman
- Li Mingzhu (born 1962), Chinese figure skater
