= Chen Hao (actress) =

Chinese actress, singer, and model

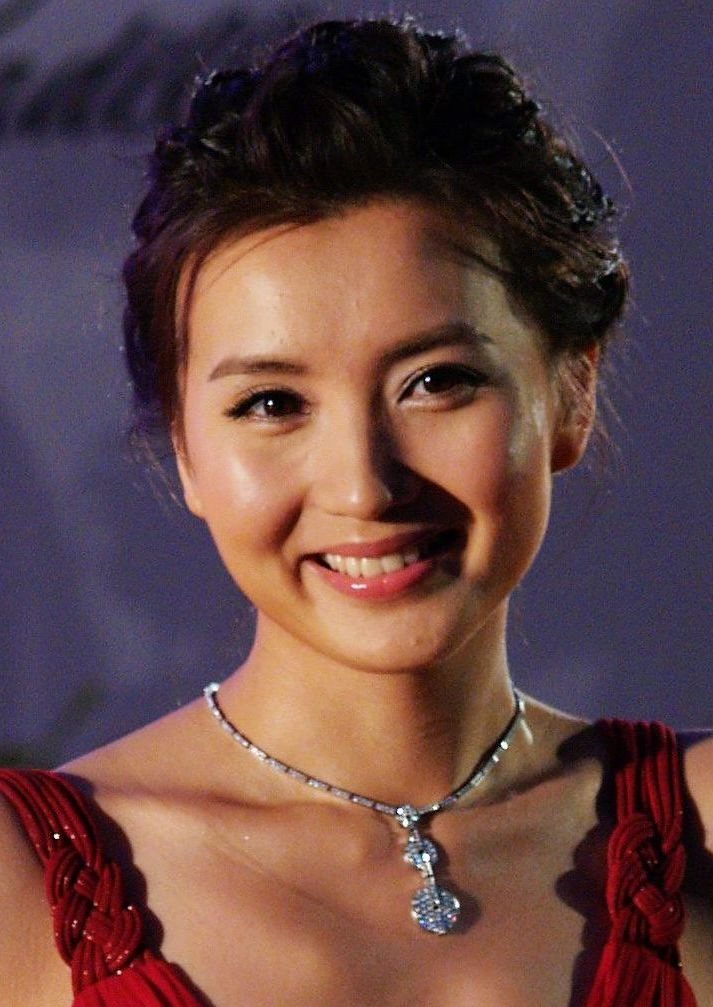
- Chen at the 2007 Shanghai International Film Festival
- Born: December 9, 1979 (age 46); Qingdao, Shandong, China
- Education: Central Academy of Drama
- Occupations: Actress, singer, model
- Years active: 1992–present
- Spouse: Liu Haifeng (2010–present)
- Children: 1

Chinese name
- Traditional Chinese: 陳好
- Simplified Chinese: 陈好
Transcriptions
Standard Mandarin
- Hanyu Pinyin: Chén Hǎo
Yue: Cantonese
- Jyutping: Can4 Hou3

Chen Hao (born December 9, 1979) is a Chinese actress, singer, and model.

== Early life and career ==
Chen Hao, came into limelight in 1998 after the release of her award winning film the Postman in the Mountains in which she revealed her ample acting ability on screen. Her leading role in the TV drama Li Wei the Magistrate (2000/2001) made her popular with the Chinese public. Chen followed this with a role in a TV comedy play called the Pink Ladies in Taiwan. The movie proved a blockbuster among the Chinese community living across Asia.

Chen, as one of the heroines, in the Pink Ladies, showed her acting prowess in the role of a sensuous woman given to exploiting the men, with TV films like the 2003 Demi-Gods and Semi-Devils.

Chen also started to include singing as a part of her career. Her maiden music album hit the market in 2005, produced by Japanese producer Tetsuya Komuro. Her album Chen Hao, bagged the Channel V's the most popular female singer award in 2006.

A graduate from the Central Academy of Drama with majors in acting in 1997, more awards seem to come her way as she was again decorated with the Jury Award at the 2009 Seoul TV Festival for her outstanding performance in the film Live a Luxurious and Dispassionate Life. She portrays the character of a permissive woman given to gambling and an indulgent life.

Chen, in a popularity online poll made by Sohu in 2012, was able to collect over one million votes pronouncing her the "Most Beautiful Woman" in China. She has also appeared in magazines such as Vogue, in its Taiwan edition.

== Personal life ==
Born in the coastal city of Qingdao, Shandong province, Chen is married to a business tycoon, David Liu Haifeng. She gave birth to a girl in May 2011.

== Filmography ==
=== Film ===
Year	Title	Role	Notes
1992	Requital 五湖四海	Hsin	
1995	Trouble Maker 蜡笔小小生		
1997	Surveillance 埋伏		
1999	Postmen in the Mountains 那山、那人、那狗		
2005	Pretty Swindler 捞女日志		
2005	The Money Tree 摇钱树		
2005	He Who Chases After the Wind 捕风汉子		
2005	Gimme Kudos 求求你，表扬我	Ouyang Hua	
2006	Kissed by the Wolves 吻狼		
2007	Twins Mission 双子神偷	TV host	
2009	The Founding of a Republic 建国大业	Fu Dongju	
2009	The Magic Aster 马兰花		
2009	Tiny Dust, True Love 寻找微尘		

=== Television ===
Year	Title	Role	Notes
2000	Lü Buwei: Hero in Times of Disorder 乱世英雄吕不韦	Yunjiang	
2001	Xiucai Doufu 秀才豆腐	Yang Jingjing	
2002	Li Wei the Magistrate 李卫当官	Yue Siying	
2003	Zhaimen Nizi 宅门逆子	Zhang Suxin	
2003	Pink Ladies 粉红女郎	Wanrenmi	Golden Eagle Award for Best Performing Art by an Actress
2003	The Story of Selecting Imperial Concubines 选妃记	Hehua / Yangliu	
2003	Demi-Gods and Semi-Devils 天龙八部	A'zi	
2004	The Luckiest Man 吉祥如意	Wan Ruyi	also known as Tianxia Wushuang (天下无双)
2004	Shuangxiang Pao 双响炮	Lü Xia	
2004	Wo De Wulin Nanyou 我的武林男友	Cary	
2005	Wo Ai Hedong Shi 我爱河东狮	Du Yuehong	
2006	Shei Wei Ni Zuozheng 谁为你作证	Chen Wei	
2006	Meinü Ye Chou Jia 美女也愁嫁	Shen Tian	
2006	Yuwang Zuji 欲望阻击	Xiaoxiao	
2006	The Great Dunhuang 大敦煌	Princess Meiduo	
2007	Huangshang Er Daye 皇上二大爷	Consort Zheng	
2007	Da Huaishu 大槐树	Feng Yuan	
2008	Wanton and Luxurious Living 纸醉金迷	Tian Peizhi	
2010	Three Kingdoms 三国	Diaochan	
2013	Editorial Department Story 新编辑部故事	Anne	
2015	My Dad 待嫁老爸	Wen Ya	
2021	Medal of the Republic 功勋	Li Shiying	
