= 8424 watermelon =

Type of watermelon

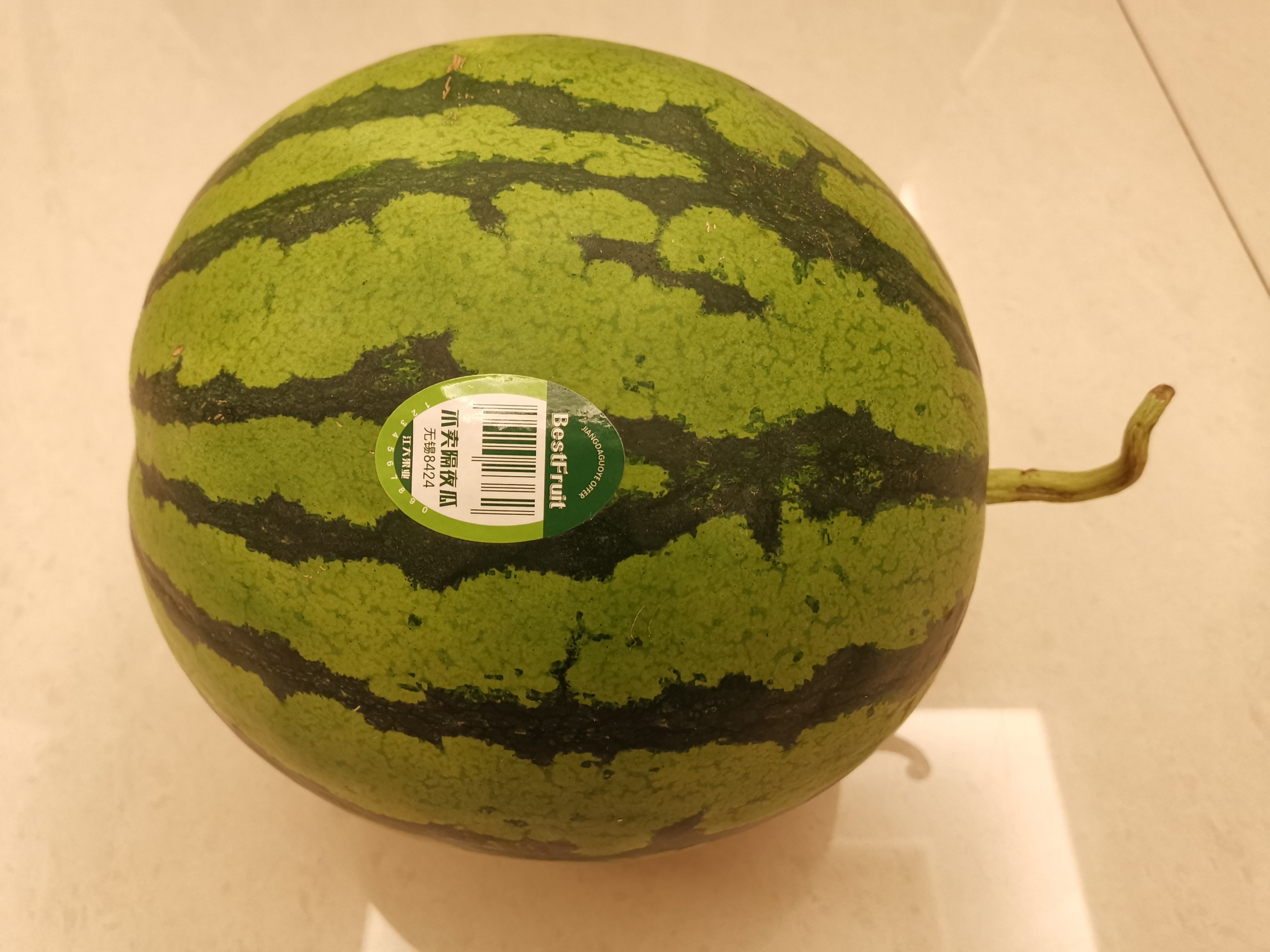
A ripe 8424 watermelon.

The 8424 watermelon, also known as the Zaojia watermelon, (Note: Chinese: 早佳西瓜; pinyin: Zǎojiā Xīgūa) is a herbaceous plant in the Cucurbitaceae family.

== Description ==
A 8424 stem typically grows for 70 to 76 days, and the fruit itself ripens after 30 days. Its skin is 1 centimetre (0.39 in) thick and the fruit weighs 3 kilograms (6.6 lb) on average. Seeds are typically planted in late December, and the fruit is picked in early May. Due to the conditions, the fruit is commonly cultivated inside greenhouses.

== History ==
The fruit was first bred in 1984 by Wu Mingzhu. It was the 24th batch of that year, giving it its name. Shanghai's Nanhui and Qingpu districts began mass-planting the fruit in 1988.

8424 won multiple national awards. Prior to 2020, the fruit remained a local product to the Yangtze Delta. In recent years, the fruit has spread across the country, such as in Zhejiang, Anhui, Hubei, and Xinjiang. Over three hundred thousand 8424s were sold online in 2020 alone, and sales continue to rise as production expands.
