= Kangxi Dynasty =

- DVD cover art
- 康熙王朝
- Genre: Historical drama
- Based on: The Great Kangxi Emperor by Eryue He
- Screenplay by: Zhu Sujin; Hu Jianxin
- Directed by: Chen Jialin; Liu Dayin; Chen Weiguo; Liu Jiankui; Li Ming
- Presented by: Cai Yongrui; Liu Dayin
- Starring: Chen Daoming; Siqin Gaowa; Xue Zhongrui; Gao Lancun; Ru Ping; Li Jianqun
- Theme music composer: Fu Ke
- Opening theme: "Borrow Another 500 Years from Heaven" (向天再借五百年) by Han Lei
- Ending theme: "Great Man" (大男人) by Tengge'er
- Composer: Chen Shouqian
- Country of origin: China
- Original language: Mandarin
- No. of episodes: 50

Production
- Executive producers: Ye Zhikang; Chen Hai; Zhao Xuemei; Li Jinjun
- Producers: Liu Dayin; Liu Yingang; Ying Lijuan
- Production location: China
- Cinematography: Su Li
- Editor: Jiao Chunling
- Running time: ≈45 minutes per episode
- Production companies: China International Television Corporation; Shanghai Qiusuo Film & TV Production; Shanghai Huanghe Film & TV

Original release
- Network: CCTV

Related
- Yongzheng Dynasty; Qianlong Dynasty

Kangxi Dynasty (康熙王朝) is a 2001 Chinese historical drama television series based on the novel The Great Kangxi Emperor (康熙大帝) by Eryue He, focusing on major events during the reign of the Kangxi Emperor of the Qing dynasty. The series is a prequel to the 1997 television series Yongzheng Dynasty, and was followed by Qianlong Dynasty in 2002.

== Synopsis ==
The series focuses on the major events which occurred during the reign of the Kangxi Emperor of the Qing dynasty, including the power struggle with Oboi, the Revolt of the Three Feudatories, and the campaign against the Kingdom of Tungning.

== Cast ==
- Chen Daoming as the Kangxi Emperor
  - Li Nan as the Kangxi Emperor (teenager)
  - Chen Weizhen as the Kangxi Emperor (child)
- Siqin Gaowa as Empress Dowager Xiaozhuang
- Gao Lancun as Mingzhu
- Xue Zhongrui as Songgotu
- Li Jianqun as Consort Rong
- Ru Ping as Sumalagu
  - Hu Shanshan as Sumalagu (young)
- Hu Tiange as Lanqi'er
- Liao Jingsheng as Li Guangdi
- An Yaping as Wei Dongting
  - Liu Ting as Wei Dongting (young)
- Li Hongtao as Galdan Boshugtu Khan
- Liu Dayin as Zheng Jing
- Lu Yong as Yang Qilong
- Cao Yongxiang as Wu Sangui
- Su Tingshi as Yao Qisheng
- Hou Yongsheng as Shi Lang
- Liu Jun as the Shunzhi Emperor
- Yao Chang'an as Oboi
- Zhu Yidan as Sonin
- Gao Tianhao as Yinzhi
- Wan Zhongliang as Yinreng
- Song Laiyun as Ebilun
- Liu Yubin as Zhu Guozhi
- Ma Xiaomao as Wu Yingxiong
- Bo Hong as Consort Donggo
- Zhu Yan as Consort Tunggiya
- Gong Xuehua as Consort Hui
- Tang Ruli as Ziyun
- Zhang Jingjing as Hongyu
- Li Chentao as Empress Hešeri
- Wang Yetian as Baori Longmei
- Zhang Guangzheng as Suksaha
- Li Ruping as Banbu Ershan
- Li Ming as Zhou Peigong
- Gao Liang as Wu Ciyou
- Hao Tienan as Tuhai
- Cui Dai as Wang Fuchen
- Zhao Kai as Wang Jizhen
- Bai Yang as Zhang Tingyu
- Chen Bin as Chen Tingjing
- Xue Yan as Xiaomaozi
- Ma Jie as Huang Jing
- Liu Kui as Wu Liangfu
- Chen Dazhong as Wei Chengmo
- Tong Xiaohu as Li Dequan
- Li Xiaolei as Xingsen
- Zhou Qi as Ji Shi
- Zhao Jingwen as Ge Li
- Guan Dejun as Zheng Tai
- Ren Chao as Feng Xifan
- Zhang Suguo as Liu Guoxuan
- Liu Changsheng as Yulinxiu
- Hao Tienan as Wu Liuyi

== Production ==
The series was partially produced on location at the House of the Huangcheng Chancellor in rural Shanxi, the home of Chen Tingjing, a minister of the Kangxi Emperor who served as the chief editor for his dictionary.

== Awards ==
Kangxi Dynasty won the Outstanding Drama award at the 20th Golden Eagle Television Awards in 2002.

== Reception ==
Although the series was generally popular, it received lower ratings than its predecessor, Yongzheng Dynasty, a similar television series about the Kangxi Emperor's son and successor, the Yongzheng Emperor. The series was criticised by some for being wrought with historical inaccuracies. Critics also pointed out its unnecessary emphasis on Taiwan, a contemporary issue. Some major events during Kangxi's reign were omitted, such as his contributions to the Chinese language with the Kangxi Dictionary, and the contention for the succession among Kangxi's sons, which is featured more prominently in Yongzheng Dynasty.
