= Li Wei (Qing dynasty) =

Li Wei 李衛

Viceroy of Zhili
- In office 29 November 1732 – 3 December 1738
- Preceded by: Liu Yuyi
- Succeeded by: Tang Zhiyu (acting)

Viceroy of Zhejiang
- In office 16 October 1727 – 29 November 1732
- Preceded by: Liu Shiming
- Succeeded by: Cheng Yuanzhang

Governor of Zhejiang
- In office 24 May 1725 – 18 July 1729
- Preceded by: Fumin
- Succeeded by: Cai Shishan

Personal details
- Born: 2 February 1687 Tongshan, Jiangnan (present-day Feng County, Jiangsu)
- Died: 3 December 1738 (aged 51)
- Relations: Li Xingyuan (son)
- Education: Imperial Academy (guozijian)
- Occupation: politician
- courtesy name: Youjie (又玠)
- posthumous name: Minda (敏達)

Li Wei (simplified Chinese: 李卫; traditional Chinese: 李衛; pinyin: Lǐ Wèi; Styled Youjie (又玠), posthumous name Minda (敏達); 2 February 1687 – 3 December 1738) was a Qing dynasty mandarin who lived during the reign of the Yongzheng Emperor (1722–1735). He served the Yongzheng emperor, helped implement his reforms, and held various regional governing positions.

During Yongzheng's reign, Li Wei helped crush the Ming dynasty loyalists. Li also implemented a tax reform that was unpopular with the landowners.

== Biography ==
Li was a native of Tongshan, Jiangnan (present-day Feng County, Jiangsu), and was orphaned at the age of 10. He was not literate, but practiced martial arts. He entered the Board of Finance as a regular accountant in 1719, then headed a department on the board. He then joined the staff of Prince Yong (the later Yongzheng Emperor). After Yongzheng ascended the throne, Li Wei was named the Governor of Zhejiang in 1727, where he carried out one of Yongzheng's signature policies of taxation reform: transitioning from an individual "head tax" to a land tax. The reform was unpopular with local landowners because it increased their share of taxation owed to the state compared to those owed by landless peasants.

In 1729, in a swift act, Li Wei helped crush Ming Dynasty-loyalists present in the Nanjing area. In 1732, he was appointed the Viceroy of Zhili, overseeing the area immediately outside of Beijing (somewhat analogous to present-day Hebei). Li was a contemporary of Tian Wenjing and Ortai, who were Yongzheng Emperor's most trusted officials.

In September 1738, while visiting Qinling tombs with the Qianlong Emperor, Li Wei fell ill with a lung infection, and died at the age of 52. The Qianlong Emperor commemorated Li's death.

Li had five sons, all of whom served in the imperial service.
