= Hai Rui =

Chinese politician (1514–1587)

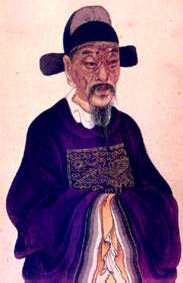
- Born: January 23, 1514; Haikou City, Ming China
- Died: November 13, 1587 (aged 73); Nanjing, Ming China
- Resting place: Haikou City
- Occupations: Philosopher, politician

Chinese name
- Chinese: 海瑞
Transcriptions
Standard Mandarin
- Hanyu Pinyin: Hǎi Ruì
- Wade–Giles: Hai^{3} Jui^{4}
Yue: Cantonese
- Jyutping: Hoi2 Seoi6
Southern Min
- Hokkien POJ: Hái Sūi

Courtesy name
- Traditional Chinese: 汝賢
Transcriptions
Standard Mandarin
- Hanyu Pinyin: Rǔ Xián
- Wade–Giles: Ru^{3} Xian^{2}
Yue: Cantonese
- Jyutping: Jyu5 Jin4

Art name
- Traditional Chinese: 剛峰
Transcriptions
Standard Mandarin
- Hanyu Pinyin: Gāng Fēng
- Wade–Giles: Gang^{1} Feng^{1}
Yue: Cantonese
- Jyutping: Gong1 Fung1

Hai Rui (January 23, 1514 – November 13, 1587), courtesy name Ru Xian (汝賢), art name Gang Feng (剛峰), was a Chinese philosopher and politician of the Ming dynasty, remembered as a model of honesty and integrity in office.

== Biography ==
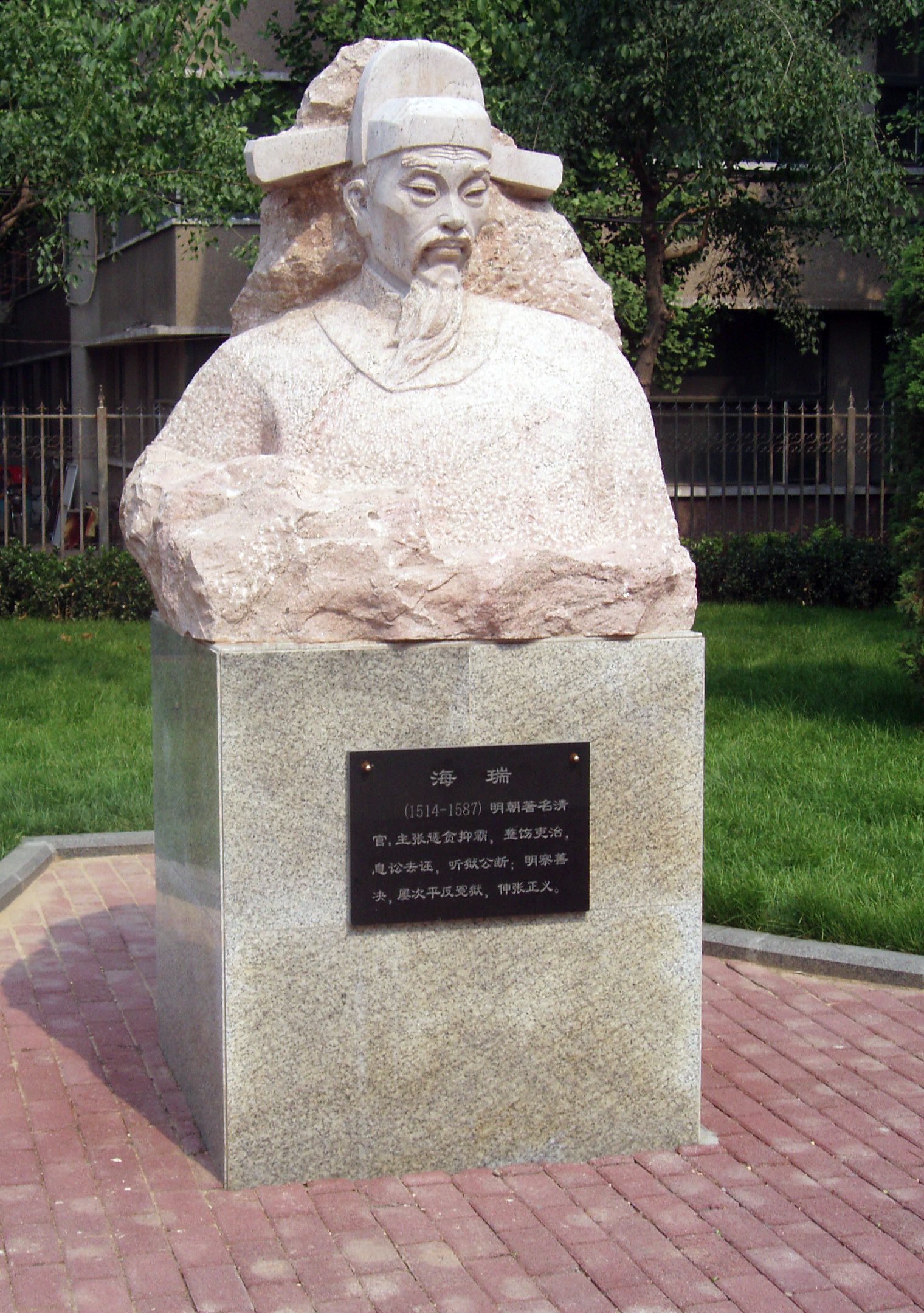
Statue of Hai Rui

Hai Rui, was born in Haikou, Hainan on January 23, 1513. His father died when he was three, and he was raised by his Muslim mother. His great-great-grandfather was an Arab named Hai Da-er (Chinese: 海答兒, Haidar, an Arabic name), and his mother was from a Muslim (Hui) family with ancestry that originated from the Indian subcontinent. Hai himself however was noted primarily as a Neo-Confucianist and never discussed Islam in his Confucian works.

Hai took the Imperial examination but was unsuccessful, and his official career only began in 1553, when he was 39, with a humble position as clerk of education in Fujian. He gained a reputation for his uncompromising adherence to upright morality, scrupulous honesty, poverty, and fairness. This won him widespread popular support, evidenced among other things by his being enshrined while alive; but he also made many enemies in the bureaucracy. Nevertheless, he was called to the capital Beijing and promoted to the junior position of secretary of ministry of Revenue. In 1565, he submitted a memorial strongly criticizing the Jiajing Emperor for the neglect of his duties and bringing disaster to the country, for which he was sentenced to death in 1566. He was released after the Emperor died in early 1567.

Hai was reappointed as a minor official serving at South Zhili under the Longqing Emperor, son and heir of Jiajing Emperor, but was soon forced to resign in 1570 after complaints were made over his overzealous handling of land-tenure issues. Major moneylenders in the prefecture were accused of lending at exorbitant rates to smaller landowners and tenants, then seizing their lands as collateral. Hai devoted considerable time to investigate these cases, pressing for the lands' return to their previous owners, but was in turn accused by officials of violating procedures and encouraging frivolous complaints and impeached by Tai Feng-Hsiang, a supervising secretary (御史, yushi).

Hai Rui was promoted to censor-in-chief of Nanjing in 1586, but died in office a year later. He was given the posthumous name Zhong Jie (忠介).

== Legacy ==
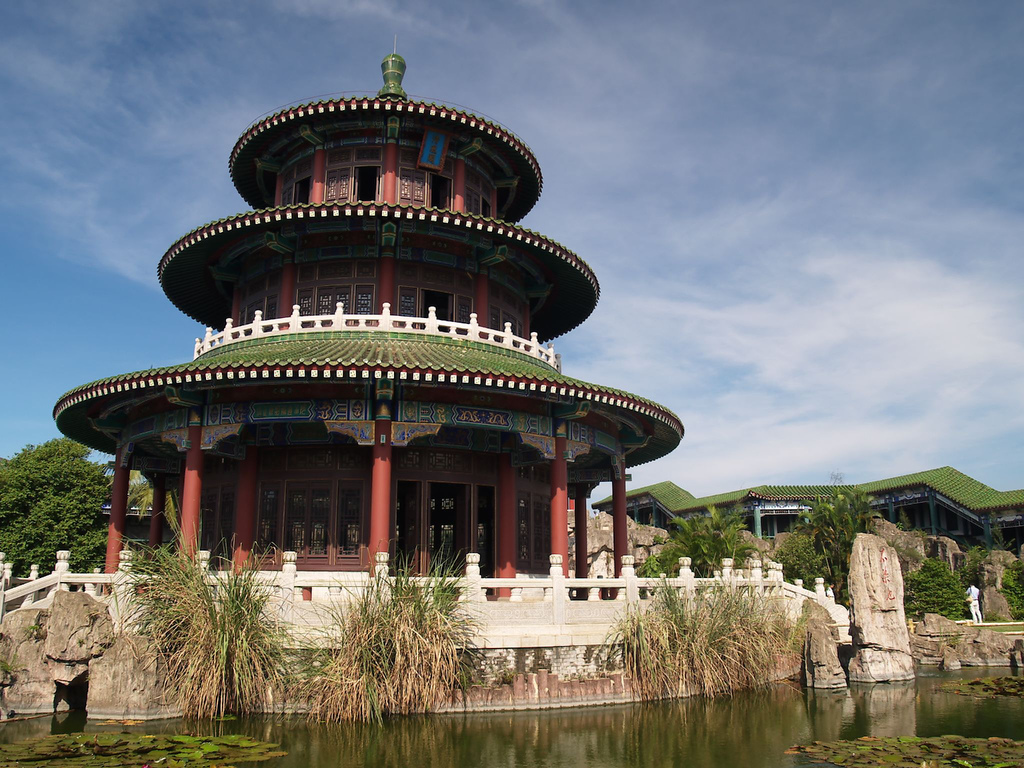
Tomb of Hai Rui at the Temple of Heaven.

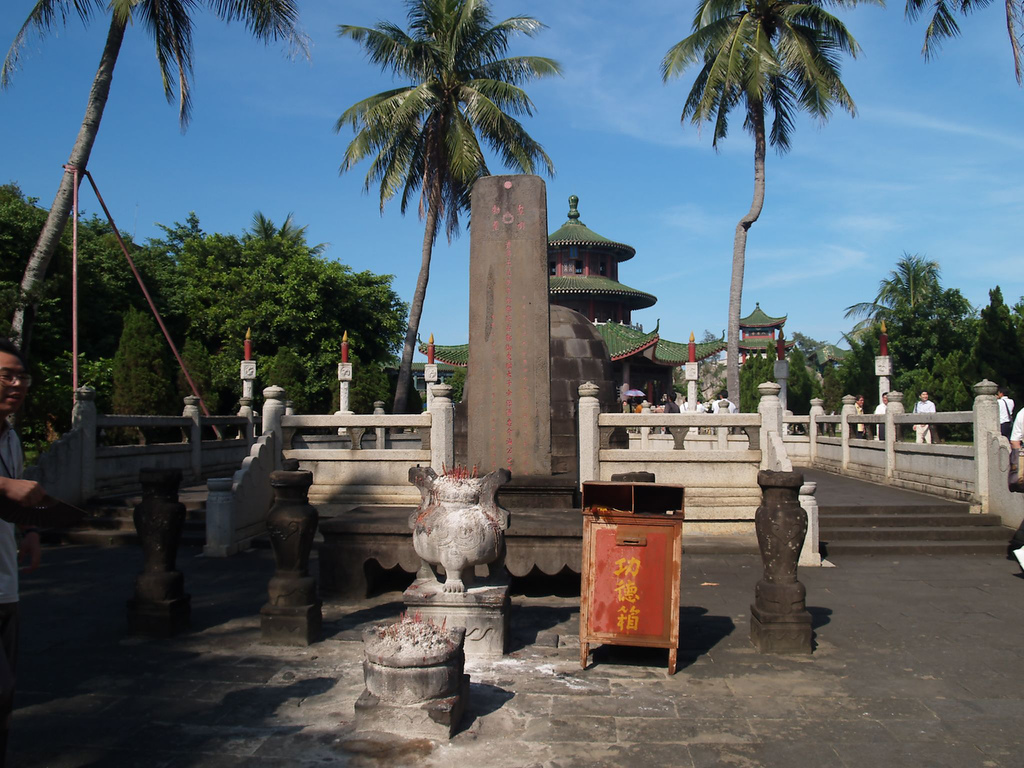
Hai Rui memorial in Haikou

In 1959, writer and scholar Wu Han became interested in the life of Hai Rui, and wrote several articles on his life and his fearless criticism of the emperor. He then wrote a play for Peking Opera titled "Hai Rui Dismissed from Office", which he revised several times before the final version of 1961. Wu's play was interpreted by the Gang of Four member Yao Wenyuan as an allegorical work, in which the honest, moral official Hai Rui represented the disgraced Chinese communist marshal Peng Dehuai, who was purged by Mao after criticizing him as corrupt. According to Yao, the corrupt emperor in Wu's play represented Mao Zedong. The November 10, 1965, article in a prominent Shanghai newspaper, "A Criticism of the Historical Drama 'Hai Rui Dismissed From Office'" (评新编历史剧《海瑞罢官》), written by Yao, began a propaganda campaign that eventually led to the Cultural Revolution. During the Cultural Revolution, the tomb of Hai Rui was destroyed by red guards. Yao's campaign led to the persecution and death of Wu Han, as well as others involved in related works, such as Zhou Xinfang for his opera Hai Rui Submits His Memorial (海瑞上疏).

While Wu Han considers Hai Rui to be a moral socialist, this was not necessarily the case. As historian Ray Huang puts it, "Though one might expect the moral interpretation of history to be generally discredited by now, this is not the case. Some modern historians tend to view the Confucian morality in of certain individuals in terms of the own sense of social justice. Wu Han, for instance, praises his hero Hai Jui for 'standing on the side of peasantry' in their conflict with the landlords. He also asserts that Hai, 'despite a hundred setbacks, still continued the struggle to build a socialist society."

Haikou, the largest city on Hai Rui's home island of Hainan, celebrates Hai Rui's deeds. A memorial has been constructed and his tomb is open for worship.
