= Wu Mingzhu =

Chinese agronomist

- 吴明珠
- Born: January 3, 1930 (age 96); Caidian District, Wuhan, Hubei, China
- Education: Southwest University
- Spouse: Yang Qiyou
- Children: 1
- Scientific career
- Fields: Agronomy
- Workplaces: Institute of Horticultural Crops, Xinjiang Academy of Agricultural Sciences

Chinese name
- Simplified Chinese: 吴明珠
- Traditional Chinese: 吳明珠
Transcriptions
Standard Mandarin
- Hanyu Pinyin: Wú Míngzhū

Wu Mingzhu (born 3 January 1930) is a Chinese agronomist who is a researcher at the Institute of Horticultural Crops, Xinjiang Academy of Agricultural Sciences. She is an academician of the Chinese Academy of Engineering. She is a member of the Chinese Society for Horticultural Science. She was a delegate to the 13th, 16th and 17th National Congress of the Chinese Communist Party.

== Biography ==
Wu Mingzhu was born in Wuhan on January 30, 1930. She studied in the Department of Horticulture, at Southwest University from September 1949 to August 1953, and was a classmate of Yuan Longping.

In May 1953, Wu Mingzhu became a member of the Chinese Communist Party (CCP) and after graduating in August of that year, she worked for the Southwest Agricultural Bureau in Chongqing as a technician. After working for one year, she went to work as an officer in the Southwest Division of the Rural Work Department of the Central Committee of the Chinese Communist Party in Beijing.

From December 1955 to August 1956, she was transferred to the Rural Work Department of the CCP Urumqi Municipal Committee. From August 1956 to 1961, Wu Mingzhu served as deputy director and director of the Shanshan County Agricultural Technology Station and vice principal of the Turpan Agricultural School, and from 1962 to July 1975, Wu Mingzhu served as deputy director and director of the Turpan County Agricultural Technology Station.

From July 1975 to November 1978, Wu Mingzhu was promoted to the position of Deputy Director and Director of the Xinjiang Turpan Regional Science Committee. From November 1978 to April 1985, Wu Mingzhu served as a member of the Xinjiang Tulufan Administrative Bureau and the Tulufan District Committee of the CCP, Deputy Commissioner, and Member of the District Committee.

During the years from January 1985 to January 1992, Wu Mingzhu resigned from her leadership position, choosing to remain a researcher and work at the Institute of Horticultural Crops, Xinjiang Academy of Agricultural Sciences. During the period from November 1989 to March 1990, Wu Mingzhu went to the U.S. Department of Agriculture's Vegetable Laboratory in Charleston, S.C., to work on major melon diseases, multiple disease resistance identification methods, and collaborative breeding research.

In December 1999, Wu Mingzhu was elected as a member of the Chinese Academy of Engineering.

During her research career, Wu Mingzhu has presided over the selection and breeding of 30 varieties of Hami melon and watermelon (including the 8424 watermelon) that have undergone provincial variety approval or recognition. She was one of the first to start collecting and organizing local variety resources of melons in Xinjiang. She saved a number of endangered resources and established a technological innovation system for melon breeding and soilless cultivation. She is the first one in the world to transfer and breed a 100% unisexual flowering rate of crisp flesh type (Hami melon type) high-quality self-breeding line, which has been applied to production. These watermelon and cantaloupe varieties have helped enrich farmers in eastern and southern China. These watermelon and cantaloupe varieties do not sell well only within China but are also exported to markets in Southeast Asia, North America, Europe, and the Middle East, generating hundreds of millions of dollars in economic benefits for Chinese society.

== Personal life ==
Wu married agronomist Yang Qiyou (杨其祐) in Shanshan County in the Spring Festival of 1958. He died of gastric cancer in 1985. They have a son named Yang Xia (杨夏).

== Honours and awards ==
- 1995 State Science and Technology Progress Award for breeding and promotion of new muskmelon series in Xinjiang.
- 1999 Member of the Chinese Academy of Engineering (CAE)
