= Qianlong Dynasty =

- DVD cover art
- 乾隆王朝
- Genre: Historical drama
- Based on: The Qianlong Emperor by Eryue He
- Screenplay by: Chen Yaxian; Shui Yunxian; Yao Yuan
- Directed by: Ma Xiao; Zhao Lei
- Presented by: Long Qiuyun; Liu Wenwu
- Starring: Jiao Huang; Chen Rui; Zuo Xiaoqing
- Theme music composer: Zhang Qianyi
- Opening theme: "Bright Moon" (月朗朗) by Wei Song
- Country of origin: China
- Original language: Mandarin
- No. of episodes: 40

Production
- Executive producers: Huang Jianguo; Wei Wenbin; Tan Xiaoguang; Zeng Fan'an; Wang Guangqun; Ouyang Changlin
- Producers: Peng Yi; Liu Wenwu; Wang Xiaozhu; Li Weiren; Wu Yi; Lan Shaoyin
- Production location: China
- Cinematography: Zhao Lei; Lu Hongyi
- Editors: Yang Xiaoying; Zhao Kun
- Running time: ≈45 minutes per episode
- Production companies: Beijing TV; Shaanxi TV; Nanjing TV; Wuhan TV; Hunan TV & Broadcast Intermediary; Beijing Tongdao Film & TV Production; Shandong TV-Net Media Development

Original release
- Network: CCTV

Related
- Yongzheng Dynasty; Kangxi Dynasty

Qianlong Dynasty (乾隆王朝) is a Chinese historical television series based on the novel The Qianlong Emperor (乾隆皇帝) by Eryue He about the life of the Qianlong Emperor of the Qing dynasty. The series was preceded by Yongzheng Dynasty (1997) and Kangxi Dynasty (2001), both of which were also based on Eryue He's novels.

== Cast ==
- Jiao Huang as the Qianlong Emperor
- Chen Rui as Heshen
- Zuo Xiaoqing as the Tenth Princess
- Yong Mei as Qinglian
- Li Xinmin as Liu Yong
- Qian Xuege as Zhu Gui
- Jia Yiping as Yongyan
- Sha Yi as Fengshen Yinde
- Su Mao as Esente
- Wang Xiaozhu as Pudaozhao
- Jia Zhaoji as Liu Quan
- Wang Hui as Yongxin
- Liang Wei as Yonglian
- Liu Weiming as Ji Xiaolan
- Yang Hongtao as Gao Yuncong
- Xiu Zongdi as Wang Danwang
- Zeng Jing as Chen Huizu
- Zheng Yu as Qian Feng
- Li Yun as Empress Nara
- Lisa Lu as Empress Dowager Chongqing
- Zhou Chuan as Hongzhou
- Yu Liwen as Su Ji
- Dong Ziwu as Hailancha
- Nige Mutu as Zhaohui
- Zhou Zongyin as Huang Kun
- Zhang Xiaopei / Zhang Lanlan as Huang Xing'er
- Anatoly Shanin as George Macartney
