= Yunsi =

Qing dynasty imperial prince

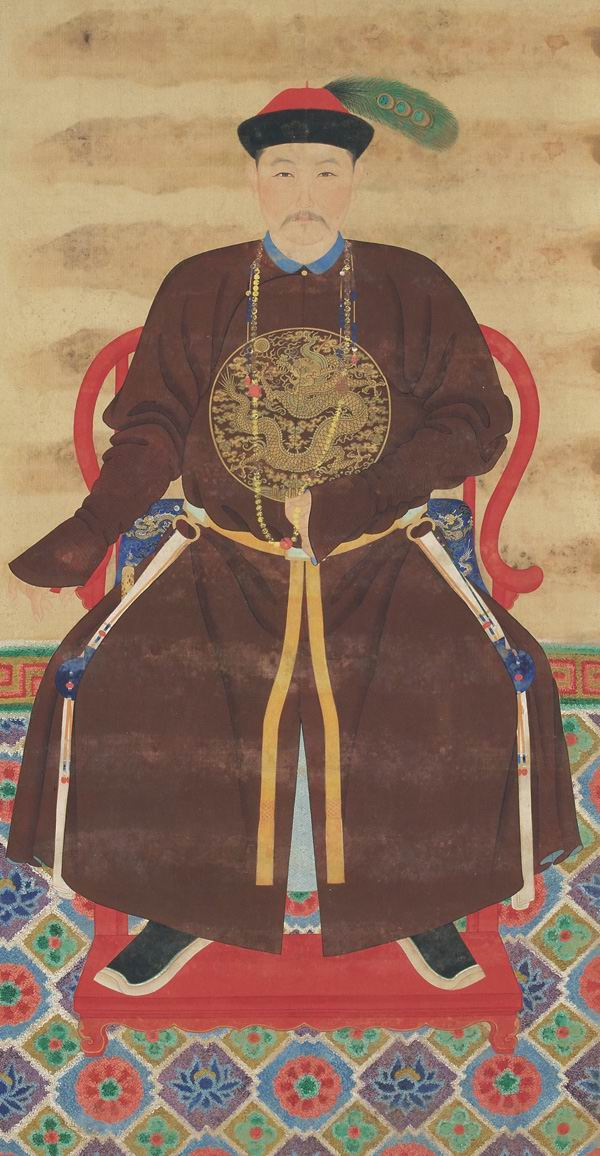
- Portrait of Yunsi

Prince Lian of the First Rank
- Tenure: 17 January 1723 – 12 March 1726
- Successor: Hongwang
- Born: Aisin-Gioro Yinsi (愛新覺羅·胤禩); 29 March 1680
- Died: 5 October 1726 (aged 46)
- Consorts: Lady Gorolo (m. 1698)
- Issue: Hongwang; Princess of the Third Rank
Names
- Aisin-Gioro Yunsi (愛新覺羅·允禩)
- House: Aisin-Gioro
- Father: Kangxi Emperor
- Mother: Consort Liang

Yunsi

Chinese name
- Chinese: 允禩
Transcriptions
Standard Mandarin
- Hanyu Pinyin: Yǔnsì

Yinsi
- Chinese: 胤禩
Transcriptions
Standard Mandarin
- Hanyu Pinyin: Yìnsì

Manchu name
- Manchu script: ᠶᡡᠨ ᠰᡟ

Yunsi (29 March 1680 – 5 October 1726), born Yinsi, was a Manchu prince of the Qing dynasty. The eighth son of the Kangxi Emperor, Yunsi was a popular candidate to succeed his father, but ultimately lost to his fourth brother, Yinzhen. After Yinzhen took the throne as the Yongzheng Emperor, Yunsi was granted the title of Prince Lian, and appointed imperial chancellor and head of the Lifan Yuan, but faced constant suppression and censure from the emperor. In 1726, he was stripped of his titles, expelled from the imperial clan, charged with a litany of offenses, and imprisoned, eventually dying in disgrace. He was posthumously restored to the imperial clan, without titles, during the reign of the Qianlong Emperor.

== Early life ==
Yunsi was born to the Kangxi Emperor and Consort Liang, a Manchu woman of the Plain Yellow Banner, and raised by Consort Hui, the mother of the emperor's first son Yinzhi. Consort Liang was seen by some historians as coming from a disadvantaged background, because she was a member of the sin jeku (Note: Short for sin jeku jetere aha, referred to as the state bondservants. Also transliterated translated as "xinzheku" (辛者庫) in Chinese.) slave caste before she became the Kangxi Emperor's consort. While the low status of his maternal family affected Yinsi's prestige within the ranks of the princes, it also gave Yinsi the impetus to overcome the odds through hard work and cultivating moral character. Over time, Yinsi became one of the Kangxi Emperor's favourite sons. He was popular among the officials in the imperial court, and his uncle Fuquan would often praise him in front of the Kangxi Emperor. At the age of 18, Yinsi was granted the rank of beile, the third highest rank of nobility.

== Succession struggle ==
The Kangxi Emperor had initially chosen Yinreng, his second son, as crown prince. However, towards the later years of the Kangxi Emperor's reign, Yinreng engaged in increasingly licentious activities and also established strong political support for himself, causing him to rapidly lose his father's favour as he was seen as challenging his father's authority. In 1708, during a hunting trip to Rehe, the Kangxi Emperor suspected that Yinreng was conspiring to oust him in a coup, so he stripped Yinreng of his position as crown prince and placed him under house arrest. Four days later, in an apparent sign of trust, the Kangxi Emperor commissioned Yinsi to oversee the imperial household department to "clean the house" and remove some vestiges of Yinreng's influence. However, Yinsi used this unique vantage point as an opportunity to curry favour with those previously loyal to Yinreng. Yinsi, widely known to have a strong base of support among the officials of court due to his moral character and wide range of talents, emerged as a serious contender for crown prince. The breadth of his support was his downfall, as it aroused suspicion from the Kangxi Emperor that Yinsi was competing for influence not against the other princes but against the emperor himself.

Yinsi's support network, which included many top-ranking officials, the Ninth Prince Yintang, Tenth Prince Yin'e, and the 14th Prince Yinti, became a formidable clique in the imperial court, bound together by their desire to see Yinsi become the next emperor. Collectively, this group became known as the Baye Dang, or the Eighth Lord Party (八爺黨). The Baye Dang often saw itself at odds with the Crown Prince Party (太子黨), a similarly influential group bound by their interest of maintaining the position of the crown prince. Once Yinreng was removed as heir apparent, some supporters of Yinsi engaged in conspiracies to murder Yinreng.

Shortly after Yinreng was deposed as crown prince, the Kangxi Emperor's first son Yinzhi had run afoul of the emperor for allegedly getting Tibetan lamas to cast spells on Yinreng. Yinzhi, seeing his own hope of becoming the crown prince evaporate, gave his backing to Yinsi, who had been raised by Yinzhi's mother. At the behest of Yinzhi, a fortune teller called Zhang Mingde was sent to Yinsi, foretelling that Yinsi was predestined for greatness. Yinzhi, long preoccupied with supernatural ways to influence temporal affairs, relayed Zhang's seemingly auspicious predictions about Yinsi's future to the Kangxi Emperor in an attempt to bolster Yinsi's case for becoming crown prince. In response, the emperor, rather than rewarding Yinsi, sentenced Zhang to death by lingchi in order to discourage others from becoming involved in the struggle for succession. The Zhang Mingde episode was a huge blow to Yinsi politically and resulted in his own house arrest.

The Kangxi Emperor, disillusioned by the ambitions of his remaining sons and the ferocity with which they were plotting against one another, reinstated Yinreng as crown prince in 1709. However, the latter was once again deposed in 1711. After Yinreng's second removal from the position of crown prince, the Kangxi Emperor became determined to select another prince as his successor. He issued an order for his court officials to divulge their own preferences on which of his sons should be the next crown prince. In what became essentially a straw-poll vote, the majority of court officials petitioned to the Kangxi Emperor that Yinsi should assume the position of crown prince. The breadth of support for Yinsi had ostensibly caught the Kangxi Emperor off guard. The emperor, in a stark about-turn, declared the results of the vote tally invalid. The emperor became incensed at Yinsi's self-promotion in the struggles that ensued, and stripped him of his beile title and stipend (later restored). Many other princes also became disgraced in the lengthy battle for succession. According to some historians, the Kangxi Emperor had sensed that Yinsi had amassed greater clout than himself, ultimately pushing him to suppress any further ambition by Yinsi for the throne. Thereafter, Yinsi threw his weight behind the 14th Prince Yinti, who was seen by most observers as being destined for the throne.

== Yongzheng reign ==
After his fourth brother Yinzhen succeeded their father as the Yongzheng Emperor in 1722, Yinsi changed his name to "Yunsi" to avoid the same character as the Yongzheng Emperor's personal name as it was considered taboo.

A few weeks after the death of the Kangxi Emperor, the Yongzheng Emperor created Yunsi "Prince Lian of the First Rank" (和碩廉親王; hošoi hanja cin wang), placing Yunsi on the emperor's top advisory board along with Yunxiang, Maci, and Longkodo. Yunsi was charged with heading the Lifan Yuan, which managed the affairs of suzerain regions like Tibet and Mongolia, alongside various foreign relations. Despite bestowing Yunsi with the high honors, the Yongzheng Emperor targeted officials who were Yunsi's political allies. The Yongzheng Emperor frequently criticised Yunsi for not performing his duties properly. In 1724, for example, the emperor ordered Yunsi to kneel in the inner reaches of the Forbidden City for an entire night, ostensibly for an infraction committed during his oversight of the Lifan Yuan. In early 1725, the emperor forcibly exiled Yunsi's wife to the interior, and forbid all communication between the two. In 1726, targeted by trumped-up charges and accusations, Yunsi was stripped of his peerage and banished from the imperial clan.

After his banishment, Yunsi was forced to rename himself "Akina" (Manchu: ᠠᡴᡳᠨᠠ; 阿其那 (Āqínà)). His only son, Hongwang, was also forced to rename himself "Pusaboo," before the 18-year-old was banished to Rehe for military servitude as a common soldier.

Yunsi died in captivity, four years after his brother's coronation.

Hongwang was rehabilitated by the Qianlong Emperor, who had succeeded the Yongzheng Emperor in 1735. In 1778, Yunsi was posthumously restored to the imperial clan and had his name changed back from "Akina" to "Yunsi". However Yunsi was neither rehabilitated nor had his title restored.

=== Meaning of "Akina" ===
"Āqínà" (阿其那) is a Chinese transliteration of a Manchu term. Some scholars have speculated that the original Manchu term is "Acina" (ᠠᠴᡳᠨᠠ), which means "to carry (with your crime)". But according to Hetu Dangse, a thematic archive of historical documents from the Qing Dynasty now preserved in the Archives of Liaoning Province, the original term is "Akina" (ᠠᡴᡳᠨᠠ). Though undoubtedly pejorative, the exact meaning of the word is under dispute. It was traditionally understood as "dog", an interpretation that has been widely doubted since the early 20th century. It is now usually interpreted as "frozen fish", "fish or meat on the chopping block", or alternatively, a beast of burden carrying its crimes and driven away like a dog.

== Location of residence ==
According to the Jingshi Fangxiang Zhigao (京師坊巷志稿), the Prince Lian residence was located near Taijichang Road southeast of the Forbidden City, due west of the family compound of Fuquan, Prince Yu. Its interior structure was altered shortly after Yunsi's expulsion from the imperial clan in 1725, and converted to a storehouse during the reign of the Qianlong Emperor. Nevertheless, some parts of the original structure may have survived to the present day. Its approximate location is near the present-day Wangfujing Station of the Beijing Subway, near the Ministry of Commerce of the People's Republic of China.

== Family ==
Primary Consort

- Primary consort, of the Gorolo clan (嫡福晉 郭絡羅氏; d. 1726)

Concubine

- Mistress, of the Zhang clan (張氏)
  - Hongwang (弘旺; 27 January 1708 – 16 December 1762), first son
- Mistress, of the Mao clan (毛氏)
  - Princess of the Third Rank (郡主; 24 June 1708 – 11 January 1776), first daughter
    - Married Sun Wufu (孫五福) in July/August 1724

== In fiction and popular culture ==
- Portrayed by Eric Wan in The Rise and Fall of Qing Dynasty (1988)
- Portrayed by Mark Cheng in Legend of YungChing (1997)
- Portrayed by Wang Huichun in Yongzheng Dynasty (1999), Li Wei the Magistrate (2001) and Li Wei the Magistrate II (2004)
- Portrayed by Savio Tsang in The King of Yesterday and Tomorrow (2003)
- Portrayed by Huang Leixin in Huang Taizi Mishi (2004)
- Portrayed by Liu Dekai in The Book and the Sword (2008)
- Portrayed by Feng Shaofeng in Palace (2011) and Palace II (2012)
- Portrayed by Kevin Cheng in Scarlet Heart (2011)
- Portrayed by Louis Cheung in Gilded Chopsticks (2014)
- Portrayed by He Zhi Long in Dreaming Back to the Qing Dynasty (2019)

== See also ==
- Royal and noble ranks of the Qing dynasty
- Ranks of imperial consorts in China#Qing
