= Chen Daoming =

Chinese actor

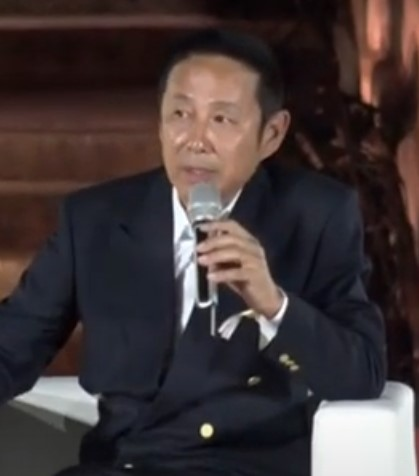
- Chen in 2019
- Born: 26 April 1955 (age 71); Tianjin, China
- Occupation: Actor
- Years active: 1980s-present
- Spouse: Du Xian (m. 1982)
- Children: Chen Ge (b. 1985)

Chinese name
- Traditional Chinese: 陳道明
- Simplified Chinese: 陈道明
Transcriptions
Standard Mandarin
- Hanyu Pinyin: Chén Dàomíng
Yue: Cantonese
- Jyutping: chan4 dou6 ming4

Chen Daoming (born 26 April 1955) is a Chinese actor. He has served as president of China Film Association since 2018.

== Career ==
Chen graduated from the Central Academy of Drama in 1982. He gained attention for his role as Puyi in the 1984 television series The Last Dynasty. In 1990, he starred in CCTV's Fortress Besieged, adapted from Qian Zhongshu's novel of the same name, establishing himself as one of the most critically acclaimed actors in China. In 2000, he was awarded Best Actor at the Huabiao Awards and the Golden Rooster Awards for his role in Huang Jianzhong's historical drama My 1919, which was about the signing of the Treaty of Versailles.

Chen is perhaps known internationally for playing the King of Qin (who later became Qin Shi Huang) in the 2002 film Hero, directed by Zhang Yimou; as well as the undercover police detective in Infernal Affairs III. In 2014, Chen starred in Zhang Yimou's film Coming Home alongside Gong Li.

== Personal life ==
In 1982, Chen married Du Xian, a news anchor of China Central Television who would be forced to resign for showing sympathy for the Tiananmen Square protests of 1989. Their daughter, Chen Ge, was born in 1985. Chen's son-in-law, Wang Liwei, is manager of Xiao Zhan.

== Filmography ==
=== Film ===
Year	English title	Chinese title	Role	Ref.
1982	Flying Snowstorm	今夜有暴风雪	Cao Tieqiang	
1983	One and Eight	一个和八个	Xu Zhi	
1985	Snuff Bottle	烟壶	Wu Shibao	
1986	Massacre in Nanjing	屠城血证	Li Yuanxiao	
1987	Evil Empress	一代妖后	Tongzhi Emperor	
1990	Justice Guan	关公	Zhou Yu	
1995	Dance Fever	舞潮	Ding Mocun	
1995	Peach Blossom	桃花满天红	Mantianhong	
1999	My 1919	我的1919	V.K. Wellington Koo	
2002	Hero	英雄	King of Qin	
2003	Infernal Affairs III	无间道III	Shen Cheng	
2005	Rainbow	我心飞翔	Xu	
2009	The Founding of a Republic	建国大业	Yan Jinwen	
2009	The Treasure Hunter	刺陵	Hua Dingbang	
2010	Aftershock	唐山大地震	Wang Deqing	
2011	The Founding of a Party	建党伟业	V.K. Wellington Koo	
2012	Back to 1942	一九四二	Chiang Kai-shek	
2014	Coming Home	归来	Lu Yanshi	
2018	Air Strike	大轰炸	Chief of City Defense	
2021	My Country, My Parents	我和我的父辈	The elder brother	
2024	Decoded	解密	Xiaolili	

=== Television series ===
Year	English title	Chinese title	Role	Notes/Ref.
1984	The Last Dynasty	末代皇帝	young Puyi	
1989	Yinghua Meng	樱花梦	Cui Mingyi	
1990	Fortress Besieged	围城	Fang Hongjian	
1992	Beiyang Fleet	北洋水师	Itō Sukeyuki	
1994	Qinglou Yuan Meng	青楼鸳梦	Dachahu	
1995	Yi Di Jimao	一地鸡毛	Xiaolin	
1996	A Native of Shanghai in Tokyo	上海人在东京	Zhu Yue	
1996	Hu Xueyan	胡雪岩	Hu Xueyan	
1997	Kou Laoxi'er	寇老西儿	Eight Virtuous Prince	
1998	The Female Official	女巡按	Liu Fei	
1999	Father and Son of the Ma Family	二马	Ma Zeren	
1999	Shaoxing Shiye	绍兴师爷	Fang Jingzhai	
2000	Young Justice Bao	少年包青天	Eight Virtuous Prince	
2001	The Imperial Sword	尚方宝剑	Xianfeng Emperor	
2001	Long March	长征	Chiang Kai-shek	
2001	Kangxi Dynasty	康熙王朝	Kangxi Emperor	
2002	Black Hole	黑洞	Nie Mingyu	
2002	The Prince of Han Dynasty	大汉天子	Dongfang Shuo	
2002	Hun Duan Qinhuai	魂断秦淮	Dorgon	
2004	Winter Solstice	冬至	Chen Yiping	
2004	Chinese Divorce	中国式离婚	Song Jianping	
2005	The Affaire in the Swing Age	江山风雨情	Tianqi Emperor	
2005	Lang Tao Sha	浪淘沙	Lin Xiaomin	
2005	Nowhere to Leave Our Youth	我们无处安放的青春	Zhou Deming	also producer
2005	The Great Revival	卧薪尝胆	King Goujian of Yue	
2005	The River Flows Eastwards	一江春水向东流	Wu Jiaqi	
2006	Sha Jia Bang	沙家浜	Diao Deyi	
2006	Jasmine Flower	茉莉花	Gu Shaotang	
2006	A Love Before Gone with the Wind	北平往事	Pan Yuting	
2007	Mo Fang	魔方		producer
2010	Cell Phone	手机	Fei Mo	
2012	King's War	楚汉传奇	Liu Bang	
2017	The First Half of My Life	我的前半生	Zhuo Jianqing	Special appearance
2019	Joy of Life	庆余年	King of Qing	
2021	My Best Friend's Story	流金岁月	Ye Jinyan	

== Awards and nominations ==
Year	Award	Category	Nominated work	Ref.
1988	9th Flying Apsaras Awards	Outstanding Actor	The Last Dynasty	
1988	7th Golden Eagle Award	Best Actor	The Last Dynasty	
1990	3rd Golden Phoenix Awards	Society Award	Fortress Besieged	
1990	11th Flying Apsaras Awards	Outstanding Actor	Fortress Besieged	
1999	9th Huabiao Awards	Outstanding Actor	My 1919	
1999	20th Golden Rooster Awards	Best Actor	My 1919	
2010	4th Asia Pacific Screen Awards	Best Actor	Aftershock	
2015	15th Golden Phoenix Awards	Society Award	Coming Home	
2020	26th Shanghai Television Festival	Best Supporting Actor	Joy of Life (nominated)	

Cultural offices
Previous: Li Xuejian	Chairman of the China Film Association; 2018	Incumbent
