= Yongzheng Dynasty =

- DVD cover art
- 雍正王朝
- Genre: Historical drama
- Based on: The Great Yongzheng Emperor by Eryue He
- Screenplay by: Liu Heping
- Directed by: Hu Mei
- Presented by: Yang Weiguang; Liu Wenwu; Cui Zengfu
- Starring: Tang Guoqiang; Jiao Huang; Xu Min; Wang Huichun; Wang Hui; Du Yulu; Jiang Guangyu; Du Zhiguo
- Opening theme: "He Who Wins the Hearts of the People Wins the World" (得民心者得天下) by Liu Huan
- Composer: Xu Peidong
- Country of origin: China
- Original language: Mandarin
- No. of episodes: 44

Production
- Executive producers: Zhao Huayong; Zheng Jiaming
- Producers: Liu Wenwu; Feng Ji; Su Bin; Luo Hao
- Production location: China
- Cinematography: Chi Xiaoning; Zhang Yuefu
- Editors: Liu Miaomiao; Wu Zhaolong
- Running time: ≈45 minutes per episode
- Production companies: CCTV; Changsha TV; Beijing Tongdao Culture Development

Original release
- Network: CCTV

Related
- Kangxi Dynasty; Qianlong Dynasty

Yongzheng Dynasty (雍正王朝) is a 1999 Chinese historical television series adapted from Eryue He's novel The Great Yongzheng Emperor (雍正大帝), which is based on the events during the reigns of the Kangxi and Yongzheng Emperors of the Qing dynasty (1644–1911). Starring Tang Guoqiang as the Yongzheng Emperor, the 44-episode series occupied the CCTV-1 prime time slot; after its premiere, there have been many re-runs of the show on television networks in mainland China, Taiwan and Hong Kong. The series was followed by a 2001 prequel, Kangxi Dynasty, and a 2002 sequel, Qianlong Dynasty, both of which are also based on Eryue He's novels.

Yongzheng Dynasty was one of the most watched television series in mainland China in the 1990s and remains one of the "classics" among Chinese historical dramas. It is among the highest rated CCTV-1 prime time historical dramas in history. The series roughly covers Chinese history from 1705, some 15 years prior to the Yongzheng Emperor's accession to the throne, to the emperor's death in 1735. About one third of the content is devoted to the struggle among the Kangxi Emperor's sons for the succession to their father's throne.

Yongzheng Dynasty received critical acclaim. The major themes covered in the series include loyalty and betrayal, fratricide, political corruption, and the centralisation of power.

== Synopsis ==
The series is set in 18th-century China, starting from towards the end of the Kangxi Emperor's reign. A power struggle takes place among the emperor's sons over the succession. Palace intrigue is rife as complex networks of loyalty develop between the princes and their supporters. Eventually, Fourth Prince Yinzhen emerges victorious and takes the throne as the Yongzheng Emperor.

Many people are surprised as to why the Kangxi Emperor chose Yinzhen over his other likely heirs: Second Prince Yinreng, who has been crown prince for almost 40 years; Third Prince Yinzhi, who excels in literary arts; Eighth Prince Yinsi, who has a reputation for being virtuous; 14th Prince Yinti, the warrior-prince favoured by his father.

Yinzhen, nicknamed "Stern Prince", was not seen as a strong candidate by the imperial court to succeed his father. Previously, he had incited victims of natural disasters in Jiangnan to create a disturbance. To help the victims, he had extorted over two million silver taels from rich merchants and provincial officials. In pursuing imperial treasury debts, he had forced a senior official to commit suicide and caused nobles to sell their assets on the streets. He had watched his brothers compete with each other until they were exhausted before he joined the fray. He had collaborated with Nian Gengyao to sabotage Yinreng in a corruption scandal while superficially maintaining good relations with Yinreng. In the ensuing power struggle after Yinreng is deposed, the Kangxi Emperor scolds Yinsi for vying for the throne, and orders Yinxiang to be imprisoned. The Kangxi Emperor then appoints Yinti as border pacification general-in-chief.

As the Kangxi Emperor lies on his deathbed, he summons seven of his sons to his side, including Yinsi and Yinzhen. Prior to their father's death, Yinzhen releases Yinxiang from captivity and sends him to take control of Fengtai Commandery on the outskirts of Beijing. The Kangxi Emperor speaks to Yinzhen in private, telling him he intends to pass on the throne to him, then dies. Longkodo reads the Kangxi Emperor's final edict and declares Yinzhen the new emperor.

The Yongzheng Emperor's rule is seen as authoritarian and vigorous but efficient. Upon taking the throne, he makes Yinsi and Yinxiang his top advisers. His first priority is to pursue debts owed to the state treasury by officials. He metes out harsh punishments to officials found guilty of corruption. He also uses the confiscated assets and properties from corrupt officials to finance disaster relief efforts and his military campaigns in northwest China. He grows distant to some of his most trusted advisers, including Nian Gengyao and Longkodo, who eventually fall out of his favour. The emperor's 13th brother Yinxiang dies while his eighth brother Yinsi and ninth brother Yintang are expelled from the imperial clan and become commoners.

In 1735, the hardworking Yongzheng Emperor dies suddenly from what appears to be over-exhaustion. He is succeeded by his son, Hongli, who takes the throne as the Qianlong Emperor. Before Hongli becomes emperor, the Yongzheng Emperor forces another of his sons, Hongshi, to commit suicide so as to prevent Hongshi from fighting with Hongli for the throne.

== Cast ==
- Tang Guoqiang as Yinzhen, the Yongzheng Emperor
- Jiao Huang as the Kangxi Emperor
- Xu Min as Yinreng
- Wang Huichun as Yinsi
- Wang Hui as Yinxiang
- Du Yulu as Zhang Tingyu
- Jiang Guangyu as Hongshi
- Du Zhiguo as Nian Gengyao
- Zhao Yi as Li Wei
- Cai Hongxiang as Longkodo
- He Shengwei as Tian Wenjing
- Liao Bingyan as Tong Guowei
- Shi Jianlan as Empress Dowager Renshou
- Xu Zuming as Yinti
- Miao Haizhong as Yintang
- Zhang Yanchun as Yinzhi
- Xia Heping as Yinzhi
- Liu Ke as Yin'e
- Hu Ronghua as Tulišen
- Zhuang Li as Empress Xiaojingxian
- Jia Zhigang as Hongli
  - Yang Haofei as Hongli (younger)
- Yuan Shilong as Hongzhou

== Historical accuracy ==
Yinsi-related

- The series over-emphasised Yinsi in a villainous role, ostensibly for dramatic effect. The series showed Yinsi as much more "in control" of the situation than he actually was. Historically, the Yongzheng Emperor scapegoated Yinsi more than the other way around. Furthermore, Yinsi had fallen out of favour with the Yongzheng Emperor by the second year of the emperor's reign (1724), and died in captivity two years later, but in the series he was portrayed to have died shortly before the Yongzheng Emperor.
- Historically, Yinsi did not propose an "Eight Princes Regency", nor did he propose to force the hand of the Yongzheng Emperor through controlling the military in the capital. He also did not liaise with iron-cap princes for the purpose of deposing the Yongzheng Emperor. All the "iron-cap" princes involved in the 'palace coup' episode are fictional, as their names do not appear in historical records.
- The series made repeated references to Yinsi being created a qinwang (first-rank prince) by the Kangxi Emperor, when, in reality, he was only a beile until the Yongzheng Emperor came to the throne. Historically, the Yongzheng Emperor made Yinsi a qinwang on the day after his coronation.

Other princes

- Yintang was sent to the northwest ostensibly to aid military activity on the frontiers shortly after Yinzhen's accession; in the series this move is portrayed as a means to check Nian Gengyao, but in reality the purpose of this trip was to distance Yintang from potential conspiracies with Yinsi.
- Empress Xiaogongren, the mother of the Yongzheng Emperor and Yinti, died in June 1723, due to sudden illness, less than six months after her son became emperor. In the series it appears in the middle of the Yongzheng Emperor's reign.
- Hongshi died at age 23 in 1727, likely due to being forced to commit suicide, though historians do not uniformly agree on the cause of his death. 1727 was the fifth year of the Yongzheng era, meaning that Prince Bao (Hongli) was heir presumptive for most of the Yongzheng era. In the series, Hongshi was shown to have died nearing the end of the Yongzheng era after having plotted to kill Hongli, none of which was backed by any historical evidence.

Officials

- Historically, Li Wei was never Governor of Jiangsu, nor Viceroy of Liangjiang, as he was portrayed in the series. He served Governor of Zhejiang, then Viceroy of Zhili in the later years of the Yongzheng era. However, historically, one of Li Wei's major achievements was the implementation of the replacement of the head tax with a land tax.
- Wu Sidao was on the staff of Tian Wenjing and was never known to have liaised privately with Yinzhen. In the series, Wu Sidao was portrayed as a major mastermind during Yinzhen's struggle for the throne, serving Yinzhen directly.
- While Zhang Tinglu did serve historically as a head administrator of the imperial examinations, he was not executed for conspiring to leak the contents of the exam. In fact, he served with distinction until the early years of the Qianlong era.
- Neither the official historical record, which was likely doctored in the Yongzheng Emperor's favour, nor any unofficial histories, stipulate Zhang Tingyu as being present during the delivery of the will of the late emperor. Apart from this detail, the series mostly stayed true to the official histories of the Qing dynasty. A rough consensus among historians was that the "seven princes receiving the will" version of events was concocted by Yinzhen and his supporters after the silencing of his political rivals. More likely, the only significant figures tending to the Kangxi Emperor in his final days were Longkodo and Yinzhen himself.

Personal

- In the series, the Yongzheng Emperor is shown to have died due to exhaustion from overwork. Most historians agree that the cause of death was more likely his overdosing on what he thought to be an elixir for eternal life. His death also occurred rather suddenly; that is, he was not suffering from any known chronic illness. Historians believe that the emperor had become obsessed searching for such an elixir both before and after his ascension to the throne.
- Qiao Yindi, depicted as a lover of both Yinti and the Yongzheng Emperor, is an entirely fictional character.

== Soundtrack ==
The music for the series was composed by Xu Peidong.

1. "He Who Wins the Hearts of the People Wins the World" (得民心者得天下) by Liu Huan
2. "Cowherd Boy" (牧童) by Xu Peidong
3. "Inner Palace" (深宫)
4. "Emotional Debt" (情债)
5. "Attending Court" (上朝)
6. "Going to War" (出征)
7. "Predestined Romance" (情缘)
8. "Incident" (事件)
9. "Mysterious" (神秘)
10. "Dead Romance" (情殇)
11. "Popular Tradition" (民俗)
12. "Emotional Blame" (情怨)
13. "Action" (行动)
14. "Triumphant Return" (凯旋)
15. "Historical Perspective" (史观)

== Awards and nominations ==
Award	Year	Category	Nominee(s)	Result	Ref.
Golden Eagle Awards	1999	Outstanding Drama	Yongzheng Dynasty	Won	
Golden Eagle Awards	1999	Outstanding Lead Actor	Tang Guoqiang	Won	
Golden Eagle Awards	1999	Outstanding Supporting Actor	Jiao Huang	Won	
Golden Eagle Awards	1999	Outstanding Supporting Actor	Wang Huichun	Won	
Golden Eagle Awards	1999	Best Screenplay	Liu Heping and Luo Qiangqiang	Won	
Golden Eagle Awards	1999	Best Art Direction	Qin Duo	Won	
Golden Eagle Awards	1999	Best Editing	Liu Miaomiao	Won	
Golden Eagle Awards	1999	Best Music	Xu Peidong	Won	
Golden Eagle Awards	1999	Best Theme Song	"He Who Wins the Hearts of the People Wins the World"	Won	
Feitian Awards	1999	Outstanding Historical Television Series	Yongzheng Dynasty	Won	
Feitian Awards	1999	Outstanding Actor	Jiao Huang	Won	
Feitian Awards	1999	Outstanding Writer	Liu Heping and Luo Qiangqiang	Won	
Feitian Awards	1999	Outstanding Art Direction	Qin Duo, Li Daochu, Yang Zhaohui, Zhao Xin, and Zhang Aimin	Won	
Feitian Awards	1999	Outstanding Music	Xu Peidong	Won	
