= Nian Gengyao =

Qing military commander (1679–1726)

Viceroy of Chuan-Shaan
- In office 18 June 1721 – 20 May 1725
- Preceded by: himself as the Viceroy of Sichuan
- Succeeded by: Yue Zhongqi

Viceroy of Sichuan
- In office 3 November 1718 – 18 June 1721
- Preceded by: Ohai (as the Viceroy of Chuan-Shaan)
- Succeeded by: himself as the Viceroy of Chuan-Shaan

Personal details
- Born: 1679
- Died: 13 January 1726 (aged 46–47)

Military service
- Allegiance: Qing dynasty
- Branch/service: Han Chinese Bordered White Banner; Han Chinese Bordered Yellow Banner
- Rank: General

Nian Gengyao

Chinese name
- Traditional Chinese: 年羹堯
- Simplified Chinese: 年羹尧
Transcriptions
Standard Mandarin
- Hanyu Pinyin: Nián Gēngyáo

Courtesy name
- Chinese: 亮功
Transcriptions
Standard Mandarin
- Hanyu Pinyin: Liàng gōng

Art name
- Traditional Chinese: 雙峰
- Simplified Chinese: 双峰
Transcriptions
Standard Mandarin
- Hanyu Pinyin: Shuāng fēng

Manchu name
- Manchu script: ᠨᡳᠶᠠᠨ ᡤᡝᠩ ᠶᠣᡠ
- Romanization: niyan geng yoo

Nian Gengyao (1679 – 13 January 1726), courtesy name Lianggong, was a Chinese military commander of the Qing dynasty. He was born a member of the Han Chinese Bordered Yellow Banner and had extensive military experience on the western frontier of the Qing Empire. Nian became commander-in-chief of the Qing armies in the northwest; and helped to incorporate the region of what is now Qinghai into the Qing Empire.

== Life ==
Nian's father, Nian Xialing (年遐齡), served as Viceroy of Huguang from 1692 to 1704. Nian himself was a jinshi in 1700 and was selected a bachelor of the Hanlin Academy. In March 1709, the Banner company to which the Nian family belonged was assigned to serve the prince Yinzhen, who later became the Yongzheng Emperor. About the same time a sister of Nian Gengyao, Imperial Noble Consort Dunsu, became a concubine of Yinzhen.

In October 1709, Nian was appointed Governor of Sichuan and gradually came to the notice of the Kangxi Emperor. During the 16 years of his administration, he quelled several uprisings of the aborigines west of Sichuan. In 1718, he was made Governor-General of Sichuan and was given power to direct military affairs. Following the appointment of Yinti, another of the Kangxi Emperor's sons, as Border Pacification General-in-chief, there were suggestions about Nian's loyalty to Yinzhen. As General Who Secures the West (定西將軍), Nian Gengyao took an active part in supplying Yinti's campaign in Tibet against Tsewang Rabtan. In June 1721, he was granted an audience with the elderly Kangxi Emperor at Rehe and subsequently raised to the rank of Governor-General of Sichuan and Shaanxi.

In December 1722, the Kangxi Emperor died and Yinzhen ascended the throne as the Yongzheng Emperor. He granted an audience to Nian Gengyao early in 1723 and awarded him a minor hereditary rank and the title of Grand Guardian, and made his elder brother Nian Xiyao (年希堯) Governor of Guangdong. A few months later, as reward for his help in ejecting the Dzungars from Tibet, Nian was elevated to a duke of the third class. The emperor was uncharacteristically informal with him and promoted friendship between Longkodo and Nian.

In 1723, Nian became commander-in-chief of the forces sent to quell the uprising of the Khoshotes of Qinghai under Lobdzan Dandzin. With the help of the general Yue Zhongqi (a descendant of Yue Fei), Nian won several victories over the rebels and in a few months quelled the revolt, adding Qinghai to the Qing Empire. Nian was thereupon raised to a Duke of the First Class. When Nian made a visit to Beijing in late 1724, and paid his respects to the Yongzheng Emperor, he was given additional honours and privileges normally granted to a Prince of the First Rank. His attitude, however, aroused hatred and jealousy, and many officials submitted memorials hostile to Nian.

Nian himself was not slow to discover that he had lost imperial favour, for on his return to Xi'an in January 1725 he submitted a memorial of his own, protesting his loyalty and imploring the Yongzheng Emperor's mercy. Meanwhile; it was discovered that Nian had engaged in secret correspondence with Yintang, the emperor's brother and political rival. His plea for leave being denied, Nian was, at the end of May, transferred to the post of Tartar General at Hangzhou. The armies he once commanded went under the control of Yue Zhongqi. As accusations accumulated from his former friends and officials, Nian was in a few months progressively degraded in rank until he became merely a bannerman-at-large. In November, he was arrested and taken under escort to Beijing. Early in 1726, his crimes were enumerated under 92 heads, and Nian was sentenced to be executed. The Yongzheng Emperor granted him the privilege of committing suicide but his eldest son, Nian Fu (年富), was beheaded and his other sons were banished.

Nian is credited with three works on military tactics: General Nian's Art of War (Chinese: 年將軍兵法) among others, but all were apparently written by others and falsely attributed to him.

He was married to the Imperial Duke Who Assists the State (宗室輔國公) Aisin Gioro Suyan's (蘇燕) daughter and to the Manchu Plain Yellow Bannerman Nalan Xingde's daughter.

== See also ==
- Qing dynasty in Inner Asia

Government offices
Preceded by Ohai	Viceroy of Chuan-Shaan; 1719–1725	Succeeded by Yue Zhongqi
