= Love Yunge from the Desert =

Chinese television series

- Genre: Historical fiction Romance
- Based on: Song in the Clouds by Tong Hua
- Written by: Shen Zhining
- Directed by: Hu Yijuan; Cai Changsheng; Hu Mingkai
- Starring: Angelababy; Du Chun; Lu Yi; Chen Xiao; Yang Rong
- Opening theme: Silk by Li Yuchun
- Ending theme: Green Skirt by Angelababy
- Country of origin: China
- Original language: Mandarin
- No. of episodes: 45

Production
- Executive producer: Yu Zheng
- Production location: Hengdian World Studios
- Production companies: Dongyang Xingrui; Dongyang Huanyu; ETV Media Culture; Yu Zheng Studio

Original release
- Network: Hunan Television
- Release: 13 September – 23 November 2015

Related
- Sound of the Desert

Love Yunge from the Desert
- Traditional Chinese: 大漢情緣之雲中歌
- Simplified Chinese: 大汉情缘之云中歌
Transcriptions
Standard Mandarin
- Hanyu Pinyin: Dàhàn Qíngyuán Zhī Yúnzhōnggē

Love Yunge from the Desert (Chinese: 大汉情缘之云中歌) is a 2015 Chinese television series based on Tong Hua's novel Song in the Clouds. It is a sequel to Sound of the Desert (2014), also based on a novel by Tong Hua. The series was produced by Yu Zheng and stars Angelababy, Du Chun, Lu Yi, Chen Xiao and Yang Rong. It aired on Hunan Television from 13 September to 23 November 2015.

The series was criticized for its poor knowledge of history and poor acting performance.

== Synopsis ==
During the Western Han dynasty, eight-year-old, Liu FuLing, Emperor Zhao of Han meets a young girl, YunGe (daughter of Huo QuBing and Jin Yu from Ballad of the Desert), who rescued him from the dangers and cold of the desert. He tells her his name is Zhao Ling. He hears her sing a song which is the same song his mother used to sing to him and falls in love with her. They make a promise to find each other when they grow up. He gives her his hair rope locket (given by his mother, her last gift to him) and she gives him her embroidered shoe. He has to leave her. As he rides off, he tells her his actual last name is Liu and will be living in Chang'An where he will wait for her there when she grows up.

Nine years later, YunGe is now a beautiful young woman with excellent cooking skills, who cannot forget Brother Ling, the boy she rescued from the desert. Her parents are trying to marry her off to a distinguished man whom her family likes. She doesn't want to marry anyone but Brother Ling & decides to leave home. She ventures out to Chang'An to find him. Brother Ling also has not forgotten her all these years and is now Emperor. He still has the embroidered shoe she had given him when they parted ways and has been waiting for her in Chang'An as promised.

On arriving in Chang'An, she mistakes Liu BuYi (Liu Xun) for Brother Ling (Liu FuLing) when she sees his jade pendant which Liu FuLing also has (both pendants were given to them by their father, the previous Emperor). She is heartbroken, because Liu BuYi (Liu Xun) already has someone he loves, Xu PingJun, and thinks he has forgotten about her. She tries to forget him and let go, but cannot. She becomes best friends with Xu PingJun. She helps Liu BuYi and Xu PingJun get married as she sees how much in love they are. Xu PingJun becomes pregnant with Liu BuYi's child after they are married.

Yun Ge meets a handsome, rich young man, Meng Jue on her arrival in Chang'An. She doesn't remember him. When they were young, Yun Ge and Brother Ling met him in a desert city, Wu Lei City, when they were bought there by the City Master. He told them his name was Qiu Sheng. They all find out the City Master is evil and are successful in escaping the city. After Brother Ling left, YunGe saw Meng Jue, he was injured in a fight and needed a doctor, but he doesn't have any money. Yun Ge gave him her another embroidered shoe which has precious pearls on it, so he would have money to see a doctor to treat his injuries. Meng Jue never forgot Yun Ge and is in love with her. He helps her to get a place to stay, new clothes and a job in a restaurant as a head chef. He is also an ambitious business man seeking power and influence. He knows Liu BuYi is not Brother Ling, but doesn't tell Yun Ge. Letting her believe Brother Ling doesn't remember her. Meng Jue keeps her away from the real Brother Ling, in hopes she will forget Brother Ling and fall in love with him. After Liu BuYi marries Xu PingJun, she tries to forget Brother Ling since she believes he is now married.

Yun Ge, eventually, bumps into Zhao Ling (Liu FuLing) who is looking for the Divine Dr. Mu or his female disciple, BaiHe, to cure his skin rash, but she doesn't know he is her Brother Ling. He tells her his name is Liu ChangFeng. She cures him of his skin rash. Brother Ling suspects she is Yun Ge, but isn't sure since he was led to believe her name is BaiHe. She has heard Brother Ling playing his flute with their song at the home of the Imperial Princess Uyigar, his sister, where she had been asked to cook a banquet, but Meng Jue keeps her from finding out. She later realizes, Liu ChangFeng (Liu FuLing) is actually Brother Ling, the man she has been searching for all along. By then, she had already fallen for Meng Jue.

Brother Ling keeps searching for Yun Ge and has even heard her singing their song in the imperial palace. He has an Empress, but treats her like a sister. He is willing to wait for Yun Ge for the rest of his life, but he doesn't know he has already met her. Although he suspects Bai He is Yun Ge, he has no proof.

Brother Ling finds out the BaiHe he met is actually YunGe from the restaurant owner where she used to work. He is ecstatic and immediately rushes to find her. YunGe realizes Liu ChangFeng is Brother Ling, but is ashamed to face him as she had fallen for Meng Jue who she no longer loves believing he was only using her to get the plaque representing leadership of a well known gang. Through several incidents, the lovers are finally reunited.

Later on, Yun Ge find herself embroiled in the power struggles within the imperial palace between the ministers, imperial princes, Huo Guang, Meng Jue and Liu FuLing.

== Cast ==
=== Main ===
- Angelababy as Huo Yun Ge (雲歌), daughter of General Huo Qubing and Jin Yu (Xin Cheng). She is bright, innocent and free-spirited. She is an excellent cook. She loves Liu FuLing.
  - Jiang YiYi as young Huo Yun Ge
- Du Chun as Meng Jue (孟玨), a highly skilled doctor, businessman, and politician. He loves Yun Ge.
- Lu Yi as Liu Fu Ling (劉弗陵/漢昭帝), the Emperor Zhao of Han. Childhood sweetheart of Yun Ge. He loves YunGe.
- Chen Xiao as Liu Xun (劉詢/劉病已), the Emperor Xuan of Han. He loves & marries Xu PingJun. They have a son, Hu'er, together.
- Yang Rong as Huo ChengJun (霍成君), daughter of Huo Guang. She loves Meng Jue.

=== Supporting ===
- Su Qing as Xu PingJun (許平君), Empress XiaoXuan, wife of Emperor Xun of Han. Gave birth to a son to Emperor Xun before going to the palace.
- Bao Bei'er as Liu He (劉賀), Prince of Chang Yi.
- Mao XiaoTong as Empress ShangGuan (上官皇后), virgin wife of Emperor Zhao of Han.
- Kou Zhenhai as Huo Guang (霍光), a politician/Minister of war & general.
- Leo Liu as Yu An (于安), chief eunuch of Emperor Zhao of Han.
- Zhang Yameng as Huo Xian (霍顯), Huo Guang's wife and Huo ChengJun's mother.
- Zhang Xueying as Mo Cha (抹茶), Yun Ge's handmaiden.
- Tian-Yang Zhang as Fu Yu (富裕), Yun Ge's eunuch.
- Wang Haoran as Hong Yi (紅衣), Prince of Chang Yi's personal handmaiden & assassin.
- Zhang Zhehan as Liu Xu (劉胥), Prince Li of Guang Ling.
- Jiang Xiaochong as Huo Yun (霍雲), Huo Guang's grandson & Huo QuBing's grand nephew.
- Bai Shan as Lady Gou Yi (鉤弋夫人/趙婕妤), also known as Consort Fist or Consort Hook, Emperor Zhao's mother.
- Kan Qingzi as Huo Lian'Er (霍憐兒), Huo Guang's daughter and Huo ChengJun's half sister.
- Wang Huazi as ShangGuan Jie (上官桀), Empress ShangGuan's father, a politician/minister.
- Andy Wu as Ba Ping (八平), a chief eunuch who replaced Qi Xi.
- Dong Hui as Cheng Er (橙兒), Empress ShangGuan's handmaiden.
- Teresa Wang as Hu Er (虎兒), young Emperor Yuan of Han, son of Emperor Xun & Xu PingJun.
- Cheng Lisha as Xin Cheng (心誠), Yun Ge's mother.
- Zhao Liying as Bai He (百合), a female doctor, disciple of Divine Dr. Mu.
- Yoko Wang as Xiao Su (小蘇), Huo ChengJun's handmaiden.
- Young Chen as Qi Xi (七喜), chief eunuch of Emperor Xuan.
- Sun Ao as Yue Sheng (月生), Meng Jue and Liu He's sworn brother, Hong Yi's brother.
- Ivan Zhu as Doctor Chang (張太醫), an imperial physician.
- Fu Yiwei as Meng Jue's mother
- Yang Long as He XiaoQi (何小七)
- Xia Yang as A Zi (阿紫), Empress ShangGuan's handmaiden & Huo Guang's spy.
- Jiang Yiyi as young Huo Yun Ge
- Qiu Muyuan as young Meng Jue
- Fangyao Ziyi as young Liu FuLing
- Su Jue Lan as young Huo Cheng Jun
- Fann Wong as Wu Lei (無淚)
- Hu Bing as Liu Che (劉徹/漢武帝), Emperor Wu of Han, Liu FuLing's father.
- Choenyi Tsering as Princess Aliya (阿利亞公主)

== Production ==
On 18 March 2013, the author of the original novel Tong Hua announced the film rights has been bought by Yu Zheng.

Principal photography started on 3 April 2013 and wrapped in 3 July. The series was shot in Hengdian World Studios, Zhejiang.

On 18 August 2014, the producer released the music video for its theme song, Silk, which was sung by well-known Chinese singer Li Yuchun.

On 11 August 2015, the official trailer was released.

== Soundtrack ==
Name	Singer	Note
Silk (丝萝)	Li Yuchun	Opening theme song
The Sky Outside (云天外)	Chen Xiao and Lu Yi	
Green Skirt (绿罗裙)	Angelababy	Ending theme song
Song of Cai Wei (采薇曲)	Zhang Ludi	
Jian Jia (蒹葭)	Liu Fang	
Cotton in the Clouds (云中锦香)	Yangxin Wenqi	

== Ratings ==
Air date	Episode	Unit name	CSM50 city network ratings			National Internet ratings		
Air date	Episode	Unit name	Ratings (%)	Audience share (%)	Rank	Ratings (%)	Audience share (%)	Rank
September 13, 2015	1-2	Wind and sand	0.889	5.233	1	0.97	8.31	1
September 14, 2015	3-4	Wind and sand	0.947	5.953	1	0.99	8.30	1
September 20, 2015	5-6	Acacia	0.883	4.896	1	0.79	6.36	1
September 21, 2015	7-8	Acacia	0.861	5.403	1	0.80	7.02	1
September 27, 2015	9-10	Play in play	1.032	5.575	1	1.04	7.93	1
September 28, 2015	11-12	Play in play	1.034	6.356	1	1.01	8.38	1
October 4, 2015	13-14	Get away	0.986	5.049	1	1.36	10.05	1
October 5, 2015	15-16	Get away	1.161	6.341	1	1.58	11.49	1
October 11, 2015	17-18	Forget	0.748	4.347	1	0.71	6.24	1
October 12, 2015	19-20	Forget	0.650	4.471	1	0.73	7.25	1
October 18, 2015	21-22	Dream as true	0.676	4.175	1	0.63	5.79	1
October 19, 2015	23-24	Dream as true	0.757	4.807	1	0.73	6.62	1
October 25, 2015	25-26	Emotional change	0.714	4.268	1	0.69	5.86	1
October 26, 2015	27-28	Emotional change	0.633	3.975	1	0.63	5.49	1
November 1, 2015	29-30	Serial robbery	0.628	3.753	1	0.68	6.06	1
November 2, 2015	31-32	Serial robbery	0.689	4.612	1	0.69	6.65	1
November 8, 2015	33-34	Chaotic	0.655	3.747	1	0.82	6.66	1
November 9, 2015	35-36	Chaotic	0.700	4.353	1	0.93	7.99	1
November 15, 2015	37-38	Hate hard to pay	0.746	4.806	1	0.74	8.86	1
November 16, 2015	39-40	Hate hard to pay	0.692	4.617	1	0.86	8.03	1
November 22, 2015	41-42	Where to go	0.651	3.849	1	0.86	6.73	1
November 23, 2015	43-44	Where to go	0.959	5.983	1	1.07	9.05	1
Average ratings			0.806	4.868	1	0.88	7.52	1

- Highest ratings are marked in red, lowest ratings are marked in blue
