= Chen Xiao =

Chinese actor and model (born 1987)

Chen Xiao 陈晓
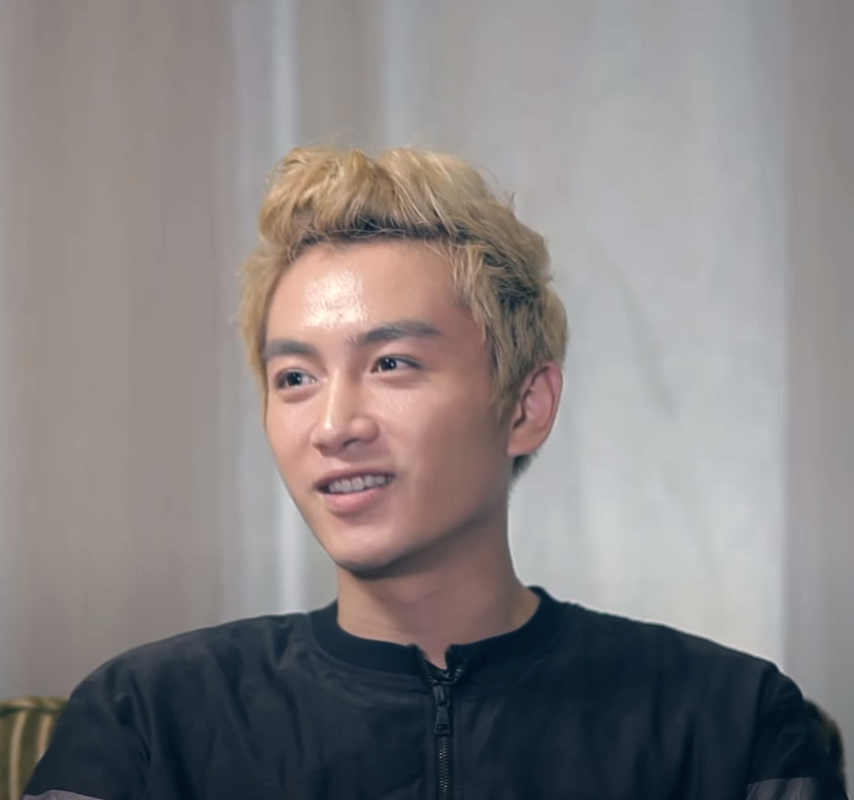
- Chen being interviewed in 2015
- Born: 5 July 1987 (age 39); Hefei, Anhui, China
- Education: Central Academy of Drama (BFA)
- Occupation: Actor
- Years active: 2010–present
- Agent: Chen Xiao studio
- Spouse: Michelle Chen (m. 2016; div. 2025)
- Children: 1

Chinese name
- Traditional Chinese: 陳曉
- Simplified Chinese: 陈晓
Transcriptions
Standard Mandarin
- Hanyu Pinyin: Chén Xiǎo

Chen Xiao (Chinese: 陈晓, born 5 July 1987) is a Chinese actor. He is known for his roles in TV series Swordsman (2013), Legend of Lu Zhen (2013), The Romance of the Condor Heroes (2014), Nothing Gold Can Stay (2017), A Dream of Splendor (2022), and Legend of the Magnate (2025).

Chen ranked 93rd on Forbes China Celebrity 100 list in 2014, and 74th in 2015.

== Early life and education ==
Chen Xiao was born into a family of civil servants in Hefei, Anhui. At the age of 10, he was cast in his first television series Our Class Song (1997). Chen graduated from the Central Academy of Drama in 2009.

== Career ==
=== 2009–2012: Beginnings ===
In 2009, Chen signed with his first agency Huayi Brothers. He then featured in the film Detective Dee and the Mystery of the Phantom Flame, directed by Tsui Hark. The same year, he appeared in the television series Spell of the Fragrance produced by Yu Zheng. Chen continued to appear in several television series under Yu Zheng, but only official signed a contract with him after starring in Beauties of the Emperor. Chen started to gain attention as an actor in the 2012 hit palace drama Palace II where his portrayal of the 19th prince attracted positive audience reviews.

=== 2013–2016: Rising popularity ===
Chen rose to fame with his role of Lin Pingzhi in the 2013 wuxia television series Swordsman, which was adapted from Louis Cha's novel The Smiling, Proud Wanderer. He then played his first leading role in historical drama Legend of Lu Zhen, where he took on the role of a wise and devoted Emperor. The series was both a domestic and overseas hit, and led to increased recognition for Chen.

In 2014, he starred in wuxia romance drama The Romance of the Condor Heroes, playing Yang Guo. Chen's portrayal of the character earned praised by fans of the original novel by Louis Cha, which further raised his popularity. He also featured in wuxia film The Taking of Tiger Mountain directed by Tsui Hark; playing a young and hot-blooded policeman. He was nominated at the Hundred Flowers Award for Best Supporting Actor.

In 2015, Chen co-starred in historical romance drama Love Yunge from the Desert, adapted from the novel Song in the Clouds by Tong Hua. Despite the mixed reviews and criticism for the series, Chen received acclaim for his performance as a clumsy assassin.

In 2016, Chen starred in the coming-of-age web series Who Sleeps My Bro, which gained a large following online and became a cult classic. The same year, he starred in wuxia drama The Three Heroes and Five Gallants, based on the novel of the same name by Shi Yukun; playing Bai Yutang. Chen was nominated for the Best Actor award in the ancient drama category at the Huading Awards.

=== 2017–present: Acclaim ===
In 2017, Chen starred alongside Sun Li in the historical drama Nothing Gold Can Stay, which earned high ratings of 3%. Chen received acclaim for his performance and experienced a resurgence of popularity. In 2019, Chen starred alongside Joe Chen in the historical television series Queen Dugu, playing the role of the Emperor Wen of Sui. The same year, he starred in road-trip suspense drama Love Journey directed and written by Mao Weining. Chen played an undercover cop who appears frivolous but is serious and passionate about his job, and received positive reviews for his performance. He then starred in romance suspense film Lost in Love directed by Huo Jianqi, as well as military drama The King of Land Battle. In 2022, he starred in the hit show A Dream of Splendor, along with Liu Yifei.

In 2025, his historical drama Legend of the Magnate alongside Sun Qian, recorded an overall rating of 3.5% on CCTV-8, and exceeded over 8,500 popularity index points on IQIYI.

== Personal life ==
Chen Xiao married his The Romance of the Condor Heroes co-star Michelle Chen in 2016. Their son was born in the same year. On 18 February 2025, they announced that they had divorced.

== Filmography ==
=== Film ===
Year	English title	Chinese title	Role	Ref.
2010	Detective Dee and the Mystery of the Phantom Flame	狄仁傑之通天帝國	Lu Li	Guest appearance
2013	The Palace	宮鎖沉香	Yinxiang	
2014	The Taking of Tiger Mountain	智取威虎山	Gao Bo	Special appearance
2015	Bride Wars	新娘大作战	Kai Wen	
2016	Who Sleeps My Bro	睡在我上铺的兄弟	Lin Xiangyu	
2017	The Mysterious Family	神秘家族	Shu Shu	
2017	The Founding of an Army	建军大业	Ren Bishi	
2019	Lost in Love	如影随心	Lu Song	
2021	Handsome Man	嗨！美男子		
2021	A'mai Joins the Army	阿麦从军		

=== Television series ===
Year	English title	Chinese title	Role	Network	Ref.
1997	Our Class Song	我们班的歌	Sun Dong		
2010	Happy Mother-in-Law, Pretty Daughter-in-Law	欢喜婆婆俏媳妇	Guo Xiaotian	Shenzhen TV	
2010	Spell of the Fragrance	國色天香	He Kun	Hunan TV	
2011	Confucius	孔子	Song Chao	Shandong TV	
2011	Hidden Intention	被遺棄的秘密	Zhang Daiwei	Hunan TV	Cameo
2012	Palace II	宮鎖珠簾	Yunxi	Hunan TV	
2012	Beauties of the Emperor	王的女人	Luo Feng	Zhejiang TV	
2012	The Bounty Hunter	賞金獵人	Bai Shaoqun	Hunan TV	
2012	The Qin Empire II: Alliance	大秦帝國之縱橫	Mi Yan	CCTV	Cameo
2013	Swordsman	笑傲江湖	Lin Pingzhi	Hunan TV	
2013	Legend of Lu Zhen	陸貞傳奇	Gao Zhan	Hunan TV	
2013	Longmen Express	龍門鏢局	Miao Xingren	Anhui TV	Cameo
2013	East Mountain School	東山學堂	Xiao Yang	CCTV	
2013	Ex	我的极品是前任		Sohu TV	Cameo
2014	Palace 3: The Lost Daughter	宮鎖連城	Saman	Hunan TV	Cameo
2014	The Romance of the Condor Heroes	神鵰俠侶	Yang Guo / Yang Kang	Hunan TV	
2015	Love Yunge from the Desert	大漢情緣之雲中歌	Liu Xun	Hunan TV	
2015	Wonder Lady	极品女士	Shasha's friend	Sohu TV	Cameo
2016	Who Sleeps My Bro	睡在我上铺的兄弟	Lin Xiangyu	LeTV	
2016	The Three Heroes and Five Gallants	五鼠鬧東京	Bai Yutang	Anhui TV	
2017	Love & Life & Lie	遇见爱情的利先生	Li Yaonan	Zhejiang TV	
2017	The Qin Empire III	大秦帝国之崛起	Mi Yan	CCTV	
2017	Above the Clouds	云巅之上	Tang Fei	iQIYI	
2017	Nothing Gold Can Stay	那年花开月正圆	Shen Xingyi	Dragon TV, Jiangsu TV	
2017	Wild Rose	红蔷薇	Xiao Junhao	Jiangsu TV	
2019	Queen Dugu	独孤皇后	Yang Jian	iQIYI, Youku, Tencent	
2019	Love Journey	一场遇见爱情的旅行	Jin Xiaotian	Jiangsu TV, Zhejiang TV	
2019	The King of Land Battle	陆战之王	Zhang Nengliang	Dragon TV, Zhejiang TV	
2020	Healer of Children	了不起的儿科医生	Deng Zi Ang	Beijing TV, Shenzhen TV	
2021	Shuke and Peach Blossom	舒克与桃花	Shu Ke	Mango TV	
2021	Faith Makes Great	理想照耀中国	He Jingping	Hunan TV	
2021	Refinement of Faith	百炼成钢	Qu Qiubai	Hunan TV	
2021	People's Property	突围	Qin Xiaochong	Dragon TV, Zhejiang TV	
2022	Simmer Down	好好说话	Yang Guang	Hunan TV	
2022	A Dream Of Splendor	梦华录	Gu Qianfan	Tencent Video	
2022	Being a Hero	冰雨火	Wu Zhenfeng	Hunan TV	
2023	Thirteen Years of Dust	尘封十三载	Lu Xingzhi	iQIYI	
2023	The Road of Life	人生之路	Gao Jialin	CCTV, iQIYI	
2023	The Ingenious One	云襄传	Yun Xiang	IQIYI	
2023	Incomparable Beauty	无与伦比的美丽	Xu Yao	Jiangsu TV, Dragon TV, Mango TV	
2024	Simple Days	小日子	Zhu Jingcao	Dragon TV, Zhejiang TV, Tencent	
2024	Mr. Dilicious, Miss Match	火柴小姐的美味先生	Mo Yu	ZTV	Filmed in 2016
2025	Legend of the Magnate	大生意人	Gu Pingyua	CCTV, iQIYI	
TBA	Things Being Hidden	隐瞒之事	TBA	Youku	

=== Short film ===
Year	English title	Chinese title	Role	Ref.
2013	King of Sheng	圣王	Yang Qi	
2013	The Return of the Condor Heroes	神雕侠侣	Yang Guo	
2016	A Hug Let Us Be Less Lonely	给孩子们一个拥抱，爱让我们不孤单		

=== Music video appearances ===
Year	Song title		Singer	Ref.
2013	"Dearest"	亲爱的	Liu Xin	
2015	"Heaven and Earth"	天地	Lin Peng	

=== Theater ===
Year	English title	Chinese title	Role	Ref.
2007	Red Rose and White Rose	红玫瑰白玫瑰	Tong Zhenbao	
2007	The Puppet Master	玩偶之家		
2007	Lodging on Lotus Hill for a Snowy Night	风雪夜归人	Wei Liansheng	
2007	Lust, Caution	色·戒	Mr. Yi	
2008	Prometheus Bound	被缚的普罗米修斯	Prometheus	

== Discography ==
=== Soundtrack appearances ===
Year	Album	English title	Chinese title	Notes/Ref.
2012	Legend of Lu Zhen OST	"Mood"	心情	with Zhao Liying
2013	—N/a	"Sheng Wang"	圣王	Promotional song for Sheng Wang CF
2014	Romance of the Condor Heroes OST	"You and Me"	你我	with Michelle Chen
2014	Romance of the Condor Heroes OST	"Sixteen Years"	十六年	with Liu Xin
2015	—N/a	"Love Like First Sight"	爱如初见	Promotional song for Romance of the Condor Heroes CF with Michelle Chen
2015	Bride Wars OST	"Today You Will Marry Me"	今天你要嫁给我	with Angelababy, Ni Ni & Zhu Yawen
2017	Above the Clouds OST	"Comedy Before Sadness"	悲前喜剧	

== Bibliography ==
Year	English title	Chinese title	Ref.
2013		晨晓——眉眼之间	

== Awards and nominations ==
Year	Award	Category	Nominated work	Result	Ref.
2012	Chinese Campus Art Glory Festival	Most Popular Idol Actor	—N/a	Won	
2013	2nd Asian Idol Awards	Most Promising Actor	—N/a	Won	
2013	BQ Celebrity Score Awards	Popular Idol Award	—N/a	Won	
2013	Youku Young Choice Awards	Most Popular Actor (Mainland China)	—N/a	Won	
2013	5th China TV Drama Awards	Most Marketable Young Actor	Legend of Lu Zhen	Won	
2014	Weibo Award Ceremony	Weibo Popularity Award	Legend of Lu Zhen	Won	
2016	Weibo Award Ceremony	Weibo God	—N/a	Won	
2016	33rd Hundred Flowers Awards	Best Supporting Actor	The Taking of Tiger Mountain	Nominated	
2017	22nd Huading Awards	Best Actor (Ancient Drama)	The Three Heroes and Five Gallants	Nominated	
2017	Asian Influence Awards Ceremony	Best Actor	—N/a	Won	
2017	14th Esquire Man At His Best Awards	Outstanding Mainland Artist	—N/a	Won	
2018	24th Huading Awards	Best Actor (Period Drama)	Wild Rose	Nominated	
2018	3rd China Television Drama Quality Ceremony	Most Popular Actor (Web)	Nothing Gold Can Stay	Won	
2018	3rd China Television Drama Quality Ceremony	Audience's Favorite Quality Star	Nothing Gold Can Stay	Won	
2019	26th Beijing College Student Film Festival	Favorite Actor	Lost in Love	Won	
2019	6th The Actors of China Award Ceremony	Best Actor (Emerald Category)	Love Journey	Nominated	
2019	Golden Bud - The Fourth Network Film And Television Festival	Best Actor	Love Journey, The King of Land Battle	Nominated	
2020	7th The Actors of China Award Ceremony	Best Actor (Emerald)	—N/a	Nominated	
