= Wuzhou Film Distribution =

Chinese film distribution company

- Industry: Film
- Headquarters: China
- Services: Film distribution
- Parent: Wanda Group

Wuzhou Film Distribution (Chinese: 五洲电影发行有限公司) is a Chinese film distribution company owned by Wanda Group.

== Filmography ==
| Title | Release date | Box office gross | Ref. |
|---|---|---|---|
| Tale of the Rally | September 6, 2014 | CN¥12 million | |
| One Step Away | September 19, 2014 | CN¥77 million | |
| Don't Go Breaking My Heart 2 | November 11, 2014 | CN¥199 million | |
| Gone with the Bullets | December 18, 2014 | CN¥515 million | |
| The Taking of Tiger Mountain | December 23, 2014 | CN¥883 million | |
| One Hundred Thousand Bad Jokes | December 31, 2014 | CN¥120 million | |
| Running Man | January 30, 2015 | CN¥434 million | |
| Crazy New Year's Eve | February 6, 2015 | CN¥70 million | |
| Zhong Kui: Snow Girl and the Dark Crystal | February 19, 2015 | CN¥409 million | |
| Let's Get Married | April 2, 2015 | CN¥284 million | |
| Helios | April 30, 2016 | CN¥210 million | |
| Monk Comes Down the Mountain | July 2, 2016 | CN¥401 million | |
| Jian Bing Man | July 17, 2015 | CN¥1,160 million | |
| Wild City | July 30, 2015 | CN¥149 million | |
| Go Away Mr. Tumor | August 13, 2015 | CN¥511 million | |
| Goodbye Mr. Loser | September 30, 2015 | CN¥1,441 million | |
| My Original Dream | November 11, 2016 | CN¥12 million | |
| Oh My God | December 4, 2015 | CN¥57 million | |
| Mojin: The Lost Legend | December 18, 2015 | CN¥1,682 million | |
| Detective Chinatown | December 31, 2015 | CN¥823 million | |
| Kill Time | February 14, 2016 | CN¥13 million | |
| Crouching Tiger, Hidden Dragon: Sword of Destiny | February 19, 2016 | CN¥256 million | |
| The Rise of a Tomboy | March 18, 2016 | CN¥40 million | |
| Chongqing Hot Pot | April 1, 2016 | CN¥370 million | |
| Never Gone | June 8, 2016 | CN¥336.6 million | |
| A Busy Night | July 29, 2016 | CN¥8.8 million | |
| New Happy Dad and Son 2: The Instant Genius | August 19, 2016 | CN¥70.0 million | |
