= Above the Clouds (disambiguation) =

Above the Clouds is a 1933 action drama film directed by Roy William Neill.

Above the Clouds may also refer to:

- Above the Clouds (TV series), a 2017 Chinese television series
- "Above the Clouds", a song by Amber from her 1999 album Amber
- "Above the Clouds", a song by Electric Light Orchestra from their 1976 album A New World Record
- "Above the Clouds", a song by Paul Weller from his 1992 album Paul Weller
- "Above the Clouds", a song by Gang Starr from their 1998 album Moment of Truth
- "Above the Clouds", a 2003 song by Delerium featuring Shelley Harland
- "Above the Clouds", a song by Cyndi Lauper from her 2005 album The Body Acoustic
