= Kill Time (disambiguation) =

To kill time is to be idle.

Kill Time may also refer to:

- Kill Time (film) 2016 Chinese film
- Kill Time Communication Japanese adult comic publisher
- "Kill Time", a song by The Clash from the album Combat Rock 1982
