= Angelababy =

Chinese actress and singer (born 1989)

- 杨颖
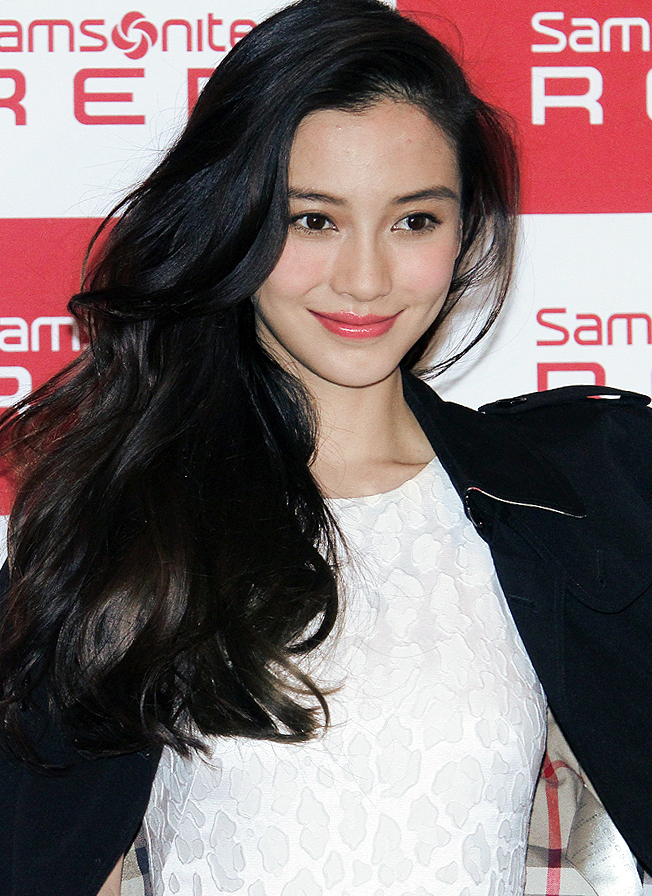
- Angelababy in 2014
- Born: Yang Ying; 28 February 1989 (age 37); Shanghai, China
- Occupations: Actress; model; singer
- Years active: 2003–present
- Agent: Mountain Top
- Spouse: Huang Xiaoming (m. 2015; div. 2022)
- Children: 1

Chinese name
- Traditional Chinese: 楊穎
- Simplified Chinese: 杨颖
Transcriptions
Standard Mandarin
- Hanyu Pinyin: Yáng Yǐng
Yue: Cantonese
- Jyutping: Joeng4 Wing6

Angela Yeung Wing (Chinese: 杨颖; pinyin: Yáng Yǐng; born 28 February 1989), better known by her stage name Angelababy, is a Chinese singer, model and actress. In 2013, she was chosen by Southern Metropolis Entertainment Weekly as one of the New Four Dan Actresses. In 2016, she won the Hundred Flowers Award for Best Supporting Actress for her role in the film Mojin: The Lost Legend. She was a cast member of variety show Keep Running from 2014 to 2023.

== Early life ==
Angelababy was born in Shanghai, China to a Shanghainese mother and a father from Hong Kong, who is of half German and half Chinese descent. Her birth name is Yang Ying (Cantonese: Yeung Wing). Her father runs a fashion business in Shanghai. She gained an interest in fashion as a child under her father's influence.

Yang moved to Hong Kong when she was 13, and signed a modeling contract with Style International Management at 14. Although her English name is Angela, she was sometimes called "Baby" during her primary and secondary school years. She combined these two names to form her stage name, Angelababy.

== Career ==
=== 2007–2009: Beginnings ===
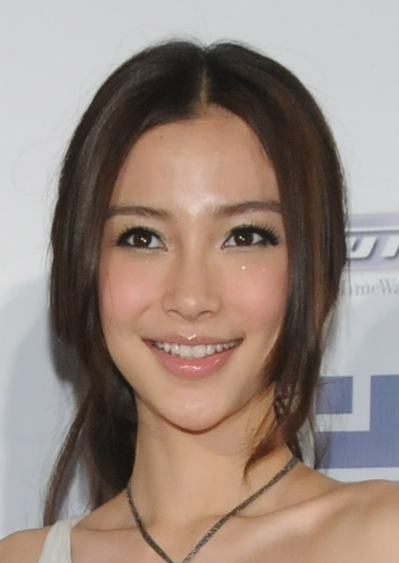
Angelababy in 2011

Angelababy began her career as a model at 14, frequently collaborating with her agency mate Janice Man, presenting themselves as a twin-sister duo. Together, they quickly gained popularity in Hong Kong and co-founded a streetwear brand CHOICE, but their friendship ended in 2008. Angelababy debuted as an actress in the movie Trivial Matters in 2007, where she had a 5-minute cameo appearance in the film, followed by a supporting role in 2009 Hong Kong film Short of Love.

=== 2010–2013: Rising popularity ===
Angelababy had major roles in two films in 2010, before her first leading role in the 2011 film Love You You alongside Eddie Peng. She sang a duet with JJ Lin entitled "Bottom of the Heart" as part of the movie's soundtrack. In 2012, Angelababy starred alongside Mark Chao in romance film First Time, a remake of the 2003 Korean film ...ing. Her performance in First Time won her the Most Anticipated Actress award at the 13th Chinese Film Media Awards. She then starred in both instalments of wuxia film Tai Chi, portraying a martial artist. In 2013, Angelababy starred in Tsui Hark's crime action film Young Detective Dee: Rise of the Sea Dragon, playing a beautiful courtesan. She won the Most Popular Actress award at the 21st Beijing College Student Film Festival for the film.

=== 2014–2022: Mainstream success ===
In 2014, Angelababy joined the cast of Keep Running, the Chinese version of the South Korean variety show Running Man. The series was a major hit in China, and propelled Angelababy into a household name. The same year, she starred alongside fellow Keep Running member Michael Chen in romance film Love on the Cloud, which was a moderate success at the box office. Angelababy was crowned "Weibo Goddess" and "Weibo Queen" for the year 2014.

Angelababy made her Hollywood film debut in Hitman: Agent 47 with a minor role. She then starred in Mojin: The Lost Legend, based on the popular tomb raiding novel series Ghost Blows Out the Light. The film became the highest-grossing Chinese-language IMAX film in China, with US$27.1 million (before being surpassed by The Mermaid). Angelababy won the Best Supporting Actress award at the 33rd Hundred Flowers Awards for her role, but was criticised for her mediocre acting and lackluster performance. The same year, she starred in her first television series, historical drama Love Yunge from the Desert based on Tong Hua's novel Song in the Clouds.

In 2016, Angelababy played a supporting role in the Hollywood science fiction film Independence Day: Resurgence. The same year, she was listed as one of Forbes' inaugural 30 under 30 Asian Celebrities under the film, music, television and sport category. In 2017, Angelababy starred alongside Wallace Chung in the historical drama General and I. Although the drama was a commercial success, she received criticism for her acting and for using stunt doubles. In 2018, she starred in the modern workplace drama Entrepreneurial Age alongside Huang Xuan. In 2019, Angelababy starred in the modern drama My True Friend as a property agent alongside Deng Lun. In 2021, Angelababy was cast in the drama Twilight alongside Ren Jialun.

=== 2023–present: Hiatus and comeback ===
Angelababy's career slowed down since her divorce from Huang Xiaoming in 2022 and was seriously derailed in October 2023, when she reportedly attended Lisa's Crazy Horse show in Paris, France. Some Chinese netizens argued that Angelababy's attendance at such a show violated China's prohibitory regulations on entertainers from participating in activities involving pornography or obscenity, and thus called for her to be banned. On 4 October, the Crazy Horse cabaret stated on Instagram that Angelababy had never attended the show. On 1 November 2023, Angelababy's accounts on various Chinese social media, including Sina Weibo, were muted, while her Douyin account was restricted from being followed (and was later muted as well). Subsequently, CCTV, China's state broadcaster, erased from its Weibo account videos of her performances at national galas, and she withdrew from the hosting group of the show Keep Running after 9 years.

On 30 January 2024, Angelababy's accounts on Weibo, Douyin, and other platforms were unmuted, but she remained partially blacklisted in mainland China. In June 2024, when the Running Man spin-off was broadcast, Angelababy's appearance was censored. The following month, the costume drama Everlasting Longing, starring her, obtained a web drama broadcasting license, signaling her official clearance after the Crazy Horse controversy. In January 2025, Angelababy made her comeback with two web shows: Everlasting Longing, followed by the period thriller Back for You. She has since focused primarily on advertising and live-streaming.

== Personal life ==
In 2005, 16-year-old Angelababy began a relationship with 20-year-old Hong Kong actor William Chan while both hosting children's show Viva! Club Disney. In early 2010, Chan confirmed that the two had broken up. In March of the same year, Chan and Charlene Choi went public with their relationship, admitting they had been dating for three months. Angelababy posted on Weibo, "Do you really believe they've only been dating for three months?" hinting at Chan's infidelity.

Since 2009, Angelababy had been dating Chinese actor Huang Xiaoming, who is 12 years her senior, for six years, but their relationship was not revealed to the public until February 2014. On 27 May 2015, they obtained their marriage certificate in Qingdao, China and their wedding banquet took place in Shanghai on 8 October 2015, with an estimated cost of US$31 million. In October 2016, Huang and Angelababy announced her pregnancy. She gave birth to their son on 11 January 2017 at the Hong Kong Adventist Hospital. They nicknamed their son "Xiaohaimian", meaning "little sponge" in Chinese. On 28 January 2022, they announced their divorce.

== Business and philanthropy ==
Angelababy has invested in several businesses; including a nail parlour, a café (with fellow Hong Kong actor Tony Leung Ka-fai) and a lifestyle store.

In 2015, she set up her own venture capital fund, AB Capital. She then bought shares in Chinese overseas purchasing e-commerce site Ymatou and beverage brand HeyJuice.

In 2016, Angelababy entered the Hurun Philanthropy List, the youngest to be included. She and husband Huang Xiaoming donated US$2.6 million to a charity program initiated by Huang to help university graduates start a business or seek employment.

In 2020, Angelababy and Huang Xiaoming donated CN¥200,000 to hospital relief efforts related to the 2019–20 coronavirus pandemic in Hubei.

In 2021, Angelababy invested in an entertainment company, Cool Style, which was set up by Media Asia and Louis Koo's One Cool Group. Cool Style's business scope includes artist management and related businesses aiming to cultivate new forces with abundant resources and platforms.

In March 2021, Angelababy expressed her support for cotton from Xinjiang, after several companies stopped purchasing the cotton due to concerns about human rights violations.

== Filmography ==
=== Film ===
Year	English title	Chinese title	Role	Notes/Ref.
2006	Under The Lion Rock Band Cream	狮子山下菊带霜	student	
2007	Trivial Matters	破事儿	Tak Nga	
2009	Short of Love	矮仔多情	Angel	
2009	G-Force	超鼠特攻		Voice-dubbed (Cantonese version)
2010	All's Well, Ends Well 2010	花田喜事2010	Princess Pearl of Flowerland	
2010	Hot Summer Days	全城热恋	Xiao Qi	
2011	All's Well, Ends Well 2011	最強喜事	Better	Cameo
2011	Tangled	魔髮奇緣	Rapunzel	Voice-dubbed (Cantonese version)
2011	The Founding of a Party	建党伟业	Xiao Fengxian	
2011	Love in Space	全球热恋	Huang Mudan	
2011	Love You You	夏日乐悠悠	Xia Mi	
2012	A Simple Life	桃姐	Herself	Cameo
2012	First Time	第一次	Song Shiqiao	
2012	Black & White Episode I: The Dawn of Assault	痞子英雄	Fan Ning	
2012	Tai Chi 1: 0	太极1：之零开始	Chen Yuniang	
2012	Tai Chi Hero	太极2: 英雄崛起	Chen Yuniang	
2013	Together	在一起	Lin Shengnan	
2013	Crimes of Passion	一场风花雪月的事	Yue Yue	
2013	Young Detective Dee: Rise of the Sea Dragon	狄仁杰之神都龙王	Yin Ruiji	
2013	Double Cities	双城记		Short film
2013	The Best is Always Here	最好的，一直都在		Short film; Cameo
2013	Who Is Your Dish 2013	谁是你的菜2013	Princess Le	Short film
2014	Temporary Family	失戀急讓	Lui Yuen-ping	
2014	Rise of the Legend	黃飛鴻之英雄有夢	Xiao Hua	
2014	Love on the Cloud	微爱之渐入佳境	Chen Xi	
2015	Running Man	奔跑吧！兄弟	Herself	
2015	You Are My Sunshine	何以笙簫默	He Yimei	
2015	Bride Wars	新娘大作战	He Jing	
2015	Hitman: Agent 47	代號47	Diana Burnwood	
2015	Mojin: The Lost Legend	鬼吹灯之寻龙诀	Ding Sitian	
2016	Kill Time	谋杀似水年华	Tian Xiaomai	
2016	Independence Day: Resurgence	天煞—地球反擊戰2	Rain Lao	
2016	League of Gods	封神传奇	Lan Die	
2016	See You Tomorrow	摆渡人	Ah Yu	
2016	Love O2O	微微一笑很倾城	Bei Weiwei	
2019	The Captain	中国机长		Cameo
2020	I Remember	明天你是否依然爱我	Zhao Ximan	

=== Television series ===
Year	English title	Chinese title	Role	Ref.
2010	Tweet Love Story	恋爱对白 (恋するセリフ)	Li Zi	
2015	Love Yunge from the Desert	大汉情缘之云中歌	Hou Yunge	
2017	General and I	孤芳不自赏	Bai Pingting	
2018	Entrepreneurial Age	创业时代	Na Lan	
2019	My True Friend	我的真朋友	Cheng Zhenzhen	
2020	A Murderous Affair in Horizon Tower	摩天大楼	Zhong Meibao	
2022	The Wind Blows from Longxi	风起陇西	Liu Ying	
2022	Love the Way You Are	爱情应该有的样子	Yin Yi Ke	
2025	Everlasting Longing	相思令	Jun Qi Luo/Jun Fei Fan	
2025	Back for You	漫影寻踪	Luna	
TBA	Tai Chi 3: The Peak is in Sight	生活在别处的我 太极3:巅峰在望 渴望生活	TBA	

=== Variety show ===
Year	English title	Chinese title	Role	Notes/Ref.
2009	Beautiful Cooking	美女廚房	Contestant	TVB variety show
2014–2023	Keep Running	奔跑吧	Cast member	
2017	King of Glory	王者出击	Cast member	
2018	Clash Bots	机器人争霸	Cast member	
2019	Four Try	潮流合伙人	Cast member	
2023	Natural High	现在就出发	Recurring member	

== Discography ==
=== Singles ===
Year	English title	Original title	Album	Notes/Ref.
2010	"Beauty Survivor"			Japanese single
2010	"Love Never Stops"			Japanese single
2010	"Everyday's A Beautiful Story"			Japanese single
2011	"Bottom of the Heart"	海底之心	Love You You OST	with JJ Lin
2012	"Can We Smile Together"	都要微笑好吗	First Time OST	
2012	"Say Goodbye"		First Time OST	
2012	"Happy Together"			with Aarif Rahman
2015	"Today You Will Marry Me"	今天你要嫁给我	Bride Wars OST	with Ni Ni, Chen Xiao & Zhu Yawen
2015	"Green Skirt"	绿罗裙	Love Yunge from the Desert OST	
2019	"Snow Flower Poem"	雪花赋		Performance for CCTV Spring Gala
2019	"Fly"	飞		
2019	"Run for the Dream"	造亿万吨光芒	Keep Running theme song	with Li Chen, Zheng Kai, Zhu Yawen, Wang Yanlin, Lucas Wong and Song Yuqi
2020	"With You by My Side"	有你在身边		Charity song for Coronavirus
2020	"Fearless"	无畏的模样		Charity song for Coronavirus

== Awards and nominations ==
Year	Award	Category	Nominated work	Result	Ref.
2012	Fashion Power Awards	Trendy Public Figure	—N/a	Won	
2012	Mnet Asian Music Awards	Best Red Carpet Style	—N/a	Won	
2013	China's Women Media Awards	Breakthrough Female	—N/a	Won	
2013	Bazaar Jewelry Night	Charity Star Award	—N/a	Won	
2013	Hong Kong Society of Cinematographers Awards	Most Charismatic Actress	—N/a	Won	
2013	9th Huading Awards	Most Popular Actress Elected by Media	—N/a	Won	
2013	13th Chinese Film Media Awards	Most Anticipated Actress	First Time	Won	
2013	1st China International Film Festival London	Best Actress	Crimes of Passion	Nominated	
2014	21st Beijing College Student Film Festival	Most Popular Actress	Young Detective Dee: Rise of the Sea Dragon	Won	
2014	14th Chinese Film Media Awards	Most Anticipated Actress	Young Detective Dee: Rise of the Sea Dragon	Nominated	
2014	3rd iQiyi All-Star Carnival	Asian All-Rounded Idol	—N/a	Won	
2015	Weibo Awards Ceremony	Weibo Goddess	—N/a	Won	
2015	Weibo Awards Ceremony	Weibo Queen	—N/a	Won	
2015	Cosmo Beauty Ceremony	Beautiful Idol Award	—N/a	Won	
2015	4th iQiyi All-Star Carnival	Rising Achievement Award	—N/a	Won	
2016	19th Huading Awards	Best Actress (Ancient Drama)	Love Yunge from the Desert	Nominated	
2016	33rd Hundred Flowers Awards	Best Supporting Actress	Mojin: The Lost Legend	Won	
2016	8th Macau International Movie Festival	Best Actress	Kill Time	Nominated	
2016	Weibo Awards Ceremony	Outstanding Charity Figure	—N/a	Won	
2017	Toutiao Awards	Popular Actress of the Year	—N/a	Won	
2017	Toutiao Awards	Most Commercially Valuable Celebrity	—N/a	Won	
2018	Weibo Award Ceremony	Philanthropy Contribution Award	—N/a	Won	
2018	Weibo Award Ceremony	Hot Search Artist	—N/a	Won	
2018	12th Tencent Video Star Awards	VIP Star	—N/a	Won	
2018	Toutiao Awards	All-Rounded Artist	—N/a	Won	
2019	Hong Kong Society of Cinematographers Awards	Most Charismatic Actress	—N/a	Won	
2019	6th The Actors of China Award Ceremony	Best Actress (Emerald Category)	My True Friend	Nominated	
2019	24th Asian Television Awards	Best Actress in a Leading Role	My True Friend	Nominated	
2019	Golden Bud – The Fourth Network Film And Television Festival	Best Actress	My True Friend	Nominated	
2019	Cosmo Glam Night	Person of The Year (Dream)	—N/a	Won	
2019	16th Esquire Man at His Best Awards	Most Popular Actress	—N/a	Won	
2020	Weibo Awards Ceremony	Weibo Goddess	—N/a	Won	
2021	Weibo Night	Star of the Year	—N/a	Won	
2023	Weibo Night	Annual Quality Actor	—N/a	Won	

=== Forbes China Celebrity 100 ===
Year	Rank	Ref.
2011	88th	
2012	100th	
2013	54th	
2014	55th	
2015	12th	
2017	8th	
2019	14th	
2020	16th	
