= Tong Hua (writer) =

Chinese-American writer

- 桐华
- Born: October 18, 1980 (age 45); China
- Education: Peking University
- Occupations: Novelist, screenwriter
- Writing career
- Pen name: Zhang Xiaosan
- Genre: Romance

Chinese name
- Simplified Chinese: 桐华
- Traditional Chinese: 桐華
Transcriptions
Standard Mandarin
- Hanyu Pinyin: Tóng Huá
Yue: Cantonese
- Yale Romanization: Tùhng Wàh
- Jyutping: Tung4 waa4

Alternative Chinese name
- Simplified Chinese: 张小三
- Traditional Chinese: 張小三
Transcriptions
Standard Mandarin
- Hanyu Pinyin: Zhāng Xiǎosān
Yue: Cantonese
- Yale Romanization: Jēung Síusāam
- Jyutping: Zoeng1 siu2 saam1

Ren Haiyan (Chinese: 任海燕; born 18 October 1980), known by her pen name Tong Hua (Chinese: 桐华; pinyin: Tónghuá) or Zhang Xiaosan (Chinese: 张小三; pinyin: Zhāngxiǎosān), is a Chinese contemporary romance novelist and screenwriter. She graduated from Peking University and emigrated to America in 2005. She currently lives in New York City.

== Works ==
=== Novels ===
English title	Chinese title (Simplified/Traditional)	Pinyin (Mandarin)	Year published	Notes
Scarlet Heart	步步惊心	Bùbù Jīngxīn	2006	Adapted into television series Scarlet Heart starring Liu Shishi, Nicky Wu and Kevin Cheng and Moon Lovers: Scarlet Heart Ryeo starring IU, Lee Joon-gi and Kang Ha-neul
Ballad of the Desert	大漠谣	Dàmò Yáo	2006–2007	Adapted into television series Sound of the Desert starring Liu Shishi, Eddie Peng and Hu Ge; Part 1 of "Damo Qingyuan"
Song in the Clouds	云中歌	Yún Zhōnggē	2007–2008	Adapted into television series Love Yunge from the Desert starring Angelababy, Du Chun and Lu Yi; Part 2 of "Damo Qingyuan"
The Most Beautiful Time (Original title: Secrets Hidden by Time)	最美的时光 (被时光掩埋的秘密)	Zuì Měi De Shí Guāng (Bèi Shíguāng Yǎnmái De Mìmì)	2008	Adapted into television series Best Time starring Wallace Chung and Janine Chang
Time Will Never Go Back (A Book Dedicated to Our Youth)	那些回不去的年少时光	Nàxiē Huí Bùqù De Niánshào Shíguāng	2010	Adapted into television series Stand By Me starring Zhao Jinmai and Bai Yufan
Once Promised	曾许诺	Céng Xūnuò	2011	Adapted into television series A Life Time Love starring Huang Xiaoming and Victoria Song; Part 1 of "The Book of Mountain and Sea"
Once Promised: The End	曾许诺·殇	Céng Xūnuò Shāng	2011	Adapted into television series A Life Time Love starring Huang Xiaoming and Victoria Song; Part 1 of "The Book of Mountain and Sea"
Lost You Forever	長相思	Chǎng Xiàng Sī	2013	Adapted into television series Lost You Forever starring Yang Zi (actress), Zhang Wan Yi (actor), Deng Wei (actor) and Tan Jianci Part 2 of "The Book of Mountain and Sea"
The Memory About You	半暖时光	Ban Nuan Shi Guang	2014	
The Starry Night, The Starry Sea	那片星空 那片海	Na Pian Tian Kong, Na Pian Hai	2015	Adapted into television series The Starry Night, The Starry Sea starring Feng Shaofeng and Bea Hayden
Sorrow Relieving Tune	解忧曲/解憂曲	Jiě Yǒu Qū	2015	Part 3 of "Damo Qingyuan"

=== Screenplays ===
English title	Chinese title (Simplified/Traditional)	Pinyin (Mandarin)	Year published	Notes
Perfect Couple	金玉良缘	Jīnyù Liángyuán	2014	Starring Wallace Huo and Tiffany Tang
The Cage of Love	抓住彩虹的男人	Zhuā Zhù Cǎihóng de Nánrén	2015	Starring Hawick Lau and Zheng Shuang
Destined to Love You	偏偏喜歡你	Piānpiān Xǐhuān Nǐ	2015	Starring Joe Chen, Jia Nailiang and Bosco Wong
A Detective Housewife	煮妇神探	Zhǔfù Shéntàn	2015	Starring Jia Nailiang and Li Xiaolu
Stay with Me	放弃我抓紧我	Fàngqì wǒ Zhuājǐn wǒ	2016	Starring Joe Chen and Wang Kai
