= Zhou Yang (actress) =

Chinese actress (born 1985)

- 周扬
- Born: June 6, 1985 (age 41); Dalian, Liaoning, China
- Education: Beijing Film Academy
- Occupation: Actress
- Years active: 2003–present
- Spouse: Chen Zhenghong (陈正宏) (m. 2017)

Chinese name
- Traditional Chinese: 周揚
- Simplified Chinese: 周扬
Transcriptions
Standard Mandarin
- Hanyu Pinyin: Zhōu Yáng

Zhou Yang (Chinese: 周扬; born 6 June 1985) is a Chinese actress.

Zhou is noted for her roles as Ouyang He and Sophia in the television series Special Mission (2006) and Love You You (2011) respectively.

Zhou has won the Golden Phoenix Award for New Performer, Huading Award for Best Actress and Outstanding Actress Award at the Chinese American Film Festival, and received Golden Eagle Award nomination for Favorite Actress.

== Early life ==
Zhou was born and raised in Dalian, Liaoning. In 1999, Zhou attended the National Dance Competition and finished in second place.

Zhou graduated from Beijing Film Academy, where she studied alongside Liu Yifei, Jiang Yiyan and Zhu Yawen.

== Acting career ==
Zhou made her acting debut in Dancing with the Sunlight, playing Wu Qian.

In 2005, Zhou co-starred with Chen Baoguo and Li Guangjie in the King Goujian of Yue as Xi Shi, who was one of the renowned Four Beauties of ancient China.

In 2006, Zhou won the New Performer Award at the Golden Phoenix Awards for her performance in Special Mission, and was nominated for Favorite Actress Award at the Golden Eagle Awards.

In 2007, Zhou starred in the historical romantic comedy television series Prelude of Lotus Lantern, alongside Liu Xiaoqing and Vincent Chiao.

Zhou played the role of Hong Ying in Sword in the Sky (2008), for which she won the Best Actress Award at the Huading Awards. That same year, she had a cameo appearance in Fit Lover, a romantic comedy film starring Karena Lam, Alec Su, and Huang Xiaoming.

In 2010, Zhou participated in Legend of the Fist: The Return of Chen Zhen, a Hong Kong action film starring Donnie Yen, Shu Qi, and Anthony Wong.

In 2011, for her role as Sophia in Love You You, Zhou won the Outstanding Actress Award at the Chinese American Film Festival.

In 2013, Zhou starred in a historical television series called Zhou Kuangyin with Chen Jianbin, Yin Tao, and Shao Feng.

== Personal life ==
In 2017, Zhou was married to Singaporean financial businessman Chen Zhenghong.

== Filmography ==
=== Film ===
Year	English title	Chinese title	Role	Notes
2004		死亡的诗意	Lin Xing'er	
2008	Fit Lover	爱情呼叫转移2	Xia Xueqing	
2010	Legend of the Fist: The Return of Chen Zhen	精武风云·陈真	Qi Zhishan	
2011	Close to Me	守护童年	Yu Xiaoyu	
2011	Love You You	夏日乐悠悠	Sophia	
2012	Truth or Dare	真心话大冒险		

=== Television ===
Year	English title	Chinese title	Role	Notes
2003	Dancing with the Sunlight	跟着阳光跳舞	Wu Qian	
2005	King Goujian of Yue	越王勾践	Xi Shi	
2005	Old City	老城	Princess	
2006	Special Mission	特殊使命	Ouyang He	
2007	True Colors	本色	Wang Chen	
2007	Tea House	茶馆	Xaio Dingbao	
2007	Prelude of Lotus Lantern	宝莲灯前传	Yang Chan	
2008	Sword in the Sky	中天悬剑	Hong Ying	
2008	Competes Specially	特殊争夺	Xia Zhumin	
2010	Brother Heroes	风云1911	Yue Hua	
2010	Secret Killing List	秘杀名单	Lin Yi	
2010	Latitude and Longitude World	经纬天地	Sheng Yunwei	
2010	Dark War Before Dawn	黎明前的暗战	Sima Nan	
2011	Legend of Wing Chun	咏春传奇	Fang Qi'niang	
2011	Love of Seven Fairy Maidens	天地姻缘七仙女	Princess Cheng'er	
2012	Smoke Everywhere	遍地狼烟	Liu Yan	
2013	War God	战神	Gao Hong	
2013	Zhao Kuangyin	赵匡胤	Jing Niang	
2013	Lone Brave Hero	孤胆英雄	Xiao Hong	
2013	We Get Married	咱们结婚吧	Xu Guangmei	
2014	The King of Guns	绝地枪王	Guo Dashuang	
2015	The King of Guns 2	绝地枪王2	Ma Shanghua	
2015		爱我，你别走	Mo Fei	
2018		向南有小雨	Su Xin	
2018		养母的花样年华	Liu Donghua	
2019	The Elder Brother and Sister's Good Age	哥哥姐姐的花样年华	Wu Mingmei	
2019		战地青春之歌		

== Awards ==
Year	Work	Award	Result	Notes
2008	Special Mission	Golden Eagle Award for Favorite Actress	Nominated	
2009	Special Mission	Golden Phoenix Award for New Performer	Won	
2010	Sword in the Sky	Huading Award for Best Actress	Won	
2011	Love You You	Chinese American Film Festival - Outstanding Actress	Won	
