= ...ing =

- Promotional poster for ...ing
- Hangul: 아이엔지
- RR: Aienji
- MR: Aienji
- Directed by: Lee Eon-hee
- Written by: Kim Jin
- Produced by: Hwang Pil-seon
- Starring: Im Soo-jung; Kim Rae-won; Lee Mi-sook
- Cinematography: Kim Byeong-seo
- Edited by: Lee Hyeon-mi
- Music by: Bang Jun-seok
- Distributed by: Tube Entertainment
- Release date: 24 November 2003
- Running time: 104 minutes
- Country: South Korea
- Language: Korean
- Budget: $3 million

...ing (Korean: 아이엔지; RR: Aienji) is a 2003 South Korean film starring Im Soo-jung, Kim Rae-won and Lee Mi-sook and directed by Lee Eon-hee. The title refers to the present continuous tense in English. Part of the movie were shot in Saipan.

== Plot ==
Min-ah (Im Soo-jung) is a young woman who has become reserved and aloof to the world as a result of her chronic illness and deformed hand. The film quietly portrays the unconventional, yet endearing relationship between Min-ah and her mother Mi-sook (Lee Mi-sook), as well as Min-ah's development as she is befriended by the high-spirited and carefree photographer Young-jae (Kim Rae-won) who moves into their apartment complex.

== Cast ==
- Im Soo-jung as Kang Min-ah
- Kim Rae-won as Young-jae
- Lee Mi-sook as Mi-sook
- Choi Deok-moon as Gi-soo

== Soundtrack ==
No.	Title	Artist	Length
1.	"그녀에게" (Within Her)	Whiru	4:07
2.	"첫사랑" (First Love)	Blue In Green	4:37
3.	"그녀입니다"	Lee Byung-hun (Vanilla Voy)	3:55
4.	"...ing"	Blue In Green	2:38
5.	"Beautiful One"	Junoo	4:22
6.	"Tres Quarto"	Blue In Green	1:42
7.	"기다림" (Waiting)	Yi Sung-yol	3:37
8.	"구름우산" (Cloud Umbrella)	Blue In Green	4:26
9.	"Sunflower"	Lee Ji-sun	4:04
10.	"선물" (Gift)	Blue In Green	3:17
11.	"Bird"	Blue In Green	3:27
12.	"잘있어요...?" (Goodbye...?)	Blue In Green	2:43
13.	"버스" (Bus)	Blue In Green	2:22
14.	"기다림 (Piano Version)" (Waiting (Piano Version))	Kil Eun-kyung	2:10

== Remake ==
A 2012 Chinese remake titled First Time (第一次) starred Angelababy, Mark Chao and Jiang Shan.

== See also ==
- Cinema of Korea
- Contemporary culture of South Korea
- List of Korean-language films
