= Love You You =

2011 Chinese romantic comedy

- Traditional Chinese: 夏日樂悠悠
- Simplified Chinese: 夏日乐悠悠
- Hanyu Pinyin: Xiàrì Lèyōuyōu
- Directed by: Jingle Ma
- Written by: Jingle Ma; Wang Jinqi
- Produced by: Wu Bing; Lin Zixiong; Dan Mintz
- Starring: Eddie Peng; Angelababy; Zhu Yuchen; Zhou Yang
- Cinematography: Chan Kwok Hung
- Edited by: Kwong Chi-Leung
- Music by: JJ Lin
- Production company: DMG Entertainment Media
- Release date: September 30, 2011
- Running time: 90 minutes
- Country: China
- Language: Mandarin
- Box office: ¥5.2 million

Love You You is a 2011 Chinese romantic comedy film directed and written by Jingle Ma, starring Eddie Peng, Angelababy, Zhu Yuchen, and Zhou Yang. The film premiered in China on 30 September 2011.

== Cast ==
=== Main cast ===
- Eddie Peng as You Lele
- Angelababy as Xia Mi
- Zhu Yuchen as Hao Chang
- Zhou Yang as Sophia

=== Other ===
- Alvin Wong as Wuguji.
- Ye Liangcai as JK.
- He Jie as Xia Mi's colleague.

== Music ==
- JJ Lin - Love You You.
- JJ Lin and Angelababy - The Heart of the Sea.

== Production ==
The movie was filmed in Lang Tengah Island, Terengganu, Malaysia.

== Release ==
The film was released in China on September 30, 2011.

== Box office ==
The film grossed ¥5.2 million.

== Award ==
Year	Award	Result	Notes
2011	7th Chinese American Film Festival - Top 10 Films	Won	
2011	7th Chinese American Film Festival - Outstanding New Actress: Zhou Yang	Won	
