= The Rise of a Tomboy =

- Theatrical release poster
- Chinese: 女汉子真爱公式
- Directed by: Guo Dalei
- Written by: Xiong Jianan; Mei Yan; Guo Dalei
- Produced by: Dong Yan; Liu Wenliang; Xu Mason
- Starring: Zhao Liying; Hans Zhang
- Cinematography: Ng Man-Ching
- Production companies: Light & Shadow Factory; Heyi Capital; Guoying Zhiyi (Beijing) Culture Media; Heyi Pictures; Beijing Geliang Media; Trends Star (Beijing) Cultural Media; Guosheng Pictures (Beijing); Beijing Huaren Tiandi Entertainment
- Distributed by: Wanda Media; Wuzhou Film Distribution
- Release date: 18 March 2016
- Running time: 93 minutes
- Country: China
- Language: Mandarin
- Box office: CN¥63.4 million

The Rise of a Tomboy (Chinese: 女汉子真爱公式) is a 2016 Chinese romantic comedy film directed by Guo Dalei and starring Zhao Liying and Hans Zhang. It was released in China by Wanda Media and Wuzhou Film Distribution on 18 March 2016.

== Plot ==
The story is about a university student who believes love has a formula to success and tries to prove it in a month. Her mom left her when she was young and she learnt to be independent and strong. She eventually falls in love, but to prove her formula works she follows her mind instead of her heart, only to realize in the end that true love is about being able to feel the heartbeat of the other person.

== Cast ==
- Zhao Liying
- Hans Zhang
- Jung Il-woo
- Alan Dawa Dolma

== Reception ==
The film opened in third place on its opening weekend in China, with US$5.02 million.
