= Love Journey =

- Promotional image
- Genre: Road-trip; Suspense; Romance
- Written by: Wang Yanzhen
- Directed by: Mao Weining
- Starring: Chen Xiao; Jing Tian; He Minghan; Qin Shan
- Country of origin: China
- Original language: Mandarin
- No. of episodes: 52

Production
- Executive producer: Ge Haiyan
- Production companies: Qixin Century Pictures, Straw Bear Pictures, The Ministry of Public Security Shield Entertainment Center

Original release
- Network: Jiangsu TV; Zhejiang TV
- Release: April 20, 2019

Love Journey (Chinese: 一场遇见爱情的旅行; pinyin: Yī chǎng yùjiàn àiqíng de lǚxíng) is a 2019 Chinese television series directed by Mao Weining, starring Chen Xiao and Jing Tian with He Minghan and Qin Shan. Partly produced by the Ministry of Public Security (China), the series is touted as the first "road-trip drama" in China. It started airing on Jiangsu TV and Zhejiang TV from April 20, 2019.

== Synopsis ==
A white-collar worker Li Xinyue uses a huge sum of money to buy the drawing "Baobei" from famed artist Chu Hongfei. This raises the attention of the police, who suspects that Li Xinyue is affiliated to a drug-trafficking organization they are investigating. They send Jin Xiaotian, an undercover cop, to follow her around. By a chance encounter, the two joins Chu Hongfei's son, Chu Hongjie, in his business project which takes them on a journey to Shangri-la, Li Xinyue's hometown. On the journey, Jin Xiaotian and Li Xinyue falls in love with each other but due to his identity as an undercover cop, Jin Xiaotian is reluctant to confess. However, Li Xinyue finds out the truth when she is kidnapped by the drug trafficking organization in the midst of protecting the drawing "Baobei".

== Cast ==
=== Main ===
- Chen Xiao as Jin Xiaotian (Sky)

An undercover cop working in the Narcotics police department. He appears frivolous, but is ambitious and passionate about his job. He is a jack-of-all-trades, and often uses unpredictable methods in solving crimes. The "problem solver" of the "Love Journey" team.

- Jing Tian as Li Xinyue (Lily)

An ordinary white-collar worker. She is intelligent, brave and tenacious. Her mission is to find out the truth about her father's death 20 years ago, and prove to the world that her father is the real artist of "Baobei". The "route planner" of the "Love Journey" team.

- He Minghan as Chu Zhe Han (Kevin)

A second-generation heir who chases his dreams without fear. Son of Chu Hongfei. Despite his wealthy background, he is humble and willing to work hard. The leader of the "Love Journey" team.

- Qin Shan as Sheng Xia

An internet broadcaster who is bright and full of energy. The tour guide of the "Love Journey" team.

=== Supporting ===
- Ding Yongdai as Lao Feng

Captain of the Narcotics police department. Jin Xiaotian's superior and mentor.

- Liu Wei as Mr. Ouyang

Leader of a drug trafficking squad.

- Li Jing as Hu Zhihui

Subordinate of Mr. Ouyang.

- Wang Ce as Chu Hongfei

A painter who became famous through the drawing "Baobei" and created his own "Snow Mountain Painting" sect. Chu Hongjie's father.

- Liu Yijun as Li Qifeng

Li Xinyue's father. Chu Hongfei's senior. The real artist of "Baobei".

- Na Wei as Mr. Zhao

Boss of a loan and credits company.

- Guan Xinjing as Ah Pei

Chu Hongjie's assistant. The "driver" of the Love Journey team.

- Li Ying as Chen Zhengqian

Chu Hongfei's wife and Chu Hongjie's mother.

== Production ==
The drama began filming in April 2018 and wrapped up filming in July 2018. Filming took place in several locations across China, such as Wuxi, Suzhou, Shanghai, Dali and Shangri-La City.

== Soundtrack ==
No.	Title	Lyrics	Music	Singers	Length
1.	"Love of a Journey (旅行的爱情)" (Theme song)	Ma Tianle	Zhang Ming, Ma Tianle	Samuel
2.	"Pretense (装模作样)"	Lan Youshi	Lan Youshi	Liu Yuning
3.	"Late Love (迟爱)"	Xiao Siqi	Chen Xueran	Yisa Yu
4.	"Sun and Moon (日月)"	Li Runqi	Li Runqi	Silence Wang
5.	"Passing By (路过)"	Xiao Siqi	Chen Xueran	Zhou Yanting
6.	"Where Are You (你在哪里)"	Nicola Tsang	Nicola Tsang	Nicola Tsang
7.	"Dream of a Journey (旅行的梦想)"	Tan Shui	Hu Xiaoou	Mu Mu
8.	"Xiang Bala (香巴拉)"	Tan Shui	Hu Xiaoou	Yangjin Lamu
9.	"Thought of You (想起了你)"	Tan Shui	Hu Xiaoou	Mu Mu
10.	"Wine Song (酒歌)"	Tan Shui	Hu Xiaoou	Peng Zhaxi
11.	"Touched (心动)"	Zhang Ying, Qin Shan	Luo Kun	Qin Shan

== Reception ==
The drama received positive reviews. It was praised for seamlessly weaving the different genres together, providing a well-organized storyline and appropriate pacing of the story (which alternates between tense and relax). It was also praised for its unique theme of showcasing modern youths' love using a road-trip theme.

== Ratings ==
Broadcast date	Jiangsu TV CSM55 ratings			Zhejiang TV CSM55 ratings		
Broadcast date	Ratings (%)	Audience share (%)	Rank	Ratings (%)	Audience share (%)	Rank
2019.4.20	0.756	2.9	3	0.696	2.65	4
2019.4.21	0.723	2.68	5	0.741	2.75	4
2019.4.22	0.778	3.01	4	0.753	2.9	5
2019.4.23	0.831	3.19	5	0.851	3.26	3
2019.4.24	0.942	3.59	2	0.9	3.42	4
2019.4.25	0.902	3.48	4	0.926	3.62	2
2019.4.26	0.969	3.58	2	1.007	3.69	1
2019.4.27	0.97	3.45	2	0.93	3.3	3
2019.4.28	0.89	3.22	3	1.008	3.65	2
2019.4.29	0.997	3.74	2	0.949	3.56	4
2019.4.30	0.921	3.47	5	0.983	3.7	3
2019.5.1	0.791	3.13	4	0.906	3.59	2
2019.5.2	0.826	3.32	4	0.964	3.88	2
2019.5.3	0.813	3.17	4	0.997	3.93	3
2019.5.4	0.933	3.45	3	0.9	3.31	4
2019.5.5	1.11	4.09	3	0.91	3.35	4
2019.5.6	1.019	3.74	2	0.964	3.54	3
2019.5.7	1.043	3.78	2	0.99	3.59	4
2019.5.8	1.034	3.92	4	1.005	3.81	5
2019.5.9	0.963	3.74	3	1.056	4.1	1
2019.5.10	1.011	3.93	3	0.994	3.93	4
2019.5.11	1.043	4.36	1	0.907	3.77	4
2019.5.12	1.113	4.21	1	1	3.78	4
2019.5.13	1.033	4.02	2	0.899	3.5	4
2019.5.14	1.121	4.29	2	1.036	3.96	3
2019.5.15	1.124	4.36	2	1.011	3.91	3
2019.5.16	1.02	4	3	1.214	4.76	1
2019.5.17	1.247	4.74	2	1.017	3.92	3

- Highest ratings are marked in red, lowest ratings are marked in blue

== Awards and nominations ==
Award	Category	Nominee	Results	Ref.
Golden Bud - The Fourth Network Film And Television Festival	Best Actor	Chen Xiao	Nominated	
