= First Time (2012 film) =

2012 Chinese-Hong Kong film by Han Yan

- Directed by: Han Yan
- Screenplay by: Han Yan
- Produced by: Bill Kong
- Starring: Angelababy; Mark Chao; Jiang Shan
- Cinematography: Charlie Lam
- Edited by: Angie Lam
- Music by: Keith Chan; Zhou Jiaojiao
- Production company: BDI Films
- Release date: 8 June 2012
- Running time: 106 min.
- Countries: China; Hong Kong
- Language: Mandarin

First Time (Chinese: 第一次) is a 2012 romance film written and directed by Han Yan. A Chinese-Hong Kong co-production, the film is a remake of the South Korean film ...ing (2003).

== Plot ==
Song Shiqiao (Angelababy), 22, lives with her devoted mother, widowed shop owner Zheng Qing (Jiang Shan). Shiqiao, who always dreamed of being a ballet dancer, cannot exert herself physically as she suffers from form of myasthenia, a neuromuscular disease, that her father died of; the medication she takes also causes memory lapses. One day, at a charity fair, she bumps into Gong Ning (Mark Chao), a former high-school friend she always liked, and the two end up dating, despite the initial disapproval of her mother. Gong Ning dropped out of university to spend more time with a rock band he leads; also, his girlfriend, dancer Peng Wei (Cindy Yen), has dumped him because of his inability to focus his life. However, for Shiqiao, Gong Ning is the perfect partner.

== Cast ==
- Angelababy as Song Shiqiao
- Mark Chao as Gong Ning / Lü Xia
- Jiang Shan as Zheng Qing, Shiqiao's mother
- Cindy Yen as Peng Wei, Gong Ning's ex-girlfriend
- Allen Chao as Gong Ning's father
- Tian Yuan as Gu Qi, rock band member
- Bai Baihe as Wei Jiajia, rival rock singer
- Huang Xuan as Li Rao, Peng Wei's new boyfriend
- Zhao Yingjun as rock band member
- Wu Xiaoliang
- Fan Lin
