= The Bond (TV series) =

- Promotional poster
- Chinese: 乔家的儿女
- Hanyu Pinyin: Qiáo jiā de érnǚ
- Genre: Family, Drama
- Based on: The Children of Qiao Family (乔家的儿女) by Wei Xi
- Written by: Yang Xiaoyan
- Directed by: Zhang Kaizhou
- Starring: Bai Yu; Zhang Wanyi; Mao Xiaotong; Song Zu'er; Zhou Yiran; Liu Jun
- Country of origin: China
- Original language: Mandarin
- No. of seasons: 1
- No. of episodes: 36

Production
- Executive producers: Han Zhijie; Chen Libo; Jiang Xiaoping
- Producer: Hou Hongliang
- Production location: Hengdian World Studios
- Production companies: Daylight Entertainment (Dongyang) Television Ltd; Dexian Film Co., Ltd.

Original release
- Network: Zhejiang Television; Jiangsu Television; Anhui Television; Guangdong Television; Tencent Video
- Release: August 17 – September 8, 2021

The Bond (Chinese: 乔家的儿女) is a 2021 Chinese drama television series based on Wei Xi's novel of the same name, directed by Zhang Kaizhou and starring Bai Yu, Zhang Wanyi, Mao Xiaotong, Song Zu'er and Zhou Yiran. The series airs on Zhejiang TV, Jiangsu TV and Tencent Video from August 17 to September 8, 2021. The series received mainly positive reviews, Douban gave the drama 7.7 out of 10.

== Plot ==
The story highlights the strong bond the five Qiao siblings have with each other after their mother's death, leaving them alone with their selfish father. Life may take each of us in different directions, but the bond forged by the hardships all five siblings endured continues to be strong. Through more than 30 years of development and social change, the five children of the Qiao family: Yicheng, Erqiang, Sanli, Simei and Qiqi, have always supported and relied on each other during difficult times.

== Cast ==
=== Main ===
- Bai Yu as Qiao Yicheng
  - Huang Yi as Qiao Yicheng (teen)
  - Guo Ziming as Qiao Yicheng (young)
- Zhang Wanyi as Qiao Erqiang
  - Liang Jiatong as Qiao Erqiang (teen)
  - Zhang Yuxuan as Qiao Erqiang (young)
- Mao Xiaotong as Qiao Sanli
  - Chen Qianhua as Qiao Sanli (teen)
  - Lin Ruoxi as Qiao Sanli (young)
  - Li Luoyi as Qiao Sanli (child)
- Song Zu'er as Qiao Simei
  - Sun Menghan as Qiao Simei (teen)
  - Zhang Xiwei as Qiao Simei (young)
  - Su Yike as Qiao Simei (child)
- Zhou Yiran as Qiao Qiqi
  - Zhang Bowen as Qiao Qiqi (young)

=== Supporting ===
- Liu Jun as Qiao Zuwang
- Tang Yixin as Xiang Nanfang
- Li Jiahang as Qi Weimin
  - Lu Zihang as Qi Weimin (teen)
  - Liu Kunlong as Qi Weimin (young)
- Zhu Zhu as Ma Suqin
- Liu Lin as Wei Shufang
- Zhang Jianing as Chang Xingyu
- Zhou Fang as Ye Xiaolang
- Qu Zheming as Wang Yiding
- Hou Wenyuan as Qi Chenggang
- Sun Anke as Sun Xiaorong
- Sun Yihan as Wen Ju'an
- Chang Long as Song Qingyuan
- Wang Yueyi as Yang Lingzi
- Xu Xiaohan as Liu Xiaomeng
- Zhu Yongteng as Qi Zhiqiang
- Juan Zi as Mother Xiang
- Feng Hui as Chief Shi
- Wu Qijiang as Uncle Shen
- Xu Baihui as Aunt Fu
- Cui Yi as Aunt Wu
- Wang Lan as Qu Aying
- Guo Ge as Wei Shuying
- Wang Yajun as Yi Ding's mother
- Liang Wenhui as Meng Guizhi
- Li Hongchen as Xiang Beifang

== Ratings ==
- Highest ratings are marked in red, lowest ratings are marked in blue

Broadcast date	Episode #	Zhejiang TV CSM63 ratings			Jiangsu TV CSM63 ratings		
Broadcast date	Episode #	Ratings (%)	Audience share (%)	Rank	Ratings (%)	Audience share (%)	Rank
2021.8.17	1	2.001	7.16	5	2.196	7.85	3
2021.8.19	2-3	2.034	7.16	2	1.663	5.86	7
2021.8.20	4	1.554	5.69	4	2.291	8.35	2
2021.8.21	5	1.586	5.73	5	2.227	8.04	2
2021.8.22	6-7	1.913	6.61	3	2.199	7.61	2
2021.8.23	8-9	1.914	6.71	3	2.194	7.69	2
2021.8.24	10-11	1.915	6.78	4	2.094	7.42	2
2021.8.25	12-13	1.833	6.44	4	2.162	7.62	3
2021.8.26	14-15	1.932	6.79	3	2.123	7.47	2
2021.8.27	16	1.489	5.43	7	2.298	8.36	2
2021.8.28	17	1.763	6.29	4	2.229	7.93	2
2021.8.29	18-19	2	6.9	3	2.197	7.58	2
2021.8.30	20-21	1.951	6.85	4	2.16	7.59	2
2021.8.31	22-23	1.894	6.77	4	2.12	7.6	2
2021.9.1	24-25	2.025	6.96	3	2.045	7.05	2
2021.9.2	26-27	2.318	8.62	2	2.235	8.32	3
2021.9.3	28	2.172	7.93	1	2.071	7.53	3
2021.9.4	29	2.41	8.65	1	1.982	7.1	4
2021.9.5	30-31	2.427	8.55	1	2.122	7.5	3
2021.9.6	32-33	2.225	8.04	2	2.025	7.32	4
2021.9.7	34-35	2.119	7.87	4	2.162	7.99	2
2021.9.8	36	2.234	8.52	2	2.486	9.49	1

== Soundtrack ==
No.	Title	Lyrics	Music	Singers	Length
1.	"Life Should Always Be Bright (生活总该迎着光亮)" (Opening theme song)	Lin Qiao, Liu Enxun	Hou Jianghao	Zhou Shen	04:02
2.	"Flash (灯筒)" (Ending theme song)	Chen Kexin	Wu Shuting	Jin Zhiwen	03:35
3.	"Wild Bird ( 野鸟)"	Wang Zihe, Chen Kexin	Wang Zihe	Jin Runji	04:16
4.	"Wild Bird (野鸟)"	Wang Zihe, Chen Kexin	Wang Zihe	Wang Zihe	04:24
5.	"Space (留白)"	Xiao He	Chen Shimu	Juno Su	04:13

== Awards and nominations ==
Year	Award	Category	Nominated work	Result	Ref.
2021	32nd Huading Awards	Audience's Favorite TV Actor	Bai Yu	Nominated	
2021	32nd Huading Awards	Best Actress (Contemporary Drama)	Mao Xiaotong	Nominated	
2021	32nd Huading Awards	Best Actor (Contemporary Drama)	Zhang Wanyi	Won	
2022	2021 China TV Drama Selection		National Radio and Television Administration	Selected	

== Broadcast ==
Region	Network	Dates	Notes
China (local)	Jiangsu Television, Zhejiang Television	August 17, 2021- September 8, 2021 (Update 2 episodes Every night at 19:30 from Sunday to Thursday, and update 1 episode at 19:30 every night on Friday and Saturday)	Original
China (local)	Tencent Video	August 17, 2021- September 8, 2021 (Exclusive broadcast on the entire network, members will update at 22:00 in the evening, and non-members will be free at 22:00 the next day)	Original
China (local)	Anhui Television	Starting from October 16, 2021 (available every night at 19:00)	Original
China (local)	Guangdong Television	Starting from November 2, 2021 (available every night at 19:30)	Original
China (local)	Shanghai East Movie Channel	Starting from November 4, 2021 (available every night at 19:00)	Original
China (local)	Shaanxi Television News Channel	Starting from November 18, 2021 (available every night at 20:00)	Original
China (local)	Shandong Television Qilu Channel	Starting from November 26, 2021 (available every night at 19:05)	Original
China (local)	Henan Television	Starting from December 10, 2021 (Update 2 episodes every night at 20:15 from Monday to Thursday, and update 1 episode at 21:00 every night on Friday and Sunday)	Original
China (local)	Shanxi Television	Starting from December 15, 2021 (available every night at 19:35)	Original
Malaysia	Astro Shuang Xing 307	August 19, 2021 - (available every night at 19:00)	Original
Vietnam	FPT Play	August 17, 2021- September 8, 2021 (Update 2 episodes Every night from Sunday to Thursday, and update 1 episode every night on Friday and Saturday)	With Vietnamese subtitle
Vietnam	QPVN	December 10, 2021 - January 28, 2022 (Update 1 episode at 10:15 from Monday to Friday)	Dubbed with Vietnamese
Hong Kong	RTHK TV 31	Starting from October 24, 2021 (available every night at 20:30)	Dubbed with Cantonese
Taiwan	EYE TV		
Selected countries in the Americas, Europe, Middle East, South Asia	Viki	Starting from August 20, 2021	With subtitles
