= Wang Hongyi (actor) =

Chinese actor (born 1999)

- Born: March 24, 1999 (age 27); Hangzhou, Zhejiang, China
- Education: Zhejiang University of Technology
- Occupation: Actor
- Years active: 2021–present
- Agent: Star Lotus Pictures

Chinese name
- Simplified Chinese: 王弘毅
- Hanyu Pinyin: Wáng Hóngyì

Wang Hongyi (Chinese: 王弘毅, born March 24, 1999), is a Chinese actor. He is best known for his role as Chishui Fenglong in Lost You Forever (2023).

== Filmography ==
=== Television series ===
Year	Title	Role	Network	Notes	Ref.
2021	Moonlight	Xiao Bai	iQIYI		
2021	Rebirth For You	Zhong Jiu	Tencent Video		
2022	Who Rules The World	Xiu Jiurong	Tencent Video		
2023	Fairyland Romance	Zuo Jinglun	Mango TV		
2023	Lost You Forever	Chishui Fenglong	Tencent Video, Jiangsu TV	Season 1–2	
2024	The Legend of Heroes: Hot Blooded	Yang Kang	Tencent Video		
2024	Snowy Night: Timeless Love	Miao Feng	iQIYI		
2025	Filter	Quan Shengtang	Tencent Video		
2025	A Moment But Forever	Tang Hua	iQIYI, Youku		
2025	Serendipity	Song Qingzhao	Tencent Video		
2025	Sword and Beloved	Qing Cheng	iQIYI		
2026	Unsettled Case	Family of Four Member	CCTV, Youku		
TBA	Mo Ran	Liu Jincheng	Youku		
TBA	San Xian Mi Hui	Zong Hang	Tencent Video		
TBA	In the Moonlight	Luo Jia / Sudan Gu	Tencent Video		
TBA	The Noble	Zhou Yuanhan	Tencent Video		
TBA	Revenge	Song Ling	Tencent Video		

== Awards and nominations ==
Year	Award	Category	Nominee(s)/Work(s)	Result	Ref.
2023	Tencent Video Star Awards	Best Newcomer in a Television Series	Wang Hongyi	Won	
2024	Tencent Video Star Awards	Best Promising Television Actor of the Year	Wang Hongyi	Won	
