= Zhang Wanyi =

Chinese actor (born 1994)

- 张晚意
- Born: Zhang Wanyi (张晚意); 22 April 1994 (age 32); Shiyan, Hubei
- Education: Beijing Film Academy
- Occupation: Actor
- Years active: 2017–present

Zhang Wanyi (Chinese: 张晚意; born 22 April 1994) is a Chinese actor. He is best known for his roles in The Awakening Age, The Bond, Lost You Forever, The Rise of Ning and Are You the One.

== Early life ==
Born in Shiyan City, Hubei, Zhang Wanyi's parents had him at a late age, thus named him 晚 (late) 意 (affection/meaning), meaning he is a late gift to them and they cherish him very dearly. Zhang learned to play the piano from second grade. In 2013, he entered Beijing Film Academy.

== Career ==
=== 2017–2019 ===
In 2017, Zhang starred as Gao Bo in Tracks in the Snow Forest, and made an appearance on the variety show Super Music to promote the drama. In 2018, he starred as Kong Jie in Operation Moscow, and made his cinematic debut in the Chinese film Really?. In 2019, he starred in The Communist Liu Shaoqi and My True Friend.

=== 2021 ===
In 2021, Zhang took on his first antagonist role, starring as Prince Cao in Weaving A Tale of Love. He then starred as Chen Yannian (Chinese: 陈延年) in The Awakening Age, a historical and political drama that celebrated the 100th anniversary of the Chinese Communist Party. His role and acting left a lasting impression on viewers, and he went on to receive many awards with this role, including Best Youth Actor (Drama Series) at the 8th Wen Rong Awards. He also starred as Qiao Erqiang in The Bond, which won him the Best Actor award at the 32nd Huading Awards.

=== 2022–2023 ===
In 2022, Zhang's roles in The Awakening Age and The Bond won him more awards, and he went on to star as the male lead in PLA Air Force. This was his first lead role in his career.

In 2023, he starred as Cang Xuan in Lost You Forever S1. The series broke records and generated buzz on the national and international scale, including winning 9 awards at the Tencent Video Golden Penguin Awards 2023. This role also earned him a nomination for Best Actor at the 28th Asian Television Awards. He also starred as Chen Xingjie in A Long Way Home and Chen Hui in the medical drama Fantastic Doctors. His roles in Lost You Forever S1 and A Long Way Home won him the Most Popular Actor (TV Series) at the Tencent Video All Star Night 2023. He was also one of the winners of VIP Star of the Year.

== Filmography ==
=== Television series ===
Year	English title	Chinese title	Role	Ref.
2025	Si Jin	似锦	郁锦 / Yu Jin	
2024	The Rise of Ning	锦绣安宁	罗慎远 / Luo Shenyuan	
2024	Are You The One	柳舟记	崔行舟 / Cui Xingzhou	
2024	Lost You Forever S2	长相思 第二季	玱玹 / Cang Xuan	
2023	I Love You	我知道我爱你	赵晋 / Zhao Jin	
2023	Fantastic Doctors	非凡医者	陈辉 / Chen Hui	
2023	A Long Way Home	父辈的荣耀	陈兴杰 / Chen Xingjie	
2023	Lost You Forever S1	长相思 第一季	玱玹 / Cang Xuan	
2022	PLA Air Force	勇敢的翅膀	秦朗 / Qin Lang	
2021	Weaving A Tale of Love	风起霓裳	曹王 / Prince Cao	
2021	The Awakening Age	觉醒年代	陈延年 / Chen Yannian	
2021	The Bond	乔家的儿女	乔二强 / Qiao Erqiang	
2021	The Coolest World	最酷的世界	梁一达 / Liang Yida	
2019	The Communist Liu Shaoqi	共产党人刘少奇	少年刘少奇 / Young Liu Shaoqi	
2019	My True Friend	我的真朋友	傅晓宁 / Fu Xiaoning	
2018	Operation Moscow	莫斯科行动	孔杰 / Kong Jie	
2017	Tracks in the Snow Forest	林海雪原	高波 / Gao Bo	
TBA	Shan Yao De Jing Hui	闪耀的警徽	公孙坚决 / Gongsun Jianjue	
TBA	Clouded Leopard Operation	云豹行动	段捷 / Duan Jie	
TBA	Be with Me	但愿人长久	孙竞成 / Sun Jingcheng	
TBA	Wei Da De Chang Zheng	伟大的长征		

=== Film ===
Year	English title	Chinese title	Role	Ref.
2024	Mufasa: The Lion King	狮子王：木法沙传奇	刀疤	
2018	Really?	我说的都是真的	猴子	

=== Variety show ===
Year	English title	Chinese title	Episode	Ref.
2024	Mao Xue Woof	毛雪汪	EP 79	
2023	Play the Play	剧说很好看	20230910	
2023	Hello, Saturday	你好，星期六	20230819	
2023	Hello, Saturday	你好，星期六	20230708	
2023	Hello, Saturday	你好，星期六	20230513	
2022	Ace vs Ace	王牌对王牌 第七季	20220506	
2021		导演请指教	EP 2	
2021	Happy Camp	快乐大本营	20210828	
2017	Super Music	超强音浪 第三季		

== Awards and nominations ==
Year	Ceremony	Award	Nominated work	Results	Ref.
2023	Tencent Video All Star Night 2023	VIP Star of the Year		Won	
2023	Tencent Video All Star Night 2023	Most Popular Actor of the Year (TV Series)		Won	
2023	2023 GQ Men of the Year Awards	Upward Force of the Year		Won	
2023	第八届中国网络视频学院榜	Best Male Lead	PLA Air Force	Won	
2023	28th Asian Television Awards	Best Male Lead	Lost You Forever	Nominated	
2022	6th Golden Bud Network Film and Television Festival	年度口碑男演员	The Awakening Age / The Bond	Won	
2022	影视榜样 2021 年度总评榜	Best Supporting Actor	The Awakening Age	Won	
2021	The 32nd Huading Awards	Best Actor (Contemporary TV Series)	The Bond	Won	
2021	2021 中国年度新锐榜	Emerging Actor of the Year	The Awakening Age / The Bond	Won	
2021	8th Wen Rong Awards	Best Youth Actor (Drama Series)	The Awakening Age	Won	
