= Lost You Forever =

- Promotional poster
- Also known as: Sauvignon Blanc
- Chinese: 长相思
- Genre: Historical; Fantasy; Romance
- Based on: Lost You Forever by Tong Hua
- Written by: Tong Hua
- Directed by: Qin Zhen (Chief Director); Yang Huan
- Starring: Yang Zi; Zhang Wanyi; Deng Wei; Tan Jianci Dai Luwa; Wang Hongyi
- Opening theme: "Nothing is as Good as You" by Jason Zhang
- Ending theme: "Favor Mortal Fireworks" by Hu Xia & Zhang Zining
- Country of origin: China
- Original language: Mandarin
- No. of seasons: 2
- No. of episodes: 39 (season 1); 23 (season 2)

Production
- Producers: Li Liming; Tang Panjing; Xiao Sha; Yang Xiaoxin
- Production locations: Xiangyang; Hengdian World Studios
- Running time: 45 mins
- Production companies: Tencent Penguin Pictures; Star Lotus Pictures

Original release
- Network: Tencent
- Release: 24 July – 16 August 2023

Lost You Forever (Chinese: 长相思; pinyin: Chang Xiang Si) is a 2023 Chinese television series based on the novel Lost You Forever, the last part of The Books of Mountain and Sea series by Tong Hua. The series is directed by Qin Zhen and Yang Huan. It stars Yang Zi, Zhang Wanyi, Deng Wei, Tan Jianci, Dai Luwa and Wang Hongyi in the lead roles.

The first season premiered on Tencent starting 24 July and ended its run on 16 August. The series was a commercial and critical success both domestically and internationally.

== Plot ==
=== Season 1 ===
Humans, deities and demons coexisted in ancient time under the rule of three kingdoms: Xiyan, Chenrong and Haoling. Xiao Yao grew up in the royal family of Xiyan with her cousin Cang Xuan at a time when Xiyan and Chenrong were at war against each other. Her mother, the adopted daughter of the King of Xiyan General Xiling Heng went to the war and defeated Chenrong army at the cost of her own life. Chenrong lost and was conquered by Xiyan. After her mother's death, Xiao Yao was sent to the Jade Mountain. When no one went to get her back, she escaped from there, experienced many hardships and difficulties for many years, lost her royal heritage and forgot her own appearance. 300 years later, she disguises herself as a man and start to live in Qingshui Town while running a clinic under the name of Wen Xiaoliu. Here she saves a man named Tushan Jing who is the future leader of Qingqiu Tushan Clan. Tushan Jing discovers she is a woman and begins to fall for her. She also meets Chenrong's military advisor General Xiang Liu, a nine headed snake demon who takes interest in her because of her disguise and her blood's healing power but gradually falls in love with her. Later Xiao Yao and Xiang Liu share the lovers bug. Cang Xuan also comes to Qingshui town looking for her. After many twist and turns, he discovers her identity and takes her back to Haoling. Xiao Yao regains her true appearance and her identity as the Eldest Princess of Haoling.

=== Season 2 ===
Fangfeng Bei disrupts the wedding of Xiao Yao and Feng Long.

== Cast ==
=== Main ===
- Yang Zi as Xiao Yao / Wen Xiao Liu / Haoling Jiu Yao / Xiling Jiu Yao
  - Wang Motong as Xiao Yao (young)
  - Ma Yirui as Xiao Yao (young)

Eldest princess of Haoling, daughter of Xiling Heng and granddaughter of King of Xiyan. Grew up in Xiyan with her cousin Cang Xuan. She was sent to Jade Mountain after her mother's death but escaped from there. Enduring many hardships and difficulties for 300 years, she posed as a man and started living in Qingshui Town as Doctor Wen Xiao Liu. Here she saved Tushan Jing, the future clan leader of Qingqiu Tushan clan and crossed path with Chen Rong's military advisor Xiang Liu. After being discovered by Cang Xuan, she went back to Haoling as the eldest princess.

- Zhang Wanyi as Xiyan Cang Xuan
  - Li Zhenzhen as Cang Xuan (young)

Son of Xiyan Zhong Yi, grandson of King of Xiyan and the only legitimate heir to the throne. Grew up in Xiyan with his cousin Xiao Yao. He visited various places in central plain in order to find Xiao Yao and gain experience. After finding her in Qingshui Town, he took her back to Haoling. He wanted to ascend to the throne by any means to protect her. He loves Xiao Yao but married Chenrong Xin Yue, Haoling Yi and Tao Shuhui to make alliance with their family. He unified Xiyan and Haoling as one kingdom.

- Deng Wei as Tushan Jing / Ye Shiqi
  - Zhang Jingyi as Tushan Jing (young)

A nine tailed fox, the second son and heir of Qingqiu Tushan Clan and Xiao Yao's lover. He was kidnapped and tortured by Tushan Hou and was abandoned in Qingshui Town. After being saved by Wen Xiao Liu (Xiao Yao), he stayed in Huichun Hall as Ye shiqi and fell in love with her. he inherited the position of Tushan Clan leader after regaining his status and identity. He was framed by his fiancée Fangfeng Yi Ying and had to leave Xiao Yao to marry Yi Ying. He is shrewd but trusted his family too easily.

- Tan Jianci as Xiang Liu / Fangfeng Bei

A nine-headed snake demon and Chenrong's military advisor. Has nine heads and nine lives but only one heart. Because of curiosity and to heal his wounds, he kidnapped Wen Xiao Liu (Xiao Yao) several times. He loved Xiao Yao but never expressed it. He stayed with her for 37 years and gave up his lives to save her from death. He took the appearance of Fangfeng Bei as the real Bei died and asked him to take care of his elderly mother before his death. Taught Xiao Yao archery for self-defense. Xiao Yao discovered his identity.

- Dai Luwa as Ah Nian / Haoling Yi

Second princess of Haoling, Cang Xuan's wife and daughter of Concubine Jing'an. Because of her and her mother's resemblance to Xiling Heng, she was pampered by King of Haoling and Cang Xuan since childhood. She didn't like Xiao Yao at first and made things difficult for her but later became close with her. She was made Queen of Xiyan by Cang Xuan.

- Wang Hongyi as Chishui Feng Long

Son of Chenrong Yi, the lord of Zhiyi City, Chenrong Xin Yue's twin brother, Cang Xuan's friend and a descendant of Chenrong Royal Family. Uses his mother's surname. Has a very sunny personality. Values career and friendship over love. He first liked Xiao Yao because of her identity as a princess but later got attracted by her wisdom and courage and became her fiancée.

=== Supporting ===
==== Xiyan Royal Family ====
- Hou Changrong as King of Xiyan
  - Father of Xiyan Zhong Yi, adoptive father of Xiling Heng and grandfather of Cang Xuan and Xiao Yao. He always wanted to pass the throne to Cang Xuan. So he waited for Cang Xuan to return to Xiyan after his training.
- Wang Zhen as Chenrong Xin Yue
  - Daughter of Chenrong Yi, the lord of Zhiyi City, Cang Xuan's wife and Chishui Feng Long's twin sister. As she was a descendant of Chenrong Royal Family, she was monitored by the King of Xiyan since childhood. She fell in love with Cang Xuan at first sight.
- Wang Lejun as Ruoshui Chang Pu
  - Head of Ruoshui Clan, wife of deceased Xiyan Zhong Yi and mother of Cang Xuan. Committed suicide after avenging her husband and was buried with him.
- Feng Xiaoli as Xiling Xie
  - Queen of Xiyan, mother of Xiyan Zhong Yi, adopted mother and teacher of Xiling Heng. She died after the death of Cang Xuan's parents.
- Wu Hong as Xiyan Yi Peng
  - 9th Prince of Xiyan. Was stabbed to death by Ruoshui Chang Pu.
- Gong Zhengnan as Xiyan Yu Yang
  - 7th Prince of Xiyan.
- Sun Wei as Xiyan De Yan
  - 5th Prince of Xiyan.
- He Shankai as Xiyan Shi Ran
  Li Lingye as Shi Ran (young)
  - Son of Xiyan Yu Yang.
- Wang Luetao as Xiyan Yue Liang
  Zhou Yuchen as Yue Liang (young)
  - Son of Xiyan De Yan.
- Li Shuman as Xiaoxiao
  - Cang Xuan's subordinate and secret guard.
- Liu Binglu as Ling Lan
  - Chenrong Xin Yu's maid.

==== Haoling Royal Family ====
- Zheng Guolin as King of Haoling
  - Nominal father of Xiao Yao and father of Ah Nian. He regarded Xiao Yao and Cang Xuan as his own child. He entrusted the Kingdom of Haoling and Ah Nian to Cang Xuan and lived in Chaoyun Palace in Xiyan Mountain.
- Jin Feng as Xiling Heng / Concubine Jing'an
  - Mother of Xiao Yao, ex-wife of King of Haoling and the adopted daughter of King of Xiyan. Died in the battle between Xiyan and Chenrong while leading the Xiyan Army as the Princess General. She was in love with Chi Chen.
  - Concubine of King of Haoling and Ah Nian's mother. She is deaf and mute. King of Haoling married her because of her resemblance to Xiling Heng.
- Ding Jiawen as Ru Shou
  - Descendant of the Qinglong Tribe of Haoling, Ah Nian's cousin and bodyguard.He and Ah Nian grew up together. He is loyal to King of Haoling for generations.
- Shang Xuan as Hai Tang
  - Ah Nian's maid and bodyguard.

==== Qingqiu Tushan Clan ====
- Ye Xiaowei as Tushan Hou
  Luo Zishuo as Tushan Hou (child)
  - A nine tailed fox and the oldest son of Tushan family. Due to his illegitimate birth, Tushan Jing's mother despised him which fueled his jealousy and hatred towards Jing. He kidnapped and tortured Jing, seduced his fiancée Fangfeng Yi Ying and framed him with her help. He was killed by Yi Ying.
- Huang Cancan as Fangfeng Yi Ying
  - Eldest daughter of Fangfeng family, Fangfeng Bei's half sister and Tushan Jing's fiancée. Because of Tushan Hou's scheme, she mistook Hou as Jing and fell in love with him and helped him frame Jing. After she realized the betrayal of Tushan Hou, she died with him. She was very good in archery.
- Tang Qun as Mrs Tushan
  - A nine tailed fox, Matriarch of Tushan family and grandmother of Tushan Jing and Tushan Hou. She raised her two grandson with her daughter in law. She drugged Tushan Jing hoping he will marry Fangfeng Yi Ying.
- Gao Rong as Jing Ye
  - Maidservant of Tushan family. Grew up with Tushan Jing. Loyal to him.
- Jia Boya as Lan Xiang
  - Maidservant of Tushan family. Grew up with Tushan Jing. She was used by Tushan Hou and betrayed Jing.
- Deng Shiyun as Xuan Zhou
  - Fengfeng Yiying's maid and secret guard.
- Chen Ruoxi as Lan Mei
  - Tushan Hou's wife but was a maidservant of Tushan family before. She discovered Tushan Hou and Fengfeng Yiying's relationship and hinted Tushan Jing about this. She was killed afterwards.

==== Qingshui Town ====
- Chen Chuan as Lao Mu
  - The clerk of Huichun Hall, a low level deity and a deserter from Xiyan Army. Wen Xiaoliu regards him as his brother.
- Gao Xuanming as Chuan Zi
  - Human orphan raised by Wen Xiaoliu and Lao Mu from childhood. Studied medicine with Wen Xiaoliu in Huichun Hall but didn't make any progress. Fell in love with Sang Tian'er and married her.
- Pu Tao as Sang Tianer
  - Chuan Zi's wife and a human. Worked in a brothel before marrying Chuan Zi. Studied medicine from Wen Xiaoliu and became a physician. She was very grateful to Wen Xiaoliu for teaching her medical skills. When Xiao Yao visited Qingshui town after many years, she was still alive.
- Sun Kai as Ma Zi
  - Human orphan raised by Wen Xiaoliu and Lao Mu from childhood. Studied medicine with Wen Xiaoliu in Huichun Hall but didn't make any progress. Fell in love with Chun Tao and married her.
- Peng Doudou as Chun Tao
  - Ma Zi's wife and a human. Daughter of Butcher Gao.
- Chen Jianan as Rabbit Spirit
  - Owner of food shop in Qingshui town. Wen Xiaoliu's patient.
- He Yunwei as Mr Stone
  - Storyteller and the stone spirit of Qingshui town.

== Production ==
On 28 March 2022, Lost You Forever began filming in Hengdian. It officially wrapped up on 25 September of the same year. The series focused on using real locations rather than green screen. The simple yet beautiful Qingshui town was completely built by the crew. It took them six months to build the town on an open space of 20,000 square meters. The crew also worked very hard to build the royal palace.

== Soundtrack ==
Lost You Forever Original Soundtrack (长相思 电视原声音乐专辑)
No.	Title	Lyrics	Music	Singers	Length
1.	"Nothing is as Good as You (万物不如你)" (Opening theme song)	Chen Xi	Dong Dongdong	Jason Zhang	04:00
2.	"See and Miss One Another (相见相思)" (Lovesickness song)	Tong Hua	Dong Dongdong	Yang Zi	01:48
3.	"Lost You Forever (长相思)" (Xiao Yao's theme song)	Chen Xi	Chen Xi, Dong Dongdong	Yisa Yu	04:20
4.	"Favor Mortal Fireworks (偏爱人间烟火)" (Ending theme song)	Chen Xi	Dong Dongdong	Hu Xia & Zhang Zining	04:34
5.	"With or Without You (有你无你)" (Cang Xuan's theme song)	Tong Hua	Dong Dongdong	Mao Buyi	04:55
6.	"Mortal Heart (凡人心)" (Interlude)	Chen Xi	Dong Dongdong	Chen Zhuoxuan & Zhao Lei	04:05
7.	"Healing (愈)" (Tu Shanjing's theme song)	Tong Hua	Dong Dongdong	Wang Zhengliang	04:10
8.	"Can't Wait (等不到的等待)" (Xiang Liu's theme song)	Tong Hua	Dong Dongdong	Tan Jianci	04:19
9.	"Favor Mortal Fireworks (偏爱人间烟火)" (Promotional song)	Chen Xi	Dong Dongdong	Yang Zi & Tan Jianci	04:34
10.	"A Vine On A Tall Mountain (高高山上一根藤)" (Children's song)	Tong Hua	Dong Dongdong	Yang Zi	01:37
11.	"Chen Rongshi (辰荣士)" (War song)	Tong Hua	Dong Dongdong	International Principal Philharmonic Choir	01:23

== Reception ==
The series was commercially successful, placing first on all the audience data chart during its broadcast. The series was praised for its well-constructed storyline, the fusion of historical and fantasy elements, compelling narrative and visually appealing scenes as well as the excellent performance of the actors. It also received positive reviews, scoring a 7.8 on Douban.

== Accolades ==
Award	Year	Category	Nominee(s)	Result	Ref.
The 6th Original Intent List	2023	Top Five Young Directors of the Year	Qin Zhen	Won	
The 6th Original Intent List	2023	Recommended Outstanding Work of the Year	Lost You Forever Season 1	Won	
9th Wenrong Awards Ceremony	2023	Best Work of the Year from an Online Platform	Lost You Forever Season 1	Won	
2022-2023 Weibo TV Series List	2023	Most Influential Ancient Costume Drama	Lost You Forever Season 1	Won	
2023 Weibo TV & Internet Video Summit	2023	Influential Work of the Year	Lost You Forever Season 1	Won	
2023 Weibo TV & Internet Video Summit	2023	Innovative Communication Work of the Year	Lost You Forever Season 1	Won	
2023 Tencent Video Golden Penguin Awards	2023	Audience Favorite Drama of the Year	Lost You Forever Season 1	Won	
2023 Tencent Video Golden Penguin Awards	2023	Members' Favorite Drama of the Year	Lost You Forever Season 1	Won	
2023 Tencent Video Golden Penguin Awards	2023	Outstanding Director of the Year	Qin Zhen	Won	
2023 Tencent Video Golden Penguin Awards	2023	Outstanding Producer of the Year	Tang Panjing	Won	
2023 Tencent Video Golden Penguin Awards	2023	Best Screenwriter of the Year (Original)	Tong Hua	Won	
2023 Tencent Video Golden Penguin Awards	2023	Best Styling of the Year	Chen Tongxun	Won	
2023 Tencent Video Golden Penguin Awards	2023	Best Soundtrack of the Year	Chen Xi, Dong Dongdong	Won	
2023 TV Series Awards	2023	Drama of the Year	Lost You Forever Season 1	Won	
2023 TV Series Awards	2023	Drama Characters of the Year	Xiao Yao, Cang Xuan, Tushan Jing, Xiang Liu	Won	
2023 Datawin Awards	2023	Outstanding Drama	Lost You Forever Season 1	Won	
2023 Datawin Awards	2023	Highest Prosperity for an Ancient Costume Drama	Lost You Forever Season 1	Won	
Cover News (封面新闻)	2024	Top 10 2023 Hall of Fame Annual Drama List	Lost You Forever Season 1	Won	
2023 Weibo Night	2024	Drama of the Year	Lost You Forever Season 1	Won	
Film and TV Role Model 2023 Annual Ranking	2024	Most Popular Actress	Yang Zi	Won	
National Radio and Television Administration	2024	2023 Chinese Drama Selection	Lost You Forever Season 1	Won	
National Radio and Television Administration	2024	Excellent Online Audio-visual Works of 2023 Q3	Lost You Forever Season 1	Won	
2024 Spring Capital TV Program Forum & Market	2024	Quality TV Series of the Year	Lost You Forever Season 1	Won	
2024 Television Directors Conference	2024	TV Series of the Year	Lost You Forever Season 1	Won	
2024 Golden Bud Network Film and Television Festival	2024	Quality TV Series of the Year	Lost You Forever Season 1	Won	
2024 Golden Bud Network Film and Television Festival	2024	Quality Director of the Year	Qin Zhen	Won	
29th Shanghai Television Festival	2024	Best Actress	Yang Zi	Nominated	
29th Shanghai Television Festival	2024	Best Adapted Screenplay	Tong Hua, Wang Jing	Nominated	
29th Shanghai Television Festival	2024	Best Art Direction	Lost You Forever Season 1	Nominated	
