= A Busy Night =

- Poster
- Chinese: 情况不妙
- Directed by: Wang Li
- Written by: Wang Li
- Starring: Li Jing; Cao Yunjin; Ma Li; Cica Zhou; Lam Suet
- Production companies: Beijing Hairun Pictures; HG Entertainment; Sun Entertainment Culture
- Distributed by: Wuzhou Film Distribution; Huaxia Film Distribution
- Release date: 29 July 2016
- Running time: 91 minutes
- Country: China
- Language: Mandarin
- Box office: CN¥8.8 million

A Busy Night is a 2016 Chinese comedy film directed by Wang Li. It was released in China by Wuzhou Film Distribution and Huaxia Film Distribution on 29 July 2016.

== Plot ==
Guohua Securities Chairman Du Jianfeng is secretly planning to flee to the United States with his daughter and ill-gotten gains. His assistant Zhou Yang and his girlfriend Lily are planning to extort money from him before he leaves. But man proposes, God disposes. Niu Dawei, who comes to the city to look for his wife, accidentally disrupts his plan. In the end, good is rewarded with good, and evil is punished with evil.

== Cast ==
- Li Jing
- Cao Yunjin
- Ma Li
- Cica Zhou
- Lam Suet
- Joy Sheng
- Paul Chun

== Reception ==
The film grossed CN¥8.8 million at the Chinese box office.
