= Ballad of the Desert =

Book by Tong Hua

- Covers of Taiwanese edition
- Author: Tong Hua
- Cover artist: Wu Sha (design)
- Language: Chinese
- Series: Love in the Han Dynasty (大汉情缘) series
- Genre: Historical romance
- Publisher: Henan Literature Publishers (河南文艺出版社)
- Publication date: November 2006 – January 2007
- Publication place: China
- Media type: Print (Paperback)
- Pages: 234 (Volume One); 257 (Volume Two)
- ISBN: 978-7-80623-701-4
- Followed by: Song in the Clouds

Ballad of the Desert
- Traditional Chinese: 大漠謠
- Simplified Chinese: 大漠谣
Transcriptions
Standard Mandarin
- Hanyu Pinyin: Dàmò Yáo

Ballad of the Desert (also known as Damo Yao, or "大漠谣") is a two-volume Chinese Han dynasty romance novel written by author Tong Hua. Both parts were published by Henan Literature Publishers sequentially in 2006 and 2007. This novel is the first in the Love in the Han Dynasty trilogy. A notable feature of the series is the intertwining of the characters' stories between volumes, even though each novel is also a story in its own right.

The second novel in the trilogy, Song in the Clouds, was released on 1 September 2009, whilst the third novel, Sorrow Relieving Tune, is currently being written (the publishing date is not yet known).

== Plot ==
Orphaned Yu Jin was raised by wolves in the desert before a Han living with a Xiongnu tribe took her back to camp. She soon became friends with the Xiongnu children, including Yu Chan, Yizhixie, and Mudaduo. One year later, due to political changes, her foster father was murdered. His only wish was for her to return to his hometown Chang'an, in the Han dynasty.

Thus, Yu Dan tried to help her flee the Xiongnu territory, but soon found out that Yi Zhi Xie, the new clan leader, had sent soldiers to pursue them. To save Yu Jin, Yu Dan persuaded her to stay in the wild desert and return to the wolf pack she had grown up with while he kept going, leading the soldiers on a wild goose chase. Years later, a teenage Yu Jin met the disabled Meng Jiu (Meng Ximo), who was part of a traveling merchant's caravan and then saved Huo Qubing (under the alias of Xiao Huo) and his comrades while they were fleeing the desert bandits on the way back to Chang'an. Yu Jin introduced herself as Jin Yu, remembering her foster father's last wish she asked for some traveling money from Huo Qubing as repayment. Huo gave her the money, but then requested that she lead them out of the desert. Jin Yu did not realize that Xiao Huo was actually the Han general Huo Qu Bing. After leading them out of the desert, she sets off towards Chang'an by herself.

Just outside Chang'an, she met some beggars and soon befriended a young one. The young beggar told her that while he was begging on the streets, he heard that people could find work by offering to wash clothes. With that as her hope, she entered Chang'an and started looking for work. Everyone refused her offer, until she came across someone who gave her buns in return for her hard labor. Unbeknownst to Jin Yu, this kind Aunt Hong Gu was actually the chief of the house of dancing and performance, who sought to recruit the young beauty. Nevertheless, Jin Yu soon rose to be the head of it (due to Meng Jiu's help) to improve this business. She developed a friendship with Hong Gu, who remained one of Jin Yu's closest friends. Jin Yu also acquainted Li Yan, a secretive girl who would later rise to be one of Emperor Wu of Han Liu Che's most powerful concubines due to the former's aid.

Jin Yu reunited with Meng Jiu who revealed that he was the head of the Shi Manor's family trading business. Through their time together, Jin Yu quickly became enamoured with the young master. Unfortunately, he repeatedly rejected her affection due to his handicap, even though she had affirmed that it was not a problem. Heartbroken, Jin Yu seriously considered Huo (who had always loved her, despite the fact she didn't reciprocate his love earlier on) as someone who was more than a friend. Meanwhile, Li Yan had grown powerful and was intent on killing Jin Yu, the only one who knew her secret. Jin Yu had to heavily rely Huo to protect her. From this, she gradually loved him. When Meng Jiu realized his loss, he wanted Jin Yu to return to his side, but it was too late.

Throughout the novel, Jin Yu survived the palace schemes and political changes, only wanting to be with her husband. At the height of danger, they feigned death to escape the circumstances. Meng Jiu, once he successfully aided Jin Yu and Huo Qubing, quietly departed.

== Adaptations ==
A 35-episode drama adaptation of the novel, Sound of the Desert, has been produced by Chinese Entertainment Shanghai, with Cecilia Liu, Eddie Peng and Hu Ge as the leads. The drama finished filming on 2 July 2012 and aired on Hunan Television from 1 October to 27 November 2014.
