= Deng Wei (actor) =

Chinese actor (born 1995)

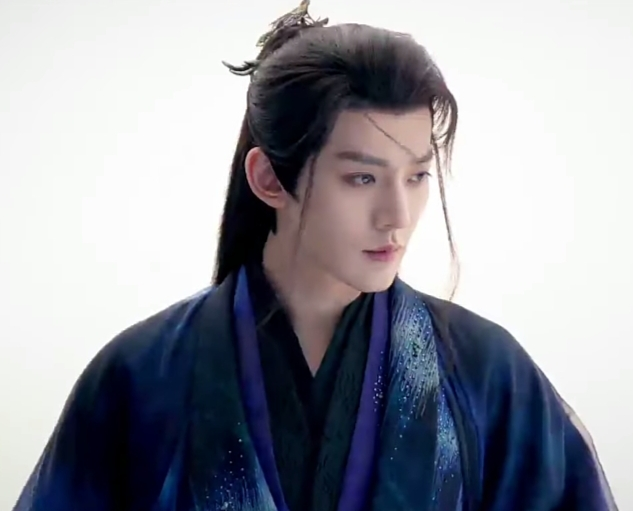
- Deng for the drama Love of the Divine Tree
- Born: February 26, 1995 (age 31); Hohhot, Inner Mongolia, China
- Education: Central Academy of Drama
- Occupation: Actor
- Years active: 2020–present
- Height: 183 cm (6 ft 0 in)

Chinese name
- Simplified Chinese: 邓为
- Hanyu Pinyin: Dèng Wéi

Deng Wei (Chinese: 邓为; pinyin: Dèng Wéi, born February 26, 1995) is a Chinese actor. He is best known for his roles as Xiao Lin in Till The End Of The Moon (2023), Tushan Jing in Lost You Forever (2023–24), and Su Yishui in Love of the Divine Tree (2025).

== Early life and education ==
Deng was born on February 26, 1995, in Hohhot, Inner Mongolia, China. He graduated from Central Academy of Drama.

== Filmography ==
=== Television series ===
Year	Title		Role	Network	Ref.
Year	English	Chinese	Role	Network	Ref.
2021	Miss the Dragon	遇龙	Tian Guxing / Xue Qianxun	Tencent Video	
2021	I Am the Years You Are the Stars	我是岁月你是星辰	Qian Cheng	Tencent Video	
2022	Sassy Beauty	潇洒佳人淡淡妆	Jie Ke	iQIYI	
2023	The Journey of Chong Zi	重紫	Qin Ke	Tencent Video; Mango TV	
2023	Till the End of the Moon	长月烬明	Xiao Lin / Sang You / Gongye Jiwu	Youku	
2023	Lost You Forever Season 1	长相思 第一季	Tushan Jing / Ye Shiqi	Tencent Video iQIYI	
2024	Lost You Forever Season 2	长相思 第一季	Tushan Jing / Ye Shiqi	Tencent Video iQIYI	
2025	Love of the Divine Tree	仙台有树	Su Yishui	iQIYI; WeTV	
2026	The Legend of Rosy Clouds	云秀行	Zheng Shi / Lou Qiyan	iQIYI	
TBA	The Days of Seclusion and Love	风月不相关	Yin Gezhi / Yin Chenbi	iQIYI	

== Awards and nominations ==
Year	Award	Category	Nominee(s)/Work(s)	Result	Ref.
2024	iQIYI Scream Night	Asia Pacific Newcomer Actor of the Year	Deng Wei	Won	
2025	iQIYI Scream Night	Most Popular Actor of the Year	Deng Wei	Won	
