= Sound of the Desert (TV series) =

Chinese TV series

- Promotional poster
- Also known as: Ballad of the Desert
- Genre: Historical fiction Romance
- Based on: Ballad of the Desert by Tong Hua
- Written by: Huang Weijian; Ou Yuxian; Chen Xiang; Jiang Chunlei; Zhang Yuling
- Directed by: Lee Kwok-lap
- Starring: Liu Shishi; Eddie Peng; Hu Ge
- Opening theme: The World I Pacified for You by Li Jianqing
- Ending theme: A Kind of Courage Called Giving Up by Della Ding
- Composer: Zhou Sixian
- Country of origin: China
- Original language: Mandarin
- No. of episodes: 35 (Hunan TV version: 36)

Production
- Executive producer: Luze Liang
- Producer: Karen Tsoi
- Production location: China
- Cinematography: Jiang Jizheng; Shi Guangzhu; Lin Zhihao; Li Xinchao
- Editors: Wang Jianjun; Wang Yi
- Running time: 45 minutes
- Production company: Chinese Entertainment Shanghai

Original release
- Network: Hunan Television
- Release: 1 October – 27 November 2014

Sound of the Desert
- Traditional Chinese: 風中奇緣
- Simplified Chinese: 风中奇缘
Transcriptions
Standard Mandarin
- Hanyu Pinyin: Fēng zhōng qí yuán

Sound of the Desert (Chinese: 风中奇缘) is a 2014 Chinese television series based on the historical romance novel Ballad of the Desert by Tong Hua. It stars Liu Shishi, Eddie Peng and Hu Ge. The series aired on Hunan TV from 1 October to 27 November 2014.

== Synopsis ==
Jin Yu (Liu Shishi), an orphan girl of Xiongnu ethnicity, was raised by wolves in the desert, until a Han Chinese decided to adopt her. Two years later, following the death of her adoptive father due to political changes, she decides to follow the man's wish and flees to Jian'an, the capital of Western Han dynasty, changing her name to Xin Yue. Along her journey, she meets Mo Xun (Hu Ge), a calm and kind disabled man, and later the handsome, cold general Wei Wu Ji (Eddie Peng). In Jian'an, thanks to her determination, Xin Yue becomes the head of a dance house and helps a quiet girl named Qin Xiang (Fala Chen) to meet the Emperor. Qin Xiang then turns into the Emperor's most powerful concubine and schemes against Xin Yue. In the meantime, Xin Yue's past with the Xiongnu catches up with her when she meets her childhood friend, Hu Wei Li (Qin Hao), who is now the Ruler of the Damo plains.

While battling against the onslaught of her painful childhood memories and the political intrigue of the royal family, Xin Yue must also choose between Mo Xun and Wei Wu Ji.

== Cast ==
=== Main ===
- Liu Shishi as Xin Yue (莘月)

An orphan girl of Xiongnu ethnicity who was raised by wolves in the desert; Xin Yue is free-spirited, brave, straightforward and dares to love and hate. After she arrives in Jian'an, she uses her wits and intelligence to gain a foothold in the city.

- Eddie Peng as Wei Wu Ji (卫无忌)

The capable young general of the Southern dynasties, and beloved nephew to the Emperor. A master tactician and warrior, he has led continuous victories on the battlefield. Arrogant and proud, he refuses to be governed by anyone else, and loves once and for all time. This character is based on Huo Qubing.

- Hu Ge as Mo Xun (莫循)

Also known as the Ninth Master, Mo Xun is the reserved and contemplative owner of the largest business in Jian'an; the Shi Enterprise. He is also the Emperor's nephew, known for his wide influences in the Damo Plains, as well as his kindness and generosity toward its citizens - who hail him as the "Great Man". He loves Xin Yue but is afraid to tell her because of his disability.

- Fala Chen as Qin Xiang (秦湘)

A dancer in Luo Yu Fang who befriends Xin Yue, and later receives her help to enter the palace. Her true intention is to get close to the Emperor and seek revenge for her mother's death. After becoming the most powerful concubine, she turns against Xin Yue who refuses to help her because of Wei Wu Ji. She loves Li Ji but gives up their relationship for the sake of fulfilling her promise. She is based on Consort Li.

- Qin Hao as Hu Wei Li (胡伟立)

Ruler of the Damo Plains, and Xin Yue's childhood sweetheart. In order to usurp the throne, he killed Xin Yue's adoptive father and the Crown Prince, sacrificing the love and friendship between him and Xin Yue. He has lofty ambitions, and engaged in a long-term war with the Southern dynasties in order to seek power and control the whole country. Ultimately, he was defeated by Wei Wu Ji.

=== Supporting ===
==== People in Luo Yu Fang ====
- Kristal Tin as Hong Gu (红姑), head of Luo Yu Fang and Xin Yue's best friend
- Zhang Xiang as Qin Yuanqi (秦元琪), Qin Xiang's brother
- Xu Sa as Ding Ling (丁玲), a dancer in Luo Yu Fang and Qin Yuanqi's wife
- Qin Yong as Qin Yuanchao (秦元超)
- Zhang Lei as Wu Ye (吴爷)
- Luo Mi as Xin Yan (心砚)
- Wan Nien as Shuang Shuang (双双)
- Lu Yuanyuan as Qiu Xiang (秋香)

==== People in the palace ====
- Lu Liang as Emperor Zhao Zhen (赵徵)
- Maggie Cheung Ho-yee as Empress Wan Zijin (万子衿)
- Shi Xiaoqun as Princess Zhao Yang (昭阳公主), younger sister of the Emperor
- Wu Zhuohan as Wan Qian (万谦), a powerful general and Wei Wu Ji's uncle; Princess Zhao Yang's husband and Empress Wan's brother
- Liu Shuailiang as Wan Ang (万昂)
- Chen Xuming as Sima Zan (司马瓒), a powerful officer; Empress Wan's brother-in-law
- Chang Jin as Sima Lie (司马烈)
- Liu Chao as Crown Prince Zhao Ju (赵砥)
- Zhang Yindi as Aunty Yun (云姨)

==== People of Xiongnu ====
- Cai Yatong as Mao Yunzhu (冒云珠), Xin Yue's childhood friend; she loves Hu Weili and is jealous of his love toward Xin Yue.
- Ruan Weijing as Hei Shi (黑石), Xin Yue's childhood companion
- Dilraba Dilmurat as Lady Ji (骊姬), a dancer from an external tribe and Hei Shi's wife.
- Su Mao as Xin Yue's adoptive father (阿爹)
- Qiang Yu as Crown Prince Mu Rongfeng (慕容峰)

==== People around Wei Wu Ji ====
- Han Dong as Li Ji (李佶), Wei Wu Ji's lieutenant and close friend. He loves Qin Xiang and is willing to do anything for her.
- Wu Ying as Wei Shao'er (衛少兒), Wei Wu Ji's mother
- Han Zhenghua as Uncle Chen (陈叔)
- Zhang Shan as Zhao Mengshan (赵孟山)
- Zhou Yancheng as Chen Yanguang (陈雁光)
- Zhao Wenhao as Li Cheng (李诚)

==== People in Shi Enterprise ====
- Deng Limin as Uncle Shi (石伯)
- Wang Chunyuan as Shi Jinyan (石谨言)
- Wang Feng as Shi Shenxing (石慎行)
- Li Weiting as Shi Feng (石风)

== Production ==
Filming for the series started on 8 March 2012 and ended on 2 July 2012. Originally cast in the role of the leading male role, Hu Ge decided to take on the role of the second male lead instead, as it was a type of character he has never played before.

Subsequent review by SARFT claimed the series of falsifying historical accounts. Extensive changes were thus required, resetting the entire premise to take place in a fictional era in a fictional country. Character names from the novel which were based on Chinese historical figures were changed, and dialogues and subtitling were revised.

Early titles of the series were Ballad of the Desert (大漠谣, Dàmò yáo, also known as A Story of the Wolf Girl), Romance of the Desert (大漠奇缘, Dàmò qí yuán) and The Legend of Moon and Star (星月传奇, Xīng yuè chuánqí).

== Soundtrack ==
1. The World I Pacified for You (為你平定的天下) – Li Jianqing
2. A Kind of Courage Called Giving Up (有一种勇气叫放弃) – Della Ding
3. Bai Touyin (白頭吟) – Della Ding
4. Live Well (好好過) – Hu Ge

== Ratings ==
Episode #	Original broadcast date	Average audience share (CSM50)	
Episode #	Original broadcast date	Ratings	Audience share
1-2	1 October 2014	1.144	5.790
3-4	2 October 2014	1.066	5.550
5-6	8 October 2014	0.568	3.283
7-8	9 October 2014	0.649	3.716
9-10	15 October 2014	0.560	3.441
11-12	16 October 2014	0.568	3.364
13-14	22 October 2014	0.538	3.385
15-16	23 October 2014	0.614	3.784
17-18	29 October 2014	0.662	3.961
19-20	30 October 2014	0.606	3.488
21-22	5 November 2014	0.550	3.297
23-24	6 November 2014	0.675	3.934
25-26	12 November 2014	0.728	4.435
27-28	13 November 2014	0.695	4.092
29-30	19 November 2014	0.684	4.098
31-32	20 November 2014	0.699	4.355
33-34	26 November 2014	0.737	4.363
35-36	27 November 2014	0.930	5.176

== Awards and nominations ==
Year	Award	Category	Nominated work	Result	Ref.
2014	6th China TV Drama Awards	Most Popular Actor	Hu Ge	Won	
2015	2nd Hengdian Film and TV Festival of China	Best Supporting Actor	Han Dong	Won	

== International broadcast ==
Country	Network	Airing dates
South Korea	CHING	November 10, 2014 - (Monday to Friday at 17.20)
Taiwan	CTi Entertainment	December 8, 2014 - (Monday to Friday from 20:00 to 21:00.)
Taiwan	CTV Main Channel	December 8, 2014 - (Monday to Friday from 21:00 to 22:00.)
Taiwan	CHT MOD	December 15, 2014 - (Monday night - Friday night)
Singapore	Jia Le Channel	December 17, 2014 - ( Monday to Friday from 22:00 to 23:00.)
United States	KTSF	January 2, 2015. - ( Monday to Friday from 21:00 to 22:00.)
Thailand	Channel 3 SD	1 November 2017 - on air (Tuesday - Thursday from 21:00 pm to 22:00 pm)
