= Kill Time (film) =

2016 Chinese-Hong Kong film by Fruit Chan

- Poster
- Chinese: 谋杀似水年华
- Directed by: Fruit Chan
- Screenplay by: Fruit Chan; Li Qianxun
- Produced by: Albert Lee; Yang Rong; Wu Tao
- Starring: Angelababy; Ethan Juan; Zhang Juck; Rayza; Hao Lei
- Cinematography: Lam Wah-Chuen
- Edited by: Fruit Chan
- Music by: Henry Lai Wan-man
- Production companies: Wanda Media; Beijing Gutian Media; Emperor Motion Pictures; Wanda Pictures (Qingdao); Tencent Video; TIK Films (Beijing) Pictures; Iqiyi Pictures; Beijing Xinjingbao Media
- Distributed by: Wuzhou Film Distribution; Wanda Pictures (Qingdao)
- Release dates: 14 February 2016 (China); 10 March 2016 (Hong Kong)
- Running time: 102 minutes 128 minutes
- Countries: China; Hong Kong
- Language: Mandarin
- Box office: CN¥13.3 million (China)

Kill Time (Chinese: 谋杀似水年华) is a 2016 romance suspense crime film directed by Fruit Chan. A Chinese-Hong Kong co-production, the film was released on 14 February 2016, in China by Wuzhou Film Distribution and Wanda Pictures and was released in Hong Kong on 10 March 2016.

== Plot ==
Tian Xiaomai, an urban white-collar worker, is about to enter the marriage hall with her fiancé Shengzan, but Tian's father's death in the line of duty breaks the quiet happiness. When sorting out the relics, Tian Xiaomai accidentally discovered her father's investigation notes, but unexpectedly she was caught in a mysterious murder case that ended in vain more than ten years ago. This case also evoked Xiaomai's painful but deep-rooted first love memories when she was young. At the same time, Xiaomai learned from her bestie Qian Ling that there is an online store called "Witch District", where you can buy everything, even love memories. But after she bought a mysterious purple scarf, various accidents followed one after another, and everything seemed to be related to the unsolved case and her young lover Qiushou. Tian Xiaomai investigated the clues of the unsolved case of the year, and searched for her first love Qiushou through the "Witch District". But as the investigation deepened bit by bit, Tian Xiaomai found that her love was closely entangled with the murder case, and even Shengzan's family was involved.

== Cast ==
- Angelababy
- Ethan Juan
- Zhang Juck
- Rayza
- Hao Lei
- Huang Jue
- Yin Zhusheng
- Pan Hong
- Kou Zhenhai
- Lam Suet
- Song Ning

== Reception ==
The film has grossed CN¥13.3 million in China.
