= Above the Clouds (TV series) =

2017 Chinese television series

- Directed by
- Starring: Chen Xiao
- Country of origin: China
- Original language: Mandarin

Production
- Production location: China

Original release
- Network: Shenzhen Television
- Release: 23 February – 28 May 2017

Above the Clouds
- Simplified Chinese: 云巅之上
Transcriptions
Standard Mandarin
- Hanyu Pinyin: Yun Zhi Shang

Above the Clouds is a 2017 Chinese television series. Season 1 premiered on iQIYI on February 23, 2017, and Season 2 premiered on iQIYI on March 30, 2017. The series began airing in the Prime-Time Theater slot on Shenzhen Satellite TV on May 2, 2017.

== Cast ==
- Chen Xiao as Tang Fei
- Yuan Shanshan as Jian Xi
- Bai Yu as Mu Ge
- Zhang Zhehan as Ke Luo

== Soundtrack ==
Sung by Yisa Yu and Zhang Zhehan

== Reception ==
=== Ratings ===
China Dragon TV / Jiangsu TV premiere ratings (CSM50)
Episodes	Broadcast date	Dragon TV					
Episodes	Broadcast date	Ratings (%)	Audience share (%)	Rankings	Ratings (%)	Audience share (%)	Rankings

== Awards and nominations ==
Year	Award	Category	Recipient	Result	Ref.

== International broadcast ==
Channel	Location	Broadcast start date	Note
Shenzhen TV	People's Republic of China (the Mainland.)	23 February 2017	
