= Du Chun =

Chinese actor

- 杜淳
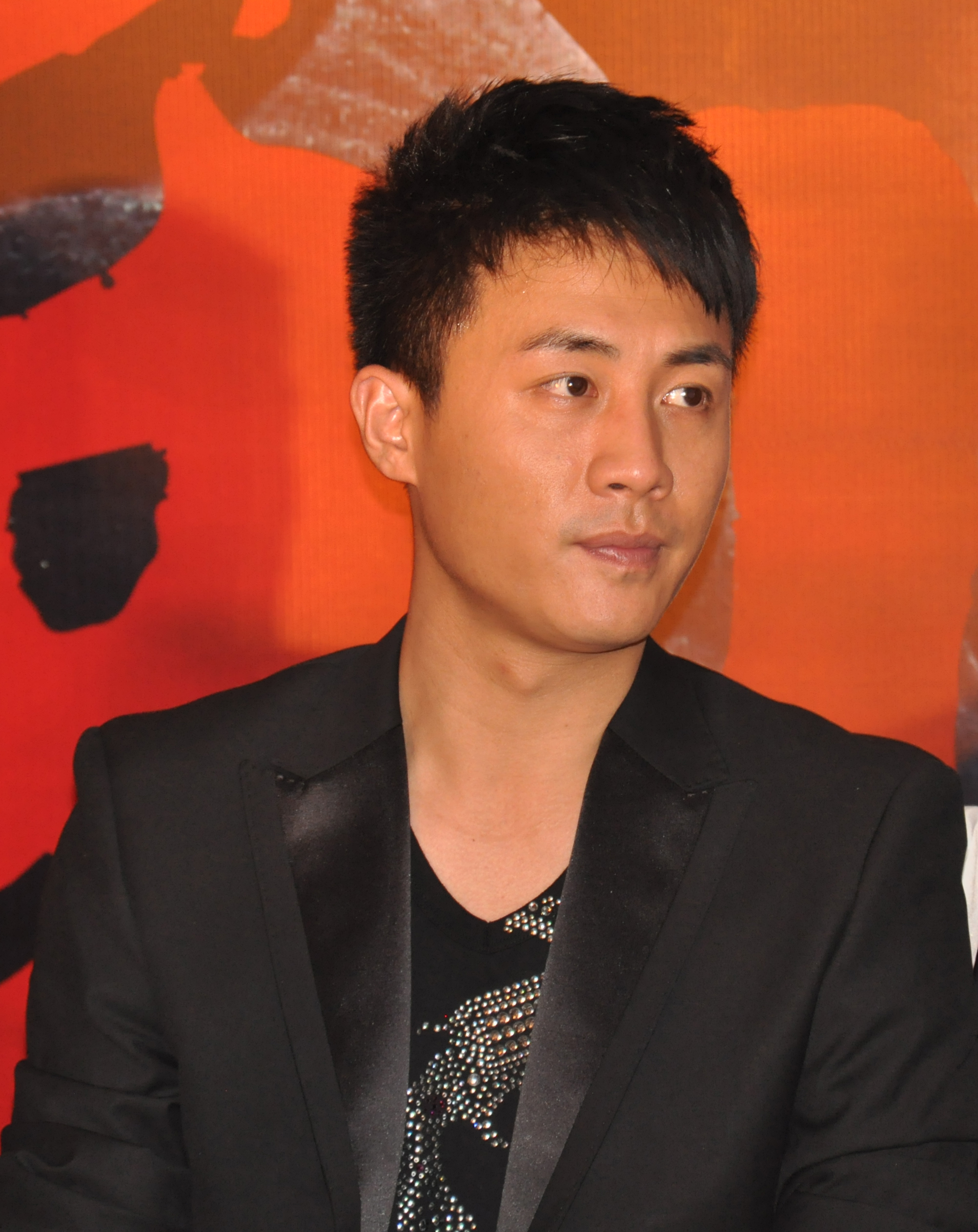
- Du at a news conference for Down the South We Go on 26 January 2010 in Beijing
- Born: Hebei, China
- Education: Beijing Film Academy
- Occupation: Actor
- Years active: 2003–present
- Agent: Huayi Brothers
- Parents: Du Zhiguo (father); Yang Li (mother)

Chinese name
- Chinese: 杜淳
Transcriptions
Standard Mandarin
- Hanyu Pinyin: Dù Chún

Du Chun (Chinese: 杜淳; pinyin: Dù Chún) is a Chinese actor.

== Early life ==
Du Chun was born in Hebei, China. His parents are also in the performing business. His father, Du Zhiguo is also an actor, and his mother, Yang Li, is a dancer and dancing instructor. At the age of 11, Du Chun got admitted to The Dance School of Central University of Nationalities (CUN) (i.e. Minzu University of China), one of the key disciplinary bases of national minority arts and the cradle of ethnic dancers, to fulfill his mother's dream to be trained professionally in one of the top dancing schools in China. After graduation, he applied for Central Academy of Drama but failed. After one year of preparation, Du was admitted into Beijing Film Academy in 1999 with one of the highest admission test scores even though he did not take the regular middle and high school courses.

== Career ==
In 2003, Du auditioned for a minor role in the historical drama The Emperor in Han Dynasty. But after the audition, the director decided to give him cast him in the role of the young Emperor instead. He showed his acting talent on portraying an ambitious and playful young leader which established his acting career. Du then starred in The Prince of Han Dynasty, portraying a Han dynasty general named Li Ling.

In 2007, he was selected as a leading role in a Wuxia drama, The Legend of the Banner Hero, which is adapted from Gu Long's novel. The drama was one of the most popular of the year and was selected as the Best Costume Drama of 2007.

The same year, Du was selected to star in the patriotic drama Logistics Depot 51, a remake of a classic Chinese spy movie during World War II. Following the drama, Du rose in popularity and was hailed as one of the new generation patriotic idols. He won the Best Actor award at the TVS Award Ceremony.

He then starred in another patriotic drama Emigrate to the West. The drama registered an average viewing rate of 9.6 percent, the highest rating for a CCTV series since 2002. He received a best actor nomination in the 41st Monte Carlo TV festival.

Du moved on to idol dramas next. In 2010, he starred in the romantic comedy series Rent a Girlfriend for the New Year. The drama was well-received by viewers, who praised the drama for being heartwarming and meaningful. The same year, he starred in the family drama Puberty hit Menopause, which won him the Most Popular Actor award at the China Student Television Festival.

In 2011, Du starred in the time-travel romantic drama Fight and Love with a Terracotta Warrior, a remake of the classical movie played by Zhang Yimou and Gong Li. The same year, he played Ximen Qing, a notorious playboy figure in Chinese classical literature All Men Are Brothers.

In 2012, Du starred in the youth drama Beijing Youth, directed by Zhao Baogang. The drama, about teens in Beijing struggling against the strict and traditional culture of their parents, was well received among young Chinese audiences. The same year, he starred in the historical time-travel hit Palace II and rose in popularity.

In 2013, Du starred in the drama Hello 30 Years Old, which also talks about the struggles of youths born after 80s and resonated with the audience. The same year, he played Li Shimin in the historical drama Heroes in Sui and Tang Dynasties.

In 2015, Du starred in the historical romance drama Love Yunge from the Desert, based on Tong Hua's novel Song in the Clouds. The same year, he starred in the family drama Pretty Wife.

== Filmography ==
=== Film ===
Year	English title	Chinese title	Role	Notes	Ref.
2011	The Founding of a Party	建党伟业	Xu Deheng		
2012	Back to 1942	一九四二	Secretary		
2012	On My Way	跑出一片天			
2013	Love Transplantation	幸福速递			Cameo
2013	I Want to See Messi				
2014	Unexpected Love	谁说我们不会爱	Xin Xiaoye		
2016	The Wasted Times	罗曼蒂克消亡史			
2017	Mad Ebriety	断片之险途夺宝	Zhi Guo		
2018	The Faces of My Gene	祖宗十九代	Mei Xiwang		
2020	The Eight Hundred	八佰	Xie Jinyuan		
2022	The Battle at Lake Changjin II	长津湖之水门桥			
2022	Ordinary Hero	平凡英雄	Chen Liang		
2023	The Volunteers: To the War	志愿军：雄兵出击	Ye Zilong		
TBA	The Three-Body Problem	三体	Wei Cheng		

=== Television series ===
Year	English Title	Chinese Title	Role	Notes/Ref.
2003	The Emperor in Han Dynasty	汉武大帝	Young Liu Che	Guest appearance, ep. 16–24
2004	Vixen Executive	少女总裁	Jiang Nanyu	
2004	The Censor of Qing Dynasty	大清御史之云南铜案	Xiao Duo	Cameo
2004	The Prince of Han Dynasty	大汉天子2	Li Ling	
2004		公民良心	Chang Yang	
2005	Judge of Song Dynasty	大宋提刑官	Meng Shushi	Guest appearance, ep. 33–39
2005		大阿哥溥俊	Fu Xing	
2005	Yellow River Homage	大河颂	Kangxi Emperor	
2006		监察局长	Ji Feng	
2006	Pretty Girls in Jianghu	江湖俏佳人	Hei Mu	
2007	The Legend of the Banner Hero	大旗英雄传	Tie Zhongtang	
2007	Love with No Regret	爱无悔	Du Haoran	
2007	Prince to Pauper	换子成龙	Lin Junshan	
2007	Logistic Depot 51	51号兵站	Little Boss/Liang Hong	
2008	Mistaken Son	非亲父子	Qiao Xiaodong	
2008	Enemy Camp for 18 Years	敌营十八年	Jiang Bo	
2008		龙虎山客栈	Lin Chong	Cameo
2009	Emigrate to the West	走西口	Tian Qing	
2009	Enemy Camp for 18 Years 2	虎胆雄心(敌营十八年2)	Jiang Bo	
2009	Chinese Family	中国家庭	Yan Chuan	
2010	To the South We Go	南下	Meng Siyuan	
2010	Nanny and Security Guard	保姆与保安	Li Guoling	
2010	Rent a Girlfriend for the New Year	租个女友回家过年	Sun Yiwei	
2010	Kill Traitor	锄奸	Li Biao	
2010	Puberty hit Menopause	青春期撞上更年期	Deng Jiaqi	
2010	The Legend of Incorruptible Stone	廉石传奇	Yuan Fei	Cameo
2011	All Men Are Brothers	水浒传	Ximen Qing	Guest appearance, ep. 23–28
2011	Fight and Love with a Terracotta Warrior	古今大战秦俑情	Meng Tianfang/Lan Tian/Luo Kaiping	
2011		大汉口	Lu Xiuwu	
2012	My Economical Man	我的经济适用男	Feng Zhihao	
2012	Beijing Youth	北京青年	He Bei	
2012		雪狼谷	Zhao Sihai	
2012	Palace II	宫锁珠帘	Prince Guo	
2012	Allure Snow	倾城雪	Xu Hen	
2013	Heroes in Sui and Tang Dynasties	隋唐演义	Li Shimin	
2013	Puberty hit Menopause 2	青春期撞上更年期2	Deng Jiaqi	
2013	Hello 30	30岁你好	Tong Youyi	
2013	Fall in Love	恋爱的那点事儿	Lin Zefeng	
2013	Longmen Express	龙门镖局	Zhang Wenjin	Cameo
2013	Little Daddy	小爸爸	Wei Ni	Cameo
2014		天网·行踪	Gao Shen	Cameo
2014	Cosmetology High	美人制造	Xue Shao	Cameo
2014	God of War	战神	Ma Zheng	Cameo
2014	Beautiful Trap	美丽背后	Lin Yiwei	also producer
2014	The Young Doctor	青年医生	Feng Lei	Cameo
2015	Ice and Fire of Youth	冰与火的青春	Luo Hao	
2015	Love Yunge from the Desert	大汉情缘之云中歌	Meng Jue	
2015	The Dream Come True	美梦成真	CEO Du	Cameo
2015	Pretty Wife	老婆大人是80后	Lu Bufan	
2016	Women Must be Stronger	女不强大天不容	Lv Fangcheng	
2016	Love the Courier	功夫之爱的速递	Xiong Dan	
2016	Happy Mitan	欢喜密探	Emperor Shunzhi	Cameo
2017	Mature Male Develop a Mind	熟男养成记	Fei Zhongjie	
2017	Peacekeeping Infantry Battalion	维和步兵营	Lin Haonan	
2017	Tribes and Empires: Storm of Prophecy	海上牧云记	Lu Ranqing	Cameo
2019	Last One Standing	无主之城	Luo Ran	
2019	Guns and Roses	黄金大劫案	Xiao Sanjiang	
2019	Unknown Number	时空来电	Cao Zheng	
2020	Winter Begonia	鬓边不是海棠红	Yuan Xiaoqiu	
TBA	To Love	最初的相遇，最后的别离	Zhao Yanhui	
TBA	Love is True	我是真的爱你	Mo Ming	
TBA	Gentlemen Attention Please	先生们，请立正	Guo Chong	
TBA	Guardians of the Dafeng	大奉打更人	Zhenbei (Lord of Northern Border)	

== Discography ==
=== Soundtrack appearances ===
Year	English title	Chinese title	Album
2008	"Dilemma"	两难	Enemy Camp for 18 Years OST
2009	"Innocence"	纯真	Nanny and Security Guard OST
2012	"In Support of the Love"	爱的供养	Palace II OST
2012	"Live On"	活着	Beijing Youth OST
2015	"The Sky Outside"	云天外	Love Yunge from the Desert OST

== Awards and nominations ==
Year	Award	Category	Nominated work	Result	Ref.
2010	3rd Huading Awards	Best New Actor	—N/a	Won	
2011	China Student Television Festival	Most Popular Actor	—N/a	Won	
2017	Macau International Movie Festival	Best Supporting Actor	The Wasted Times	Nominated	
2019	6th The Actors of China Awards	Best Actor (Web series)	The Last One Standing	Nominated	
