= Running Man (2015 film) =

- Film poster
- 奔跑吧！兄弟
- Directed by: Hu Jia; Cen Junyi
- Written by: Cen Junyi; Li Yatao
- Produced by: Jun Wang; Li Yaping
- Music by: Roc Chen
- Production companies: Zhejiang Blue Star International Media Co., Ltd; Huayi Brothers Media Group Co., Ltd; Wanda Media Co., LTD
- Distributed by: Wanda Media Co., LTD; Wuzhou Film Distribution Co., Ltd; Huayi Brothers Media Group Co., Ltd
- Release date: 30 January 2015 (China)
- Running time: 88 minutes
- Country: China
- Language: Mandarin
- Box office: US$70 million

Running Man (Chinese: 奔跑吧！兄弟) is a Chinese reality comedy film directed by Hu Jia and Cen Junyi released on 30 January 2015. It is a film adaptation of Zhejiang Television series Running Man China, itself a spin-off based on the South Korean variety TV show of the same name.

== Cast ==
- Angelababy (Yang Ying)
- Jerry (Li Chen)
- Michael Chen He
- Ryan Zheng Kai
- Wong Cho-lam
- Wang Baoqiang
- Guo Jingfei
- Evonne Hsieh
- Lynn Hung
- Yi Yi

== Box office ==
As of 22 February 2015, Running Man has grossed around US$70 million in China.

The film topped the box office during its opening weekend in China earning US$31.86 million from 155,940 screenings and 7.28 million admissions ahead of Hollywood blockbuster, The Hobbit: The Battle of the Five Armies, which was in its second weekend run. It remained at the summit in its second weekend earning $24.49 million.
