= Song in the Clouds =

2015 novel by Tong Hua

- Book cover
- Author: Tong Hua
- Original title: 雲中歌
- Language: Chinese
- Subject: Ancient China
- Genre: Romance, historical fiction,
- Publisher: Writers Publishing House
- Publication date: 2015
- Publication place: China

Yun Zhongge
- Simplified Chinese: 云中歌
- Traditional Chinese: 雲中歌
- Literal meaning: Song in the Clouds
Transcriptions
Standard Mandarin
- Hanyu Pinyin: Yún Zhōnggē

Song in the Clouds, also known as Yun Zhongge (Chinese: 雲中歌), is a novel by Tong Hua. It was published in 2007 by Writers Publishing House (作家出版社). It is a sequel to Ballad of the Desert.

== Plot ==
During the Western Han dynasty, Huo Yunge (daughter of Huo Qubing and Jin Yu from Ballad of the Desert) saved the eight-year-old Emperor Zhao of Han from the cold of the desert. Ten years later, Huo is a beautiful young woman who could not forget that boy and went to Chang An city to fulfil their 10 years ago promise. She mistook another Liu Bing Yi as Emperor Liu Fu Ling as both of them had a similar jade given by the late emperor and helplessly watched him marry Xu Pingjun.

== Themes ==
Song in the Clouds is a historical romance novel set in the final years of Emperor Wu of Han. For the novel, Tong Hua draws upon her encounters with friendship, love, faith, growth, and commitment. She sets the story against a historical context and to enriches the characters by layering in feelings of patriotic resentment and family conflict. Tong Hua uses adaptation to supplementing missing historical records.
