= Four Dan actresses =

Four bankable young actresses of mainland China

The Four Dan actresses (Chinese: 四旦 or 四大名旦 or 四小名旦 or 四大花旦 or 四小花旦) are the four most bankable actresses in Mainland China. Guangzhou Daily first used the term to reference Zhang Ziyi, Zhao Wei, Zhou Xun, and Xu Jinglei in July 2000, when they were all in their 20s. It gained widespread use in China following a series of interviews with them by Southern Metropolis Daily from December 2001 to January 2002. The media have made repeated efforts to elect the "New Four Dan actresses" thereafter, but the acceptance and recognition of these new lists have not matched that of the original Four Dan actresses.

Originally, a dan was a male actor who portrayed a leading female character in Peking opera. The term "Four Dan" was coined in the 1920s to refer to four popular dan actors: Mei Lanfang, Cheng Yanqiu, Shang Xiaoyun, and Xun Huisheng.

== The Four Dan actresses ==
- Xu Jinglei (b. 1974), graduate of the Beijing Film Academy, gained fame through A Sentimental Story (1997 TV series) and Cherish Our Love Forever (1998 TV series)
- Zhou Xun (b. 1974), graduate of the Zhejiang Art School, gained fame through Palace of Desire (2000 TV series) and Suzhou River (2000 film)
- Zhao Wei (b. 1976), graduate of the Beijing Film Academy, gained fame through My Fair Princess (1998–1999 TV series)
- Zhang Ziyi (b. 1979), graduate of the Central Academy of Drama, gained fame through The Road Home (1999 film) and Crouching Tiger, Hidden Dragon (2000 film)

Li Bingbing (b. 1973), graduate of the Shanghai Theatre Academy, and Fan Bingbing (b. 1981), graduate of the Shanghai Xie Jin-Hengtong Star School, gained fame soon after the quartet in the early 2000s. They were sometimes mentioned together as "Four Dan and Two Bing" (四旦双冰). Shu Qi (b. 1976), a Taiwan-born actress who gained fame in the late 1990s, and Tang Wei (b. 1979), graduate of the Central Academy of Drama who gained fame through Lust, Caution (2007), were sometimes mentioned together as "Four Dan Two Bing One Shu One Tang" (四旦双冰一舒一汤).

== New Four Dan actresses and '85 flowers ==
From 2005, the media have made repeated efforts to elect "New Four Dan actresses" (新四小花旦).

2009 version by Tencent:

- Huang Shengyi (b. 1983), graduate of the Beijing Film Academy, gained fame through Kung Fu Hustle (2004 film) and Fairy Couple (2007 TV series)
- Wang Luodan (b. 1984), graduate of the Beijing Film Academy, gained fame through Struggle (2007 TV series) and My Youthfulness (2009 TV series)
- Yang Mi (b. 1986), graduate of the Beijing Film Academy, gained fame through The Return of the Condor Heroes (2006 TV series) and Chinese Paladin 3 (2009 TV series)
- Liu Yifei (b. 1987), graduate of the Beijing Film Academy, gained fame through The Story of a Noble Family (2003 TV series) and Demi-Gods and Semi-Devils (2003 TV series)

2013 version by Southern Metropolis Entertainment Weekly:

- Yang Mi (b. 1986), graduate of the Beijing Film Academy, gained fame through Palace (2011 TV series)
- Liu Shishi (b. 1987), graduate of the Beijing Dance Academy, gained fame through Scarlet Heart (2011 TV series)
- Ni Ni (b. 1988), graduate of the Communication University of China, Nanjing, gained fame through The Flowers of War (2011 film)
- Angelababy (b. 1989), gained fame through modeling and Love in Space (2011 film)

The four actresses from the 2013 version were all born after 1985. Along with Liu Yifei and two other actresses who were born around 1985 — Tiffany Tang (b. 1983), graduate of the Central Academy of Drama, and Zhao Liying (b. 1987)—they are now usually known together as the '85 flowers (85花).

== New Four Dan actresses of the "post-'90s" generation ==
In August 2016, Southern Metropolis Daily conducted a survey among 173 million netizens and 110 professional media and industry insiders. After a series of voting, four actresses who were born after 1990 (90后四小花旦) were picked.

- Zheng Shuang (b. 1991), graduate of the Beijing Film Academy, gained fame through Meteor Shower (2009 TV series)
- Zhou Dongyu (b. 1992), graduate of the Beijing Film Academy, gained fame through Under the Hawthorn Tree (2010 film)
- Yang Zi (b. 1992), graduate of the Beijing Film Academy, gained fame through Home with Kids (2004 sitcom) and Battle of Changsha (2014 TV series)
- Guan Xiaotong (b. 1997), graduate of the Beijing Film Academy, gained fame through The Left Ear (2015 film) and To Be a Better Man (2016 TV series)

== New Four Dan actresses of the "post-'95s" generation ==
Since 2018, the media have made efforts to elect "New Four Dan actresses" among those were born after 1995 (95后四小花旦).

2018 version by Sohu Entertainment:

- Zhang Zifeng (b. 2001), graduate of the Beijing Film Academy, gained fame through Aftershock (2010 film) and Go Brother! (2018 film)
- Vicky Chen (b. 2003), graduate of the Central Academy of Drama, gained fame through Angels Wear White (2017 film) and The Bold, the Corrupt, and the Beautiful (2017 film)
- Guan Xiaotong (b. 1997), graduate of the Beijing Film Academy, gained fame through The Left Ear (2015 film) and To Be a Better Man (2016 TV series)
- Ouyang Nana (b. 2000), graduate of the Berklee College of Music, gained fame through Beijing Love Story (2014 film)

2019 version by CCTV-6:

- Zhang Zifeng (b. 2001), graduate of the Beijing Film Academy, gained fame through Aftershock (2010 film) and Go Brother! (2018 film)
- Vicky Chen (b. 2003), graduate of the Central Academy of Drama, gained fame through Angels Wear White (2017 film) and The Bold, the Corrupt, and the Beautiful (2017 film)
- Guan Xiaotong (b. 1997), graduate of the Beijing Film Academy, gained fame through The Left Ear (2015 film) and To Be a Better Man (2016 TV series)
- Zhang Xueying (b. 1997), graduate of the Central Academy of Drama, gained fame through Einstein and Einstein (2013 film)

2022 version by Sina Entertainment:

- Zhao Lusi (b. 1998), graduate of the MingDao University, gained fame through Untouchable Lovers (2018 TV series) and Love Like the Galaxy (2022 TV series)
- Esther Yu (b. 1995), graduate of the Lasalle College of the Arts, gained fame through Youth With You 2 (2018 talent show) and Love Between Fairy and Devil (2022 TV series)
- Song Zu'er (b. 1998), graduate of the Beijing Film Academy, gained fame through Divas Hit the Road 3 (2017 reality show) and The Bond (2021 TV series)
- Guan Xiaotong (b. 1997), graduate of the Beijing Film Academy, gained fame through The Left Ear (2015 film) and To Be a Better Man (2016 TV series)

== Similar titles ==
The Chinese media have made similar efforts to elect the "Four Sheng actors" (四大小生), but the acceptance and recognition of these lists have not matched that of the Four Dan actresses. The most popular version of the "Four Sheng actors" includes Chen Kun, Deng Chao, Liu Ye, and Huang Xiaoming, who are now known in China as the "Four Middle(-aged) Sheng actors" (四大中生).

In addition, in the early 1990s, Hong Kong's most popular male stars were collectively referred to as the "Four Heavenly Kings" (Andy Lau, Jacky Cheung, Aaron Kwok and Leon Lai). Later, Taiwan also introduced four male idols labelled "Four Younger Heavenly Kings" (Alec Su, Nicky Wu, Jimmy Lin and Takeshi Kaneshiro).
