= List of All Is Well episodes =

This is a summary of the first 25 episodes of the 46-episode drama series All Is Well. Jian Chuanhe directed the series and stars Yao Chen, Ni Dahong, Guo Jingfei, Li Nian, Tony Yang, Gao Xin, and Gao Lu. The series premiered on March 1, 2019, on Zhejiang Television and Jiangsu Television.

== Episodes ==
No.	Title	Original release date
1	"Episode 1"	March 1, 2019
In San Francisco, Su Mingzhe is about to meet his boss when he receives a phone call from his family that his mother has died. Although his company is laying off employees and he is burdened with mortgages, he insists on returning home to deal with his mother's funeral affairs. Su Mingyu comes to pick up her elder brother, Mingzhe, at the airport, but she continually shifts her focus to her work, and Mingzhe becomes upset with her. The three children of the Su family gather at Mingcheng's house to accompany their father, where Mingyu shows indifference to her sister-in-law, Zhu Li. Su Daqiang (father) hints to his children that he wants to live in America with his elder son, Su Mingzhe. Mingyu takes her father back to the old house to collect things. As she walks in the alleyway, she remembers her childhood.
2	"Episode 2"	March 1, 2019
Mingyu finds that her parents' savings are less than 50,000 yuan. Su Daqiang tells Mingyu that the money was given to Mingcheng by her mother, who spent it to maintain his lifestyle. Mingyu takes her father shopping, and he feels very happy. At dinner, Su Daqiang tells Mingyu that he kept a record of every penny Mingcheng received from his mother. Mingyu receives a phone call from her secretary at her mother's funeral to learn that the meeting with the president of Hongshi Group, which was supposed to be rescheduled, has not been rescheduled. President Meng calls to ask her why she is absent from the meeting with the client. Mingcheng sees that Mingyu is absent-minded at her mother's funeral and becomes enraged. They quarrel, and Mingyu drives off before her mother's funeral ceremony even starts.
3	"Episode 3"	March 2, 2019
After witnessing a quarrel between his younger brother and sister, Mingzhe asks Su Daqiang about it. Su Daqiang confides in him: In a flashback to the time in which Mingyu attended Normal College, Su Daqiang asked Mingyu to come home and attend a dinner with Mingcheng's fiancée. Su Daqiang revealed that to buy a house for the soon-to-be married Mingcheng, her mother had sold a room at their house. This was the second room that the mother had sold; the first was to pay for Mingzhe's expenses for attending Stanford University. Mingyu ran home and quarreled fiercely with her mother. Among other things, Mingyu would have to move her bed to a common area. Furious that her mother had spent so much money supporting her brothers and so little on her, Mingyu decided to leave and never live at home again. She studied, worked hard, and lived frugally. Handing out fliers on the street to earn money, she met President Meng, the boss of Zhongcheng Group. He took a liking to her and employed her in his company. The flashback ends. Mingzhe prepares to return to the United States. Mingcheng is puzzled after catching his father and elder brother hiding passbooks. Three days later, Mingyu returns to her company to see Liu Qing, the general manager of the Jiangbei sales branch of the Zhongcheng Group, waiting for her in her office. He asks if she is going to jump to the rival company, Liujin Group. She says that rumors about this are nonsense. When Mingyu sees President Meng, she does not explain to him that she was absent from a meeting with a client because she had to attend her mother's funeral. President Meng tells Mingyu that the matter is over.
4	"Episode 4"	March 3, 2019
Su Daqiang moves to his second son's house for the time being. Mingzhe returns to the United States and tells his wife Wu Fei that he wants to bring their father to live with them. Wu Fei says their father has an ear problem and can not fly. Wu Fei is upset after learning that their mother lied, claiming Mingcheng's father could not fly, because she didn't want to take care of her. Su Daqiang continues living in Mingcheng's house, which he sometimes messes up. Mingcheng tries to reason with his father, but Su Daqiang refuses to listen, saying that the younger couple dislikes him. Su Daqiang feels bad after eating his daughter-in-law Zhu Li's takeaway lunch. Su Daqiang invites some old leaders and friends to join him at home; they make a mess and fill the house with smoke. Zhu Li comes home shocked by the situation and is distraught.
5	"Episode 5"	March 4, 2019
President Meng asks Mingyu if the Liujin Group is poaching her. Mingyu assures him that she will not betray him and states that her partner, Liu Qing, will not switch jobs either. President Meng believes Vice Chairman Sun is conspiring with other companies to bring down the company. He tells Mingyu not to worry about the cooperation between Hongshi Group and Zhongcheng Group. When Mingcheng and Zhu Li come home at night, they find that Su Daqiang has brought a stray dog back. Zhu Li is afraid of dogs and panics. The couple cleaned the room which was dirtied by the dog. Liu Qing and Mingyu have dinner in a restaurant named "Shi Hun Zhe" (食荤者). He asks Mingyu about President Meng's attitude towards him. Liu Qing sees that Mingyu has a unique relationship with Shi Tiandong, the boss of "Shi Hun Zhe". Shi Tiandong is saddened to see Mingyu and Liu Qing together. Mingcheng and Zhu Li try to persuade Su Daqiang to take a bath but ultimately fail. Su Daqiang feels disliked by his son and his daughter-in-law. Zhu Li goes back to her mother's home in a rage after quarreling with her husband.
6	"Episode 6"	March 4, 2019
Mingcheng takes Su Daqiang to a steam sauna and gets Su Daqiang to bathe that way. Meanwhile, Mingyu reports to company leaders and promises to do better this month than last month. Mingcheng comes to his parents-in-law's home with a gift to apologize to Zhu Li and to take Zhu Li home. When the couple returns home, they find that Su Daqiang has diarrhea and has collapsed. They rush him to the hospital. The doctor tells them that the father is suffering from foodborne illness caused by eating a lot of duck necks. The frail Su Daqiang clamors to see his children. Mingzhe questions why Mingcheng hadn't been taking good care of their father. The two brothers quarrel on the phone. Mingzhe says that he would like to bring his father to the United States immediately. Wu Fei reminds Mingzhe that Mingzhe has recently lost his job, that their financial situation is not too good and he needs to find a new job. Given this, how can they take on the burden of supporting Mingzhe's father. Mingyu calls Shi Tiandong and asks him to deliver takeouts to Su Daqiang, and tells him not to tell Su Daqiang that she is the one arranging for this. In the morning, Mingcheng cooks porridge for Su Daqiang, but he is reluctant to eat it. Mingyu flies to Chengdu to see President Hong, who refuses to see her. Shi Tiandong comes to deliver takeout to Su Daqiang, saying that a lady invited him to deliver it. Su Daqiang thinks it is Zhu Li who ordered it for him.
7	"Episode 7"	March 5, 2019
Mingyu has been waiting at the front desk of Hongshi Group. She wants to rectify her missed appointment with him (she was at her mother's funeral at the time). President Hong finally agrees to meet her, and he takes her to a hot pot shop. To get him to accept her apology, Mingyu reluctantly eats spicy food and drinks herself into oblivion. However, President Hong doesn't accept her apology. Mingyu returns to the hotel and, drunk, ends up sleeping in the bathtub. The next morning, she is woken up by a phone call from President Meng, who orders her to hurry back. Mingyu is scolded by President Meng. Her trip to Chengdu has disrupted President Meng plans to re-establish business relations with the Hongshi Group and this will cost Zhongcheng Group dearly. Shi Tiandong comes to deliver takeout food to Su Daqiang. Shortly before, Su Daqiang had accidentally broke a door in Mingcheng's house. Shi Tiandong helps Su Daqiang repair it. Because they need certain tools to perform the repair, Su Daqiang goes out to buy them. When Mingcheng comes home, he mistakenly thinks that Shi Tiandong is a criminal; he also convinces Su Daqiang of this too. The father and son lock Shi Tiandong in the house and report him to the police. Liu Qing tells Mingyu that he thinks President Meng no longer believes in them. He thinks it is time to find a new company. Mingyu replies that he is overreacting. Mingyu receives a call from the police asking her to verify Shi Tiandong's identity. Mingyu goes to Mingcheng's house angrily and quarrels with the two for calling the police on Shi Tiandong and not taking proper care of Su Daqiang.
8	"Episode 8"	March 5, 2019
Mingcheng, along with his wife, and Mingyu blame each other for not taking good care of Su Daqiang. Mingyu asks her father to live with her, but he refuses. In the end, Mingcheng tells Mingyu to leave his house and never come back. Mingyu and Mingcheng have never gotten along. Mingcheng and his wife argue with Su Daqiang about Mingyu. Su Daqiang calls Mingzhe and begs to go to America. Su Daqiang excitedly tries on clothes at home and prepares to go to get the visa the next day. Mingyu comes to "Shi Hun Zhe" to apologize to Shi Tiandong about his arrest. Mingcheng successfully completes the visa processing for his father, and then calls Mingzhe to ask him to book an airline ticket for their father. After learning that Su Daqiang is coming to the United States, Wu Fei quarrels with Mingzhe because Mingzhe still has no job. At this time, their daughter, who is upstairs, bumps her head badly. The couple are frightened and rushes her to the hospital. The Mingchengs buy Su Daqiang some expensive clothes and arrange for a going-away party for him and some of his old friends in a big hotel room. Daqiang comes back from the party drunk. He makes a scene and passes out. Strangely, President Meng instructs Mingyu to put her current projects on hold and travel to America to represent Zhongcheng Group at a business conference. Su Daqiang is very excited to be going to America.
9	"Episode 9"	March 6, 2019
Su Daqiang is excited about going to the United States. Mingzhe calls Su Daqiang and tells him that he can't go for the time being. Mingcheng calls Mingzhe to ask why father can't go to the United States. Embarrassed about the situation, Mingzhe doesn't tell Mingcheng that he has recently lost his job and that his family is under financial stress. Su Daqiang is upset and starts behaving very badly at the Mingchengs' house. Mingzhe sends a message to Mingyu, asking her to take care of their father. Zhu Li proposes to hold a family meeting, and wants to include Mingyu in the discussion of what to do about Su Daqiang. The four people meet in the old house. Mingyu tells Mingcheng (and his wife Zhu Li) that their parents had made an agreement with her, which stated that Mingyu need not provide for them. Mingyu asks Su Daqiang to take out the accounts of the Su family which he had been recording for more than ten years. The accounts clearly shows that half of the savings of their parents had been given to Mingcheng in recent years. After reading the accounts, Zhu Li is ashamed. She says that she will support Su Daqiang from now on and she promises to find a way to return all the borrowed money to him.
10	"Episode 10"	March 6, 2019
Early the next morning, Su Daqiang pretends to pack his bags and says he is moving away. Zhu Li explains to Su Daqiang that the two decides to support him from now on, each month, each of them take out 2000 yuan from their wages as repayments. Su Daqiang, who has money, is addicted to buying lottery tickets and fantasizes that he can hit the jackpot. After arriving in the United States, Mingyu participates in a entrepreneurial exchange meeting, and exchanges feelings with Shi Tiandong in WeChat. In order to pay back his father, Mingcheng and Zhu Li work from dawn to dusk, but they are blamed by Su Daqiang for cooking too late. In a restaurant, Su Daqiang meets his old friend, Lao Nie, who says he is engaged in financial management. Su Daqiang feels very happy after Zhu Li returns all her bonuses to him, but Mingcheng worries it would be unsafe to leave too much cash in his father's hands. Mingyu calls Mingzhe and says she wants to see him and his family.
11	"Episode 11"	March 7, 2019
Mingcheng persuades his father to deposit the money in the bank, but he refuses. Accompanied by Lao Nie, Su Daqiang purchases the financial products of the "Haofu Licai" (豪富理财). Soon after, Su Daqiang is extremely pleased after seeing the benefits of financial products through his new mobile phone. Faced with Mingyu's visit, Mingzhe asks his wife, Wu Fei, not to tell Mingyu about his unemployment, and she agrees. Wu Fei, who meets Mingyu for the first time, is very impressed by Mingyu. Before leaving the United States, Mingyu invites Mingzhe's family to eat Chinese food. In the restaurant, they meet Mingzhe's former colleague who works as a waiter there, and he inadvertently exposes Mingzhe's unemployment. Mingzhe suddenly gets angry and leaves the restaurant with his child. Wu Fei tells Mingyu about their current situation, and Mingyu expresses her understanding.
12	"Episode 12"	March 7, 2019
At night. Wu Fei urges Mingzhe to apologize to Mingyu. Mingyu contacts her friend in San Francisco to offer Mingzhe a job. Mingcheng speculates that his father won a lottery and trails him to a lottery shop the next morning. Liu Qing calls Mingyu and tells her that the company has installed a supervisor and customers need Vice-President Sun's seal to pick up goods. Mingyu returns home early from the United States after she learned the news. Su Daqiang has tasted sweetness in financial management and intends to make additional investments. Mingzhe buys a gift for Wu Fei after signing the new job. Mingzhe persuades Wu Fei to return to China with him and their daughter, but she refuses. Mingyu calls Lao Meng, but it is his secretary who answers the phone. Su Daqiang brings Lao Nie to "Shi Hun Zhe" for dinner. Su Daqiang recommends the financial management he bought for Shi Tiandong when they left. Liu Qing drives Mingyu to the company to meet Lao Meng.
13	"Episode 13"	March 8, 2019
Shi Tiandong calls a friend in the financial circle and learns that the financial products invested by Su Daqiang are highly risky. Mingyu is in the underground garage attempting to take evidence of the collusion between Vice-President Sun and Lao Fan, who is a middle manager in Zhongcheng Group's rival, Liujin Group, and is interrupted by a call from Shi Tiandong. Shi Tiandong asks Su Daqiang to take him to the investment company and he agrees. Su Daqiang faints when he learns that he has been screwed in financial management. When Mingyu follows Vice-President Sun, Shi Tiandong dials Mingyu's phone and tells her that her father is in the hospital. Mingyu gives up tracking Vice-President Sun and turns to the hospital. At the hospital, Shi Tiandong tells Mingyu and the Mingcheng couple that their father had been defrauded of all his estate, more than 60,000 yuan, when buying the investment financial product. Su Daqiang pretends to jump from the hospital, and Mingyu calmly goes forward and analyzes the situation with Su Daqiang. Soon after, Mingyu and Mingcheng had a quarrel. At the "Shi Hun Zhe", Liu Qing leaves angrily after persuading Ming Yu to fail in job-hopping.
14	"Episode 14"	March 8, 2019
Shi Tiandong intends to send the drunken Mingyu to Mingcheng's house and calls Su Daqiang, but Mingcheng refuses. Mingyu gives her home address, and Shi Tiandong sends her home. The next morning, Mingyu feels extremely warm after seeing the broken octave house repaired by Shi Tiandong. Mingcheng opens the bedroom door and is frightened to the ground by his father, who has been waiting for it all night. Su Daqiang calls Mingyu and asks her to help recover the swindled money. Mingyu finds Lao Nie and says she will give her father 60,000 yuan and tells him that the police have broken the fraud case. Lao Nie agrees to help her lie well if Su Daqiang asks about the case's progress. Just as Mingyu is eating with her father, her assistant phones to say the company will dismiss Liu Qing from his post. In the meeting room, Liu Qing confronts President Sun and tries to attack him, but is interrupted by Mingyu, who has just arrived in a hurry. At night, Mingyu and Liu Qing write an official accusation to the company's management requiring for a change in the supervision system.
15	"Episode 15"	March 9, 2019
The family of Mingzhe packed their bags and returned to China. They ask the Su family to eat. Mingzhe states that he is the eldest child of the Su family, so he will substitute for his father to take charge of all the affairs in the Su family. Wu Fei could listen no longer, and she pinched her daughter to make her cry. After she leaves the table with the reason of pacifying her daughter, Mingyu chases out and comforts her. Mingzhe tries to reconcile Mingcheng and Mingyu, but they both fail to express their opinions. Mingyu receives the message from Liu Qing that Lao Meng has suddenly had a brain hemorrhage. She immediately rushes to the hospital. Mingyu regrets that she should not be confronted with her master at this time. Mingzhe proposes to buy a house for Su Daqiang to let him live and asks a nanny to take care of him, and says that the money to buy the house and hire the nanny will be paid by him and Wu Fei. Mingcheng is very happy, but Zhu Li feels that it is irresponsible for her to give no money.
16	"Episode 16"	March 10, 2019
Wu Fei finds that the original plan to sell the old house to buy the new house with two rooms and one living room, which they both agreed before, is completely overthrown by Su Mingzhe. Wu Fei’s heart is collapsed because Su Mingzhe shows off his wealth even if has no more. She argues with Mingzhe. Mrs. Meng meets Vice President Sun, and asks him to continue to manage the company. Su Mingcheng looks for the house for Su Daqiang, and Su Daqiang makes a lot of requests for the house. Zhu Li is dissatisfied with Ming Cheng's failure to confess his debt to the family with her elder brother, while Ming Cheng insists that he will not say that he owed money. Therefore, the couple quarrel.
17	"Episode 17"	March 10, 2019
Before Wu Fei returns to the United States, Mingzhe invites Mingyu to have dinner and tells her that he prepares to pay for their father’s house. Mingyu advises her eldest brother to consider carefully. When leaving, Mingyu tells Wu Fei to let the eldest brother to ask clearly about how did they discuss their father’s pension problem with Su Mingcheng when his father failed to go to the United States? Su Daqiang asks Mingzhe to take him to look the house that he is satisfied with, urging his son to pay the deposit quickly. Wu Fei takes the card from Su Mingzhe's wallet and moves to Mingyu's house. Mingyu asks Shi Tiandong to deliver food for Wu Fei and her children. Ming Yu advises Mingzhe not to sacrifice his wife and daughter’s life to flaunt his superiority.
18	"Episode 18"	March 11, 2019
Before Wu Fei returns to the United States, Mingzhe invites Mingyu to have dinner and tells her that he prepares to pay for their father’s house. Mingyu advises her eldest brother to consider carefully. When leaving, Mingyu tells Wu Fei to let the eldest brother to ask clearly about how did they discuss their father’s pension problem with Su Mingcheng when his father failed to go to the United States? Su Daqiang asks Mingzhe to take him to look the house that he is satisfied with, urging his son to pay the deposit quickly. Wu Fei takes the card from Su Mingzhe's wallet and moves to Mingyu's house. Mingyu asks Shi Tiandong to deliver food for Wu Fei and her children. Ming Yu advises Mingzhe not to sacrifice his wife and daughter’s life to flaunt his superiority.
19	"Episode 19"	March 11, 2019
Zhu Li is led by a leader into a large-scale audit project team and tells her that doing the job will help her promote, which makes Zhu Li excited. When the audit project team arrives at Zhongcheng Company, the middle-level alliance seems to be broken. However, Mingyu suddenly discovers that the person who in charge of the audit is Julie. Just as Zhu Li wants to read the audit process, Mingyu break into it. In order to save the crisis, Mingyu had no choice but to say that Julie is her own relative. To ensure fairness and objectivity, Zhu Li needs to leave the audit team and terminate the meeting. Mingyu’s words makes Zhu Li embarrassed, and the auditing firm’s strength is also questioned. Zhu Li did not know that Mingyu’s work in Zhongcheng, but she is overwhelmed by the leader and is suspended from the job. Mingyu sends a message to Zhu Li, explains why she has to do that, and says she will apologize to her someday. Zhu Li feels aggrieved.
20	"Episode 20"	March 12, 2019
Zhu Li, who is upset and sad, returns to her mother’s home. Ming Cheng comes over and learns that Mingyu broke Zhu Li’s project in public. Mingyu and Liu Qing want to cooperate to visit Lao Meng in the Hospital. Just when Mingyu wants to sneak through the nurses' desk, Su Mingcheng's phone is called in succession, and Mingyu hangs up. Su Mingcheng telephones again to question the situation during the day. Liu Qing helps Mingyu to answer the phone and is blamed by Su Mingcheng. Mingyu takes the phone and talks to Su Mingcheng very rudely, which even angers Mingcheng. Mingyu feels that she owes Zhu Li, and asks the master to help arrange the second job for her.
21	"Episode 21"	March 12, 2019
Mingyu drives home and is then beaten by Su Mingcheng in the garage. Wu Fei hearing the sound outside, goes out to see Mingyu lying on the ground with her blood. She quickly sends Mingyu to the hospital. Wu Fei calls Zhu Li to tell the incident. Zhu Li quickly rushes back from her mother’s home and is confronted by the police, who come to Mingcheng’s home to take Mingcheng away. The Su family is in a mess, but Su Daqiang only explains that Mingcheng and Mingyu have often fought since a young age. Zhu Li only cares about how to save Mingcheng, and no one cares about the injury of Mingyu. Wu Fei can not stand. Zhu Li’s parents come to Su Daqiang, hoping that he will rescue Mingcheng. However, they find that Su Daqiang is not responsible at all. Su Daqiang only cares about himself. He calls and asks Wu Fei to buy him a house so he can move out and live there. Wu Fei is speechless. Zhu Li goes to the hospital to see Mingyu and is prevented. Lao Meng hears that Mingyu is injured by her second brother and feels worried about her. He advises her to not go to court due to family affairs.
22	"Episode 22"	March 13, 2019
Ming Cheng is prosecuted and will be sentenced. Su Daqiang and Zhu Li force Ming Zhe to face this matter. Wu Fei does not want Ming Zhe to come back for the matter. Ming Zhe asks Wu Fei to take up the matter and communicate with Su Daqiang, which makes her mad. Wu Fei and Zhu Li both ask Su Daqiang to go to the hospital to find Ming Yu and ask her to let Mingcheng go. Zhu Li even threatened Su Daqiang with a statement to sever Su Daqiang and Ming Cheng’s father-son relationship. Su Daqiang, though reluctant, has to go to the hospital. Su Daqiang comes to the ward to visit Mingyu and comfort her. Mingyu is touched. However, Su Daqiang still pleaded for Mingcheng at the end. Mingyu is so angry that she falls off the fruit basket brought by Su Daqiang and laments that Su Daqiang is never a father of her. Mingyu says that Su Daqiang actually does not care about Mingcheng and her. He comes here just because he himself can no longer live in Mingcheng’s house. Before leaving, Su Daqiang notes that Mingyu and her mother are remarkably similar to each other.
23	"Episode 23"	March 13, 2019
Zhu Li once again went to the hospital to see Su Mingyu with her mother, but she is rejected. Zhu Li's mother repeatedly insisted, so Ming Yu finally let them come into the ward. They represent Mingcheng to apologize to Mingyu. Mingyu also apologizes to Zhu Li for her behavior at the audit meeting, but she does not intend to forgive Su Mingcheng. After Liu Qing consults a lawyer, he tells Ming Yu that Mingcheng has already committed the crime of injury. If she continues to pursue it, he will go to jail. Zhu Li’s mother tells Zhu Li’s father that Mingyu’s injury is very serious. He worries that Mingcheng’s violent tendency will hurt her daughter someday. Zhu Li doesn’t care. Wu Fei tells Shi Tiandong about the hospitalization of Mingyu. Shi Tiandong rushes to the hospital and sends Mingyu home, taking care of Mingyu's diet. At night, Mingzhe calls Mingyu to let off Mingcheng, which makes Mingyu resent. Shi Tiandong chooses to stand on Mingyu's side to take the legal route.
24	"Episode 24"	March 14, 2019
Zhu Li and her daughter return to Mingcheng’s family. Zhu Li’s mother asks Su Daqiang for Mingyu’s residence. However, Su Daqiang does not know. Zhu Li’s mother force him to contact Mingyu. Mingyu finally takes the call, and Su Daqiang reads the words written by Zhu Li and her mother to persuade Mingyu. Mingyu asks Shi Tiandong what he will choose to do, and Shi Tiandong only says to do what she wants to. Mingyu looks at this man who supports himself unconditionally, and she changes her mind. Mingyu informs Liu Qing to let the lawyer withdraw the lawsuit. As long as Mingcheng reflects on himself in public, she will not continue to pursue it. Mingyu calls Zhu Li and says that she can withdraw the lawsuit. Mingcheng’s letter of apology is very perfunctory. Mingyu gives him her own letter of apology to Mingcheng and lets him read it, videotaping it as evidence, which makes Mingcheng feel very humiliated.
25	"Episode 25"	March 14, 2019
The abnormal silence of Mingcheng finally breaks out in the face of everyone's persuasion. Mingcheng makes the parents of Julie leave, and asks his father whether Su Mingyu is his own daughter, saying that she is the most vicious woman in the world. At night, Mingyu wakes up in a nightmare. Shi Tiandong accompanies and comforts her. Mingcheng cannot sleep, making Zhu Li unbearable and terrified. Zhu Li let Ming Cheng promise to let the past pass and not mention Mingyu. Shi Tiandong finds Mingcheng and lets him not bully Mingyu. The two people fight. Su Daqiang does not understand why Shi Tiandong will do this, and Mingcheng tells him that Mingyu have recorded the video of his apology. Zhu Li is angry and calls Mingyu. She let her Mingyu delete the video, but Mingyu argued against it. Mingyu learns that Shi Tiandong has met Mingcheng for her. Lao Meng gives Su Mingyu a half-month leave to let her rest, and Shi Tiandong decides to take a trip with her. Su Daqiang calls Mingzhe and asks him to persuade Mingyu to delete the video. Ming Yu refuses.
