= Wen Zhang =

Chinese actor

- Born: 26 June 1984 (age 42); Xi'an, Shaanxi, China
- Education: Central Academy of Drama
- Occupations: Actor; Director
- Years active: 2006–present
- Agent: Easy Entertainment
- Spouse: Ma Yili (m. 2008; div. 2019)
- Children: 2 daughters

Chinese name
- Chinese: 文章
Transcriptions
Standard Mandarin
- Hanyu Pinyin: Wén Zhāng

Wen Zhang (Chinese: 文章, born 26 June 1984) is a Chinese actor. He graduated from the Central Academy of Drama in 2006. He is known for his roles in television series Struggle (2007), Dwelling Narrowness (2009), and in films Ocean Heaven (2010), Love is Not Blind (2011), and Journey to the West: Conquering the Demons (2013).

Wen ranked 58th on Forbes China Celebrity 100 list in 2013, and 45th in 2014.

== Career ==
Wen gained recognition for his role in the TV drama Romantic Life. He had his breakthrough for his role in the TV drama Struggle (2007), adapted from the popular novel by Shi Kang, followed by another major hit show Dwelling Narrowness (2009).

Wen made his film debut in A Tale of Two Donkeys, directed by Li Dawei, a black comedy film set in the Down the Countryside Movement, for which Wen won the Best New Actor at the China Movie Channel Media Awards.

Wen had his first major screen role in Xue Xiaolu's art-house film, Ocean Heaven (2010), portraying a 21-year-old man on the autism spectrum whose greatest joy is swimming. Initially rejected for not meeting the production’s expectations, Wen trained intensively, mastering four swimming strokes within a week to secure the role. He subsequently underwent rigorous preparation, including daily 5,000-meter swim training and a six-month immersion living among individuals with autism, an experience he later said helped him better understand their inner world. His performance received widespread critical acclaim, earning him the Best Actor award at the China Movie Channel Media Awards. The same year, Wen won the Best Actor award at the Sichuan Television Festival and Audience's Choice for Actor at the Golden Eagle Awards for his role as a war-time hero in Snow Leopard.

In 2011, Wen starred in the romantic comedy Love is Not Blind alongside Bai Baihe. Produced on a modest budget, the film became a surprise commercial success, grossing over ¥350 million at the Chinese box office. Wen won the Best Actor award at the Hundred Flowers Awards for his performance. He also received the Best Actor award at the China TV Drama Awards for his role in Naked Wedding (2011).

In 2013, Wen starred as Tang Sanzang in Stephen Chow's fantasy blockbuster Journey to the West: Conquering the Demons, which broke box-office records to become the highest-grossing Chinese film at the time. He also starred in action comedy Badges of Fury alongside Jet Li. That year, Wen made his television directorial debut with Little Daddy, in which he also starred, winning Best Television Series and Best Actor awards at the LETV Awards.

Wen's career was significantly derailed by an extramarital affair in 2014. After a long break, Wen directed his first feature film, When Larry Met Mary (2016). Although the film received positive critical reviews, it underperformed commercially. Wen received the Best Directorial Debut award at the Golden Rooster Awards. Later that year, he returned to television with Young Marshal, a biographical drama of Zhang Xueliang.

However, following his comeback, Wen did not regain his previous level of popularity. Amid stricter censorship and morality campaigns in China, he was removed from the television drama Zhuang Tai (2020), which aired on CCTV-1, suggesting he had been blacklisted from television. Wen continued to work in theatre and appeared in minor or cameo roles in films.

== Personal life ==
Wen married Chinese actress Ma Yili in 2008; they have a daughter. They met on the set of a Chinese historical drama Embroidered Uniform Guard, and started dating when they filmed Struggle together. However, in 2014, Wen was exposed by the paparazzi to be involved in an affair with Yao Di, his co-star in the 2011 television series Naked Marriage. His affair attracted enormous attention on Sina Weibo, in part because of his image as a devoted husband; his apology became the most-reposted post on the platform at the time. On 28 July 2019, Wen and Ma announced their divorce.

On 8 November 2019, Wen confirmed a relationship with Ren Hanqing, a flight attendant 12 years his junior. In February 2020, the two were photographed visiting a maternity hospital, and in July Wen acknowledged that Ren was pregnant. Their son was born on 1 August 2020. In October 2020, Wen stated that he would not remarry, citing a desire to retain personal freedom.

== Filmography ==
=== Film ===
Year	English title	Chinese title	Role	Notes
2009	A Tale of Two Donkeys	走着瞧	Ma Jie	
2010	Ocean Heaven	海洋天堂	Da Fu	
2011	Mr. & Mrs. Incredible	神奇侠侣	Emperor	
2011	The Law of Attraction	万有引力	Gao Yuan	
2011	The Sorcerer and the White Snake	白蛇传说	Neng Ren	
2011	Love is Not Blind	失恋33天	Wang Xiaojian	
2012	In-Laws New Year	亲家过年	Zhang Xuelun	
2012	Truth or Dare	真心话大冒险		Cameo
2012	All for Love	三个未婚妈妈		Cameo
2012	The Guillotines	血滴子	Qian Long	
2013	Beyond the Bounds	越位者		Cameo
2013	Journey to the West: Conquering the Demons	西游·降魔篇	Tang Sanzang	
2013	Badges of Fury	不二神探	Wang Bu'er	
2014	On the Way	我在路上最爱你	Xia Yu	
2014	Gone with the Bullets	一步之遥	Wu Qi	
2016	The Mermaid	美人鱼	Policeman	Cameo
2016	League of Gods	封神传奇	Nezha	
2016	When Larry Met Mary	陆垚知马俐		Director
2017	Gong Shou Dao	功守道		Director
2018	Fat Buddies	胖子行动队		
2019	God of Practice	遇神		

=== Television series ===
Year	English title	Chinese title	Role	Notes
2000	Bloom of Youth	青春正点	Chen Long	
2001	Black Triangle	黑三角	Du Liang	
2003		拯救少年犯	Cao Xiaolei	
2004	You Are Smiling, While I am Weeping	你在微笑我却哭了	Chen Chen	
2006	Song of Youth	青春之歌	Lin Daofeng	
2006	Romantic Life	与青春有关的日子	Zhuo Yue	
2006	Embroidered Uniform Guard	锦衣卫	Zhu Tianjiao	
2007		暗流	Duan Yifei	
2007	Struggle	奋斗	Xiang Nan	
2007	Where is Happiness	幸福在哪里		Cameo
2008	Brothers	兄弟门	Hua Xiaowen	
2009	Prominent Family	望族	Du Qingming	
2009	Love in Sun Moon Lake	爱在日月潭	Meng Ting	
2009	Dwelling Narrowness	蜗居	Xiao Bei	
2010	Snow Leopard	雪豹	Zhou Weiguo	
2010	National Anthem	国歌	Nie Er	
2010		冰是睡着的水	Coach Gao	
2011	Naked Wedding	裸婚时代	Liu Yiyang	
2011		再过把瘾		Cameo
2011	Black Fox	黑狐	Luo Bin	
2013	Blood Rose 3	血色玫瑰之女子特遣队	Wang Jingwei	
2013	Little Daddy	小爸爸	Yu Guo	Also director
2013	Love is not Blind	失恋33天		Cameo
2016	Young Marshal	少帅	Zhang Xueliang	
2016	Happy Mitan	欢喜密探		Cameo
2017	Razor	剃刀边缘	Xu Congliang	Also director
2020	Raiders of the New Way	一步登天	Na Lan	
2020	Snow Leopard 2	雪豹2	Zhou Weiguo	

== Awards and nominations ==
Year	Award	Category	Nominated work	Result	Ref.
2009	China Movie Channel Media Awards	Best New Actor	A Tale of Two Donkeys	Won	
2010	China Movie Channel Media Awards	Best Actor	Ocean Heaven	Won	
2011	Beijing College Student Film Festival	Best Actor	Ocean Heaven	Nominated	
2011	Beijing College Student Film Festival	Most Popular Actor	Ocean Heaven	Won	
2011	Huabiao Film Awards	Best Newcomer	Ocean Heaven	Won	
2011	Golden Phoenix Awards	Society Award	Ocean Heaven	Won	
2011	China TV Drama Awards	Best Actor	Naked Wedding	Won	
2011	Shanghai Television Festival	Best Actor	Snow Leopard	Nominated	
2012	Golden Eagle Awards	Audience's Choice for Actor	Snow Leopard	Won	
2012	Golden Eagle Awards	Most Popular Actor	Snow Leopard	Won	
2012	Shanghai Television Festival	Best Actor	Naked Wedding	Nominated	
2012	China Film Director's Guild Awards	Best Actor	Love is Not Blind	Nominated	
2012	Beijing College Student Film Festival	Best Actor	Love is Not Blind	Nominated	
2012	Beijing College Student Film Festival	Most Popular Actor	Love is Not Blind	Won	
2012	Hundred Flowers Award	Best Actor	Love is Not Blind	Won	
2013	Sichuan Television Festival	Best Actor	Snow Leopard	Won	
2013	LeTV Awards	Best Director (TV)	Little Daddy	Won	
2013	LeTV Awards	Best Actor (TV)	Little Daddy	Won	
2013	China TV Drama Awards	Best Director	Little Daddy	Won	
2016	Asian New Talent Award	Best Director	When Larry Met Mary	Nominated	
2017	31st Golden Rooster Awards	Best Directorial Debut	When Larry Met Mary	Won	
