= Wang Luodan =

Chinese actress and singer

- 王珞丹
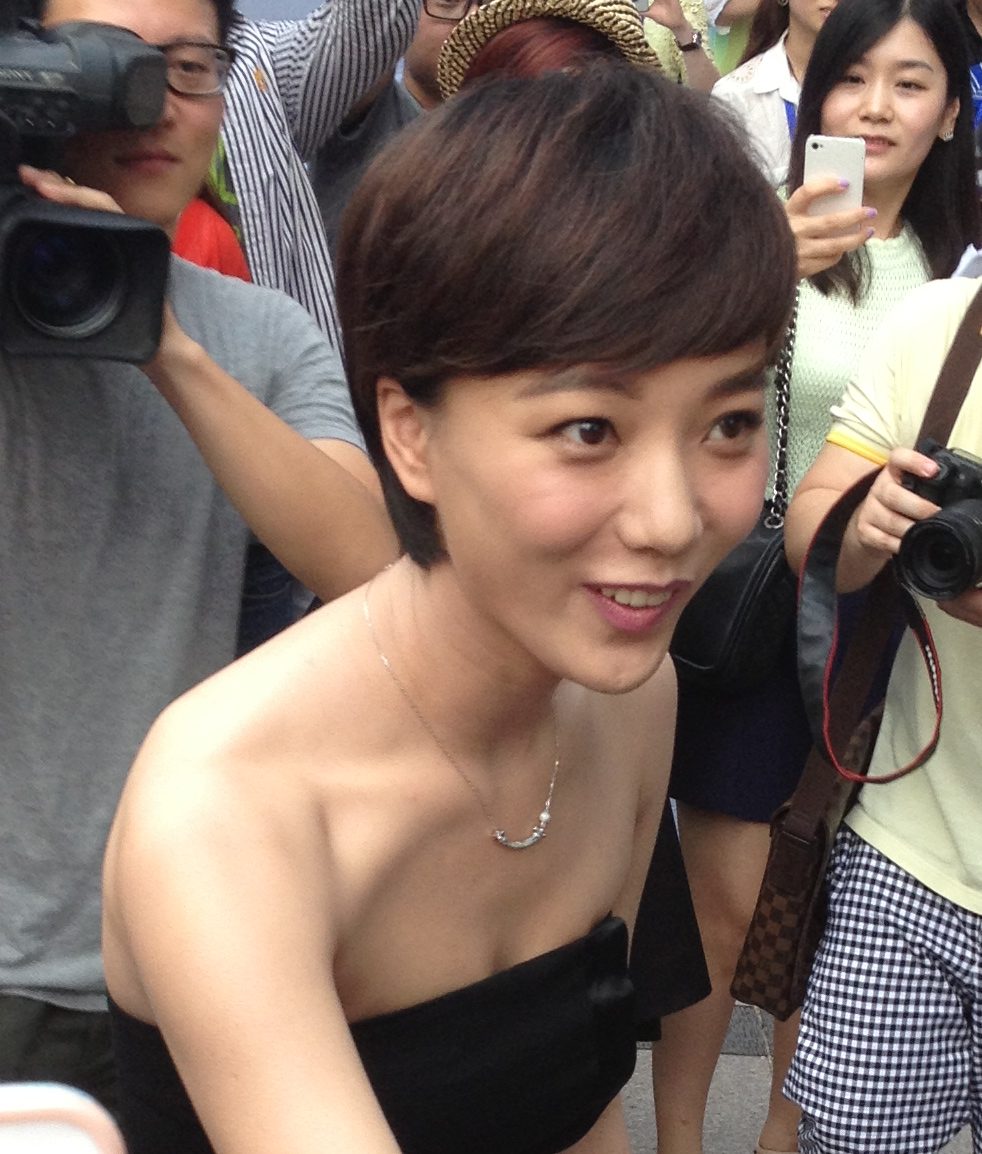
- Wang in 2013
- Born: January 30, 1984 (age 42); Chifeng, Inner Mongolia, China
- Education: Beijing Film Academy
- Occupations: Actress; singer
- Years active: 2004–present
- Agent: SMI Corporation
- Partner: Zhang Jiajia

Chinese name
- Traditional Chinese: 王珞丹
- Simplified Chinese: 王珞丹
Transcriptions
Standard Mandarin
- Hanyu Pinyin: Wáng Luòdān
- Musical career
- Instruments: Piano, accordion, drums, guitar, electric guitar

Wang Luodan (Chinese: 王珞丹, born January 30, 1984) is a Chinese actress. She rose to fame with the TV series Struggle (2007), followed by TV series My Youthfulness (2009) and A Story of Lala's Promotion (2010). Her notable films include Driverless (2010), Caught in the Web (2012), for which she won the Golden Rooster Award for Best Supporting Actress, and The Dead End (2015).

Wang was named by Tencent as one of the "New Four Dan Actresses" in 2009. She ranked 74th on Forbes China Celebrity 100 list in 2014.

== Early life and education ==
Wang was born in Inner Mongolia, China. She graduated from Beijing Film Academy in 2005.

== Career ==
Wang rose to fame for her role in the highly popular youth drama, Struggle (2007), playing a girl from a wealthy family who is always optimistic in her never ending pursuit of love. She cemented her straightforward onscreen persona in My Youthfulness (2009), the second installment of Zhao Baogang's 'Youth' trilogy after Struggle.

After achieving success on the small screen, Wang ventured to films. She starred in the experimental indie film Twilight Dancing (2008) directed by Shu Ya.

Wang resumed her onscreen persona in the youth-oriented drama, Go La La Go! (2010) based on the novel of A Story of Lala's Promotion. The series attracted a large following among younger viewers and many of their middle-aged parents. The same year, Wang starred in the film Driverless. Opposite from her usual spunky roles, she plays a deaf-mute girl who is crazily in love with an amateur car racer and was praised by critics for her performance. Due to her popularity, she was named one of the new Four Dan Actresses by Tencent in 2009 and chosen as the Golden Eagle Goddess in 2010.

In 2012, Wang starred in the period war drama Detachment of Women, which broke her previous typecasting as a "pure and innocent maiden". The same year, she starred in Chen Kaige's social film Caught in the Web wherein she played an ambitious journalist. Her performance won her the Best Supporting Actress award at the 29th Golden Rooster Awards.

Wang then took a break from acting and work due to her hectic schedules, heading to New York University to further her studies for three months.

After she returned from her hiatus in 2014, Wang starred as the titular protagonist Wei Zifu in her first historical drama The Virtuous Queen of Han. She also starred in the biographic film Rise of the Legend and road film The Continent, where she plays a prostitute that services guests at a road hotel. That year, she was chosen as the Most Valuable Chinese Actress.

In 2015, Wang starred in the cycling film To the Fore by Dante Lam. The same year, she starred in crime drama film The Dead End by Cao Baoping. The film drew critical acclaim and Wang won Best Supporting Actress at the 13th Changchun Film Festival.

In 2017, Wang starred in the medical drama ER Doctor, directed by Zheng Xiaolong.

In 2019, Wang returned to the big screen with the anthology film Half the Sky.

== Filmography ==
=== Film ===
Year	English title	Chinese title	Role	Notes/Ref.
2006	Qi Yue	七月	Qing Qing	
2008	Alternative Ways	非常道	Xiao Xin	
2008	Twilight Dancing	车逝	Mei Mei	
2009	My Airhostess Roommate	恋爱前规则	Ran Jing	
2010	Driverless	无人驾驶	Li Xin	
2011	The Founding of a Party	建党伟业	Zhang Ruoming (Cameo)	
2012	Caught in the Web	搜索	Yang Jiaqi	
2012	Lethal Hostage	边境风云	Xiao An	
2012	The Guillotines	血滴子	Cameo	
2012	Legend of the Moles: The Treasure of Scylla	摩尔庄园2海妖宝藏		Voiced-dubbed
2013	Better and Better	越来越好之村晚	Zhou Yinan	
2013	Love You for Loving Me	我爱的是你爱我	Shen Xiaole	
2013	Exchange Life	鲜我奇缘		
2014	The Continent	后会无期	Su Mi	
2014	Rise of the Legend	黄飞鸿之英雄有梦	Ah Chun	
2015	To the Fore	破风	Huang Shiyao	
2015	Detective Gui	宅女侦探桂香	Gui Xiang	
2015	The Dead End	烈日灼心	Yi Guxia	
2015	The Cornfield	玉米人		
2016	The Secret	消失的爱人	Qiu Jie	
2016	My War	我的战争	Meng Sanxia	
2019	Half the Sky	半边天		
2019	Gone with the Light	被光抓走的人	Li Nan	
2021	The Curious Tale of Mr.Guo	不老奇事	Su Lingfang	

=== Television series ===
Year	English title	Chinese title	Role	Notes/Ref.
2004	Flying Butterfly	蝴蝶飞飞	Mai Lele	
2006	Sun Shining like Blossom	阳光像花一样绽放	Dan Juan	
2006	Keke Xili	可可·西里	Ding Wenjing	
2006	Mother is a River	母亲是条河	Lee Datao	
2007	Coming Home	烽火孤儿	Du Wei/Du Wei's mother	
2007	Struggle	奋斗	Mi Cai	
2008	An Earthshaking Seven Days	震撼世界的七日	Guan Xiaoxi	
2008	Volleyball Heroic Woman	排球女将	Li Xue	
2009	My Youthfulness	我的青春谁做主	Qian Xiaoxiang	
2009	Dark Fragrance	暗香	Wu Yue	
2010	A Story of Lala's Promotion	杜拉拉升职记	Du Lala	
2011	Men	男人帮	Mo Xiaomin	
2012	Detachment of Women	红娘子	Wang Xiaohong	
2012	Under the Hawthorn Tree	山楂树之恋	Jing Qiu	
2014	The Virtuous Queen of Han	卫子夫	Wei Zifu	
2015	Turned to Say Love You	转身说爱你	Li Mingyu	
2017	ER Doctor	急诊科医生	Jiang Xiaoqi	
2021	Crossroad Bistro	北辙南辕	You Shanshan	
2021	Gone Grandma	私奔的外婆	Huo Wei	
2021	New Generation: Takeoff	我们的新时代	Liu Mengyuan	
2022	Shanghai Dream	两个人的上海	Li Wen-jia	
2026	My Dearest Stranger	暗恋者的救赎	Yu Xiao	

== Discography ==
Year	English title	Chinese title	Album
2006	"Wear My Love" (with Will Pan)	戴上我的爱	Around the World
2008	"Believe There's One Day"	相信有一天	Volleyball Heroic Woman OST
2010	"I Thought"	我以为	A Story of Lala's Promotion OST
2010	"Driverless Love"	无人驾驶的爱情	Driverless OST

== Awards and nominations ==
Year	Award	Category	Nominated work	Result	Ref.
2008	7th China TV Golden Eagle Award	Audience's Choice For Actress	Struggle	Nominated	
2009	27th Flying Apsaras Awards	Outstanding Actress	Struggle	Nominated	
2010	16th Shanghai Television Festival	Best Actress	My Youthfulness	Nominated	
2010	16th Shanghai Television Festival	Most Popular Actress	My Youthfulness	Won	
2010	China TV Golden Eagle Award	Audience's Choice For Actress	My Youthfulness	Nominated	
2010	1st College Students' Television Festival	Most Popular Actress	My Youthfulness	Won	
2010	1st One Drama Presentation	Most Anticipated Theater Actress	—N/a	Won	
2011	17th Shanghai Television Festival	Best Actress	A Story of Lala's Promotion	Nominated	
2011	13th Golden Phoenix Awards	Newcomer Award	—N/a	Won	
2012	8th Huading Awards	Best Actress (Revolution-Era Drama)	Detachment of Women	Nominated	
2012	2012 New York Chinese Film Festival	Most Popular Asian Artist	—N/a	Won	
2013	29th Golden Rooster Awards	Best Supporting Actress	Caught in the Web	Won	
2015	15th Chinese Film Media Awards	Most Anticipated Actress	The Continent	Nominated	
2015	7th Macau International Movie Festival	Best Actress	To the Fore	Nominated	
2015	13th Sichuan Television Festival	Best Actress	The Virtuous Queen of Han	Nominated	
2016	19th Huading Awards	Best Actress (Contemporary Drama)	Turned to say Love You	Nominated	
2016	13th Changchun Film Festival	Best Supporting Actress	The Dead End	Won	
2016	8th Macau International Movie Festival	Best Actress	My War	Nominated	
2018	24th Huading Awards	Best Actress (Modern Drama)	ER Doctor	Nominated	
