= Gao Lu =

Chinese actress

- 高露
- Born: October 8, 1982 (age 43); Beijing, China
- Other names: Lu Lu (露露); Sister Chestnut (栗子姐)
- Education: Central Academy of Drama
- Occupation: Actress
- Years active: 1999-present
- Children: 2

Gao Lu (Chinese: 高露; pinyin: Gāo Lù; born 8 October 1982) is a Chinese actress best known for her roles in The Lady Iron Chef, Mature Male Develop a Mind, My Economical Man, and All Is Well.

== Early life and education ==
Gao was born in Beijing on October 8, 1982. She graduated from the Central Academy of Drama.

== Acting career ==
Gao made her television debut in Youth is Like a Dream (1999), playing the monitress.

In August 2004, she appeared in Seven Swordsmen, playing the servant girl of Li Xiaoran's character. It is based on the wuxia novel written by Liang Yusheng.

In April 2005, Gao participated in the wuxia television series There is the Weapon of the Tear Stain as the wife of Chang Yue's character.

Gao was cast as Wen Qaing in the historical television series My Bratty Princess, which is set to premiere on January 25, 2006. That same year, she played Jin Yan in Wang Shuo's television adaptation Bloom of Youth, costarring Tong Dawei, Bai Baihe, Chen Yufan and Wen Zhang.

In 2007, Gao played the female lead opposite Guo Jinglin in Where Have All The Flowers Gone, a television drama in memory of the 70th Anniversary of the victory of the Long March. That same year, she had a guest appearance in The Lady Iron Chef, directed by Wong Jing.

Gao played the female lead role in the romantic comedy television series My Economical Man (2012), alongside Tong Liya, Li Guangjie, Du Chun, Qi Wei and Qiao Renliang. She also had a lead role in the drama television series, Rules Before A Divorce.

In 2013, she took the lead role in New Age of Love, opposite Yao Di and Ren Zhong.

In 2014, Gao had a supporting role in Our Second Child, a drama television series starring Jiang Xin and Monica Mok. She also landed a guest starring role on Woman in a Family of Swordsman opposite actress Tong Liya.

Gao starred with Li Guangjie, Tong Liya, Zhao Ziqi and Gao Yalin in the comedy television series Kuba Qiaoma (2015).

In 2017, Gao appeared in Surgeons, a medical drama starring Jin Dong and Bai Baihe.

Gao played a supporting role as Lin Qinshuang in the historical television series The Story of Minglan, starring Zhao Liying, Zhu Yilong and Feng Shaofeng and directed by Zhang Kaizhou.

In 2019, she starred as Wu Fei, reuniting her with co-star Yao Chen, who played the female lead role, in the drama television series All Is Well, the series was one of the most watched ones in mainland China during its broadcast.

== Personal life ==
On October 27, 2011, Gao openly acknowledged for the first time that she was married and had children. On January 3, 2017, Gao Lu announced on Sina Weibo that she gave birth to a boy.

== Filmography ==
=== Film ===
Year	English title	Chinese title	Role	Notes
2007	Invulnerable	无懈可击	Fang Ying	
2007	The Lady Iron Chef	美女食神	Mei Li	
2008	The First Army Regulations	第一军规	Li Yin	
2011	One Step Away	幸福59厘米	Lu Lu	
2011	Pattern	大格局	Zhang Yufeng	
2012	Crazy	因爱疯狂	Guo Lu	
2013		告别囧途	Shen Man	Microfilm
2013		夏天的拉花		
2023	So Long For Love	再见李可乐	Teacher Wang	

=== Television ===
Year	English title	Chinese title	Role	Notes
1999	Youth is Like a Dream	如梦年华	Monitress	
2004		阳光丽人	Xin Zhe	
2005	Courtyard of Pei Family	裴家大院	Gao Yan	
2006	There is the Weapon of the Tear Stain	泪痕剑	Wu Wan	
2006	My Bratty Princess	刁蛮公主	Wen Qiang	
2006	Bloom of Youth	与青春有关的日子	Jin Yan	
2006	Seven Swordsmen	七剑下天山	Chun Tao	
2006	Phoenix from the Ashes	浴火凤凰	Yu Xiaoxia	
2007		五号特工组	Takeuchi Buko	
2007	Where Have All The Flowers Gone	那时花开	Xie Qinying	
2008		要案组雷霆出击	Leng Hanmei	
2008		暴雨梨花	Er Buhui	
2009		婚变	Zheng Yan	
2009	Nanny Mother	保姆妈妈	Tang Tang	
2010	Undercover 48 Days	卧底48天	Xiao Yu	
2011		家，N次方	Xue Zhili	
2011		深白·再婚进行时	Shen Xin	
2011	Golden Code	黄金密码	Wei Tianyi	
2012	My Economical Man	我的经济适用男	Du Meimei	
2012	My Legendary Wife	我的传奇老婆	Fang Yonghe	
2012	Rules Before A Divorce	离婚前规则	Zhao Yatong	
2013	New Age of Love	新恋爱时代	Wei Shanshan	
2014	Woman in a Family of Swordsman	刀客家族的女人	Lian Hua	Guest
2014	Do Not Compel Me To Marry	别逼我结婚	Huang Shangshang	
2014	Our Second Child	二胎	Zhang Yan	Guest
2014		兵变1929	Lin Yao	
2015		新人在旅途	Lin Cong'er	
2015	Mature Male Develop a Mind	熟男养成记	Tian Jiali	
2015	Kuba Qiaoma	酷爸俏妈	Fan Li	
2015	Mr. Goodman: A Story of Emotion Care	好男儿之情感护理	Qin Xiaodan	
2015	Love Contract	爱情合约	Shan Lan	
2015	Junior Parents	小爸妈	Jian Dan	
2015		且行且珍惜	Cheng Ziyue	
2016		老公们的私房钱	Zheng Tingting	
2017		复婚前规则	Yuan Shengnan	
2017	Surgeons	外科风云	Lin Huan	
2018	On the Road	梦想合伙人	Li Wei	
2018	The Story of Minglan	知否知否应是绿肥红瘦	Lin Qinshuang	
2019	Spy Hunter	天衣无缝	Lady Yu	
2019	All Is Well	都挺好	Wu Fei	
2019	Passionate Age	激情的岁月	Yang Jiarong	
2020	Perfect Partner	完美关系	Shu Qing	
2020	If There Is No Tomorrow	我是余欢水	Gao Hong	
2020	The Smell of Warmth	温暖的味道	Yue Lan	
2021	You Are My Glory	你是我的荣耀	Shen Jing	
2021	New Generation: Beautiful You	我们的新时代	Wen Jing	
2022	Dr. Tang	关于唐医生的一切	Ouyang Zhenyu	
2023	Her World	她的城	Li Yingnan	
2024	War of Faith	追风者	Su Cishu	
2024	Joy of Life 2	庆余年2	Mrs. Wang	
2024	The Silicon Wave	赤热	Jin Wen	
2024	Love's Rebellion	四海重明	Nan Rao	
2025	Six Sisters	六姊妹	He Jiawen	
TBA		淬火年代	Qian Hongying	
