= Li Nian =

Chinese actress

- 李念
- Born: May 30, 1985 (age 41); Jingshan County, Hubei, China
- Education: Shanghai Theatre Academy
- Occupation: Actress
- Years active: 2004 - present
- Agent: Huayi Brothers
- Notable work: Dwelling Narrowness
- Spouse: Lin Heping (m. 2011)
- Children: 2

Li Nian (Chinese: 李念; pinyin: Lǐ Niàn; born 30 May 1985) is a Chinese actress. Li's most notable role to date is as Guo Haizao, a college graduate who was nurtured by a successful man, on the television series Dwelling Narrowness.

== Biography ==
Li was born in Jingshan County, Hubei, on May 30, 1985. She graduated from Shanghai Theatre Academy.

In 2004, Li made her television debut in Unlimited Speed. That same year, she also had a supporting role in the historical comedy television series Jianghu Qiao Jiaren, which starred Christy Chung, Liang Guanhua, and Du Chun.

Li appeared in Jasmine Flower (2005), playing the daughter of Chen Daoming's character.

In 2006 Li made her film debut with a small role in Fearless, which stars Jet Li as Huo Yuanjia.

In 2008, Li was cast in the role for which she is best known, the character of Guo Haizao on the television Dwelling Narrowness.

Li appeared in You Xiaogang's historical television series The Legend of Yang Guifei (2009), as the mother of Yang Guifei, who was played by Yin Tao. That same year, she starred with Shen Xiaohai in the romantic drama Don't Lie to Me.

In 2010, she had key supporting role in the horror film Midnight Beating. It was directed by Zhang Jiabei and starring Hong Kong veteran actors Simon Yam and Francis Ng.

In 2011, two television dramas she headlined, Marriage Management and Xia Yan's Autumn. She starred as Luo Qingniao, reuniting her with co-star Zhu Yuchen, who played her husband Ye Xiaoyu, in the romantic television series Marriage Management. She co-starred with Yin Xiaotian, whom played her husband, in another romantic television series Xia Yan's Autumn. That same year, she had a supporting role in the film Love Is Not Blind, which was adapted from an online novel written by Bao Jingjing.

Li starred opposite Zheng Kai in Tricks of Love (2013), playing his wife Jia Dianna.

In 2019, Li was cast as Zhu Li in All Is Well, opposite Ni Dahong, Yao Chen and Guo Jingfei. For her performance in that series, Li was also nominated for a Best Supporting Actress award at the 25th Shanghai Television Festival.

== Personal life ==
In early December 2010, on the talk show Very Quiet Distance, Li Nian revealed that she had already been engaged in the United States. On the afternoon of July 13, 2011, Li Nian admitted on her sina weibo that she had registered for marriage in Hong Kong with Lin Heping (Chinese: 林和平), a partner of Softbank Saifu. Their daughter Jessica was born on January 25, 2012. On March 14, 2015, she gave birth to a second child, nicknamed Wangzai (Chinese: 旺仔).

== Filmography ==
=== Film ===
Year	English title	Chinese title	Role	Notes
2006	Fearless	霍元甲	Jin Yu	
2009	Six Sisters in the War	沂蒙六姐妹	Yue Fen	
2010	Midnight Beating	午夜心跳	Wen Miao	
2011	Love Is Not Blind	失恋三十三天	Shan Shan	
2011	House Mania	房不剩防	Xiao Ke	
2019	Headlines			

=== Television ===
Year	English title	Chinese title	Role	Notes
2004	Unlimited Speed	极速的浪漫青春	Yang Jia	
2004		江湖俏佳人	Xue Er	
2005	Jasmine Flower	茉莉花	Gu Jiahui	
2006	City of Memory	记忆之城	Luo Yuting	
2006	Wind and Rain in Jinyuan City	风雨晋原城	Ying Er	
2006		换子成龙	Sun Ruyun	
2007	Under Sky Desire	天空下的愿望	Xiao Ru	
2009	Dwelling Narrowness	蜗居	Guo Haizao	
2010	The Legend of Yang Guifei	杨贵妃秘史	Yuenu	
2010	Don't Lie to Me	别对我说谎	Cai Chunlei	
2011	Marriage Management	经营婚姻	Luo Qingniao	
2011	Xia Yan's Autumn	夏妍的秋天	Xia Yan	
2012	Beijing Love Story	北京爱情故事	Guest	
2013	Tricks of Love	爱的秘笈	Jia Dianna	
2013		春天的绞刑架	Han Yulian	
2013		纸婚	Gu Xiaoying	
2019	All Is Well	都很好	Zhu Li	
2020	Love is True	我是真的爱你		
