= Zhu Yuchen =

Chinese actor

- Born: February 27, 1979 (age 47); Shanghai, China
- Education: Central Academy of Drama
- Occupation: Actor
- Years active: 1994–present

Zhu Yuchen (Chinese: 朱雨辰; pinyin: Zhū Yǔchén; born February 27, 1979) is a Chinese film actor.

He knew Tang Wei in 1995 and started dating since 1997 when both were students at a vocational school in Hangzhou, Zhejiang. They moved to Beijing together when Zhu was admitted to the Central Academy of Drama in 1998, but split up in 2000, shortly before Tang was admitted to the Central Academy of Drama on her fourth attempt.

== Filmography ==
=== Television series ===
Year	English title	Chinese title	Role	Notes
1994	Masterpiece Clothing	盛世华衣	Fashion designer's son	
2000	Mama's Spring	妈咪的春天	Xiao Wen	
2001	The Food King	食王传奇	Shun Zhi	
2001	Flame of Youth	青春火焰	Lu Yuchen	
2001	Lv Bu Wei - The Hero In Times Disorder	吕不韦传奇	Fan Ju	
2002	Love Until the End	爱到尽头	Gao Xiaojun	
2004	Flying Butterfly	蝴蝶飞飞	Lu Xin	
2005	The Vinegar Tribe	醋溜族	A Fei	
2006	Addressed to the Heart	徽娘宛心	Wu Huijun	
2006	Vagabond Vigilante	游剑江湖	Zhu Tengxiao	
2007	Struggle	奋斗	Hua Zi	
2007	After five years of marriage	婚后五年	Chen Weide	
2008	We have nowhere to place youth	我们无处安放的青春	Ge Jun	
2008	The So-called Marriage	所谓婚姻	Zhang Wenge	
2008	Memoirs in China	中国往事	Cao Guanghan	
2008		贫嘴小8之东丽湖恋曲	Xiao Cong	
2009	My Youthfulness	我的青春谁做主	Fang Yu	
2009	Get Married and Start Self's Career	成家立业	Xu Zhijiang	
2010		疯狂的骗局	Shang Yong	
2010		爱要有你才完美	Chen Chao	
2010	The Lying Lover	说谎的爱人	Qu Lixin	
2010	The Romance of Jianghu	江湖绝恋	Yue Ji	
2011	Family, Power N	家，N次方	Chu Mei	
2012	Management Marriage	经营婚姻	Ye Xiaoyu	
2012	Young Couple Times	双核时代	Xu Hang	
2012	Red Dawn	红色黎明	He Yunfeng	
2012	Cool Storm	冷风暴	Shen Linfeng	
2012	I Am Legend	我是传奇	Qiu Zhengyuan	
2012		文家的秘密	Chou Fei	
2014	Do Not Compel Me to Marry	别逼我结婚	Dong Haifeng	
2014		下班抓紧谈恋爱	Xu Yue	
2014		别叫我兄弟	Tong Haitao	
2014	Love Jurassic	奶爸的爱情生活	Huang Yuanshuai	
2014	Dating Hunter	约会专家	Pu Xia	
2015	Anti-terrorism Special Forces I	神鹰反恐特战队	Yang Can	
2016	128 Incident	铁血淞沪	Zhang Shixun	
2016	The Chaser	追击者	Chang Pingan	
2016	I Am The Red Army	我是红军	Nie Jiu	
2017		复婚前规则	Li Zhongyuan	
2018	Entering a New Era	风再起时	Kang Ning	

=== Film ===
Year	English title	Chinese title	Role	Notes
2004	One Million Yuan	一百万	Gun Zi	
2004	Yellow Ribbon	黄丝带	Lu Tu	
2005	Thirteenth Month	十三月	Xiao Yu	
2007	The Game Sports	大厨小兵	Zhang Eryong	
2008	Deadly Delicious	双食记	Luo Yi	
2009	Whats The Big Deal	多大事啊	Wang Junbo	
2010	Love in Cosmo	摇摆de婚约	Zhang Junhao	
2010	Four Nights of Strange Tales	四夜奇谭	Zhang Lei	Short film
2011	The Missing Villages	消失的村庄	Lu Shan	
2011	Love You You	夏日乐悠悠	Chi Chang	
2012	Lacuna	醉后一夜	Lv Shan	
2015	Blind Spot	探灵档案	Tommy	
2015	Chinese Horror Story	灵臆事件	Zhang Ling	
2016	The Bodyguard	我的特工爷爷	Pu Jingsheng	
2016	Change A Life-style	换个活法	Zeng Yong	
