= Driverless (film) =

- Film poster
- Traditional Chinese: 無人駕駛
- Simplified Chinese: 无人驾驶
- Hanyu Pinyin: Wu Ren Jiashi
- Directed by: Zhang Yang
- Written by: Zhang Chong; Huo Xin
- Produced by: Han Sanping; Wang Biaoxia; Qin Hong
- Starring: Liu Ye; Ruby Lin; Gao Yuanyuan; Li Xiaoran; Wang Luodan; Chen Jianbin
- Cinematography: Cao Yu; Zhao Fei
- Edited by: Yang Hong Yu; Xu Hong Yu
- Music by: Zhang Yadong
- Production companies: China Film Group; Stella Mega Film
- Distributed by: China Film Group; Sohu.com Inc; Phoenix Television; Easternlight Films; Beijing M&Y Center Media
- Release date: 2 July 2010 (China)
- Running time: 105 minutes
- Country: China
- Language: Mandarin

Driverless is a 2010 Chinese romance film directed by Zhang Yang and starring Liu Ye, Ruby Lin, Gao Yuanyuan, Li Xiaoran, Chen Jianbin and Wang Luodan. Director Zhang Yang says that this movie is an updated version of his 1997 film Spicy Love Soup, and it presents love stories set in our current "material era".

It is composed of three separate stories in modern society. The complicated relationships of the main characters in each story present "not beautiful but real life."

== Plot ==
Driverless is about three love stories that are intertwined by a car accident.

It deals with several relationship issues: the seven year itch, reuniting with a first love, one night stands, May–December romances, and extramarital affairs.

The director hoped to present love stories set in our current "materialistic era", and force audiences to consider what the standard is to measure love. "Should we be loyal to money, material things or our own hearts?"

== Storyline ==
Beijing, the present day. Struggling entrepreneur Zhixiong (Liu Ye) meets his first love Xiao Yun (Gao Yuanyuan) after a gap of 10 years when both are rival bidders for a contract; they have a one-night stand, and Zhixiong considers divorcing his wife Changqing (Li Xiaoran), but Xiao Yun is also in another relationship. Lonely deaf-mute teenager Li Xin (May Wang) spies on a womanising car racer, Lijia (Huang Xuan), and then starts spending time with him; each sees in the other something lacking in their own life.

Chauffeur Wang Yao (Chen Jianbin), who needs a large amount of money to pay for his wife's injuries in a car crash, meets wealthy businesswoman Wang Dan (Ruby Lin) by chance; she helps restore his self-confidence and invites him to invest in some shares which have been hotly tipped by another friend, Guo (You Yong), who saved her from suicide after a failed relationship. Over the course of time, these people's lives intersect and hidden connections are revealed.

== Cast ==
- Liu Ye as Zhi Xiong
- Li Xiaoran as Qi Zi (Zhi Xiong's wife)
- Gao Yuanyuan Zhi Xiong's ex-girlfriend
- Chen Jianbin as Wang Yao
- Ruby Lin as Wang Dan
- Wang Luodan as Li Xin
- Huang Xuan as Li Jia
- You Yong as Guo
- Hu Yihu as Dawei
- Zhang Yan as Wang Yao's wife
- Chang Kuo-chu as Li's father
- Wang Ziwen as Zifeiyu, internet writer
- Zhang Ran as girl in Lijia's car
- Chen Ping as Auntie Liu
- Huo Qidi as Changqing's father
- Xie Laijun as Changqing's mother
- Hou Yiyi as Zhixiong's son
- Lin Xinyang as Wang Yao's daughter
- Yang Kexin as landlord
- Zhao Yong as car racers
- Li Haibin as policeman

== Featured songs ==
- 无人驾驶的爱情 (Wu Ren Jiashi De Aiching – Love of Driverless) sung by Wang Luodan

== Reception ==
- "All of the cast get at least one big moment to internalise, and each of them carries it off. Ruby Lin is especially wonderful. Also worth mentioning is Li Xiaoran as Liu Ye's estranged wife, following her husband's infidelity with mounting despair"—twitchfilm.com
- "Comparisons to Zhang's debut, 'Love Spicy Soup', make 'Driverless' taste like chicken broth, with the former's plucky characters and piquant humor watered down to more comforting melodrama for a local commercial audience. The cast delivers controlled and genuine performances that are a welcome break from the crass overacting that populates China's commercial screens." -- The Hollywood Reporter

== See also ==
- Spicy Love Soup
