= Dwelling Narrowness =

Chinese television series

- Based on: Snail House by Liu Liu
- Starring: Hai Qing; Hao Ping; Cao Cuifen; Li Nian; Wen Zhang; Zhang Jiayi; Ma Guanying; Vivian Wu
- Country of origin: China
- Original language: Chinese
- No. of seasons: 1

Original release
- Release: 2009 – present

Dwelling Narrowness (Chinese: 蜗居; pinyin: Wōjū), also known literally as Snail House, is a 2009 television series broadcast in Mainland China, based on a 2007 novel of the same name by Liu Liu. It depicts two sisters struggling with life in Jiangzhou, a fictional city that strongly resembles present-day Shanghai. The Chinese name is a figure of speech meaning "humble abode".

Because a prominent storyline portrays the difficulties of buying an affordable home in the city, the show has become a symbol of the perceived ongoing real estate bubble in China, generating controversy in the Chinese press and attracting attention from foreign media sources.

Although 35 episodes of the series were produced, only 33 episodes were aired due to censors. The show was also criticized by some officials for its "sex, dirty jokes, and corruption stories", saying that the show had a "serious negative influence" on Chinese society. The series is seen as a running commentary on contemporary social issues in urban China, including the widening wealth gap, real estate prices, political corruption, the breakdown of traditional Chinese family values, foreigners' views of China and Chinese views of foreigners.

== Plot ==
Guo Haiping is the elder of two sisters, who moves to the fictional city of Jiangzhou to attend a prestigious college there. She and her husband Su Chun remain in the city after graduation, living in a very shabby shikumen in order to save money to buy a house. Haiping then convinces her mother to let Guo Haizao, her younger sister, come to Jiangzhou for college as well.

Four years pass and the couple still cannot afford the down payment on a house, since property prices have been skyrocketing. After Haizao graduates from college and cannot find a job, Haiping lets her sister live with her and Su Chun in their already very cramped room. Haizao eventually finds a job and meets Xiao Bei, a warm-hearted white collar office worker whom she starts dating.

Haizao's boss, a real estate developer, asks her to attend a business dinner where she entertains Song Si Ming, an influential government official who has business dealings with her boss. Song is middle-aged and attracted to Haizao's youth and beauty. He later makes several attempts to win her heart, despite the fact that he is married with a daughter and Haizao already has a boyfriend.

Song takes Haizao out on trips and gives money to her so that she can help her sister, Haiping, pay for the down payment on her house. With Song's help, Haiping finally buys a house that she likes. In return for helping her sister, Haizao begins an affair with Song and tries to hide this from her boyfriend. However, he eventually discovers the affair, and, although he initially forgives Haizao, they eventually break up.

Out of desperation, Haizao returns to Song. Meanwhile, Song and his superior, the mayor of Jiangzhou, have been involved in brokering real estate deals with local businessmen and taking large bribes. When he finds out he is under investigation and may be arrested and jailed, Song gives Haizao (who is now pregnant with his child) a large amount of money and leaves.

Song's wife later finds out about the missing money and goes to Haizao's place to demand it back. Haizao refuses and Song's wife becomes outraged, beating Haizao and causing her to have a miscarriage. Haizao is then hospitalized and loses both the child and her uterus, which prevents her from ever bearing a child again.

Song hears about Haizao's condition on the eve of being arrested for corruption and rushes to the hospital. However, he is chased by the police who think he is making an attempt to flee. On the way to the hospital, Song dies in a car accident. Haizao learns about Song's death and does not talk for three months due to depression, leaving for the United States at the end. Her sister, Haiping, starts a Chinese language school and lives with her husband and daughter at their new house.

== Cast ==
- Hai Qing as Guo Haiping
- Hao Ping as Su Chun
- Cao Cuifen as Guo Haiping's mother
- Li Nian as Guo Haizao, Guo Haiping's younger sister
- Wen Zhang as Xiao Bei
- Zhang Jiayi as Song Si Ming
- Ma Guanying as the mayor of Jiangzhou and Song Si Ming's superior
- Vivian Wu as Song Si Ming's wife
- Wu Yufang as Xu Li
