= New Generation (TV series) =

2021 Chinese TV series

- Official Poster
- Genre: Contemporary Report Drama; Slice of Life; Romance; Youth
- Directed by: Liu Haibo; Lu Xing; Lu Ying; Xu Jizhou; Zhang Ting; Wu Bai
- Starring: Tan Songyun; Bai Jingting; Janice Wu; Zhang Yunlong; Shawn Dou; Xi Meijuan; Deng Jiajia; Gao Lu; Li Gengxi; Li Xuejian; Wang Luodan; Yuan Wenkang; Tong Dawei; Chen He; Yu Haoming; Wang Zixuan; Wei Qing; Sa Rina; Liu Mintao; Wang Xiaochen
- Ending theme: "As Dreams Awaken" by Mao Buyi
- Country of origin: China
- Original language: Chinese
- No. of episodes: 48

Production
- Executive producers: Xiangxiang Times Entertainment Culture Media (Beijing) Co. Ltd; Huace Films (Tianjin) Co. Ltd; Shanghai Keton Culture Media Co. Ltd; Zhejiang Dongyang Giant Film and Television Culture Co. Ltd
- Producers: Shanghai Yuanjihua Culture Co. Ltd; Shanghai Caitoufeng Films
- Running time: 45 minutes

Original release
- Network: Beijing TV; Dragon TV; Tencent; iQIYI; Youku
- Release: 16 June – 18 July 2021

New Generation (Chinese: 我们的新时代) is a 2021 Chinese television drama produced to commemorate the 100th anniversary of the establishment of China. It is an anthology series consisting of six standalone stories, each comprising eight episodes: Beautiful You, Takeoff, Bomb Disposal Expert, Happiness Method, Because I Have A Home and Emergency Rescue. It was listed in the 32nd Huading Awards "Top 100 Chinese TV Drama Satisfaction Survey".

On 16 July 2021, it was released on Beijing Radio and Television Station, Dragon Television, Tencent Video, iQIYI, and Youku. Professionals from China's entertainment industry collaborated on the project, reflecting the nation's history and the commitment of frontline workers.

== Synopsis ==
The series offers a vivid portrayal of contemporary life, showcasing young frontline members from diverse backgrounds, including community volunteers, technical experts, bomb disposal specialists, village doctors, student officials, and civilian rescue team members. These characters confront real-life challenges, from tackling local farming issues to contributing to vital national industries. It reflects the evolving spirit of modern China and brings a fresh perspective to main-theme storytelling.

== Six distinct stories ==
- Beautiful You: Two female Party members, veteran He Jie (Liu Mintao) and young Bai Jing (Wang Xiaochen), volunteer in their community, discovering fulfillment while contributing to society. They inspire the younger generation to uphold dedication and compassion.
- Takeoff: Master craftsman Zhao Xudong (Li Xuejian) exemplifies unwavering dedication and demands excellence in the aviation industry. Liu Mengyuan (Wang Luodan), his determined apprentice, rises from intern to assembly team leader, ensuring the successful test flight of a domestic aircraft.
- Bomb Disposal Expert: Liu Xishi (Shawn Dou), a Chinese EOD (Explosive Ordnance Disposal) soldier, rises from a struggling rookie to a skilled team leader in a unit that risks their lives daily to defuse old mines and safeguard the public.
- Happiness Method: Liu Shilan (Janice Wu) becomes an ER doctor to care for her mother with Alzheimer, later dedicating herself to rural healthcare in Guizhou. She declines a prestigious city job to become a second-generation village doctor, where she confronts Secretary Hai Yang (Zhang Yunlong).
- Because I Have A Home: Huang Siqi (Tan Songyun), a dedicated village official, teams up with former internet celebrity Zhuang Xiaodong (Bai Jingting), who returns to his hometown, to motivate local farmers to adopt e-commerce and boost the village's agricultural economy.
- Emergency Rescue: After an earthquake strikes the city, rescue teams and doctors work tirelessly to save those trapped under the debris. As panic spreads, the crisis deepens with power outages and heavy rain, revealing the reality of human behavior.

== Casts ==
=== Story 1: Beautiful You: Episodes 1-8 ===
- Director: Liu Haibo

Cast	Character	Notes
Liu Mintao	He Fenfang	Neighborhood committee mediators and community volunteer
Wang Xiaochen	Bai Jing	White collar workers and community volunteer
Gao Lu	Wen Jing	Supporting casts
Li Gengxi	He Miaoyun	Supporting casts
Tian Xiaojie	Yu Haiyang	Supporting casts
Hao Ping	Secretary Lu	Supporting casts
Yu Tian	Lin Jin	Supporting casts

=== Story 2: Takeoff: Episodes 9-16 ===
- Director: Xu Jizhou.

Cast	Character	Notes
Li Xuejian	Zhao Xudong	Sheet Metal Worker
Wang Luodan	Liu Mengyuan	Zhao Xudong's apprentice, later becomes the assembly team leader
Yuan Wenkang	Pang Yibing	Pilot
Sha Jingchang	Ding Shaoliang	

=== Story 3: Bomb Disposal Expert: Episodes 17-24 ===
- Director: Zhang Ting

Cast	Character	Notes
Shawn Dou	Liu Xishi	Bomb disposal soldier
Xi Meijuan	Liu Xishi's mother	Widow of an engineer martyr
Deng Jiajia	Bai Yan	Liu Xishi's girlfriend
Zhou Fang	Liu Di	

=== Story 4: Happiness Method: Episodes 25-32 ===
- Director: Lu Ying.

Cast	Character	Notes
Janice Wu	Liu Shilan	Gaoyao Village Doctor
Sa Rina	Yang Huini	Liu's mother and Gaoyao Village doctor
Zhang Yunlong	Hai Yang	College student village official
Sun Jian	Zhang Zhenning	
Yu Entai		Liu's father

=== Story 5: Because I Have A Home: Episodes 33-40 ===
- Director: Lu Xing.

Cast	Character	Notes
Tan Songyun	Huang Siqi	College student and village official in Yunchuan Village
Bai Jingting	Zhuang Xiaodong	Former internet celebrity
Wei Qing	Grandma Zhuang Xiaodong	Supporting casts
Fan Shiqi	Huang Tunan	Supporting casts
Wang Yuanke	Gu Peifeng	Supporting casts
Zhou Chengao	Sun Haitian	Supporting casts

=== Story 6: Emergency Rescue: Episodes 41-48 ===
- Director: Wu Bai

Cast	Character	Notes
Tong Dawei	Cao Chong	Blue Whale Rescue Team Member
Chen He	Zhao Xiaofei	Blue Whale Rescue Team Member
Yu Haoming	Liu Feng	Captain of the Blue Whale Rescue Team
Wang Zixuan	Mumu	Main medical team of the Blue Whale Rescue Team
Chunyu Shanshan	Wang Chengguo	Blue Whale Rescue Team Member

== Soundtracks ==
Title	Singer	Notes
As Dreams Awaken	Mao Buyi	Ending Theme Song
Ordinary You	Jin Minqi	Beautiful You: Theme
Left Hand Right Hand	Wang Zhengliang	Takeoff: Theme
Return the Green Mountains to the Green Mountains	Zhang Lei	Bomb Disposal Expert: Theme
Happiness	Jing Xinyan	Happiness Method: Theme
Born at the Right Time	Wang Xi	Because I Have A Home: Theme
Retrograde Light	Duo Liang	Emergency Rescue: Theme

== Reception ==
The series received widespread acclaim from both critics and audiences for its compelling storytelling, and insightful portrayal of social themes and generational responsibilities.

- Bomb Disposal Expert: Shawn Dou's compelling portrayal of a courageous soldier facing extreme danger captivated viewer
- Have a Home: Tan Songyun and Bai Jingting redefined conventional drama styles with authentic and nuanced performances. Their genuine acting exceeded expectations and left a notable impression that resonated with audiences.

== Accolades ==
Year	Award	Category	Work	Status	Ref.
2021	32nd Huading Awards	Top 100 Chinese TV Series in Satisfaction Survey	New Generation	Listed	
