= Shi Kang =

Shi Kang (石康) is a modern Chinese writer born in 1968 in Beijing. His novel "晃晃悠悠" (Loafing Around) received critical acclaim in China and was turned into a play in 2005. His novel, "奋斗" (Struggle), was adapted into the 2007 TV show Struggle. He co-wrote Big Shot's Funeral in 2002.

He graduated with a degree in computer science from National Southwestern Associated University and earned a graduate degree in economics.

His novels have not yet been translated into English.

== Works ==
- "支离破碎" (Torn to Pieces)
- "晃晃悠悠" (Loafing Around)
- "一塌糊涂" (Completely Muddled)
- "在一起"
- "心碎你好"
- "北京姑娘"
- "鸡一嘴鸭一嘴"
- "激情与迷茫"
- "过山车""
- "口吐莲花"
