= Midnight Beating =

- Traditional Chinese: 午夜心跳
- Simplified Chinese: 午夜心跳
- Hanyu Pinyin: Wǔ Yè Xīn Tiào
- Jyutping: Ng1 Je6 Sam1 Tiu3
- Directed by: Zhang Jiabei
- Screenplay by: Zhao Ben
- Story by: Yu Chuanling
- Produced by: Lee Shui Hap; Ding Weimin
- Starring: Simon Yam; Francis Ng; Yang Yuyu; Li Nian; Yao Di
- Cinematography: Nakazawa Mayasuki
- Music by: Yasuda Fumio
- Production companies: Beijing Dadu Sunshine Film & TV Production; Sichuan Tenglong Film Company
- Distributed by: China Film Group Corporation; China Film Group Digital Film Distribution; Fujian Hengye Film
- Release date: 24 December 2010
- Country: China
- Language: Mandarin

Midnight Beating is a 2010 Chinese horror film directed by Zhang Jiabei and starring Hong Kong veteran actors Simon Yam and Francis Ng.

== Plot ==
In the Haibei People's Hospital, Qinghai province, China, the present day on the night of a full moon, a patient is murdered by a syringe through her chest. This adds stress to the hospital's heart surgeon Gu Zhensheng who had recently lost his wife Xia Xue (Liu Yuxin) to an illness. Since his wife's death, Gu has been suffering from nightmares that has affected his work, and Xia Xue's younger sister, Nurse Xia Xiaoyu (Yang Yuyu) also is emotionally disturbed.

The Hospital's director Wen Miao (Li Nian) is due for an operation for a weak heart. She's the fiancée of Mai Xiangyu (Francis Ng) the hospital's psychologist. Nurse Wu can't forgive Mai for breaking up with her and threatens to show his fiancée old photos of them having sex. One night, Wu is murdered in the same way as the old female patient. Gu tells hospital director Wen that Mai has been acting strangely lately, and Mai also tells him the same thing about Gu.

== Cast ==
- Simon Yam as Gu Zhensheng
- Francis Ng as Mai Changyu
- Yang Yuyu as Xia Xiaoyu
- Yao Di as Wu Xinyiao
- Li Nian as Wen Miao
- Liu Yuxin as Xia Xue
- Ba Duo as Master Hong
- Yang Shuting as Lin Xiang
- Li Zhaomin as Hospital director Wen
- Zhang Feng as Liu Dahua
- Zhao Yi as Tao Zhenyu

== Release ==
Midnight Beating was released on December 24, 2010 in China. On its first week, Midnight Beating was the third highest-grossing film in China, being only beaten by If You Are the One 2 and Let the Bullets Fly. In total, the film grossed $4,731,045 in China.

== Reception ==
Derek Elley, writing for Film Business Asia gave the film a five out of ten rating, who noted that the film is an "Okay hospital horror boasts good technique but is let down by a weak script."
