= All Is Well (TV series) =

- All is Well poster
- Chinese: 都挺好
- Hanyu Pinyin: Dōu Tǐnghǎo
- Genre: Drama
- Based on: All Is Well by Ah Nai
- Written by: Wang Sanmao; Lei Zi
- Directed by: Jian Chuanhe
- Starring: Yao Chen; Ni Dahong; Guo Jingfei; Li Nian; Tony Yang; Gao Xin; Gao Lu
- Country of origin: China
- Original language: Mandarin
- No. of seasons: 1
- No. of episodes: 46

Production
- Executive producer: Hou Hongliang
- Production locations: Suzhou, Jiangsu, China; San Francisco, California, U.S
- Production company: Daylight Entertainment

Original release
- Network: Zhejiang Television; Jiangsu Television
- Release: March 1 – March 25, 2019

All Is Well (Chinese: 都挺好) is a Chinese television series that premiered on Zhejiang Television and Jiangsu Television on March 1, 2019. The series is directed by Jian Chuanhe, and stars Yao Chen, Ni Dahong, Guo Jingfei, Li Nian, Tony Yang, Gao Xin, and Gao Lu. It is an adaptation of Ah Nai's novel of the same name. The series depicts the conflicts and struggles of a white-collar worker and her family members.

== Synopsis ==
The Su family becomes chaotic with the sudden death of Mother Su (Zhao Meilan), revealing hidden secrets. The problem of caring for the non-assertive but selfish and stingy Father Su (Su Daqiang), disrupts the peaceful life of his children and their families. Finally rid of his wife's control, Su Daqiang makes constant and excessive demands on his children. Su Mingzhe, the eldest son, returns to China from the United States, determined to support the family. He is unable to bear the burden and becomes alienated from his wife and daughter. The second son, Su Mingcheng (a NEET), has no regrets. He expects to suddenly become rich, which leads to a failure of both his career and his family. The youngest daughter, Su Mingyu, is mistreated and neglected by her parents and has severed economic ties with her family since the age of 18, eventually becoming the richest person in the Su family as a director in the Zhongcheng Group. She has vowed to draw a line in her dealings with the family, but she is dragged into the quagmire of the Su family once more. Ultimately, the Su family overcame a series of crises, gradually becoming more mature, understanding, and empathetic toward one another—and, ultimately, happy.

== Cast ==
=== Main ===
- Yao Chen as Su Mingyu (苏明玉)
  - An Weiwei as young Su Mingyu

The only daughter of the Su family, a businesswoman who works as a director in Zhongcheng Financial Group. Due to the mistreatment from her mother, she could not attend her dream university, Tsinghua University, and chooses to abandon her home to work part-time in a supermarket before meeting President Meng and joining Zhongcheng Group.

- Ni Dahong as Su Daqiang (苏大强)

The father of the Su family. He does not have as much power as his wife, Zhao Meilan, and often neglects how she mistreats Mingyu when she was young and refuses to stand up for her. As he becomes older, he often seeks protection and care from his sons and daughters as he is not capable of living or making decisions by himself.

- Guo Jingfei as Su Mingcheng (苏明成)
  - Li Junting as young Su Mingcheng

The second son of the Su family. Due to receiving a lot of pampering from his mother, he grows up eventually becoming less educated, arrogant, and hot-tempered, and having conflicts with Mingyu.

- Li Nian as Zhu Li (朱丽), Su Mingcheng's wife. Living happily and peace with Mingcheng but facing difficulty with her father-in-law living their house over financial and investment until having irreconcilable differences with Mingcheng leading to divorce.
- Tony Yang as Shi Tiandong (石天冬)

The owner of a small restaurant, Su Mingyu's love interest.

- Gao Xin as Su Mingzhe (苏明哲)
  - Wang Cheng as young Su Mingzhe

The first son of Su family, an alumnus of Tsinghua University and Stanford University, married and living in San Francisco, California after his graduation from Stanford. He has high self-esteem and keen on face-saving, and is more caring to his family than Su Mingcheng. He also has a family with his wife, Wu Fei and daughter, Xiao Mi.

- Gao Lu as Wu Fei (吴非)

Su Mingzhe's wife who lives in the United States, Xiao Mi's mother.

=== Supporting ===
- Chen Jin as Zhao Meilan (赵美兰)

The Mother of the Su family, Su Daqiang's wife, who favours her sons over her daughter Su Mingyu. She feels discouraged and uncomfortable with her husband's financial incapability but due to her pregnancy of Mingyu, she could not leave her husband to go with another man to Shanghai. This led her to become hateful to Mingyu as she grew up. She, in the beginning, died from a heart attack of faint and excitement.

- Chang Chen-kuang as President Meng/Meng Zhiyuan (蒙总/蒙志远)

Su Mingyu's teacher and boss, president of the Zhongcheng Group. Xiao Meng's father.

- Wang Dong as Liu Qing (柳青)

A salesperson in the Zhongcheng Group. Su Mingyu's coworker.

- Peng Yuchang as Xiao Meng (小蒙)

President Meng's son who is a reckless playboy until he is educated by Mingyu.

- Kang Qunzhi as Zhu Li's mother.
- Hou Changrong as Zhu Li's father.
- Tian Li as Ying Shu
- Wang Zhengquan as Uncle

== Soundtrack ==
| No. | Title | Lyrics | Music | Singer(s) | Length |
|---|---|---|---|---|---|
| 1. | "Exhort (叮咛)" (Ending theme) | Lo Ta-yu, Huang Ting and Chen Hongyu | Lo Ta-yu | Mao Buyi | 3:40 |
| 2. | "Nobody Knows (谁也不知道)" (Interlude) | Yi Jiayang | Zhu Jingran | Wang Xiaomin | 4:19 |
| 3. | "The Heart Belongs to Someone (心有所栖)" (Interlude) | Shen Song | Yang Li | Sha Baoliang | 3:51 |
| 4. | "All Is Well (都挺好)" (Interlude) | Chen Xi | Dong Dongdong | Yu Tian | 3:26 |
| 5. | "Such As Love (如爱)" (Interlude) | Chen Xi | Dong Dongdong | Liu Xijun | 3:10 |
| 6. | "Just Think It Never Happened (就当从没发生过)" (Interlude) | Chen Xi | Dong Dongdong | Jian Hongyi | 4:13 |

== Production ==
The producers hired Ah Nai (author of the novels Ode to Joy and Like a Flowing River) to work on a script.

On October 11, 2017, actors Yao Chen and Ni Dahong were cast in lead roles for the series.

Principal photography began on January 17, 2018, and wrapped in May 2018.

Most of the series was shot on location in Suzhou, Jiangsu, China while Su Mingzhe's family life is filmed in San Francisco, California, U.S. The scenes of the Su family's old house were filmed in an alley of Tongdeli (同德里). The scenes set in "Shi Hun Zhe" (食荤者) were filmed in Han'eryuan teahouse (翰尔园)(55 Daru Lane, Pingjiang Historic District, Gusu District). The village of Mingyuewan (明月湾; 'Moon Bay') served as the setting of the tea-leaf picking scene.

== Reception ==
The show has a 7.8 out of 10 rating on Douban, and received mainly positive reviews. It has become a major trending topic on social media, with related hashtags being viewed hundreds of millions of times. Many people have praised the television series online for revealing problems and contradictions in real life, such as traditional Chinese families' preference for boys over girls (重男轻女), NEET (啃老族), and generational conflicts related to caring for the elderly (家庭养老).

== Ratings ==
| Air date | Jiangsu TV CSM55 City ratings | | | Zhejiang TV CSM55 City ratings | | |
| Air date | Ratings (%) | Audience share (%) | Rank | Ratings (%) | Audience share (%) | Rank |
|---|---|---|---|---|---|---|
| 2019.3.1 | 0.606 | 2.09 | 4 | 0.418 | 1.44 | 6 |
| 2019.3.2 | 0.599 | 2.14 | 4 | 0.434 | 1.54 | 6 |
| 2019.3.3 | 0.689 | 2.42 | 4 | 0.47 | 1.65 | 6 |
| 2019.3.4 | 0.745 | 2.67 | 4 | 0.486 | 1.75 | 5 |
| 2019.3.5 | 0.782 | 2.75 | 4 | 0.685 | 2.4 | 5 |
| 2019.3.6 | 0.811 | 2.89 | 4 | 0.706 | 2.52 | 5 |
| 2019.3.7 | 0.88 | 3.14 | 4 | 0.84 | 2.97 | 5 |
| 2019.3.8 | 0.893 | 3.21 | 5 | 0.909 | 3.26 | 3 |
| 2019.3.9 | 0.869 | 2.97 | 4 | 0.873 | 2.99 | 3 |
| 2019.3.10 | 0.939 | 3.27 | 5 | 1.125 | 3.91 | 3 |
| 2019.3.11 | 1.08 | 3.92 | 4 | 1.208 | 4.39 | 2 |
| 2019.3.12 | 1.258 | 4.54 | 3 | 1.292 | 4.67 | 2 |
| 2019.3.13 | 1.222 | 4.37 | 3 | 1.318 | 4.71 | 2 |
| 2019.3.14 | 1.263 | 4.57 | 2 | 1.231 | 4.48 | 3 |
| 2019.3.15 | 1.188 | 4.25 | 3 | 1.308 | 4.68 | 2 |
| 2019.3.16 | 1.124 | 4.18 | 2 | 1.015 | 3.8 | 4 |
| 2019.3.17 | 1.263 | 4.52 | 4 | 1.355 | 4.86 | 2 |
| 2019.3.18 | 1.383 | 5.13 | 2 | 1.184 | 4.39 | 4 |
| 2019.3.19 | 1.169 | 4.43 | 4 | 1.422 | 5.39 | 1 |
| 2019.3.20 | 1.464 | 5.4 | 2 | 1.518 | 5.59 | 1 |
| 2019.3.21 | 1.49 | 5.33 | 2 | 1.6 | 5.73 | 1 |
| 2019.3.22 | 1.549 | 5.44 | 2 | 1.896 | 6.66 | 1 |
| 2019.3.23 | 1.566 | 5.56 | 2 | 1.846 | 6.58 | 1 |
| 2019.3.24 | 1.867 | 6.55 | 2 | 2.138 | 7.5 | 1 |
| 2019.3.25 | 2.024 | 7.48 | 2 | 2.278 | 8.42 | 1 |

- Highest ratings are marked in red, lowest ratings are marked in blue

== Awards and nominations ==
| Award | Category | Nominated work | Result | Ref. |
|---|---|---|---|---|
| 25th Shanghai Television Festival | Best Television Series | | Nominated | |
| 25th Shanghai Television Festival | Best Director | Jian Chuanhe | Nominated | |
| 25th Shanghai Television Festival | Best Adapted Screenplay | Wang Sanmao, Lei Zi | Nominated | |
| 25th Shanghai Television Festival | Best Actor | Ni Dahong | Won | |
| 25th Shanghai Television Festival | Best Actress | Yao Chen | Nominated | |
| 25th Shanghai Television Festival | Best Supporting Actor | Gao Xin | Nominated | |
| 25th Shanghai Television Festival | Best Supporting Actor | Guo Jingfei | Won | |
| 25th Shanghai Television Festival | Best Supporting Actress | Li Nian | Nominated | |
| The Third Internet Film Festival | Most Capable Actor | Gao Xin | Won | |
| 24th Busan International Film Festival | Asian Contents Awards - Best Actress | Yao Chen | Won | |
| 26th Huading Awards | Best Actress | Yao Chen | Nominated | |
| 26th Huading Awards | Best Supporting Actor | Guo Jingfei | Nominated | |
| 2nd Cultural and Entertainment Industry Congress | Drama of the Year | All Is Well | Nominated | |
| 2nd Cultural and Entertainment Industry Congress | Best Actor | Ni Dahong | Nominated | |
| 2nd Cultural and Entertainment Industry Congress | Best Actress (Drama) | Yao Chen | Nominated | |
| 2nd Cultural and Entertainment Industry Congress | Best Supporting Actor (Drama) | Guo Jingfei | Nominated | |
| China Entertainment Industry Summit (Golden Pufferfish Awards) | Best Marketing | All Is Well | Won | |
| Golden Bud - The Fourth Network Film And Television Festival | Best Actor | Ni Dahong | Nominated | |
| Golden Bud - The Fourth Network Film And Television Festival | Best Actress | Yao Chen | Nominated | |
| Baidu Fudian Awards | Top Ten Television Series | All Is Well | Won | |
| Sina Film & TV Award Ceremony | Top Ten Television Series | All Is Well | Won | |
| Tencent Video All Star Awards | Drama of the Year | All Is Well | Won | |
| Tencent Video All Star Awards | TV Actor of the Year | Yao Chen | Won | |
| Film and TV Role Model 2019 Ranking | Quality Television Series | All is Well | Won | |
| Film and TV Role Model 2019 Ranking | Best Actress | Yao Chen | Won | |
| 30th China TV Golden Eagle Award | Best Television Series | All Is Well | Nominated | |
| 32nd Flying Apsaras Awards | Outstanding Television Series | All Is Well | Nominated | |
| 32nd Flying Apsaras Awards | Outstanding Actor | Ni Dahong | Nominated | |
