= Central Academy of Drama =

Drama school in Beijing, China

- 中央戏剧学院
- Type: National
- Established: 1950; 76 years ago
- Affiliations: Ministry of Education
- President: Vacant
- Vice-president: Yang Wenhai (杨文海)
- Location: Beijing, China
- Campus: Urban
- Colors
- Website: chntheatre.edu.cn en.chntheatre.edu.cn

Central Academy of Drama
- Simplified Chinese: 中央戏剧学院
- Traditional Chinese: 中央戲劇學院
Transcriptions
Standard Mandarin
- Hanyu Pinyin: Zhōngyāng Xìjù Xuéyuàn
- Wade–Giles: Chungyang Hsichü Hsüehyüan
Yue: Cantonese
- Yale Romanization: Jung1 yang1 Syi4 jyu4 Sywe2 ywan4
- Jyutping: Zung^{1} joeng^{1} Hei^{3} kek^{6} Hok^{6} jyun^{2}

The Central Academy of Drama (Chinese: 中央戏剧学院; pinyin: Zhōngyāng Xìjù Xuéyuàn) is a national public drama school in Beijing, China. It is affiliated with the Ministry of Education. The academy is part of the Double First-Class Construction.

== History ==
The school was originally established in 1938. Mao Zedong, who was the Chairman of China, personally named, designed and wrote the school emblem.

The Central Academy of Drama, formed by the merger of two schools, was final established in April 1950, with Ouyang Yuqian as its first president, and was named by Mao Zedong.

It inherited the drama department of Lu Xun Art Academy in Yan'an (founded in 1938), the art school of North China University, and the National Drama College in Nanjing (founded in 1935).

In January 1950, the Government Affairs Council of the Central People's Government officially approved the renaming of the National Academy of Drama to the "Central Academy of Drama". On April 2, the founding meeting of the Central Academy of Drama was held. In the early days of the college's establishment, in order to adapt to the dual tasks of teaching and performance creation at that time, the college first offered one-year general courses for training, and successively launched two-year undergraduate courses; trained professional cadres at provincial and military levels and above to improve professional standards. It established the opera department, drama department, stage art department, as well as general subjects, dance sports cadre training class, Cui Chengxi dance research class, etc.

Starting in the summer of 1953, various departments of the college began recruiting undergraduate students from all over the country. To this end, the college has made major adjustments to the professional setting and teaching system, abolished the Opera Department, and established the Performance Department, the Directing Department, the Stage Art Department, and the Drama Literature Department on the basis of the original Drama Department, physical education, vocal music and other teaching and research groups.

Many famous actors, actresses and directors have graduated from the Academy including Zhang Ziyi, Jiang Wen, Gong Li, Zhao Jinmai , Li Landi and Wang Xingyue.

As of October 2022, the school has 16 undergraduate teaching units (including the Basic Teaching Department, the Ideological and Political Theory Teaching and Research Department, and the Humanities Department), 11 undergraduate majors, and 27 undergraduate major directions (excluding international projects).

== Rankings and reputation ==
The Central Academy of Drama is regarded as the most prestigious drama school in China and ranked 2nd in Asia and 32nd in the world by the 2021 QS World University Rankings in Performing Arts.

== Notable alumni ==
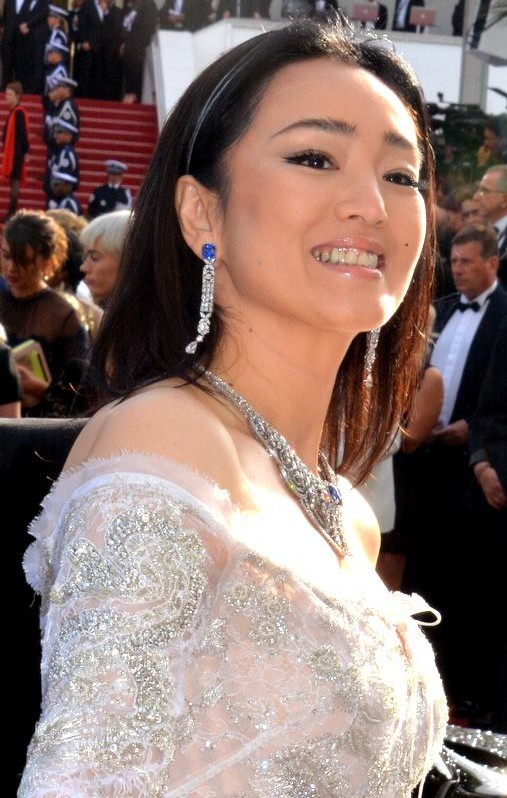
Gong Li

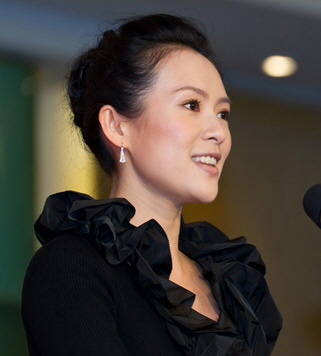
Zhang Ziyi

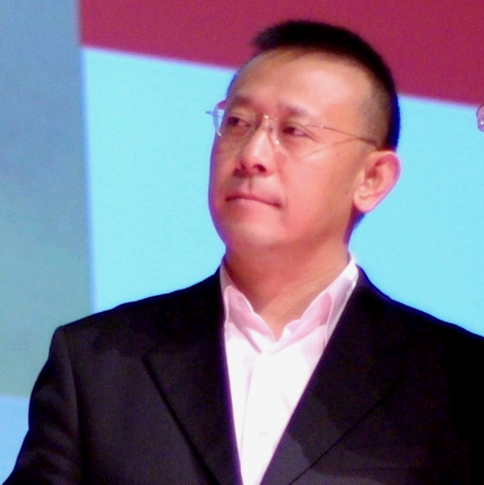
Jiang Wen

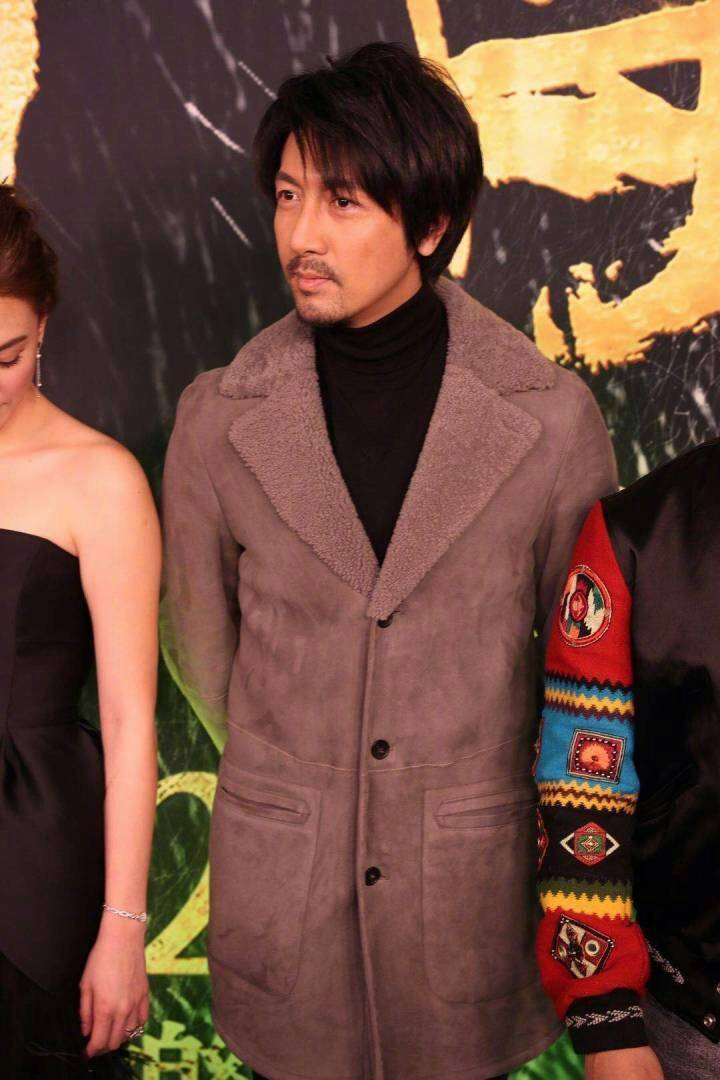
Zhang Luyi

Note that class year indicates the entrance year, not graduating year.

Acting Department

- Class of 1950: Jin Yaqin
- Class of 1954: Zheng Zhenyao
- Class of 1959: Yan Shunkai
- Class of 1960: Wen Xingyu
- Class of 1974: Chen Baoguo, Guo Lianwen
- Class of 1979: Chen Daoming
- Class of 1980: Jiang Wen, Lü Liping, Yue Hong
- Class of 1982: Ni Dahong
- Class of 1984: Zhang Hanyu, Wu Xiubo
- Class of 1985: Gong Li, Jia Hongsheng, Wei Zi, Chen Wei
- Class of 1986: Chen Zhihui
- Class of 1987: Hu Jun, Xu Fan
- Class of 1988: Guo Tao, Wu Xiubo
- Class of 1989: Tao Hong
- Class of 1990: Li Yapeng, Chen Jianbin
- Class of 1991: Huang Zhizhong
- Class of 1993: Zhu Yuanyuan, Wang Qianyuan
- Class of 1994: Tao Hong, Gong Beibi, Duan Yihong
- Class of 1995: Xia Yu
- Class of 1996: Zhang Ziyi, Liu Ye, Qin Hailu, Mei Ting, Yuan Quan, Qin Hao
- Class of 1997: Chen Hao, Calvin Li
- Class of 1998: Deng Chao, Zhu Yuchen
- Class of 1999: Chen Sicheng, Zhang Luyi
- Class of 2000: Zhou Yun, Liu Yun, Gao Lu
- Class of 2001: Zhang Xinyi
- Class of 2002: Wen Zhang, Tiffany Tang, Tong Yao, Bai Baihe, Bai Jing, Yang Shuo, Zhang Mo
- Class of 2003: Wang Kai,
- Class of 2004: Tong Liya, Wang Zhi, Hu Sang, Zheng Qingwen, Cao Xiwen
- Class of 2005: Chen Xiao, Mao Xiaotong, Lin Xiawei, Lin Peng, Ying Er, Zhang Jianing
- Class of 2006: Liu Yuxin, Song Yi
- Class of 2007: Wei Daxun, Cheng Yi, Hans Zhang
- Class of 2008: Ma Ke, Lan Yingying, Gao Weiguang
- Class of 2009: Bai Yu
- Class of 2010: Yang Yang, Qiao Xin, Liu Xueyi, Qin Junjie, Zhao Yingzi
- Class of 2012: Yang Xuwen, Liang Jie
- Class of 2013: Qu Chuxiao, Zhang Ming'en, Wu Jiayi
- Class of 2014: Dong Zijian, Chen Xingxu
- Class of 2015: Liu Haoran, Dong Sicheng
- Class of 2016: Zhang Xueying, Zhao Jiamin
- Class of 2017: Wang Xingyue
- Class of 2018: Jackson Yee, Hu Xianxu, Li Landi
- Class of 2019: Jiang Yiyi
- Class of 2020: Zhao Jinmai
- Class of 2021: Wen Qi, Zhang Zhenyuan
- Class of 2022: Ma Jiaqi, Song Yaxuan

Directing Department

- Class of 1977: Bao Guo'an
- Class of 1979: Li Baotian
- Class of 1988: Zhang Yang
- Class of 1997: Zhang Jingchu
- Class of 1999: Lin Yongjian
- Class of 2000: Tang Wei
- Class of 2005: Papi Jiang

Musical Theatre Department

- Class of 1995: Sun Honglei
- Class of 1999: Jin Dong
- Class of 2014: Zhang Xincheng

Stage Design Department

- Class of 1995: Zhang Lei

Dramatic Literature Department

- Class of 1986: Zhang Yibai
- Class of 1987: Diao Yinan
- Class of 1988: Cai Shangjun
- Class of 1993: Yilin Zhong
