= My Youthfulness =

- Genre: Youth; Drama
- Written by: Gao Xuan; Ren Baoru
- Directed by: Zhao Baogang
- Starring: Lu Yi; Zhao Ziqi; Wang Luodan; Zhu Yuchen; Lin Yuan; Zhang Yi
- Opening theme: A Person's Decision by Jon Yen
- Ending theme: Sisterhood by Christy Chung
- Country of origin: China
- Original language: Mandarin
- No. of episodes: 32

Production
- Producer: Zhao Baogang
- Production companies: Beijing Xinbaoyuan Movie & TV Investment Co., Ltd

Original release
- Network: CCTV
- Release: 12 April 2009

Related
- Struggle

My Youthfulness (Chinese: 我的青春谁做主) is a 2009 Chinese television series directed by Zhao Baogang. It is part of the "Youth" trilogy directed by Zhao, which includes Struggle (2007) and Beijing Youth (2012).

== Synopsis ==
My Youthfulness is a complex story that mainly focuses on the lives of three cousins: Zhao Qingchu (Zhao Ziqi), Qian Xiaoyang (Wang Luodan), and Li Pili (Lin Yuan). Self-assured, confident, yet naive, they make the transition into adulthood. The drama accurately captures the everyday problems faced by young adults both at work and at home and the measures they take to overcome these obstacles.

== Cast ==
- Lu Yi as Zhou Jin
- Zhao Ziqi as Zhao Qingchu
- Wang Luodan as Qian Xiaoyang
- Zhu Yuchen as Fang Yu
- Lin Yuan as Li Pili
- Zhang Yi as Gao Qi
- Su Xiaoming as Yang Er
- Gai Ke as Yang Yi
- Fang Zige as Li Bohuai
- Cong Shan as Yang Shan
- Li Ranran as Lang Xinping
- Bai Baihe as Lei Lei

== Soundtrack ==
No.	Title	Singer	Length
1.	"A Person's Decision (一个人的决定)" (Opening theme song)	Jon Yen
2.	"Sisterhood (好姐妹)" (Ending theme song)	Christy Chung
3.	"Only For You (只为了你)"	Jon Yen

== Awards ==
Year	Award	Category	Nominated work	Ref.
2010	Shanghai Television Festival	Most Popular Actress	Wang Luodan	
2011	Flying Apsaras Awards	Outstanding Serial Drama	My Youthfulness	
