= Struggle (TV series) =

- Genre: Youth; Drama; Romance
- Based on: Struggle by Shi Kang
- Written by: Shi Kang
- Directed by: Zhao Baogang
- Starring: Tong Dawei; Ma Yili; Wen Zhang; Li Xiaolu; Wang Luodan; Zhu Yuchen
- Opening theme: I'm Fine by Liu Qin
- Ending theme: Comparative by Qiu Ye
- Country of origin: China
- Original language: Mandarin
- No. of episodes: 32

Production
- Producer: Zhao Baogang
- Running time: 45 minutes
- Production companies: Beijing Xinbaoyuan Movie & TV Investment Co., Ltd

Original release
- Network: Beijing TV
- Release: 16 May 2007

Related
- My Youthfulness

Struggle (simplified Chinese: 奋斗; traditional Chinese: 奮鬥; pinyin: Fèndòu) is a 2007 Chinese television series directed by Zhao Baogang, based on the award-winning novel of the same name by Shi Kang. It is part of the 'Youth' trilogy directed by Zhao, which includes My Youthfulness (2009) and Beijing Youth (2012).

== Synopsis ==
About the aspirations and struggles of China's Post-80's generation after graduation from college.

== Cast ==
- Tong Dawei as Lu Tao
- Ma Yili as Xia Lin
- Wen Zhang as Xiang Nan
- Li Xiaolu as Yang Xiaoyun
- Wang Luodan as Mi Cai
- Zhu Yuchen as Hua Zi
- Ivy Chen as Fang Lingshan

== Soundtrack ==
No.	Title	Singer	Length
1.	"I'm Fine (我很好)" (Opening theme song)	Liu Qin
2.	"Comparatively (相对)" (Ending theme song)	Qiu Ye
3.	"Left Side (左边)"	Rainie Yang

== Reception ==
Struggle was well received by its post-80's generation audiences. Many rated the series highly, calling it "a milestone in Chinese TV productions" for the innovative break-away from the traditional style of Chinese television drama. The series' recreation of realistic youth life was also praised by its audience, most of which calling it the first Chinese television drama to successfully convey the feelings, attitudes, ways of thinking, colloquial language of the generation.

However, many Chinese netizens have complained that some scenes in the series are unrealistic, particularly the scene in which the 20-year-old protagonist owns and drives an Audi.
