= Sichuan Television Festival =

Sichuan Television Festival 四川电视节
- Awarded for: Excellence in Television
- Country: China
- First award: 1991
- Website: http://www.sctvf.com

The Sichuan Television Festival (Chinese: 四川电视节), abbreviated SCTVF, also known as the Sichuang International Television Festival, is one of the largest television festivals in East Asia. The Sichuan TV Festival develops from Sichuan International TV Week, which was held in Chengdu in February 1990. Held since 1991, STVF has become one of the most prestigious international television festivals in Asia.

The festival is also home to the bi-annual Gold Panda Awards (Chinese: 金熊猫奖; pinyin: Jin Xiong Mao Jiang), the awards features the categories of miniseries, made-for-TV movies and TV series.

== See also ==
- List of Asian television awards
