= Ni Dahong =

Chinese actor

- 倪大红
- Born: April 18, 1960 (age 66); Harbin, Heilongjiang, China
- Education: Central Academy of Drama
- Occupation: Actor
- Years active: 1991–present
- Agents: Beijing Forbidden City Film Limited-liability Company; Dongshen Future K·ARTISTS (2018–present)
- Spouse: Ni Wei

Chinese name
- Traditional Chinese: 倪大紅
- Simplified Chinese: 倪大红
Transcriptions
Standard Mandarin
- Hanyu Pinyin: Ní Dàhóng

Alternative Chinese name
- Chinese: 倪大宏
Transcriptions
Standard Mandarin
- Hanyu Pinyin: Ní Dàhóng

Ni Dahong (Chinese: 倪大红; born 18 April 1960) is a Chinese actor best known for his roles as Sima Yi in the historical television series Three Kingdoms, based on the classical novel Romance of the Three Kingdoms by Luo Guanzhong; and Su Daqiang in family drama All Is Well.

== Early life and education ==
Ni was born in Harbin, Heilongjiang in 1960. Ni became a sent-down youth in Daqing after Mao Zedong launched the Down to the Countryside Movement. In 1980, he was accepted to Jixi Drama Troupe (鸡西话剧团) as a student. In 1986 he graduated from Central Academy of Drama and was assigned to National Experimental Theatre (now National Theatre Company of China).

== Acting career ==
In 1984, Ni made his film debut in Xie Jin's Wreaths at the Foot of the Mountain.

In 1991, Ni was cast in I'm A Countryman, making his television debut.

In 1993, he got a small role in Chen Peisi's comedy film Filial Son And Filial Piety.

In 1994, he co-starred with Song Dandan in the family comedy I Love My Family. That same year, he appeared as Long Er in Zhang Yimou's To Live, an epic film adaptation based on the novel of the same name by Yu Hua.

In 2006, he was cast as imperial physician Jiang in Curse of the Golden Flower, an epic drama film written and directed by Zhang Yimou.

Ni had a minor role as Sun Maocai in Qiao Family Courtyard (2007), which earned him a Best Supporting Actor Award at the 3rd TV Shows and Awards.

In 2009, Ni had a supporting role in Zhang Yimou's A Simple Noodle Story. The same year, he featured in The Message, adapted from Mai Jia's novel of the same title. The espionage thriller was directed by Chen Kuo-fu and Gao Qunshu.

Ni co-starred with in the 2010 crime film Wind Blast, directed by Gao Qunshu. That same year, he starred as Sima Yi in the historical television series Three Kingdoms, based on Luo Guanzhong's classical novel Romance of the Three Kingdoms. He received positive reviews for the role. He played the lead role of Judge Tian in Judge, for which he received Best Actor Award nominations at the 47th Golden Horse Awards and Asian Film Critics Association Awards.

In 2012, he starred in a crime thriller film Lethal Hostage.

In 2014, Ni had key supporting role as Wei Zhongxian in The White Haired Witch of Lunar Kingdom, a wuxia-fantasy 3D film loosely adapted from Liang Yusheng's novel Baifa Monü Zhuan.

In 2015, he co-starred with Wu Jing and Yu Nan in the action film Wolf Warriors.

In 2016, Ni played the lead role as Yan Song in the historical television series Counter-Japanese Hero Qi Jiguang.

In 2019, Ni gained recognition for his role as Su Daqiang in the hit family drama All Is Well.

== Personal life ==
Ni married Ni Wei (倪炜), who is Ni Ping's sister.

== Filmography ==
=== Film ===
Year	English Title	Chinese Title	Role	Notes/Ref.
1984	Wreaths at the Foot of the Mountain	高山下的花环	Duan Yuguo	
1993	Filial Son And Filial Piety	孝子贤孙伺候着	Brother-in-law	
1993	New Stories of an Assassin	刺客新传之杀人者唐斩		
1994	To Live	活着	Long Er	
1996	Journey To Western Xia Empire	西夏路迢迢		
2006	Loach Is Fish Too	泥鳅也是鱼	Nan Niqiu	
2006	Curse of the Golden Flower	满城尽带黄金甲	Imperial physician Jiang	
2008	Love at Restaurant	味道男女	Bao Yipin	
2009	A Simple Noodle Story	三枪拍案惊奇	Wangwu Mazi	
2009	Birthday	生日	Li Si	
2009	The Message	风声	The dustman	
2010	Wind Blast	西风烈	He Jianzhong	
2010	Judge	透析	Judge Tian	
2011	Together	幸存日	Lao Jingwang	
2011	Love Never Dies	堵车	Hua Yang	
2012	The Assassins	铜雀台	Fu Wan	
2012	Lethal Hostage	边境风云	Xiao An's father	
2012	Bring Happiness Home	快乐到家	The butler	
2013	Better and Better	越来越好之村晚	Old man Geng	
2013	Singing When We Are Young	初恋未满	Jiujiu's father	
2014	The White Haired Witch of Lunar Kingdom	白发魔女之明月天国	Wei Zhongxian	
2015	Wolf Warriors	战狼	Min Deng	
2015	The Assassin	刺客聂隐娘	Nie Feng	
2016	The Wasted Times	罗曼蒂克消亡史	Mr. Wang	
2017	Intrude The Widow Village at Midnight	夜闯寡妇村	Second Master Huang	Web film
2018	Genghis Khan	战神纪	Sa'man	
2021	Cliff Walkers	悬崖之上	Gao Bin	

=== Television series ===
Year	English title	Chinese title	Role	Notes/Ref.
1991	I'm A Countryman	我是乡巴佬		
1994	I Love My Family	我爱我家	Hu A'da	Cameo, Episode 93–94
1994		针眼儿警官	Wu Guoqing	
2005	Mills Woman	磨坊女人	Lao Jingtai	
2006	Qiao's Grand Courtyard	乔家大院	Sun Maocai	
2007	Ming Dynasty in 1566	大明王朝1566	Yan Song	
2008	Eight Brothers	八兄弟	Leng Dahu	
2008	Big Year	大过年	Feng Jiandong	
2009	The Pawnshop	当铺	You Zhaodai	
2009	The Line	生死线	Gao Sanbao	
2010	Confucius Spring and Autumn	孔子春秋	Duke Xiang of Lu	
2010	Bridge of Life and Death	生死桥	Lao Ba	
2010	Three Kingdoms	三国	Sima Yi	
2011	Guns Hou	枪炮侯	Hou Jiuman	
2011	Sleek Rat, the Challenger	白玉堂之局外局	Chen Zhen	
2011	Falling Leaves in Chang'an	叶落长安	Bai Laosi	
2011	A Walk to Happiness	幸福满满	Father Liu	
2011	Forever Designation	永不磨灭的番号	Cui Xiaobian	
2012	Nos Annees Francaises	我们的法兰西岁月	Wu Zhihui	Cameo
2012	Forest in Shanghai	上海森林	Tong Yuanshan	
2012		其实我想留	Ma Wenru	
2013	Love Is Not Blind	失恋33天		Cameo
2013	The Story of Zheng Yang Gate	正阳门下	Guan Yushan	
2013	Legendary Life	江湖正道	Zhang Caiming	
2014		七九河开	Wang Youfu	
2014	All Quiet in Peking	北平无战事	Xie Peidong	
2014	The Great Protector	镖门	Lu Zongshan	
2014	Walking on the Blade	锋刃	Lao Tan	
2014	Naked Marriage Afterwards	裸婚之后	Chi Xiang's father	
2015	The Merchants of Qing Dynasty	大清盐商	Qianlong Emperor	
2015	Tiger Mom	虎妈猫爸	Father Zhao	Cameo
2015	The Legendary Shopkeeper	传奇大掌柜	Zhang Zongxiang	Cameo
2015	Truth and Trust	后海不是海	Huo Zhongshi	
2015	The Love of Courtyard	情满四合院	He Daqing	
2015	The National Hero Qi Jiguang	抗倭英雄戚继光	Yan Song	
2016	The Golden Water Bridge	金水桥边	Zheng Wentian	
2016		百炼成爹	Qian Daguang	
2016	My Kungfu Father-in-law	我的岳父会武术	Cheng Dajie	
2017	Tracks In The Snow Forest	林海雪原	Zuo Sandiao	
2017	Super Father-In-Law & Son-In-Law	超级翁婿	Zhu Li	
2018	Mr. Right	恋爱先生	Cheng Hongdou	
2018	Great Expectations	远大前程	Huo Tianqi	
2018	The Rise of Phoenixes	天盛长歌	Emperor	
2018	The Dream and the Glory	那些年，我们正年轻	Liu Lianzhu	
2018	Wild Fire	野火	Premier Liu	
2018	The Story of Zheng Yang Gate II	正阳门下小女人	Guan Yushan	
2018	Ever Night	将夜	Wei Guangming	
2019	All Is Well	都挺好	Su Daqiang	
2019	Unbeatable You	逆流而上的你	Gao Hongbin	
2019	Doctor of Traditional Chinese Medicine	老中医	Royal physician	Cameo
2019	My True Friend	我的真朋友		Cameo
2019	For the Holy Guiguzi	谋圣鬼谷子	King of Chu	
2020	Kidnapping Game	绑架游戏	Wu Yuhe	
2020	Together	在一起	Mr.Ni	
2026	Swords Into Plowshares	太平年	Hu Jinsi	
TBA	Nowhere to Hide	无处躲藏		
TBA	The Best of Times	最好的时代		
TBA	Simmer Down	好好说话	Liao Hanqiu	

=== Variety show ===
Year	English title	Chinese title	Role	Notes
2021	China in Classics	典籍里的中国	Fu Sheng	

== Awards ==
Year	Work	Award	Category	Result	Ref.
2007	Qiao's Grand Courtyard	3rd TV Drama Awards	Best Supporting Actor	Won	
2010	Judge	47th Golden Horse Awards	Best Actor	Nominated	
2013	Lethal Hostage	Golden Phoenix Awards	Society Award	Won	
2015	No Fighting in Beijing	21st Shanghai Television Festival	Best Supporting Actor	Nominated	
2016	All Quiet in Peking	24th China TV Golden Eagle Award	Best Actor	Nominated	
2016		3rd The Actors of China Award Ceremony	Best Actor (Ruby)	Won	
2018	Tracks in the Snow Forest	24th Shanghai Television Festival	Best Supporting Actor	Nominated	
2019	All Is Well	25th Shanghai Television Festival	Best Actor	Won	
2019	All Is Well	Golden Bud – The Fourth Network Film And Television Festival	Best Actor	Nominated	
2019	The Story of Zheng Yang Gate II	26th Huading Awards	Best Actor	Nominated	
2019	The Story of Zheng Yang Gate II	26th Huading Awards	Best Actor (Period drama)	Nominated	
2020	All Is Well	32nd Flying Apsaras Awards	Outstanding Actor	Nominated	
