= Takako Matsu discography =

- Studio albums: 10
- Live albums: 2
- Compilation albums: 3
- Singles: 21
- Video albums: 7
- Music videos: 20
- Other appearances: 3

The discography of Japanese actress and singer-songwriter Takako Matsu includes ten studio, three compilation, two live, seven video albums, twenty-one singles, and twenty music videos. Born into a family of actors, Matsu made her debut as a stage performer before her roles in TV dramas (beginning with the 1994 NHK taiga drama series Hana no Ran) and films (beginning with 1997's Tokyo Biyori). That year she released her first single, "Ashita, Haru ga Kitara", which peaked at number 8 on the Oricon Singles Chart and was certified platinum by the Recording Industry Association of Japan (RIAJ) for shipments of 400,000 copies. Matsu's debut album, Sora no Kagami (also released that year), peaked at number 4 on the Oricon Albums Chart. Selling over 300,000 copies, it earned a platinum certification from the RIAJ and Matsu was named Best New Artist of the Year at the 12th Japan Gold Disc Awards.

In 1998 she starred in the Shunji Iwai short film April Story as Uzuki Nireno, a shy girl who leaves home to attend the University of Tokyo. For the film's soundtrack, Matsu performed five piano songs. Her second studio album, Ai no Tobira, was released on Arista Japan the same year; it peaked at number 3 on the Oricon chart, and was certified gold by the RIAJ. Moving to Universal Japan in 1999, Matsu released "Yume no Shizuku"; it peaked at number 8 on the Oricon chart, her fourth top-ten hit on the Oricon Singles Chart. Her album Itsuka, Sakura no Ame ni... was also certified gold. About a year later, Matsu's fourth studio album (A Piece of Life) and first compilation album (Five Years: Singles) were released. Both peaked in the top five on the Oricon Albums Chart, and the latter was certified gold. A live album of her A Piece of Life concert tour, released in 2002, peaked at number 32 on the Oricon Albums Chart; the tour DVD reached number 8 on the Oricon DVD chart. Matsu's next two studio albums peaked at number 12 on the Oricon chart.

In 2004 "Toki no Fune", co-written by Matsu and Akeboshi and produced by the latter, was released as the first single from her seventh studio album (Bokura ga Ita). The song, the theme for the TBS drama series Tōbōsha Runaway, peaked at number 5 on the Oricon singles chart and the album peaked at number 14 on the albums chart. In 2006 Matsu released "Minna Hitori", another top-10 hit. Her parent studio album, Cherish You, peaked at the same position on the Oricon Albums Chart. After the disappointing performance of her ninth studio album (Time for Music) and its accompanying singles, Matsu's musical career saw a resurgence with "Let It Go" (which she performed for the Japanese version of the Disney animated film, Frozen); the song peaked at number 2 on the Billboard Japan Hot 100, and was certified million by the RIAJ.

== Studio albums ==
Title	Album details	Peak chart positions (JP)	Sales (JPN)	Certifications
Sora no Kagami	Released: June 28, 1997; Label: Arista Japan; Format(s): CD	4	301,000	JPN: Platinum
Ai no Tobira	Released: September 23, 1998; Label: Arista Japan; Format(s): CD	3	245,000	JPN: Gold
Itsuka, Sakura no Ame ni...	Released: March 23, 2000; Label: Polydor; Format(s): CD	7	194,000	JPN: Gold
A Piece of Life	Released: June 13, 2001; Label: Universal Japan; Format(s): CD	4	120,000	
Home Grown	Released: February 19, 2003; Label: Universal Japan; Format(s): CD	12	43,000	
Harvest Songs	Released: October 8, 2003; Label: Universal Japan; Format(s): CD	12	38,000	
Bokura ga Ita (僕らがいた; "We Were There")	Released: April 26, 2006; Label: Ariola Japan; Format(s): CD	14	29,000	
Cherish You	Released: April 25, 2007; Label: Ariola Japan; Format(s): CD, CD+DVD	10	35,000	
Time for Music	Released: November 25, 2009; Label: Ariola Japan; Format(s): CD, CD+DVD	43	6,000	
Ashita wa Doko kara	Released: December 6, 2017; Label: Ariola Japan; Format(s): CD, CD+DVD	—		

== Compilation albums ==
Title	Album details	Peak chart positions (JP)	Sales	Certifications
Five Years: Singles	Released: December 5, 2001; Label: Universal Japan; Format(s): CD	3	281,000	JPN: Gold
Matsu Takako Single Collection 1999–2005	Released: June 28, 2006; Label: Universal Japan; Format(s): CD	59	6,000	
Footsteps: 10th Anniversary Complete Best	Released: June 25, 2008; Label: Ariola Japan; Format(s): CD, CD+DVD	22	15,000	

== Live albums ==
Title	Album details	Peak chart positions (JP)	Sales	Certifications
Takako Matsu Concert Tour Vol. 1 "A Piece of Life"	Released: February 21, 2002; Label: Universal Japan; Format(s): CD	32	14,000	
Takako Matsu Concert Tour 2003 "Second Wave"	Released: March 24, 2004; Label: Universal Japan; Format(s): CD, CD+DVD	52	6,000	

== LP records ==
Title	Album details	Peak chart positions (JP)	Sales	Certifications
Hyper Bug Mix	Released: August 21, 1997; Label: BMG Victor; Format(s): LP	—		

== Singles ==
=== As lead artist ===
Title	Year	Peak chart positions		Sales (JPN)	Certification	Album
Title	Year	Oricon chart	JPN Hot 100	Sales (JPN)	Certification	Album
"Ashita, Haru ga Kitara"	1997	8	65^{[A]}	432,000	JPN: Platinum	Sora no Kagami
"I Stand Alone"	1997	7	—	183,000	JPN: Gold	Sora no Kagami
"Wind Song"	1997	30	—	38,000	JPN: Gold	Sora no Kagami
"Mafuyu no Memories" (真冬のメモリーズ; "Midwinter Memories")	1997	22	—	77,000		Ai no Tobira
"Sakura Fuwari"	1998	9	—	96,000		Ai no Tobira
"Gomen ne." (ごめんね。; "Sorry")	1998	26	—	44,000		Ai no Tobira
"Stay with Me"	1998	20	—	96,000		Ai no Tobira
"Yume no Shizuku" (夢のしずく; "Droplets of Dreams")	1999	8	—	97,000		Itsuka, Sakura no Ame ni...
"Tsuki no Dance" (月のダンス; "Moon Dance")	1999	25	—	17,000		Itsuka, Sakura no Ame ni...
"Sakura no Ame, Itsuka"	2000	19	—	88,000		Itsuka, Sakura no Ame ni...
"Yasashii Kaze" (優しい風; "Gentle Breeze")	2000	25	—	21,000		A Piece of Life
"Koishii Hito" (コイシイヒト; "Beloved Person")	2001	16	—	63,000		A Piece of Life
"Hana no Yō ni" (花のように; "Like a Flower")	2001	23	—	24,000		Home Grown
"Clover"	2002	28	—	11,000		Home Grown
"Ashita ni Kuchizuke o" (明日にくちづけを; "A Kiss to Tomorrow")	2002	23	—	14,000		Home Grown
"Honto no Kimochi" (ほんとの気持ち; "True Feelings")	2003	16	—	27,000		Harvest Songs
"Toki no Fune" (時の舟; "Ship of Time")	2004	5	—	61,000		Bokura ga Ita
"Mirai ni Naru" (未来になる; "Becomes the Future")	2005	24	—	9,000		Bokura ga Ita
"Akari no Tomoru Hō e" (明かりの灯る方へ; "Towards the Burning Torch")	2006	24	—	14,000		Bokura ga Ita
"Minna Hitori" (みんなひとり; "Everyone's Alone")	2006	10	—	41,000		Cherish You
"Ashita, Haru ga Kitara 97–07"^{[B]}	2007	—	—			Cherish You
"Kimi to Nara" (君となら; "If I'm with You")	2009	38	44			Time for Music
"Egao o Misete" (笑顔をみせて; "Show Me a Smile")	2015	—	—			—N/a
"Ashita wa Doko kara" (明日はどこから)	2017	35	23	2,000		—N/a
"—" denotes items which did not chart.

=== Collaborations and promotional singles ===
Title	Year	Peak chart positions		Certifications	Album
Title	Year	Oricon chart	JPN Hot 100	Certifications	Album
"Futari no Murasaki Tokyo" (二人のムラサキ東京; "Our Purple Tokyo") (as Tokyo Jenne, with Kinmokusei)	2004	65	—		Best Condition: Kinmokusei Single Collection
"Waratte Misete Kure" (笑ってみせてくれ; "Give Laughing a Try") (with the Band for "Sanka")	2008	35	82		Non-album single
"Let It Go (Ari no Mama de)" (ありのままで; "As I Am")	2014	—	2	JPN (download): Million	Frozen: Original Soundtrack (Japanese version)
"Umarete Hajimete" (生まれて初めて; "For the First Time in Forever") (with Sayaka Kanda)	2014	—	19	JPN (download): Gold	Frozen: Original Soundtrack (Japanese version)
"Shiawase na Ketsumatsu" (幸せな結末; "Happy Ending") (with Masayuki Suzuki)	2014	—	70		Discover Japan II
"—" denoted items which failed to chart.

== Other album appearances ==
Song	Year	Album
"Zip-a-Dee-Doo-Dah"/"Beauty and the Beast Medley"	1998	We Love Mickey: Happy 70th Anniversary
"Caroline, No" (Yoshiyuki Sahashi with B-Girls A.K.A-Ms.T)	2004	Beach Boys Tribute: Best Of
"And I Love Car"	2013	Okuda Tamio Covers 2

== Videography ==
=== Video releases ===
Title	Album details	Notes
Film Sora no Kagami	Released: October 12, 1997; Label: BMG Japan	Released first as a VHS in 1997 and later as a DVD in 2003.; Contains videos of "I Stand Alone" and five other tracks from Sora no Kagami.; The DVD peaked at number 297 on the Oricon DVD chart.
Film Itsuka, Sakura no Ame ni	Released: April 5, 2000; Label: Polydor	Contains music videos of "Yume no Shizuku", "Tsuki no Dance", and "Sakura no Ame, Itsuka".; Peaked at number 8 on the Oricon DVD chart.
Concert Tour Vol. 1 "A Piece of Life" on Film	Released: February 21, 2002; Label: Polydor	Released in VHS and DVD formats.; Contains footage of Matsu's first concert tour of the same title.; Peaked at number 8 on Oricon DVD chart.
Tour Documentary Film "Diary": Concert Tour Vol. 1 "A Piece of Life"	Released: February 21, 2002; Label: Polydor	Contains behind-the-scenes footage of the concert "A Piece of Life".; Also contains journal entries by Matsu, chronicling her life while on tour.; Peaked at number 47 on the Oricon DVD chart.
Matsu Takako Concert Tour 2003 "Second Wave" on Film	Released: March 24, 2004; Label: Universal Japan	Contains footage of Matsu's second concert tour, "Second Wave".; Peaked at number 40 on the Oricon DVD chart.
Matsu Takako Concert Tour 2007 "I Cherish You" on Film	Released: November 21, 2007; Label: BMG Japan	Contains footage of Matsu's third concert tour, "I Cherish You".; Peaked at number 42 on the Oricon DVD chart.
Takako Matsu Concert Tour 2010 "Time for Music"	Released: February 6, 2010; Label: Ariola Japan	Contains footage of Matsu's fourth concert tour, "Time for Music".; Peaked at number 73 on the Oricon chart.

=== Music videos ===
Title	Year	Director
"Sora no Kagami"	1997	Shunji Iwai
"I Stand Alone"	1997	Shunji Iwai
"Mafuyu no Memories"	1997	Shunji Iwai
"Sakura Fuwari"	1998	Shunji Iwai
"Gomen ne."	1998	Jun Hara
"Stay with Me"	1998	Shunji Iwai
"Yume no Shizuku"	1999	Hiroyuki Itaya
"Tsuki no Dance"	1999	Hiroyuki Itaya
"Sakura no Ame, Itsuka"	2000	Hiroyuki Itaya
"Koishii Hito"	2001	Hideaki Anno
"Hana no Yō ni"	2001	Hiroyuki Itaya
"Ashita ni Kuchizuke o"	2002	Hiroyuki Itaya
"Honto no Kimochi"	2003	Hiroyuki Itaya
"Home Grown"	2003	Hiroyuki Itaya
"Toki no Fune"	2004	Hiroyuki Itaya
"Mirai ni Naru"	2005	Tetsuma Maki
"Akari no Tomoru Hō e"	2006	Tsuyoshi Inoue
"Minna Hitori"	2006	Tetsuya Nakashima
"Kimi to Nara"	2009	Yuki Ueda
"Let It Go"	2014	Chris Buck, Jennifer Lee
