= Smoking Gun =

A smoking gun is an object or fact that serves as conclusive evidence of a crime or similar act.

Smoking Gun(s) may also refer to:

== Film, television, and video games ==
- JFK: The Smoking Gun, a book by Colin McLaren and TV documentary on Howard Donahue's theory on the Kennedy assassination
- "The Smoking Gun" (Ashes to Ashes), a television episode of British television series Ashes to Ashes
- Smoking Gun (TV series), a 2014 Japanese drama
  - Smoking Gun - Minkan Kasōken Chōsa'in Nagareda Midori, 2012 Japanese mystery manga series on which it is based
- Smoking Guns, 2016 British film
- Smoking Gun Interactive, video game company
- Smoking Gun Productions, an Australian film production company headed by Kristian Moliere

== Music ==
- Smoking Gun (album), 2009, by Lady of the Sunshine
- "Smoking Gun" (song), 1986, by Robert Cray

== Other uses ==
- The Smoking Gun, a website that posts legal documents, arrest records, and police mugshots

== See also ==
- Nixon White House tapes § "Smoking Gun" tape
- Smoking gun memo, the note of a secret 23 July 2002 meeting concerning the Iraq War
- The Smoking Gunns, a wrestling tag team
- truTV Presents: World's Dumbest..., a cable television series formerly carrying the brand of the Smoking Gun website
