= Tomorrow (Taiwanese TV series) =

- Promotional poster
- Also known as: 愛情白皮書; Ai Qing Bai Pi Shu; White Book of Love
- Genre: Romance
- Created by: Fumi Saimon
- Based on: Asunaro Hakusho by Fumi Saimon
- Starring: Rainie Yang; Shawn Yue; Christine Fan; Eddie Peng
- Opening theme: "啟程" [Journey] by Christine Fan
- Ending theme: "有你真好" [Good To Have You] by Rainie Yang and Christine Fan
- Country of origin: Republic of China (Taiwan)
- Original language: Mandarin

Production
- Production locations: Taipei, Taiwan

Original release
- Network: China Television (CTV) (中視)
- Release: 2002

Related
- Asunaro Hakusho

Tomorrow (Chinese: 愛情白皮書; pinyin: Ai Qing Bai Pi Shu) is a 2002 Taiwanese drama starring Rainie Yang, Shawn Yue, Christine Fan and Eddie Peng. It is based on the Japanese manga series, Asunaro Hakusho (あすなろ白書; Asunaro White Paper), written by Fumi Saimon. It was broadcast in Taiwan on China Television (CTV) (中視) in 2002.

== Synopsis ==
The story of Tomorrow describes high school gymnast Chen Mei who was injured during practice and was helped by a stranger (Kua-Chu), thus begins a love and friendship story lasting 8 years.

Chen Mei, in her third year of high school, becomes acquainted with the members of the "Tomorrow Club", which includes: Kua Chu, Chu Shou, Hsin Hwa and Sung Kang. Chen Mei is attracted to Kua Chu. However, due to her mother's illness she loses contact with them. Then upon entering university she meets up with Kua Chu and members of the "Tomorrow Club". Though Kua Chu has a girlfriend, called Shih Huei, he still finds the courage to express his love for Chen Mei. At once, they fall passionately in love, but the reunion fails and they decide to break up. Chen Mei enters a relationship with Chu Shou, who has carried a torch for Chen Mei, but she still misses Kua Chu.

Coincidentally, both Hsin Hwa and Sung Kang also harbour a secret love for Kua Chu. At one point, Sung Kang expresses his feeling to Kua Chu, he sleeps with Hsin Hwa. Kua Chu is pressured to withdraw from his school studies because he is discovered working as a waiter in a gigolo club. When Chu Shou discovers that Chen Mei doesn't love him, he breaks up with Chen Mei and works overseas. On Chu Shou's birthday, he drives Sung Kang out for relaxation. However, an accident happens along the way and Sung Kang dies. At the time, Hsin Hwa has Sung Kang's child.

Hsin Hwa returns to her hometown and gives birth to the baby while Chu Shou joins a forest photographic team overseas and Kua Chu furthers his studies in Japan, which now leaves him and Chen Mei in two different places. This long-distance love makes Chen Mei continually suspicions and Kua Chu becomes very discontented. In addition, Kua Chu meets Wei Ching in Japan, which causes Chen Mei to break up with Kua Chu when she realizes it.

Four years later, Chen Mei works as a secretary for the general manager of a company. Members of the "Tomorrow Club arrange a gathering to get together again. Kua Chu still goes with Wei Ching and Chen Mei goes with her supervisor, Chiu Ting. Wei Ching is a mature and intelligent girl, she discovers that Kua Chu still loves Chen Mei. She decides to break up with Kua Chu and let him go with Chen Mei. To take the opportunity to study overseas, Hsin Hwa decides to let Sung Kang's parents take care of Shiau-Liang. Kua Chu suddenly announces that he will adopt Shiau-Liang and proposes to marry Chen Mei ...

== Cast ==
- Rainie Yang as Yuan Cheng Mei
- Shawn Yue as Ou Yang Gua Ju
- Eddie Peng as Qu Shou Zhi
- Christine Fan as Ji Xing Hua
- Raymond Li as Zhao Song Gang
- Sunnie Huang as Xiao Rou
- Chiang Tsu-ping as Wei Ching

== Music ==
- Opening theme song: "啟程" Qi Cheng [Journey] by Christine Fan
- Ending theme song: "有你真好" You Ni Zhen Hao [Good To Have You] by Rainie Yang and Christine Fan

Tomorrow Original Soundtrack (愛情白皮書 電視原聲帶)

- Label: Decca Records Taiwan
- Released: 2 August 2002
- Language: Mandarin
- Format: Studio album (CD+DVD)
- Genre: Mandopop

Track listing

1. "愛情萬歲～我們的序曲" (Viva Love - Our Song version) by Chang Chung Li - instrumental
2. "明曰～通往明天的旅行" (Tomorrow - Journet version) by Chang Chung Li - instrumental
3. "啟程" Qi Cheng [Journey] by Christine Fan - opening theme
4. "啟程演奏版～成美與掛居的邂逅" (Journey) by Chang Chung Li - instrumental
5. "大學生～成美的第一個步伐" (University Student) by Chang Chung Li - instrumental
6. "明日～不要哭" (Tomorrow Is Another Day!) by Chang Chung Li - instrumental
7. "愛情萬歲～複雜的N角關係" (Viva Love - It's Complicated version) by Chang Chung Li - instrumental
8. "明日～掛居的失眠夜" (Tomorrow - Insomnia version) - instrumental
9. "悲傷～再見了，松崗!" (Wound - Goodbye version) - instrumental
10. "悲傷～星華的回憶與想念!" (Wound Memory version) by Chang Chung Li - instrumental
11. "啟程演奏版～擦乾眼淚的約定" (Journey - Tears version) by Chang Chung Li - instrumental
12. "明日～瞿守的默默守候" (Tomorrow - Silently version) - instrumental
13. "說再見" (Saying Goodbye) by Rainie Yang
14. "有你真好" You Ni Zhen Hao [Good To Have You] by Rainie Yang and Christine Fan - ending theme
15. "有你真好演奏版～ 謝謝你，明日會的伙伴們!" (Good To Have You - Thank You version) - instrumental

Bonus tracks

1. "愛情萬歲加長版" (Viva Love extended version) by Chang Chung Li - instrumental
2. "明日原味版" (Tomorrow extended version) by Chang Chung Li - instrumental
3. "啟程鋼琴演奏版" (Journey Piano version) - instrumental

== Books ==
- Tomorrow Diary (愛情白皮書Diary) by Yan Feng Zhu published on 26 April 2002 by Jian Duan
- Tomorrow TV Drama Novel (愛情白皮書電視小說) by Zhong Ling published on 1 January 2002 by Sharp Point
- Tomorrow Book (愛情白皮書 - 戀人絮語) by Zhong Ling published on 1 January 2002 by Sharp Point
- Tomorrow Book (愛情白皮書－偶像應援書) by Zhong Ling published on 18 August 2002 by Jian Duan
