= Chen Yufan =

Chinese actor and singer

- 陈羽凡
- Born: Chen Tao (陈涛); November 18, 1975 (age 50); Beijing, China
- Education: Beijing Food College
- Occupations: Actor, singer
- Years active: 1996-present
- Agent(s): Beijing Master Culture Development Co., Ltd.
- Spouse: Bai Baihe (m. 2006–2015)
- Children: 1
- Musical career
- Genres: Mandopop
- Instrument: Guitar
- Member of: Yu Quan

Chinese name
- Traditional Chinese: 陳羽凡
- Simplified Chinese: 陈羽凡
Transcriptions
Standard Mandarin
- Hanyu Pinyin: Chén Yǔfán

Chen Yufan (Chinese: 陈羽凡; born 18 November 1975) is a Chinese actor and singer of the pop duo Yu Quan.

== Early life and education ==
Chen was born Chen Tao (Chinese: 陈涛; pinyin: Chén Tāo) in Beijing, on November 18, 1975. He graduated from Beijing Food College (北京粮食专科学校).

== Career ==
In 1994, Chen dropped out of school and started his career as a singer-songwriter. That same year, Hu Haiquan, who started composing at 11, came to Beijing from Northeast China and played keyboard for bands. In 1996, the two met for the first time and formed a band named "Yu Quan".

On November 17, 1998, he was assigned to Rock Records Co., Ltd. with Hu Haiquan, who joined the Yu Quan musical group. Their debut album, The Most Beautiful, was released on November 10, 1999, and sales exceeded one million. Their 2nd album, titled Callous to the End, was released in 2000. Their 3rd album, titled Ardently Love, was released in 2001. In the next few years, their released a member of music albums, such as I can't Live without You (2003), Thirty (2005), Friends are Difficult (2006), Everyone Has a Yu Quan in His Heart (2009), @Myself (2011), Regenerate (2013), Dare to Love (2014), Recalcitrate (2015).

== Personal life ==
Chen married Bai Baihe on December 26, 2006. They first met while appearing in a Chinese romantic comedy television series Bloom of Youth in 2004. Their son, Chen Shengtong, was born on January 19, 2008. On April 16, 2017, Bai Baihe announced that they divorced at the end of 2015.

=== Drug scandal ===
On November 26, 2018, Chen was arrested by the Beijing Municipal Public Security Bureau for drug use and illegal possession of drugs. Chen's brokerage company responded that it was a rumor and would hold the rumor-maker criminally liable. But on November 28, the Sina Weibo account "Ping'an Shijingshan", the official Sina Weibo account of the Shijingshan branch of the Beijing Municipal Public Security Bureau, announced that two people had been arrested on November 26 for drug use and illegal possession of drugs in Beijing. It concealed their real names but disclosed their surnames as Chen and He. The one named Chen was said to be male, aged 43, a singer. In the afternoon, "Ping'an Beijing", the official Sina Weibo account of the Beijing Municipal Public Security Bureau, reposted the announcement from its Shijingshan branch, and commented, "Drugs make the 'Most Beautiful' wither" (Chinese: 情况通报：毒品让“最美”凋零). The "Most Beautiful" was the debut album released by the band "Yu Quan" in 1999. Later, the official Sina Weibo of People's Daily reposted the announcement from Shijingshan branch of the Beijing Municipal Public Security Bureau and posted the photo of Chen Yufan. This confirms the fact that he took drugs. Chen's brokerage company subsequently issued an apology letter.

== Filmography ==
=== Film ===
Year	English title	Chinese title	Role	Notes
2005	Waiting Alone	独自等待	Himself	
2011	Love Is Not Blind	失恋33天	guest	
2011	Lee's Adventures	李献计历险记	A villager	
2012		敢想敢为	Himself	
2015	Forever Young	栀子花开	Boss of the bar	
2015	Jian Bing Man	煎饼侠	Himself	

=== Television ===
Year	English title	Chinese title	Role	Notes
1996	Summer in Beijing	北京夏天	Tao Bei'er	
2006	Bloom of Youth	与青春有关的日子	Xu Xun	
