= Five Years =

Five Years may refer to:

== Music ==
=== Albums ===
- Five Years (1969–1973), a 2015 compilation album by David Bowie
- Five Years: Singles, a 2001 compilation album by Takako Matsu
- 5 Years (album), a 2010 album by Kaela Kimura

=== Songs ===
- "Five Years" (David Bowie song), a song by David Bowie from the 1972 album Ziggy Stardust
- "5 Years" (Björk song), a song by Björk from the 1997 album Homogenic
- "Five Years", a song by Bo Burnham from the 2022 album The Inside Outtakes

== Other ==
- Five Years (book), a 1966 autobiographical collection of American social critic Paul Goodman's notebooks
- Five Years, a 2019 series by Terry Moore

== See also ==
- "Five Long Years", a 1952 song by blues vocalist/pianist Eddie Boyd
- Five-year plan (disambiguation)
- Lustrum, a term for a five-year period in Ancient Rome.
