= Honami Suzuki =

Japanese actress (born 1966)

- Born: August 14, 1966 (age 60); Tokyo, Japan
- Occupation: Actress
- Years active: 1986–present
- Spouses: Kazuhito Kawai (m. 1994; div. 1997); Takaaki Ishibashi (m. 1998; div. 2021)
- Children: 3

Honami Suzuki (鈴木 保奈美, Suzuki Honami; born 14 August 1966) is a Japanese actress.

== Career ==
Suzuki began acting after high school and debuted at age 19 in the television drama Asobi Ja Nai No Yo, Kono Koi Wa (TBS, 1986).

Her breakthrough came in 1991 with the role of Rika in the Fuji TV television adaptation of Fumi Saimon's manga Tokyo Love Story. The scholar Alisa Freedman has said that "Tokyo Love Story grabbed media and viewer attention because of the main character Rika", and the show made Suzuki famous at home and in Asia.

She married the comedian Takaaki Ishibashi in 1998, and dropped out of show business in 1999 after giving birth to a daughter. She resumed her acting career with the NHK Taiga drama Gō (2011).

== Selected filmography ==
=== Television ===
Year	Title	Role	Notes	Ref.
1986	Asobi Ja Nai No Yo, Kono Koi Wa			
1988	Non-chan no Yume	Misao Nakamoto	Asadora	
1989	Shiratori Reiko de Gozaimasu!	Reiko Shiratori	Lead role	
1991	Tokyo Love Story	Rika Akana	Lead role	
1992	In the Name of Love	Takako Fujiki	Lead role	
1996	Furuhata Ninzaburō	Noriko Kendall	Episode 23	
1997	Sōrito Yobanaide			
1998	News no Onna	Tamaki Aso	Lead role	
1999	Genroku Ryōran	Someko	Taiga drama	
2011	Gō	Oichi/narrator	Taiga drama	
2013	The Family Game	Kayoko Numata		
2013	Legal High		Episode 6	
2014	Smoking Gun	Maki Chiyoda		
2017	Samurai Gourmet			
2017–2018	Laugh It Up!		Asadora	
2018–2020	Suits	Chika Yukimura	2 seasons	
2019	Ōoku the Final	Ten'ei-in	TV movie	
2020	A Girl of 35	Tae Tokioka		
2021	Influence	Tomomi Oikawa		
2023	Fixer	Nahoko Sugitani	Season 2	
2025	Private Banker	Kumiko Iida		
2025	Scandal Eve	Yoko Kodama		

=== Films ===
Year	Title	Role	Notes	Ref.
1989	Fancy Dance			
1995	Hero Interview		Lead role	
1997	Lie Lie Lie	Misaki Ui		
2000	Ichigensan	Kyōko Nakamura		
2012	The Floating Castle	Tama		
2013	Platinum Data			
2016	Kanon	Mitsuko Harashima		
2021	Detective Chinatown 3	Yoshiko Kawamura	Chinese film	
2021	Perfect Strangers	Eri		
2021	Asakusa Kid	Mari Fukami		
2023	Don't Call It Mystery: The Movie	Nanae Kariatsumari		

== Awards ==
Year	Award	Category	Work(s)	Result	Ref.
1990	14th Elan d'or Awards	Newcomer of the Year	Herself	Won	
1992	1st TV Life Annual Drama Awards	Best Actress	Tokyo Love Story	Won	
2014	23rd TV Life Annual Drama Awards	Best Supporting Actress	The Family Game	Won	
