= Eddie Peng =

Taiwanese-Canadian actor, singer and model

- 彭于晏
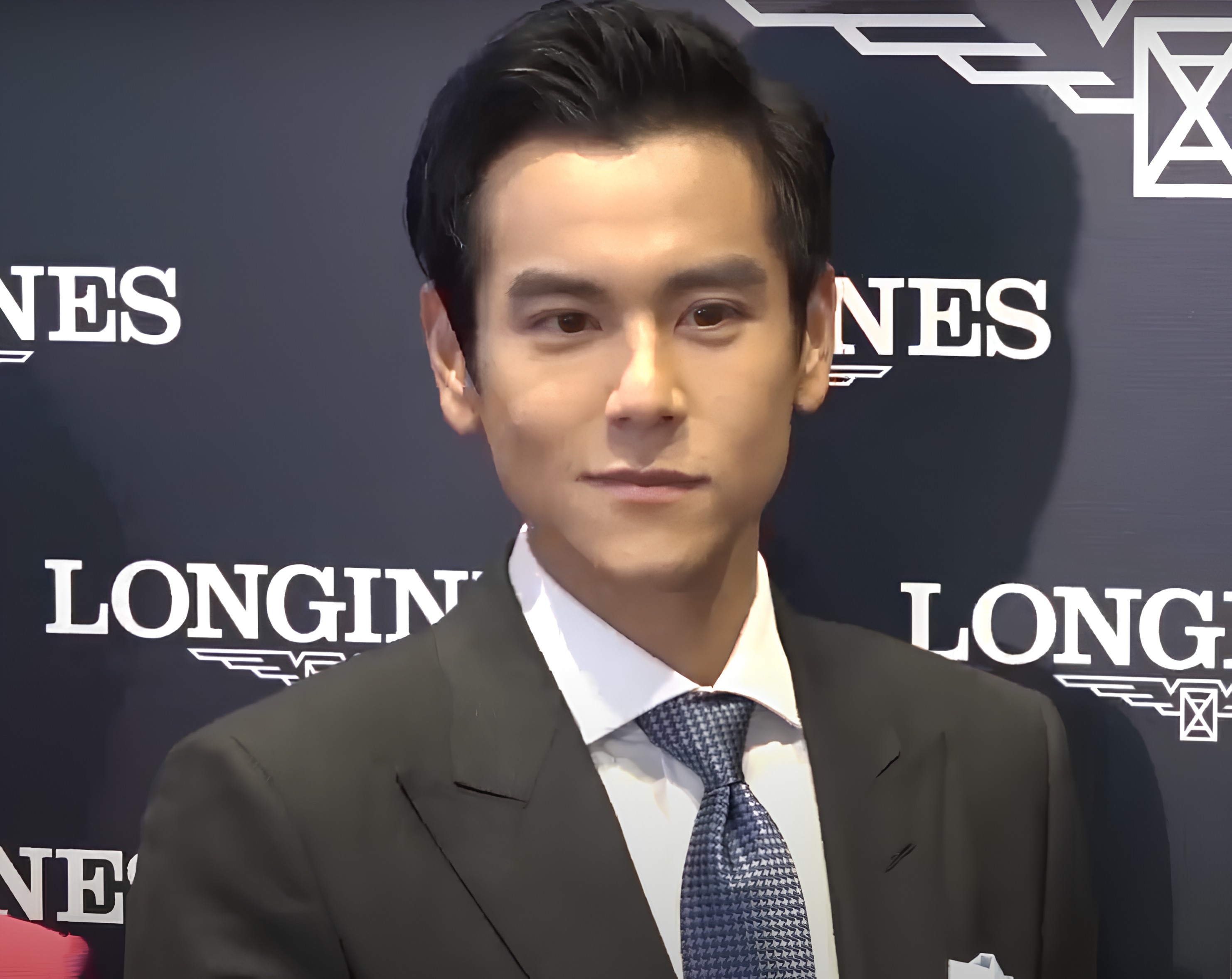
- Peng in 2018
- Born: 24 March 1982 (age 44); Penghu, Taiwan
- Education: University of British Columbia
- Occupations: Actor; singer; model
- Years active: 2002–present
- Musical career
- Genre: Mandopop

Chinese name
- Chinese: 彭于晏
Transcriptions
Standard Mandarin
- Hanyu Pinyin: Péngyúyàn
Yue: Cantonese
- Jyutping: Paang4 Jyu1 Aan3
Southern Min
- Hokkien POJ: Phêⁿ Û-àn

Edward Peng Yu-Yan (Chinese: 彭于晏; pinyin: Péng Yúyàn; Pe̍h-ōe-jī: Phêⁿ Û-àn; born 24 March 1982) is a Taiwanese actor, singer and model. He is best known for starring in the films Hear Me (2009), Unbeatable (2013), Fleet of Time (2014), Operation Mekong (2016), Duckweed (2017), Wu Kong (2017), and Hidden Man (2018). In 2024, Peng starred in Black Dog, which premiered at the 77th Cannes Film Festival and won the Un Certain Regard prize.

== Early life and education ==
Peng was born in Penghu, Taiwan. He moved to Vancouver, British Columbia, Canada at the age of thirteen. In 2000, he graduated from Sir Winston Churchill Secondary School. Subsequently, he was admitted to the University of British Columbia and majored in economics, but later dropped out to begin his acting career.

== Career ==
=== 2002–2008: Beginnings ===
Peng began his career when he was cast as in Tomorrow by director Yang Daqing during a summer vacation in Taiwan. The drama is adapted from the Japanese manga series Asunaro Hakusho, written by Fumi Saimon. Peng built a teenage fan following after the romantic comedy gained popularity. In 2003, he took on his first leading role in the Taiwanese drama Scent of Love, which tells the story of two star-crossed lovers who transcend life and death to find one another in their many reincarnations.

In 2005, he starred in the idol drama When Dolphin Met Cat, portraying an autistic youth. To prepare himself for the filming, Peng took one month to learn how to interact with dolphins from a trained instructor. He then starred in Chinese xianxia drama Chinese Paladin and wuxia drama The Young Warriors, which were extremely popular during their run and led to increased recognition for him in the Mainland.

Thereafter, Peng made his big screen debut in the movie Exit No.6 (2006), directed by Yu-Hsien Lin. The film put him on the radar of many film directors, including Tsui Hark who cast him in his 2008 romantic comedy, All About Women. In 2007, Peng was nominated as Best New Actor at the 44th Golden Horse Film Festival and Awards for his performance in My DNA Says I Love You.

=== 2009–2010: Contractual disputes ===
In 2009, Peng was involved in a contract dispute lawsuit against his former manager, reaching the nadir of his career. However, during this period, Peng starred in the movie Hear Me, directed by Fen-Fen Cheng, about a delivery boy who falls for a deaf girl and communicates with her using sign language.The film was released a week prior to the opening of the 21st Summer Deaflympics, and became the highest grossing locally produced movie at Taiwan's box office.

After winning the lawsuit in 2010, he released his debut EP titled It Has To Be You, which featured 5 songs under the management of Avex Group.

The same year, he starred as the male lead in the movie Close to You. To portray his role as a boxer, Peng trained for three months prior to filming. He was nominated in the Best Actor category at the 2nd Macau International Movie Festival for his performance.

=== 2011–2013: Rising popularity ===
Peng achieved breakthrough with his performance in the 2011 teen film Jump Ashin!, directed by Yu-Hsien Lin. He reportedly trained eight months to portray an athlete. The film was a critical and commercial success. Peng earned nominations as Best Actor at the 48th Golden Horse Film Festival and 13th Taipei Film Festival, which marked the turning point of his career.

Thereafter, he starred in romance films Love You You and Love; police thriller Cold War; kungfu comedy Tai Chi 0 and Tai Chi Hero; showcasing his versatility.

In 2013, Peng starred in action film Unbeatable, playing a mixed martial arts fighter. Peng practised boxing for four hours a day for his character. Unbeatable was the highest grossing local production at the Hong Kong box office, and received positive reviews. The film earned Peng nominations as Best Supporting Actor at the 33rd Hong Kong Film Award and 50th Golden Horse Film Festival and Awards. The same year, Peng starred in romantic comedy A Wedding Invitation alongside Bai Baihe. The film earned nearly 200 million yuan ($32 million) in China, making it the highest-grossing Chinese-South Korean production.

=== 2014–present: Box office success ===
In 2014, Peng was cast as Wong Fei-hung in Rise of the Legend, the latest film about the iconic Kung-Fu master. He reportedly practiced 10 hours of martial arts every day to prepare for the role. Peng was nominated in the Best Actor category at the 34th Hong Kong Film Award. The same year, he starred in historical drama Sound of the Desert and coming-of-age film Fleet of Time, which were both commercial successes. Peng's achievements in both the film and television industry brought his career to a new height.

In 2015, Peng played a professional cyclist in sports film To the Fore. He reportedly received training and earned qualifications for competitive racing during filming. The film was selected to represent Hong Kong in the best foreign-language film category at the 88th Academy Awards. Peng was also appointed the first Chinese Goodwill Ambassador of the 2015 Tour de France. The same year, Peng starred alongside Shu Qi in romance film The Last Women Standing.

Peng achieved another breakthrough in 2016 with the film Operation Mekong, where he portrayed a hardcore undercover agent along with veteran actor Zhang Hanyu. The film received critical acclaim, and is highest grossing Chinese cop film to date. He also starred in romance film Run for Love alongside Zhang Ziyi, police thriller Cold War 2 as an antagonist, war epic Call of Heroes, and Zhang Yimou's historical epic The Great Wall.

In 2017, Peng co-starred in Han Han's film Duckweed alongside Deng Chao and Zanilia Zhao. The sleeper hit gained commercial and critical success. He then starred in war film Our Time Will Come directed by Ann Hui, playing a complicated anti-hero. Peng then headlined his first film, fantasy epic Wu Kong where he played the title character. The film was a box office success and grossed US$100 million at the box office.

In 2018, Peng stars in the wuxia film Hidden Man, directed by Jiang Wen.

In 2020, Peng starred in The Rescue, a thriller film directed by Dante Lam which focuses on an emergency rescue operative. He is also set to star in period romance film Love After Love, directed by Ann Hui.

== Personal life ==
Eddie Peng and Jolin Tsai reportedly began dating in mid-2006, but their relationship remained private until March 2007, when Tsai was spotted visiting Peng's home late at night to "play video games." Due to strong opposition from Peng's agency, the couple eventually parted ways in 2009. Displeased with the interference, Peng attempted to terminate his contract with his agency early, which led to him being sidelined and his career stalling until the success of Jump Ashin!, after which he moved his career focus from Taiwan to mainland China.

In 2015, Peng dated Taiwanese actress Lyla Lin.

While filming Black Dog, Peng developed such a strong bond with his dog co-star Xin that he adopted him.

== Controversy ==
On June 17, 2018, at the Weibo Movie Night, Eddie Peng, who was supposed to be seated in the second row, allegedly took a first-row seat intended for Li Bingbing, angering the actress to the point that she refused to enter the ceremony until she was called on stage to receive her award. On July 17, during an interview with ifeng.com, Peng was asked if the “seat-swapping” controversy had affected him, to which he responded, “I have done nothing to be ashamed of.” Later that day, Peng's office issued a statement clarifying that the seat changes were made without his knowledge and criticized ifeng.com for misrepresenting the interview. The website apologized and released the unedited transcript, showing that the original question referred to "misunderstandings online" without directly mentioning the “seat-swapping.”

After this incident, Peng significantly slowed down his career. A plot point in the trailer for 2023 film The Movie Emperor was inspired by this event, although the scene was cut from the theater version.

== Filmography ==
=== Film ===
Year	English title	Original title	Role/Ref.
2005	A Record	记录	Ah Xiang
2006	Open To Midnight	午夜照相馆	A Hai
2007	Muddy but Pure White	泥巴色的纯白	Tang Xuchuan
2007	Exit No. 6	六号出口	Fan Dayin
2007	My DNA Says I Love You	基因决定我爱你	Xiao Xiong
2008	Sleeplessness All Through the Night	公主在台北彻夜未眠	Gong Ping
2008	All About Women	女人不坏	Mo Qiyan
2008	My So Called Love	爱的发声练习	A Liang
2009	Hear Me	听说	Tian Kuo
2010	Lover's Discourse	恋人絮语	Li Guangsheng
2010	Close to You	近在咫尺的爱恋	Zhao Dajie
2011	Love You You	夏日樂悠悠	You Lele
2011	Jump Ashin!	翻滚吧!阿信	Ashin
2012	LOVE	爱	Ah Kai
2012	Tai Chi 0	太極1：從零開始	Fang Zijing
2012	Tai Chi Hero	太極2：英雄崛起	Fang Zijing
2012	Cold War	寒戰	Joe Lee
2013	A Wedding Invitation	分手合約	Li Xing
2013	Unbeatable	激戰	Lin Siqi
2014	Rise of the Legend	黄飛鴻之英雄有夢	Wong Fei-hung
2014	Fleet of Time	匆匆那年	Chen Xun
2015	12 Golden Ducks	12金鸭	Cameo
2015	To the Fore	破風	Qiu Ming
2015	The Last Women Standing	剩者為王	Ma Sai
2016	Run for Love	奔愛	Feng Yujian
2016	The Bodyguard	我的特工爺爺	Cameo
2016	Cold War 2	寒戰2	Joe Lee
2016	Call of Heroes	危城歼霸	Ma Feng
2016	Operation Mekong	湄公河行動	Fang Xinwu
2016	The Great Wall	長城	General Wu
2017	Duckweed	乘風破浪	Xu Zhengtai
2017	Wu Kong	悟空傳	Sun Wukong
2017	Our Time Will Come	明月幾時有	Liu Heizai
2018	Hidden Man	邪不压正	Li Tianran
2019	Midnight Diner	深夜食堂	Guest appearance
2020	The Rescue	紧急救援	Gao Qian
2021	Love After Love	第一炉香	Qiao Qiqia
2021	Are You Lonesome Tonight?	热带往事	Wang Xueming
2023	I Did It My Way	潛行	Eddie Fong
2024	Black Dog	狗阵	Lang
2026	Busted Water Pipes	爆水管	Yu Dahai
2027	Jason Statham Stole My Bike	—N/a	TBA

=== Television series ===
Year	English title	Original title	Role/Ref.
2002	Tomorrow	愛情白皮書	Xu Shouzhi
2003	Scent of Love	恋香	Jin Chengtian
2005	I Only Care About You	我只在乎你	Lin Qingyun
2005	Chinese Paladin	仙劍奇侠傳	Tang Yu
2005	When Dolphin Met Cat	海豚愛上猫	Xu Wei
2006	The Young Warriors	少年楊家將	Yang Yansi /Qilang
2007	Wayward Kenting	我在墾丁*天氣晴	Zhong Hanwen
2007	Liao Zhai	聊齋誌異2	Yang Yuedan
2008	Honey and Clover	蜂蜜四叶草	Ren Sentian
2009	The Concerto	协奏曲	Yuan Hao
2010	My Sassy Girl	牵牛的夏天	Jin Qianniu
2014	Sound of the Desert	风中奇缘	Wei Wuji

== Discography ==
=== Extended plays ===
Year	English title	Original title	Released date	Label
2010	It Has to Be You	非愛不可	23 April 2010	Avex Taiwan

=== Soundtrack appearances ===
Year	English title	Original title	Album	Notes/Ref.
2003	"Cannot Reject"	不能拒绝	Scent of Love OST	
2005	"The Sea loves Blue Sky"	大海爱蓝天	When Dolphin Met Cat OST	
2008	"Give Me Love"	—N/a	Honey and Clover OST	with Joe Cheng & Ito Chiaki
2008	"Lucky Clover's Happiness"	幸运草的祝福	Honey and Clover OST	with Clover Band
2013	"Didn't We Agree To It"	我们不是说好了吗	A Wedding Invitation OST	with Bai Baihe
2019	"Crazy Waves"	狂浪	The Rescue OST	

=== Music video appearances ===
Year	Song title	Artist	Notes
2005	"The Most Beautiful" (最美)	Maggie Chiang	
2005	"Happy Together" (春光乍泄)	Maggie Chiang	
2005	"One on One" (一对一)	Fish Leong	
2006	"Searching for Unicorn" (寻找独角兽)	Fiona Sit	
2006	"Lonely Road" (寂寞公路)	Yu Yongbang	
2006	"Chase and Chase Again" (一追再追)	Yu Yongbang	
2007	"Can't Stop Thinking" (想個不停)	Claire Guo	
2008	"Lucky Clover's Happiness" (幸运草的祝福)	Clover Band	
2008	"Coastal Highway Exit" (沿海公路的出口)	S.H.E	
2008	"Because You Love Me" (因為你愛我)	Joanna Wang	
2010	"Break Up Needs Practice" (分手需要練習的)	A-Lin	

== Bibliography ==
Year	English title	Chinese title
2004	Photos of Lian Xiang	Eddie & Ben 照相簿/恋香全追踪
2005	Eddie Peng's Dolphin Diary	彭于晏的海豚日记
2008	Eddie Peng Ken Ding 15x6	彭于晏 垦丁15x6

== Accolades ==
=== Awards and nominations ===
Film awards
Year	Award	Category	Nominated work	Result
2007	44th Golden Horse Film Festival and Awards	Best New Performer	My DNA Says I Love You	Nominated
2010	2nd Macau International Movie Festival	Best Actor	Close to You	Nominated
2011	13th Taipei Film Festival	Best Actor	Jump Ashin!	Nominated
2011	48th Golden Horse Film Festival and Awards	Best Actor	Jump Ashin!	Nominated
2012	12th Chinese Film Media Awards	Most Anticipated Actor	Jump Ashin!	Nominated
2012	11th Changchun Film Festival	Best Actor	Jump Ashin!	Nominated
2013	13th Chinese Film Media Awards	Most Anticipated Performance	Cold War	Nominated
2013	50th Golden Horse Film Festival and Awards	Best Supporting Actor	Unbeatable	Nominated
2014	14th Chinese Film Media Awards	Most Anticipated Performance	Unbeatable	Nominated
2014	33rd Hong Kong Film Award	Best Supporting Actor	Unbeatable	Nominated
2014	12th Changchun Film Festival	Best Supporting Actor	Unbeatable	Nominated
2014	32nd Hundred Flowers Awards	Best Newcomer	Cold War	Nominated
2015	15th Chinese Film Media Awards	Most Anticipated Performance	Rise of the Legend	Nominated
2015	34th Hong Kong Film Award	Best Actor	Rise of the Legend	Nominated
2015	7th Macau International Movie Festival	Best Actor	To the Fore	Nominated
2016	16th Chinese Film Media Awards	Most Anticipated Actor	To the Fore	Nominated
2017	24th Beijing College Student Film Festival	Best Actor	Operation Mekong	Nominated
2017	20th Shanghai International Film Festival	Best Actor	Our Time Will Come	Nominated
2017	9th Macau International Movie Festival	Best Actor	Wu Kong	Nominated
2018	12th Asian Film Awards	Best Supporting Actor	Our Time Will Come	Nominated
2018	9th China Film Director's Guild Awards	Best Actor	Duckweed	Nominated
2018	23rd Huading Awards	Best Actor	Our Time Will Come	Nominated
2018	10th Macau International Movie Festival	Best Actor	Hidden Man	Nominated
2025	18th Asian Film Awards	Best Actor	Black Dog	Nominated
Television awards
2006	41st Golden Bell Awards	Best Supporting Actor	I Only Care About You	Nominated
2008	43rd Golden Bell Awards	Best Actor	Wayward Kenting	Nominated
2012	8th Huading Awards	Best Actor (Youth Drama)	My Sassy Girl	Nominated
Music awards
2010	12th TVB8 Mandarin Music On Demand Awards Presentation	Best New Singer (Gold Award)	It Has to Be You	Won
2012	11th CCTV-MTV Music Award Ceremony	Most Popular Promising Singer (Hong Kong/Taiwan)	It Has to Be You	Nominated
Others
2010	7th Esquire Man at His Best Awards	Popular Male Artist of the Year (Hong Kong/Taiwan)	—N/a	Won
2011	3rd Yahoo Asia Buzz Awards	Most Popular Film Actor	—N/a	Won
2012	9th Esquire Man at His Best Awards	Artist of the Year	—N/a	Won

=== Forbes China Celebrity 100 ===
Year	Rank	Ref.
2014	75th	
2015	87th	
2017	47th	
2019	38th	
2020	94th	
