= Fleet of Time =

2014 Chinese youth romance film

- Theatrical poster
- Directed by: Zhang Yibai
- Written by: Han Li; Han Liu; Yehui Jiu
- Based on: Cong Cong Na Nian by Jiu Ye Hui
- Produced by: Wayne Wei Jiang; Jianlin Jing; Li Li; Xiaoping Li; Vivian Shen; Qinan Wang; You Wu; Allen Zhu
- Starring: Eddie Peng; Ni Ni; Zheng Kai; Vision Wei; Zhang Zixuan
- Cinematography: Bingqiang Li
- Edited by: Jinlei Kong; Fang Qian
- Music by: Kubert Leung
- Production company: Beijing Gallop Horse Film & TV Production
- Release date: December 5, 2014 (China)
- Running time: 119 minutes
- Country: China
- Language: Mandarin
- Box office: ¥590.6 million (China)

Fleet of Time (Chinese: 匆匆那年; pinyin: Cōngcōng Nà Nián), also known as Back in Time is a 2014 Chinese coming-of-age film directed by Zhang Yibai and starring Eddie Peng, Ni Ni, Zheng Kai, Vision Wei and Zhang Zixuan. The film is adapted from the popular novel of the same name by Chinese writer Jiu Ye Hui. On 4 August 2014, the television adaptation Back in Time premiered on Sohu.

== Plot ==
A coming of age tale of a group of close friends as they experience high school, college and eventually adulthood through the '90s and 2000s. They meet again at a friend's wedding in 2014, and recalls their romantic past through memories.

== Cast ==
- Eddie Peng as Chen Xun
- Ni Ni as Fang Hui
- Zheng Kai as Zhao Ye
- Vision Wei as Qiao Ran
- Zhang Zixuan
- Chen He as Su Kai
- Yanting Ma
- Cya Liu
- Bi Xia as Shen Xiaotang

== Theme song ==
- "Cong Cong Na Nian" (匆匆那年)
  - Lyrics: Lin Xi
  - Music: Kubert Leung
  - Singer: Faye Wong
