= Bai Baihe =

Chinese actress (born 1984)

Bai Bai He
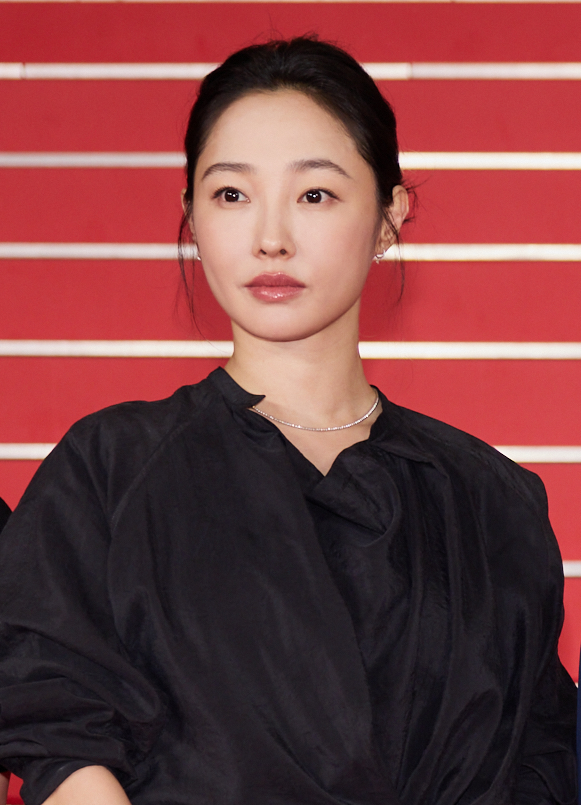
- Bai at the 30th Busan International Film Festival in 2025
- Born: Bai Xue (白雪); 1 March 1984 (age 42); Qingdao, Shandong, China
- Education: Central Academy of Drama
- Occupation: Actress
- Years active: 2004–present
- Agent: Bai Baihe Studio
- Spouse: Chen Yufan (m. 2006; div. 2015)
- Children: Chen Shengtong
- Awards: Hundred Flowers Awards – Best Actress

Bai Baihe (Chinese: 白百何; pinyin: Bái Bǎihé, born 1 March 1984) is a Chinese actress. She is best known for her roles in films Love Is Not Blind (2011), Personal Tailor (2013), Monster Hunt (2015), and Go Away Mr. Tumor (2015), as well as the television series Surgeons (2017) and Sunshine by My Side (2023).

== Early life ==
Bai Baihe was born in Qingdao, Shandong. She attended the Wendeng Road Elementary School. At a young age, Bai shown talents in singing, dancing and acting. At the age of 12, she was admitted into the Beijing Dance Academy. In 2000, Bai auditioned for a role in Zhang Yimou's film Happy Times. Even though she was not selected, Zhang saw potential in her and recommended her to apply for the Central Academy of Drama; which Bai eventually got admitted to in 2002.

== Career ==
Shortly after her graduation from the Central Academy of Drama, Bai made her acting debut in the television series Bloom of Youth (2006). She continued to appear in dramas such as Where Is Happiness (2007) and My Youthfulness (2009).

Bai achieved breakthrough with the 2011 romantic-comedy Love Is Not Blind, also starring Wen Zhang. The low-budget film became a surprise hit at the Chinese box office. Bai won the Best Actress award at the Hundred Flowers Award. The following year, she starred in spy drama Fu Chen and was nominated at the Shanghai Television Festival for Best Actress.

Bai then starred in Feng Xiaogang's comedy film Personal Tailor (2013), which broke box office records on its opening day. The same year, Bai starred in romantic comedy A Wedding Invitation alongside Eddie Peng. The film was a commercial success and critics praise Bai for "keeping a character that could easily slip into shrill and childish far from that quagmire". Bai followed up with romantic drama film The Stolen Years, where she received rave reviews and was coined "mainland Chinese romance-drama royalty".

Bai solidified her status as China's Box Office Queen with the 2015 fantasy-comedy film Monster Hunt, directed by Raman Hui. The film grossed over 1.8 billion yuan to become the second highest-grossing film in China. She then starred in romantic comedy film Go Away Mr. Tumor, which was selected as the Chinese entry for the Best Foreign Language Film at the 88th Academy Awards Bai won the Best Actress award at the China Film Director's Guild Awards, Beijing Student Film Festival and Huabiao Awards for her performance as a cartoonist who battles against cancer with an optimistic mind.

Bai topped the list of "Highest Grossing Actresses in China" for 2015, after having ranked 2nd in 2013. Variety describes her as the "pretty girl next door with decent acting chops and good comic timing".

In 2016, Bai starred alongside Chen Kun in crime caper film Chongqing Hot Pot. The film received acclaim and positive word-of-mouth, grossing 152 million yuan in four days. She then featured in romance film I Belonged to You, which broke box office sales record for mainland-produced romance films.

In 2017, Bai starred in action cop thriller The Missing, directed by Xu Jinglei. The same year, she filmed two television productions - medical drama Surgeons and the romance series Only Side by Side with You.

In 2018, Bai reprised her role in the sequel of Monster Hunt. The film set the record for the highest box office day for a single market. The same year, she starred in First Night Nerves, a women-centric film directed by Stanley Kwan.

In 2019, Bai starred in the drama film A City Called Macau, adapted from Geling Yan's novel of the same name and directed by Li Shaohong. Bai was nominated for the Best Actress award at the Golden Rooster Awards for her performance. The same year, she starred in the drama film Begin, Again. She starred in the 2019 romantic comedy film A Boyfriend for My Girlfriend alongside Wu Xiubo.

== Personal life ==
Bai was married to singer and actor Chen Yufan on 26 December 2006. They first met while appearing in a Chinese romantic comedy television series Bloom of Youth in 2004. Their son was born on 19 January 2008. On 16 April 2017, Bai announced that they had divorced at the end of 2015.

== Filmography ==
=== Film ===
Year	English title	Chinese title	Role	Notes/Ref.
2011	The Law of Attraction	万有引力	Shi Xiaolin	
2011	Love Is Not Blind	失恋33天	Huang Xiaoxian	
2012	First Time	第一次	Wei Jiajia	
2013	A Wedding Invitation	分手合约	Qiao Qiao	
2013	The Stolen Years	被偷走的那五年	He Man	
2013	Personal Tailor	私人订制	Xiao Biao	
2014	The Truth About Beauty	整容日记	Guo Jing	
2015	Monster Hunt	捉妖记	Huo Xiaolan	
2015	Go Away Mr. Tumor	滚蛋吧！肿瘤君	Xiong Dun	
2015	Cities in Love	恋爱中的城市	Yan Ran	
2015	Les Aventures d'Anthony	陪安东尼度过漫长岁月	Xiao Ying	
2016	Chongqing Hot Pot	火锅英雄	Yu Xiaohui	
2016	I Belonged to You	从你的全世界路过	Li Zhi	
2017	The Missing	绑架者	Lin Wei	
2018	Monster Hunt 2	捉妖记2	Huo Xiaolan	
2018	First Night Nerves	八个女人一台戏	Fu Sha	
2019	A City Called Macau	媽閣是座城	Mei Xiao'ou	
2019	Begin, Again	亲爱的新年好	Shu Jin	
2019	A Boyfriend for My Girlfriend	情圣2	Tian Xin	
2021	The Door Lock	门锁	Fang Hui	
2023	The Procurator	检察风云	Tong Yuchen	
2025	Gloaming in Luomu	罗目的黄昏	Xiao Bai	
2025	Mothertongue	春树	Haruki Kata	

=== Television series ===
Year	English title	Chinese title	Role	Notes/Ref.
2006	Bloom of Youth	與青春有關的日子	Qiao Qiao	
2007	Where Is Happiness	幸福在哪里	Gan Lu	
2009	My Youthfulness	我的青春谁做主	Lei Lei	
2010	The Lying Lover	说谎的爱人	Dong Nan	
2011	Family, Power N	家的N次方	Zhao Wen	
2012	Floating and Sinking	浮沉	Qiao Li	
2012	Rules Before a Divorce	离婚前规则	Jiang Xinyao	
2013	Little Big Soldier	大兵小将	Sha Man	
2013	Love Is Not Blind	失恋33天		Cameo
2013	Jinan City Is our Hometown	我们这拨人	Qiao Qiao	
2015	Grow Up	长大	Ye Chunmeng	
2017	Surgeons	外科风云	Lu Chenxi	
2018	Only Side by Side with You	南方有乔木	Nan Qiao	
2019	How Are You?	好世謀	Ya Hui	
2020	New Face	焕脸		Producer
2020	Hear Her	听见她说	Jingfen	
2022	Modern Marriage	我们的婚姻	Shen Huixing	
2022	My Superhero	欢迎光临	Zheng Youen	
2022	Our Ten Years	我们这十年	Chen Ran	
2023	Sunshine by My Side	骄阳伴我	Jian Bing	
2024		好团圆	Xiang Qian	
2024	Riverside Code at Qingming Festival	清明上河图密码	Wen Yue	

== Discography ==
Year	English title	Chinese title	Album	Notes
2006	"The Past Can Only Be Reminisced"	往事只能回味	Bloom of Youth OST	
2006	"Straw Hat Song"	草帽歌	Bloom of Youth OST	
2009	"I Am Not An Easy Girl"	我不是随便的花朵	My Youthfulness OST	
2010	"Brushing Past Each Other"	擦肩而过	The Lying Lover OST	
2012	"Really Love You"	真的爱你	First Time OST	
2012	"Fu Chen"	浮沉	Fu Chen OST	
2012	"An Ordinary Love"	平凡相恋	—N/a	with Chen Yufan
2013	"Didn't We Agree To It"	我们不是说好了吗	A Wedding Invitation OST	with Eddie Peng
2015	"A Young Girl's Planting Flower Diary"	中二少女养花记	Go Away Mr. Tumor OST	
2015	"Where Will You Be Tomorrow"	明天你会在哪里	Monster Hunt OST	with Jing Boran

== Awards and nominations ==
Year	Award	Category	Nominated work	Result	Ref.
2012	19th Beijing Student Film Festival	Best Actress	Love Is Not Blind	Nominated	
2012	3rd China Film Director's Guild Awards	Best Actress	Love Is Not Blind	Nominated	
2012	12th Chinese Film Media Awards	Most Anticipated Actress	Love Is Not Blind	Nominated	
2012	31st Hundred Flowers Award	Best Actress	Love Is Not Blind	Won	
2012	49th Golden Horse Film Festival and Awards	Best Leading Actress	Love Is Not Blind	Nominated	
2012	7th Chinese Young Generation Film Forum Awards	Best New Actress	Love Is Not Blind	Won	
2012	8th Huading Awards	Best Actress (Contemporary Drama)	Floating and Sinking	Nominated	
2013	19th Shanghai Television Festival	Best Actress	Floating and Sinking	Nominated	
2013	16th Shanghai International Film Festival	Best Actress	The Stolen Years	Nominated	
2013	5th China Image Film Festival	Best Actress	Love Is Not Blind	Nominated	
2013	15th Huabiao Awards	Outstanding Actress	Love Is Not Blind	Nominated	
2014	12th Huading Awards	Best Actress	Personal Tailor	Nominated	
2015	12th Guangzhou Student Film Festival	Most Popular Actress	Monster Hunt	Won	
2016	28th Hong Kong Society of Cinematographers Awards	Most Charismatic Actress	—N/a	Won	
2016	19th Huading Awards	Best Actress	Grow Up	Nominated	
2016	16th Chinese Film Media Awards	Best Actress	Go Away Mr. Tumor	Nominated	
2016	7th China Film Director's Guild Awards	Best Actress	Go Away Mr. Tumor	Won	
2016	6th Beijing International Film Festival	Best Actress	Go Away Mr. Tumor	Nominated	
2016	23rd Beijing Student Film Festival	Best Actress	Go Away Mr. Tumor	Won	
2016	16th Huabiao Awards	Outstanding Actress	Go Away Mr. Tumor	Won	
2016	20th Huading Awards	Best Actress	Go Away Mr. Tumor	Nominated	
2016	3rd Silk Road International Film Festival	Outstanding Contribution Award	—N/a	Won	
2016	33rd Hundred Flowers Award	Best Actress	Monster Hunt	Nominated	
2016	13th Changchun Film Festival	Best Actress	Monster Hunt	Won	
2016	8th International Chinese Film Festival	Best Actress	Chongqing Hot Pot	Won	
2017	31st Golden Rooster Awards	Best Actress	Monster Hunt	Nominated	
2019	32nd Golden Rooster Awards	Best Actress	A City Called Macau	Nominated	
2020	11th China Film Director's Guild Awards	Best Actress	A City Called Macau	Nominated	
