= Ashita, Haru ga Kitara =

Song recorded by Japanese recording artist Takako Matsu

- Original 1997 8cm single cover

Single by Takako Matsu

from the album Sora no Kagami
- B-side: "Zutto... Iyō yo"
- Released: March 21, 1997
- Recorded: January 1997
- Genre: J-pop
- Length: 4:21
- Label: BMG Japan
- Songwriters: Yūji Sakamoto (lyrics); Daisuke Hinata (melody)
- Producer: Daisuke Hinata

Takako Matsu singles chronology
"Ashita, Haru ga Kitara" (1997)	"I Stand Alone" (1997)

"Ashita, Haru ga Kitara" (明日、春が来たら; "Tomorrow, If Spring Comes") is a song by Japanese entertainer Takako Matsu from her debut album, Sora no Kagami (1997). It was released on March 21, 1997, through BMG Japan as her debut single. The song was written by Yūji Sakamoto and Daisuke Hinata, while Hinata produced the song. Following the wrap-up of the drama Long Vacation, she decided to give singing a try upon the suggestion of one of its directors.

The track was recorded in Santa Monica, California, and is a mid-tempo J-pop song composed in the key of B minor. Its lyrics recite a young girl's memories of her love for a boy in her high school days. It has been praised by critics and associated with the onset of spring in Japan, having re-entered the airplay charts in Japan around that time, even years after its initial release. It has also been covered by many other artists like Namie Amuro, Masaharu Fukuyama, Ayumi Shibata, ClariS, and Hiromi Hirata. The single peaked at number 8 on the Oricon singles chart and spent 20 weeks in the top 20 of the chart. It was certified platinum by the Recording Industry Association of Japan (RIAJ) for shipments exceeding 400,000 copies.

Ten years after its initial release, Matsu released a new version of the song titled "Ashita, Haru ga Kitara 97–07" in March 2007. The re-release contains updated lyrics reflecting changes in the artist's mind. By intermixing her vocals with her vocals from 10 years before, the new version contrasts the two. The new version was featured on her album Cherish You (2007) and also on her compilation album Footsteps: 10th Anniversary Complete Best (2008). As of 2014, Matsu has performed the song on all of her concert tours as well as other events, including NHK's Kōhaku Uta Gassen in 1997.

== Background and release ==
Growing up, Takako Matsu practiced piano and took vocal training as a child. Prior to releasing music, she acted in various television drama and plays. In 1996, she acted in the drama Long Vacation, which became very popular in Japan. At the wrap up party of the drama, the director of the series at that time heard her perform karaoke and suggested that she try singing.^{[note]} Although taken aback and hesitant at first, she later agreed, as she felt it was not a chance that everyone received and because she liked singing; she felt it might work out somehow.

"Ashita, Haru ga Kitara" was written by Yūji Sakamoto and Daisuke Hinata, both of whom had worked with Matsu. Sakamoto had been Tokyo Love Story's screenwriter and Hinata had been in charge of the music of Long Vacation. Hinata provided the music and arrangement to "Ashita, Haru ga Kitara". The track was recorded at the Hyper Image Studio in Santa Monica, California, in January 1997. Hinata himself mixed the audio while Steve Hall mastered it. Cagnet provided instrumentation to the song. The record was produced by Kozo Nagayama, who had also produced Long Vacation. Initially, another song was selected to be released as Matsu's debut single. However, it was scrapped for unknown reasons and "Ashita, Haru ga Kitara" was selected instead. Matsu debuted the song on radio on February 14, 1997, and the single was physically released on March 21, 1997, through BMG Japan as an 8 cm CD single.

== Composition ==
"Ashita, Haru ga Kitara" (1997)
A 26-second sample of the song illustrating its production and the lyrics which see a girl recollecting memories of her high school lover. It uses references to baseball such as "winning ball", the "cheers from the stadium", and "spike footprints" (referring to baseball cleats).

"Ashita, Haru ga Kitara" is a mid-tempo J-pop track with a "gentle melody", that lasts for 4 minutes and 13 seconds. According to the original score published by Doremi Music Publishing, it is composed in the key of B minor and in the common verse-chorus song structure with a tempo of 110 beats per minute. The track opens with an instrumental introduction with a chord progression of Gmaj_{7}–F♯m_{7}–Bm. As it reaches the chorus, the progression shifts to G–A–F♯m–Bm_{7}. The same pattern is repeated throughout the song.

The lyrics of the song, written from the perspective of a girl, sees her recollect the memories of her love with a member of her high school baseball team and how she hopes to meet him again "tomorrow, if spring comes". Upon the album's release, Yoshitake Maeda, writing for BMG Japan, commented that Sakamoto probably reminisced on his teenage years through the song.

The b-side of the single "Zutto... Iyō yo" was written by Matsu and produced by Hinata. Matsu decided to give it the theme of three girls going out for a drive. However, she commented that no matter how others looked at it, it seemed as if the song is about two girls. The song opens with an "electro" introduction and utilizes a warped guitar throughout. In addition to the two songs, the single also featured the original karaoke track to "Ashita, Haru ga Kitara". An LP titled Remix Hyper Bug containing remixes of "Ashita, Haru ga Kitara" by DJ Craig William—"Ashita, Haru ga Kitara" (Hyper Bug Mix) and "Ashita, Haru ga Kitara" (Techno Dub Mix) was released on August 21, 1997, through BMG Victor. It also features a remix of the album track "Love Sick", titled "Love Sick (Deep Sick Mix)".

== Reception ==
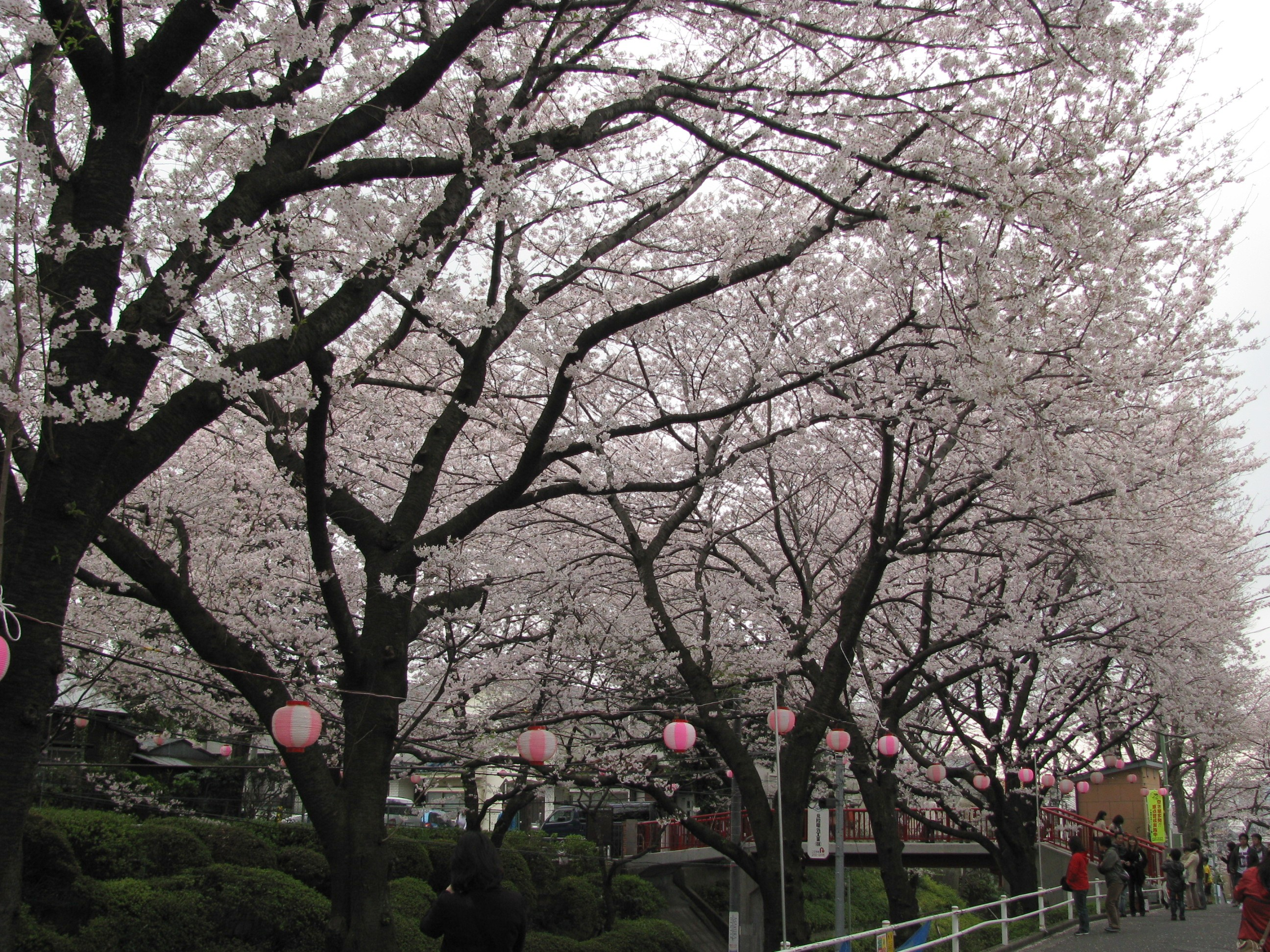
"Ashita, Haru ga Kitara" has often been associated with spring in Japan

A reviewer for CD Journal commended "Ashita, Haru ga Kitara" for being "pure" and noted that Matsu's "unobtrusive [and] naked voice" is like "sitting in a sunny spot on early spring day". Similarly, Rolling Stone Japan wrote that the song has a "heartwarming" production, which they noted has become synonymous with Takako Matsu. Another reviewer for CD Journal said that the b-side, "Zutto... Iyō yo"'s arrangement makes it an "impressive pop song". Since its release, "Ashita, Haru ga Kitara" has often been associated with the onset of spring in Japan. The song also entered the top requests list of many FM radio stations around the same time. Since the introduction of Billboard Japan in 2010, the song has spiked on its airplay charts during the time of spring. It was also included on the compilation True Love: Spring Memorial Songs in 2003. In a web poll conducted in 2013 by MyNavi news asking people about their favorite spring song, "Ashita, Haru ga Kitara" was ranked at number 10.

The single debuted at number 15 on the Oricon singles chart during the week following its release in March 1997, selling 35,640 copies. A few weeks later, it moved to number 8, moving 46,400 copies, which became its peak position. The single spent nine weeks in the top 20, including two in the top 10, and finished at number 75 on the yearly chart, due to sales of 428,170 copies. As of May 2014, it has sold 431,540 copies in Japan and has been certified platinum by the Recording Industry Association of Japan for shipments of over 400,000 copies.^{[note]}

== Live performances and covers ==
In 1997, Matsu performed the song at the 48th Kōhaku Uta Gassen in 1997, representing the "Red" team in the event. The previous year, before her debut as a singer, she had hosted the "Red" team. This made Matsu, who was 19 at that time, the youngest person to reach that position in the event. In June of the same year, she appeared on the show Love Love Aishiteru, her first music talk show appearance, and performed the song along with a cover of Seiko Matsuda's "Hitomi wa Diamond" (1983). She has performed the song on all of her concert tours—from the Piece of Life (2001) through Time for Music (2010). On the Cherish You (2007) and Time for Music concert tours, she performed the 97–07 version of the song. A footage of performance from the Piece of Life tour was used to promote the DVD release of the concert.

Apart from the tours, she has also performed the song on various televised appearances. In 2003, she appeared on the talk show hosted by Japanese singer Ayumi Hamasaki and performed the song and "Ashita ni Kuchizuke o" (2003) alongside Hamasaki. Three years later, Matsu sang the song on Music Fair, alongside Sukima Switch. In 2009, Matsu performed the song on the FM802 sponsored event Radio Magic, with Yoshiyuki Sahashi directing the backing band to a crowd of about 12,000 people. A writer for Barks wrote that Matsu's vocals sounded "transparent" and the whole performance had a "refreshing feeling". Oricon magazine commented that Matsu sang "cheerfully" while "running around the stage". The same year, she performed it on the Christmas no Yakusoku 2009 (クリスマスの約束2009) show organized by TBS. In 2014, she performed the song again for NHK, at the J-Pop Heisei Music Graffiti (J-POP 平成ミュージック・グラフィティー) event.

The song was covered by Hiromi Hirata as Makoto Kikuchi of The Idolmaster series as a "Special Request" song. It was later included in the album, The Idolmaster Special Spring (2010), released through Nippon Columbia. The album peaked at number 18 on the Oricon Albums Chart. It was also covered for the spring compilation Cafe de Nagareru Sweet Jazz 20 the Best Sakura Songs, which peaked at number 39 on the Oricon albums chart. The song has also been covered by many mainstream pop artists like Namie Amuro in 1997, for the show The Yoru mo Hippare (THE夜もヒッパレ; "The Night of Hit Parade"), in 1998 by Masaharu Fukuyama for All Night Nippon, and in 2008 by Ayumi Shibata for Uta Doki! Pop Classics (歌ドキッ! 〜ポップクラシックス〜).

== Track listing ==
8cm single
No.	Title	Lyrics	Music	Arranger	Length
1.	"Ashita, Haru ga Kitara"	Yūji Sakamoto	Daisuke Hinata	D. Hinata	4:21
2.	"Zutto... Iyō yo" (ずっと…いようよ "Let's Be Together Forever")	Takako Matsu	D. Hinata	D. Hinata	4:58
3.	"Ashita, Haru ga Kitara (Original Karaoke)"	Y. Sakamoto	D. Hinata	D. Hinata	4:21
Total length:					13:40

== Credits and personnel ==
Adapted from Sora no Kagami liner notes.

- Takako Matsu – vocals
- Daisuke Hinata – keyboards, programming, mixing
- Bud Rizzo – guitars, bass, programming
- Shinnosuke Soramachi – acoustic guitar
- Steve Hall – mastering

== Re-release ==
"Ashita, Haru ga Kitara 97–07"
- "Ashita, Haru ga Kitara 97-07" digital download cover.

Single by Takako Matsu

from the album Cherish You
- Released: March 21, 2007
- Recorded: 2007
- Length: 4:54
- Label: Ariola Japan
- Songwriters: Yūji Sakamoto (lyrics); Daisuke Hinata (melody)

Takako Matsu singles chronology
"Minna Hitori" (2006)	"Ashita, Haru ga Kitara 97–07" (2007)	"Kimi to Nara" (2009)

A re-recorded version of the song was released as a single to commemorate Matsu's tenth anniversary in music industry, to digital outlets like iTunes, mora, and also in Chaku-Uta format, both as ringtone and the full song on March 21, 2007. The new version titled, "Ashita, Haru ga Kitara 97–07" (明日、春が来たら 97–07) was recorded at the Mouri Art Works Studio in Tokyo. Its modified lyrics penned by Yūji Sakamoto, the writer of the original song, are meant to convey the emotions of the singer ten years into her debut. In addition, Matsu's vocals from the original version are intermixed with the new vocals to contrast the difference between the current Matsu and the Matsu of ten years ago. While talking to NHK at the time of the single's release, Matsu commented that the new lyrics not only reflect the changes she had made over the past 10 years, but also of Yūji Sakamoto.

The new version, running 4 minutes and 54 seconds, was arranged by musician and future husband Yoshiyuki Sahashi. The song was included in her eighth studio album, Cherish You (2007). and also on Matsu's compilation album, Footsteps: 10th Anniversary Complete Best (2008). A TV commercial for the new track was also directed by Hiroyuki Itaya. The song was used as the ending theme to the Fuji TV drama, Matsumoto Kisaburō Ikka Monogatari: Ojisan no Daidokoro (松本喜三郎一家物語 〜おじいさんの台所〜; "The Story of Matsumoto Kisaburo's Family: Grandfather's Kitchen").

=== Reception ===
While reviewing Cherish You, Takayuki Saito of HotExpress magazine noted that the track has a "novel" arrangement and Matsu's current voice "calls out" to her "innocent" self of ten years ago. He further commented that Matsu's voice, "full of strength", helps the listeners realize how much she has grown over the years. CD Journal's reviewer wrote that the lyrics of the new version are more "positive" than the original version. They further noted that the song "overflows with adventurous spirit" woven with "nostalgia and freshness".

=== Track listing ===
Digital download
No.	Title	Lyrics	Music	Arranger	Length
1.	"Ashita, Haru ga Kitara 97-07"	Y. Sakamoto	D. Hinata	Yoshiyuki Sahashi	4:54
Total length:					4:54

== Charts and certifications ==
=== Original version ===
Chart (1997)	Peak position
Oricon Weekly Singles Chart	8
Oricon Yearly Singles Chart	75
Chart (2012)	Peak position
Billboard Japan Hot 100	65
Chart (2015)	Peak position
Billboard Japan Hot 100	65

=== Certifications ===
Country	Provider	Certifications
Japan	RIAJ	Platinum

== Notes ==
1. The name of the person was not revealed in the interview.
2. Per the old criterion.
