= Zhang Zixuan =

Chinese model and actress (born 1984)

- 张子萱
- Born: 6 February 1984 (age 42); Beijing, China
- Education: Beijing Union University
- Occupations: Actress; model
- Years active: 2002–present
- Spouses: Yang Yiliu (m. 2011; div. 2015) Chen He (m. 2016)

Chinese name
- Traditional Chinese: 張子萱
- Simplified Chinese: 张子萱
Transcriptions
Standard Mandarin
- Hanyu Pinyin: Zhāng Zǐxuān

Zhang Zixuan (Chinese: 张子萱; born 6 February 1984) is a Chinese model and actress.

Zhang is noted for her role as Li Ke in the film Love Is Not Blind (2011).

== Early life ==
Zhang was born and raised in Beijing, where she attended Beijing Union University, majoring in advertising planning.

== Acting career ==
Zhang began her career as a fashion model in 2002, and signed with the modeled for the magazine Ray.

Zhang gained fame for her starring role as Li Ke in the 2011 romantic comedy film Love Is Not Blind, which she received Hundred Flowers Award and Golden Horse Award nominations for Best New Performer.

For her role as Yi Na in the metropolitan drama Fashion Girl Editor (2012), Zhang was nominated for the Huading Award for Best New TV Actress.

In 2013, Zhang starred in the family-themed drama Little Daddy with Wen Zhang and Ma Yili. She played the title role in the television series I Am Hao Congming.

In 2014, Zhang co-starred with Yang Mi and Shawn Yue in V Love. She also starred in the youth film Fleet of Time.

In 2015, Zhang starred in the comedy series Laughter Medical Center and medical drama Grow Up.

== Filmography ==
=== Film ===
Year	English title	Chinese title	Role	Notes
2011	Love Is Not Blind	失恋33天	Li Ke	
2013	Up in the Wind	等风来		Cameo
2014	Fleet of Time	匆匆那年	Lin Jiarong	
2015	Go Away Mr. Tumor	滚蛋吧！肿瘤君	Amy	

=== Television series ===
Year	English title	Chinese title	Role	Notes/Ref.
2012	Fashion Girl Editor	时尚女编辑	Yi Na	
2013	I am Hao Congming	我叫郝聪明	Hao Congming	
2013	Little Daddy	小爸爸	Shanshan	
2014	My Son is Wonderful	我的儿子是奇葩	Lin Miaoxue	
2014	V Love	微时代之恋	Ding Xiaorou	
2015	Laughter Medical Center	医馆笑传	Chen Anan	
2015	Grow Up	长大	Bai Xiaoqing	
2016	Road to the North	一念向北	Wu Yingying	

== Awards and nominations ==
Year	Work	Award	Result	Ref.
2012	Love Is Not Blind	49th Golden Horse Award for Best New Performer	Nominated	
2012	Love Is Not Blind	Hundred Flowers Award for Best New Performer	Nominated	
2012	Fashion Girl Editor	Huading Award for Best New TV Actress	Nominated	
