= Samurai Gourmet =

2017 Japanese-language television miniseries

- Genre: Comedy
- Starring: Naoto Takenaka; Tetsuji Tamayama; Honami Suzuki
- Country of origin: Japan
- Original language: Japanese
- No. of seasons: 1
- No. of episodes: 12

Production
- Running time: 16–22 min.

Original release
- Network: Netflix
- Release: March 17, 2017

Samurai Gourmet (Japanese: 野武士のグルメ, Hepburn: Nobushi no gurume; lit. 'Gourmet of the Wild Samurai') is a twelve-part 2017 Japanese-language television series on Netflix, based on Masayuki Kusumi's essay and the manga of the same title. The premise revolves around Takeshi Kasumi (Naoto Takenaka), told in a slice of life style. Now a retired salaryman, Kasumi discovers the joys of eating and drinking, which awakens his inner persona—a wandering samurai living freely in Japan's age of civil wars.

== Cast ==
- Naoto Takenaka as Takeshi Kasumi
- Tetsuji Tamayama as Samurai
- Honami Suzuki as Shizuko

== Episodes ==
Episode	Title	Original release date
1	"Mid-Day Beer at a Restaurant"	March 17, 2017
Unsure what to do with his newfound freedom, Kasumi takes a stroll around the neighborhood and discovers a local diner he's never been to before. Featured dish: eggplant, bell pepper, and pork with spicy miso (miso itame), paired with beer
2	"The Demoness's Ramen"	March 17, 2017
At Shizuko's suggestion, Kasumi decides to take up walking as a hobby. Soon he's hungry for ramen, but the popular places are too crowded. Featured dish: Chinese-style ramen
3	"Mackerel in the Morning"	March 17, 2017
After a board game session with an old friend goes late, Kasumi decides to spend the night by himself at a local seaside bed-and-breakfast. Featured dish: saba shioyaki (grilled mackerel) eaten with pickles, nori, soup, and rice for breakfast
4	"Yakiniku Her Way"	March 17, 2017
Shizuko asks Kasumi to give their college-aged niece Masako career advice. He takes her out to dinner but has trouble controlling the conversation. Featured dish: yakiniku
5	"Bento Lunch on Set"	March 17, 2017
Kasumi is excited for his first job as an extra and can't wait for the free lunch that comes with the position. But delays keep him waiting for hours. Featured dish: bento
6	"Lunch at an Old-Fashioned Café"	March 17, 2017
A search for a book leads Kasumi to an area of town he hasn't been to in years. He decides to read in a café, but only a "pure" one will do. Featured dish: naporitan
7	"Umbrellas at the Dinner Counter"	March 17, 2017
After receiving a clean bill of health, Kasumi decides to celebrate by dining and drinking at a beaten-down but cozy izakaya gastropub. Featured dish: kasane (nikudofu, tofu stew)
8	"Pasta the Samurai Way"	March 17, 2017
Kasumi is concerned about how a new pair of sunglasses makes him look. Lunch at a high-class Italian restaurant makes the problem worse. Featured dishes: potato and crab terrine with a bagna cauda sauce, cold bell pepper soup, vegetable and mozzarella spaghettini
9	"Croquettes of the Heart"	March 17, 2017
While out running an errand for Shizuko, Kasumi spots a simple but delicious treat that brings back happy memories of his childhood. Featured dish: korokke
10	"The White-Haired Knight"	March 17, 2017
Left on his own for dinner, Kasumi wanders the neighborhood to find a suitable place. He settles on a yakitori restaurant with a gruff chef. Featured dish: yakitori
11	"Anniversary Oden"	March 17, 2017
Kasumi surprises Shizuko with an anniversary outing and dinner. After ordering, he worries that she's disappointed by his unambitious menu selections. Featured dish: oden
12	"A Memory of Hashed Beef and Rice"	March 17, 2017
Looking through old photos, Kasumi is struck by a desire to visit a beloved restaurant he had frequented years ago. But when he gets there, it's gone. Featured dish: hayashi rice (erroneously translated as "hashed beef and rice")

== Release ==
Samurai Gourmet has been released on Netflix streaming.

== Critical response ==
Reception has been positive. The Guardian has two separate reviews, one by Stuart Heritage who states "It is joyful, touching and innocent. There are no real stakes to speak of, but that is part of its charm." and another by Aleksandra Bliszczyk who writes "In this spellbinding, lovingly shot series, a recently retired man decides to eat something new every day - and captivates your senses along the way." Food blog Kitchen Catastrophe summarizes: "It's shot well, acted well, the food looks great, and while you probably won't be rolling with laughter, you'll find it's hard to stop smiling." Ashlie D. Stevens for Salon: "The stakes are never life or death, but watching someone successfully become more like the person they want to be is invigorating, especially when the subject is well past the typical 'coming of age' years." Similarly, Riley MacLeod writes for Kotaku: "Samurai Gourmet's small dramas are things all of us have likely experienced in one form or another, and the show's celebration of regular eating habits reminds me of the best episodes of Anthony Bourdain shows." The Daily Utah Chronicle comments on its food storytelling blend: "The show beautifully balances the foodie aspect and the storylines to create a great plot and illustrate the grace and effort that goes into many of the dishes highlighted by the show."
