= Personal Tailor =

- Theatrical release poster
- Simplified Chinese: 私人订制
- Traditional Chinese: 私人訂製
- Hanyu Pinyin: Sīrén dìng zhì
- Directed by: Feng Xiaogang
- Written by: Wang Shuo
- Produced by: Wang Zhonglei; Albert Yeung; Zhang Dajun
- Starring: Ge You; Bai Baihe; Li Xiaolu; Zheng Kai
- Cinematography: Zhao Xiaoshi
- Edited by: Xiao Yang
- Music by: Luan Shu
- Production company: Huayi Brothers
- Distributed by: Huayi Brothers
- Release date: December 19, 2013
- Running time: 119 minutes
- Country: China
- Language: Mandarin
- Box office: $115.5 million

Personal Tailor (Chinese: 私人订制) is a 2013 Chinese comedy film directed by Feng Xiaogang. It stars Ge You, Bai Baihe, Li Xiaolu, and Zheng Kai as a team of specialists at Personal Tailor, a company dedicated to fulfilling clients' most bizarre and extravagant dreams. The film was released on December 19, 2013.

== Plot ==
A unique company called Personal Tailor is run by four specialists: Yang Zhong, a wish planner; Xiao Bai, a scenario designer; Xiao Lu, a dream reconstruction expert; and Ma Qing, a psychological anesthetist. Their business revolves around fulfilling people's most outlandish dreams, no matter how bizarre or demanding. The team never turns down a request, embracing their company's slogan: "Making others happy, while making ourselves miserable."

Soon, a variety of eccentric clients come knocking on their door, each with a peculiar wish. The team faces a series of challenges, including: a self-proclaimed "most vulgar director" who aspires to cut ties with lowbrow entertainment and embrace high art; a taxi driver who voluntarily tests his integrity by resisting bribes and temptations in his quest to be an honest official; and a river cleaner named Dan whose birthday wish is simply to become rich.

As the team meticulously crafts dream-fulfillment plans for each client, an array of absurd, comical, and heartwarming situations unfold.

== Cast ==
- Ge You as Yang Zhong
- Bai Baihe as Xiao Biao
- Li Xiaolu as Xiao Lu
- Zheng Kai as Ma Qing
- Fan Wei as Taxi driver
- Song Dandan as Dan
- Li Chengru as Director
- Miao Pu as Jieniya
- Wang Baoqiang as Wang A Qiang
- Jackie Chan as Himself
- Cao Bingkun as 'Independent Commission Against Corruption Commissioner'
- Guan Xiaotong as Adult dream girl
- Li Yong
- Liang Tian
- Nathaniel Boyd
- Cai Bingkun
- Scotty Bob Cox as Hans
- Angela Qiu as Empire Club Mama-san
- Zhang Jun Yi as Photographer

== Release ==
The film "Personal Tailor" opened to a new record of US$13.2 million including midnight screenings beating Tiny Times record of $12 million set in July 2013. on December 20, 2019, it was released in United States.
