= A Wedding Invitation =

- Film poster
- Directed by: Oh Ki-hwan
- Written by: Yan Qinhai; Mei Ah
- Produced by: Han Sanping; Jeong Tae-sung; Jonathan Kim
- Starring: Bai Baihe; Eddie Peng
- Cinematography: Kim Yong-ho
- Edited by: Shin Min-kyung
- Music by: Lee Ji-soo
- Production companies: China Film Group; CJ Entertainment; C2M Media
- Release date: April 12, 2013 (China)
- Running time: 101 minutes
- Countries: China; South Korea
- Language: Mandarin
- Box office: CN¥192 million (US$31.4 million) (China) ₩127 million (US$118,000) (South Korea)

A Wedding Invitation (Chinese: 分手合约; pinyin: Fēnshǒu héyuē; lit. 'Breakup Agreement') is a 2013 Chinese romantic comedy film directed by Oh Ki-hwan and starring Bai Baihe and Eddie Peng.

== Plot ==
High school sweethearts Qiao Qiao and Li Xing are about to graduate from university when Li Xing surprises Qiao Qiao with a marriage proposal. Qiao Qiao, however, declines the proposal, offering rash arguments as to why she's not ready. Little does he know, Qiao Qiao has a devastating secret. Nonetheless, they write a breakup agreement; if they're both single in five years, they'll get married. They part ways and five years pass. Believing Li Xing is still waiting for her, Qiao Qiao waits patiently for his call. But when Li Xing finally does contact her it's to invite her to his wedding. Qiao Qiao is flabbergasted and is determined to win her former flame back at any cost, even though the secret that forced them apart lingers.

== Cast ==
- Bai Baihe as Qiao Qiao
- Eddie Peng as Li Xing
- Jiang Jinfu as Mao Mao
- Pace Wu as Zhou Rei
- Lin Mei-hsiu as Li Xing's mother

== Release ==
The movie was released in China on April 12, 2013, in the US and Canada on May 24 and 31, 2013 for limited screenings, in Hong Kong on June 6, 2013, and in South Korea on June 20, 2013.

== Reception ==
The film grossed CN¥192 million (US$31.4 million) in China and ₩127 million (US$118,000) in South Korea.
