= The Truth About Beauty =

2014 Chinese-Hong Kong film by Aubrey Lam

- Film poster
- Directed by: Aubrey Lam
- Written by: Aubrey Lam; Joyce Chan
- Produced by: Peter Chan; Jojo Hui
- Starring: Bai Baihe; Ronald Cheng; Zhang Yao; Guo Jingfei
- Cinematography: Jake Pollock
- Edited by: Derek Hui; Shirley Yip; Azrael Chung
- Music by: Yu Quan
- Production company: We Pictures
- Distributed by: Edko Films
- Release dates: 4 April 2014 (China); 24 April 2014 (Hong Kong)
- Running time: 84 minutes
- Countries: China; Hong Kong
- Language: Mandarin
- Box office: US$13,380,000

The Truth About Beauty (Chinese: 整容日记) is a 2014 romantic comedy film directed by Aubrey Lam and starring Bai Baihe, Ronald Cheng, Zhang Yao and Guo Jingfei. A Chinese-Hong Kong co-production, the film was released on 4 and 24 April 2014 in mainland China and Hong Kong respectively.

== Cast ==
- Bai Baihe
- Ronald Cheng
- Zhang Yao
- Guo Jingfei

== Reception ==
The film has earned US$13,380,000 in China.

On Film Business Asia, Derek Elley gave the film a grade of 7 out of 10, calling it a "scabrous satire on success and cosmetic surgery".
