= A City Called Macau =

2019 Chinese-Hong Kong film by Li Shaohong

- Film poster
- Simplified Chinese: 妈阁是座城
- Hanyu Pinyin: Mā gé shì zuò chéng
- Directed by: Li Shaohong
- Written by: Geling Yan; Wei Lu; Chan Man Keung
- Produced by: Yu Dong
- Starring: Bai Baihe; Huang Jue; Carina Lau; Wu Gang
- Cinematography: Zeng Nianping
- Edited by: William Chang
- Music by: Peter Kam
- Production companies: Perfect World Pictures; Beijing Culture
- Release dates: 27 December 2018 (Hong Kong); 14 June 2019 (China)
- Running time: 127 minutes
- Countries: China; Hong Kong
- Language: Mandarin
- Box office: $7,322,128

A City Called Macau (Chinese: 妈阁是座城) is a 2019 drama film directed by Li Shaohong, and starring Bai Baihe, Huang Jue, Carina Lau and Wu Gang. A Chinese-Hong Kong co-production, the film was released on December 12, 2018. It is based on the novel A City Called Macao.

== Synopsis ==
Macau's return to Chinese sovereignty in 1999 ushered in that city's "golden age." By 2012, the value of Macau's gaming industry was nine times that of Las Vegas, and Macao had become the world's foremost gambling destination. During this period, a unique profession arose: "casino brokers," who provided Macao's gamblers with high-interest lines of credit, under-the-table bets, and other services. It was a high-stakes, high-reward business that made for more thrilling play, but amplified the risks for players, brokers and casinos alike. This heightened risk made gambling more exciting and more dangerous for the participants; it also impacted their interpersonal relationships and outlook on life. It was as if everyone involved were walking on a tightrope. By 2014, however, China's ongoing anti-corruption campaign had dealt a serious blow to the gaming industry in Macao, ending the golden age. This is the background against which our story takes place.

== Cast ==
- Bai Baihe as Mei Xiaoou
- Huang Jue as Shi Qilan
- Wu Gang as Duan Kaiwen
- Carina Lau as Sister Faye
- Tian Liang as Boss Liu
- Samuel Pang as Brother Wah
- Chin Siu-ho
- Wei Lu as Xiao Xiao
- Geng Le as Lu Jintong
- Yu Xiaotong as little brother Yang
- Su Xiaoming as Yu Jiaying
- Hu Xianxu as Le Le
- Eric Tsang as Lao Seung
- Darren Grosvenor as Blackjack Player
