= Chongqing Hot Pot =

- Film poster
- Chinese: 火锅英雄
- Directed by: Yang Qing
- Screenplay by: Yang Qing
- Produced by: Tao Kun; James Li; Chen Kuofu
- Starring: Chen Kun; Bai Baihe; Qin Hao; Yu Entai
- Cinematography: Ni Liao
- Edited by: Li Nanyi
- Music by: Peng Fei; Zhao Yingjun
- Production companies: Wanda Pictures; New Classics Pictures; CKF Pictures; Hehe (Shanghai) Pictures; K. Pictures (Beijing); Heyi Pictures; Easy Entertainment Haining
- Distributed by: Wuzhou Film Distribution
- Release dates: 21 March 2016 (HKIFF); 1 April 2016
- Running time: 94 minutes
- Country: China
- Language: Mandarin
- Box office: US$58.4 million

Chongqing Hot Pot (Chinese: 火锅英雄; lit. 'Hot Pot Hero') is a 2016 Chinese caper screwball comedy film written and directed by Yang Qing and starring Chen Kun, Bai Baihe, Qin Hao and Yu Entai. The film had its world premiere in March 2016 at the 2016 Hong Kong International Film Festival and was released in China by Wuzhou Film Distribution on 1 April 2016.

== Plot ==
From director Yang Qing (One Night at the Supermarket) comes Chongqing Hot Pot, the official opening night film at the Hong Kong International Film Festival. When three friends open a hot pot restaurant in a former bomb shelter, they discover it's linked by a single wall to the bank vault next door. While deciding to take the easy money or go to the police, they find out one of the bank's employees is a former classmate and look to enlist her in deciding their future. The movie ended on a happy note with the four friends eating together loosely discussing their future on the roof of the hospital where Liu Bo is admitted.

== Cast ==
- Chen Kun as Liu Bo
- Bai Baihe as Yu Xiaohui
- Qin Hao as Xu Dong
- Yu Entai as Four Eyes

== Reception ==
=== Box office ===
The film grossed US$5.7 million on its opening day in China. It grossed a total of CN¥370.5 million in China. It grossed US$58.4 million worldwide.

=== Critical response ===
Chongqing Hot Pot received a 22% approval rating on review aggregator website Rotten Tomatoes, based on 9 reviews and has an average rating of 6.1/10. James Marsh of Screen Daily said that "while scant characterisation and flailing tonal shifts may prevent the film from standing up to serious scrutiny, Yang is clearly out to have fun, and on that front his belated second feature certainly delivers."

== Awards and nominations ==
| Awards | Category | Nominee | Results | Ref. |
|---|---|---|---|---|
| 31st Golden Rooster Awards | Best Sound | Huang Jing | Won | |
