= Grow Up (TV series) =

2015 Chinese television series

- Directed by
- Starring: Bai Baihe
- Country of origin: China
- Original language: Mandarin
- No. of episodes: 38

Production
- Production location: China

Original release
- Network: Dragon Television, Tianjin Television
- Release: 29 January – 16 February 2015

Grow Up
- Simplified Chinese: 長大
Transcriptions
Standard Mandarin
- Hanyu Pinyin: Zhang Da

Grow Up (Chinese: 長大; pinyin: Zhang Da is a 2015 Chinese television series. It aired on Dragon TV from January 29 to February 16, 2015. Set against the backdrop of a hospital, this drama tells the story of a group of medical interns as they transition from immaturity to maturity during their surgical rotations.

== Synopsis ==
Ye Chunmeng (Bai Baihe) faces Chen Xi (Jiang Shuying), Xie Nanxiang (Bai Yu) and Bai Xiaojing (Zhang Zixuan).

== Cast ==
- Bai Baihe as Ye Chunmeng
- Lu Yi as Zhou Ming
- Feng Jiayi as Chen Xuewen
- Jiang Shuying as Chen Xi
- Zhang Zixuan as Bai Xiaojing
- Bai Yu as Xie Nanxiang
- Liu Lu as Xie Xiaohe

== Production ==
Production started in February 2014 and finished in June 2014.

== Soundtrack ==
Lyrics and tune composed by Qin Hao

== Reception ==
=== Ratings ===
China Dragon TV / Jiangsu TV premiere ratings (CSM50)
Episodes	Broadcast date	Dragon TV					
Episodes	Broadcast date	Ratings (%)	Audience share (%)	Rankings	Ratings (%)	Audience share (%)	Rankings

== Awards and nominations ==
Year	Award	Category	Recipient	Result	Ref.

== International broadcast ==
Channel	Location	Broadcast start date	Note
Dragon TV, Tianjin TV	People's Republic of China (the Mainland.)	29 January 2015	
