= Anju Suzuki =

Japanese actress, television presenter (born 1969)

- Born: Kakuko Suzuki; 23 September 1969 (age 57); Minoh, Osaka, Japan
- Other name: Anju Suzuki
- Occupations: Singer; television presenter; actress
- Years active: 1990–present
- Spouse: Motoo Yamagata (m. 1998; died 2013)
- Musical career
- Also known as: Kakko
- Origin: London, England
- Genre: Eurobeat
- Instrument: Vocals
- Labels: CBS Records; Yoshimoto Kogyo

Kakuko Yamagata (née Suzuki; Japanese: 山形 香公子, romanized: Yamagata Kakuko;born 23 September 1969), known professionally as Anju Suzuki (鈴木 杏樹, Suzuki Anju) is a Japanese actress, television presenter, and singer (under the stage name Kakko).

== Career ==
Suzuki was born in Minoh, Osaka and raised in Kobe, Hyogo. At age 17, she was spotted by a CBS records scout when she was commuting to school. Soon after, she moved to the United Kingdom to pursue a singing career. Suzuki worked behind the scenes at PWL Records, doing office duties and familiarising herself with the business side of operations, before she was given the chance to record. Her first single "We Should Be Dancing" (produced by Stock Aitken Waterman) was released in February 1990 and peaked at number 101 on the UK single chart. Her second release "What Kind Of Fool", released in June 1990, reached number 123 in the UK singles chart. Met with little success, she returned to Japan in 1991 and began working as an actress. She has become a popular actress in TV dramas and appears in many commercials.

Suzuki hosted Music Fair from 1995 to 2016.

On 8 July 2022, Suzuki released her first single in 32 years, a re-recording of “We Should Be Dancing” performed as a duet with comedian and singer Takashi Fujii.

== Personal life ==
Suzuki married surgeon Motoo Yamagata in June 1998. The couple met in January 1998 when Suzuki was admitted to hospital for abdominal pain. Yamagata was her operating surgeon. He died of liver disease on 1 February 2013 in hospital at Boston at age of 56

== Filmography ==
=== Film ===
- High School Teacher (1993)
- Birthday Present (1995)
- ZOO SO-Far (2005)
- What a Wonderful Life!! (2011)
- Aibou Series X DAY (2013)
- Waka Okami wa Shōgakusei! (2018)

=== Television ===
- Asunaro Hakusho (1993)
- Chōnan no Yome (1994)
- Wakamono no Subete (1994)
- Music Fair (1995–2016), Host
- Natsuzora: Natsu's Sky (2019), Ranko Kameyama

== Discography ==
=== Singles ===
==== Solo ====
1. We Should Be Dancing (CBS, 1990)
2. What Kind Of Fool (CBS, 1990)

==== Kakko and Takashi Fujii ====
1. We Should Be Dancing (Yoshimoto, 2022)

==== Night Tempo feat. Anju Suzuki ====
Live Once (2023)

== Awards ==
| Year | Association | Category | Nominated work | Result | Ref. |
|---|---|---|---|---|---|
| 1993 | Golden Arrow Award | Graph Award | Herself | Won | |
| 1994 | Drama Academy Awards | Best Supporting Actress | Chōnan no Yome | Won | |
| 1995 | Elan d'or Awards | Newcomer of the Year | Herself | Won | |
