= Tokyo Love Story =

Japanese manga and television series

- The cover of the first volume of Tokyo Love Story

東京ラブストーリー
- Manga
- Written by: Fumi Saimon
- Published by: Shogakukan
- Magazine: Big Comic Spirits
- Original run: 1988 – 1990
- Volumes: 4
- Television drama
- Directed by: Kozo Nagayama
- Written by: Yuji Sakamoto
- Music by: Toshifumi Hinata
- Original network: FNS (Fuji TV)
- Original run: January 7, 1991 – March 18, 1991
- Episodes: 11 + 1 Special

Tokyo Love Story (東京ラブストーリー, Tōkyō Rabusutōrī) is a Japanese manga written by Fumi Saimon. It was published by Shogakukan in Big Comic Spirits from 1989 to 1990 and collected into 4 tankōbon volumes.

Tokyo Love Story was adapted into a Japanese television drama in 1991 which aired on Fuji Television in 11 episodes and one special between January and March 1991. The television drama starred Yūji Oda, Honami Suzuki, and Narimi Arimori, and its theme song "Love Story wa Totsuzen ni" by Kazumasa Oda is the 9th best-selling single in Japan.

== Plot ==
Mikami, Kanji, and Satomi have been friends since they were children, having grown up in the same small town in Ehime Prefecture on the island of Shikoku. Now, all three are in their early 20s and have made their way to Tokyo for different reasons. Kanji is last to arrive, having gotten a new job in Heart Sports' sales department and transferring to the Tokyo office. At work, he meets a vivacious new colleague, Rika, as well as being reunited with his best friends from home — Mikami and Satomi. Mikami is Kanji's best male friend and Satomi is their platonic female friend whom both have had a crush on since high school. The situation becomes more complicated as Kanji sees Mikami forcibly kissing Satomi, which upsets Kanji deeply. But he heals his broken heart by developing strong feelings for Rika, who is energetic, funny, encouraging and caring. However, their relationship is a bit unstable because Kanji is dating her on the rebound, and Rika has been having a (not so) secret affair with her and Kanji's boss, Waga. The affair is de-emphasized in the TV series, but in the manga, the affair is much more important. Rika gets pregnant with Waga's child (not shown in the drama version). Meanwhile, Satomi thinks that Mikami was just playing with her when he kissed her, and so she rejects him. He turns to a medical school classmate, Nagasaki, and begins pursuing her. Eventually Kanji realizes Satomi's feelings, and he chooses her over Rika.

== Cast ==
- Honami Suzuki as Rika Akana
- Yūji Oda as Kanji Nagao
- Narimi Arimori as Satomi Sekiguchi
- Yōsuke Eguchi as Ken'ichi Mikami
- Akiho Sendō as Naoko Nagasaki
- Tokuma Nishioka as Natsuki Waga
- Kaori Mizushima as Tokiko
- Miki Itō as Ishii
- Hideyuki Nakayama as Watanabe

== Production staff ==
- Producer: Tōru Ōhta (大多亮)
- Director: Kōzō Nagayama (永山 耕三) (episodes 1, 2, 5, 7, 9, 11), Ōhiko Honma (本間歐彥) (eps. 3, 4, 6, 8, 10)
- Screenwriter: Yūji Sakamoto (坂元裕二)

== Episode titles and viewership ==
1. 「出会いと再会」20.7%
2. 「愛ってやつは」20.8%
3. 「二人の始まり」19.9%
4. 「君の翼になる」17.1%
5. 「いつも思い出して」19.9%
6. 「赤い糸に結ばれて」20.1%
7. 「愛は待たない」22.4%
8. 「この恋を信じたい」22.9%
9. 「行かないで」26.3%
10. 「約束」29.3%
11. 「さよなら」32.3%
- SP:「東京ラブストーリー特別編」29.9%

== Accolades ==
Award	Category	Recipient(s)	Result	Ref.
1st TV Life Annual Drama Awards	Best Series	Tokyo Love Story	Won	
1st TV Life Annual Drama Awards	Best Actor	Yuji Oda	Won	
1st TV Life Annual Drama Awards	Best Actress	Honami Suzuki	Won	
1st TV Life Annual Drama Awards	Best Supporting Actor	Yosuke Eguchi	Won	

== Remake ==
A remake premiered on FOD (Fuji TV on demand) and Amazon Prime Video in 2020.

Cast

- Kentarō Itō as Kanji Nagao
- Shizuka Ishibashi as Rika Akana
- Shō Kiyohara as Ken'ichi Mikami
- Anna Ishii as Satomi Sekiguchi
- Hidekazu Mashima as Natsuki Waga
- Riho Takada
- Miyū Teshima
