= Love Is Not Blind =

- Film poster
- Directed by: Teng Huatao
- Written by: Bao Jingjing
- Produced by: Zeng Yingxue; Teng Huatao
- Starring: Wen Zhang; Bai Baihe; Zhang Jiayi
- Cinematography: Jing Chong; Cao Dun
- Edited by: Liu Lei
- Production company: Perfect World Pictures
- Release date: November 8, 2011 (China)
- Running time: 110 minutes
- Country: China
- Language: Mandarin
- Budget: RMB 9 million (US$1.4 million)
- Box office: RMB 350 million (US$56 million)

Love Is Not Blind (Chinese: 失恋33天; lit. '33 Days of Breakup') is a 2011 Chinese romantic comedy film directed by Teng Huatao. The film was adapted from an online novel written by Bao Jingjing which has been popular among cyber users since its appearance. Due to the popularity of the source, Teng adapted the novel into a movie, which was said to be prepared especially for Nov. 11 — the Singles' Day in China. The film became a major commercial success in China, considering its low budget. Now Teng is considering adapting the novel into a TV play.

== Plot ==
Huang Xiaoxian, a 27-year-old woman who lives in Beijing, breaks up with her boyfriend of 7 years after witnessing him on a date with her best friend in a shopping mall. Heart-broken and depressed, Xiaoxian mopes around at work and nearly gets fired for screwing up a big assignment. With the surprising help from a colleague she usually loathes, Xiaoxian gradually heals, starts to see more truly of herself, and finds love from someone who has always been there for her.

== Cast ==
- Bai Baihe as Huang Xiaoxian
- Wen Zhang as Wang Xiaojian (Wang Yiyang)
- Zhang Jiayi as Da Laowang
- Guo Jingfei as Lu Ran
- Wang Yaoqing as Wei Yiran
- Zhang Zixuan as Li Ke
- Cao Cuifen as Aunt Zhang
- Wei Zongwan as Uncle Chen
- Hai Qing as Aunt Zhang (youth)
- Liao Fan as Uncle Chen (youth)
- Li Nian as Cello teacher
- Jiao Junyan as Feng Jiaqi

== Theme song ==
Love Song, sung by Chen Shanni, with lyrics and music by her as well, was first included in Chen's album Later, we all cried in 2004.

== Accolades and nominations ==
49th Taipei Golden Horse Film Festival

- Best Actress Nomination - Hehe Bai
- Best New Actress - Zixuan Zhang
- Best Soundtrack Nomination - Chaoyang Lin, Wei Ding
- Best Cinematography Nomination - Dun Cao
- Best Adapted Screenplay - Jingjing Bao
