= Sora no Kagami =

Studio album by Takako Matsu
- Released: June 28, 1997
- Recorded: 1997
- Genre: J-pop
- Label: BMG Records

Takako Matsu chronology
Sora no Kagami (1997)	Ai no Tobira (1998)

Sora no Kagami (空の鏡; "Mirror of the sky") is the 1997 debut album of singer-actress Takako Matsu. Members of Cagnet collaborated with Matsu to compose and write this album.

A collection of music videos, directed by Shunji Iwai for this album, was released on VHS the same year. In 2003, the collection became available on DVD in Japan for a limited time.

In 2011, according to Oricon, Sora no Kagami was still ranked as Matsu's highest best-selling album.

== Track listing ==
All music is composed by Daisuke Hinata, except where otherwise noted, albeit arranged by Daisuke Hinata.

CD
No.	Title	Lyrics	Music	Length
1.	"Introduction~Girlfriend" (instrumental)			0:31
2.	"Hello Goodbye"	Yuji Sakamoto		3:49
3.	"I Stand Alone"	Takako Matsu		4:01
4.	"Lovesick"	Takahiro Maeda	Daisuke Hinata, Bud Rizzo	3:29
5.	"Sora no Kagami (空の鏡; "Mirror of the sky")"	Yuji Sakamoto		4:46
6.	"After the Rain"	Yuji Sakamoto		3:25
7.	"Zutto...Iyouyo (ずっと…いようよ; "Together... Forever")"	Takako Matsu		4:59
8.	"A Piano Piece for Carol" (instrumental, piano: Takako Matsu)			2:33
9.	"Tokyo Bādo (東京バード; "Tokyo bird")"	Yuji Sakamoto		3:54
10.	"Karai Kare (からいかれ; "Spicy curry")"	Takahiro Maeda	Daisuke Hinata, Bud Rizzo	4:14
11.	"Ashita, Haru ga Kitara (明日、春が来たら; "Tomorrow, If Spring Should Come")"	Yuji Sakamoto		4:21
12.	"Wind Song ~Album Version~"	Yuji Sakamoto		4:33
13.	"Girl Friend - Angels of Our Time"	Yuji Sakamoto		4:33

== Chart positions ==
Chart (1997)	Peak position
Japan Oricon Albums Chart	4
