= Smoking Gun (TV series) =

- Also known as: Smoking Gun: Critical Evidence
- Genre: Mystery; Forensic
- Written by: Masaaki Sakai
- Directed by: Shosuke Murakami; Genta Sato
- Starring: Shingo Katori; Mariya Nishiuchi; Honami Suzuki; Shōsuke Tanihara
- Theme music composer: Yu Takami; Nobuaki Nobusawa
- Country of origin: Japan
- Original language: Japanese
- No. of episodes: 11

Production
- Executive producers: Aya Moriyasu; Nobuko Iga
- Production location: Japan
- Running time: 54 minutes, Wednesdays at 22:00 (JST)
- Production companies: Fuji Television; Kyodo Television

Original release
- Network: Fuji Television
- Release: 9 April – 18 June 2014

Smoking Gun (SMOKING GUN〜決定的証拠〜, Smoking Gun~Ketteiteki Shōko~) is a 2014 Japanese television series based on the manga. The live-action series was announced on January 11, 2014. It aired on Fuji Television from April 9 to June 18, 2014. It starred Shingo Katori, Mariya Nishiuchi, Honami Suzuki and Shōsuke Tanihara.

== Cast ==
- Shingo Katori as Nagareta Enishi
- Mariya Nishiuchi as Ishinomaki Sakurako
- Honami Suzuki as Chiyoda Maki
- Shosuke Tanihara as Kashiwagi Natsuki
- Yuma Nakayama as Matsui Jotaro
- Tamae Ando as Komiyama Shoko
- Kokone Hamada as Chiyoda Kurumi
- Kana Kurashina as Nagatomo Emily
- Issey Ogata as Tasaka Shigeru

== Episodes ==
Episode #	Broadcast date	Episode title	Romanized title	English title	Rating
1	April 9, 2014	売るのは決定的証拠 科学捜査と人の想いで弱者救う民間科捜研	Uru no wa ketteiteki shōko Kagaku sōsa to hito no omoi de jakusha sukuu minkan Kasōken	The sell is conclusive evidence Private Kasoken to save vulnerable forensic science investigation	10.3%
2	April 16, 2014	強盗か怨恨か？ 防犯カメラが暴く真実	Gōtōka enkon ka? Bōhan kamera ga abaku shinjitsu	Revenge or Robbery? Security camera uncovers the truth	7.2%
3	April 23, 2014	暴かれる過去の秘密 亡き恋人の裏の顔...	Abaka reru kako no himitsu naki koibito no ura no kao…	Face from of dead lover's secret past to be debunked...	7.9%
4	April 30, 2014	甦る過去と因縁!? 遂に新たな犠牲者が	Yomigaeru kako to in'nen! ? Tsuini aratana gisei-sha ga	Fate and the past revived!? A new victim at last	7.5%
5	May 7, 2014	チーム解散 仲間が残した謎の証拠品？	Chīmu kaisan nakama ga nokoshita nazo no shōko-hin?	A team disbanded Evidence of a mysterious man left	8.8%
6	May 14, 2014	謎の女が仕掛けた罠 亡き恋人からの伝言	Nazo no on'na ga shikaketa wana naki koibito kara no dengon	A mysterious woman planted a message from a dead lover	6.2%
7	May 21, 2014	哀しき過去との対峙 謎の天才科学者の影	Kanashiki kako to no taiji nazo no tensai kagaku-sha no kage	Shadow of a genius scientist confronting a mysterious sorrowful past	5.8%
8	May 28, 2014	事件は遂に核心へ！ 容疑者の意外な出生？服役囚が隠す呪われた研究とは?	Jiken wa tsuini kakushin e! Yōgi-sha no igaina shussei? Fukuekishū ga kakusu norowareta kenkyū to wa?	To the core of the incident at last! Surprise birth of the syspect? Research and Prisoners cursed to hide it	6.5%
9	June 4, 2014	目覚めた仲間が語る 真実と埋まりゆく記憶 禁断の研究と不可解な死の謎とは	Mezameta nakama ga kataru shinjitsu to umari yuku kioku kindan no kenkyū to fukakaina shi no nazo to wa	Guy filled with truth wakes up and talks. The forbidden research of the mystery of the mysterious death	6.1%
10	June 11, 2014	遂に真犯人現れる！死者から届いた証拠...遺書とワインに隠したトリック	Tsuini shinhan'nin arawareru! Shisha kara todoita shōko… isho to wain ni kakushita torikku	The real culprit appears at last! Evidence hidden in the wine...suicide note from the dead found on arrival	7.2%
11	June 18, 2014	真実には続きが!? 衝撃の結末と罪の記憶 届けられた恋人の最期の言葉とは	Shinjitsu ni wa tsudzuki ga! ? Shōgeki no ketsumatsu to tsumi no kioku todoke rareta koibito no saigo no kotoba to wa	Is followed by the truth? Memory of sin and ending of shock The last words of the lover was delivered	6.7%
Average viewing ratings: 7.4%
