= Ai no Tobira =

Studio album by Takako Matsu
- Released: September 23, 1998
- Recorded: 1997–98
- Genre: J-pop
- Language: Japanese
- Label: Arista Japan
- Producers: Satoshi Takebe; Takako Matsu

Takako Matsu chronology
Sora no Kagami (1997)	Ai no Tobira (1998)	Itsuka, Sakura no Ame ni... (2000)

Singles from Ai no Tobira
- 1. "Mafuyu no Memories" Released: November 21, 1997; 2. "Sakura Fuwari" Released: March 25, 1998; 3. "Gomen ne" Released: May 27, 1998; 4. "Stay with Me" Released: September 4, 1998

Ai no Tobira (アイノトビラ; "Door of Love") is the second studio album by Japanese actress and recording artist Takako Matsu. It was released on September 23, 1998, through Arista Records Japan. The album peaked at number 3 on the Oricon Albums Chart and was certified Gold by the RIAJ for shipment of 200,000 copies. The album has sold about 245,000 copies in Japan, as of June 2014.

The single "Sakura Fuwari" (サクラ・フワリ; "Cherry Blossoms, Flutter") peaked at number 9 on the Oricon singles chart.

== Reception ==
CD Journal called the album "high standard" and commented that Ai no Tobira suggests Matsu's growth as an artist. The album peaked at number 3 on the Oricon Albums Chart and stayed in the top 20 for 9 weeks. It has sold about 245,000 copies in Japan and has been certified Gold by the RIAJ for shipment of 200,000 copies.

== Track listing ==
All songs arranged by Satoshi Takebe.

No.	Title	Lyrics	Music	Length
1.	"Ai no Tobira (Anata e) (アイノトビラ ～あなたへ～; "Door of Love: To You")" (Instrumental)		Takako Matsu	0:47
2.	"Beginnings"	Kōsaku Nagayama	Shin	4:40
3.	"A Secret"	Takako Matsu	Satoshi Takebe	3:23
4.	"Kisses"	Yūho Iwasato	Chika Ueda	4:10
5.	"Gomen ne. (ごめんね。; "I'm Sorry.")" (Album mix)	Takahiro Maeda	Satoshi Takebe	4:32
6.	"Stay with Me"	Takako Matsu	Satoshi Takebe	4:18
7.	"On the Way Home"	Takako Matsu	Satoshi Takebe	4:06
8.	"20 Candles"	Takako Matsu, Honoka Mamiya	Satoshi Takebe	5:07
9.	"Akubi (あくび; "A Yawn")"	Takako Matsu	Satoshi Takebe	4:32
10.	"Koisuru Gyōza (恋するギョーザ; "In Love with Gyōza")"	Takako Matsu	Satoshi Takebe	2:21
11.	"Kimi ja Nakute mo Yokatta (君じゃなくてもよかった; "Anyone Other than You Would Have Been Great Too")"	Takahiro Maeda	Satoshi Takebe	4:42
12.	"Mafuyu no Memories (真冬のメモリーズ; "Midwinter Memories")"	Takahiro Maeda	Satoshi Takebe	4:13
13.	"Just a Flow"	Satomi Tobimatsu, Kōsaku Nagayama	Shin	4:51
14.	"Sakura Fuwari (サクラ・フワリ; "Cherry blossoms, Gently")" (Live Live)	Takako Matsu	Satoshi Takebe	3:42
15.	"Anata e (あなたへ; "To You")"	Takako Matsu	Takako Matsu	3:11

== Charts and certifications ==
=== Charts ===
Chart (1998)	Peak position
Oricon Weekly Albums Chart	3

=== Certifications ===
Country	Provider	Certifications
Japan	RIAJ	Gold
