= Smoking Gun – Minkan Kasōken Chōsa'in Nagareda Midori =

Japanese manga series

- Smoking Gun - Minkan Kasōken Chōsa'in Nagareda Midori

Smoking Gun 民間科捜研調査員 流田縁
- Genre: Mystery
- Manga
- Written by: Tomohiro Yokomaku
- Illustrated by: Shūji Takeya
- Published by: Shueisha
- Magazine: Grand Jump
- Original run: June 19, 2012 – January 19, 2015
- Volumes: 10
- Live-action series
- Smoking Gun

Smoking Gun - Minkan Kasōken Chōsa'in Nagareda Midori (Smoking Gun 民間科捜研調査員 流田縁) is a Japanese manga series written by Tomohiro Yokomaku and illustrated by Shūji Takeya. It was serialized in Grand Jump from June 2012 to January 2015, and compiled by Shueisha into ten tankōbon volumes.

It was adapted into a Japanese television drama series of the same name that debuted in April 2014.

== Media ==
=== Manga ===
Smoking Gun - Minkan Kasōken Chōsa'in Nagareda Midori, written by Tomohiro Yokomaku and illustrated by Shūji Takeya, began its publication in Shueisha's seinen manga magazine Grand Jump on January 18, 2012. The manga finished on November 19, 2014. Shueisha compiled its individual chapters into ten tankōbon volumes released from June 19, 2012, to January 19, 2015.

=== Drama ===
In the 2014 4th issue of Grand Jump, it was announced that the manga would receive a Japanese television drama adaptation. Smoking Gun was broadcast on Fuji TV from April 9 to June 18, 2014.
