= Itsuka, Sakura no Ame ni... =

Studio album by Takako Matsu
- Released: March 23, 2000
- Genre: J-pop
- Language: Japanese
- Label: Polydor
- Producer: Satoshi Takebe; Takako Matsu

Takako Matsu chronology
Ai no Tobira (1998)	Itsuka, Sakura no Ame ni... (2000)	A Piece of Life (2001)

Singles from Itsuka, Sakura no Ame ni...
- 1. "Yume no Shizuku" Released: September 22, 1999; 2. "Tsuki no Dance" Released: November 17, 1999; 3. "Sakura no Ame, Itsuka" Released: February 2, 2000

Itsuka, Sakura no Ame ni... (Japanese: いつか、桜の雨に…; "Someday, in the Cherry Blossom Rain") is the third studio album by Japanese actress and recording artist Takako Matsu. It was released on March 23, 2000, through Polydor Records in Japan. The album peaked at number 7 on the Oricon Albums Chart and was certified Gold by the Recording Industry Association of Japan (RIAJ). It has sold 194,000 copies in Japan as of July 2014.

== Reception ==
Itsuka, Sakura no Ame ni... peaked at number 7 on the Oricon Albums Chart and stayed in the top 200 for nine weeks. It has sold about 194,000 copies in Japan and has been certified Gold by the RIAJ for shipment of 200,000 copies.

== Charts and certifications ==
=== Charts ===
Chart (2000)	Peak position
Oricon Weekly Albums Chart	7

=== Certifications ===
Country	Provider	Certifications
Japan	RIAJ	Gold
