= I Stand Alone (Takako Matsu song) =

- Original 1997 8cm single cover

Single by Takako Matsu

from the album Sora no Kagami
- B-side: "Lovesick"
- Released: May 21, 1997
- Genre: J-pop
- Length: 4:05
- Label: BMG Japan
- Songwriters: Takako Matsu (lyrics); Daisuke Hinata (melody)
- Producer: Daisuke Hinata

Takako Matsu singles chronology
"Ashita, Haru ga Kitara" (1997)	"I Stand Alone" (1997)	"Wind Song" (1997)

"I Stand Alone" is a song by Japanese singer and actress Takako Matsu, featured on her debut album Sora no Kagami (1997). It was released as the second single from the album in May 1997. The lyrics of the song were penned by Matsu and production handled by Daisuke Hinata. The single peaked at number 7 on the Oricon Singles Chart and was certified Gold by the Recording Industry Association of Japan (RIAJ).

== Track listing ==
8cm single
No.	Title	Lyrics	Music	Arranger	Length
1.	"I Stand Alone"	Takako Matsu	Daisuke Hinata	D. Hinata	4:05
2.	"Lovesick"	Takahiro Maeda	D. Hinata	D. Hinata	3:34
3.	"I Stand Alone (Original Karaoke)"	T. Matsu	D. Hinata	D. Hinata	4:00
Total length:					11:39

== Charts ==
Chart (1997)	Peak position
Oricon Weekly Singles Chart	7
