= Asunaro Hakusho =

Japanese manga series

- Cover of Asunaro Hakusho volume 1 as published by Shogakukan

あすなろ白書
- Manga
- Written by: Fumi Saimon
- Published by: Shogakukan
- Magazine: Big Comic Spirits
- Original run: 1992 – 1993
- Volumes: 3
- Television drama
- Original network: Fuji TV
- Original run: 11 October 1993 – 20 December 1993
- Episodes: 11

Asunaro Hakusho (Japanese: あすなろ白書; lit. "Hiba White Paper") is a Japanese manga series by Fumi Saimon that was serialized in Shogakukan's Big Comic Spirits. It won the Shogakukan Manga Award for general manga in 1992.

== Cast ==
- Hikari Ishida as Narumi Sonoda
- Michitaka Tsutsui as Tamotsu Kakei
- Takuya Kimura as Osamu Toride
- Anju Suzuki as Seika Higashiyama
- Hidetoshi Nishijima as Junichiro Matsuoka
- Ayako Sugiyama as Kyoko Machida
- Yumi Morio as Harumi Sonoda
- Mariko Kaga as Mitsuko Kakei
- Koichi Iwaki as Sosuke Akiba

== Synopsis ==
A coming of age story that follows five young university students who form a circle of friends. Tamotsu and Osamu (Kimura) fall in love with Narumi, who prefers Tamotsu. In order not to hurt each other as friends, both young men try to avoid forming a relationship with Narumi, which inadvertently leads to tragedy among the friends. After the accidental death of Junichiro, the friends leave university for various reasons, leaving Narumi to continue and finish her studies. A few years later they all meet again and are surprised by the secrets that are revealed.

== Live-action drama ==
=== Japanese TV drama ===
The series was adapted as a live-action television drama. It first aired in Japan from 11 October 1993 to 20 December 1993 on Fuji TV, and had an overall viewer rating of 31.9%, making it one of the most popular television dramas of the 1990s. It features music by S.E.N.S. and Fumiya Fujii (True Love), Keiko Touge (Hitosaji no Yuuki) and Fumiya Fujii (Just Like Wind).

Takuya Kimura's acting received critical acclaim and his famous line, "Am I not good enough for you?" has become a famous saying amongst young people and the entertainment world. This drama paved the way to Kimura's stardom in "Long Vacation" (1996).

=== Taiwanese TV drama ===
In 2002, the manga was adapted into a Taiwanese drama titled Tomorrow (Chinese: 愛情白皮書; pinyin: Ai Qing Bai Pi Shu) starring Rainie Yang, Shawn Yue, Christine Fan and Eddie Peng. It was broadcast in Taiwan on China Television (CTV) (中視).

=== Taiwanese TV drama ===
In 2019, the manga was adapted into a Taiwanese drama titled Brave to Love (Chinese: 愛情白皮書; pinyin: Ai Qing Bai Pi Shu) starring Kingone Wang, Ting-hu Zhang, Gingle Wang, Edison Song, Sylvia Hsieh and Andy Wu. It will broadcast in Taiwan on Taiwan Television (TTV) (台視).
