= Fumi Saimon =

Japanese manga artist and novelist

Fumi Saimon 柴門ふみ
- Born: January 19, 1957 (age 69) Tokushima, Tokushima, Japan
- Area: Manga artist
- Awards: Shogakukan Manga Award for general manga - Kazoku no Shokutaku and Asunaro Hakusho; Kodansha Manga Award for general manga - P.S. Genki Desu, Shunpei

Fumi Saimon (柴門ふみ, Saimon Fumi; born 19 January 1957 in Tokushima, Tokushima) is a female Japanese manga artist and novelist. She is best known for the series Tokyo Love Story, which was adapted as a live-action television series.

She is considered one of the artists who are counted as part of the New Wave movement in manga in the last 1970s and early 1980s.

She won the 1983 Kodansha Manga Award for general manga for P.S. Genki Desu, Shunpei and the 1992 Shogakukan Manga Award for general manga for Kazoku no Shokutaku and Asunaro Hakusho.

She is married to manga artist Kenshi Hirokane.
