= Nonstop (Chinese TV series) =

- Qing Chun Jin Xing Shi 青春进行时
- Genre: Comedy; Love Story
- Directed by: Quan Yi Jun / 全益俊
- Opening theme: 希望 by BoBo (band)
- Ending theme: 我不是宅男 by Back Dorm Boys
- Country of origin: China
- Original language: Mandarin
- No. of episodes: 57

Original release
- Network: Dragon TV

Nonstop is the Chinese version of the popular Korean sitcom Nonstop, released in 2009.

== Synopsis ==
All 9 students live together in a dorm, with different personalities. This sitcom revolves mainly around love, and crushes.

== Cast ==
- Fu Xinbo as Fu Baozi 付包子, a rich and honest guy.
- Jing Boran as Jing Bao 井宝, a playboy, who constantly gets into fights with his girlfriend (Jenny).
- Cao Yuan (曹苑) as Cao Yuan Yuan 曹圆圆, a girl who works hard for her money to pay her schools fees, due to financial problems at home. After seeing Jing Bao play the piano, she falls in love with him.
- He Zhuoyan as He Zhuo yan 何琢言, described as manly, and un-girly by most of her peers, and is oblivious to the love that Dong Geng has for her.
- Zhang Xinyu as Jenny, the quiet, calm but very dumb girlfriend of Jing Bao. Throughout the sitcom, she gets all her Chinese sayings wrong, as she grew up in Canada.
- Dan Dan 丹丹 as Dan Dan 丹丹, the oldest out of everyone in the group, and is always wondering why she cannot get a boyfriend even though she is so 'beautiful'.
- Wei Wei as Wei Dong Gen 韦东根, a messy and unhygienic guy, who falls in love with He Zuo Yan, who unfortunately does not like him back. He frequently tricks his friends for money, and never returns his debts.
- Tian Hai 田海 as Tian Hai 田海, an exchange student from Korea.
- Han Geng as guest star
