= Hot Summer Days =

2010 Hong Kong film by Tony Chan and Wing Shya

- Traditional Chinese: 全城熱戀熱辣辣
- Simplified Chinese: 全城热恋热辣辣
- Hanyu Pinyin: Chuán Chéng Rè Liàn Rè Là Là
- Jyutping: Cyun4 Sing4 Jit6 Lyun2 Jit6 Lat6 Lat6
- Directed by: Tony Chan; Wing Shya
- Written by: Tony Chan
- Produced by: Fruit Chan; Paul Cheng
- Starring: Nicholas Tse; Jacky Cheung; Daniel Wu; Vivian Hsu; Barbie Hsu; Rene Liu; Duan Yihong; Angelababy; Jing Boran; Maggie Cheung; Gordon Liu; Charlene Choi; Shawn Yue; Fruit Chan
- Cinematography: Sion Michel
- Edited by: Wenders Li
- Music by: Eddie Chung
- Production companies: STAR TV; Hot Summer Pictures; Huayi Brothers & Taihe Film Investment Co., Ltd.; Fox International Productions
- Distributed by: STAR TV; Huayi Brothers; 20th Century Fox
- Release dates: 11 February 2010 (China); 18 February 2010 (Hong Kong)
- Running time: 93 minutes
- Country: Hong Kong
- Languages: Cantonese; Mandarin
- Budget: US$2 million
- Box office: US$19,573,451

Hot Summer Days is a 2010 Hong Kong romantic comedy film featuring an ensemble cast including Nicholas Tse, Jacky Cheung, Daniel Wu, Vivian Hsu, Barbie Hsu, Rene Liu, Angelababy and Jing Boran and also featuring a guest appearance by Maggie Cheung. The film was released to celebrate both Chinese New Year and Valentine's Day.

== Cast ==
- Nicholas Tse as Wai
- Jacky Cheung as Wah
- Daniel Wu as Sushi master
- Vivian Hsu as Wasabi
- Barbie Hsu as Ding Dang
- Rene Liu as Li Yan
- Duan Yihong as Leslie
- Angelababy as Siu-kei
- Jing Boran as Xiaofang
- Michelle Wai as Model
- Fu Xinbo as Dafu
- Maggie Cheung as Crying Woman
- Gordon Liu as Fai
- Charlene Choi as Bikini Girl
- Shawn Yue as Tattoo Artist
- Fruit Chan as Ice cream vendor
- He Zhuoyan as Xiaoli
- Rosemary Vandenbroucke as Beach Girl
- Kate Yeung as Reporter
- Jan Lamb (voice dubbing)
- Joey Yung (voice dubbing)
- William Chan (unaccredited)
