= Sun Qian (disambiguation) =

Sun Qian may refer to:

- Sun Qian (Chinese: 孙谦), Chinese diplomat and official serving under the warlord Liu Bei in the late Eastern Han dynasty of China
- Sun Qian (jurist) (Chinese: 孙谦), Chinese jurist
- Sun Qian (actress) (Chinese: 孙千), Chinese actress and model
