= 33rd Hundred Flowers Awards =

Chinese film awards ceremony in 2016

The 33rd Hundred Flowers Awards was held on September 24, 2016 in Tangshan, Hebei province.

== Awards and nominations ==
=== Best Film ===
Winner	Winning film	Nominees
N/A	The Dead End	Mojin: The Lost Legend; Monster Hunt; Goodbye Mr. Loser; Wolf Warriors

=== Best Director ===
Winner	Winning film	Nominees
Wuershan	Mojin: The Lost Legend	* Guan Hu for Mr. Six * Peter Chan for Dearest * Wu Jing for Wolf Warriors * Raman Hui for Monster Hunt

=== Best Screenplay ===
Winner	Winning film	Nominees
Cao Baoping/Mai Jiao	The Dead End	* Wu Jing/Liu Yi/Dong Qun/Gao Yan for Wolf Warriors * Zhang Ji for Dearest * Alan Yuen for Monster Hunt * Peng Damo/Yan Fei for Goodbye Mr. Loser

=== Best Actor ===
Winner	Winning film	Nominees
Feng Shaofeng	Wolf Totem	* Feng Xiaogang for Mr. Six * Jing Boran for Monster Hunt * Deng Chao for The Dead End * Huang Bo for Dearest

=== Best Actress ===
Winner	Winning film	Nominees
Xu Qing	Mr. Six	* Bai Baihe for Go Away Mr. Tumor * Zhao Wei for Dearest * Yu Nan for Wolf Warriors * Shu Qi for Mojin: The Lost Legend

=== Best Supporting Actor ===
Winner	Winning film	Nominees
Li Yifeng	Mr. Six	* Zhang Yi for Dearest * Chen Xiao for The Taking of Tiger Mountain * Duan Yihong for The Dead End * Xia Yu for Mojin: The Lost Legend

=== Best Supporting Actress ===
Winner	Winning film	Nominees
Angelababy	Mojin: The Lost Legend	* Wang Zhi for Goodbye Mr. Loser * Li Yuan for Go Away Mr. Tumor * Yao Chen for Monster Hunt * Liang Jing for Mr. Six

=== Best Newcomer ===
Winner	Winning film	Nominees
Zhuang Xiaolong	Wolf Warriors	* Li Yiqing for Dearest * Cherry Ngan for Mojin: The Lost Legend

=== Lifetime Achievement award ===
- Tao Yuling
- Ge Cunzhuang
- Liang Xin
- Xie Fang

=== Outstanding Film ===
- Wolf Warriors

=== Outstanding Film Special Commendation ===
- The Taking of Tiger Mountain
