= List of 2015 box office number-one films in China =

This is a list of 2015 box office number-one films in China (only Mainland China).

== Number-one films ==
†	This implies the highest-grossing movie of the year.

Week	Date	Film	Gross in USD	Notes
1	January 4, 2015	The Taking of Tiger Mountain	$59.79 million	
2	January 11, 2015	Night at the Museum: Secret of the Tomb	$26.53 million	
3	January 18, 2015	20 Once Again	$19.55 million	
4	January 25, 2015	The Hobbit: The Battle of the Five Armies	$50.36 million	
5	February 1, 2015	The Hobbit: The Battle of the Five Armies	$43.15 million	
6	February 8, 2015	Running Man	$24.70 million	
7	February 15, 2015	Somewhere Only We Know	$38.24 million	
8	February 22, 2015	Dragon Blade	$56.33 million	
9	March 1, 2015	From Vegas to Macau II	$70.26 million	
10	March 8, 2015	Big Hero 6	$30.10 million	
11	March 15, 2015	Cinderella	$25.21 million	
12	March 22, 2015	Cinderella	$28.58 million	
13	March 29, 2015	Kingsman: The Secret Service	$24.64 million	
14	April 5, 2015	Wolf Warriors	$33.29 million	
15	April 12, 2015	Furious 7	$64.34 million	
16	April 19, 2015	Furious 7	$188.60 million	
17	April 26, 2015	Furious 7	$73.45 million	
18	May 3, 2015	Furious 7	$46.00 million	
19	May 10, 2015	Furious 7	$17.47 million	
20	May 17, 2015	Avengers: Age of Ultron	$155.75 million	
21	May 24, 2015	Avengers: Age of Ultron	$54.26 million	
22	May 31, 2015	Stand by Me Doraemon	$38.29 million	
23	June 7, 2015	San Andreas	$51.95 million	
24	June 14, 2015	Jurassic World	$99.15 million	
25	June 21, 2015	Jurassic World	$68.49 million	
26	June 28, 2015	Jurassic World	$37.96 million	
27	July 5, 2015	Monk Comes Down the Mountain	$38.25 million	
28	July 12, 2015	Tiny Times 4	$58.39 million	
29	July 19, 2015	Monster Hunt †	$107.02 million	
30	July 26, 2015	Monster Hunt †	$113.16 million	
31	August 2, 2015	Monster Hunt †	$68.36 million	
32	August 9, 2015	Monster Hunt †	$39.54 million	
33	August 16, 2015	Go Away Mr. Tumor	$29.75 million	
34	August 23, 2015	Go Away Mr. Tumor	$36.11 million	
35	August 30, 2015	Terminator Genisys	$58.16 million	
36	September 6, 2015	Hundred Regiments Offensive	$39.40 million	
37	September 13, 2015	Mission: Impossible – Rogue Nation	$86.42 million	
38	September 20, 2015	Mission: Impossible – Rogue Nation	$33.70 million	
39	September 27, 2015	Lost in Hong Kong	$106.80 million	
40	October 4, 2015	Lost in Hong Kong	$102.20 million	
41	October 11, 2015	Goodbye Mr. Loser	$99.84 million	
42	October 18, 2015	Goodbye Mr. Loser	$46.69 million	
43	October 25, 2015	Ant-Man	$39.07 million	
44	November 1, 2015	Ant-Man	$19.48 million	
45	November 8, 2015	Maze Runner: The Scorch Trials	$21.54 million	
46	November 15, 2015	Spectre	$48.55 million	
47	November 22, 2015	Spectre	$29.49 million	
48	November 29, 2015	The Martian	$49.03 million	
49	December 6, 2015	The Martian	$27.04 million	
50	December 13, 2015	Point Break	$18.80 million	
51	December 20, 2015	Mojin: The Lost Legend	$93.39 million	
52	December 27, 2015	Mojin: The Lost Legend	$95.70 million	

== See also ==
- List of Chinese films of 2015
