= Jing Boran =

Chinese actor and singer

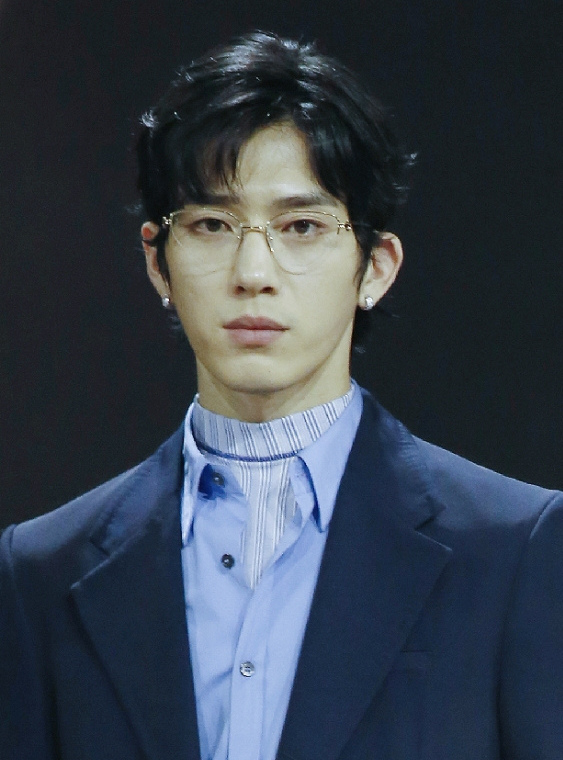
- Jing in 2020
- Born: April 19, 1989 (age 37); Shenyang, China
- Education: Shenyang Foreign Affairs Service School
- Occupations: Actor; singer
- Years active: 2007–present
- Agent: Huayi Brothers
- Musical career
- Origin: China
- Genre: Mandopop
- Instrument: Vocals
- Labels: Huayi Brothers; Seed

Jing Boran (Chinese: 井柏然; pinyin: Jǐng Bórán; born 19 April 1989) or Bobo Jing, is a Chinese actor and singer who achieved popularity after becoming the champion at the 2007 talent contest My Hero. Along with the third-place winner Fu Xinbo, he formed a boy band called BoBo. Since 2008, Jing has appeared on a series of films and televisions. He is known for his leading roles in Chinese films Monster Hunt (2015), Time Raiders (2016), Us and Them (2018), and The Shadow Play (2019).

== Career ==
=== 2007–2014: Beginnings ===
Jing began his singing career after winning the top prize at the 2007 Chinese talent contest My Hero. He then signed a contract with Chinese entertainment company Huayi Brothers and formed a boy band named BoBo with fellow contestant Fu Xinbo. In October 2007, the band released their debut EP, Glory. In 2008, he appeared as a minor unaccredited role in the Chinese film The Equation of Love and Death.

Jing made his feature film debut in the Chinese romance film Hot Summer Days (2010), which won him a Best New Actor award at the Beijing College Student Film Festival. Since then, he has developed a passion for acting and started to focus on acting and refining skills by exploring different genres of film. One of his earlier notable roles is Wang Can in the romance film Up in the Wind (2013) where he played a rich second generation heir who wants to find meaning in life.

In June 2011, Jing signed a recording deal with Seed Music, and released his debut eponymous studio album. The album topped the charts in both mainland China and Taiwan, and won him a Global Chinese Golden Chart Award for Best New Artist.

=== 2015–present: Rising popularity and breakthrough ===
In 2015, Jing started to gain popularity with his role in the time-travel romance drama Love Weaves Through a Millennium and travel reality show Divas Hit the Road; his chemistry and friendship with co-star Zheng Shuang (who also appeared in both programs) was a huge topic online. Jing then starred in the road drama film Lost and Love alongside Hong Kong actor Andy Lau. His performance as a bike mechanic who was orphaned since young earned him a Golden Rooster Award nomination for Best Supporting Actor. The same year, he starred in the fantasy comedy film Monster Hunt; which grossed over 1.8 billion yuan to become one of the highest-grossing films in China. The success of Monster Hunt successfully launched Jing to mainstream fame.

In 2016, Jing starred in the adventure film Time Raiders, which is based on the novel Tomb Raiders. The film was a box office success, and was the only summer release in China to surpass 1 billion yuan. He then starred in the romance-gaming film Love O2O, which is based on the novel under the same title, alongside Angelababy.

In 2017, it was announced that Jing is set to return to the small screen with fantasy period drama The Love of Hypnosis alongside Liu Yifei. In 2018, Jing reprised his role in the sequel of Monster Hunt. The same year, he starred in the romance film Us and Them, directed by Taiwanese actress Rene Liu. It was a hit in China, earning $191 million over its first two weekends. In 2019, Jing starred in the crime suspense film The Shadow Play directed by Lou Ye. The same year, Jing co-starred in the adventure drama film The Climbers .

In 2026, Jing's romantic series The Early Spring alongside Sun Qian ranked 4th worldwide in Netflix and achieved 10,000 popularity index threshold on Youku.

== Ambassadorship ==
In 2015, Jing became the youth ambassador for the Youth Creativity Entrepreneur Awards, established by United Nations Human Settlements Programme.

== Filmography ==
=== Film ===
Year	Title	Role	Notes/Ref.
2008	The Equation of Love and Death	Boy	Cameo
2009	Beautiful Song of Taste	Zhang Zhe	
2010	Hot Summer Days	Xiao Fang	
2011	The Founding of a Party	Xie Zhaomin	
2011	Love in Space	Wen Feng	
2012	Shadows of Love	Bi Da	
2012	The Bullet Vanishes	Xiao Wu	
2012	The Guillotines	Hou Jia Shisan	
2013	Up in the Wind	Wang Can	
2013	Extreme Pursuit	Ah Sheng	Short film
2014	Rise of the Legend	Che Huo	
2015	Bride Wars	Host	Cameo
2015	Lost and Love	Zeng Shuai	
2015	Monster Hunt	Song Tianyin	
2015	A Tale of Three Cities	Shou Maihua	
2016	Time Raiders	Zhang Qiling	
2016	Love O2O	Xiao Nai	
2018	Monster Hunt 2	Song Tianyin	
2018	The Faces of My Gene	Lei	Cameo
2018	Us and Them	Lin Jianqing	
2019	The Shadow Play	Yang Jiadong	
2019	The Climbers	Li Guoliang	
2025	Odds Beater	Cai Wanjin	

=== Television series ===
Year	Title	Role	Notes/Ref.
2009	Nonstop	Jing Bao	
2009	Girl Rushes Forward	Jing Xiaoqiao	
2011	33 Story Halls	Zhang Chengyou	
2013	New Editorial Department Story	He Cheche	
2015	Love Weaves Through a Millennium	Gong Ming	
2021	Faith Makes Great	Qi Jianhua	
2021	Psychologist	Qian Kaiyi	
2023	A League of Nobleman	Lan Jue	
2023	Road Home	Lu Yanchen/Lu Chen	
2024	Regeneration	Fei Ke/Li Zerui	
2026	Sunsets Secrets Regrets	Jiang Hansheng	
2026	The Early Spring	Luan Nian/Luke Luan	
2026	The Silent Storm	Ouyang Xu	
TBA	Win or Die	Qiao Sanyi	
TBA	Jia You Qi Lang	Liang Dongqiang	
TBA	The Love of Hypnosis	Ye Shen	

=== Variety shows ===
Year	Title	Role	Notes/Ref.
2015	Divas Hit the Road	Cast member	Season 2
2016	Fighting Man		
2017	Divas Hit the Road	Cast member	Season 3
2018	I Actor	Mentor	
2019	Who's the Murderer	Cast member	Season 5
2020	Go Fridge	Guest	Season 6 (Episode 7, 8)

== Discography ==
=== Albums ===
Year	English title	Chinese title	Notes
2010	Warm Hands	暖暖手	with Guo Biyao
2011	Jing Boran	井柏然首张同名专辑	

=== Singles ===
Year	English title	Chinese title	Album	Notes/Ref.
2009	"Homework"	回家作业	Nonstop OST	
2009	"Be Happier"	快乐多一些	Nonstop OST	
2009	"Jiayou Angel"	天使加油		
2010	"Hot Summer Days"	全城热恋	Hot Summer Days OST	
2012	"No Valentine's Day"	不过情人节		
2014	"Another Side of the City"	你飞到城市另一边	Up in the Wind OST	
2015	"Where Will You Be Tomorrow"	明天你會在哪	Monster Hunt OST	with Bai Baihe
2015	"Can't Forget"	不能忘	Love Weaves Through a Millennium OST	with Zheng Shuang
2016	"The Initial Dream"	最初的梦想	Love O2O OST	
2017	"Beauty and the Beast"	美女与野兽	Beauty and the Beast OST	Chinese version; with Hebe Tien

== Accolades ==
=== Awards and nominations ===
Year	Award	Category	Nominated work	Result	Ref.
Major awards
2010	17th Beijing College Student Film Festival	Best New Actor	Hot Summer Days	Won	
2011	30th Hong Kong Film Awards	Best New Performer	Hot Summer Days	Nominated	
2011	9+2 Music Pioneer Awards	Best New Artist (Mainland China)	—N/a	Won	
2011	9+2 Music Pioneer Awards	Top 10 Songs of the Year	"Where Did Love Drop"	Won	
2011	9+2 Music Pioneer Awards	Most Popular Duet	"Warm Hands"	Won	
2012	2nd Global Chinese Golden Chart Awards	Best New Artist (Silver)	Jing Boran	Won	
2012	Music Radio China Top Chart Awards	Best New Artist (Mainland China)	—N/a	Won	
2012	Huading Awards	New Actor Award (China)	Hot Summer Days	Won	
2015	30th Golden Rooster Awards	Best Supporting Actor	Lost and Love	Nominated	
2015	15th Chinese Film Media Awards	Most Anticipated Actor	Rise of the Legend	Nominated	
2016	33rd Hundred Flowers Awards	Best Actor	Monster Hunt	Nominated	
2016	13th Changchun Film Festival	Best Supporting Actor	Lost and Love	Won	
2020	35th Hundred Flowers Awards	Best Supporting Actor	The Climbers	Nominated	
Other awards
2007	BQ Awards	Popularity Award (Silver)	—N/a	Won	
2011	"Love The Future" Beijing Charity Night	Charity Star	—N/a	Won}	
2011	1st Cantonese Youth Film Awards	Most Popular Newcomer	—N/a	Won	
2012	Sprite Music Awards	Best Newcomer	—N/a	Won	
2012	Sprite Music Awards	Best Song	"Jing Zi You Xi"	Won	
2012	CityFM Music Awards	Newcomer of the Year	—N/a	Won	
2012	3rd LETV Film & Drama Awards	Rising Film Actor	—N/a	Won	
2013	Shen Bao Award Ceremony	Best Young Film Actor	—N/a	Won	
2015	GQ 2015 Men of the Year	Idol of the Year	—N/a	Won	
2015	L'Officiel Night	Award	—N/a	Won	
2015	Bazaar Men of the Year Awards	Most Attractive Star of the Year	—N/a	Won	
2015	"Wind From The East" Entertainment Influence Awards	Film Figure of the Year	—N/a	Won	
2015	5th iQiyi All-Star Carnival	Rising Star of the Year	—N/a	Won	
2015	EMEAward	Most Commercially Valuable Endorser	—N/a	Won	
2016	Baidu Fan Appreciation Season	Baidu Entertainment Person of the Year	—N/a	Won	
2016	10th Tencent Video Star Awards	Most Popular Film Actor	—N/a	Won	
2017	Netease Attitude Awards	Best Actor	—N/a	Won	
2018	15th Esquire Man At His Best Awards	Film Actor of the Year	—N/a	Won	
2019	GQ 2019 Men of the Year	Goodwill Ambassador	—N/a	Won	
2019	Cosmo Glam Night	Person of The Year (Dream)	—N/a	Won	
2019	16th Esquire Man At His Best Awards	Most Popular Actor	—N/a	Won	
2020	Weibo Awards Ceremony	Weibo God	—N/a	Won	

=== Forbes China Celebrity 100 ===
Year	Rank	Ref.
2017	24th	
2019	31st	
2020	35th	
