= The Early Spring =

Chinese television series

- Promotional poster
- Also known as: Bright Early Spring
- Simplified Chinese: 早春晴朗
- Hanyu Pinyin: Zǎo Chūn Qíng Lǎng
- Genre: Romance; Drama; Workplace
- Based on: Zao Chun Qing Lang by Gu Niang Bie Ku
- Written by: Gao Xiao Xian
- Directed by: Jiang Ji Zheng
- Starring: Jing Boran; Sun Qian
- Country of origin: China
- Original language: Mandarin
- No. of episodes: 24

Production
- Production locations: Beijing; Harbin
- Running time: 45–53 minutes
- Production companies: Youku; Qianyu Studio

Original release
- Network: Youku; Netflix
- Release: 26 August – 9 September 2026

The Early Spring (Chinese: 早春晴朗; pinyin: Zǎo Chūn Qíng Lǎng) is a 2026 Chinese television series starring Jing Boran and Sun Qian. It is adapted from the web novel of the same name by Gu Niang Bie Ku, directed by Jiang Ji Zheng and written by Gao Xiao Xian. The story is about a young professional navigating a competitive advertising agency while entangled in a complex romance with her demanding superior. On 26 August 2026, it was released on Youku and Netflix.

The series exceeded 10,000 'Popularity Heat Index' points on Youku throughout its broadcast period, and achieved a historic first for Chinese series by entering the 'Top 3' on Netflix: ranking 4th in 'Top TV Shows Worldwide' and 2nd in the 'Global Non-English TV List'. It was listed as S+ Tier i.e. 'Top Performing Shows' on Yunhe Chart. Upon its release, Jing Boran and Sun Qian were ranked as 'Top C-drama Artists in the International Market', while their portrayals topped the 'Character Index List'.

== Synopsis ==
Shang Zhitao (Sun Qian), a determined young woman from a modest background, unexpectedly lands a job at a top advertising agency. There she encounters an aloof and demanding industry veteran Luan Nian (Jing Boran). Navigating intense office politics and a complex romance with Luan Nian, she gradually transforms from a naive newcomer into a seasoned professional.

== Cast ==
=== Main ===
- Sun Qian as Shang Zhitao / Flora. An optimistic and hardworking woman who navigates the challenges of a competitive corporate environment.
- Jing Boran as Luan Nian / Luke. An advertising executive known for his sharp intellect and detached demeanor.

=== Supporting ===
- Guo Xiaoting as Zang Yao: A special appearance. Luan Nian's childhood friend, who harbors unrequited romantic feelings for him while he views her strictly as family.
- Liu Xiaobei as Sun Yuanzhu: Shang Zhitao's roommate, an introverted autonomous-driving technology researcher. He always takes everyone's feelings into account while quietly dealing with heavy family pressure.
- Qi Tianqing as Sun Yu: Zhitao's supportive friend and housemate.
- Zhang Yezi as Lu Mi: Luan Nian's subordinate, who serves as a trusted career mentor to Shang Zhitao.
- Liu Chang as Will: Head of the marketing department, who harbors feelings for Lu Mi.
- Ning Xin as Kitty: A colleague in the company.
- Zhao Zhenyu as Tan Mian: A former advertising executive turned private kitchen owner, who serves as Luan Nian's love mentor.
- Peng Yang as Tracy Liang: Human Resources Manager, who overcomes strong internal opposition to hire Shang Zhitao.
- Li Chuan as Alex: Director of the second division and a major business rival to Luan Nian.
- Liu Yongxi as Duane: Luan Nian's former colleague, who leaves to join Alex at his new agency.
- Wen Xiangji as Li Tianran: Alex's former colleague and loyal follower.
- Mu Ruini as Zhang Xin: Luan Nian's ex-girlfriend, who struggles to accept their breakup and relentlessly pursues him.
- Dong Musha as Dony: The new business unit General Manager overseeing new media, who previously betrayed Luan Nian to launch a rival agency.
- Wang Wenqi as Yao Bei: Zhitao's senior
- Lin Peng as Lao Shang: Zhitao's father.
- Zhao Qian as Da Zhai: Zhitao's mother.
- Zhang You as Zhang Lei: Zhitao's landlord.
- Zheng Hao as Xin Zhaozhou: Zhitao's ex-boyfriend
- Stuart Forbes as Long Zhentian: Zhitao's tutor for French and English.
- Zheng Weili as Liang Suyun: Luan Nian's mother, who is a doctor.
- Xiao Han as Luan Siyuan: Luan Nian's cousin.

== Production ==
On 10 September 2024, the project was first announced for Youku during autumn press conference, and the official poster was released. In March 2025, it was listed in the "Network Audiovisual Program Excellence Creation and Dissemination Project" organized by the National Radio and Television Administration (NRTA).

On 5 September 2025, Principal photography officially began in Beijing. The popularity of the novel sparked heated discussions regarding its adaptation tone. In November 2025, early production took placed in Beijing and Harbin, the locations included historic landmarks like Central Street, Saint Sophia Cathedral, and the East Hechang 1917 cultural complex. On 26 November 2025, the filming wrapped at Jinlong Mountain.

Tsai Chia-yin was hired as an intimacy coordinator to establish boundaries and direct movement for sensitive scenes, representing the first formal use of intimacy coaching in a Chinese television series.

== Reception ==
Hindustan Times rated 3.5/5 and stated that "The Early Spring refuses to hand viewers a sugar-coated fairy tale, and that refusal is its greatest triumph. It is a messy, emotionally intense, and highly addictive exploration of flawed people trying to navigate love and ambition. However, if you crave a mature, fast-paced romance with sizzling chemistry, complex character growth, and a beautiful cinematic style, this drama is an absolute must-watch." WION stated that "The Early Spring is presented as a workplace romance and drama, with considerable emphasis on Sun Qian's characters' professional growth rather than simply their romantic relationship."

Daily Tribune states that "The drama has quickly become one of the titles viewers are talking about, thanks to its intense workplace romance, charged boss-and-rookie dynamic, and sizzling chemistry between Jing Boran and Sun Qian." The Hindu states that "Moving away from the vanilla, saccharine sweet tropes one has come to associate with romances in many East Asian shows, The Early Spring embraces the chaos and messiness of an urban workplace relationship; one that must contend with pride, ego and, most importantly, a power imbalance." As per Papo de Dorama review "The Early Spring does not reinvent the office romance, but it finds its own personality in the way Jing Boran and Sun Qian play two people who spend far too long avoiding saying plainly what they feel."

== Soundtrack ==
The Early Spring OST
No.	Title	Lyrics	Music	Singer	Length
1.	"Passing Sunshine" (Theme Song)	Silence Wang	Silence Wang	Silence Wang	4:45
2.	"Her" (Opening Theme)	Yu Yan	Yu Yan	Liu Yuning	3:41
3.	"This Moment" (Closing Theme)	Yu Yan	Yu Yan	Tia Ray	3:34
4.	"At This Moment"	Zhang Zihan, Gao Xiaoxian	Zhang Zihan	Duan Aojuan	3:49
5.	"Lady Snow"	Yu Yan	Yu Yan	Chen Jingfei	3:44
6.	"You Are My Light"	Ding Jiayu, Xiao Mincheng	Ding Jiayu	Yang Yuqing	3:29
7.	"You Should Know"	Li Changgeng	Li Changgeng	Li Changgeng	3:43
8.	"I Will Be Beyond This World"	Yu Yan	Yu Yan	Yi Nuo	4:27
9.	"Fall Through"	Jing Ta	Chan You	Wei Bi	3:13
10.	"Crooked Philosophy"	Jing Ta	Xiao Wu Tai Tai	Wei Bi	3:43

== Ratings ==
- The Orange number represents the lowest ratings and the Blue number represents the highest ratings in China.
- Based on the average audience share per day (Yunhe Data).

Original Broadcast Date	Average Audience Share	National Ranking China
August 28, 2026	18.5%	1
August 29, 2026	23.5%	1
August 30, 2026	25.6%	1
August 31, 2026	25.3%	1
September 1, 2026	26.2%	1
September 2, 2026	27.7%	1
September 3, 2026	28.8%	1
September 4, 2026	30.2%	1
September 5, 2026	32.2%	1
September 6, 2026	33.5%	1
September 7, 2026	33.9%	1
September 8, 2026	34.8%	1
September 9, 2026	40.3%	1
Average	29.27%	
