= The Love of Hypnosis =

- Drama poster
- Also known as: Records of the Southern Mist House
- Traditional Chinese: 南煙齋筆錄
- Simplified Chinese: 南烟斋笔录
- Hanyu Pinyin: Nán Yān Zhāi Bǐ Lù
- Genre: Fantasy; Period
- Based on: Records of the Southern Mist House by Ke Xiaosha and Zuo Xiaoling
- Written by: Wu Jiuxi
- Directed by: Liu Haibo; Zhang Silin; Yip Chiu-yee; Wu Jiuxi
- Starring: Liu Yifei; Jing Boran
- Country of origin: China
- Original language: Mandarin
- No. of seasons: 1
- No. of episodes: 40

Production
- Executive producer: William Chang
- Producer: Li Na
- Production location: Hengdian World Studios
- Running time: 45 mins
- Production companies: Brandcore Entertainment; Ent. Evolution; Sky Arise Pictures; Sina Weibo; Tiandao Zhishan; Daent TV; Flying Youth Culture Media Company; Senyu Culture

The Love of Hypnosis
- Traditional Chinese: 南煙齋筆錄
- Simplified Chinese: 南烟斋笔录
Transcriptions
Standard Mandarin
- Hanyu Pinyin: Nán Yān Zhāi Bǐ Lù

The Love of Hypnosis (Chinese: 南烟斋笔录; pinyin: Nán Yānzhāi Bǐlù; lit. 'Southern Mist House Records') is a 2026 Chinese television series based on the eponymous manhua Nan Yanzhai Bilu (南烟斋笔录) by Ke Xiaosha and Zuo Xiaoling. It stars Liu Yifei and Jing Boran.

== Synopsis ==
The story begins when a white-collar worker discovers old records in her childhood home which takes the story to the end of Qing and the beginning of the Republican era. The female protagonist is a woman with a unique ability and a special mission. She can help men and women through their emotional problems and leave them with no regrets regardless of the outcome. Yet her own experience with love is not without troubles of its own.

== Cast ==
=== Main ===
Actor	Character	Introduction
Liu Yifei	Lu Mansheng	A mysterious woman who sells scents at Nanyan Studio.
Jing Boran	Ye Shen	A patriotic young man who also seems to have some sort of supernatural power.

=== Supporting ===
Actor	Character	Introduction
Zhao Lixin	Wei Zhishen	
Wei Daxun	Zhao Xinzhi	
Liu Mintao	Yun Niang	
Jin Hao	Yuan Shichen	
Zhang Hanyun	Dai Wanqing	
Xuan Lu	Yan Suwei	
Tian Xiaojie	Hua Bo	
Li Mengying	Lu Ni	
Chen Yingying	Lu Fu	
Wang Kaiyi	Song Qing	
Yi Zhixuan	Jiang Lian	
Yu Fangyi	Guang Jun	
Quan Peilun	Lin Mosheng	
Sun Qijun	Dong Xiaochuan	
Wang Kaiyi	Song Lian	

== Production ==
The series is jointly directed by four directors - Liu Haibo (Chinese Style Relationship), Zhang Silin (Precious Youth), Yip Chiu-yee (Looking Back in Anger) and Wu Jiuxi (Sunny Piggy). Wu Jiuxi, a frequent collaborater of Tsui Hark, is also the screenwriter of the series.

Principal production began on November 28, 2017, at Hengdian World Studios and wrapped up on June 15, 2018. The main location set, "Nanyan Studio" measures up to 12000 square meters (with 3500 square meters of floor area) and took three months to build from scratch. Wang Gang (Ordinary World) acts as the art director for the series. It was reported that the sets will be kept intact at Hengdian Studio even after filming for the series has completed. The costumes for the series is designed by William Chang.

The series marks Liu Yifei's comeback to the small screen after 12 years.
