= Wolf Warrior =

2015 Chinese war film

- Film poster
- Traditional Chinese: 戰狼
- Simplified Chinese: 战狼
- Literal meaning: War Wolf
- Hanyu Pinyin: Zhàn láng
- Directed by: Wu Jing
- Written by: Wu Jing; Liu Yi; Dong Qun; Gao Yan
- Produced by: Lü Jianmin (吕建民); Wu Jing; Ji Diaoqing; Shen Jingxi; Shan Chen; Ying Liang
- Starring: Wu Jing; Scott Adkins; Yu Nan; Kevin Lee
- Cinematography: Ad Zhjun
- Edited by: Zhang Jiahui
- Music by: Kian How Yoa
- Production companies: Nanking Military Area Command of the TV Art Centre; DF Pictures; Chunqiu Time Co.
- Release date: 2 April 2015
- Running time: 90 minutes
- Country: China
- Languages: Mandarin; English
- Box office: US$89.9 million

Wolf Warrior (Chinese: 战狼) is a 2015 Chinese war film written and directed by Wu Jing. It stars Wu Jing along with Scott Adkins, Yu Nan and Kevin Lee. It was released on 2 April 2015. A sequel, titled Wolf Warrior 2, was released in China in 2017 and became the all-time highest-grossing film in China.

== Plot ==
In 2008, a combined task group of People's Liberation Army Special Operations Forces and Chinese police raid a drug smuggling operation in an abandoned chemical facility in southern China. The leader of the smuggling operation, Wu Ji, holds one of his own men hostage while taking cover behind a section of the facility's reinforced wall. Leng Feng, a skilled PLA sniper, ignores orders to stand down and fires three shots at a weak section of the wall, penetrating through and killing Wu Ji. Leng Feng is sent to solitary confinement as punishment, but is approached by Long Xiaoyun, the female commander of the legendary 'Wolf Warriors', an elite unit within the PLA tasked with simulating foreign tactics for the PLA to train against. Long Xiaoyun offers Leng Feng a place in the Wolf Warriors. Meanwhile, in the Philippines, crime lord Min Deng, Wu Ji's older brother, hires ex–US Navy SEAL "Tom Cat" (Scott Adkins) and his group to kill Leng Feng and avenge his brother.

The Wolf Warriors participate in a training exercise in a remote and uninhabited forested region on China's southern border. During the exercise, Tom Cat and his mercenaries ambush a Wolf Warrior squad, killing one of Leng Feng's comrades. Subsequently, the PLA and the Wolf Warriors are tasked with hunting down Tom Cat's squad. The combined infantry force move into the forest but are delayed by multiple traps set by Tom Cat and pinned down by sniper fire until Leng Feng manages to kill the shooter. Afterwards, the rest of the PLA force engages Tom Cat's other mercenaries, who stage a fighting retreat but are eventually overwhelmed and killed. Meanwhile, Long Xiaoyun and the other PLA commanders deduce that Ming Deng himself is also in the training area to take possession of a smuggled cache of biotechnology, which could allow the creation of a genetic weapon that could target Chinese people exclusively.

Leng Feng eventually catches Tom Cat just before China's southern border. Leng Feng is nearly defeated, but manages to kill Tom Cat with his own knife. Medical personnel claiming to be from a PLA relief force arrive, but Leng Feng recognises the wrist tattoo of a medic and realizes that they are Min Deng's men in PLA uniforms. He attacks them, eventually holding Min Deng at bayonet point on the very edge of the Chinese border. Min Deng's paramilitary force approaches from the other side of the border, but so do the rest of the Wolf Warriors and PLA soldiers. Min Deng's force retreats, leaving him to be arrested.

== Cast ==
- Wu Jing as Leng Feng (Chinese: 冷锋; pinyin: Lěng Fēng), a marksman in the People's Liberation Army who was initially court martialled and reprimanded for failing to obey a direct order during an operation. He is later recruited into a Chinese Special Forces Unit called "War Wolf" after Long Xiaoyun takes an interest in him.
- Yu Nan as Lieutenant Colonel Long Xiaoyun (Chinese: 龙小云; pinyin: Lóng Xiǎoyún), Commander of the Chinese Special Forces Unit "War Wolf"
- Ni Dahong as Ming Deng, a drug lord who hires a group of foreign mercenaries to avenge his brother's death at the hands of Leng Feng.
- Scott Adkins as "Tom Cat," a former US Navy SEAL turned mercenary, who is hired by Meng Deng to kill Leng Feng
- Kevin Lee as "Mad Cow"
- Shi Zhaoqi
- Zhou Xiaoou
- Fang Zibin
- Guo Guangping
- Ru Ping
- Hong Wei
- Wang Sen
- Zhuang Xiaolong
- Chris Collins

== Production ==
The script went through 14 drafts over seven years. In order to portray more realistic combat scenes, the movie used five missiles (each at a value of one million yuan), more than 30,000 rounds of ammunition, and a variety of Chinese active military aircraft, including the Chengdu J-10, Harbin Z-9, and CAIC Z-10. In one large battle scene, 32 active tanks appeared in the same shot, including a Type 96 tank.

In order to prepare for the film, with the support of Chinese PLA Nanjing Military Region, Wu Jing trained for 18 months at a camp in Nanjing Military Region. On the first day of shooting, it was the hottest summer in Nanjing's history. The temperature was up to 49.8 °C, making 5 extra actors suffer from shock.

Most of the film was made on location in Jiangsu province, at sites including Nanjing and Sun Yat-sen Mausoleum.

== Box office ==
As of 25 May 2015, it has earned US$89.11 million in China.

In China, it opened on 2 April 2015, earning US$33.32 million in its 4-day opening weekend topping the Chinese box office. In its second weekend, it fell to number two, earning US$36.19 million (behind Furious 7).

== Critical response ==
The film had an overall rating of 6.8 on the Chinese review site Douban as of August 2017. Variety magazine wrote: "To a layperson's eyes, the military exercise does look authentic, and the cross-country skirmishes are ruggedly watchable on an acrobatic level. Yet it's impossible to overlook the inanity of the plotting".

== Awards ==
Date	Award	Category	Recipient	Result	Notes
2015	2015 Shanghai International Film Festival	Committee Special Award	Wolf Warrior	Won	
2015	30th Golden Rooster Awards	Best Film	Wolf Warrior	Nominated	
2015	30th Golden Rooster Awards	Best Editing	Zhang Jiahui	Nominated	
2016	20th Huading Awards	Best Screenplay	Wu Jing/Liu Yi/Dong Qun/Gao Yan	Won	
2016	20th Huading Awards	Best New Director	Wu Jing	Won	
2016	20th Huading Awards	Best Action Choreography	Li Zhongzhi	Won	
2016	20th Huading Awards	Number One Film Voted By Audience	Wolf Warrior	Won	
2016	20th Huading Awards	Best Productor	Lyu Jianmin	Won	
2016	33rd Hundred Flowers Awards	Outstanding Film	Wolf Warrior	Won	
2016	33rd Hundred Flowers Awards	Best Newcomer	Zhuang Xiaolong	Won	
2016	33rd Hundred Flowers Awards	Best Film	Wolf Warrior	Nominated	
2016	33rd Hundred Flowers Awards	Best Director	Wu Jing	Nominated	
2016	33rd Hundred Flowers Awards	Best Screenplay	Wu Jing/Liu Yi/Dong Qun/Gao Yan	Nominated	
2016	33rd Hundred Flowers Awards	Best Actress	Yu Nan	Nominated	
2016	16th Huabiao Awards	Outstanding Film	Wolf Warrior	Won	

== International influence ==
Wolf Warrior and its sequel, Wolf Warrior 2, are the namesake of China's aggressive 'wolf warrior diplomacy' under Xi Jinping's general secretaryship.
