= Monster Hunt 2 =

2018 Chinese-Hong Kong film by Raman Hui

- Theatrical release poster
- Traditional Chinese: 捉妖記2
- Simplified Chinese: 捉妖记2
- Literal meaning: tale of catching demons 2
- Hanyu Pinyin: Zhuō yāo jì 2
- Directed by: Raman Hui
- Screenplay by: Jack Ng; Sunny Chan; Su Liang
- Based on: Strange Stories from a Chinese Studio by Pu Songling
- Produced by: Bill Kong; Yee Chung-man; Doris Tse
- Starring: Tony Leung; Bai Baihe; Jing Boran; Li Yuchun; Tony Yang
- Cinematography: Anthony Pun
- Edited by: David Richardson
- Music by: Leon Ko
- Production company: Edko Films
- Release date: February 16, 2018 (China)
- Running time: 110 minutes
- Countries: China; Hong Kong
- Languages: Mandarin; Cantonese
- Budget: RMB 900 million (US$143 million)
- Box office: US$361.7 million

Monster Hunt 2 is a 2018 fantasy comedy adventure film directed by Raman Hui. A Chinese-Hong Kong co-production, it stars Tony Leung, Bai Baihe, Jing Boran, Li Yuchun and Tony Yang. A sequel to 2015's Monster Hunt, the film was released in mainland China and Hong Kong on February 16, 2018.

== Plot ==
Wuba is on a journey through monster realm, dodging the dark forces of an evil monster king, as he endeavor to restore peace to the monster world. Wuba meets Tu and BenBen, a human-monster team that rescues Wuba many times. Meanwhile, Huo and Song are in search of Wuba and reach Monster Hunter Bureau. They upgrade their weapons and find new friends. In the end, all of them fight, rescuing Wuba from the evil monsters. Finally, Wuba is reunited with its family.

== Cast ==
- Tony Leung as Tu Sigu
- Bai Baihe as Huo Xiaolan
- Jing Boran as Song Tianyin
- Li Yuchun as Zhu Jinzhen
- Tony Yang as Yunqing
- Huang Lei as Physician
- Sandra Ng as Ying
- Eric Tsang as Zhugao
- Wu Mochou as Xiaobaozi
- Babyjohn Choi as Ben Ben
- Song Xiaobao
- Da Peng
- Liu Yan
- X NINE

== Production ==
Following the success of the first film, Edko Films upped the production phase of the sequel by doubling the number of visual effects shots, adding more monsters, building bigger sets, boosting merchandising output and marketing alliances, and adding veteran star Tony Leung to the cast.

Principal photography began in Beijing in October 2016. The film took three years to complete compared to the seven years taken by the first film.

The visual effects were rendered by half a dozen companies and required a multinational effort, Industrial Light & Magic and Whiskytree from the U.S., and China's BaseFX in Beijing, Original Force in Nanjing, Trouper Visual Effects in Shanghai and CGCG in Taiwan.

== Soundtrack ==
No.	Title	Lyrics	Music	Performer(s)	Length
1.	"Stand Up" (什么什么)	Xu Qi	Hanif Hitmanic Sabzevari, Dennis DeKo Kordnejad, Pontus PJ Ljung, Daniel Kim	Jolin Tsai	3:20
Total length:					3:20

== Marketing ==
Edko Films tied-up with many licensing partners for marketing the film. They partnered with Alibaba on merchandising, and with Chimelong, China's largest domestic theme park, for developing theme park attractions inspired by the franchise. They also partnered with SM Supermalls, China's biggest mall. Moreover, Lionsgate is discussing Monster Hunt attraction in the Middle East.

== Release ==
The film was released in China and Hong Kong on February 16, 2018 to coincide with Chinese New Year. It was screened at the 68th Berlin International Film Festival at the out-of-competition category.

At the 2018 Cannes Film Festival, Lionsgate acquired rights to its North American and UK theatrical distribution as well as rights to the property's location-based entertainment venues in select territories. The film was released day-and-date in North America along with its Chinese release. Lionsgate secured 70 screens there for its opening.

== Reception ==
=== Box office ===
Buoyed by the groundbreaking success of the first film and its impact on China's cinema, its sequel was highly anticipated by audiences and was already envisioned to be a huge commercial success following the footsteps of its predecessor. Moreover, the film was released during the lucrative Chinese New Year period which aided the sequel in its continued success despite heavy competitions. In its hometown market, the film pre-sold around US$7.8 million tickets for its opening day (which later grew to RMB70.6 million or US$11.3 million fourteen days shy of release), seventeen days ahead of its premiere. By comparison, Journey to the West: The Demons Strike Back and The Mermaid hit that mark three and four days prior to their release respectively. At around 7:30 pm (GMT) of its opening day, ticket sales surpassed those of The Fate of the Furious to record the biggest opening day in the Middle Kingdom. On its full opening day, the film earned an estimated RMB545 million (US$85.9 million), setting a new single day box office record and occupying 44% of the market share. It is also the fourth biggest single-day in any territory behind the North American openings of Star Wars: The Force Awakens (US$119 million), its sequel, Star Wars: The Last Jedi (US$105 million) and Harry Potter and the Deathly Hallows – Part 2 (US$91 million). Including ticketing fees, the opening was worth RMB603 million (US$95.7 million), while others reported US$97 million. The Hollywood Reporter noted that had there been less to no competition, the film would've broken the all-time opening day record. The film topped the daily box office for two days but was eventually overtaken by Detective Chinatown 2 on its third day.

Earning a total of RMB1.14 billion (US$178.7 million) or US$190 million including online ticket surcharges, it broke a new all-time opening weekend in the country, topping Wolf Warrior 2's previous record, and securing 81% of the weekend total box office. An estimated US$7 million alone came from IMAX showings. The film along with the combined grosses of Detective Chinatown 2 (US$154 million), The Monkey King 3: Kingdom of Women (US$79.9 million), Operation Red Sea (US$70.3 million) and Boonie Bears: The Big Shrink (US$40.9 million) amounted to a record breaking RMB3.21 billion (US$506 million) or US$543 million weekend with online ticket sales, which is more than double the feat achieved in 2017 (US$205 million) and 2016 (US$224 million) during the same time period. The previous weekend record was set in North America during the weekend of December 18–20, 2017, when the combined grosses of several films resulted in US$306 million led by Star Wars: The Force Awakens's US$248 million debut. Moreover, the combined IMAX earnings of the three films also set a new record with US$15.1 million, led by Monster Hunt 2 and Detective Chinatown 2 (US$6.7 million).

In the United States and Canada, the film made US$120,000 on its opening day from 70 screens, and US$335,000 over its opening weekend.

=== Critical reception ===
The film received an average rating of 8.5 out of 10 by moviegoers on Maoyan. On Rotten Tomatoes, the film has an approval rating of 50% based on 10 reviews, and an average rating of 5.1/10.

== Future ==
Hui and producer Kong have a story planned out through a fourth film. The two told The Hollywood Reporter in February 2018 that they plan to make an animated film after the fourth one which could serve as a potential spin-off.
