= Sun Qian (actress) =

Chinese actress (born 1997)

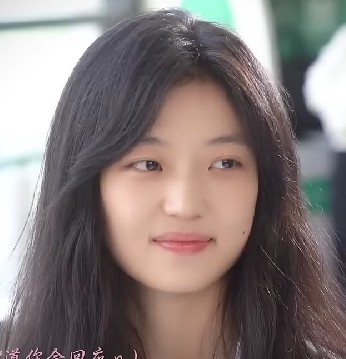
- Sun in 2024
- Born: April 18, 1997 (age 29); Harbin, Heilongjiang, China
- Education: Central Academy of Drama
- Occupations: Actress; Model
- Years active: 2018–present
- Agent: Enlight Media
- Notable work: He Yuanzi in Meteor Garden; Cheng Miaomiao in Wind Direction; Lu Yan in Love Song in Winter; Shang Zhitao in The Early Spring
- Height: 172 cm (5 ft 8 in)

Chinese name
- Simplified Chinese: 孙千
Transcriptions
Standard Mandarin
- Hanyu Pinyin: Sūn Qiān
- Website: iQIYI • Viki

Sun Qian (Chinese: 孙千, born 18 April 1997) is a Chinese actress and model. She is known for roles in the series Meteor Garden, Wind Direction, Love Song in Winter, Love Story in the 1970s, and The Early Spring .

== Early life ==
Sun Qian was born in Harbin city, China; and is of Han descent. She was raised by a single mother employed in the wellness sector. Before pursuing acting, she trained in ballet for seven years at the high school affiliated with the Beijing Dance Academy. She graduated from the Central Academy of Drama, majoring in Acting.

== Career ==
=== 2018–2023: Beginning ===
In 2018, Sun debuted in the entertainment industry by starring in the comedy series Take My Brother Away, adaptation of a Chinese manhua of the same name by author You Ling. She played a supporting role in the romantic drama Meteor Garden, a Chinese adaptation of the Japanese manga Hana Yori Dango by Yoko Kamio, where her performance received notable response.

In 2019, Sun starred in the film Love the Way You Are; in fantasy drama I'm Waiting for You in the Future, and in the campus inspirational drama Lady's Flying Fist. Additionally, she starred in the historical romantic comedy Dr. Cutie, romantic drama Way Back into Love, and in the emotional drama Remembrance of Things Past. In 2022, she starred in the inspirational drama Wild Bloom, which earned critical acclaim and high Douban ratings.

=== 2024–2025: Breakthrough ===
In 2024, Sun drew widespread recognition in the youth drama Wind Direction, marking her shift into subtly nuanced artistry. She also starred in Love Song in Winter, alongside Huang Jingyu, it surpassed 9,000 popularity index points on iQIYI, and consistently ranked 1st in China. In 2025, her historical drama Legend of the Magnate alongside Chen Xiao, recorded an overall rating of 3.5% on CCTV-8, and exceeded over 8,500 popularity index points on IQIYI.

=== 2026–present: Rising popularity ===
In 2026, Sun starred in the suspense drama The Guilty alongside Wei Daxun, a sleeper hit that earned high Douban ratings. Her retro drama Love Story in the 1970s alongside Arthur Chen, exceeded popularity index of 28,000 on Tencent. Her romantic series The Early Spring alongside Jing Boran ranked 4th worldwide in Netflix and achieved 10,000 popularity index threshold on Youku. Her upcoming drama is a forensic based Detective Hours: In Our Prime alongside Bai Jingting.

== Influence ==
Sun is a brand ambassador for Celine, a French fashion brand; she participated in Paris Fashion Week as an Asian celebrity endorsing Balenciaga, a Spanish luxury fashion brand. In 2025, she was ranked 6th in the "Most Admired Post '95 Chinese Actress". She is a well known celebrity and fashion icon, frequently featured in the brand campaigns and renowned magazines like Chicteen, Elle, and Cosmopolitan. In November 2025, she became a brand ambassador for Blue Erdos and participated in its Fall-Winter collections campaign in Shanghai. In 2026, a Chinese skincare brand Fuerjia, and South Korean sports brand FILA announced her as its ambassador.

== Filmography ==
=== Film ===
Year	Title	Role	Note	Ref.
2019	Love the Way You Are	Xu Jie'er	Supporting Role	
2021	Lost and Found	Cui Xi	Supporting Role	
2023	All These Years	Chen Jianxia	Main Role	
2023	Love Machine	Wei Shuang	Sci-Fi Anthology Short Film	
2023	The Future Handbook	Wei Shuang	Sci-Fi Anthology Short Film	
2023	Love Life Light	Liu Jiayi	Supporting Role	

=== TV series ===
Year	English title	Chinese title	Role	Notes	Ref.
2018	Take My Brother Away	快把我哥帶走	Shi Miao	Main role	
2018	Meteor Garden	流星花园	He Yuanzi	Supporting role	
2019	Waiting for You in the Future	我在未来等你	Wang Xiaowei	Supporting role	
2019	Sweet Tai Chi	淑女飘飘拳	Feng Piaopiao	Main role	
2020	Dr. Cutie	萌医甜妻	Tian Qi	Main role	
2020	Way Back into Love	拾光里的我们	Lu Jia	Main role	
2021	Remembrance of Things Past	我在他乡挺好的	Xu Yan	Main role	
2021	Mystery of Antiques 3	古董局中局之掠宝清单	Student	Guest role	
2022	A Robot in the Orange Orchard	你好呀，我的橘子恋人	Yang Shanshan	Main role	
2022	Wild Bloom	风吹半夏	Gao Xinyi	Main role	
2024	19th Floor	19层	Chun Yu	Main role	
2024	Islands	烟火人家	Tao Shuna	Supporting role	
2024	Wind Direction	迎风的青春	Cheng Miaomiao	Main role	
2024	Love Song in Winter	冬至	Lu Yan	Main role	
2025	What a Wonderful World	在人间	Liu Tiaoer	Guest role	
2025	Legend of the Magnate	大生意人	Chang Yuer	Main role	
2026	The Guilty	无罪之身	Xia Xue	Main role	
2026	Love Story in the 1970s	实用主义者的爱情	Fei Ni	Main role	
2026	The Early Spring	早春晴朗	Shang Zhitao / Flora Shang	Main role	
TBA	Extreme Punishment Suit	心诉	Luo Xun	Main role	
TBA	Love the Moon	月下烟火	Fang Long	Main role	
TBA	Detective Hours: In Our Prime	刑警时刻之风华正茂	Fang Kunyu	Main role	
TBA	The Queen of Brilliance	璀璨之上	Zhou Tianna	Main role	

=== Variety shows ===
Year	Title	Note	Ref.
2020	Everybody Stand By; Season:2	Regular Member	
2023	The Detectives' Adventures; Season:3	Regular Member	
2025	Natural High; Season:3 Ep:1,2	Guest	
2026	Natural High; Season:4 Ep:	Guest	

== Discography ==
=== Soundtrack appearances ===
Year	Song title	Note
2019	"A Tearful Decision"	I'm Waiting for You in the Future OST

== Awards and nominations ==
Year	Award Title	Category	Work	Status	Ref.
2020	Huading Awards	Best New Performer	I'm Waiting for You in the Future	Nominated	
2021	Hengdian Film Festival of China	Best Actress	Remembrance of Things Past	Nominated	
2022	China TV Drama Awards	Outstanding Actress	Wild Bloom	Won	
2024	iQIYI Scream Night	Breakthrough Actress of the Year	Wind Direction	Won	
2024	Weibo Awards Ceremony	Expected Actress of the Year		Won	
2024	Weibo Awards Ceremony	Leap Actress of the Year	Wind Direction	Won	
2024	Weibo Awards Ceremony	Promising Actress of the Year	All These Years	Won	
2026	The 4th China TV Drama Annual Ceremony	Breakthrough Actress of the Year	Legend of the Magnate	Won	
