= Back Dorm Boys =

Chinese entertainer duo

- Born: Guangzhou, China
- Occupations: Lip sync artists, singers
- Years active: 2005–2011

Chinese name
- Simplified Chinese: 后舍男生
- Traditional Chinese: 後舍男生
Transcriptions
Standard Mandarin
- Hanyu Pinyin: Hòushè Nánshēng
- Musical career
- Also known as: Back Dormitory Boys; Two Chinese Boys; Asian Backstreet Boys; Chinese Backstreet Boys; Tow Chinese Boys [sic]
- Origin: Guangzhou, China
- Genres: Mandopop
- Members: Wei Wei; Huang Yixin
- Website: Official Site

The Back Dorm Boys were a Chinese duo who gained fame in 2005 for their lip sync videos to songs by the Backstreet Boys and other pop stars. Their videos, captured on a low quality web cam in their college dorm room, have been viewed by Internet users within China and around the world. Many of their videos can be seen on YouTube, giving them YouTube fame. The two, Wei Wei (simplified Chinese: 韦炜; traditional Chinese: 韋煒; pinyin: Wéi Wěi) and Huang Yixin (simplified Chinese: 黄艺馨; traditional Chinese: 黃藝馨; pinyin: Huáng Yìxīn), were sculpture majors at the Guangzhou Academy of Fine Arts (simplified Chinese: 广州美术学院; traditional Chinese: 廣州美術學院; pinyin: Gǔangzhōu Měishù Xuéyuàn).

== Career ==
The Back Dorm Boys initially began making videos to show to their friends. They took their inspiration from a funny 10-second lip sync video that they watched, creating a video of themselves lip-syncing to an entire song. They completed their first video in March 2005, after much trial and error, uploading the finished video to the local network at their college. The other students liked it so much that they helped to spread the video more widely.

While still at school, the Back Dorm Boys were signed as spokespeople for Motorola cellphones in China and eventually become host of Motorola's online lip-sync contests. They also signed a contract with Sina.com, one of the largest Chinese Internet portals as bloggers and podcasters. The Back Dorm Boys maintain a Chinese-language blog through Sina.com. In 2006, they received "The Best Podcaster Award" from Sina.com.

In February 2006, a few months before they graduated, the Back Dorm Boys signed a five-year contract with Taihe Rye Music, a talent management company in Beijing, to continue making lip-sync videos as well as to appear in commercials for major brands such as Pepsi. They went to Beijing to build their own Studio Video and Multimedia Arts. They also began studying singing, dancing, and stage arts with Taihe Rye.

The group has known to have made use of their art school education to help them prepare the composition, visual effects, and lighting in their videos.
