= Raman Hui =

Hong Kong animator and film director

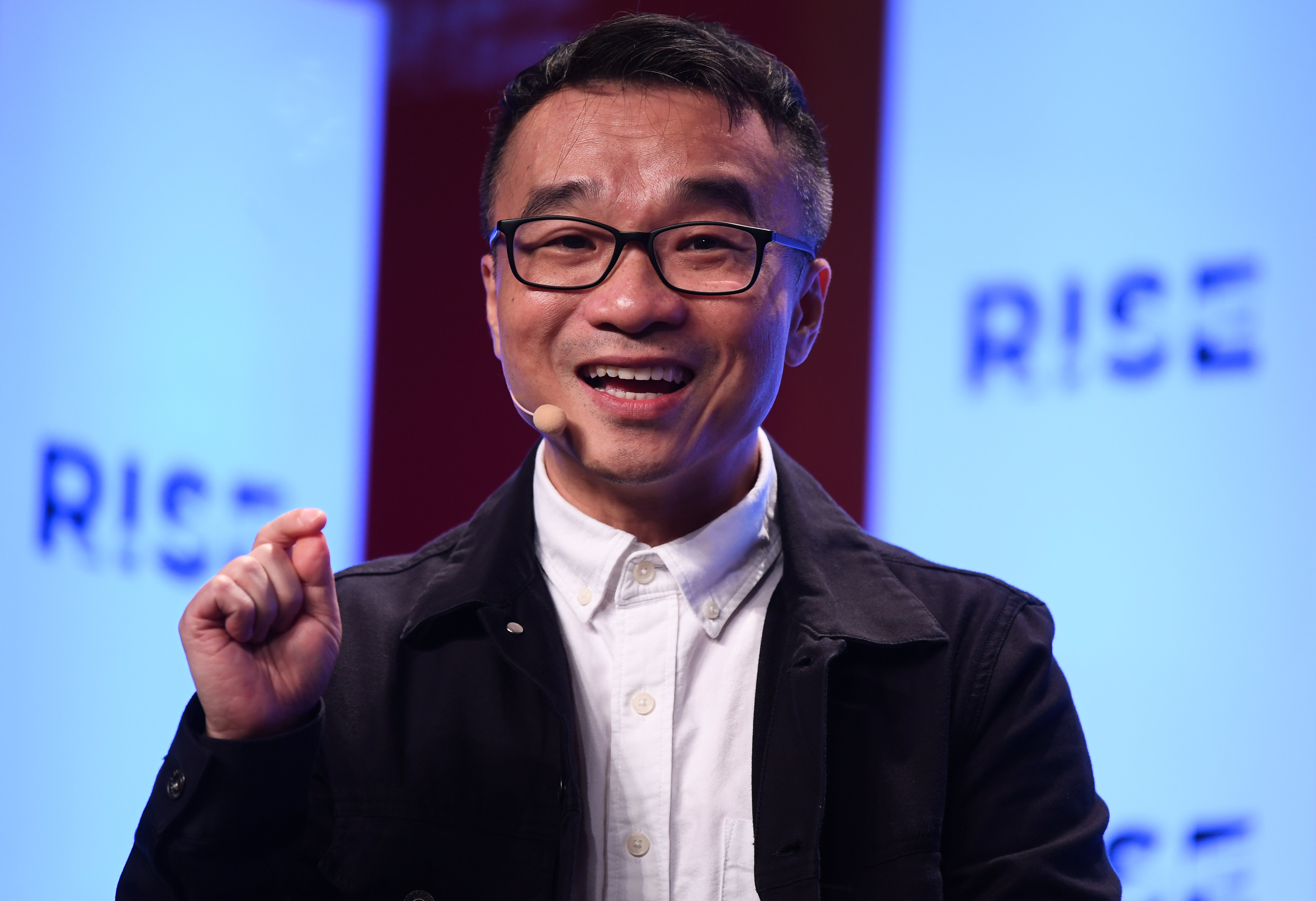
- Hui in 2019
- Born: Raman Hui Shing-Ngai; 4 July 1963 (age 63); Hong Kong
- Occupations: Animator, film director, film producer
- Notable work: Monster Hunt, Monster Hunt 2

Raman Hui Shing-Ngai (Traditional Chinese: 許誠毅, born 4 July 1963) is a Hong Kong animator, film director, and film producer. He is best known for directing the films Monster Hunt and Monster Hunt 2.

== Early life ==
Hui was born in Hong Kong, and grew up in a single parent family, with his mother raising him and two other siblings. Liking to draw since he could remember, he went to Hong Kong Polytechnic University where he graduated in 1984 in graphic design.

== Career ==
After graduation, he worked as a cel animator at Quantum Studios in Hong Kong. In 1989, he moved to Canada to attend a three-month course at Sheridan College to improve his knowledge in computer animation. For a while he was creating hand-drawn animated productions for TV commercials in Toronto. In 1989, Hui started working as a junior animator at Pacific Data Images, which was later acquired by DreamWorks Animation. There, he worked on various commercials and short films. Among other work, he directed two short films, Sleepy Guy (1995), and Fat Cat on a Diet (2000). He was the supervising animator and lead character designer on PDI's first feature film, Antz, released in 1998. From there he went on to serve as supervising animator for Shrek and Shrek 2. In 2004, he spent half a year in Hong Kong where he directed animation for the DreamWorks Animation's televisions series Father of the Pride, which was subcontracted to a Hong Kong company. In 2007, he co-directed his first feature film, Shrek the Third. He also directed three short films, Kung Fu Panda: Secrets of the Furious Five, Scared Shrekless and Puss in Boots: The Three Diablos.

Hui illustrated several children story books in collaboration with Kiehl's to raise funds for various Hong Kong organisations. His first book, Brownie and Sesame was released in 2004, followed by Piccolo in 2005 and Grandma Long Ears in 2006.

Due to his contributions to the Shrek films, Forbes listed Hui in 2010 among 25 notable Chinese-Americans in the business field.

Hui said of himself that he is a "Hong Konger living in America," being "sandwiched between Western and Chinese cultures." After arriving to the United States, beside learning a new language, Hui had most troubles adapting to a different lifestyle: "Hong Kong is a busy place. But the place I lived, Silicon Valley, was so quiet that if you see someone walking down the street at night, you should feel worried." Although, he prefers living in Hong Kong, Hui prefers working in the United States: "They make sure you have enough time to do your job well. I feel attached to that country because it is where I learned all my skills."

== Filmography ==
=== Director ===
Short film

- Sleepy Guy (1994)
- Fat Cat on a Diet (1999)
- Kung Fu Panda: Secrets of the Furious Five (2008)
- Puss in Boots: The Three Diablos (2012)

Feature film

- Shrek the Third (2007)
- Monster Hunt (2015)
- Monster Hunt 2 (2018)
- The Tiger's Apprentice (2024)

TV special

- Scared Shrekless (2010)

=== Animator ===
Short film

- Muppet*Vision 3D (1991)
- Fat Cat on a Diet (1999)

Feature film

- Madagascar (2005) (Additional)

TV special

- The Last Halloween (1991) (Character animator)
- Shrek the Halls (2007)
- Merry Madagascar (2009)

TV series

- The Simpsons (1995) (Episode "Treehouse of Horror VI")

==== Animation director ====
Film

- Angels in the Outfield (1994)
- The Arrival (1996) (Pacific Data Images)

Television

- Father of the Pride (2004-2005)
- How to Train Your Dragon (2012)

==== Supervising animator ====
- Antz (1998)
- Shrek (2001)
- Batman Forever (1995) (Pacific Data Images)
- Shrek 4-D (2003)
- Shrek 2 (2004) (Also additional storyboard artist)

=== Story artist ===
Short film

- Donkey's Caroling Christmas-tacular (2010)

Feature film

- Shrek Forever After (2010) (Additional)
- Puss in Boots (2011) (Additional)

TV special

- Merry Madagascar (2009)

=== Character designer ===
- Antz (1998)
- Shrek (2001)

=== Voice actor ===
- Sinbad: Legend of the Seven Seas (2003) (As Jin)
