= Monster Hunt =

2015 Chinese-Hong Kong film by Raman Hui

- Chinese theatrical release poster
- Traditional Chinese: 捉妖記
- Simplified Chinese: 捉妖记
- Literal meaning: Tale of catching demon slayer
- Hanyu Pinyin: zhuō yāo jì
- Directed by: Raman Hui
- Written by: Alan Yuen
- Based on: Strange Stories from a Chinese Studio by Pu Songling
- Produced by: Bill Kong; Alan Yuen; Yee Chung-man; Doris Tse
- Starring: Bai Baihe; Jing Boran; Jiang Wu; Wallace Chung; Elaine Jin; Eric Tsang; Sandra Ng
- Cinematography: Anthony Pun
- Edited by: Cheung Ka-fai
- Music by: Leon Ko
- Production companies: Dream Sky Entertainment; Beijing Digital Impression Media; Tencent Video; Heyi Pictures; Beijing Union Pictures; Zhejiang Xinghe Culture Agency; Zhejiang Sanle Pictures; Zhejiang Film and TV; EDKO; Guanxing Entertainment
- Distributed by: China Film Group Corporation; EDKO (Beijing) Distribution Co. Tianjin Lianrui Pictures Co. Union Pictures; Central Partnership; Sony Pictures Releasing; Union Pictures; Viva International Pictures; Alive Vertrieb und Marketing; Falcom Media; FilmRise; GEM Entertainment; IPA Asia Pacific
- Release date: July 16, 2015
- Running time: 118 minutes
- Countries: China; Hong Kong
- Language: Mandarin
- Budget: US$56 million (Note: The original production budget of the film was US$40 million (excluding marketing, publicity and advertising costs). However, due to reshoots the budget climbed up to about US$56 million.)
- Box office: US$387 million

Monster Hunt (Chinese: 捉妖记) is a 2015 3D fantasy action comedy adventure film directed by Raman Hui (in his feature directorial debut). A Chinese-Hong Kong co-production, the film was released in China on 16 July 2015 in 3D and IMAX 3D.

Upon release, it became a huge commercial success, breaking numerous box office records, including the highest-grossing film in China, before The Mermaid took the crown in 2016. It opened in North America on January 22, 2016 in 2D and 3D by FilmRise.

A sequel, Monster Hunt 2, was released in China in 2018.

== Plot ==
The film takes place in ancient China, where the Humans existed alongside the Monsters. They once shared the world in peace and harmony until the Humans drove the Monsters out from their home, for they sought total dominion over their lands. Recently, a civil war took place in the Monster Realm which resulted in the usurpation of the Monster King's throne from a treacherous minister, who later sought the Monster Queen and her unborn baby, and the Monster Queen fled to the Human Realm. The story begins with Song Tianyin, an unnerved young village mayor who becomes pregnant with the Monster Queen's baby, and he encounters an aspiring Monster-hunter named Huo Xiaolan, and they both embark on an adventure to protect the baby from villains of the Human and Monster worlds alike.

== Cast ==
- Bai Baihe as Huo Xiaolan
- Jing Boran as Song Tianyin
- Jiang Wu as Luo Gang
- Elaine Jin as grandmother
- Wallace Chung as Ge Qianhu
- Eric Tsang as Gao
- Sandra Ng as Ying
- Tang Wei as pawn shop owner
- Yao Chen as chef
- Yan Ni as Luo Ying
- Bao Jianfeng as Zheng Tao
- Wang Yuexin as Xiao Wu
- Guo Xiaodong as Song Tianyin's father
- Li Jingjing as Mama Li
- Cindy Tian as Rainy
- Zhang Yuexuan as Sky

== Themes ==
The main theme in Monster Hunt, according to Hui is acceptance (similar to the Shrek series which Hui was involved in). The message in the film is to understand and accept differences, to see the world through others' perspective and to foster more understanding between people and groups.

== Production ==
=== Development ===
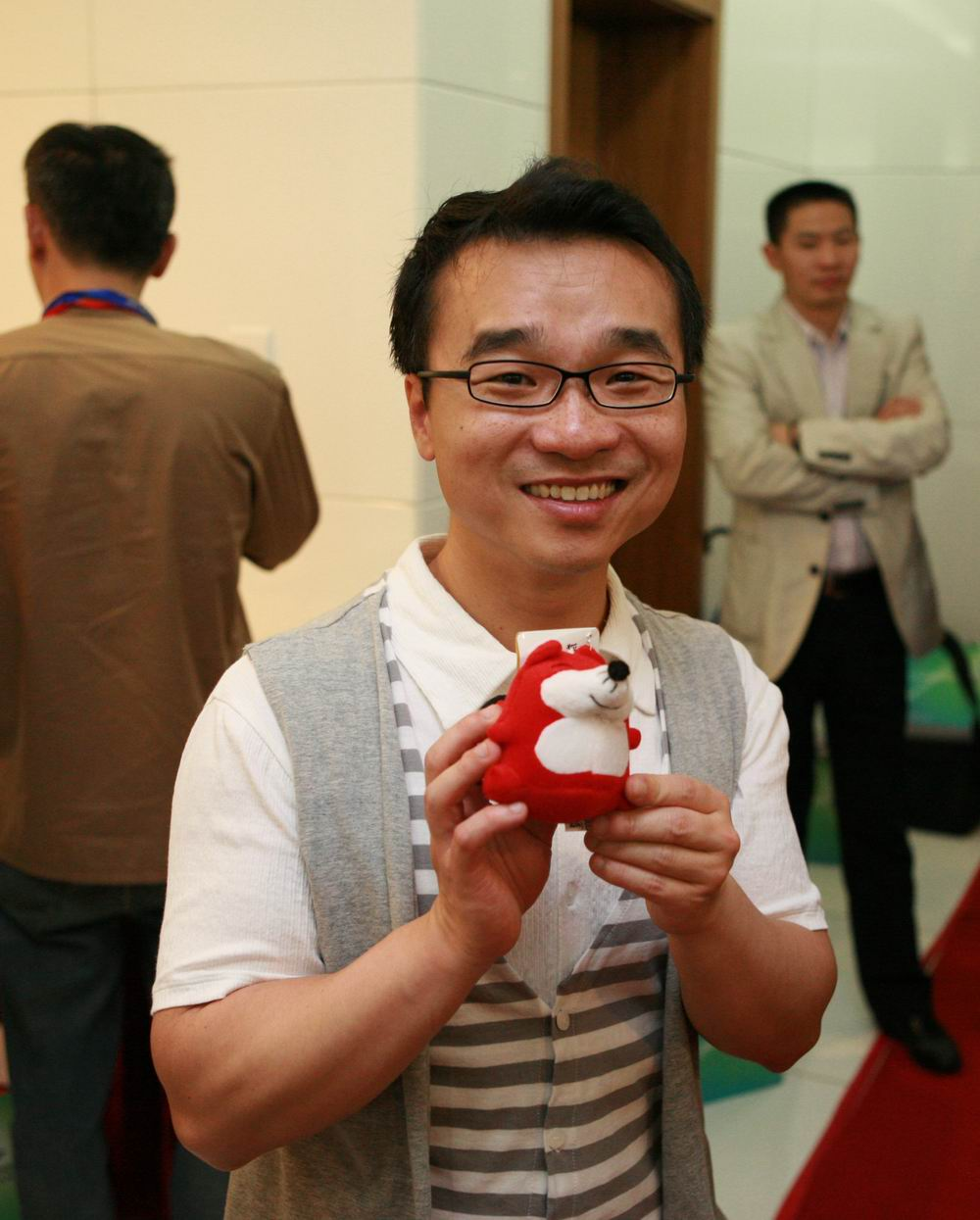
Raman Hui directed the film, which is his first live action directorial debut.

Hui had long wanted to produce a movie in China. In an interview with the South China Morning Post he said that while overseeing sequences for the Gingerbread Man character in Shrek, he daydreamed about animating a character from a Hong Kong bakery, a Pineapple Bun Man. The idea for the film began in 2005 when Hui—who was living in Hollywood at that time—approached producer Bill Kong on the possibility of making an animated movie in China. But Kong who had no experience with animated film turned the proposal down. The two, who had known each other for 20 years, met as Kong used to distribute movies for DreamWorks Animation in China. But about three years later in 2008, Kong, while visiting Hollywood, invited Hui out for drinks on Sunset Boulevard and asked him if he could make a live-action film with computer graphics for him. Hui, who hadn't done any live-action movies simply said, "Sure, I'll give it a try." Kong introduced Hui to Hong Kong writer Alan Yuen to see what they could come up with. They started looking for comic books or other intellectual property to adapt, but to no avail. Alan finished the script alone by the summer of 2009 taking vague inspiration from monsters mentioned in classical Chinese literature, but with an original story.

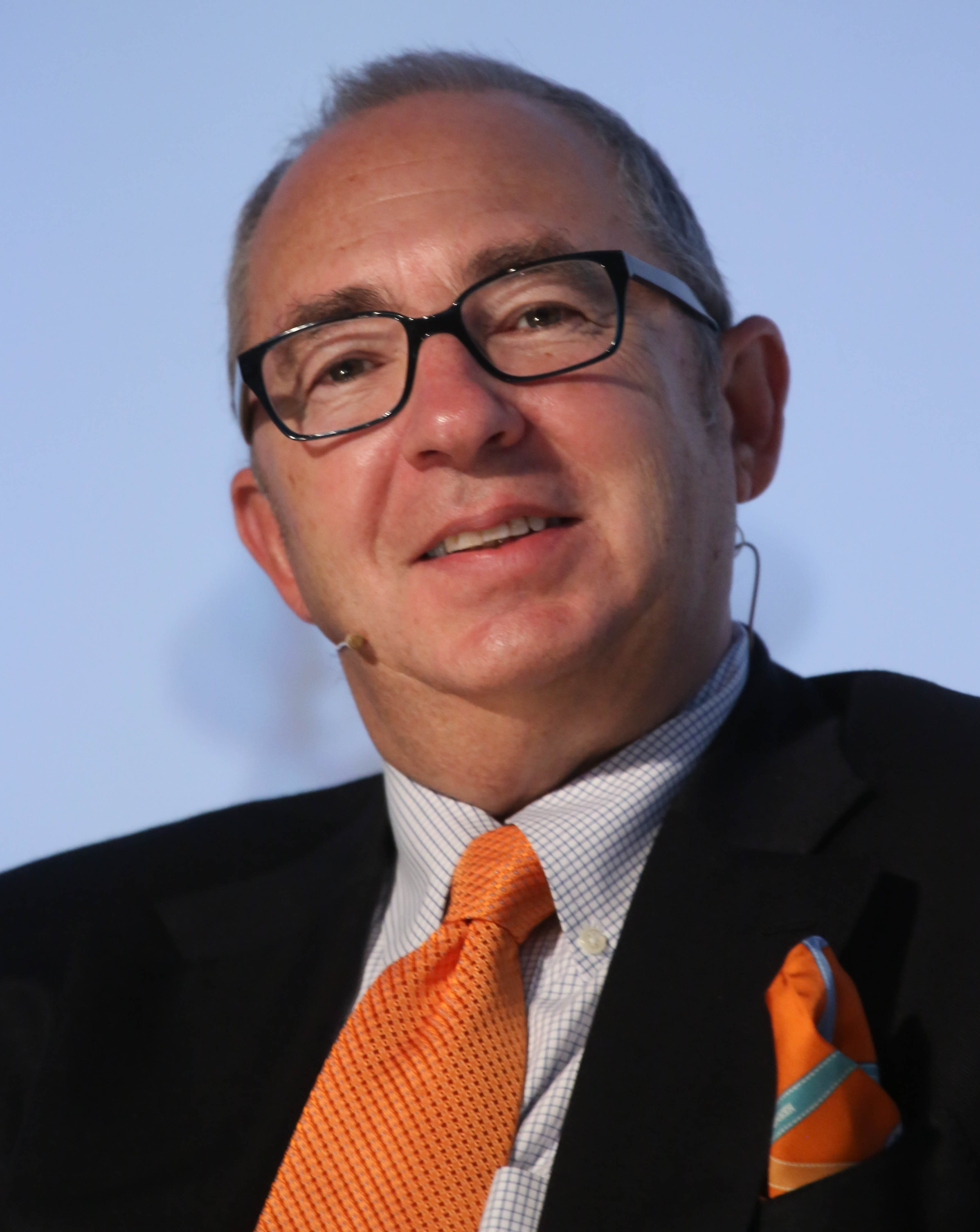
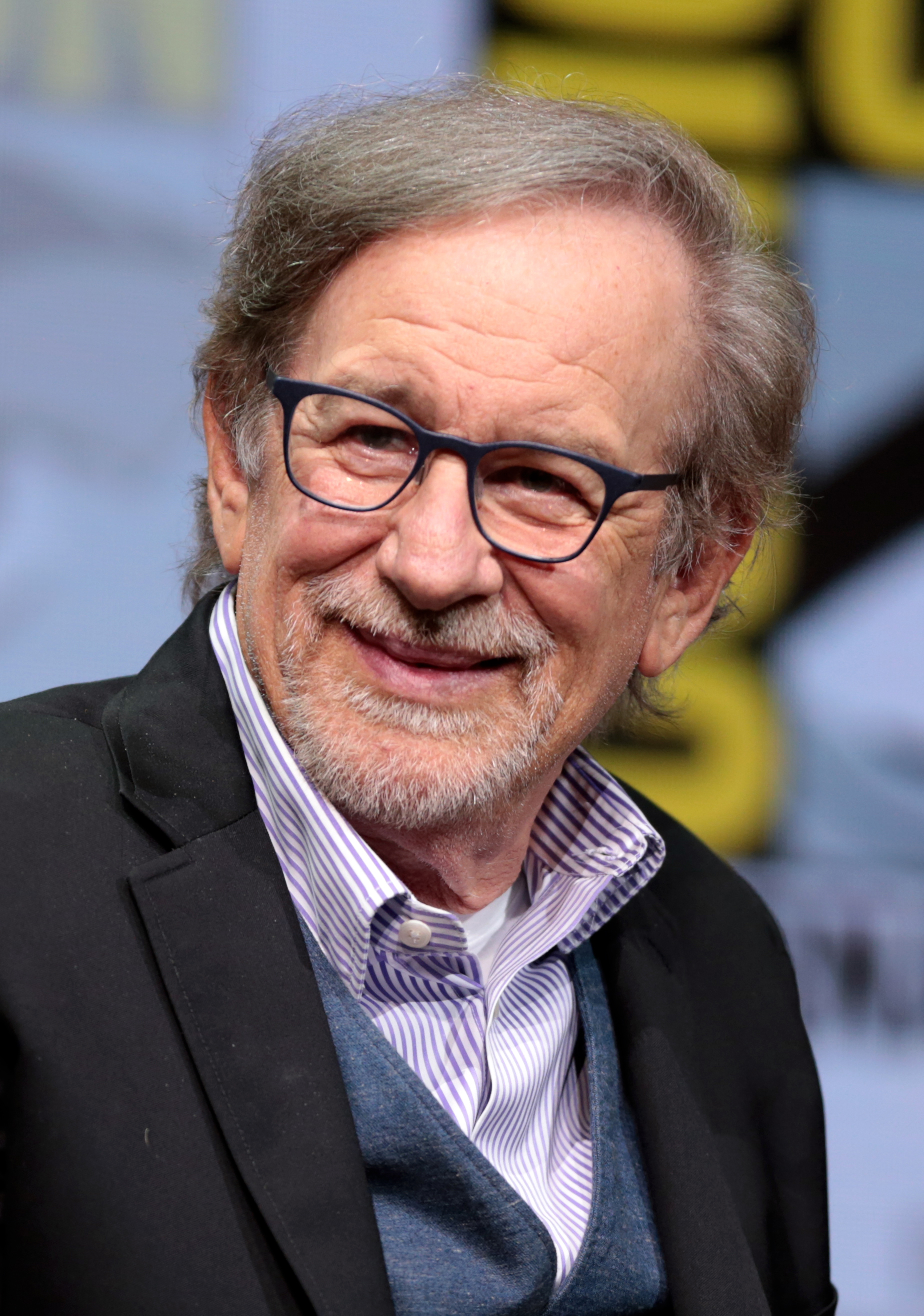
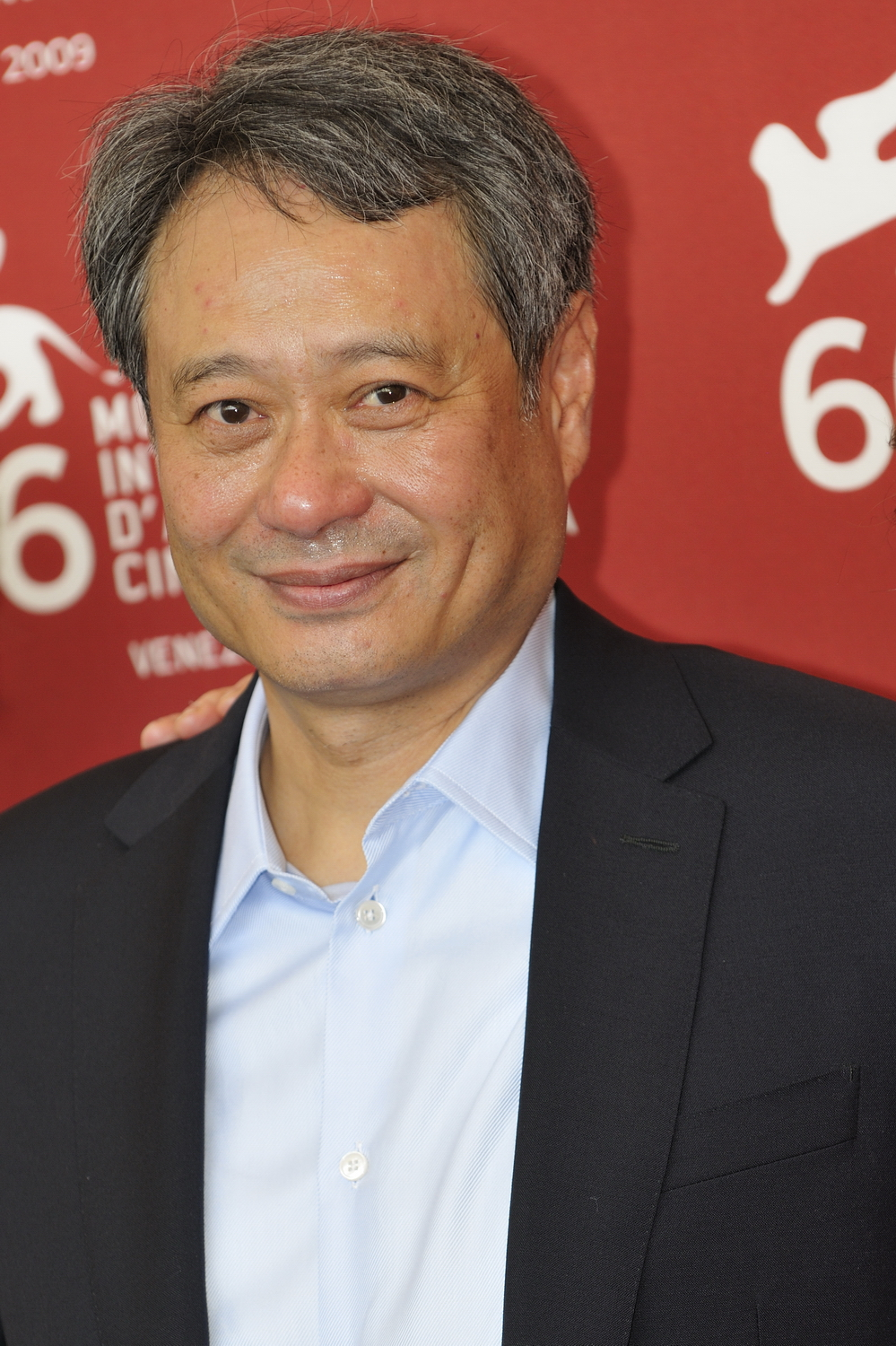
The film is partly influenced by Hollywood movies such as Men in Black, Jurassic Park, and Chinese movie Crouching Tiger, Hidden Dragon; directed by Barry Sonnenfeld, Steven Spielberg and Ang Lee, respectively.

The three took inspiration from an old Chinese book "Classic of Mountains and Seas" (Shan Hai Jing). "It's a weird book from old China, a bit like Nat Geo [National Geographic] with descriptions of monsters living in the mountains. I kind of based the monsters on the descriptions in that book." Hui said. Although Hui admits that there wasn't any particular film he drew inspiration from for the film, he stated that Monster Hunt is partly influenced by various DreamWorks animated movies, Hollywood movies such as Men in Black, Jurassic Park, Crouching Tiger, Hidden Dragon, The Lord of the Rings film series and Indiana Jones franchise, Hong Kong films like CJ7 and Drunken Master II, works of Steven Spielberg and James Cameron and visual references at once recalling ancient Chinese landscape painting, a 1970s breakfast cereal called Freakies, and the Oddball Art of Mark Ryden. Kong took the first draft of the script to many friends in the film industry and all of the feedback was that it had potential but it would be too tough to make since the film would need visual effects because of its depiction of monsters. Finally, Hui and Yuen went to a Beijing-based visual effects house, Base FX, and made a four-minute test film in 2012. That gave the team confidence to move ahead.

Before Hui went to China, DreamWorks Animation sent him to India for 2 years. Upon arriving in China in early 2013, he began assembling his crew, even as he continued to do consulting work for DreamWorks Animation. On the experience of working in a live-action film Hui said, "It was all new to me. I still recall I was so excited to see a costume being made. Before that, all the Shrek costumes were inside a computer. You can't touch it. For this movie, you could touch the fabric. It was like a toy shop, so exciting." Hui and his team decided to make the monsters in the film look more friendly, humanlike and anthropomorphic—in contrary to typical monsters being vicious and scary—because they wanted them to carry emotions and get attached with the audience and the audience to liken the monsters.

=== Filming ===
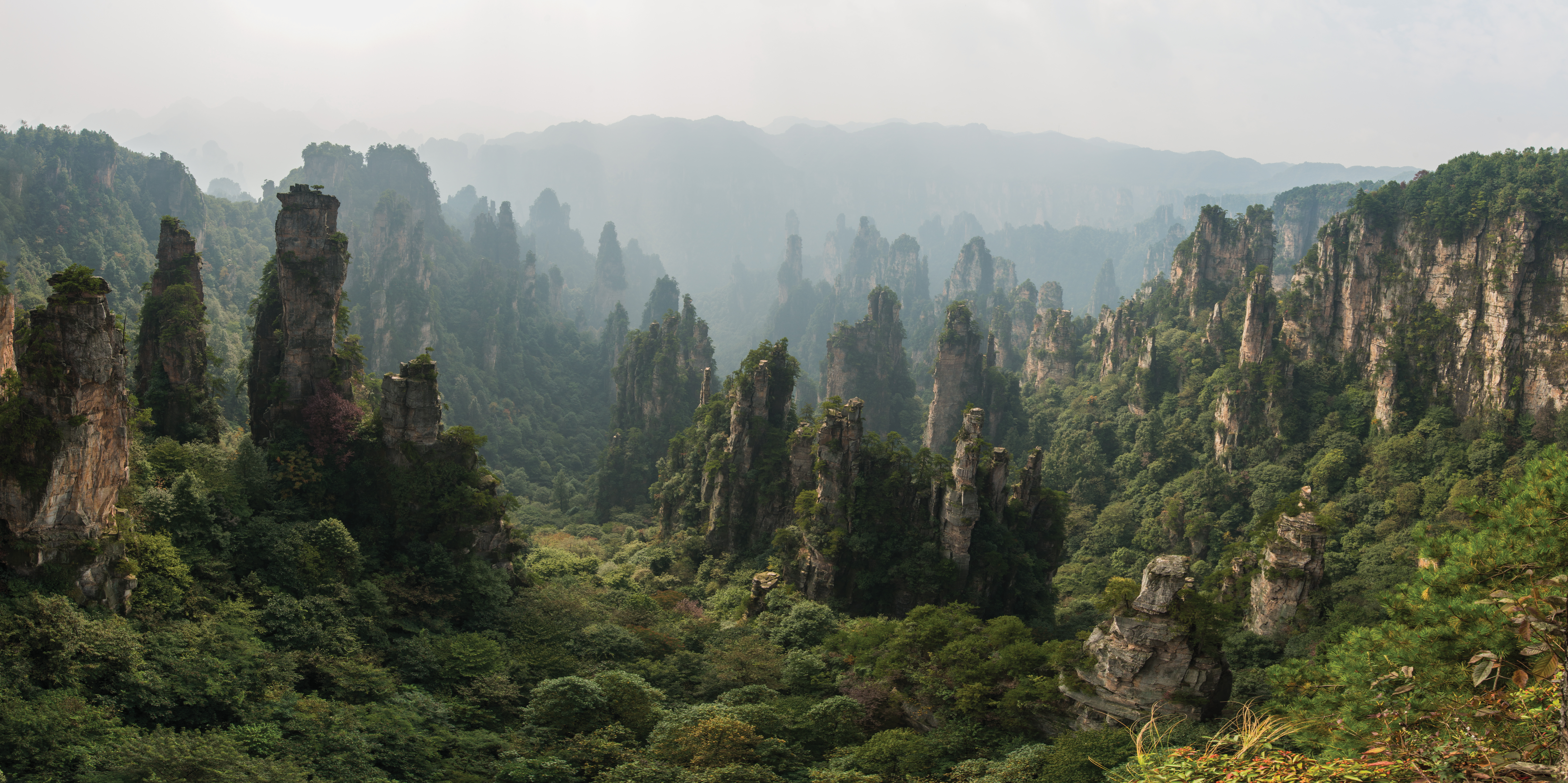
The forest scenes were shot at the Zhangjiajie National Forest Park in northern Hunan Province

The first filming lasted about 85 days, including holidays (over 3 months). Principal photography and production ended in December 2013 and by summer of 2014 the team was working on the special effects which was about 70% done. However, in August of the same year lead actor Kai Ko was arrested in Beijing for drug charges. Hui's initial reaction was that the incident and subsequent arrest of Ko would give him more time to work on the special effects even better. Despite no officials directly ordering the film to be reshot, in fall of the same year, producers Doris Tse and Kong informed Hui of the decision to reshoot 70% of the film with a new actor in place since Chinese authorities were unwilling to show the film with a drug-using headliner anytime soon. Kong admitted that it was a normal business decision and that there wasn't much heroism involved. However, such a massive undertaking would have to cost millions of dollars; they would have to refilm 70% and redo 25% of the special-effects work, call back the cast and crew, find a new leading man and rebuild sets. Hui admitted that he cried after hearing this due to the turmoil he endured.

The second filming took almost five weeks (32 days), finishing in late March 2015. Jing Boran, who had starred in one of Kong's other recent films, was so eager to help Kong and Hui that he volunteered to take over Kai Ko's role without collecting a salary. More than 90% of the original crew returned for the reshoots, with many also working for free or at a reduced rate. Every day, as he completed his shots, Hui would edit and send the footage to Base FX so that effects work could start immediately. In addition to redoing all the scenes that had previously contained Ko, Hui and Kong added several new sequences and new roles and cameos for some additional well-known actors, such as Yao Chen to boost the movie's star quotient,

Hui initially felt wary and skeptical if the film would find success at the box office. But following the success of Painted Skin: The Resurrection in 2012, it boosted enough confidence that the team moved ahead with production the following year.

=== Post production ===
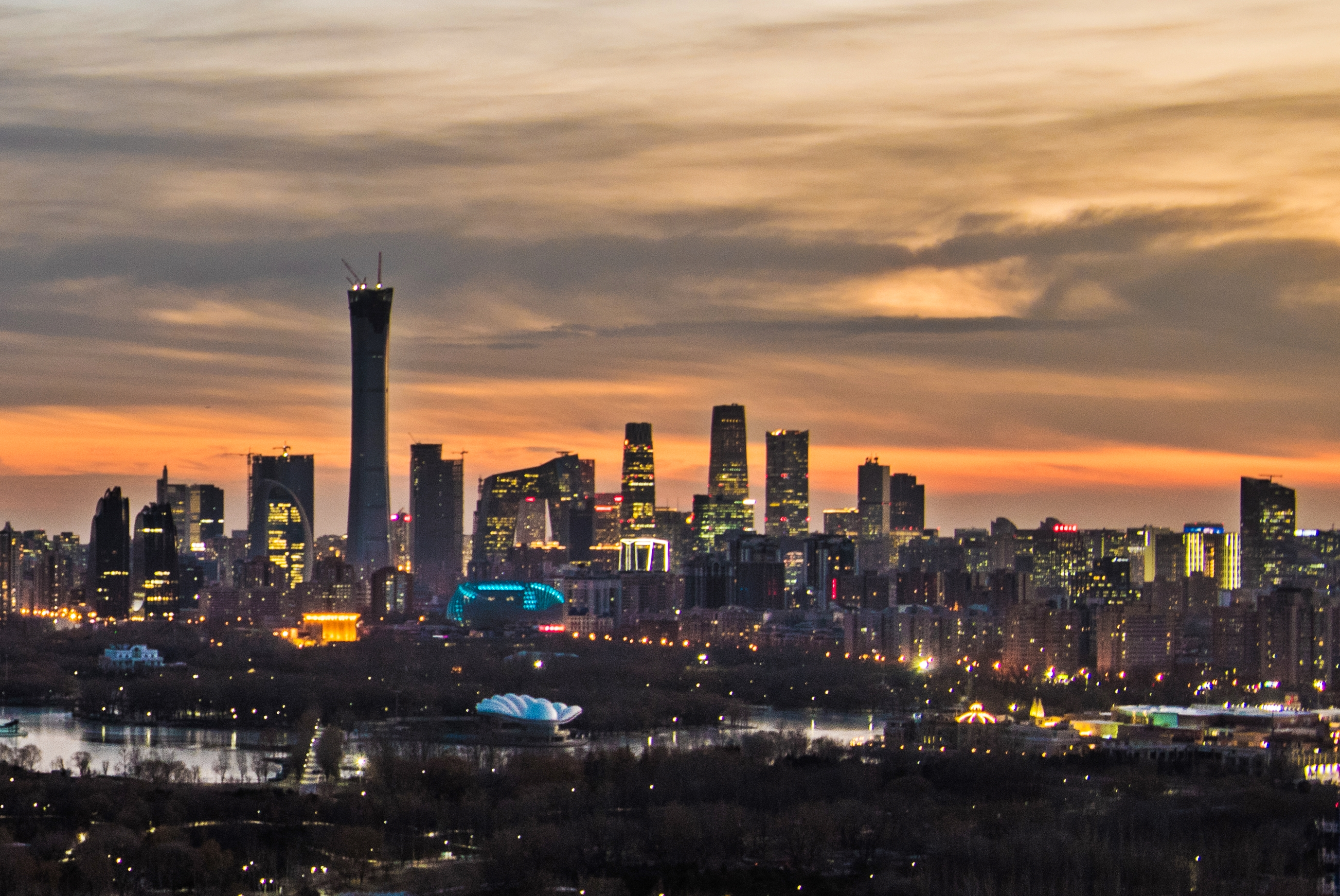
Post production for Monster Hunt was done almost entirely in Beijing (pictured) with a few works also done in Taiwan.

The film's visual effects was supervised by Jason H. Snell among others, who previously worked on the visual effects for Pirates of the Caribbean film series, Harry Potter and the Half-Blood Prince, Elysium and Tomorrowland and others. Base FX in Beijing was responsible for the film's visual effects. According to Christopher Bremble, chief executive of Base FX, his initial reaction about refilming was fear and concern for Kong, who had made a big investment in the project. In total, the film took 7 years to complete.

=== Music ===
Leon Ko composed the incidental music for Monster Hunt.

== Release ==
In China, Monster Hunt was originally planned to open in February 2015, during the Chinese New Year holiday. However, following the arrest of Kai Ko, much of the film needed reshoots and a subsequent replacement. This led to film's delay release to 16 July 2015. The film was also released in countries like Malaysia and Singapore. As for a United States and Europe release, Hui and Kong were initially skeptical and dubious if the film could find a general audience there since the film was made to aim at Chinese speaking audience. Hui said If they do release it there, they might need to think about making some adjustments.

In September 2015, FilmRise acquired the rights to distribute the film in North America and will release the film in early 2016. In the same month, Hui told Forbes about the possibility to dub the film in English since younger audiences would find it difficult to read the subtitles. In December 2015, an English version of the trailer premiered. The film was released in the United States and Canada on January 22, 2016 in 2D and 3D in two versions; the original Mandarin version with English subtitles and an English dubbed version. The film will remain in theaters for a traditional 90 days before becoming available on VOD.

It ended its theatrical run in China on September 17, 2015, playing in theaters for 59 days.

The film opened in South Korea on November 12, 2015 and was released in 2D format only in contrary to its 3D release in China.

=== Marketing ===
Due to time constraints, the producers of the film were unable to put licensing deals in place which resulted in a loss of potential ancillary revenue. Hui estimates they lost over a few million dollars for failing to procure merchandising right sales. However, due to the sheer popularity of the film, certain pirate companies produced illegal goods inspired by the film such as the character of Wuba which aided the film in its box office success and in a way delivered free marketing for the film. Hui's only concern was the quality of the goods which were poorly designed.

== Reception ==
=== Box office ===
Monster Hunt grossed US$382 million China and including revenues from other countries it grossed a total of US$387 million worldwide. According to Hui, the film needed to make US$125–141 million to break-even due to the film's increased budget and marketing for the reshoot. After just two weeks of release Monster Hunt became the highest-grossing Chinese local movie of all time and in September overtook Furious 7 as the highest ever. On Saturday, September 12—on its 58th day after release—it surpassed Furious 7 to become the highest-grossing film in China with 2.428 bn yuan (US$380.99 million) over Furious 7's 2.426B yuan (US$380.67 million). However, that's reflective of market fluctuations over the past few months: when Furious 7 ended its China run in mid-May, the conversion from the yuan came to US$391.2 million. Monster Hunt is the first Chinese film to top the all-time Chinese box office charts in the 21 years since the market re-opened to foreign films. It became the highest-grossing film in China for five months until surpassed by The Mermaid in February 2016, and the highest-grossing IMAX film in China with $27 million until surpassed by Mojin: The Lost Legend in 2016.

Before the film's official release on July 16, 2015 the film made US$930,000 in previews, and on its opening day, Thursday, July 16, 2015, it grossed US$27.5 million, setting a new opening-day and single-day record for a Chinese local film, breaking The Monkey King's record and a single day IMAX record of $2.7 million on Saturday. The following morning, Hui received a congratulatory phone call from Jeffrey Katzenberg, his former boss at DreamWorks Animation. Through its 4-day opening weekend, it earned a total of US$109 million (Rentrak reported a Friday-to-Sunday gross of $72 million and $99 million Thursday-to-Sunday) debuting atop the Chinese box office as well as the international box office. IMAX contributed $8.7 million of the opening gross from 216 screens, a new record for a Chinese produced film. Earning US$46 in its second weekend — US$113 million in its full week from 19 million tickets sold — it topped both the Chinese as well as the international box office for two consecutive weekends making it a rare occurrence for a non-Hollywood film to top the international box office for more than one weekend. After four consecutive weekends at No. 1 at the Chinese box office, it was finally replaced by Go Away Mr. Tumor in its fifth weekend, another film also starring Bai Baihe.

It became the fastest Chinese movie to reach the RMB1.05 billion ($169 million) milestone, doing so in 8 days. The success of the film has been attributed to several factors, such as positive reaction and word of mouth from audiences, and also due to China's State Administration of Press, Publication, Radio, Film and Television (SAPPRFT) implementation of the "domestic film protection period" or the "mid-summer domestic film protection period" or simply "blackout"; the unofficial session which lasts six to eight week when fewer foreign films are released in Chinese theaters in order to open up more screen time for Chinese movies.

In South Korea, the film had a "modest" opening at No. 9 with $130,000. In the United States and Canada, it opened with $21,074 from 45 theaters on an average of $468 per theater. It went on to earn a paltry $32,766 after playing in theaters for only a week.

The film has been viewed by over 65 million people in China.

==== Controversy ====
In September 2015, following suspicions raised on the internet by netizens, an article by the Chinese state broadcaster China Central Television (CCTV) speculated that it achieved the feat of becoming the highest-grossing film in China by artificially boosting its ticket sales. This was followed by an article by the state media accusing the film of inflating its ticket sales. According to the Financial Times, beginning in late August, netizens reported cases of theater scheduling screenings of the film in the middle of the night and multiple showings of the film on the same theater screen scheduled less than 30 minutes apart. Furthermore, in September, CCTV also reported that the company might have exploited the "public welfare screening" – a common practice for Chinese theaters and production companies to offer free tickets to young children, seniors, key workers, police, teachers and the disabled and in the same month it was found that public welfare screenings of the film at three different theaters were completely empty. According to the SARFT, Monster Hunt grossed RMB2.43 billion during its summer theatrical run. Edko, the film's distributor stated that those figures incorporated RMB40.42 million worth of tickets handed out during the final 15 days of release for the film – an average of RMB2.7 million a day which according to calculations by National Business Daily accounts for virtually all of the film's box office earnings in that period. The company also issued a statement on Chinese social media site Weibo, saying it had "instituted serious criticism" to those responsible for the suspect screenings.

=== Critical reception ===
On review aggregator website Rotten Tomatoes, it has a 64% approval rating, based on 22 reviews, with a rating average of 5.7 out of 10. It has a score of 53% on Metacritic based on 14 reviews.

Elizabeth Kerr of The Hollywood Reporter called it "A would-be epic adventure-fantasy that's epically muddled." Edmund Lee of South China Morning Post gave it three out of five stars, and says it is "a distinctly Chinese live-action debut", but it "tackles a litany of clichéd Chinese attributes and is more engaging as cultural commentary than entertainment." Derek Elley of Film Business Asia gave the film a 7 out of 10, calling it a "well-packaged family entertainment [that] disguises its unoriginality with top CG animation." Simon Abrams, writing for Roger Ebert.com, awarded it 2.5 out of 4 stars, saying "The story never goes anywhere unexpected, but really, you should see "Monster Hunt" with your kids. It is silly and over-the-top and a great time-killer." The A.V. Club gave a mixed review, saying "Monster Hunt combines a lot of qualities from the other items on the all-timer’s list: epic action, elaborate special effects, broad comedy, and a style that could best be described as "exhausting.""

=== Awards and nominations ===
Year	Award	Category	Recipient	Result
2015	CineAsia Awards	Director of the Year	Raman Hui	Won
2015	18th Huading Awards	Best Chinese Director	Raman Hui	Won
2015	12th Guangzhou Student Film Festival	Most Popular Actress	Bai Baihe	Won
2016	33rd Hundred Flowers Award	Best Picture	Monster Hunt	Nominated
2016	33rd Hundred Flowers Award	Best Director	Raman Hui	Nominated
2016	33rd Hundred Flowers Award	Best Actor	Jing Boran	Nominated
2016	33rd Hundred Flowers Award	Best Actress	Bai Baihe	Nominated
2016	33rd Hundred Flowers Award	Best Screenplay	Alan Yuen	Nominated
2016	13th Changchun Film Festival	Best Actress	Bai Baihe	Won
2017	31st Golden Rooster Awards	Best Actress	Bai Baihe	Nominated
2017	31st Golden Rooster Awards	Best Art Direction	Li Jianwei	Nominated

== Sequels ==
Monster Hunt 2 is a sequel to 2015's Monster Hunt directed by Raman Hui, starring Tony Leung, Bai Baihe, Jing Boran, Li Yuchun and Tony Yang. It was released in China on February 16, 2018. A third film was also announced. In February 2017, Hui and Kong discussed about a fourth film and a potential spin-off. The idea is the turn these films into a franchise, a first time in China and expanding the franchise with sub-licensing agreements, merchandising deals and theme park attractions.
