= BoBo (band) =

Chinese boy band

BOBO
- Born: People's Republic of China
- Occupations: Singers, actors
- Years active: 2007 - present
- Musical career
- Also known as: BOBO组合
- Origin: People's Republic of China
- Genre: Mandopop
- Label: H.Y. Brothers
- Members: Jing Boran, Fu Xinbo

BOBO is a Chinese boy band composed of two members, Jing Boran (Chinese: 井柏然) and Fu Xinbo (Chinese: 付辛博).

The two became famous after competing in the 2007 My Hero (simplified Chinese: 07加油！好男儿; traditional Chinese: 07加油！好男兒) competition, with Jing Boran winning first and Fu Xinbo third. In 2008, the two released their own EP, Glory (simplified Chinese: 光荣; traditional Chinese: 光榮), and then the album, The Big World (Chinese: 世界之大). Since their debut, they have won multiple new artists awards.

In 2008, they performed during the pre-ceremony performance of the 2008 Summer Paralympics opening ceremony. The two also began their acting career in 2008, with Fu Xinbo playing in I am Veeker (simplified Chinese: 微客帝国; traditional Chinese: 微客帝國) and Jing Boran in A Tribute to Stephen Chow (simplified Chinese: 向周星驰致敬先; traditional Chinese: 向周星馳致敬先).

== Origin of the name ==
Both members of the group have a "bo" sound in their names. When combined, Jing Boran's Bo (Chinese: 柏) and Fu Xinbo's Bo (Chinese: 博), form the name BOBO.

== Fanclubs ==
Jing Boran's fanclub is known as BBF, standing for BaBy Face because during the My Hero competition, one judge called Jing Boran Baby Face. Fu Xinbo's fanclub is known as BBT, standing for Bong Bang Tang, another term for lollipop. He was also nicknamed “Little Meat Bun" for his puffy cheeks. Fans of BoBo as a whole are called BBS, or BOBO'S fans.

== Discography ==
Album	Track listing
光荣 (Pinyin: Guāngróng; English: Glory;): Released: October 15, 2007; Format: CD; Label: H.Y. Brothers	Track listing: 1. 光荣 (Pinyin: Guāngróng; English: Glory;); 2. 唱歌给你听 (Pinyin: Chàng Gē Gĕi Nǐ Tīng; English: Singing a Song for You to Hear;); 3. 哈利BOBO (Pinyin: Hālì BOBO; English: Harry BOBO;)
世界之大 (Pinyin: Shìjiè zhī Dà; English: The Big World;): Released: April 27, 2008; Format: CD; Label: H.Y. Brothers	Track listing: 1. 开场曲 (Pinyin: Kāichǎng Qū; English: Opening Song;); 2. 大明星 (Pinyin: Dà Míngxīng; English: The Big Star;); 3. 世界之大 (Pinyin: Shìjiè zhī Dà; English: The Big World;); 4. 付辛博 吉他弹奏 (Pinyin: Fù Xīnbó Jítā Tán Zòu; English: Fu Xinbo Playing the Guitar;); 5. 双城 (Pinyin: Shuāng Chéng;); 6. 假如 (Pinyin: Jiǎrú; English: If;); 7. Talking 1; 8. 时刻准备着 (Pinyin: Shíkè Zhǔnbèizhe; English: Getting Ready on Time;); 9. 电台转台 (Pinyin: Diàntái Zhuàntái; English: Turntable Radio;); 10. 我们唱的歌 (Pinyin: Wǒmen Chàng de Gē; English: The Song We Sing;); 11. 一米阳光 (Pinyin: Yī Mǐ Yángguāng; English: One Meter of Sunshine;); 12. Talking 2; 13. 光荣QREMIX (Pinyin: Guāngróng QREMIX; English: Glory QREMIX;); 14. 恋爱新手 (Pinyin: Liàn Ài Xīnshǒu; English: Love Novice;); 15. 井柏然 钢琴弹奏 (Pinyin: Jǐng Bǎi Rán Gāngqín Tán Zòu; English: Jing Boran Playing the Piano;); 16. 怎么爱 (Pinyin: Zěnme Ài; English: How to Love;); 17. Talking 3; 18. Talking 4; 19. 光荣COOLREMIX (Pinyin: Guāngróng COOLREMIX; English: Glory COOLREMIX;)
Let's BOBO: Released: June 3, 2010; Format: CD; Label: H.Y. Brothers	Track listing: 1. Let's BOBO; 2. 全城热恋 (Pinyin: Quán Chéng Rèliàn; English: City of Love;); 3. 我只在乎你 (Pinyin: Wǒ Zhǐ Zàihū Nǐ; English: I Only Care About You;); 4. 喜欢你 (Pinyin: Xǐhuan Nǐ; English: Liking You;); 5. 希望 (Pinyin: Xīwàng; English: To Wish For;); 6. 毕业歌 (Pinyin: Bìyè Gē; English: Graduation Song;); 7. 爱就爱 (Pinyin: Ài Jiù Ài; English: Just Love;); 8. 哈皮BOBO (Pinyin: Hāpí BOBO; English: Happy BOBO;); 9. 停不了的快乐 (Pinyin: Tíng Bùliǎo de Kuàilè; English: Endless Joy;)

== Awards ==
2007 My Hero National Competition

- First Place - Jing Boran
- Most Popular - Jing Boran
- Third Place - Fu Xinbo
- Most Photogenic - Fu Xinbo

2007 BQ

- Most Popular New Artist First Place - Fu Xinbo
- Most Popular New Artist Second Place - Jing Boran
- Best Idol of the Year

2007 FM 917 Vacation Awards Ceremony

- Most Popular Group
- Golden Melody - Glory (EP)

2007 QQ Starlight Ceremony

- Group With the Most Potential

2007 Sina Internet Awards

- Most Popular Group

2007 Music Radio Top Chinese Charts

- Most Popular Group in Mainland
- Golden Melody - Glory (EP)

2008 University Students Music Festival

- Most Popular New Artists
