= List of My Fair Princess characters =

This article lists characters in the popular Chinese-language television series My Fair Princess (1998–1999) and My Fair Princess III (2003).

== Recurring characters ==
Character	My Fair Princess		My Fair Princess III	New My Fair Princess
Character	1998	1999	2003	2011
Xiaoyanzi (小燕子)	Zhao Wei	Zhao Wei	Huang Yi	Li Sheng
Xia Ziwei (夏紫薇)	Ruby Lin	Ruby Lin	Ma Yili	Hai Lu
Yongqi (永琪)	Alec Su	Alec Su	Leo Ku	Zhang Rui
Fu Erkang (福爾康)	Zhou Jie	Zhou Jie	Zhou Jie	Li Jiahang
Jinsuo (金瑣)	Fan Bingbing	Fan Bingbing		Sun Yaoqi
Qianlong Emperor (乾隆皇帝)	Zhang Tielin	Zhang Tielin	Ti Lung	Chiu Hsin-chih
Empress Ulanara	Dai Chunrong	Dai Chunrong	Jiang Lili	Sheren Tang
Consort Ling (令妃)	Zhao Lijuan	Zhao Lijuan	Chen Li	Liu Xiaoye
Wet-Nurse Rong (容嬷嬷)	Li Mingqi	Li Mingqi	Qiao Chen	Fang Qingzhuo
Liu Qing (柳青)	Lu Shiyu	Lu Shiyu		Wang Jinduo
Liu Hong (柳紅)	Chen Ying	Chen Ying		Zhou Fang
Fu Lun (福倫)	Wen Haibo	Wen Haibo	Wen Haibo	Lei Zhenyu
Fu Lun's wife	Liu Fang	Liu Fang	Liu Fang	Chen Huijuan
Xiaodengzi (小鄧子)	Xue Yan	Xue Yan	Zhai Yujia	Qu Aohui
Xiaozhuozi (小卓子)	Li Nan	Liu Wei	Zhang Tong	Zhang Zhuowen
Mingyue (明月)	Yu Mengjie	Yu Mengjie	Gong Yan	Yu Yingying
Caixia (彩霞)	Liu Fangyu	Li Bingqiao	Du Minhe	Ma Xiangyi
Xia Yuhe (夏雨荷)	Ruby Lin			Ruby Lin
Fu Ertai (福爾泰)	Julian Chen			Lu Hong
Saiya (賽婭)	Zhang Heng			Chai Biyun
Ji Xiaolan (紀曉嵐)	Liu Dan			Gang Yi
Fu Heng (傅恆)	Zhang Wei		Wang Weiguang	Xing Hanqing
E Min (鄂敏)	You Long			Yang Fengyu
Liang Tinggui (梁廷桂)	Liu Wei			Zang Jinsheng
Sai Wei (賽威)	Miao Haojun			Yang Quanjing
Sai Guang (賽廣)	Zhu Jinglong			Ye Dao
Lamei (臘梅)	Dong Wei			Zhou Jingjing
Dongxue (冬雪)	Ai Yang			Zhang Xinyue
Cailian (採蓮)	Yang Dong			Xie Zhongling
Ruolan (若蘭)	Zheng Jiaxin			Jenny Zhang
Empress Dowager Niohuru		Zhao Minfen	Zhao Minfen	Leanne Liu
Qing'er (晴兒)		Wang Yan	Wang Yan	Zanilia Zhao
Xiao Jian (簫劍)		Zhu Hongjia	Huang Xiaoming	Gao Ziqi
Hanxiang (含香)		Liu Dan		Madina Memet
Mengdan/Mai'erdan/Merdan		Mou Fengbin		Zhang Danfeng
Ali Hezhuo (阿里和卓)		Yin Wei		Nige Mutu
Wet-Nurse Gui (桂嬷嬷)		Zhai Yuerong	Zhou Guiyun	Li Xiaoyan
Zhen'er (真兒)			Li Yaxi	Hu Qiunan
Cui'er (翠兒)			Fan Rui	Weng Wenqian

== Original characters ==
Qianlong Emperor

Based on a true-life emperor of the Qing dynasty, Qianlong Emperor in this series is portrayed as a benevolent and caring but often short father. Part of the Aisin-Gioro ruling family, Qianlong is of Manchu descent. Like the real-life Qianlong, the emperor in My Fair Princess is a lover of arts and literature. Besides his empress, whom he often neglects, he has many concubines, his favorite of which is Consort Ling.

Qianlong first meets Xiaoyanzi (literally "Little Swallow") on his hunting grounds, into which she broke whilst serving as Ziwei's messenger. Ziwei is the Emperor's real daughter from a tryst the Emperor had long ago. Her attempts to contact her father have all failed and eventually meets Xiaoyanzi, a happy-go-lucky street wanderer, who agrees to sneak onto Imperial hunting grounds to deliver her message during the Emperor's hunting outing. After accidentally being shot by an arrow, Qianlong finds the message she is carrying and mistakes her for his daughter and quickly becomes enamored with her happy-go-lucky charm and her free-spirited ways, unfettered by the protocol and conventions of the nobility. Ironically, though, he later grew to love Ziwei for completely different reasons-her elegance and eloquence, intelligence and sophistication. At one point, Ziwei shields him from an assassination attempt. Xiaoyanzi is taken into the royal household and is dubbed "Huan Zhu Ge Ge", or "Princess Returned Pearl", claiming that she is like a pearl that is lost and then returned; though she is still referred to as Xiaoyanzi by those closest to her. Xiaoyanzi eventually convinces the court to allow her to bring Ziwei into her household, still determined to help her reconnect with her father. Qianlong's feelings for Ziwei prove problematic when he asks her to be his concubine. Although he is upset when he learns that Ziwei is his true daughter, he later forgives them for their deception and serves as a very loving father to both his actual daughter and his newly adopted one as well.

Xiaoyanzi
- Zhao Wei as Xiaoyanzi (Princess Huanzhu)

In-universe information
- Full name: Fang Ci (birth name)
- Alias: Huanzhu Gege; Huanzhu Junzhu
- Nickname: "Little Swallow" "Sparrow" "Princess Returning Pearl"
- Gender: Female
- Family: House of Aisin Gioro
- Spouse: Yongqi
- Children: 4
- Father: Fang Zhihang (biological), Qianlong Emperor (foster and later father-in-law)
- Brother: Xiao Jian
- Sworn sister: Xia Ziwei (later sister-in-law)
- Born: 1742; Hangzhou, Qing dynasty

Xiaoyanzi

Xiaoyanzi is first introduced as an 18-year-old who roams the city with her friends, Liu Qing and Liu Hong. Orphaned at a young age, Xiaoyanzi is an independent thinker and knows little about rules and regulations. She earns money using jianghu ways and is not unwilling to do anything to survive. Although mischievous, Xiaoyanzi helps others in need regardless of the circumstances.

Xiaoyanzi's entire existence is altered when she meets Xia Ziwei. The night before their first meeting, Xiaoyanzi had agreed to switch places with a bride who was to marry into the Liang household. The bride was extremely unwilling and planned on committing suicide, but Xiaoyanzi arranged for her to escape. Ziwei happened to be at the wedding as well, for different reasons. When Ziwei helps Xiaoyanzi hide the guards, the two begin to admire each other. They meet again at one of Xiaoyanzi's performances. Through several other meetings, Ziwei agrees to live with Xiaoyanzi. The two become sworn sisters.

As sworn sisters, Ziwei reveals her most important secrets to Xiaoyanzi, including her background (that she is the emperor's illegitimate child). Xiaoyanzi is shocked to find out that she is the sister to a princess or ge ge. However, she vows to help Ziwei find her father. The two decide to intrude on one of Qianlong's hunting trips on a local mountain. However, the feeble Ziwei cannot climb the mountain, so she sends Xiaoyanzi as her messenger. There, Yongqi, the fifth prince, accidentally shoots her with an arrow. Through a series of misunderstandings, Qianlong mistakenly names Xiaoyanzi his daughter, rather than Ziwei. A confused Xiaoyanzi, unaware of the punishments for lying to an emperor, is proclaimed Huan Zhu Ge Ge. Qianlong dotes on Xiaoyanzi greatly, making it more difficult for Xiaoyanzi to admit the truth.

Xiaoyanzi lives an equally adventurous life inside the palace, where she meets her lover, Yongqi, as well as friends Ertai and Erkang. She also becomes rivals with the Empress, Huang Hou, who is jealous when Xiaoyanzi receives so much attention from Qianlong. After discovering the enormity of her mistakes, she vows to return the title of princess to Ziwei but is still too afraid, to tell the truth. Tension grows as Xiaoyanzi struggles to adapt to life in the Forbidden City, violating the rules several times. Additionally, her guilt about stealing Ziwei's title becomes unbearable, to the point where she unsuccessfully attempts to escape from the Forbidden City. Xiaoyanzi later learns that Ziwei is living in the Fu household. She temporarily disguises herself as an eunuch and leaves the Forbidden City to visit Ziwei. Although Ziwei forgives her for taking her title, Xiaoyanzi still intends to return Qianlong to Ziwei.

A fictional romance blossoms between Yongqi, the fifth prince, and Xiaoyanzi in Season 1. Yongqi quickly develops feelings for Xiaoyanzi shortly after meeting her, but Xiaoyanzi's tomboy attitude, along with her false title, causes her to only think of him as a brother. However, after Yongqi learns Xiaoyanzi is not his biological sister, he shares his feelings with her. Xiaoyanzi becomes confused, unsure of how she feels about Yongqi. At first, she tries to have him marry a girl that was planning to get married with a random ball throw catch arrangement, but he res, after a girl named Cailian falls for Yongqi, Xiaoyanzi becomes extremely jealous. She refuses to eat or speak in Yongqi's presence. Irritated, Yongqi calls Xiaoyanzi a girl with no virtue. Xiaoyanzi's anger causes her to act recklessly. When she falls off a horse, Yongqi soon feels sorry about the incident and kisses her. Xiaoyanzi forgives Yongqi after she realizes she is truly in love with him. The challenge between them is their supposed brother-sister relationship. This causes the group to reveal that Xiaoyanzi is not Qianlong's daughter. Although Qianlong is initially angry, he soon forgives them.

In Part II of the series, they are arranged to be married with a lot of love. Throughout the series, they go through many fights, but eventually, they always reconcile with each other. Many times, they have also feuded about Yongqi being unable to accept her commoner ways because he's a prince and of biological royalty. Yongqi and Xiaoyanzi are very stubborn towards each other when they argue because both refuse to be wrong, but Yongqi usually winds up being the first to cave. Many times, he's there to catch her in both a literal sense and expression. When they run away from the Forbidden City, Yongqi gets jealous of Xiaoyanzi's close relationship with Xiao Jian, before it was revealed that he was her brother. At the end of Part II, they get married.

In history, Yongqi never had a serious romance. Their love story is purely fictional.

Xiaoyanzi's past is never known for certain. In Season 2, she meets Xiao Jian, a man who claims to be her older brother. However, this is merely based on the account of a nun who raised Xiaoyanzi during her childhood. If Xiaoyanzi is truly Xiao Jian's younger sister, then her birth name was Fang Ci. When Xiaoyanzi was but a baby, her father was beheaded at the order of Qianlong for writing a poem that offended the Qing Dynasty. Her mother died shortly after, committing suicide. Xiaoyanzi's other family members were beheaded as well, but Xiao Jian and Xiaoyanzi managed to escape. Xiaoyanzi was sent to north, in Beijing, and Xiao Jian was sent to the south, in Dali. This is ironic as Xiaoyanzi later became Qianlong's adopted daughter. Tension grows because of this situation.

In the third installment of the series, it is confirmed that Xiaoyanzi is indeed Xiao Jian's sister. After the turmoils of the third installment, Xiaoyanzi, and Xiao Jian, along with Yongqi, Ziwei, Erkang, and Qing'er go to Dali, where they meet Xiao Jian's foster parents. Xiao Jian's foster parents reveal that Fang Ci has a birthmark on her body, but at first, they are reluctant to say out loud where her birthday is. Eventually, much to Xiaoyanzi's embarrassment and everyone else's amusement, they tell Xiaoyanzi that if she is the real Fang Ci, she would have a mole on her buttock. In the scene after this, Yongqi pulls Xiao Jian aside to confirm this fact, albeit with much amusement at Xiaoyanzi's expense.

Xia Ziwei
- Ruby Lin as Ziwei (Princess Mingzhu)

In-universe information
- Alias: Aisin-Gioro Ziwei; Mingzhu Gege
- Nickname: "Myrtle" "Rose" "Princess Bright Pearl"
- Gender: Female
- Family: House of Aisin Gioro (father)
- Spouse: Fu Erkang
- Children: Fu Dong'er
- Father: Qianlong Emperor
- Mother: Xia Yuhe
- Half-brother: Yongqi
- Sworn sister: Xiaoyanzi (later sister-in-law)
- Born: 2 August 1742; Jinan, Shandong, Qing dynasty

Xia Ziwei

Xia Ziwei was named after the crape myrtle, because that flower bloomed particularly beautifully when she was born.

Ziwei's single but talented mother, Xia Yuhe, had a romance several years ago with the Qianlong Emperor. The two never marry, and business matters soon require Qianlong to leave Jinan. After Qianlong departs Jinan, the city where Xia Yuhe resided, Yuhe gives birth to Ziwei out of wedlock. Of half Han Chinese descent and half Manchu descent, Ziwei is unaware of her special background until her mother is on her deathbed. Then, she reveals to Ziwei that she is of royal blood, and tells her to find her father. She gives Ziwei two items, a fan, and a painting, both given to Yuhe as a present from Qianlong. Like her mother, Ziwei is multitalented. She can play the zither, sing, paint, write calligraphy, participate in literary discussions, and play chess, an unusual amount of talent for a female. More quiet and gentle than Xiaoyanzi, Ziwei is a fragile beauty.

Ziwei takes on this arduous task with her faithful servant, Jinsuo. However, after arriving in Beijing, she discovers how impossible it is for her to reach her father. She is not allowed to enter the Forbidden City, and cannot find an official who is willing to help her. She attempts to seek the assistance of royal officer Liang Da Ren, but her efforts do not succeed. Finally, she attends the Liang household's wedding, in hopes of getting in touch with Liang Da Ren. There, she meets Xiaoyanzi, her future sworn sister. She reveals her secrets to Xiaoyanzi and sends Xiaoyanzi as her messenger to Qianlong.

After sending Xiaoyanzi as her messenger, Ziwei hears no word of Xiaoyanzi for weeks. She is extremely worried. When she finds Xiaoyanzi, now dubbed Huan Zhu Ge Ge, parading around the streets, she is heartbroken to find that Xiaoyanzi stole her title and father. She runs after Xiaoyanzi. Guards mistake her for an imposter, and nearly beat her to death. However, she is saved by Fu Erkang, the son of royal officer Fu Lun. Ziwei is nursed in the Fu household. Immediately, Erkang is captivated by her beauty, intelligence, and warm personality. His feelings for her cause other problems to arise. Ziwei later decides to give up her title to protect Xiaoyanzi, but she and Erkang cannot marry if she only has the status of a commoner. Thus, she enters the Forbidden City as a court maid so she can meet her father, Qianlong. Then she one day tells the truth and becomes the princess.

Fu Erkang met Ziwei during a march, when Xiaoyanzi was titled "Huan Zhu Ge Ge" or "Returned Pearl Princess". Ziwei was trying to get to Xiaoyanzi and confront her. Ziwei wound up getting beaten by the guards but was saved by Erkang who commanded them to stop. He later took her into his family household and falls in love with her intelligence, beauty, manners, and talents, she returned his feelings.

Their relationship starts off being complicated because of Erkang's position as a royal imperial guard whilst Ziwei is still a commoner. She tells him about her background and what happened with her and Xiaoyanzi. Both of their titles cause complications, so Erkang gets her into the Forbidden City as a court maid with Xiaoyanzi to try to improve her status. Yet, their relationship is still complicated because of the Qianlong Emperor's interest in Ziwei, since he isn't aware of her relationship with him. Ziwei is very traditional with her display of affection towards her Erkang, so she rarely ever shows any, unless truly necessary. Throughout the series, they have fights and disagreements that have a lot of emotional issues. Erkang cares for Ziwei very much from when she's physically hurt to when she's emotional. Since she can't fight, he gets hurt protecting her at times. Whenever one or the other gets hurt, they each feel very much pain. They marry at the end of Part II.

On her paternal side, Ziwei descends from the Manchu Aisin Gioro clan, the reigning imperial family of China at the time. Through her father, Ziwei is a descendant of Genghis Khan, Eidu, Nurhaci, and other prominent figures in Manchu and Mongolian history.

The Xia family, the family of Ziwei's mother, originated in the city of Jinan in Shandong Province. The story mentions very little about the family, however, we do know that they were affluent members of the Confucian gentry class. During one of Qianlong's secret visits to Shandong, the Xia family saved him from the rain and gave him a place to stay. During his stay in Shandong, he met their daughter, Yuhe.

Although no members of this family appeared in the story, except Ziwei and her mother, and several brief mentions of her maternal grandparents, an uncle, and aunt of Ziwei seemed to be in contact with the Empress, although it is unknown whether or not either of them is surnamed, Xia.

Yongqi

Also known as "5th Prince" (五阿哥; Wu Ah Ge), Yongqi is Qianlong's fifth son. His mother, Consort Yu, died of illness during his childhood, thus he was raised primarily by Consort Ling. Yongqi is Qianlong's favorite son, being intelligent, considerate, strong, and skilled at martial arts- and the most-likely heir to the throne. His all-around talents also inspire the jealousy of the empress, who hopes her son, the twelfth prince, will succeed Qianlong instead. Yongqi is close friends with the sons of Fu Lun: Fu Erkang and Fu Ertai. He and Ertai are also classmates; both study with Ji Xiaolan.

Yongqi and Xiaoyanzi meet during the same hunting trip that brought the latter into the royal circle. He was the shooter of the fateful arrow that caused Xiaoyanzi to lose consciousness, triggering the train of events and mistaken identities. Like his father, Yongqi was besotted by her fun, warm and bold nature. Because Xiaoyanzi struggles to adjust to living in the Forbidden City, Yongqi, along with Ertai, helps her through some early problems. He also learns from Erkang and Ertai that Xiaoyanzi is not the true princess; rather, Ziwei is. Yongqi's "like" for Xiaoyanzi soon turns into love, although he did not admit this for a long time. After Xiaoyanzi attempts to matchmake Yongqi with another girl, Yongqi finally told Xiaoyanzi his feelings. A confused Xiaoyanzi later realizes she is also in love with Yongqi. Throughout the series, Yongqi goes through much adversity with Xiaoyanzi, Ziwei, and Erkang. Xiaoyanzi and Yongqi go through a relationship with many fights and reconciliations until they wed at the end of Season 2.

Fu Erkang (Zhou Jie)

Fu Erkang

The eldest son of high-ranking noble Fu Lun, the handsome Erkang is a scholar. Well-trained in kung fu, Erkang is part of the royal guard. He is not quite as absorbed in Xiaoyanzi as Yongqi and Ertai, but he does get involved in some of Xiaoyanzi's earlier struggles in the palace. After meeting Ziwei, the real princess, during a parade, Erkang falls in love with her. Their relationship progresses, but it reaches a dead end. Erkang realizes that as a son of the aristocracy, he cannot marry Ziwei, then a commoner. Thus, he brings Ziwei and her maid Jinsuo into the Forbidden City as court maids with help from Xiaoyanzi. Erkang loves Ziwei dearly. With his background, talents, and his air of authority, Erkang is a very attractive potential husband. At one point, Qianlong decides to pair him with Sai Ya, a princess from Tibet, but he was saved by his younger brother and narrowly escapes the dreaded marriage. Ziwei once made him promise that he would take Jinsuo as a second wife, but that was later broken off. In the sequel, he is reunited with Princess Qing'er, the dowager empress's favorite. He and Qing'er have an interesting history, causing angst and jealousy between him and Ziwei.

Fu Ertai

Erkang's younger brother, Fu Ertai, has a lesser critical role. However, he is one of the more important characters in Season 1. Ertai is best friends and classmates with Prince Yongqi. Like his brother, Ertai is liked by the emperor. At first, Ertai has feelings for Xiaoyanzi but later defers to Yongqi as he realizes Xiaoyanzi and Yongqi share a bond even before the two become a couple. When the other couples, Xiaoyanzi-Yongqi and Ziwei-Erkang, get into arguments, he often serves as the voice of reason. In the end, Ertai courts Sai Ya to help Erkang avoid a marriage with her. The two end up falling in love, so Ertai marries Sai Ya and goes to Tibet. He does not appear in future sequels.

Jinsuo (Fan Bingbing)

Jinsuo

Jinsuo is Ziwei's loyal maid since Jinsuo was seven. Jinsuo always looks out for Ziwei's best interests and does not show any self-concern. At first, Jinsuo does not like Xiaoyanzi very much because she affects the friendship between her and Ziwei but later is impressed by Xiaoyanzi's courage. She joins Ziwei as a court maid when they first enter the palace and later remains a court maid after Ziwei is crowned Ming Zhu Ge Ge. Jinsuo is greatly hurt in the sequel when she finds out Erkang does not want her as a wife. However, she later falls in love with Liu Qing, one of Xiaoyanzi's best friends.

The empress

The nemesis of Xiaoyanzi, Ziwei, Yongqi, and Erkang, the empress seems to be a heartless, cruel, and jealous empress. However, many of these feelings arise because Qianlong, who she cares much for, often neglects her. More outspoken and strict than Qianlong's other wives, the empress does not win his favor. She is extremely jealous of concubine Consort Ling, Qianlong's favorite concubine, Yongqi, who endangers her son's chances of inheriting the throne, as well as Xiaoyanzi, who, despite her lack of discipline, always wins Qianlong's support and encouragement. Her feelings become intensified when Ziwei arrives, as Ziwei's talent, beauty, and kindness win the liking of Qianlong. Thus, she shows signs of cruelty, attempting to hurt those she is jealous of. She most often takes out her anger on Ziwei, as she is unlikely to fight back. For instance, at one point, the empress pierces Ziwei with needles. At the end of Season 1, it seems as if the empress has redeemed herself. Ziwei pleads for Qianlong to forgive the empress, and Ziwei and the empress share a hug. However, the empress returns to her menacing ways in Season 2, with even worse plots to make the princesses miserable. When she is rescued from execution by Ziwei, Xiaoyanzi, Yongqi, and Erkang, she finally changes her ways and becomes a better person. She even hand-sews Ziwei and Xiaoyanzi's wedding dresses. In My Fair Princess III, she becomes a devout Buddhist, and is on very good terms with Xiaoyanzi and Ziwei. She is asked by Qianlong to join him on a vacation to the south of China. When she gets there, she hears about Xia Yingying and writes a letter to Qianlong with her blood. He becomes furious with her and refuses to read her letter, so she cuts her hair and almost tries to commit suicide. The Emperor's temper worsens and he sends her back to Beijing with Wet-Nurse Rong to live in a deserted place in the Forbidden City. He also demotes her and takes away her privileges as empress. Back in Beijing, she shaves her head and becomes a Buddhist nun. Months after Qianlong and company return, she falls ill and eventually dies.

Wet-Nurse Rong (Li Mingqi)

Wet-Nurse Rong

The Empress's loyal Wet-Nurse Rong serves as her sort of "sidekick" throughout the series. Like the empress, she greatly dislikes Xiaoyanzi and Ziwei. She is a very ruthless person, not the least bit unwilling to inflict great pain on others. At the beginning of Season 2, when the empress no longer wants to hurt Xiaoyanzi and Ziwei, Wet-Nurse Rong instigates her to continue for the well-being of her son. However, she is extremely loyal and always puts the empress before herself. This is perhaps her single positive trait. Like the empress, she redeems herself in the end and is forgiven. In My Fair Princess III, she stays loyal to the empress. She also becomes and devout Buddhist and is on good terms with Xiaoyanzi and Ziwei. She goes back to Beijing early with the empress and remains a faithful servant. Xiaoyanzi once referred to Wet-Nurse Rong as a motherly figure, which reconfirms their peace. When the empress dies, Wet-Nurse Rong commits suicide by stabbing herself, so that she can serve her mistress in the afterlife.

Consort Ling

Consort Ling is Qianlong's favourite concubine. She is the sister of lady Fu, the mother of Erkang and Ertai. Although she has children of her own, she treats Xiaoyanzi and Ziwei like her own daughters. She always makes an effort to help Xiaoyanzi and Ziwei during difficult times. Qianlong spends the most time with her but neglects her in Season 2 while she is pregnant. Instead, Qianlong spends time with his newest concubine, Hanxiang (Fragrant Concubine). Nevertheless, Consort Ling forgives him. In My Fair Princess III, she is yet again pregnant and remains Qianlong's favorite. She helps Xiaoyanzi in her times of need with Zhihua and Yongqi.

Liu Qing

One of Xiaoyanzi's two most trusted friends outside the Forbidden City, Liu Qing is a typical commoner from Beijing. He is not nearly as educated as Yongqi or Erkang but is kind, helpful, and loyal. Liu Qing sometimes has a rash temper, but his intentions are good. However, he is extremely skilled in kung fu, which helps him make a living. Although he grew up with Xiaoyanzi, the two are only friends. When Liu Qing first met Ziwei, he had feelings for her, but he knew he could not compete with Erkang. Thus, he decided to give up his feelings. Later, he owns a restaurant, Hui Bing Lou, with his sister Liu Hong. He is always willing to help Xiaoyanzi and her friends with anything they need. In the end, Liu Qing falls in love with Ziwei's maid Jinsuo. The two are married.

Liu Hong

The other of Xiaoyanzi's most trusted friends, Liu Hong is Liu Qing's sister. She is also very skilled in kung fu and often performs with her brother. Sometimes, when Liu Qing loses his temper, Liu Hong acts more reasonably. Like her brother, she is willing to go to any lengths to help Xiaoyanzi, Ziwei, Yongqi, and Erkang.

Saiya

A princess from Tibet, Saiya and her father arrive in Beijing in hopes of a marriage with the Aisin-Gioro royal family. Saiya is somewhat spoiled and gets very competitive with Xiaoyanzi. They only share many characteristics, including a lack of interest in literacy, a feisty temper, and enjoyment of physical activities like kung fu. Saiya first develops an interest in Erkang after fighting with him during a kung fu match, but after chasing Ertai, she realizes she loves him, not Erkang.

The empress dowager

The mother of Qianlong, the empress dowager is a very traditional woman. She does not always like new ideas and prefers prim, proper ladies. Many call her by her title, "Lao Fo Ye", (老佛爺, lit. Old Buddha). Thus, she does not take a liking to Ziwei because she was born out of wedlock. She dislikes Xiaoyanzi even more for her feisty, unladylike attitude. However, she dotes on Qing'er, whom she raised, and cares deeply about Qianlong's best interests. Additionally, she wants to break up the betrothal between Ziwei and Erkang, as Qing'er liked Erkang. She also wants Yongqi to marry a more proper lady than Xiaoyanzi. the empress dowager likes and trusts the empress as she does not know how wicked the empress is. the empress takes advantage of this, making sure the empress dowager sees Xiaoyanzi and Ziwei at their worst moments. the empress dowager often punishes Xiaoyanzi and Ziwei, as she has only seen them in trouble. However, when the empress's evil ways are discovered and the two princesses plead for forgiveness on the empress's behalf, the empress dowager realizes how special and kind-hearted they are. In the end, she treats them as her granddaughters.

Hanxiang

A new character in Season 2, Hanxiang is a princess from Xinjiang. Her father, Ali He Zhuo, the leader of the Uyghur tribe, came to Beijing in hopes of making peace with China. Hanxiang was unique because her body carried a beautiful scent that attracts butterflies. Hanxiang was offered as a gift to Qianlong. As Qianlong was quite taken with Hanxiang's beauty and fragrance, he gladly accepted Hanxiang as his concubine. Although Hanxiang was given the title "Fragrant Concubine" and constantly doted on by the emperor, Hanxiang's heart was with a childhood lover named Mengdan. Her insecurities in the Forbidden City and rejection of Qianlong's love result in trouble, thus leading to the climax of My Fair Princess II.

Mengdan

Hanxiang's lover, Mengdan, is part of the Uyghur tribe. He loved Hanxiang from his childhood, and although the two eloped seven times, they were unsuccessful because of Hanxiang's fragrance. With help from Xiaoyanzi and her friends, however, Mengdan is finally able to unite with Hanxiang.

Qing'er (Wang Yan)

Qing'er

The daughter of Qianlong's brother, Qing'er's parents died when she was young, so the empress dowager took her in as her foster daughter. Qing'er is proper, pretty, and intelligent, as well as a smooth talker, thus gaining the empress dowager's liking. Qing'er falls in love with Erkang, but when she returns to the Forbidden City from the empress dowager's religious pilgrimage, she finds that Erkang is already betrothed to Ziwei.

Xiao Jian

Xiaoyanzi first meets Xiao Jian, a lover of poetry and drinking, at Hui Bing Lou, a restaurant owned by Liu Qing and Liu Hong. He carries around two possessions: a bamboo flute ('xiao') and a sword ('jian'), hence his name. At first, he pretends he does not know any kung fu to avoid fighting with Xiaoyanzi, but later reveals his kung fu skills when he rescues Xiaoyanzi and Ziwei from beheading.

== My Fair Princess III characters ==
Xia Yingying (夏盈盈)

A relatively insignificant character in My Fair Princess III, Xia Yingying is a prostitute Qianlong meets on his trip to Jiangnan. The author, Chiung Yao, created this character exclusively for actress Jiang Qinqin. Qianlong is very taken by Xia Yingying, as she is charming and talented. However, because she came from a brothel, the empress dowager did not approve. Xia Yingying then decided to leave Qianlong, never reappearing in the story.

Musha (慕莎)

A princess from Burma, Musha and Erkang first meet on the battlefield, when Myanmar and China are at war. Disguised as a man, Musha falls in love with Erkang. After Erkang is hurt, she takes him to Burma for medical treatment. However, she gets Erkang addicted to cocaine. She later uses cocaine as a way to keep Erkang from leaving her for Ziwei. In the end, however, Musha lets Erkang and Ziwei reunite after discovering the deep love between them.

Chen Zhihua (陳知畫)

Known for her talent in painting ('hua'), Zhihua is accurately named. She is a daughter of the Chen family, a family that has close ties with the empress dowager. Hoping to find Yongqi a more proper wife who can bear a child, the empress dowager proposes a match between Zhihua and Yongqi. Although Yongqi first does not want a second wife, he reluctantly gives in when Xiao Jian's life is at risk. Zhihua later has Yongqi's child, Mian Yi, but in the end, Yongqi leaves the Forbidden City with Xiaoyanzi, abandoning Zhihua and her son.

Additional characters include Xiaoyanzi's and Ziwei's faithful eunuchs Xiao Dengzi and Xiao Zhuozi and their maids, Mingyue and Caixia. Unlike many other royals of the time, Xiaoyanzi and Ziwei treat their servants like family. Thus, their servants like them very much.
