= Yongji =

Yongji may refer to:

- Yongji, Shanxi (永济市), formerly Yongji County
- Yongji County, Jilin (永吉县)
- Yongji, Leiyang (永济镇), a town of Leiyang City, Hunan
- Yongji Canal, a component of the Grand Canal, China
- Yongji (永璂), (1755–1776), 12th son of the Qianlong Emperor and eldest son of Empress Nara
- Wanyan Yongji (完顏永濟) (1160-1213), Emperor of the Jin dynasty
