= Qing'er =

Qing'er may refer to:

- Xiaoqing (character), a fictional character from the Legend of the White Snake, also known as Qing'er (Chinese: 青兒; pinyin: Qīng ér)
- Qing'er (Chinese: 晴兒; pinyin: Qíng ér), a fictional character from Chiung Yao's TV series My Fair Princess, see List of My Fair Princess characters
- Lee Chi Ching (born 1963), Hong Kong manhua illustrator, pen name Ching-yi or Qing'er (Chinese: 清兒; pinyin: Qīng ér)

== See also ==
- Yao Qing'er (c. 1766–1784), Qing dynasty kunqu actress
- Erhua
