= Yongji (prince) =

Qing dynasty prince (1752–1776)

- Beile 貝勒
- Born: 7 June 1752; Beijing, China
- Died: 17 March 1776 (aged 23); Beijing, China
- Burial: Zhuahuashan, Eastern Qing tombs
- Consort: Lady Borjigit
Names
- Aisin Gioro Yongji (愛新覺羅·永璂)
- House: Aisin Gioro
- Father: Qianlong Emperor
- Mother: Empress Nara

Yongji (Chinese: 永璂; 7 June 1752–17 March 1776) was a Qing dynasty imperial prince and poet. He was the twelfth son of the Qianlong Emperor and the son of the Step Empress, Lady Nara. Despite being a legitimate son of the emperor and empress, his life changed dramatically after his mother's sudden fall from favor. As a result, he became politically marginalized and never received a noble title during his lifetime.

== Early life and background ==
Aisin-Gioro Yongji was born on 7 June 1752 at Yikun Palace (翊坤宮) in the Forbidden City. He was the twelfth son of the Qianlong Emperor. His mother was the Step Empress of the Ula-Nara clan, who was the empress at the time of his birth.

The Qianlong Emperor was pleased with Yongji's birth and gave him his name. Historian Xiang Jingzhi believes the name showed the emperor's hope that Yongji might one day inherit the throne. The character ji (璂) means a jade ornament used on a ruler's ceremonial cap.

Yongji studied with teachers at the imperial court. One of his tutors was the scholar and historian Qian Daxin (錢大昕), who taught him for two years. In a letter written after Yongji's death, Qian praised the prince for his good nature and character. He described him as having "a pure nature and exceptional character" (天資淳粹，至性過人).

== Mother's disgrace and loss of favor ==
During the Qianlong Emperor's fourth southern inspection tour in 1765, the Step Empress suddenly cut her hair, an act considered a serious taboo in Manchu culture. The emperor reacted strongly, placing her under house arrest and removing her imperial authority. She died the following year, when Yongji was fourteen years old.

Following his mother's fall from favor, Yongji's position at court declined significantly. Unlike several of his brothers, he was never granted a princely title and spent his life as an untitled member of the imperial clan (闲散宗室). In 1770, at the age of nineteen, Yongji married his primary consort, a woman of the Borjigit clan from the Abaga Right Banner.

== Literary works ==
Although Yongji did not play a major political role, he took part in scholarly activities. The Qianlong Emperor assigned him to help compile the general index of the Yuzhi Manmeng Wenjian (御制满蒙文鉴总纲), a Manchu–Mongolian dictionary. When the work was submitted in 1775, the emperor pointed out several errors but still acknowledged Yongji's contribution. Yongji was also interested in poetry. He left a collection of poems called Rike Shigao (日课诗稿), which includes his poems and literary notes.

== Death and legacy ==
Yongji died of illness on 17 March 1776 at the age of 23. Because of his mother's fall from favor, his funeral was held according to the standards of an imperial duke rather than a prince. He was buried at the Zhuahuashan (朱华山) princely garden tombs outside the Eastern Qing Tombs.

Because Yongji died without producing an heir, the Qianlong Emperor ordered that Miansi (绵偲), the biological fourth son of Yongji's older half-brother Prince Yongcheng, be adopted into Yongji's lineage to continue his family line.

After the death of the Qianlong Emperor, Yongji's status was partly restored. In 1799, the Jiaqing Emperor posthumously granted him the rank of Doroi beile (多罗贝勒) and revised his spirit tablet to reflect the honor.

== Scholarly interpretations ==
Historian Wang Zhiwei writes that the Qianlong Emperor wanted one of his sons born to an empress to inherit the throne. However, Wang notes that the emperor showed little favor to Yongji even in 1763, when his mother was still the empress. Wang also discusses a court painting from around that time showing the young Yongyan, who later became emperor. He suggests that the painting may show Qianlong's special interest in Yongyan, although it does not prove that Yongyan had already been chosen as heir.

Historian Bai Xinliang writes that Yongji lost his chance to inherit the throne after his mother fell out of favor in 1765. He says Yongji was quietly left out of the choice of heir. Bai also argues that Qianlong wanted to prevent his sons from fighting over the throne and therefore kept his choice of heir secret.

== In popular culture ==
- Portrayed by Shao Cong in the 1999 television series My Fair Princess II.
- Portrayed by Wu Tiezheng in the 2011 television series New My Fair Princess.
- Portrayed by Sun Ao in the 2018 television series Story of Yanxi Palace.
- Portrayed by Xu Lingchen in the 2018 television series Ruyi's Royal Love in the Palace.
- Portrayed by Kang Naixing in the 2022 television series Lord Jiaqing's Tour of Taiwan (嘉慶君遊台灣).
