= Noble Consort Yu (Qianlong) =

Chinese imperial consort (1714–1792)

Noble Consort Yu 愉贵妃
- Empress Dowager Chongqing celebrating her 80th birthday; Noble Consort Yu was then Concubine Yu
- Born: 15 June 1714 (康熙五十三年 五月 四日)
- Died: 9 July 1792 (aged 78) (乾隆五十七年 五月 二十一日); Yonghe Palace, Forbidden City
- Burial: Yu Mausoleum, Eastern Qing tombs
- Spouse: Qianlong Emperor (before 1735)
- Issue: Yongqi, Prince Rongchun of the First Rank
- House: Keliyete (珂里叶特; by birth); Aisin-Gioro (by marriage)

Chinese name
- Traditional Chinese: 愉貴妃
- Simplified Chinese: 愉贵妃
Transcriptions
Standard Mandarin
- Hanyu Pinyin: Yú Guìfēi

Noble Consort Yu (15 June 1714 – 9 July 1792), of the Mongol Bordered Blue Banner Keliyete clan, was a consort of the Qianlong Emperor of the Qing dynasty. She was three years his junior.

== Life ==
=== Family background ===
Noble Consort Yu's personal name was not recorded in history.

- Father: E'erjitu (額爾吉圖), served as a fifth rank literary official (员外郎)

=== Kangxi era ===
The future Noble Consort Yu was born on the fourth day of the fifth lunar month in the 53rd year of the reign of the Kangxi Emperor, which translates to 15 June 1714 in the Gregorian calendar.

=== Yongzheng era ===
It is not known when Lady Keliyete became a mistress of Hongli, the fourth son of the Yongzheng Emperor.

=== Qianlong era ===
The Yongzheng Emperor died on 8 October 1735 and was succeeded by Hongli, who was enthroned as the Qianlong Emperor. On 8 November 1735, Lady Keliyete was granted the rank of "First Attendant" with the honorific name "Hai". In 1736, she was elevated to "Noble Lady Hai". On 23 March 1741, Lady Keliyete gave birth to the emperor's fifth son, Yongqi. She was elevated in December 1741 or January 1742 to "Concubine Yu", and on 9 December 1745 to "Consort Yu".

Yongqi was the first among the Qianlong Emperor's sons to be made a prince of the first rank. Following Yongqi's death on 16 April 1766, Lady Keliyete lost the Qianlong Emperor's favor. She died on 9 July 1792. In 1793, the emperor posthumously honored her as "Noble Consort Yu" and had her interred in the Yu Mausoleum of the Eastern Qing tombs.

== Titles ==
- During the reign of the Kangxi Emperor (r. 1661–1722):
  - Lady Keliyete (珂里叶特氏)
- During the reign of the Yongzheng Emperor (r. 1722–1735):
  - Mistress (格格; from unknown date)
- During the reign of the Qianlong Emperor (r. 1735–1796):
  - First Attendant Hai (海常在; from 8 November 1735), seventh rank consort
  - Noble Lady Hai (海贵人; from 1736), sixth rank consort
  - Concubine Yu (愉嫔; from December 1741 or January 1742), fifth rank consort
  - Consort Yu (愉妃; from 9 December 1745), fourth rank consort
  - Noble Consort Yu (愉貴妃; from 23 November 1793), third rank consort

== Issue ==
- As noble lady:
  - Yongqi (永琪; 23 March 1741 – 16 April 1766), the Qianlong Emperor's fifth son, posthumously honoured as Prince Rongchun of the First Rank

== In popular culture ==
- Portrayed by Zhuang Qingning in New My Fair Princess (2011)
- Portrayed by Lian Lian in Story of Yanxi Palace (2018)
- Portrayed by Ning Chang in Ruyi's Royal Love in the Palace (2018)

== See also ==
- Ranks of imperial consorts in China § Qing
- Imperial and noble ranks of the Qing dynasty
