= Baby, Sorry =

- 宝贝，对不起
- Directed by: Pan Liping; Du Lin; Liu Ke; Li Rui; Wang Jun
- Production companies: Hunan Broadcasting System TV Channel; Guosheng Pictures（Beijing）Co., Ltd
- Distributed by: Guosheng Pictures（Beijing）Co., Ltd
- Release date: 31 January 2015
- Running time: 90 minutes
- Country: China
- Language: Mandarin
- Box office: CN¥4.18 million

Baby, Sorry (Chinese: 宝贝，对不起) is a 2015 Chinese reality family film directed by Pan Liping, Du Lin, Liu Ke, Li Rui and Wang Jun. It was released on 31 January 2015.

== Cast ==
- Wang Yan
- Wang Hongqin
- Steve Ma
- Ma Shitian
- Shao Bing
- Shao Zijiao
- Shao Ziheng
- Bin Bin
- Xiao Xiao Bin

== Reception ==
By 5 February, the film had earned CN¥4.18 million at the Chinese box office.
