= My Fair Princess III =

- Promotional image of the main cast in 2002 (l-r): Wang, Huang Xiaoming, Ku, Huang Yi, Zhou and Ma
- Also known as: Heavenly Earth
- Traditional Chinese: 還珠格格三之天上人間
- Simplified Chinese: 还珠格格三之天上人间
- Hanyu Pinyin: Huán Zhū Gégé Sān Zhī Tiānshàng Rénjiān
- Genre: costume drama soap opera historical fiction wuxia
- Created by: Chiung Yao
- Developed by: Chen Chung-wei
- Written by: Chiung Yao
- Directed by: Li Ping; Ting Yang-kuo
- Presented by: Ping Hsin-tao; Ouyang Changlin
- Starring: Huang Yi; Leo Ku; Ma Yili; Zhou Jie; Wang Yan; Huang Xiaoming; Ti Lung; Qin Lan; Liu Tao; Jiang Qinqin
- Composer: Xu Jingxin
- Countries of origin: China; Hong Kong
- Original languages: Mandarin; Burmese
- No. of episodes: 40

Production
- Executive producers: Liu Xiangqun; Ho Hsiu-chiung
- Producers: Ping Hsin-tao; Wei Wenbin
- Production locations: Beijing; Chengde Mountain Resort; Bashang Plateau; Yangzhou; Guangzhou
- Running time: 48 minutes
- Production companies: Hunan Broadcasting System; Ho Jan Entertainment International Limited

Original release
- Release: 7 July 2003

Related
- My Fair Princess (1998–1999); New My Fair Princess (2011)

My Fair Princess III, also called My Fair Princess III: Heavenly Earth, is a 2003 television drama and the sequel of the 2-season series My Fair Princess (1998–1999). A joint production between Ho Jan Entertainment International Limited (可人國際影視文化傳播有限公司) in Hong Kong and Hunan Broadcasting System in Mainland China, it was also written by Taiwanese novelist Chiung Yao.

Only 5 actors returned from the first 2 seasons (Zhou Jie, Wang Yan, Zhao Minfen, Wen Haibo and Liu Fang), while 12 recurring characters were portrayed by new actors, including central protagonists Xiaoyanzi, Xia Ziwei, Yongqi and Qianlong Emperor. For this reason the series was not well-received, although it still achieved moderately high ratings in mainland China.

== Plot ==
The story starts off with Xiaoyanzi accidentally losing a child. The empress dowager is now increasingly unhappy with Xiaoyanzi, believing she is not ladylike to be Yongqi's wife, particularly in carrying on the family line. At the same time, Qing'er and Xiaoyanzi's brother, Xiao Jian, are also in love. But empress dowager dislikes Xiao Jian, especially after when she finds that Xiaoyanzi and Xiao Jian's father was killed by Qianlong. She thinks that the siblings may want to kill Qianlong for revenge. Before she finds out this fact, they go to Chen's family during a travel, where she meets Zhihua. During the travel, Qianlong develops a crush on Xia Yingying, who he believes to be the reincarnation of Xia Yuhe, but everyone opposes him to take Yingying as his new consort, and during the process, the empress, who is no longer hostile to the main characters, cuts her hair, thus totally losing favor of the emperor. After being sent back, she lives like a nun.

The Dowager likes Zhihua more than Xiaoyanzi, and wants Zhihua to marry Yongqi. After returning to the imperial palace, the empress dowager makes a plan to separate Yongqi and Xiaoyanzi, Qing'er and Xiao Jian. She threatens them that she would kill Xiao Jian if Yongqi does not marry Zhihua, and requests that Zhihua should be wife and Xiaoyanzi should be a concubine. To save Xiao Jian's life, they accept the empress dowager's conditions and Xiao Jian is sent away.

Yongqi marries Zhihua, as the empress dowager requests, with Xiaoyanzi and Zhihua both as consorts. The empress dowager also sends many servants to come and serve the couple. First, they pretend that they really love each other. However, Zhihua really loves Yongqi, and forces him to bathe with her, which angers Xiaoyanzi. Although Yongqi gives in and marries Zhihua, Zhihua remains a virgin after marrying Yongqi for quite a long time. But eventually, Erkang and Ziwei persuade Xiaoyanzi that Zhihua has the right to have a child of Yongqi. Xiaoyanzi, being convinced, forces Yongqi to enter Zhihua's room. Not long later, Zhihua is found pregnant. Not much time after the news, both Yongqi and Erkang volunteer to go into war with Burma. In the war, when Erkang fights with the eighth 'prince', who he finds that 'he', or rather 'she', is actually the eighth princess, Musha. Musha is attracted to Erkang, and plans to take him back to Burma. Musha disguises another soldier to look like Erkang to make the Qings think that Erkang is dead. After the war ends, Yongqi is created Prince of Rong and Erkang "posthumously" Prince of Xian; Xiao Jian remains in Yunnan, because he is suspicious about Erkang's death.

Xiao Jian later discovers Erkang may not be dead and has been captured to Burma. Xiao Jian takes the news back to Yongqi, Xiaoyanzi, Ziwei, Qing'er in Beijing. The group travels to Burma in order to rescue Erkang. They initially ask Qianlong to let them go to Burma to rescue Erkang, but Qianlong doubts the news and refuses to let them go. They resolve to go to Burma on their own by sneaking out of the palace. Xiaoyanzi wants to stay in Yunnan, and she convinces Yongqi to stay with her. Zhihua hears their conversation and gets angry. Qianlong also asks to see the person who brought the news, Xiao Jian, but Xiao Jian refuses to see the emperor. Eventually, Xiao Jian is forced to make an appearance, and Zhihua tells everything that she knows. She tells Qianlong that Xiao Jian and Xiaoyanzi's parents were killed by Qianlong. Xiao Jian attempts to kill Qianlong, who is rescued by Yongqi.

Xiao Jian, raged, wants to kill Yongqi, but Xiaoyanzi pushes Xiao Jian out of the way. She convinces Xiao Jian that Yongqi was the love of her life. Qianlong, not knowing what to do, sends them all back to where they came from, and researches what really happened. Then, Qianlong calls them over to tell them what really happened to Xiaoyanzi and Xiao Jian's father. After that, Qianlong decides to let them go. Zhihua has become the sole consort after giving birth to a son with Xiaoyanzi finally degraded to a concubine, but Yongqi also abandons Zhihua and her son, and lives like a commoner with Xiaoyanzi, Qing'er and Xiao Jian. After finding Erkang, Xiao Jian and Qing'er are married. During their wedding, Xiaoyanzi announces that she is pregnant and decides to name her child Nan'er as Ziwei first child was named Dong'er. Meanwhile, the empress dies of illness, and Wet-Nurse Rong commits suicide for her mistress, and the emperor tells the world that both the empress and Prince of Rong have died. Years later, Erkang and the emperor go to visit them. They find that both couples are happy and they both have 4 children, and that Yongqi becomes a doctor. Unaware of the identity of the emperor, Nan'er simply takes him as a senior clansman and politely calls him "Grandfather". The couples are told that Zhihua is also not remarried and is living happily now. The season ends with both couples and their children sending the Emperor and Erkang off together, singing happily.

== Cast ==
- Huang Yi as Xiaoyanzi
- Ma Yili as Xia Ziwei
- Leo Ku as Yongqi
- Zhou Jie as Fu Erkang
- Wang Yan as Qing'er
- Huang Xiaoming as Xiao Jian
- Ti Lung as Qianlong Emperor
- Jiang Qinqin as Xia Yingying
- Qin Lan as Chen Zhihua
- Liu Tao as Princess Musha
- Jiang Lili as the empress
- Zhao Minfen as the empress dowager
- Chen Li as Consort Ling
- Qiao Chen as Wet-Nurse Rong
- Wen Haibo as Fu Lun
- Liu Fang as Fu Lun's wife
- Zang Jinsheng as Meng Bai
- Zhai Yujia as Xiaodengzi
- Zhang Tong as Xiaozhuozi
- Gong Yan as Mingyue
- Du Minhe as Caixia
- Jia Yunzhe as Dong'er
- Li Yaxi as Zhen'er
- Fan Rui as Cui'er
- Deng Limin as Minister Meng
- Wang Weiguang as Fu Heng
- Su Sheng as Chen Bangzhi
- Li Qing as Chen Bangzhi's wife

== Original soundtrack ==
No.	Title	Lyrics	Music	Artist	Length
1.	"天上人間" (Tiānshàng rénjiān, "Heavenly Earth")		Leo Ku	Leo Ku	04:09
2.	"問燕兒" (Wèn yàn er, "Asking Swallow")		Leo Ku	Leo Ku	03:32
3.	"在這離別時候" (Zài zhè líbié shíhou, "At This Time of Departure")		Leo Ku	Leo Ku	03:24
4.	"只要有你" (Zhǐyào yǒu nǐ, "As Long As I have You")		Chuang Li-fan	Leo Ku, Huang Yi, Zhou Jie, Ma Yili, Huang Xiaoming, Liu Tao	05:17
5.	"奈何" (Nàihé, "No Alternative")		Hsu Chia-liang	Liu Pan	03:53
6.	"最怕別離" (Zuì pà biélí, "Most Afraid of Departure")	Chiung Yao	Hsiang Chung-wei	Liu Pan	03:15
7.	"自君別後" (Zì jūn bié hòu, "Since You Left")	Chiung Yao	Hsu Chia-liang	Chen Sisi	03:46
8.	"天上人間會相逢" (Tiānshàng rénjiān huì xiāngféng, "Heavenly Earth Has Encounters")	Chiung Yao	Hsiao-chien	Liu Pan	04:25
9.	"小橋流水" (Xiǎoqiáo liúshuǐ, "Small Bridge, Flowing Water")	Chiung Yao	Hsu Chia-liang	Chen Sisi	03:50
10.	"西湖柳" (Xīhú liǔ, "Willow of the West Lake")	Chiung Yao	Lee Cheng-fan	Chen Sisi	04:10
11.	"山一程水一程" (Shān yī chéng shuǐ yī chéng, "A Journey of Mountains, a Journey of Waters")	Chiung Yao	Hsiang Chung-wei	Chen Sisi	03:56
12.	"重逢時刻" (Chóngféng shíkè, "The Moment of Reunion")	Chiung Yao	Hsiao-chien	Liu Pan	03:57
13.	"英雄出征" (Yīngxióng chūzhēng, "Heroes Go To War")	Hao Han	Hao Han	Zhaorite	03:35

Chiung Yao wrote all the lyrics except for Track 13, which was written by Hao Han.
