= Wang Yan (actress) =

Chinese actress (born 1974)

- Born: February 11, 1974 (age 52); Qingdao, Shandong, China
- Education: Beijing Dance Academy
- Occupation: actress
- Spouse: Wang Zhicai (married 1997)
- Children: "Qiuqiu", son (born 2006)

Chinese name
- Traditional Chinese: 王艷
- Simplified Chinese: 王艳
Transcriptions
Standard Mandarin
- Hanyu Pinyin: Wáng Yàn
- Musical career

Wang Yan (born February 11, 1974), is a Chinese actress, best known for portraying the character Qing'er in the TV series My Fair Princess II (1999) and My Fair Princess III (2003).

== Filmography ==
=== Films ===
Year	Title	Role	Notes
1993	Chivalrous Heroine (奇俠俏女鬧熱河)	Ximei	
1994	Back to Roots (歸土)	Xiuxiu	
1999	Having Guest at Home (客到我家)	Xiaochun	
1999	Congratulations to You (给您道喜了)	Lan Feiyan	
2009	Tiny Dust, True Love (寻找微尘)	HR supervisor	cameo
2011	Sun Yat-sen (第一大總統)	He Xiangning	
2015	Baby, Sorry (宝贝，对不起)		

=== Television series ===
Year	Title	Role	Notes
1993	Plum Blossom Scar (梅花烙)	Baihe	
1994	Eternity (地久天長)	Jiang Shan	
1994	Blue Star, Black Star (蓝星星黑星星)	Xuemei	
1994	Buildings in Fog (煙鎖重樓)	Zeng Jingxuan	
1995	This Life (今生今世)	Xiaolan	
1999	My Fair Princess (還珠格格) (season 2)	Qing'er	
2000	Star Creation (明星制造)	Shen Xiaoyan	
2000	New May Flower (新一剪梅)	Wan Qiuling	
2001	Mission of the Warriors (武林外史)	Bai Feifei	
2001	Romance in the Rain (情深深雨濛濛)	Pingping	
2002	Taiji Prodigy (少年張三豐)	Zhao Yu'er	
2002	Secret Murder, Amazing Cases (無敵縣令)	Zhao Ningxiang	
2003	My Fair Princess III (還珠格格三之天上人間)	Qing'er	sequel to the 1999 series
2003	Love on the Edge of Life and Death (爱在生死边缘)	Ye Xiaonan	
2004	The Four Detective Guards (四大名捕)	Shui Furong	
2004	Seven Warriors (七武士)	Hua Jieyu	
2004	The Flower Spirit (花姑子)	Zhong Suqiu	
2004	Warriors of the Yang Clan (楊門虎將)	Mao Xiaoying	
2005	The Juvenile Qian Long Emperor (少年寶親王)	Guo Yun	
2005	Sigh of His Highness (一生為奴)	Jiajia	
2006	Justice Department (青天衙門)	Ziyu	
2006	Black and White Door (黑白之门)	Mianmian	
2006	Crazy King and General Iron (鐵將軍阿貴)	Yu Ruyi	
2006	Red Cross Constellation (红十字星座)	Qiao Siyu	
2008	The So-called Marriage (所谓婚姻)	Shan Yun	
2010	Nan Grudge (南城遺恨)	Murong Fei	
2010	Meteor, Butterfly, Sword (流星蝴蝶劍)	Gao Jiping	
2010	Golden Wedding (金婚风雨情)	Tao Jie	
2011	Pretty Housewife (漂亮主妇)	Tian Wan	
2012	The Legend of Zhong Kui (鍾馗傳說)	Jin Xiangxue	
2013	Old Days In Shanghai (像火花像蝴蝶)	Sun Yuzhen	
2019	Chong Er's Preach 重耳传奇	Consort Hu	
2019	Please Give Me a Pair of Wings 请赐我一双翅膀	Sister Feng	
TBA	Home in Tiexi (家在铁西)		
