= Yongqi, Prince Rong =

Qing dynasty prince (1741–1766)

Yongqi
- Prince Rong of the First Rank 和碩榮親王

Head of the House of Prince Rong peerage
- Tenure: 1765–1766
- Predecessor: peerage created
- Successor: Mianyi
- Born: 23 March 1741; Beijing, China
- Died: 16 April 1766 (aged 25); Beijing, China
- Burial: Beijing, China
- Consorts: Lady Sirin Gioro
- Issue: Mianyi, Prince Rongke of the Second Rank; Lady of the Second Rank
Names
- Aisin Gioro Yongqi (愛新覺羅·永琪)
Posthumous name
- Prince Rongchun of the First Rank (榮純親王)
- House: Aisin Gioro
- Father: Qianlong Emperor
- Mother: Noble Consort Yu

Yongqi
- Chinese: 永琪
Transcriptions
Standard Mandarin
- Hanyu Pinyin: Yǒngqí

Junting (courtesy name)
- Chinese: 筠亭
Transcriptions
Standard Mandarin
- Hanyu Pinyin: Jūntíng

Tengqin Jushi (art name)
- Chinese: 藤琴居士
Transcriptions
Standard Mandarin
- Hanyu Pinyin: Téngqín Jūshì

Yongqi (23 March 1741 – 16 April 1766), courtesy name Junting, art name Tengqin Jushi, formally known as Prince Rong, was a Manchu prince of the Qing dynasty. He was the fifth son of the Qianlong Emperor. Arguably the most outstanding among the Qianlong Emperor's sons, he was, at one point, considered by his father as a potential heir to the throne. However, he died prematurely at the age of 25.

== Life ==
Yongqi was born in the Manchu Aisin Gioro clan as the fifth son of the Qianlong Emperor. His mother was Noble Consort Yu (愉貴妃), who was from the Mongol Keliyete (珂里葉特) clan.

Yongqi was studious and diligent from a young age. Every day, of all the princes, he was the earliest to reach the palace study to attend classes. He had a close relationship with his younger brother, Yongyan. Yongqi was talented - he was fluent in the Manchu and Mongol languages, he was versed in astronomy, geography and calendrical calculation. One of his works was the Jiaotong Tenggao (蕉桐幐稿).

Yongqi was versed in poetry, painting, and calligraphy. He was also skilled in horse-riding and mounted archery. His talents earned him the favour of his father, the Qianlong Emperor. In 1763, a fire broke out in the Old Summer Palace, and Yongqi carried his father on his back and brought him to safety. Two years later, the Qianlong Emperor conferred Yongqi the title "Prince Rong of the First Rank", making Yongqi the first of the Qianlong Emperor's sons to officially receive a princely title. Besides the Chinese character "Rong" (榮) in the title literally means "glory" or "honour", which showed that the Qianlong Emperor had high hopes for Yongqi.

Yongqi died in 1766 after suffering from bone tuberculosis for several months. He was already ill when he was made "Prince Rong". He was granted the posthumous name "Chun" (純; "pure"), so his full posthumous title was extended to "Prince Rongchun of the First Rank" (榮純親王).

== Tomb ==
Yongqi was buried with the Qianlong Emperor's eldest son, Yonghuang (永璜; 1728–1750), who also died in his 20s. The tomb, sometimes referred to as the "Crown Prince Tomb" (太子陵), is located in northern part of eastern Beijing near Bulaotun Town (不老屯鎮). In 1958 the tomb was demolished to make way for the construction of the Miyun Reservoir (密雲水庫). Its contents were carefully excavated and transferred to the Capital Museum.

== Former residence ==
Yongqi and his descendants were merged under the Bordered Red Banner of the Eight Banners. Yongqi's house later became the residence of Prince Chun in the later part of the Qing dynasty. A Prince Rong Residence is located in the southwest of present-day Beijing at Xuanwu Gate on the west side of Taiping Lake.

== Appraisal ==
Yongqi's mother was not one of the highly ranked consorts of the Qianlong Emperor, but yet Yongqi was instated as a Prince of the First Rank, and there were signs that the emperor had considered designating Yongqi as his heir. Another two princes, Yonglian and Yongcong, became first-rank princes because they were born to Empress Xiaoxianchun. As such it was believed that the Qianlong Emperor truly favoured and loved Yongqi.

Yongqi was the most outstanding of the Qianlong Emperor's sons and the best choice to succeed his father, but it was unfortunate that he died at a young age of 25. In 1793, when the Qianlong Emperor met British envoy George Macartney he told the latter that he regarded Yongqi highly because of his many talents, and that it was a pity that he died early.

== Family ==
Primary Consort

- Imperial Princess Consort Rongchun, of the Sirin Gioro clan (榮純亲王妃 西林覺羅氏)
  - Sixth son (9 November 1765 – 29 November 1765)

Secondary Consort

- Secondary consort, of the Socoro clan (側福晉 索綽羅氏)
  - First son (4 July 1759 – 7 July 1759)
  - Third son (12 January 1762 – 19 August 1763)
  - Fourth son (10 September 1764 – 4 November 1764)
  - Mianyi, Prince Rongke of the Second Rank (榮恪郡王 綿億; 10 September 1764 – 14 April 1815), fifth son

Concubine

- Mistress, of the Hu clan (胡氏)
  - Second son (3 March 1760)
  - Lady of the Second Rank (縣君; 16 June 1762 – 9 December 1780), first daughter
    - Married Wangqinbanba'er (旺親班巴爾; 1755–1804) of the Alxa Borjigit clan in January/February 1780
  - Second daughter (3 February 1764 – 14 January 1765)
- Mistress Ru (d. 1766)

== In fiction and popular culture ==
- Portrayed by Alec Su in My Fair Princess (1998)
- Portrayed by Leo Ku in My Fair Princess III (2003)
- Portrayed by Zhang Rui in New My Fair Princess (2011)
- Portrayed by Chen Youwei in Story of Yanxi Palace (2018)
- Portrayed by Qu Chuxiao in Ruyi's Royal Love in the Palace (2018)

== See also ==
- Royal and noble ranks of the Qing dynasty
- Ranks of imperial consorts in China#Qing
