= Zang Jinsheng =

Chinese actor (born 1959)

- 臧金生
- Born: 11 May 1959 (age 67); Tianjin, China
- Education: Beijing Film Academy
- Occupation: Actor
- Years active: 1985–present
- Spouse: Lu Ping (m. 1987)
- Children: 1

Zang Jinsheng (Chinese: 臧金生; pinyin: Zāng Jīnshēng; born 11 May 1959) is a Chinese actor. He is a member of the China Television Artists Association, Institute of Broadcasting and Television of China, and China Film Association. He is best known for portraying Lu Zhishen and Zhu Bajie in the television series The Water Margin (1998) and Journey to the West (2011) respectively.

== Early life ==
Zang was born in Tianjin on 11 May 1959. He worked in a factory during the Cultural Revolution and also served in the People's Liberation Army.

In 1982, Zang enrolled in the Beijing Film Academy, where he majored in acting. He was assigned to the Beijing Film Studio as an actor after graduating in 1986.

== Acting career ==
Zang began his career by appearing in minor roles in television series and films such as Gold King, The Case of the Silver Snake, Warrioress Errant Hei Hudie, Dragon Year Cops, After Separation, Monk Jigong and Ye Jianying. In 1993, he played Wuzhu, a general of the Jin dynasty, in the historical television series The Life of Yue Fei.

Zang rose to prominence in 1998 for portraying "Flowery Monk" Lu Zhishen in the television series The Water Margin, which was adapted from Shi Nai'an's classical novel of the same title.

In 2001, Zang appeared in a minor role as Monk Bujie in the wuxia television series Laughing in the Wind, an adaptation of Hong Kong writer Jin Yong's novel The Smiling, Proud Wanderer. He also played Hsinbyushin in the ancient costume comedy My Fair Princess III (2003), which was adapted from Taiwanese writer Chiung Yao's novels.

In 2008, Zang portrayed Zhang Fei in John Woo's Red Cliff, an epic war film based on the Battle of Red Cliffs. In 2009, he played Xie Xun in The Heaven Sword and Dragon Saber, a wuxia television series adapted from Jin Yong's novel of the same title. He also had a minor role as Qin Shi Huang in the television series The Myth (2010).

In 2011, Zang co-starred with Wu Yue, Nie Yuan and Elvis Tsui in Journey to the West as Zhu Bajie. The series had one of the highest viewership ratings in mainland China that year. In 2012, Zang played Duoji in Turbulence of the Mu Clan, a historical television series starring South Korean actress Choo Ja-hyun.

== Personal life ==
Zang married singer Lu Ping (卢萍), a graduate student in folk music at the Central Conservatory of Music, when he was 28. Their son, Zang Jian (臧剑), was born in 1988.

== Filmography ==
=== Film ===
Year	English title	Chinese title	Role	Notes
1985	Gold King	淘金王	Xu Tianxiong	
1986		一马走江湖	Dou Erdun	
1988	The Case of the Silver Snake	银蛇谋杀案	Shi Hengshan	
1988	Warrioress Errant Hei Hudie	游侠黑蝴蝶	Hei Xiong	
1989		山魂霹雳	Dayan	
1990	Dragon Year Cops	龙年警官	guest	
1990		血泊皇陵	Liu Yunpeng	
1992	War of Divorce	离婚大战	Lunzi	
1993	Human Night in Painted Skin	画皮之阴阳法王	Ran'gong	
1994	After Separation	大撒把	guest	
1997		大风堂	guest	
2003		同喜同喜	Brother Wu	
2004		良心作证	Zhang Ziqiang	
2008	Red Cliff	赤壁	Zhang Fei	
2008	Fit Lover	爱情呼叫转移2	guest	
2009		赤壁：决战天下	Zhang Fei	
2013	Out of Inferno	逃出生天3D		

=== Television ===
Year	English title	Chinese title	Role	Notes/Ref.
1989	Monk Jigong	济公活佛	Han Tianpeng	
1992	Ye Jianying	叱咤香洲叶剑英	Yuan Dai	
1993	The Life of Yue Fei	说岳后传	Wuzhu	
1994	Mountains and Plains	山野	Zhuhongbizi	
1996	The Water Margin	水浒传	Lu Zhishen	
1998		喜鹊东南飞	Yu Fengkui	
2000		边城落日	a bandit	
2001	Laughing in the Wind	笑傲江湖	Monk Bujie	
2002	Princess Is Going to Married	格格要出嫁	Ejei Khan	
2002	Rove Wander	浪迹天涯	Businessman Tao	
2002	Guanxi Limitless Knife	关西无极刀	a swordsman	
2003	My Fair Princess III	还珠格格3	Hsinbyushin	
2004	Unhappy Marriage	啼笑因缘	General Liu	
2004	The Story of Han Dynasty	大汉风	Wang Li	
2004	Female of Han Dynasty	大汉巾帼	Xiang Yu	
2004	Wudang	武当	Hengmei	
2004	Story of Drunken Zhang San	醉侠张三	His Royal Highness	
2005	Heroes of the War	喋血英雄	Li Yiwen	
2005	Clan Feuds	大旗英雄传	Pilihuo	
2005	Tang Paradise	大唐芙蓉园	An Lushan	
2006	Empress Dowager Feng	北魏冯太后	Tuoba Zitui	
2006	The Rise of the Tang Empire	贞观之治	Dou Jiande	
2006	Home with Kids	家有儿女3		
2006	Let's Remarry	我们复婚吧		
2007	The Case of Yang Sanjie	杨三姐告状	General Xiong	
2007	Children of Hongqiqu	红旗渠的儿女们	Brother He	
2009	The Heaven Sword and Dragon Saber	倚天屠龙记	Xie Xun	
2009		大瓷商		
2010	The Myth	神话	Qin Shi Huang	
2010	A Race-Course	跑马场	Prince Gong	
2010		风华正茂	Wu Peifu	
2010	Have No Choice	别无选择	Zhong Dawei	
2011	Journey to the West	西游记	Zhu Bajie	
2011	New My Fair Princess	新还珠格格	Liang Tinggui	
2011	Happy Angel	快乐俏天使		
2011	Susan	苏三	Monk Yin'guo	
2012	Turbulence of the Mu Clan	木府风云	Duoji	
2012	Cao Cao	盖世英雄曹操	Xun Yu	
2017	Yu Chenglong	于成龙	Oboi	
2020	Qin Dynasty Epic	大秦賦	Pang Nuan	
