= Yao Qing'er =

Chinese actress (died 1784)

Yao Qing (Chinese: 姚磬; pinyin: Yáo Qìng, c. 1766–1784), born Yao Zhangzhen (Chinese: 姚掌珍; pinyin: Yáo Zhǎngzhēn) and better known as Yao Qing'er (Chinese: 姚磬兒; pinyin: Yáo Qìng'ér), was a Chinese kunqu actress of the Qing dynasty who performed in Nanjing. Because she was sold by her father and raised by a man named Liang Si (梁四, "Liang Four"), she was also known as Liang Qing'er.

Her ill-fated love with the young scholar Zhan Yingjia was well known among the literati of the time and formed the basis of at least two (now lost) plays in the Qing dynasty. She was also the first Chinese opera actress known to have specialized in jing (powerful male) roles.

== Life ==
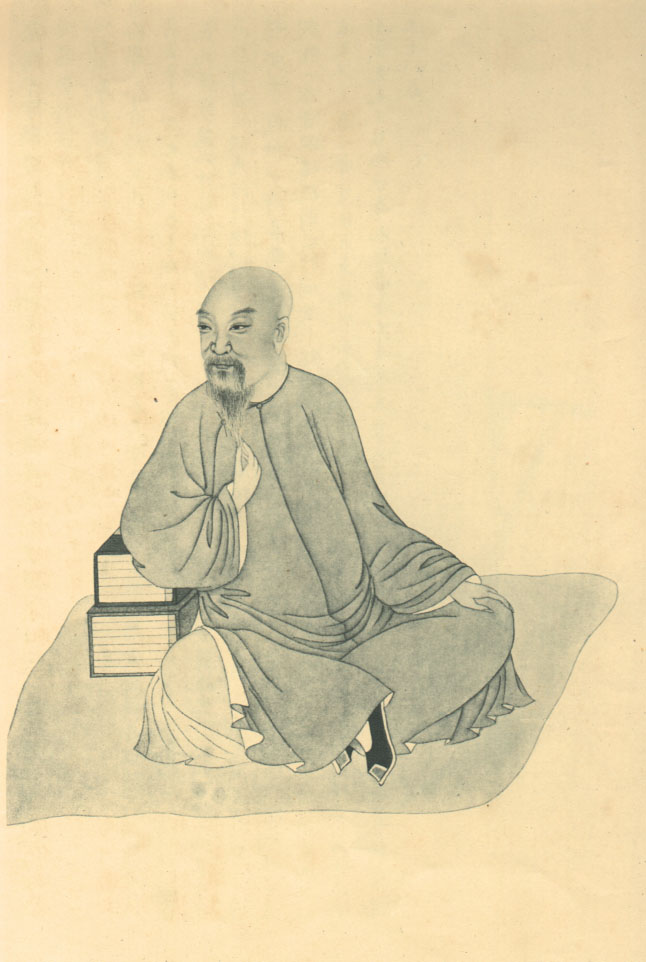
A portrait of her lover Zhan Yingjia in his later years.

Several books have recorded her life in various details. She was from Suzhou, but her ancestral home was She County, Anhui. When she was a child, her mother died and her father sold her to Liang Si for a large sum. Liang Si's wife was a former courtesan known for her pipa skills, and she ran a kunqu troupe in Nanjing after her marriage. The actors were all young girls bought by her husband and trained by her. Qing'er tried to run away several times, but each time she was caught and "beaten daily". Thereafter she declared her desire to play male heroes (jing roles) on stage so that she could vent her frustrations at being a female. The troupe then staged some productions featuring jing roles starring her.

One year, the scholar Zhan Yingjia (also known as Zhan Xiangting) came to Nanjing and took the provincial examination. Remaining in the city to wait for the result, he treated his friends to a viewing of Farewell My Concubine. Zhan told his companions that the actor playing the hero Xiang Yu was a girl, but his friends all laughed at him. However, they were all impressed when Yao washed the paint off her face and came out to meet them.

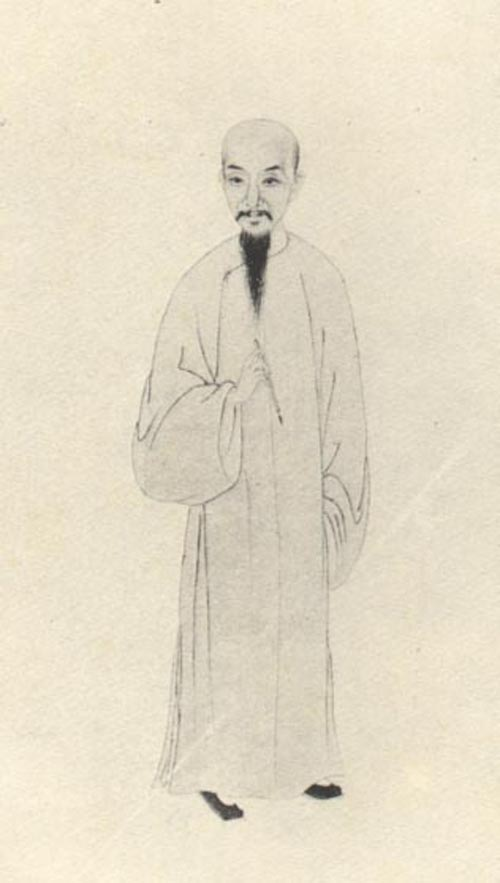
Zhan Yingjia's friend Wang Qisun, who also knew Yao personally. Both He and his wife Cao Zhenxiu wrote about Yao after her death.

Zhan was also from Suzhou, and his ancestral home was Wuyuan County (near She County), so he understood Yao's native dialect. They soon became lovers and as noted by his friends Wang Qisun and Shen Qifeng, inseparable during banquets and gatherings. When it was time for him to head back to Suzhou, he approached Liang Si with the intention of redeeming and marrying her, but Liang would not sell her for anything less than "a million".

In Shen Qifeng's colorful account of her life, Yao allegedly told Zhan that she would not live without him and that her bones would not be worth much compared to her life. Not even two months after he returned to Suzhou, Zhan received the news that Yao died of an illness. Heartbroken, he hurried back to Nanjing, spent "three hundred golds" to transport her coffin back to Suzhou. According to Shen Qifeng, she was buried north of the Tongjing Bridge (桐涇橋), but according to the book Xu Banqiao Zaji (續板橋雜記) by Zhuquan Jushi (珠泉居士; "Resident of the Pearl Creek"), which quotes a Shen Zijie (沈子潔), she was buried on the western side of the Zailai Pavilion (再來亭) on Tiger Hill, Suzhou.

Both Wang Qisun and his wife Cao Zhenxiu wrote on her tomb inscription.

== In fiction ==
To commemorate her, Shen Qifeng wrote a chuanqi play titled Qianjin Xiao (千金笑; "The Laughter of a Thousand Golds"). The play is now lost, but a story titled "The Biography of Yao Qing'er" (姚磬兒傳) was written by his brother Shen Qingrui, in which more twists were added. According to this story, Yao Qing'er jumped into the Qinhuai River to kill herself when Liang Si refused to let her marry Zhan Yingjia. She was saved by others just as her father came to redeem her. They started to sail back to Suzhou on the Yangtze and just as she looked forward to the good life ahead of her, the ship was attacked by pirates. Yao was terribly shaken and died.

Another playwright Qu Xie (瞿頡) also wrote a play about her titled Tongjing Yue (桐涇月).
