= Jiang Lili =

Chinese actress (born 1954)

- Born: December 18, 1954 (age 71); Harbin, Heilongjiang, China
- Education: Beijing Film Academy
- Occupation: Actress
- Years active: 1976–present
- Spouse: Wang Baosheng (汪宝生)
- Children: 1

Chinese name
- Chinese: 姜黎黎
Transcriptions
Standard Mandarin
- Hanyu Pinyin: Jiāng Lílí

Jiang Lili (born 18 December 1954) is a Chinese actress, best known for starring in numerous films in the 1980s. She currently resides in the U.S., where she also did some projects (e.g. the 2016 short film Kayla's World), but her career focus remains in China.

Her husband Wang Baosheng (汪宝生) appeared in many film with her, although he retired from acting in the 1990s. Her niece Jiang Yuan (姜嫄) is also an actress.

== Filmography ==
=== Film ===
| Year | English title | Original title | Role | Notes |
|---|---|---|---|---|
| 1975 | On the Banks of Yanming Lake | 雁鸣湖畔 | | |
| 1977 | Submerged Reef | 暗礁 | Chang Ming | |
| 1978 | Lamp | 灯 | | |
| 1979 | Sacred Duty | 神圣的使命 | Yang Qiong | |
| 1980 | Red Peony | 紅牡丹 | Wang Lian | |
| 1980 | Leftover Snow | 残雪 | You Li | |
| 1981 | A Girl's Wish | 姑娘的心愿 | Wei Zhihua | |
| 1981 | Smiling Is Better Than Crying | 笑比哭好 | Lu Xiaomei | |
| 1982 | All the Colours of the Rainbow | 赤橙黄绿青蓝紫 | Ye Fang | |
| 1982 | After Being Trapped | 誘捕之後 | Ye Yuzhi | |
| 1984 | A Red Skirt Is Fashionable On the Street | 街上流行红裙子 | Ge Jia | |
| 1984 | The 13th District | 十三号地区 | Shao Weiping | |
| 1986 | The Great Battle in Zhifeng | 直奉大戰 | | |
| 1988 | Panda Story | パンダ物語 | | |
| 1989 | The King Gunner of His Times | 一代槍王 | Sai Jinhua | |
| 1990 | Eyes of the People | 九千六百万双眼睛 | Sha Feifei | |
| 1991 | Mandara | 曼荼羅 | | |
| 1991 | The Story of a Songstress | 女歌星的故事 | Han Xue | |
| 1992 | Midnight Taxi | 午夜出租车 | Mei Liping | |
| 1997 | Standing Firm at the Tidal Bore | 挺立潮头 | | |
| 1997 | The Story of Beigang | 北钢纪事 | | |

=== TV Series ===
| Year | English title | Original title | Role | Notes |
|---|---|---|---|---|
| 1980 | Princess Xiangling | 響鈴公主 | | |
| 1989 | Soul of the Pear Garden | 魂系梨園 | | |
| 1992 | Feeling Like First Love | 情同初恋 | Yufeng | |
| 1992 | Stories of an Editorial Board | 编辑部的故事 | Yu Deli's wife | |
| 1996 | Love Shields You from the Storm | 爱情为你遮风雨 | | |
| 1998 | The Strange Case of Double Phoenix | 雙鳳奇案 | Empress Dowager Zhang | |
| 2000 | Crouching Tiger, Hidden Dragon | 臥虎藏龍 | Madame Yu | |
| 2002 | The Invincible Magistrate | 無敵縣令 | Wang Gu | |
| 2003 | My Fair Princess 3 | 還珠格格三之天上人間 | Ulanara, the Step Empress | |
| 2003 | The Playboy Tang Bohu | 風流少年唐伯虎 | Hongyu | |
| 2003 | Romantic Crystal Love | 水晶之恋 | Su Qi | |
| 2004 | So Rich in Beauty | 如此多嬌 | Qi Fei | |
| 2004 | Thirteen Sons of Heaven Bridge | 天橋十三郎 | Ding Xiulian | |
| 2004 | Miracle | 奇迹 | Qiangwei | |
| 2005 | Touching Venus | 维纳斯之恋 | Madame Qiao | |
| 2006 | Carving Time | 雕刻时光 | Song Weiran | |
| 2006 | The Drunken Hero Zhang San | 醉拳张三 | Zhang San's aunt | |
| 2006 | Unpeaceful Nights | 夜深不宁静 | Li Meiping | |
| 2007 | Strong Love | 烈爱 | Meishan | |
| 2009 | A Woman Without Regret | 女人无悔 | Cui Wenjun's mother | |
| 2014 | Yun Shen | 云婶 | Lin Lan | |
| 2014 | Moment in Peking | 新京華煙雲 | Madame Tseng | |
| 2016 | Be My Dad | 下辈子还做我老爸 | Mei Jie | |
| 2017 | Love, Just Come | 爱，来的刚好 | Xu Qinglun | |

== Awards and nominations ==
| Year | # | Award | Category | Work | Result |
|---|---|---|---|---|---|
| 1981 | 3rd | Little Hundred Flowers Awards | Best Actress | Red Peony | Won |
| 1983 | 6th | Hundred Flowers Awards | Best Supporting Actress | All the Colours of the Rainbow | Won |
