= My Fair Princess =

Taiwanese television drama series

- Promotional image of the main cast in 1998 (l-r): Back: Su, Fan and Zhou, Front: Zhao, Zhang and Lin
- Also known as: Princess Returning Pearl; Princess Returned Pearl; Princess Pearl; Princess Huan Zhu; The Return Princess; Return of the Pearl Princess
- Traditional Chinese: 還珠格格
- Simplified Chinese: 还珠格格
- Hanyu Pinyin: Huán Zhū Gége
- Jyutping: Waan^{4} Zyu^{1} Gaak^{3}-Gaak^{3}
- Genre: Costume drama; teen drama; soap opera; comedy drama; wuxia; historical
- Created by: Chiung Yao
- Developed by: Chen Chung-wei
- Written by: Chiung Yao
- Directed by: Sun Shu-pei; Li Ping (Season 2 only)
- Presented by: Chiung Yao; Ping Hsin-tao; Ouyang Changlin
- Starring: Zhao Wei; Ruby Lin; Alec Su; Zhou Jie; Zhang Tielin; Fan Bingbing
- Opening theme: Season 1: "Dang" (當) performed by Power Station; Season 2: "Zicong You Le Ni" (自從有了你) performed by Zhao Wei
- Ending theme: Season 1: "Yu die" (雨蝶) performed by Lee E-jun; Season 2: 1. "You Yige Guniang" (有一個姑娘) performed by Zhao Wei; 2. "Ni Shi Feng'er Wo Shi Sha" (你是風兒我是沙) performed by Ruby Lin and Zhou Jie
- Composer: Xu Jingxin
- Country of origin: (Taiwan)
- Original languages: Mandarin some Tibetan (Season 1) some Uyghur (Season 2)
- No. of seasons: 2
- No. of episodes: 24 (Season 1); 48 (Season 2)

Production
- Executive producers: Chen Tao-lung (Season 1); Tu Chi-chung (Season 2)
- Producers: Ping Hsin-tao; Ho Hsiu-chiung; Wei Wenbin
- Production locations: Beijing; Chengde Mountain Resort; Bashang Plateau
- Running time: 48 minutes
- Production companies: Yi Ren Communications Co. Hunan Broadcasting System

Original release
- Network: China Television
- Release: 28 April 1998 – 25 June 1999

Related
- My Fair Princess III (2003); New My Fair Princess (2011)

My Fair Princess, also known as Return of the Pearl Princess or Princess Returning Pearl (Chinese: 還珠格格), is a Chinese-language period drama jointly produced by Yi Ren Communications Co. (怡人傳播公司) of Taiwan and Hunan Economic Television (湖南經濟電視台) (now under Hunan Broadcasting System (HBS)) of China. Season 1 (1998) and Season 2 (1999) were first aired on China Television in Taiwan, followed by Hunan Economic Television in China. Season 3 (2003) was filmed with a largely different cast, receiving mixed reviews and less popularity.

Written by Chiung Yao, the story is set in 18th-century Qing dynasty during the Qianlong Emperor's reign. It follows tomboyish and innocent Xiaoyanzi, an orphaned and semi-literate vagrant in Beijing who, after befriending the emperor's illegitimate daughter Xia Ziwei, becomes a princess in place of her by accident. Although partially based on historical events and figures, the drama employs considerable artistic license.

Originally produced on a small budget with a cast of little-known young actors, My Fair Princess became one of the most successful Chinese shows of all time, launching the careers of Zhao Wei, Ruby Lin and Fan Bingbing. The frequently replayed show went off air in China from 2015 to 2017 after Chiung Yao severed ties with HBS and revoked its copyright due to her dispute with Yu Zheng over his plagiarism of her work in another HBS show. Chiung Yao reconciled with HBS and regranted the copyright in 2018. Since 2021, the first two seasons of the show have been blacklisted in China following Fan Bingbing’s tax scandal and the government’s ban on Zhao Wei.

== Origin ==
After a successful writing career which saw many of her works adapted into films and television series, Taiwanese romance novelist Chiung Yao and her publisher husband Ping Hsin-tao established Yi Ren Communications Co. in 1985 to produce television dramas. In 1987, the Republic of China government on Taiwan began to allow visits to People's Republic of China for the first time since the end of the Chinese Civil War in 1949. In 1988, during her first trip to China since her family relocated to Taiwan, Chiung Yao became friends with Ouyang Changlin, then a reporter working for Hunan Broadcasting System, who encouraged her to start producing dramas in China due to more diverse landscape and cheaper labor cost.

In 1989, Chiung Yao began filming for the first time in China in Changsha, Hunan, assisted by HBS and Beijing Television (BTV). Most of the actors, equipment, and production crew came from Taiwan, while the Chinese stations produced chiefly cheap labor (such as extra actors) in exchange for broadcasting rights in China. Being the first Taiwanese television production assisted by Chinese stations, the drama Wan-chun ran into many problems with the Taiwanese government. However, as years went by, restrictions in Taiwan loosened and Chiung Yao began to use more and more mainland Chinese actors and crew members in her productions, such as director Li Ping. With the reform and opening up, the quality of China's television production improved in the 1990s and the market began to grow. By 1992, HBS was no longer just a collaborator in Chiung Yao's productions but a financial partner and a co-producer.

In 1995, Ouyang founded Hunan Economic Television as a competitor to his former employer, HBS, during the government-led television reforms in Hunan. As Chiung Yao had an agreement with Taiwan's China Television (CTV) to produce two dramas for CTV for 1998, Ouyang and Chiung Yao decided to produce them together. The first drama, Tears in Heaven (蒼天有淚), featured a more established cast of Jiang Qinqin, Vincent Chiao, Athena Chu, Chen Chao-jung and Deng Jie and was anticipated to be more successful, drawing considerable resources from the companies. The second drama of the year was thus left with a limited budget.

In 1997, during a tour of Beijing, Chiung Yao passed Gongzhufen (literally "Princess's Tomb"). She was told of the story behind the place: according to legend, Qianlong Emperor had adopted a commoner-born daughter who, after her death, was buried there alone as she was deemed unfit to be buried with the Manchu princesses. Nothing else was known about her. Using this legend, Chiung Yao wrote My Fair Princess as the second drama series.

== Cast and characters ==
- Zhao Wei as Xiaoyanzi
- Ruby Lin as Xia Ziwei and Xia Yuhe (Season 1)
- Alec Su as Yongqi
- Zhou Jie as Fu Erkang
- Zhang Tielin as Qianlong Emperor
- Fan Bingbing as Jinsuo
- Dai Chunrong as the Empress
- Zhao Lijuan as Consort Ling
- Li Mingqi as Wet-Nurse Rong
- Lu Shiyu as Liu Qing
- Chen Ying as Liu Hong
- Wen Haibo as Fu Lun
- Liu Fang as Fu Lun's wife
- Xue Yan as Xiaodengzi
- Li Nan (Season 1) as Xiaozhuozi
  - Liu Wei (Season 2) as Xiaozhuozi
- Yu Mengjie as Mingyue
- Liu Fangyu (Season 1) as Caixia
  - Li Bingqiao (Season 2) as Caixia
- Julian Chen as Fu Ertai (Season 1)
- Zhang Heng as Princess Saiya (Season 1)
- Liu Dan as Ji Xiaolan (Season 1)
- Zhang Wei as Fu Heng (Season 1)
- You Long as E Min (Season 1)
- Liu Wei as Liang Tinggui (Season 1)
- Wang Yi as Baleben (Season 1)
- Miao Haojun as Sai Wei (Season 1)
- Zhu Jinglong as Sai Guang (Season 1)
- Ai Yang as Dongxue (Season 1)
- Dong Wei as Lamei (Season 1)
- Yang Dong as Cailian (Season 1)
- Zheng Jiaxin as Du Ruolan (Season 1)
- Zhao Minfen as the Empress Dowager (Season 2)
- Wang Yan as Qing'er (Season 2)
- Liu Dan as Hanxiang (Season 2)
- Zhu Hongjia as Xiao Jian (Season 2)
- Mou Fengbin as Mengdan (Merdan) (Season 2)
- Chen Yifang as Weina (Season 2)
- Zhong Xiaodan as Jina (Season 2)
- Yin Wei as Ali Hezhuo (Ali Khoja) (Season 2)
- Xu Fulai as Shop-Owner Du (Season 2)
- Wang Hong as Shop-Owner Du's wife (Season 2)
- Hu Yasi as Xiaogezi (Season 2)
- Zhai Yuerong as Wet-Nurse Gui (Season 2)

=== Casting ===
In the mid-1990s, Taiwanese agent Lee Ching-ping was in Beijing scouting for prospective local actors when a referrer sent her a tape of the obscure 1995 Chinese drama Adventures of Sisters in Beijing (姐姐妹妹闯北京). The recommended actress left little impression, but a supporting actress "with big eyes" caught Lee's attention. Eventually Lee located that actress, Zhao Wei (Vicki Zhao), who in 1997 was a 21-year-old freshman in the Performing Institute of Beijing Film Academy. Chiung Yao was also impressed by Zhao's acting and decided to cast her in the major role of Xiaoyanzi, after reaching an agreement with her school.

Taiwanese actress Lee Ting-yi was originally chosen to portray the titular character Xiaoyanzi. However, about a week before filming was to begin, she could no longer participate due to scheduling conflicts with a film she was in. With little time remaining, the company asked if Zhao, who had the script and was asked to memorize Ziwei's lines, would portray Xiaoyanzi instead. As Lee Ching-ping recalled in 2007:

I quite nervously called her and tried to soften my words, I was thinking, how do I make her receptive and not hurt her (feelings)?... Once (I) finished, she screamed. I thought she was upset, so I asked her, "What's wrong?" She said, "(I'm) ecstatic!" As soon as she started reading the script, she fell in love with that character (Xiaoyanzi). But she had been afraid to mention it, probably embarrassed as well, (as) she was still a student.

Other reshuffling was in order. After considering 15-year-old Fan Bingbing, who was eventually cast as Jinsuo, the company settled on 21-year-old Ruby Lin, originally cast as Princess Saiya, as Ziwei. (Zhao's classmate at Beijing Film Academy, Zhang Heng, became Saiya.) Lin had just signed with Chiung Yao's company and was better known in her native Taiwan. However, after a few days of filming, sponsors claimed Lin was not attractive enough and wanted her replaced. Her return flight to Taiwan was purchased, and her replacement, Zheng Zefan or Zheng Jiaxin, another classmate of Zhao's, arrived on set. Zheng was later cast as the minor character Du Ruolan. However, Taiwanese director Sun Shu-pei predicted correctly "Ruby Lin will be very popular one day" and insisted on casting her, and Lin stayed. She said the difficult days drew her closer to Zhao, who showed her around Beijing to cheer her up.

Former boyband members Alec Su (Yongqi) and Julian Chen (Fu Ertai) of the disbanded Xiao Hu Dui (Note: The third member of Xiao Hu Dui, Nicky Wu was considered for the role of Fu Erkang, but he had to serve in the ROC military.)—neither with much acting experience—and TV star Zhang Tielin (Qianlong Emperor) were the only notable cast members. Due to budget limitations, many cast members were film school students like Zhao. Many of the older actors had limited television experience: Zhou Jie (Fu Erkang) was a stage actor with the National Theatre Company of China, while Dai Chunrong (the empress) was a qinqiang actress. (Note: Before My Fair Princess, Dai Chunrong had only acted in one TV series, The Flying Swallow of the Han Palace (漢宮飛燕), where she also portrayed an empress married to and ignored by Zhang Tielin's emperor. Zhang was her connection with the My Fair Princess producers, and the pair would later become known as "the empress specialist" and "the emperor specialist" due to their frequently appearances as those character types on Chinese television.)

== Filming ==
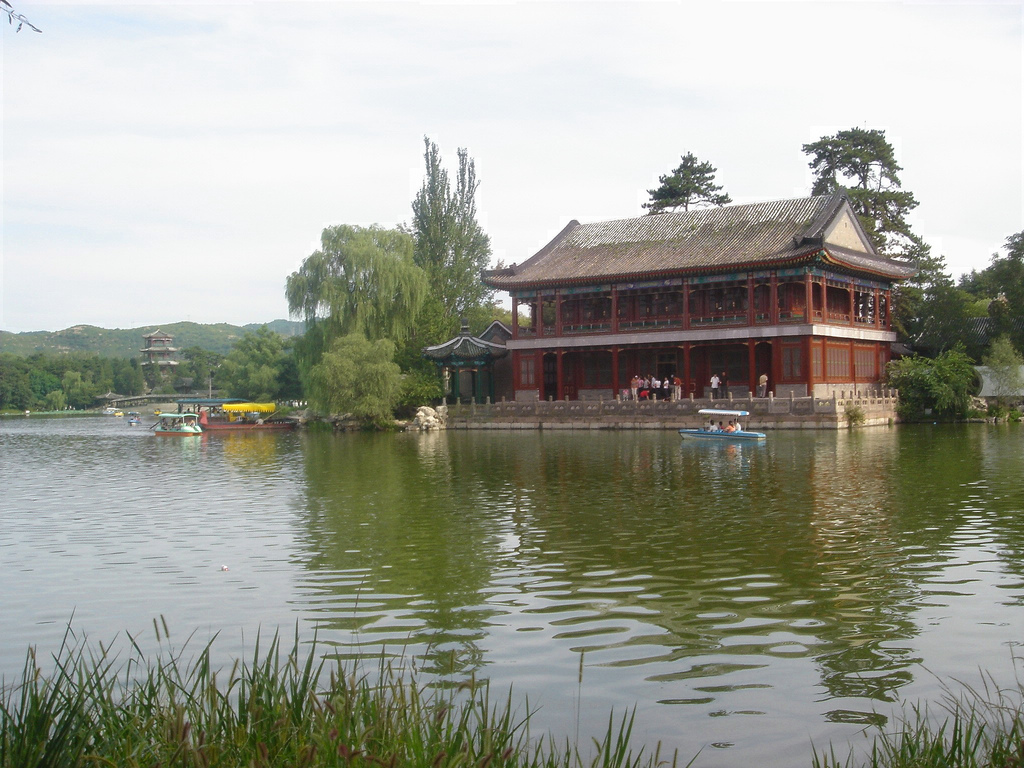
This tower in Chengde Mountain Resort, Chengde, Hebei was used as a substitute of Shufangzhai (漱芳齋). The real Shufangzhai is in the Forbidden City, Beijing, but the crew could not afford to film there.

Filming began on 18 July 1997 in Beijing. Unable to afford the cost of filming inside the Forbidden City, most scenes were shot in Chengde Mountain Resort, Chengde, Hebei as well as several locations in Beijing: Prince Gong Mansion, Beijing Grand View Garden, Miniature Garden of Old Beijing, and Beijing Film Studio. Sun Shu-pei remembered being jealous of the large-budget Yongzheng Dynasty, filming next to them in Chengde. To save cost, all jewelries used were made of plastic, and Zhao Wei developed an infection from reaction to the plastic earrings.

Not only did cast members all make less than ¥48,000 (roughly $5800 in 1997) for 5 months of filming, (Note: Season 1 had 24 episodes. Fan Bingbing, for example, made ¥1,000 per episode.) they were also subjected to extremely long working hours. According to Sun, "the actors normally got up at night to do makeups and apply costumes, and film all the way until it was too dark to see. Sometimes they could not sleep at all." Zhang Tielin estimated "two to three hours" of sleep each night and recalled Zhao and Lin stumbling downstairs in each other's arms half-asleep, tripping and sliding to the bottom of a car as they tried to enter it in frigid weather, and sleeping on a narrow bench together at the set. Zhao remembered throwing up from exhaustion. Despite frequently having to get up at 3:30 AM, none of the young actors waited until arriving at the set to start memorizing lines, according to Li Mingqi (Wet-Nurse Rong), the oldest actor:

I believe because they respected Chiung Yao a lot, they worked extremely hard. All of them being able to endure so much hardship, they really earned my admiration. I feel all of the [fame and riches] they later received, they deserved them. The hardship these kids endured when they shot My Fair Princess was indescribable with words, it was too much.

Season 2 began filming on 15 September 1998 with a much larger budget, owing to the unexpected success of Season 1. In addition to Season 1 locations, Season 2 was also filmed in Kangxi Grassland, Xiangshan Park, Workers Cultural Palace and Mei Lanfang's former residence (all in Beijing).

Unlike the "neglected" Season 1 where not a single outsider showed up to watch the filming, Season 2's filming was extensively covered by the media. Every morning, leaving the hotel was difficult for the cast members, as it was filled with fans, many from out of town. Describing the madness, Fan Bingbing wrote in 2004:

Normally 1,000 or 2,000 people would gather in front of the Beijing Film Studio to ask for our signatures. From winter to summer, there would always be huge crowds surrounding the shooting area of the set. I would hear people yell out my name, "Fan Bingbing, Fan Bingbing..." When it was time to go to the W.C., five or six staff members had to escort us.

== Plot ==
=== Season 1 (1998) ===
In the year 1759, 17-year-old (Note: In East Asian age reckoning, 18 years old is closer to 16 or 17 in the Western age reckoning.) Xia Ziwei and her maid Jinsuo travel from Jinan to the Qing Empire capital Beijing, in an effort to meet her father, the Qianlong Emperor, for the first time. Qianlong Emperor had a relationship with her mother Xia Yuhe during a trip to Daming Lake, Jinan 18 years ago, and Xia Yuhe had held the secret away from Ziwei until her recent death, before which she told Ziwei to seek her father. Unable to enter the Forbidden City, Ziwei and Jinsuo meet adventuress Xiaoyanzi, also 17, at a wedding. An orphan since a young age, Xiaoyanzi lives with siblings Liu Qing and Liu Hong in a dazayuan (residential compound). The two girls become sworn sisters, and Ziwei informs Xiaoyanzi of her mission.

Xiaoyanzi and Ziwei decide that going to the mountains during the emperor's hunting trip offers the best chance to meet him. As the climb proves too difficult for the frail Ziwei and Jinsuo, Ziwei gives Xiaoyanzi her mother's fan and painting, both gifts from the emperor, and sends Xiaoyanzi as her messenger. Xiaoyanzi successfully reaches the hunting grounds but is accidentally shot by an arrow from Prince Yongqi, Qianlong Emperor's 5th son, during the hunt. Qianlong Emperor recognizes her items and mistakes the unconscious Xiaoyanzi for his and Xia Yuhe's daughter. Once Xiaoyanzi wakes up and recovers, she is given the title "Princess Huanzhu" ("Princess Returning Pearl"), while officially declared as "adoptive" daughter of the Emperor. Attempts to reveal the truth go unsuccessfully, and she also realizes that she may be charged with deceiving the emperor — an automatic death sentence — if the truth comes out.

One day, Ziwei sees Xiaoyanzi parading the streets in a sedan chair as a princess and believes Xiaoyanzi has deceived her. She chases after the sedan chair, causing a commotion, and gets beaten by soldiers. Fu Erkang, one of the emperor's bodyguards, rescues her and learns of her story. Afterwards, Ziwei and Jinsuo begin to live at the Fu household as Erkang and Ziwei gradually begin to fall in love.

Meanwhile, Yongqi, Fu Erkang and his brother Fu Ertai sneak Xiaoyanzi out of the Forbidden City to reunite her with Ziwei, who kindly forgives her. Not wanting to risk Xiaoyanzi's life, Ziwei is willing to keep the secret and give up her claims to be princess. However, as Erkang is the son of minister Fu Lun, they cannot marry as long as she is only a commoner. The gang decide the best way to reveal the secret to the emperor is to bring Ziwei and Jinsuo into the Forbidden City as imperial maids. In the palaces, Ziwei quickly attracts the emperor's attention with her talents, intelligence, and compassion. This arouses the jealousy of the empress, who secretly has her stabbed with needles at the Palace of Earthly Tranquility. Ziwei nearly dies but is rescued by her friends. Qianlong Emperor becomes more impressed with Ziwei after this incident, and decides to take her as well as Xiaoyanzi and Yongqi on a private trip outside of Beijing, dressed as civilians.

During the trip, feelings between Xiaoyanzi and Yongqi, who is aware that she is not his sister, begin to rise. The trip is abruptly ended when a group of Dacheng Jiao sect members try to assassinate the emperor. Ziwei bravely shields the emperor from a knife before the assassins are all obliterated. Thinking herself is dying, Ziwei asks the emperor to spare the life of Xiaoyanzi, and the emperor agrees. Ziwei miraculously survives the stabbing, and the emperor shows his intention to marry Ziwei as his concubine.

Meanwhile, Princess Saiya from Tibet has arrived in Beijing. She develops a crush on Erkang, and Qianlong Emperor decides to approve their marriage. As Ziwei and Erkang are deeply in love by this point, the gang decide to finally reveal Ziwei's secret. The emperor is shocked by the possibility that the girl he wanted to marry is in fact his daughter, and particularly angry that Xiaoyanzi and Ziwei, two girls he trusts the most, have tricked him. Xiaoyanzi, Ziwei and Jinsuo are all imprisoned at the Imperial Clan Court to await interrogations.

On orders of the empress, Liang Tinggui, the man in charge of the Imperial Clan Court, tries to force the girls to sign a statement that their intentions were to murder the emperor. When they refuse, the trio are whipped harshly. Knowing that the three cannot survive long in such conditions, Yongqi, Erkang, Ertai and the Liu siblings risk their lives and break into the jail to free the girls. At the same time, Qianlong Emperor realizes how much he loves Xiaoyanzi and Ziwei and decides to release them, but is furious after discovering that they had already escaped.

After briefly on the run, the friends decide to return to the Forbidden City. Despite his original intention to behead them all, Qianlong Emperor is heartbroken to learn that the three girls were tortured in prison. He forgives all of them, beheads Liang Tinggui, and accepts both Ziwei and Xiaoyanzi as his daughters. He also orders the empress to be punished but relents after Ziwei pleads mercy on her behalf.

The last obstacle, the marriage proposal between Saiya and Erkang, is solved when Ertai courts Saiya and successfully wins her heart. The story concludes with a ceremony, during which Ziwei is proclaimed "Princess Mingzhu" ("Princess Bright Pearl"), and Qianlong Emperor announcing the engagements between Xiaoyanzi and Yongqi, Ziwei and Erkang, and Ertai and Saiya. He also officially abolishes the princess title of Xiaoyanzi, giving a lesser title "Lady Huanzhu" instead, with an alternative literally meaning "the princess who returns the pearl".

=== Season 2 (1999) ===
In the year 1760, the Uyghur leader Ali Khoja sends his daughter Hanxiang to become a concubine for the Qianlong Emperor. Hanxiang was born with a natural scent that attracts butterflies. She has long loved another man, Mengdan, with whom she unsuccessfully eloped several times.

Xiaoyanzi, Ziwei, Yongqi, and Erkang meet Mengdan at the restaurant and hotel recently opened by Liu Qing and Liu Hong. There, they learned of the love story of Mengdan and Hanxiang. Ultimately, they decide to help Hanxiang escape the Forbidden City and escape with Mengdan.

With the empress dowager returning to the palace, the empress and Wet-Nurse Rong plot against Xiaoyanzi and Ziwei, creating tension between Xiaoyanzi and Ziwei and the empress dowager by continuously pointing out the imperfections of the two girls. The empress dowager, being extremely traditional, takes an immediate disliking to Xiaoyanzi's lack of education and proper manners, while being extremely suspicious and resenting to acknowledge Ziwei's status as her granddaughter as it is unclear if she is actually Qianlong's illegitimate child. Ziwei also had a near-death experience at the torture of empress dowager after being accused of plotting to kill Qianlong after the empress had a voodoo doll planted in her bedroom. Qing'er, Qianlong's niece and a favorite companion of empress dowager, ultimately figures out the doll could not have been made by Ziwei or Xiaoyanzi. Xiaoyanzi, remaining to be referred as princess despite the change of her title, also temporarily escapes the palace where she is kept as a slave in a chess shop because she could not take the rigid rules and Yongqi repeatedly emphasizing the need to be more educated. She mistakes his good intentions as him being ashamed of her when he has all along loved her for who she is. Yongqi does this at the insistence of Qianlong as empress dowager has repeatedly threatened to end both Yongqi's and Erkang's respective engagement as she believed that Xiaoyanzi is not good enough to be Yongqi's wife and that Erkang is better paired with her favorite Qing'er, who is without doubt of royal descent. After Xiaoyanzi's return, Yongqi and the others plead to empress dowager to accept Xiaoyanzi for who she is and to not force the rigid rules on her, for, not being a real Princess, she can never meet the empress dowager's expectations. The empress dowager has no choice but to accept their engagement after Yongqi and Erkang both reveal that they would rather live as a commoner with Xiaoyanzi and Ziwei than remain as a Prince and a royal imperial guard.

Qing'er serves as a rival love interest between Erkang and Ziwei at empress dowager's insistence but despite Qing'er's actual feelings for Erkang, she does not want to get involved between Erkang and Ziwei after realizing that he would never be able to love her as well. She becomes good friends with Ziwei and ultimately helps Ziwei and Xiaoyanzi out of trouble when the empress dowager is furious at them for their various actions that does not meet in accordance with proper lady like manners.

After several attempts to resist Qianlong who was trying to force himself on her, Hanxiang accidentally cuts Emperor Qianlong's arm. When the empress dowager finds out about this, she secretly forces Hanxiang to drink poison as punishment. Xiaoyanzi, Yongqi, Ziwei, Jinsuo, and Erkang rush back but are not able to make it in time. Hanxiang is said to have died. Before she "dies", the aroma emitting from her body strengthens and tens of hundreds of butterflies fly to her side and circle the room. They leave and so does the aroma. In the end, Hanxiang is saved by the repeated attempts from Xiaoyanzi. She is ultimately saved by eating the life-saving medicine that her father gave her, in the case of an emergency. After this affair, Hanxiang loses her scent.

After Hanxiang's escape, the group lies to Qianlong that Hanxiang turned into a butterfly and flew away. As a result of Wet-Nurse Rong and the empress plotting against Xiaoyanzi and Ziwei, the birthday of Ziwei is denied by her grandaunt and granduncle, making it incompatible with the year Qianlong supposedly met Ziwei's mother. When Qianlong finds out Ziwei might not be his daughter, he sends the five to jail. Yongqi escapes after pretending that he is sick. Qianlong later sentences Xiaoyanzi and Ziwei to death. Jinsuo is sent away as a forced labor, while Erkang is imprisoned for 15 years and his titles are annulled. However, they eventually escape with help from their friends, especially Qing'er and Consort Ling. They decide to leave the Forbidden City permanently and travel to Dali. They are temporarily reunited with Mengdan and Hanxiang and witness their marital union before ultimately traveling to Dali separately. This is the last time these two characters appear in the series.

On the trip, they encounter many incidences where they lend a hand to save the weak such as stepping in to prevent the burning at the stake of a local girl who was impregnated out of wedlock and saved her life. On the road they encounter Qianlong's men who were intent on capturing them alive and to not hurt them at Qianlong's orders. Xiaoyanzi and Jinsuo are captured and taken away separately while Ziwei falls out of the carriage and temporarily loses her eyesight. Xiao Jian and Yongqi rescue Xiaoyanzi and are horrified to find a reclusive, terrified, and blind Ziwei while keeping the emotionally strained Erkang at arm's length after being afraid of becoming a permanent burden to him. At Erkang's insistence and reassurance, Ziwei finally accepts the reality that she may be permanently blind and that she can still live a fulfilling life with him by her side. The five of them travel together to the next city while leaving behind markers for Liu Qing, Liu Hong, and Jinsuo as they search for doctors able to cure Ziwei's blindness. Erkang leaves Ziwei in the care of Xiaoyanzi temporarily as he goes on to ask for directions to the next doctor, Xiaoyanzi becomes preoccupied with a game of Chess going on at a nearby table in the middle of the street and completely forgets about the blind Ziwei. As a result, Ziwei is taken by a local thug and is sold to a local brothel while a frantic Erkang and a deeply repentant Xiaoyanzi search the streets. Ziwei is ultimately found with the help of Xiao Jian's connections in the city and was able to save herself with the threat of suicide as Erkang saves her just in time. Erkang forgives Xiaoyanzi at Ziwei's insistence and they are finally reunited with Jinsuo, Liu Qing and Liu Hong. Liu Qing and Liu Hong had traveled to rescue Jinsuo and ultimately hide in a rural village where Jinsuo was to recover from her injuries. Jinsuo and Liu Qing fall in love as he takes care of her and are later married after being reunited with the group.

Throughout this time, Qianlong realizes that he truly misses the presence of Xiaoyanzi and Ziwei and he reveals to Consort Ling that him sentencing them to death was ultimately out of pure rage and that in the end, Xiaoyanzi and Ziwei would indeed ultimately be spared had Erkang and Yongqi not rescued them. The group continue to run for their life as they mistake Qianlong's men for assassins when they were really sent on the orders of the empress. Erkang and Yongqi are hurt and Ziwei miraculously recovers her sight after being terrified at Erkang's near-death experience. Qianlong is horrified as he receives reports of Erkang and Yongqi getting hurt in the subsequent fights and Ziwei's blindness and finally sends Fulun to contact them as Erkang would ultimately listen to his father and believe that Qianlong has finally forgiven them and would like their safe return.

Along the way, they discover that the mysterious guy they met at Liu Qing and Liu Hong's restaurant who has helped them throughout this whole fugitive stage, Xiao Jian, is actually Xiaoyanzi's long-lost brother after Yongqi's jealousy at his kindness to Xiaoyanzi becomes too overbearing as he mistakes it as him trying to steal Xiaoyanzi away. Xiao Jian says the birth names of himself and Xiaoyanzi are respectively "Fang Yan" and "Fang Ci". Xiaoyanzi and Yongqi had repeatedly argued throughout this time as Xiaoyanzi firmly believes that Yongqi was still hung up on being a Prince and could not accept her commoner ways while Yongqi would disagree with her actions and decisions. It is later revealed to Erkang that the reason Xiaoyanzi is an orphan is because of Qianlong. Xiaoyanzi's father was rallying against the government and later their whole family was sentenced to death as a result. In order to save Xiao Jian and Xiaoyanzi, they were sent away separately. Xiao Jian ultimately decides against revealing the truth to Xiaoyanzi and to give up the act of revenge at Erkang's insistence to preserve Xiaoyanzi's upbeat happiness, and to have Qianlong continue to love and adore her as his own daughter for she has always desired the love of a father.

After Fulun finds the group, they believe that Qianlong has forgiven them but unanimously decide to not return as their feelings towards Qianlong and the Forbidden City have changed. They desire the carefree life of commoners without the rigid rules and chaos that surrounded their life while living in the Forbidden City where Xiaoyanzi and Ziwei were particularly susceptible to punishment. In the end, the Emperor travels himself to convince them to return to the Forbidden City as he does not care if they helped Hanxiang escape, or if Ziwei is actually his daughter. There, he awards both Ziwei and Xiaoyanzi with a gold ensign Each one can excuse them from three executions. Realizing Jinsuo having been married, under the suggestion of Ziwei the emperor agrees Jinsuo not return to the palace.

Upon the return of the gang, the empress dowager ultimately forgives Ziwei and Xiaoyanzi at the insistence of Qianlong and acknowledges them as her granddaughters. Qianlong and the empress dowager later discover the empress had been plotting against Xiaoyanzi and Ziwei sending assassins to kill them along with Erkang and Yongqi disguising it as the command of Qianlong. It is also revealed that the voodoo doll was planted by the empress, and Ziwei's granduncle and grandaunt lied about the birthday of Ziwei after being bribed by the empress, thus clarifying Ziwei's identity as a princess. Qianlong is furious and commands both the empress and her maidservant, Wet-Nurse Rong, to be beheaded. However, Ziwei pulls out her gold insignia and uses up two pardons: one for Wet-Nurse Rong and one for the empress; when the emperor sentences Rong to caning instead, Ziwei again pleads for her, with Xiaoyanzi, moved, also joining Ziwei.

Because of this affair, Wet-Nurse Rong and the empress both grow appreciative of Ziwei and Xiaoyanzi. Afterwards, Xiaoyanzi and Yongqi, along with Ziwei and Erkang, are finally married; during the preparations, Xiao Jian and Qing'er first meet, and they fall in love at first sight.

== Soundtrack ==
No.	Title	Lyrics	Music	Artist	Length
1.	"當" (Dāng, "When")		Chuang Li-fan, Kuo Wen-tsung	Power Station	04:47
2.	"雨蝶" (Yǔ dié, "Rain Butterfly")		Phil Chang	Lee E-jun	03:50
3.	"今天天氣好晴朗" (Jīntiān tiānqì hǎo qínglǎng, "Today's Weather is So Sunny")		Xu Jingxin	Fang Qiong	01:53
4.	"山水迢迢" (Shānshuǐ tiáotiáo, "Distance Between Mountains and Waters")		Xu Jingxin	Fang Qiong	03:00
5.	"長相憶" (Chángxiàng yì, "Deep Longing")		Xu Jingxin	Fang Qiong	03:02
6.	"自從有了你" (Zìcóng yǒu le nǐ, "Ever Since I Had You")	Chiung Yao	Tso Hung-yuen, Lu Cheng-huang	Zhao Wei	03:26
7.	"有一個姑娘" (Yǒu yī gè gūniang, "There Is a Girl")	Chiung Yao	Lee Cheng-fan	Zhao Wei	03:33
8.	"不能和你分手" (Bùnéng hé nǐ fēnshǒu, "Can't Break Up with You")	Chiung Yao	Tso Hung-yuen, Lu Cheng-huang	Zhao Wei	04:34
9.	"我們" (Wǒmen, "Us")	Chiung Yao	Lu Cheng-huang	Zhao Wei	04:00
10.	"你是風兒我是沙" (Nǐ shì fēng er wǒ shì shā, "You're Wind, I'm Sand")	Chiung Yao	Lu Cheng-huang	Ruby Lin, Zhou Jie	04:42
11.	"夢裡" (Mèng li, "In Dreams")	Chiung Yao	Lee Cheng-fan	Ruby Lin, Zhou Jie	04:52

The first 5 tracks are from Season 1.

All lyrics were written by Chiung Yao, although Hsu Chang-te helped with the lyrics of Track 2. The lyrics for tracks 1 and 8 are the same and based on a few lines in a Han dynasty yuefu love poem, the content of which was featured prominently in Ziwei and Erkang's romance (translation by Ma Xiaodong):

山無陵	Till mountains are leveled to the ground,
江水為竭	Rivers dry up,
冬雷震震	Thunder reverberates in winter,
夏雨雪	Snow falls in summer,
天地合	The sky and the earth become one,
乃敢與君絕	Only then will I dare part with you!

Ruby Lin had also covered Track 2 in a recording.

Track 7 by Zhao Wei won bronze prize for "Outstanding Mandarin Song" at the 1999 RTHK Top 10 Gold Songs Awards. Tracks 6, 7 and 8 were also included in Zhao's debut album Swallow (1999).

Most songs were covered in Vietnamese. Yến Khoa had an entire cover album Hoàng Châu Cát Cát (2001), which includes "Tình Hồng Như Mơ" (cover of Track 8), "Khi Có Em Trong Đời" (cover of Track 6), "Em Như Nụ Hồng" (cover of Track 7), "Phiêu Du Giữa Đời" (cover of Track 9) and "Gió Cuốn Bụi Bay" (cover of Track 10). Other Vietnamese covers include Đan Trường's "Hoài Niệm Cũ" (cover of Track 1), Đan Trường & Cẩm Ly's "Tình Hồng Như Mơ" (cover of Track 11), Tú Quyên's "Trong Em Tình Vẫn Sáng" (cover of Track 2), and Hoàng Châu's "Đời Em Là Cánh Bướm" (also cover of Track 2).

== Reception ==
=== Ratings ===
Taiwan's China Television (CTV), which had a prior agreement with Chiung Yao's company, was the first channel to broadcast Season 1 from 28 April to 29 May 1998. Average ratings were high at 12.1%, with the highest rating reaching 17%, prompting CTV to rerun it immediately on 1 June, which again topped the ratings charts. Zhao Wei, who went back to study at the Beijing Film Academy, said the first sign that her life was changing was receiving "rooms upon rooms" of fan mail from Taiwan at her school dormitory. After it was later broadcast in China, Zhao received over 100,000 letters total, sometimes 1,000 in a day.) On 18 March 1999, CTV broadcast Season 1 the third time in less than a year, and again it topped the ratings at 5.6%. Season 1 brought NT$70 million to the station. The much longer Season 2 was then broadcast from 21 April to 25 June 1999 and reran immediately, stoking viewer enthusiasm in the series from March until 13 December 1999. Average ratings for Season 2 was 13.68%, the highest ratings in Taiwan since 1996. It was surpassed in 2001 by the Taiwanese-made Meteor Garden.

In China, HBS initially had problems selling its broadcasting rights. Some stations doubted it would be successful, as it was so different from typical Chiung Yao tearjerkers. When it was finally broadcast on Beijing Television (BTV) in Beijing, the average audience share was 44%. On HBS's Hunan Television (HNTV) in Hunan, it reached 54%. After it was rerun two months later, ratings were No. 1 at 26.7%. Season 2, first broadcast in June 1999 as in Taiwan, averaged more than 50% across the board, reaching as high as 65% on HNTV. Commercial returns were immense; copyrights in China were sold for ¥390,000 per episode for Season 1 and ¥545,000 per episode for Season 2. BTV earned over ¥25 million from Season 2 commercials, whereas Shanghai Television (SHTV), with average ratings of 55% in Shanghai for Season 2, made over ¥40 million. In contrast, all actors earned less than ¥2,000 per episode for Season 1. Even in the 2010s, reruns on HNTV would still finish at the top of national ratings in China of the year.

In Hong Kong, Asia Television (ATV) relied on the series to beat rival TVB in prime time for the first time, with 58% of the audience share for the Season 2 finale in 1999.

In Mongolia, ratings were so high that distributors showed the last three episodes of Season 1 in movie theaters.

In South Korea, it became an unexpected hit on the small Gyeongin Television, achieving 4% at the Seoul National Capital Area according to Nielsen Korea. Many Korean fans started to study Chinese.

The series was also popular in many Southeast Asian countries. Zhao Wei and Ruby Lin visited Ho Chi Minh City together in February 2001. They visited an SOS Children's Village and sang at the "Xuân 2001" ("Spring 2001") concert. Pursued by fans, they remained in their hotel instead of shopping.

=== Awards and nominations ===
Year	Event	Category	Recipient(s)	Result
1999	17th Golden Eagle Awards	Best Television Series	Season 1	Won
1999	17th Golden Eagle Awards	Best Actress	Zhao Wei	Won

Zhao Wei was at the time the youngest Best Actress winner in Golden Eagle Awards history.

=== Criticism ===
In China, the series was blamed for numerous accidents ranging from multiple deaths caused by overused television sets to at least six accidental deaths of Chinese children attempting to imitate Xiaoyanzi's hanging attempt. In March 1999, a girl left home alone intending to go to Zhao Wei's hometown Wuhu to meet "Xiaoyanzi". Some called for the media to report more negative news on Zhao to curb the celebrity worship syndrome epidemic. Many parents and teachers were also concerned with the character Xiaoyanzi, as the character's lack of education, discipline, and manners may be a negative example for children. In September 1999, a man sued Chiung Yao, Hunan Television, Hunan Broadcasting System, and his local Zhejiang Television for ¥80 million for mental anguish to his family due to watching the drama, calling Xiaoyanzi a "psychiatric patient" who had caused "extremely serious consequences" to children who "liked, worshipped, studied and imitated" her. He demanded an immediate halt on the show and its merchandising. Although the case was not accepted, his opinion was echoed by Chinese People's Political Consultative Conference member Wei Minglun (魏明伦), who in 2002 proposed measures to prevent "rogue" characters like Xiaoyanzi from being idolized by youth.

The show was also criticized for its inaccurate portrayal of the Qing dynasty and history. In 2000, Qianlong Emperor's 7th-generation descendant Yu Ziwei (毓紫薇) published a letter to Chiung Yao criticizing the story as irresponsible to the Aisin Gioro clan. She also stated the drama significantly disrupted her life because the character Xia Ziwei has her given name "Ziwei". Similar criticism was voiced by at least one other Aisin Gioro descendant, Puyang (溥杨).

=== International broadcast ===
Premier year refers to Season 1.

Country or Region	Network	Premiere	Title
Cambodia			ព្រះនាងយេយេ (Preah Neang Ye Ye)
China	HBS	1998	还珠格格 (Huan Zhu Ge Ge)
Hong Kong	ATV	1999	還珠格格 (Waan Jyu Gaak Gaak)
Indonesia	Indosiar	1999	Putri Huan Zhu
Japan	Sun TV	2008	還珠姫 〜プリンセスのつくりかた〜 (Kanju Hime ~Purinsesu no Tsukuri Kata~)
Macau			還珠格格 (Waan Jyu Ge Ge )
Malaysia	NTV7	1999	還珠格格 (Waan Jyu Ge Ge )
Mongolia	Channel 25 (Mongolia)	1999	Хуанжу гэг (Khuanju geg)
Philippines	QTV	2008	My Fair Princess
Singapore	VV Drama	1999	还珠格格 (Huan Zhu Ge Ge)
South Korea	Gyeongin TV	1998	황제의 딸 (Hwangje-ui Ttal; "Emperor's Daughter")
Taiwan	CTV	1998	還珠格格 (Huan Zhu Ge Ge)
Thailand	Channel 3	1999	องค์หญิงกำมะลอ (Xngkh̒ h̄ỵing kảmalx; "False Princess")
Vietnam	VTV	1999	Hoàn Châu Công Chúa / Hoàn Châu Cách Cách / Bức Tranh Định Mệnh

=== English version ===
The English version of Season 1 was dubbed at the Bang Zoom! Entertainment studio under director Wendee Lee in 2013. It is scheduled to be released by Rock Motion Picture Voice-Over Distribution Company. In the translation, Xiaoyanzi ("Swallow") became "Sparrow" while Ziwei ("Myrtle") became "Rose".

Voice actors:

- Chrissy Swinko - Sparrow (Xiaoyanzi)
- Cristina Valenzuela - Rose (Xia Ziwei)
- Christine Marie Cabanos - Goldlock (Jinsuo)
- Grant George - Yongqi
- Kira Buckland - Liu Hong

== My Fair Princess III (2003) ==
While the first two seasons featured almost the same cast, most cast members declined the offer to star in another sequel. The Season 3 script was also delayed for a year because of Chiung Yao's personal matters. When it was finally ready, almost 4 years later, Zhao, Lin and Su (who had shot another Chiung Yao series together in Romance in the Rain) were in the process of filming other projects and could not participate. Zhou Jie was the only returning main actor.

== New My Fair Princess (2011) ==
A 98-episode remake of the first series was filmed in June 2010, and aired in 2011. Akin to the previous version, the remake had three parts but more comedic elements than the original. After airing in China, both critics and audiences expressed disappointment in the casting and script.

Viewership was also much lower compared with the original. Ratings for the remake was 1.5% in China, which was average for a Hunan Television show. In Taiwan, the rating was 0.7%, not only ranking last, but also becoming the lowest rating of a Chiung Yao television series in decades.

== Other remakes ==
=== Vietnamese cải lương series ===
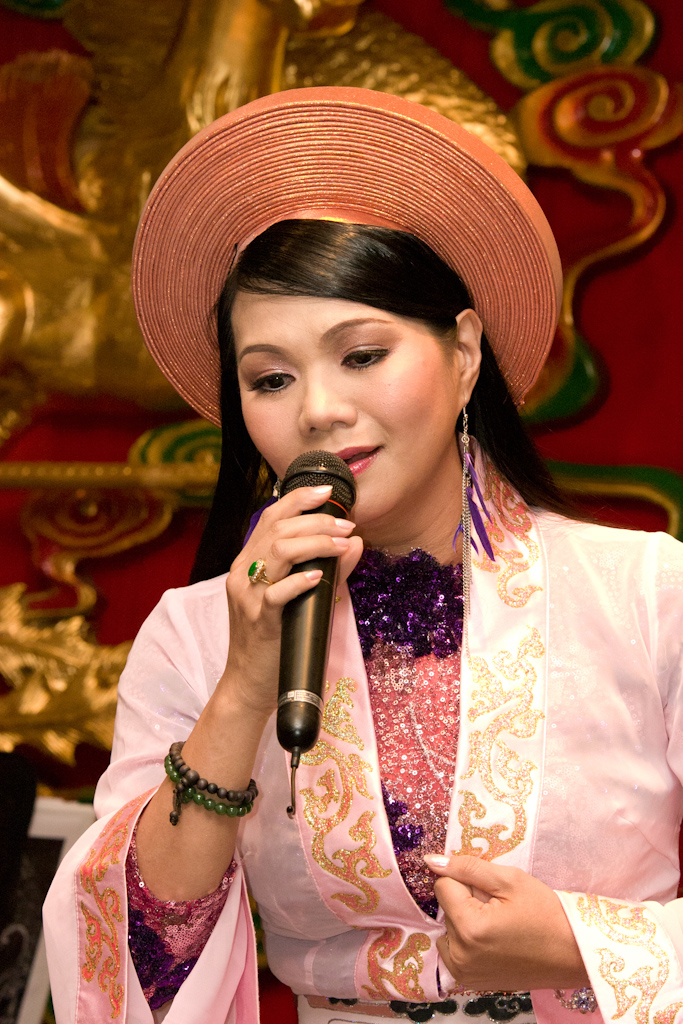
Cải lương actress Ngọc Huyền, who portrayed a character based on Xiaoyanzi.

In Vietnam, Season 1 was adapted into a 20-episode 2002 cải lương series titled Hoàng Châu Các Các, starring Phương Mai and Vũ Linh.

Cast:

- Phượng Mai as Phụng Tử Uyên (based on Xia Ziwei)
- Vũ Linh as Vĩ Lâm (based on Fu Erkang)
- Kim Tử Long as Vĩnh Kỳ (Yongqi)
- Ngọc Huyền as Tiểu Mỹ Nữ (based on Xiaoyanzi)
- Thanh Tòng as Emperor Thanh (based on Qianlong Emperor)
- Thanh Hằng as the Empress
- Hồng Nga as the wet nurse (based on Wet Nurse Rong)
- Vân Hà as Xuyên Hỉ (based on Jinsuo)
- Ngân Tuấn as Vĩ Tú (based on Fu Ertai)
- Kim Thoa as Consort Huệ (based on Consort Ling)
- Trinh Trinh as Princess Tái Á (Princess Saiya)

=== Cantonese opera ===
Season 1 was adapted into a Cantonese opera titled Waan Jyu Gaak Gaak Bei Hei Cung Fung (還珠格格悲喜重逢), with Ye Youqi portraying Xiaoyanzi (Siu-yin-ji) and Jiang Wenduan portraying Xia Ziwei (Ha Ji-mei). The VCD was released in 2004.

=== Parodies ===
Because of its popularity, exaggerated acting, and cheesy dialogue, the show was often parodied online in China. An online group named Xudu Bar (胥渡吧) became famous for videos where they dubbed scenes from the series with altered dialogue and comical voices. As a result, the wet nurse character Rong became an Internet meme. In 2014, during the 5th series of the reality competition China's Got Talent, five members of Xudu Bar dubbed their videos live before Zhao Wei, Alec Su, and other judges.

Other parodies include:

- A 2000 Hong Kong Category III film Princess Princess (還枝格格, Cantonese: 'Waan Zi Gaak Gaak) starring Jimmy Wong Shu-kei and Lily Chung, was a pornographic parody film.
- In 2007, German company Mez-Technik dubbed a clip from Season 2 in Swabian German for their ad.
- In 2013, Conan O'Brien and Andy Richter stopped by Bang Zoom! Entertainment for satirical dubbing on some scenes of Season 1, the result of which was aired on Conan.
- In January 2014, a Vietnamese parody titled Chầu Hoan Cua Chống was released on YouTube. It generated 6 million views.
- In January 2015, a 30-episode Chinese parody film series titled Princess Huanzhu 2015 (还珠格格2015) released the first episode on LeTV.com.

=== Web series (in preparation) ===
In 2021, it was announced that a 38-episode web series would be produced as a prequel to My Fair Princess, focusing on the story between Xia Yuhe and the Qianlong Emperor. However, no further developments have been made regarding the series.

== See also ==
- Gongzhufen - the place that inspired the story.
- Old House Has Joy - a 1998 TV series starring Zhao and Su.
- Romance in the Rain - a 2001 Chiung Yao-created TV series starring Zhao, Lin, Su (with Leo Ku). Wang Yan also made a cameo.
