= New My Fair Princess =

- 2011 Chinese DVD cover for Part 2
- Genre: Costume drama Comedy drama Teen drama Soap opera Wuxia; Historical fiction
- Created by: Chiung Yao
- Developed by: Li Hao
- Written by: Chiung Yao; Huang Su-yuan
- Directed by: Li Ping; Ting Yang-kuo
- Presented by: Ping Hsin-tao; Ouyang Changlin; He Zhu; Chen Tianqiao
- Starring: Li Sheng; Zhang Rui; Benjamin Schwartz; Hai Lu; Li Jiahang; Chiu Hsin-chih
- Opening theme: "Benxiang ni" (奔向你) performed by Zhang Rui
- Country of origin: China
- Original languages: Mandarin; English; Mongolian; Uyghur
- No. of episodes: 98

Production
- Executive producers: Ho Hsiu-chiung; Liu Haiyan
- Producers: Liu Xiangquan; Wei Wenbin; Zhang Huali; Hu Weijian
- Production locations: Hengdian World Studios; Hangzhou; Beijing; Yunnan; Inner Mongolia
- Production companies: Hunan Broadcasting System; Shanghai Chuangyi Media; Beijing Shining Show Media

Original release
- Network: Hunan Television
- Release: 16 July – 8 September 2011

Related
- My Fair Princess (1998–1999); My Fair Princess III (2003)

New My Fair Princess is a 2011 Chinese television drama written by Taiwanese novelist Chiung Yao (with help by her assistant Huang Su-yuan) and produced by Hunan Broadcasting System. It is a remake of the 1998–1999 smash hit My Fair Princess, and directed by the same 2 directors from My Fair Princess III (2003). Akin to the original, main cast members were almost all unestablished, although lead actresses Li Sheng and Hai Lu were already 27 and 26 years old in 2010 when it was shot. Ruby Lin from the original as well as Qin Lan and Zang Jinsheng from My Fair Princess III made guest appearances.

Despite a huge budget compared to the original, including over ¥4.5 million (roughly US$0.7 million) on costumes alone, the series received largely negative reviews after it was broadcast.

== Parts ==
The drama is composed of three parts.

- Part 1: Flying Swallow (燕兒翩翩飛): episodes 1 to 36
- Part 2: Blowing Wind (風兒陣陣吹): episodes 37 to 74
- Part 3: Wandering People (人兒何處歸): episodes 75 to 98

== Cast ==
- Li Sheng as Xiaoyanzi
- Zhang Rui as Yongqi
- Benjamin Schwartz as Banjieming (Benjamin)
- Hai Lu as Xia Ziwei
- Li Jiahang as Fu Erkang
- Chiu Hsinchih as Qianlong Emperor
- Sheren Tang as the empress
- Leanne Liu as the empress dowager
- Zanilia Zhao as Princess Qing'er
- Gao Ziqi as Xiao Jian
- Sun Yaoqi as Jinsuo
- Lu Hong as Fu Ertai
- Fang Qingzhuo as Wet-Nurse Rong
- Wang Jinduo as Liu Qing
- Zhou Fang as Liu Hong
- Liu Xiaoye as Consort Ling
- Zhuang Qingning as Consort Yu
- Madina Memet as Hanxiang
- Zhang Danfeng as Mai'erdan (Merdan)
- Chai Biyun as Princess Saiya
- Kan Qingzi as Xinrong
- Liu Changwei as Chang Shou
- Yu Yingying as Mingyue
- Ma Xiangyi as Caixia
- Qu Aohui as Xiaodengzi
- Zhang Zhuowen as Xiaozhuozi
- Lei Zhenyu as Fu Lun
- Chen Huijuan as Fu Lun's wife
- Xu Yazhou as Lang Shining
- Gang Yi as Ji Xiaolan
- Xing Hanqing as Fu Heng
- Yang Fengyu as E Min
- Xin Xin as Xiaowenzi
- Chen Muyi as Xiaochongzi
- Li Zixing as Xiaoguizi
- Han Chao as Xiaoshunzi
- Wang Zi as Xiaoluzi
- Xu Tianchen as Xiaohuangzi
- Chen Yayun as Xiaolüzi
- Ding Li as Xiaolanzi
- Xie Zhongling as Cailian
- Zang Jinsheng as Liang Tinggui
- Wang Heming as Master Zhuang
- Nige Mutu as Ali Hezhuo (Ali Khoja)
- Wang Jianxin as Qike'er
- Yang Quanjing as Sai Wei
- Ye Dao as Sai Guang
- Yan Qinglong as Sai Hu
- Yu Chengchuan as Sai Bao
- Li Xiaoyan as Wet-Nurse Gui
- Cao Shan as Shuangxi
- Zhou Jingjing as Lamei
- Zhang Xinyue as Dongxue
- Cheng Jinan as Cuihuan
- Sheng Tianling as Peiyu
- Hu Qiunan as Zhen'er
- Weng Wenqian as Cui'er
- Qian Jing as Mei'er
- Luo Shujie as Ying'er
- Yang Qing as Jixiang
- Huang Xiaolan as Ruyi
- Zheng Qiongxiao as Xiaoxiao
- Yang Mengdi as Zhaizhai
- Mou Xing as Qiutian
- Xu Yuhan as Xiaodouzi
- Kang Shengwen as Xiaohuzi
- Chen Shidan as Baby Girl Dou
- Kong Biyu as Grandma Wang
- Liu Huanying as Nanny Sun
- Chen Heng as Third Princess
- Chai Wei as Seventh Princess
- Mi Dou as Ninth Princess
- Fu Tao as Eleventh Prince
- Wu Tiezheng as Twelfth Prince
- Zhu Jiazhen as Zhu'er
- Ai Ru as Jinlingzi
- Chen Zhuo as Yinlingzi
- Yu Zikuan as Guan Bao
- Su Mei as Guan Bao's wife
- Gao Sen as Eunuch Pu
- Wang Chunyuan as Imperial Doctor Hu
- Yan Jingning as Imperial Doctor Li
- Han Xiquan as Imperial Doctor Zhong
- Chen Fusheng as Balang
- Yin Zhefei as Brother Ou
- Mao Jianping as Brother Ou's wife
- Shen Baoping as Liu Yixin
- Xu Zhenbin as Lujia
- Wang Liangzhu as Kaluma
- Li Chenyin as Langka
- Jenny Zhang as Hu Ruolan
- Wang Kun as Gao Yuan / Gao Da
- Zong Fengyan as Gao Liang / Gao Ming
- Ruby Lin as Xia Yuhe
- Gao Ziqi as Xiao Zhihang
- Qin Lan as Du Xueyin

== Reception ==
In Taiwan, where the first 2 seasons of the original series both recorded double-digit ratings, the remake only managed 0.8 in the first week, ranking last among Taiwan's major channels. Ratings eventually improved to 2.0 by the last week, tying for third place. In Mainland China, ratings mostly ranked first nationally, even though the average ratings of 1.5 and audience shares of 8.3% also hardly compared to the original's numbers (more than 50% audience shares) more than a decade ago. Reports suggest that many were only watching it to see how "terrible" it was, after initial negative reviews. With the exception of Ruby Lin who received strong support by nostalgic fans of the original, the actors were harshly criticized and ridiculed on social media. A message on Sina Weibo that was re-posted over 60,000 times read "When I watched the Old My Fair Princess then, I always hoped Xiaoyanzi and Ziwei could finish off the empress and Wet Nurse Rong; when I watch the New My Fair Princess now, I just hope the empress and Wet Nurse Rong finish off Xiaoyanzi and Ziwei as quickly as possible." A Taiwanese kuso version mocking a scene's dialogue also went viral, generating more viewers than the series, infuriating Chiung Yao. After the last episode aired in China, Chiung Yao wrote on her Sina Weibo account to the large number of disappointed critics: "My heart hurts. The distance between us is too large."

== Awards ==
2011 Huading Awards

- Won – Sheren Tang, Best Supporting Actress in a Chinese TV Series

== See also ==
- Flowers in Fog – a 2013 Chiung Yao series also starring Li Sheng and Zhang Rui
