= Empress Nara =

Empress of China from 1750 to 1766

Empress Nara 那拉皇后
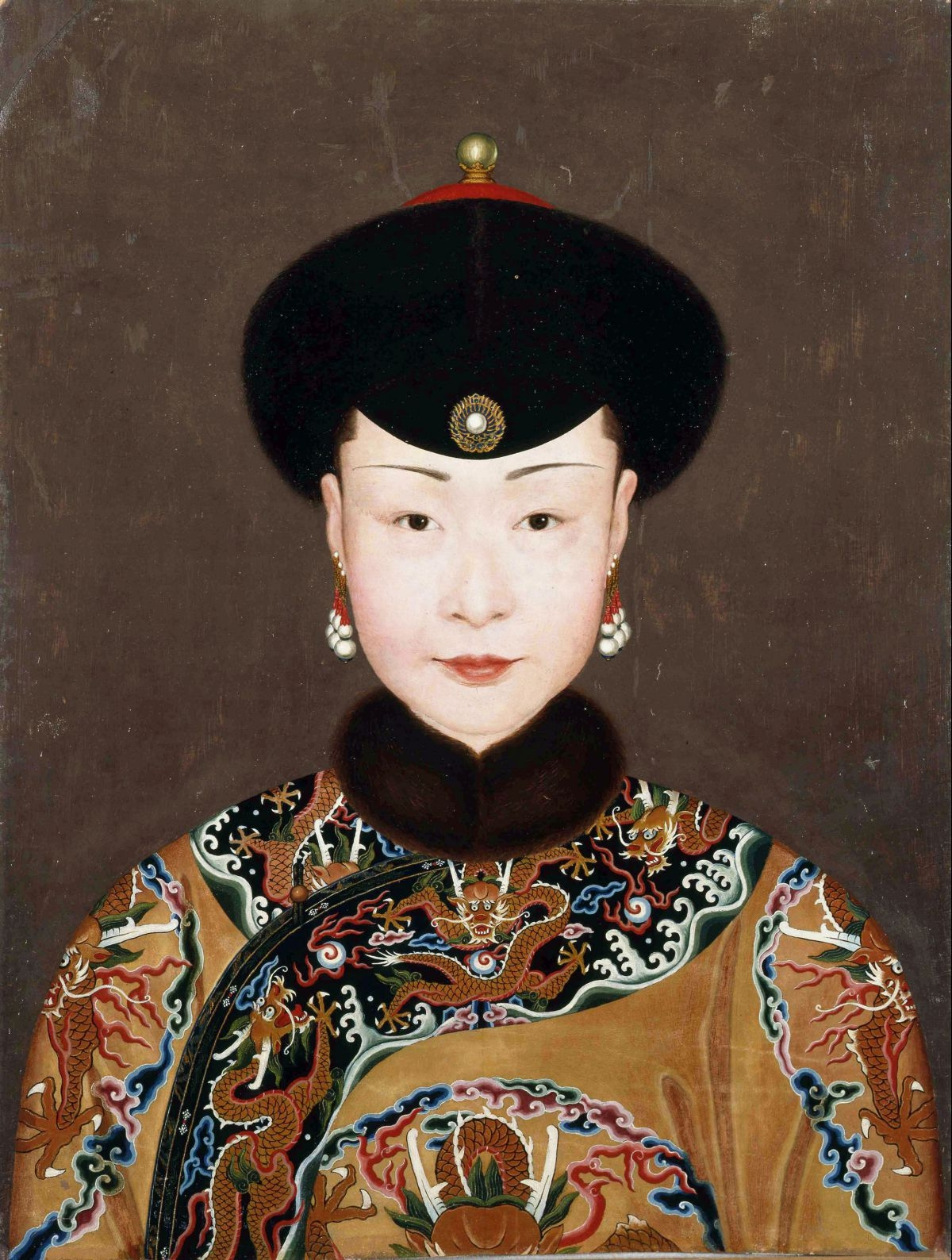
- La Concubine (1750) by the French Catholic priest Jean Denis Attiret, purported to depict Empress Nara (formerly claimed as Imperial Noble Consort Shujia)

Empress of the Qing dynasty
- Tenure: 2 September 1750 – 19 August 1766
- Predecessor: Empress Xiaoxianchun
- Successor: Empress Xiaoshurui
- Born: 11 March 1718
- Died: 19 August 1766 (aged 48); Forbidden City, Shuntian Prefecture, Zhili, Qing dynasty (in present-day Beijing)
- Burial: Yu Mausoleum, Eastern Qing tombs
- Spouse: Qianlong Emperor (m. 1734)
- Issue Detail: Yongji, Prince of the Third Rank
- House: Nara (by birth); Aisin-Gioro (by marriage)
- Father: Narbu (訥爾布)
- Mother: Lady Langgiya (郎佳氏)
- Religion: Buddhism

Empress Nara (11 March 1718 – 19 August 1766), of the Manchu Bordered Blue Banner Nara clan, was the second empress consort of the Qianlong Emperor of China's Qing dynasty. Informally known as the Step-Empress (繼皇后), she is one of the most controversial female figures in Chinese history.

She was elevated to empress rank after Empress Xiaoxianchun's death, and in her role as empress, accompanied the Qianlong Emperor on many leisure and hunting trips, as well as ancestral worship ceremonies.

Historical records give little information about her life or even her physical appearance. Because of this lack of documentation, there has been intense speculation among Chinese academicians regarding her historicity and character. It is widely suspected that the Qianlong Emperor destroyed all her records and portraits.

Although never officially deposed, she lost her authority as chief of the imperial harem in 1765, reputedly because she cut her hair, an act that was considered a grave offense according to Manchu custom. Consequently, the Qianlong Emperor ordered that her four titular imperial edicts, accompanying gifts, and imperial seal be confiscated. After her death, she was not given an imperial funeral or a posthumous name, nor was she buried with the Qianlong Emperor.

== Debate over historical maiden name ==
In the Draft History of Qing, the future Step-Empress is noted as being a member of the Ula Nara clan. However, the Draft History of Qing is noted to be riddled with errors, due to a hasty publication that precluded an editing process.

Her father is listed as Narbu, found in the Genealogy of the Manchu clans (八旗滿洲氏族通譜) as being a descendant of Wangginu (王機砮), a leader of the Hoifa Nara clan, and the family's ancestors are listed under the section "People with the surname Nara in the Hoifa area" (輝發地方納喇氏) as having lived in the Hoifa area for generations. Therefore, some modern publications have stated the Step-Empress was a member of the Hoifa Nara clan.

However, at least one author has noted that with members of the Nara clan, the name that comes before Nara merely denotes the geographical area in which the family resided in, and that all members of the clan share the same last name, regardless of their area of residence. In the Factual Record of Qing (清實錄), when the Step-Empress, at the time the secondary consort of the new Qianlong Emperor, was elevated to Consort Xian, she was referred to as being of the Nara clan, rather than as a member of the Ula Nara or Hoifa Nara.

The debate over the Step-Empress' maiden clan has manifested itself in two 2018 media portrayals of the Step-Empress's life:

- In the Story of Yanxi Palace, the character based on the Step-Empress is named Hoifa Nara Shushen.
- In Ruyi's Royal Love in the Palace, the character based on the Step-Empress is named Ula Nara Qingying/Ruyi.

== Life ==
=== Family background ===
The date of the Step-Empress' birth is a matter of debate, with the book Four Genealogies of the Qing Royal House stating that she was born some time in the second lunar month of an unknown year, and at least one modern book stating that she was born on the 10th day of the 2nd month of the 57th year of the Kangxi Emperor's reign. (Note: 11 March 1718) She was born to Narbu, a niru ejen, or assistant captain.

=== Yongzheng era ===
Hongli's father, the Yongzheng Emperor, appointed Lady Nara as his secondary consort shortly before his ascension to the throne. She was noted to have gained Hongli's favor during this time.

=== Qianlong era ===
After the death of Yongzheng in 1735, Hongli succeeded him as the Qianlong Emperor, and Lady Nara was granted to rank of consort, with the honorific title "Xian" (嫻; "elegant"), on 23 January 1738. (Note: 23 January 1738) Her pleasant character also won the favour of Qianlong's mother, Empress Dowager Chongqing, and on 9 December 1745, she was promoted to noble consort.

Qianlong's first wife, Empress Xiaoxianchun, died in 1748, but the circumstances were not well documented by historical sources. Some say she died on a boat in Dezhou, but most believe that she made it back to the Forbidden City in Beijing.

The Emperor later elevated Lady Nara to the position of imperial noble consort via an edict issued on 20 May 1749, giving her administrative powers over the harem as acting empress.

Two years later, an edict to appoint the Imperial Noble Consort as the new empress was issued on 13 August 1750. The decision was made following the end of the mourning period for Empress Xiaoxianchun. From then on, the Step-Empress accompanied Qianlong on many trips, ancestral worship ceremonies, and hunts.

Between the 17th year of Qianlong to the 20th year, (Note: A time period spanning from 15 February 1752 to 30 January 1756.) the Step-Empress gave birth to three children: the 12th prince, Yongji (永璂), an unnamed daughter, and the 13th prince, Yongjing (永璟), respectively.

=== Downfall ===
According to the Draft History of Qing, in 1765, during the 30th year of Qianlong's reign, the Step-Empress accompanied the Emperor on a tour to Southern China. As the group arrived in Hangzhou, under circumstances that remain the subject of debate, the Step-Empress cut her hair. Contemporary Qing customs held that Manchu people could cut their hair only as a sign of deep mourning. The Step-Empress' action was considered a grave offense, as it was taken as a gesture meant to curse the Emperor and the Empress Dowager. She was commanded to return to the capital; Fulong'an (福隆安), Empress Xiaoxianchun's nephew and the husband of Qianlong's fourth daughter, escorted her via the waterways.

In 2019, Chinese author Li Shu, in her book on Qing imperial cuisine, asserted to have discovered the exact moment the incident occurred, using Qing dynasty records of the portions of food the Emperor gave to his consorts. She argued that the granting of a food portion represents an act of honor and love by the Emperor to his consort, whereas withholding such a grant indicates displeasure. She postulated that the incident happened at some point following breakfast on 7 April 1765, when the Step-Empress received a portion of assorted meats, and before dinner that same day, when the she was not mentioned as having received any portion of food from the Emperor. In addition, starting from that dinner and thereafter, the Step-Empress' name was covered up with yellow paper on records of food portion grants.

After the incident and following the Step-Empress' return to the capital, she was still granted the same amount of daily food and charcoal rations as would be accorded to an empress, and she was given five eunuchs and two cooks. But on 1 July 1765, following the Qianlong Emperor's return to Beijing, he ordered that the Step-Empress' four written edicts that bestowed her ranks, as well as the accompanying gifts, be confiscated. In addition, the Step-Empress' tenfold maid workforce was reduced to two, the same number of maids that a second class attendant (答應; lowest-ranked imperial consort) was allowed to have. Furthermore, the Qianlong Emperor conferred the title of imperial noble consort on Noble Consort Ling half a month after his return to the capital. Under Qing dynasty's ranking of consorts, an imperial noble consort was only a step below the empress, meaning that while Noble Consort Ling was not explicitly granted administrative powers over the harem, the Step-Empress had definitely fallen out of favor with the Emperor.

=== Death ===
The Step-Empress died in the 7th month of the 31st year of Qianlong. (Note: A time period spanning from 6 August to 3–4 September 1766.) However, the exact date of her death is a matter of debate. The Draft History of Qing, which has accuracy and reliability concerns, states that she died on the Jiawu, (Note: 31 August 1766) while modern works typically list her death as having happened on the 14th day of the 7th month. (Note: 19 August 1766)

The Step-Empress was already seriously ill by the 6th month of that same year, (Note: A time period spanning from 7 July to 5 August 1766.) but despite her illness, Qianlong did not delay his trip to the summer residence in Chengde.

At the time of the Step-Empress' death, the Qianlong Emperor was on his annual hunting excursion at the Mulan Hunting Grounds (木蘭圍場; in present-day Weichang Manchu and Mongol Autonomous County). Instead of ending his excursion immediately to head back to the Forbidden City, he ordered his 12th son, Yongji (the Step-Empress' biological son), to return to the palace to handle the funerary affairs.

By the Qianlong Emperor's order, the Step-Empress' funeral was treated as that of an imperial noble consort, but in reality, the ceremony was a much more scaled-down affair. For example, the usual cancellation of cabinet meetings for five days was not carried out, and the requirement for princesses, nobles, and high-ranking court officials to attend the mourning sessions was waived. In addition, the coffin used for the Step-Empress was of a much lower quality. For her burial, the Step-Empress was laid to rest in the Yu Mausoleum of the Eastern Qing tombs, next to Imperial Noble Consort Chunhui, instead of being entombed beside the Emperor's future resting place.

== Titles ==
- During the reign of the Kangxi Emperor (r. 1661–1722):
  - Lady Nara (那拉氏)
- During the reign of the Yongzheng Emperor (r. 1722–1735):
  - Secondary Consort (側福晉; from 2 December 1734)
- During the reign of the Qianlong Emperor (r. 1735–1796):
  - Consort Xian (嫻妃; from 23 January 1738), fourth rank imperial consort
  - Noble Consort Xian (嫻貴妃; from 9 December 1745), third rank imperial consort
  - Imperial Noble Consort (皇貴妃; from 20 May 1749), second rank imperial consort
  - Empress (皇后; from 2 September 1750)

== Issue ==
- As empress:
  - Yongji (永璂), Prince of the Third Rank (貝勒; 7 June 1752 – 17 March 1776), the Qianlong Emperor's 12th son
  - Unnamed daughter (23 July 1753 – 1 June 1755), the Qianlong Emperor's fifth daughter
  - Yongjing (永璟; 22 January 1756 – 7 September 1757), the Qianlong Emperor's 13th son

== In popular culture ==
- Portrayed as Consort Lan by Tsui Si-fei in The Rise and Fall of Qing Dynasty (1988)
- Portrayed as the Empress by Dai Chunrong in My Fair Princess (1998)
- Portrayed by Li Yun in Qianlong Dynasty (2003)
- Portrayed by Jiang Lili in My Fair Princess III (2003)
- Portrayed by Xu Xiaodan in The Eloquent Ji Xiaolan (2004)
- Portrayed by Sheren Tang in New My Fair Princess (2011)
- Portrayed as Ula Nara Qingying by Zhang Yan in Empresses in the Palace (2011)
- Portrayed as Empress Ula Nara by Fan Bingbing in The Lady in the Portrait (2017)
- Portrayed as Hoifa Nara Shushen by Charmaine Sheh in Story of Yanxi Palace (2018)
- Portrayed as Ula Nara Qingying/Ruyi by Zhou Xun in Ruyi's Royal Love in the Palace (2018)

== See also ==
- Imperial Chinese harem system
- Royal and noble ranks of the Qing dynasty

== Notes on Chinese years ==
Many historical materials on the Step Empress utilize the ancient Chinese lunisolar calendar, coupled with the Chinese era name system. The following Gregorian calendar dates were derived, using a date converter developed by the Academia Sinica in Taiwan.

== Sources ==
- Zhang, Caitian; Wu, Changshou (1928). "列傳一" [Biography 1]. 清史稿 (The Draft History of Qing) (in Traditional Chinese). 214.
- Chung, Yik (28 August 2018). "乾隆繼后那拉氏" [Qianlong's Step Empress of the Clan Nara]. Ta Kung Pao (in Traditional Chinese). Archived from the original on 24 May 2019.
- Xu, Guangyuan (2013). You, Qihui (ed.). 大清后妃寫真 [An Accurate Description of Great Qing's Empresses and Concubines] (in Traditional Chinese). Taipei, Taiwan: Yuan-Liou Publishing Co Ltd. ISBN 978-957-32-7139-0.
- Chen, Jiexian (May 2018). Jiang, Jiawei (ed.). 以史為鑑―漫談明清史事 [Taking History as a Guide: A detailed discussion of Ming and Qing Historical Events] (in Traditional Chinese) (初版第一刷 (Early Edition, First Printing) ed.). Taipei: San Min Book. ISBN 978-957-14-6398-8.
- Lee, Lily Xiao Hong; Lau, Clara; Stefanowska, A.D. (17 July 2015). Biographical Dictionary of Chinese Women: v. 1: The Qing Period, 1644-1911. Routledge. ISBN 978-1-317-47588-0.
- Chang, Michael G (23 March 2020). A Court on Horseback: Imperial Touring & the Construction of Qing Rule, 1680–1785. BRILL. ISBN 978-1-68417-456-0.

Empress Nara Nara Clan
Chinese royalty
| Preceded by Empress Xiaoxianchun of the Fuca clan | Empress consort of China; 2 September 1750 – 19 August 1766 | Succeeded by Empress Xiaoshurui of the Hitara clan |
