= 30th Golden Rooster Awards =

2015 Chinese film awards ceremony

The 30th Golden Rooster Awards honoring best Chinese language films which presented during 2014–15. The award ceremony was held in Jilin, Jilin Province, and broadcast by CCTV Movie Channel.

== Schedule ==
Time	Event
08/11/2015	First Ballot of nominees
08/19/2015	Announced the nominees
09/18/2015	Nominee Ceremony
09/19/2015	Award Ceremony

== Winners and nominees ==
Best Film	Best Director
Wolf Totem; The Golden Era; The Taking of Tiger Mountain; Phurbu & Tenzin; Wolf Warrior	Tsui Hark－The Taking of Tiger Mountain; Ann Hui－The Golden Era; Ba Yin－Norjmaa; Fu Dongyu－Phurbu & Tenzin; Liang Ming－Flag
Best Directorial Debut	Best Low-budget Feature
Chen Jianbin－A Fool; Peng Sanyuan－Lost and Love; Xie You－Qing Se Ri Ji; Xu Ang－12 Citizens	I'm Not Wang Mao; Norjmaa; We Will Make It Right; Yan Xiang
Best Original Screenplay	Best Adapted Screenplay
Li Qiang－The Golden Era; A Lai－Phurbu & Tenzin; Qu Jiangtao－A Grandson from America; Xing Yuanping/Jia Ru－Tu Di Zhi; Zhang Ji－Dearest; Zhao Baohua－We Will Make It Right	Chen Jianbin－A Fool; Dong Zhe/Jiang Guangyu/Zhai Junjie－Yi Hao Mu Biao; Li Yujiao/Dong Zhe/Xu Ang－12 Citizens; Tsui Hark/Huang Xin/Li Yang/Wu Bing/Dong Zhe/Lin Qian－The Taking of Tiger Mountain; Zou Jingzhi－Coming Home
Best Actor	Best Actress
Zhang Hanyu－The Taking of Tiger Mountain; Andy Lau－Lost and Love; Chen Jianbin－A Fool; Sun Weimin－Yi Hao Mu Biao	Badema－Norjmaa; Lü Zhong－Red Amnesia; Tang Wei－The Golden Era; Xu Fan－When a Peking Family Meets Aupair; Zhao Wei－Dearest
Best Supporting Actor	Best Supporting Actress
Zhang Yi－Dearest; Han Tongsheng－12 Citizens; Jing Boran－Lost and Love; Wang Qianyuan－Brotherhood of Blades; Wang Zhiwen－The Golden Era; Zhang Hui－Yan Xiang	Deng Jiajia－Silent Witness; Chen Jin－A Noble Spirit; Ding Jiali－The Golden Era; Mei Ting－Blind Massage; Zhang Huiwen－Coming Home
Best Cinematography	Best Art Direction
Lost and Love－Li Pinbin; Norjmaa－Ren Jiazhen; Phurbu & Tenzin－Zeng Jian; The Taking of Tiger Mountain－Cai Chonghui	The Golden Era－Zhao Hai; The Great Hypnotist－Luo Shunfu; The Taking of Tiger Mountain－Yi Zhenzhou; Tian Jiang Chang－Zhang Fan; Wolf Totem－Quan Rongzhe
Best Music	Best Sound Recording
Ballet in the Flames of War － Lei Lei; Flag－Liu Sijun; Norjmaa－ Mori Jihu; Phurbu & Tenzin－ Hao Weiya; The Taking of Tiger Mountain－Hu Weili	Coming Home－Tao Jing; Young Detective Dee: Rise of the Sea Dragon－ Zeng Jingxiang; The Great Hypnotist－ Zhao Nan/Yang Jiang; The Taking of Tiger Mountain－Wu Jingjing; Wolf Totem－ Wang Gang
