= Bayin =

Chinese actor

- Born: August 1963 (age 63); Uxin Banner, Ordos City, Inner Mongolia, China
- Education: First National High School of Ordos City; Shanghai Theatre Academy; Beijing Film Academy
- Occupations: Actor, director
- Years active: 1985 - present
- Agent: Inner Mongolia Film Studio
- Notable work: Norjmaa; The Legend of the Condor Heroes; Laughing in the Wind; Demi-Gods and Semi-Devils
- Spouse: Badema

Chinese name
- Traditional Chinese: 巴音額日樂
- Simplified Chinese: 巴音额日乐
Transcriptions
Standard Mandarin
- Hanyu Pinyin: Bāyīn é'rìlè

Bayan (Chinese spelling as "Bayin", born August 1963) is an ethnic Mongol actor and director from Inner Mongolia. He is known for his roles in Laughing in the Wind (2001), The Legend of the Condor Heroes (2003), and Demi-Gods and Semi-Devils (2003). Sichin Hangru (2009), his first film as a director, won the Best National Theme Creation Award at the 17th Beijing College Student Film Festival, a Special Award at the Cologne Mediterranean Film Festival, and a Best Director Award by the Mongolia National Film Association. Another film of his, Norjmaa (2015), earned him a Best Small and Medium Cost Feature Award in the 30th Golden Rooster Awards, a Best Film Award at the 33rd Fajr International Film Festival, and a Best National Theme Creation Award at the 21st Beijing College Student Film Festival, and received Golden Rooster Award nomination for Best Director.

He is a National Class-A Actor and a member of the China Theatre Association.

== Biography ==
=== Early life ===
Born in Ushin Banner (Uxin in Chinese spelling), Ordos City, Inner Mongolia in August 1963 to a family of herdsmen, and he was brought up by his maternal grandmother. From 1980 to 1982 he attended the First Mongolian High School of Ordos City. He was accepted to Shanghai Theatre Academy in 1982, and after graduation in 1986, he was assigned to the Inner Mongolia Minzu Theatre. In 1998, he studied directing at the Director Department of Beijing Film Academy as a part-time student.

=== Career ===
Bayan had his first experience in front of the camera in 1985 when he was a college student, and he was chosen to act as Jebe in the historical film Genghis Khan.

He landed some small appearances in several films, such as The Mongolian Captive (1987), Four Horsemen (1990), Rovers in West (1992), Rescue the Hostage (1993), and The Special Prisoner (1995).

In 1994, he had a cameo appearance as Ying Bu in the historical television series Hegemon-King of Western Chu.

In 1995, for his role as Che Ling in The Sorrow of Brook Steppe, he won the Best Collective Performance Award at the 16th Golden Rooster Awards.

He had a supporting role in the historical television series Romance of the Sui and Tang Dynasties (1996). Also in 1996, he participated in Empire Wu of Han as Jiang Chong, a villain in Han dynasty.

In 2001, he had a key supporting role as Xiang Wentian in the wuxia television series Laughing in the Wind, based on Hong Kong novelist Jin Yong's novel, opposite Li Yapeng and Xu Qing.

In 2002, he was transferred to Inner Mongolia Film Studio as an actor.

In 2003, he appeared in Demi-Gods and Semi-Devils as Jiu Mozhi, a wuxia television series adaptation based on the novel of the same name by Jin Yong. That same year, he played a role in another adaptation of Jin Yong's novel, The Legend of the Condor Heroes.

He starred in the historical television series Emperor Wu the Great of the Han Dynasty (2005), alongside Chen Baoguo, Gua Ah-leh, and Tao Hong.

He co-starred as Genghis Khan with Hu He and Ariel Lin in the 2006 wuxia television series The Legend of the Condor Heroes (2006), based on the novel by the same name by Jin Yong.

In 2007, he appeared in Paladins in Troubled Times, based on Liang Yusheng's novel.

He rose to fame after portraying King-in-law with gold wheel in Lee Kwok-lap's The Return of the Condor Heroes (2008), opposite Huang Xiaoming and Liu Yifei.

In 2009, he won accolades for his directorial feature film debut, Sichin Hangru. He won a Best National Theme Creation Award at the 17th Beijing College Student Film Festival, a Special Award at the Cologne Mediterranean Film Festival, and a Best Director Award by the Mongolia National Film Association.

For his role in Beyond the Sacred Land (2011), he was nominated for the Best Supporting Actor Award at the 28th Golden Rooster Awards.

He was the director of the feature film Norjmaa (2014), which earned him a Best Small and Medium Cost Feature Award in the 30th Golden Rooster Awards, a Best Film Award at the 33rd Fajr International Film Festival, and a Best National Theme Creation Award at the 21st Beijing College Student Film Festival, and received Golden Rooster Award nomination for Best Director.

== Personal life ==
Bayan married Badmaa (Badema in Chinese spelling), who is also a noted actress and singer.

== Filmography ==
=== Film ===
| Year | Title | Chinese title | Role | Notes |
|---|---|---|---|---|
| 1985 | Genghis Khan | 《成吉思汗》 | Jebe | |
| 1987 | The Mongolian Captive | 《北方囚徒》 | Edon | |
| 1990 | Four Horsemen | 《骑士风云》 | Asier | |
| 1992 | Rovers in West | 《西部狂野》 | Zuo Hao | |
| 1993 | Rescue the Hostage | 《龙虎群英》 | Zahi | |
| 1995 | The Special Prisoner | 《特殊囚犯》 | Chao Lu | |
| 1995 | The Sorrow of Brook Steppe | 《悲情布鲁克》 | Che Ling | |
| 1997 | The Golden Prairie | 《金色的草原》 | Wu Ning | |
| 1999 | The Last Hunter | 《最后一个猎人》 | A journalist | |
| 2001 | Bai Ling Hun | 《白灵魂》 | Nassim | |
| 2001 | The Story of the Village | 《牧村故事》 | Ba Tu | |
| 2002 | | 《猎豹》 | The captain | |
| 2002 | The Wind in Populus | 《风中的胡杨》 | Suira | |
| 2004 | Wolves Attack | 《狼袭草原》 | Wu Rigen | |
| 2006 | Red Manchuria | 《红色满洲里》 | A military officer | |
| 2006 | | 《温柔的草地》 | Dong Ribu | |
| 2006 | The Deer Valley | 《鹿儿谷》 | Du Wasa | |
| 2006 | Love in Ordos City | 《爱在鄂尔多斯》 | Qing Gele | |
| 2006 | Mongolia | 《大漠英雄》 | A businessman | |
| 2008 | Last Princess of Royal Blood: Tsetsenhangru | | Director | |
| 2009 | Siqin Hangru | 《斯琴杭茹》 | Director | |
| 2011 | Father's Grassland and Mother's River | 《父亲的草原母亲的河》 | Ha Tu | |
| 2011 | Beyond the Sacred Land | 《圣地额济纳》 | | |
| 2014 | Norjmaa | 《诺日吉玛》 | Director | |
| 2018 | Genghis Khan | 《战神纪》 | | |

=== Television ===
| Year | Title | Chinese title | Role | Notes |
|---|---|---|---|---|
| 1987 | Duguilong | 《独贵龙》 | Jiri Gala | |
| 1988 | Gada Meilin | 《嘎达梅林》 | Brigadier Cui | |
| 1988 | | 《春花秋月》 | Tian Liang | |
| 1988 | | 《瀚海风云路》 | Ha Tu | |
| 1989 | Amulet | 《护身符》 | You Ji | |
| 1990 | Tibetans Fly Horse | 《藏民飞骑》 | Luo Qu | |
| 1990 | | 《青春地平线》 | Ge Ziqiang | |
| 1990 | | 《黑石恋》 | Da Bao | |
| 1992 | The Female Dunner | 《讨债小姐》 | Bu He | |
| 1993 | Ulav | 《乌兰夫》 | Bala Jul | |
| 1993 | Prince of Alashan | 《阿拉善亲王》 | Shun Har | |
| 1994 | Hegemon-King of Western Chu | 《西楚霸王》 | Ying Bu | |
| 1994 | | 《强音》 | Chu Zhentang | |
| 1995 | | 《透明人生》 | He Ci | |
| 1995 | | 《守海人》 | Lai Xi | |
| 1996 | Romance of the Sui and Tang Dynasties | 《隋唐演义》 | Wu Yunzhao | |
| 1996 | Empire Wu of Han | 《汉武帝》 | Jiang Chong | |
| 1996 | Ying Qin Team | 《迎亲马队》 | Su De | |
| 1997 | Chinese Football Fans | 《中国球迷》 | Luo Xi | |
| 1998 | | 《咱们工人就是好》 | Fu Lai | |
| 2000 | Adventure Island | 《冒险岛》 | A thin person | |
| 2001 | The Sunrise | 《日出》 | Hei Shan | |
| 2001 | Laughing in the Wind | 《笑傲江湖》 | Xiang Wentian | |
| 2002 | Alone the Bodyguard | 《独行侍卫》 | Xiezi | |
| 2003 | Demi-Gods and Semi-Devils | 《天龙八部》 | Jiu Mozhi | |
| 2003 | My Ordos City | 《我的鄂尔多斯》 | Yoshida Osa | |
| 2003 | The Legend of the Condor Heroes | 《射雕英雄传》 | Jebe | |
| 2003 | Ferghana Horse | 《汗血宝马》 | Jin Daizi | |
| 2005 | Emperor Wu the Great of the Han Dynasty | 《汉武大帝》 | Junchen San-yu | |
| 2005 | I Come from the Grassland | 《我从草原来》 | Mo Fu | |
| 2006 | The Young Warriors of Yang Family | 《少年杨家将》 | Tian Ling | |
| 2006 | The Legend of the Condor Heroes | 《射雕英雄传》 | Genghis Khan | |
| 2007 | Legend of Li Sen | 《李森传奇》 | Li Sen | |
| 2007 | Paladins in Troubled Times | 《大唐游侠传》 | Yang Mulao | |
| 2008 | The Return of the Condor Heroes | 《神雕侠侣》 | King-in-law with gold wheel | |

== Drama ==
| Year | Title | Chinese title | Role | Notes |
|---|---|---|---|---|
| 1983 | Here Dad comes | 《爸爸来了》 | Father | |
| 1990 | The Snag | 《钉子》 | The nearsighted man | |
| 1991 | White Mongolia Robe | 《洁白的蒙古袍》 | Ha Da | |
| 1991 | A Table | 《一桌酒席》 | The beggar | |
| 1991 | Love in the Grassland | 《草原恋》 | Bayard | |
| 1991 | | 《银碗与眼睛》 | The Youth | |
| 1991 | Journey of Life | 《人生旅途》 | The weak | |
| 1997 | Do You Love Me? | 《爱不爱我？》 | An Actor | |
| 1998 | | 《找王班长》 | Monitor Wang | |

== Awards ==
| Year | Work | Award | Category | Result | Notes |
|---|---|---|---|---|---|
| 1995 | The Sorrow of Brook Steppe | 16th Golden Rooster Awards | Best Collective Performance Award | Won | |
| 2009 | Siqin Hangru | 17th Beijing College Student Film Festival | Best National Theme Creation Award | Won | |
| 2009 | Siqin Hangru | Cologne Mediterranean Film Festival | Special Award | Won | |
| 2009 | Siqin Hangru | Mongolia National Film Association | Best Director Award | Won | |
| 2011 | Beyond the Sacred Land | 28th Golden Rooster Awards | Best Supporting Actor Award | Nominated | |
| 2015 | Norjmaa | 30th Golden Rooster Awards | Best Small and Medium Cost Feature Award | Won | |
| 2015 | Norjmaa | 30th Golden Rooster Awards | Best Director | Nominated | |
| 2015 | Norjmaa | 33rd Fajr International Film Festival | Best Film Award | Won | |
| 2015 | Norjmaa | 21st Beijing College Student Film Festival | Best National Theme Creation Award | Won | |
