= China Movie Channel Media Awards =

Chinese film award

China Movie Channel Media Awards (电影频道传媒大奖) are presented at each Shanghai International Film Festival by China Movie Channel. Voted by the reporters in the entertainment industry, the awards are aimed at "promoting medium-and-small-budget homegrown movies and exposing talented young directors and actors".

The individual categories were "Most Attractive Director" (最受关注导演), "Most Attractive Actor" (最受关注男演员) and "Most Attractive Actress" (最受关注女演员) during 2007–2010. From 2011, the categories were altered to "Best Director" (最佳导演), "Best Actor" (最佳男主角) and "Best Actress" (最佳女主角). In 2016, they changed the individual categories back to pre-2011 again.

== Award categories and winners ==
Year	Best Film	Best Director	Best Screenwriter	Best New Director	Best Actor	Best Actress	Best Supporting Actor	Best Supporting Actress	Best New Actor	Best New Actress
2007; 4th	The Longest Night in Shanghai	Tian Zhuangzhuang for The Go Master			Winston Chao for Road to Dawn	Zhao Wei for The Longest Night in Shanghai				Wu Yue for Road to Dawn
2008; 5th	Old Fish	Gao Qunshu for Old Fish	Zhu Kexin for Ultimate Rescue	Pan Anzi for Volunteers	Ma Guowei for Old Fish	Joan Chen for Seventeen			Li Chen for Ultimate Rescue	Wang Jia for Their Noah's Ark
2009; 6th	A Tale of Two Donkeys	Christina Yao for Empire of Silver	Yang Qing for One Night in Supermarket	Li Dawei for A Tale of Two Donkeys	Xu Zheng for One Night in Supermarket	Yue Hong for A Tale of Two Donkeys			Wen Zhang for A Tale of Two Donkeys	Zhu Zhi-ying for Finding Shangri-la
2010; 7th	Ocean Heaven	Zhang Jiarui for Distant Thunder	Xie Xiaodong for Vegetate	Xue Xiaolu for Ocean Heaven	Wen Zhang for Ocean Heaven	Lü Liping for City Monkey	Ip Chun for The Legend Is Born: Ip Man	Zhang Bin for City Monkey	Guo Haoran for Distant Thunder	Na Zhenye for Deep in the Clouds
2011; 8th	The Piano in a Factory	Zhang Meng for The Piano in a Factory	Jiang Tao for One Wrong Step	Han Jie for Mr. Tree	Wang Qianyuan for The Piano in a Factory	Qin Hailu for The Piano in a Factory	Feng Guoqing for Folk Songs Singing			Lü Xingchen for Folk Songs Singing
2012; 9th	The Sino-Japanese War at Sea 1894	Lin Lisheng for Million Dollar Crocodile	Daniel Hsia for Shanghai Calling	Han Yan for First Time	Wu Ma for The Painter	Fang Qingzhuo for Only Walk	Sun Haiying for The Sino-Japanese War at Sea 1894	Jiang Shan for First Time	Daniel Henney for Shanghai Calling	Chen Xuzhu for Camel Caravan
2013; 10th	Tiny Times (tied); Young Style (tied)	Fang Gangliang for My Running Shadow	Liu Yang, Gong Kaibo for Hu Qiaoying Go to Law	Guo Jingming for Tiny Times	Dong Zijian for Young Style	Shen Aojun for Hu Qiaoying Go to Law	Liu Xiaoye for A Young Girl's Destiny	Liang Jing for All Apologies	Han Pengyi for A Young Girl's Destiny	Yang Shuting for All Apologies
2014; 11th	Phurbu & Tenzin	Fu Dongyu for Phurbu & Tenzin	Alai for Phurbu & Tenzin	Chopstick Brothers for Old Boys: The Way of the Dragon	Li Baotian for The Nightingale	Tao Hong for Forgetting to Know You	Wang Ziyi for Forgetting to Know You	Sonam Dolgar for Phurbu & Tenzin	Lawang Lop for Phurbu & Tenzin	Yang Xue for Phurbu & Tenzin
2015; 12th	12 Citizens	Xu Ang for 12 Citizens	Han Jinglong, Li Yujiao & Xu Ang for 12 Citizens	Dong Chengpeng for Jian Bing Man	He Bing for 12 Citizens	Yang Zishan for 20 Once Again	Han Tongsheng for 12 Citizens	Chen Jin for Nezha	Dong Chengpeng for Jian Bing Man	Li Haofei for Nezha
2016; 13th	The Song of Cotton	Larry Yang for Mountain Cry		Zhu Yuancheng for The Song of Cotton	Wallace Chung for Three	Yan Bingyan for The Song of Cotton	Tengger for For a Few Bullets	Ai Liya for The Song of Cotton	Austin Lin for At Cafe 6	Cherry Ngan for At Cafe 6
2017; 14th	Our Shining Days	Xu Bing for Strangers	Bao Jingjing for Our Shining Days	Wang Ran for Our Shining Days	Liu Peiqi for The War of Loong	Rayza Alimjan for Strangers	Zhang Chao for Mr. No Problem	Liu Yongxi for Our Shining Days	Stephon Marbury for My Other Home	Xu Lu for Our Shining Days
2018; 15th	Enter the Forbidden City	Hu Mei for Enter the Forbidden City	Zou Jingzhi for Enter the Forbidden City; Li Ruijun for Walking Past the Future	Su Lun for How Long Will I Love U	Fu Dalong for Enter the Forbidden City	Tong Liya for How Long Will I Love U	Zhao Yi for The Faithful	Ma Yili for Goddesses in the Flames of War	Yin Fang for Walking Past the Future	Wang Ting for Walking Past the Future
2019 16th	Crossing The Border-ZhaoGuan	Meng Huo for Crossing The Border-ZhaoGuan	Liu Hua for Driving For You All Night	Tu Men for Hulun Buir City	Yue Yunpeng for Coward Hero	Jiang Hongbo for Yellow Rose	Liu Jinshan for Driving For You All Night	Li Jingjing for Driving For You All Night	Song Weilong for Love The Way You Are	Dinaz Nursayiti for The Composer
2020 17th	Dwelling in the Fuchun Mountains	Pema Tseden for Balloon	Pema Tseden for Balloon	Gu Xiaogang for Dwelling in the Fuchun Mountains	Dunzhu Renqing for My Himalayas	Zhang Zifeng for Farewell, My Lad	Liu Yajin for 重整河山待后生	Tang Xiawa for 重整河山待后生	Zhang Youhao for Farewell, My Lad	Deng Enxi for Summer is the Coldest Season
2021 18th	The Sacrifice	Guan Hu, Frant Gwa, Lu Yang for The Sacrifice	Tian Bo for Liu Qing	Jia Ling for Hi, Mom	Zhang Yi for The Sacrifice	Zhang Xiaofei for Hi, Mom	Gao Yalin for A Little Red Flower	Zhu Yuanyuan for A Little Red Flower	Li Yunrui for Never Stop	Liu Haocun for A Little Red Flower
2022 19th	My Country, My Parents	Wen Muye for Nice View	Lan Xiaolong, Huang Jianxin for The Battle at Lake Changjin	Zhang Ziyi for My Country, My Parents	Zhang Songwen for 革命者	Yuan Quan for Chinese Doctors	Jinba for Kong and Jigme	Qi Xi for Nice View	Chen Yongsheng for Sniper	Ren Sinuo for My Country, My Parents
2023 20th	The Wandering Earth 2	Zhang Chiyu for Moon Man	Chen Yu for Full River Red	Liu Xiaoshi for Born To Fly	Wang Yibo for Born To Fly & Hidden Blade	Badema for The Cord of Life	Ning Li for The Wandering Earth 2	Zhao Ziqi for Born To Fly	Yu Shi for Born To Fly	Wang Jiayi for Full River Red
