= Xiangshan Global Studios =

Chinese film and television studio

Xiangshan Global Studios (simplified Chinese: 象山影视城; traditional Chinese: 象山影視城; pinyin: Xiàngshān Yǐngshìchéng) is a film and television studio in Xinqiao Town of Xiangshan County, Zhejiang, China. The 784,000-square-metre (194-acre) studio was established in 2003 and opened to the public in 2005. It was rated an AAAA-level tourist site by the China National Tourism Administration on November 7, 2012.

== History ==
In May 2003, to shoot the wuxia television series The Return of the Condor Heroes, Zhang Jizhong invested in the construction of the Condor Heroes Town.

In 2009, the Town of Spring-autumn and Warring States Period was added to the area.

In June 2012, the Town of Republic of China was carried out.

In 2017, the Town of Tang dynasty was completed.

== Notable films and TV series ==
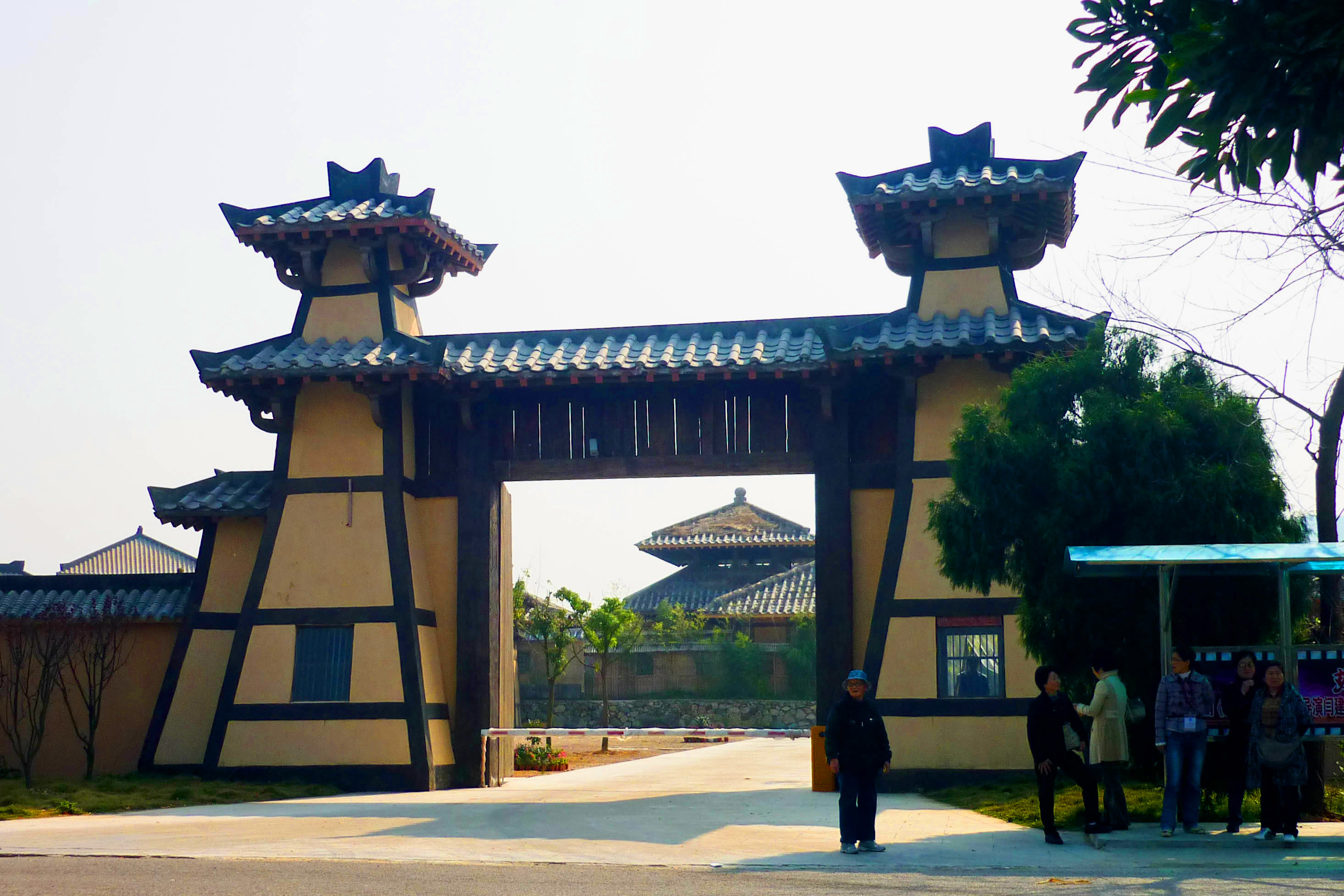
Xiangshan Film and Television Town.

Films and TV series made at the studio include:

=== Film ===
Title	Chinese Title	Notes
Sacrifice	赵氏孤儿	
The Last Supper	王的盛宴	
The Four	四大名捕	
Zhong Kui: Snow Girl and the Dark Crystal	钟馗伏魔：雪妖魔灵	
The Warriors Gate	勇士之门	
Air Strike	大轰炸	
CJ7	长江7号	
Panda Heroes	熊猫大侠	
The Lion Roars 2	河东狮吼II	

=== Television ===
Title	Chinese Title	Notes
Nirvana in Fire	琅琊榜	
Eternal Love	三生三世十里桃花	
The Legend of Mi Yue	芈月传	
The Return of the Condor Heroes	神雕侠侣	
Go Princess Go	太子妃升职记	
Chinese Paladin 3	仙剑奇侠传三	
Sound of the Desert	风中奇缘	
Xuan-Yuan Sword: Scar of Sky	轩辕剑之天之痕	
Prince of Lan Ling	兰陵王	
Singing All Along	秀丽江山之长歌行	
Ming dynasty in 1566	大明王朝1566嘉靖与海瑞	
The Legend of the Condor Heroes	射雕英雄传	
The Demi-Gods and Semi-Devils	天龙八部	
Ghost Dragon of Cold Mountain	寒山潜龙	
Journey to the West	西游记	
The Young Warriors	少年杨家将	
The Bride with White Hair	新白发魔女传	
The Legend of Qin	秦时明月	
