= Zhou Jie =

Chinese actor and singer

- 周杰
- Born: August 5, 1970 (age 54); Xi'an, Shaanxi, China
- Education: Shanghai Theatre Academy (BFA)
- Occupation(s): Actor, singer
- Years active: 1992–present
- Television: My Fair Princess; Young Justice Bao; The Legend of the Condor Heroes

Zhou Jie (Chinese: 周杰; pinyin: Zhōu Jié; born 5 August 1970) is a Chinese actor and singer, best known for his works on two television series as Fu Erkang in the My Fair Princess trilogy and as Yang Kang in The Legend of the Condor Heroes (2003).

== Early life and education ==
Zhou was born in Xi'an, Shaanxi, on 5 August 1970, while his ancestral home in Shandong. After graduating from Shanghai Theatre Academy in 1993, he was despatched to the National Theatre Company of China.

== Acting career ==
Zhou made his film debut in Stanley Kwan's biographical film Center Stage, playing Liu Qiong.

In 1998, he was cast in the role for which he is best known, the character of Fuk'anggan on the television My Fair Princess, adapted from Taiwanese novelist Chiung Yao's novel Princess Pearl. He reprised his role in My Fair Princess 2 (1999) and My Fair Princess 3 (2003).

Zhou portrayed Bao Zheng in Hu Mingkai's historical television series Young Justice Bao (2000), opposite Ashton Chen, Ren Quan, and Li Bingbing.

In 2003, he co-starred with Li Yapeng, Zhou Xun and Jiang Qinqin in the wuxia television series The Legend of the Condor Heroes, based on the novel by the same name by Hong Kong novelist Jin Yong.

Zhou played Wong Tai Sin, the lead role in Trail of the Everlasting Hero, a wuxia-fantasy television series adaptation based on Ge Hong's Biographies of the Deities and Immortals.

In 2006, he starred as King Wu of Zhou in the television series adaption of Xu Zhonglin's book, Investiture of the Gods.

In 2019, he had a small role in Old Herbalist Doctor, which starred Chen Baoguo, Feng Yuanzheng, Xu Qing, and Chen Yuemo.

== Filmography ==
=== Film ===
Year	English title	Chinese title	Role	Notes
1991	Center Stage	阮玲玉	Liu Qiong	
1995	Sino Russian International Train Robbery	中俄列车大劫案	Li Qiang	
1996	The Battle of Xiang'ge Temple	截杀香阁寺	Guan Lixiong	
1999	Are You Lonesome Tonight	相约2000年	Xiao Kang	
1999	The Shadow in the Rose Building	玫瑰楼迷影	Wu Jian	
2007	3 City Hotshots	第三种温暖	Guo Ning	
2011	The Founding of a Party	建党伟业	Li Hanjun	
2015	The Dangerous Affair	零点杀机	Chen Yongqiang	

=== Television ===
Year	English title	Chinese title	Role	Notes
1992	Eternal Youth	青春永恒	A young worker	
1993	The Strange Coast	陌生的海岸	Yue Jindong	
1998	Women at Home	女人在家	Liu Wancai	
1998	My Fair Princess	还珠格格	Fu Erkang	
1999	My Fair Princess 2	还珠格格2	Fu Erkang	
2000	Young Justice Bao	少年包青天	Bao Zheng	
2001	Legend of Peach Blossom Fan	桃花扇传奇	Jou Chaozong	
2003	The Legend of the Condor Heroes	射雕英雄传	Yang Kang	
2003	Speak Out Your Love	说出你的爱	Zhang Bao	
2003	My Fair Princess 3	还珠格格3	Fuk'anggan	
2003	Alternative Ways	非常道	Lei Ming	
2004		正义令天下	Zhuo Zhongyue	
2004	Heroes in Guandong	关东英雄	Meng Delong	
2004	Trail of the Everlasting Hero	侠影仙踪	Huang Chuping	
2005	Ultimate Mystery	终极玄机	Chen Mingyu	
2005	Plum Archives	梅花档案	Long Fei	
2006	The Legend and the Hero	封神榜之凤鸣岐山	King Wu of Zhou	
2006	Transparent Sky	透明天空	Li Mofan	
2007	Under Curtain of Night Harbin	夜幕下的哈尔滨	A Japanese	
2007	The Sun Shines Over the Earth	阳光普照大地	Zou Dike	
2008	Secret Train	秘密列车	Long Fei	
2009	South Park The Succubus	大女当嫁	Peng Tan	
2010	The Four Brothers of Peking	新京城四少	Gu Renjie	
2012	Hand in Hand Like Brother and Sister	像兄妹一样手拉手	Liu Fang	
2012	Night Angel	黑夜天使	Xie Changfeng	
2019	Old Herbalist Doctor	老中医	Mr. Jia	
