= 21st Golden Eagle Awards =

Chinese TV awards ceremony in 2003

The 21st Golden Eagle Awards were held September 15, 2003, in Changsha, Hunan province. Nominees and winners are listed below, winners are in bold.

== Television series ==
=== Best Television Series ===
- **The Field of Hop/希望的田野**
- Secretary of a Provincial Committee of the CPC/省委书记
- DA Division/DA师
- Miracle Doctor Xi Laile/神医喜来乐
- Red Poppies/尘埃落定
- Missile Brigadier/导弹旅长
- Liu Laogen Part II/刘老根（第二部）
- The Story of Cooking Class/炊事班的故事
- The Secret History of Xiaozhuang Queen/孝庄秘史
- Big-feet Queen/大脚马皇后

=== Best Mini-series ===
- **The Last Caravan of Army/军中最后一个马帮**
- Green Kunlun/绿色昆仑
- Starlight in Summer/夏日星光
- Gold Carp/金鲤鱼
- The Mountain Village Story/山村故事

=== Best Directing in a Television Series ===
- **Zhang Shaolin for The Last Caravan of Army**

=== Best Writing in a Television Series ===
- **Wang Chaozhu for Zhang Xueliang**

=== Audience's Choice for Actor ===
- Li Baotian for Miracle Doctor Xi Laile
- Wei Zi for DA Division
- Chen Baoguo for Emperor Hanwu
- Gao Ming for Quiet Promise
- Tang Guoqiang for Blood in the Snow

=== Audience's Choice for Actress ===
- Fan Zhibo for The Female Leader of Tank Squadrons
- Song Jia for Red Poppies
- Lü Liping for Big-feet Queen
- Mei Ting for Re-start Love
- Xie Lan for Blood in the Snow
- Wang Haiyan for Quiet Promise

=== Best Art Direction in a Television Series ===
- **Geng Wei/Ren Zhiwen/Guo Jian for Paradise Lost**

=== Best Cinematography in a Television Series ===
- **Gao Ziyi for Pass L.A.**

=== Best Lighting in a Television Series ===
- **Luo Xiaping for Special Citizen**

=== Best Sound Recording in a Television Series ===
- **He Ping/Du Xiaohua for DA Division**

=== Most Popular Actor ===
- **Li Baotian for Miracle Doctor Xi Laile**

=== Most Popular Actress ===
- **Song Jia for Red Poppies**

== Literature & Art Program ==
=== Best Literature and Art Program ===
not awarded this year

- 2003 CCTV New Year's Gala/2003年中央电视台春节联欢晚会
- 相聚2003—<同一首歌>三周年庆典歌会
- 第二届CCTV全国电视相声大赛颁奖晚会
- The 3rd Golden Eagle Art Festival-TV New Performer Selection第san届中国金鹰电视艺术节电视新秀大赛总决赛晚会
- 第十届全国青年歌手电视大奖赛
- 颂歌献给党－广东省喜迎"十六大"大型歌会
- 我们成功啦－上海市庆祝申博成功大型联欢活动
- 2003年春节外国人中华才艺大赛
- 龙腾虎跃梨园风2003年十六省市电视台元旦戏曲晚会

=== Best Directing for a Literature and Art Program ===
- **Jin yue for CCTV New Year's Gala**

=== Best Art Direction for a Literature and Art Program ===
- **He Yonghong for Hainan TV Spring Festival Gala**

== Documentary ==
=== Best Television Documentary ===
- **Soong Ching-ling/宋庆龄'**
- **Old Mirror/老镜子**
- 东方之光——"三个代表"与理论创新
- 史前部落的最后瞬间
- Distance of Road Home/回家的路有多长

=== Best Short Documentary ===
- **Plum Blossom Blooming/腊梅花开**
- 阿艾石窟之谜
- 海路十八里
- 赶马帮的女人
- 遥远的画廊

=== Best Writing and Directing for a Television Documentary ===
- **Yu Lijun for 史前部落的最后瞬间**

=== Best Cinematography for a Television Documentary ===
- **Sun Kun/Shi Feng/Peng Yang for Distance of Road Home**

=== Best Sound Recording for a Television Documentary ===
not awarded this year

== Children & Teens Program ==
=== Best Animation ===
- **可可，可心一家人**
- 唐诗故事——枫桥夜泊·题李凝幽居
- 千千问——摩擦力消失之后—恐龙灭绝之谜
