= A Dangerous Affair =

A Dangerous Affair may refer to:

- A Dangerous Affair (1919 film), an American drama film directed by Charles Miller
- A Dangerous Affair (1931 film), an American mystery film directed by Edward Sedgwick
- A Dangerous Affair (1995 film), an American made-for-television thriller film directed by Alan Metzger

== See also ==
- The Dangerous Affair, a 2015 Chinese suspense thriller film directed by Zeyan Wang
- "Dangerous Affair", a 2017 single by Zoë (Austrian singer)
