= Vivian Hsu filmography =

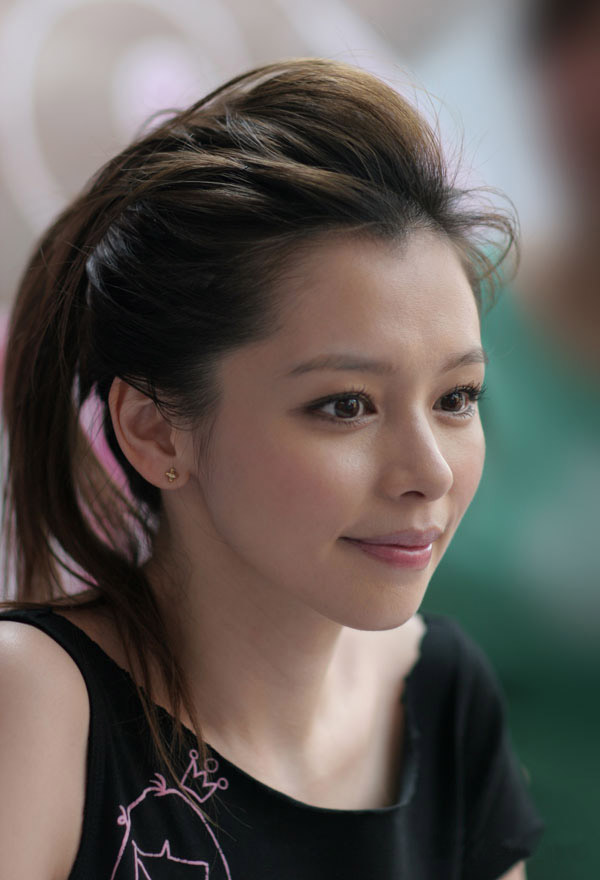
- Vivian Hsu in 2005
- Film: 35
- Television series: 5
- Others: 1

The following is the filmography of Vivian Hsu.

== Filmography ==
Year	Title	Alternate Title	Role	Notes
1994	Shaolin Popey	笑林小子	"Annie Chu"	
1994	Hunting List	終極獵殺	"Siu Hung"	
1995	Angel Heart	赤裸天使	"Wenny"	
1995	Devil Angel	魔鬼天使	"Tsui Siu Suen"	aka Evil Angel
1996	Dragon in Shaolin	龍在少林	"Siu-Suen"	
1996	Adventurous Treasure Island	黃金島歷險記	"Siu Sin"	
1997	L-O-V-E... Love	超級無敵追女仔	"Sola"	
1997	Shoot, My Darlin'	殺し屋&嘘つき娘	"Liwa"	Japanese film
1997	We're No Bad Guys	愛上百份百英雄	"Tinny Chung"	aka We Are No Bad Guys
1998	Chivalrous Legend	俠盜正傳	"Liu"	
1998	Your Place or Mine!	每天愛您8小時	"Ah Yu"	
1999	A Tale of Rascal	流氓學生		
2001	The Accidental Spy	特務迷城	"Yong"	
2005	The Shoe Fairy	人魚朵朵	"Dodo"	
2006	The Knot	雲水謠	"Wang Biyun"	
2007	One Last Dance	茶舞	"Mae"	
2008	If You Are the One	非誠勿擾	pregnant candidate	guest star
2009	The Star and the Sea	少年星海	"Huang Suying"	
2010	Hot Summer Days	全城熱戀熱辣辣	"Wasabi"	
2010	Fire of Conscience	火龍	"Ellen"	
2010	Dancing Without You	背著你跳舞		
2010	Juliets	茱麗葉		
2011	Seediq Bale	賽德克·巴萊	"Hatsuko Takayama"	
2011	The Sorcerer and the White Snake	白蛇傳說	"Goblin"	aka Madame White Snake
2011	Sleepless Fashion	與時尚同居	"Yinghong"	
2012	Perfect Two	新天生一對	"Li"	
2013	The Action Zero	變身超人		
2013	Saving Mother Robot	瑪德2號	"Cao Yi"	
2013	Rhythm of the Rain	聽見下雨的聲音		
2013	A Chilling Cosplay	制服		
2013	-197c Murder	冰裸杀	Jeana	
2014	Lock Me Up, Tie Him Down	完美假妻168	Tiffany	
2014	Sex Appeal	寒蟬效應	Fang An-Yu	
2018	The Tag-Along: The Devil Fish	红衣小女孩外传:人面鱼	Huang Ya-Hui	
2019	Mayday Life	五月天人生无限公司3D	Lin Chi-ling's high school friend	Documentary film
2020	The Confidence Man JP: Episode of the Princess	コンフィデンスマンJP プリンセス編	Bridget Fu	Japanese film
2020	Little Big Women	孤味	Chen Wan-yu	also producer
2022	Mama Boy	初戀慢半拍	Le Le	

== TV series ==
Year	Title	Alternate Title	Role	Notes
1999	Semi-Double	セミダブル	"Kanda Ranran"	
2001	My Marriage	本家のヨメ	"Yamada Nozomi"	
2003	Love Storm	狂愛龍捲風	"Zhao Jia Le"	
2006	Till Death Do Us Apart	別愛我	"Fei Yang"	
2008	Love Strategy	戀愛兵法	"Sun Yu Xuan"	
2013	The Files of Young Kindaichi -Lost in Kowloon-	金田一少年の事件簿 -香港九龍財宝殺人事件-		TV movie
2020	Palace of Serendipity	故事宮寓	Treasure: High Picture of Lushan Mountain	
2021	Who's By Your Side	誰在你身邊	"Zeng Yong-jie"	
2021-2022	Light the Night	華燈初上	"Chiung-fang"	Guest actor

== Anime ==
Year	Title	Alternate Title	Role	Notes
2002	Mobile Suit Gundam SEED	機動戦士ガンダムSEED	"Aisha"	Episodes 19, 21, 26; Sung theme song OP 2

== Awards and nominations ==
Year	Award	Category	Nomination	Result
2007	Chinese Film Media Awards	The Shoe Fairy	Best Actress	Nominated
2008	Hundred Flowers Awards	The Knot	Best Actress	Nominated
2019	Taipei Film Festival	The Devil Fish	Best Actress	Nominated
