= Ngawang Rinchen =

Chinese actor of Tibetan descent (born 1984)

- ངག་དབང་རིན་ཆེན་
- Born: February 26, 1984 (age 42); Lhasa, Tibet, China
- Education: Shanghai Theatre Academy
- Occupation: Actor
- Years active: 2007-present

Chinese name
- Chinese: 阿旺仁青
Transcriptions
Standard Mandarin
- Hanyu Pinyin: Āwàng Rénqīng

Tibetan name
- Tibetan: ངག་དབང་རིན་ཆེན་

Ngawang Rinchen (Tibetan: ངག་དབང་རིན་ཆེན་, Wylie: ngag dbang rin chen; Chinese: 阿旺仁青; pinyin: Āwàng Rénqīng; born 26 February 1984) is a Chinese actor of Tibetan descent.

== Early life and education ==
Ngawang Rinchen was born in Lhasa, Tibet, China. He graduated from Shanghai Theatre Academy in 2007, where he majored in acting. After graduation, he was assigned to Tibetan Drama Troupe.

== Career ==
Ngawang Rinchen had his first experience in front of the camera in 2013, and he was chosen to act as a support actor in The Untold Story of Tibet, a historical television series starring Guo Xiaodon, Shen Aojun and Cao Bingkun. That same year, he made his film debut in A Doctor, A General, playing Peng Cuo.

In 2014, he starred in Phurbu & Tenzin, a historical television series directed by Fu Dongyu and written by A Lai. For his role as Danzeng, he won the Newcomer Award at the 15th Golden Phoenix Awards, the Best Newcomer Award at the 23rd Shanghai Film Critics Association, and the Newcomer Award at the 15th Huabiao Awards. At the same year, he co-starred with Jiang Shuying and Chen Jin in A Noble Spirit.

== Filmography ==
=== Film ===
Year	English title	Chinese title	Role	Notes
2013	A Doctor, A General	门巴将军	Peng Cuo	
2014	Phurbu & Tenzin	西藏天空	Danzeng	
2014	Thang-ga	唐卡	The Living Buddha	
2014	A Noble Spirit	天上的菊美	Jumei Duoji	

=== Television series ===
Year	English title	Chinese title	Role	Notes
2013	The Untold Story of Tibet	西藏秘密	Phurbu Tsering	
2014	—N/a	琼杰·达瓦卓玛	Langjie	
2018	Ever Night	将夜	Cheng Lixue	
