= Sun Haiying =

Chinese actor (born 1956)

- 孙海英
- Born: October 7, 1956 (age 70); Shenyang, Liaoning, China
- Occupation: Actor
- Years active: 1987–present
- Spouses: A female pharmacist (1979 - ?); Lǚ Lìpíng (m. 2002)
- Children: A son (deceased)
- Parent(s): Sun Haichang; Hai Na
- Awards: 15th Shanghai International Film Festival - Best Supporting Actor; 2012; Flying Apsaras Award for Outstanding actor 2002

Chinese name
- Traditional Chinese: 孫海英
- Simplified Chinese: 孙海英
Transcriptions
Standard Mandarin
- Hanyu Pinyin: Sūn Hǎiyīng

Sun Haiying (Chinese: 孙海英; born 7 October 1956) is a Chinese actor.

Sun is noted for his roles as Shi Guangrong and Hong Qigong in the television series The Years of Intense Emotion (2001) and The Legend of the Condor Heroes (2002) respectively. He has now gained even greater popularity from his breakthrough role as Fan Zeng in King's War (2012).

Sun has won the 15th Shanghai International Film Festival - Best Supporting Actor in 2012 and the Flying Apsaras Award for Outstanding actor in 2002.

== Life ==
Sun was born in a wealthy and highly educated family in Shenyang, Liaoning on October 7, 1956, the son of Hai Na (Chinese: 海娜), an actress, and Sun Haichang (Chinese: 孙海昌), the President of Liaoning People's Art Theatre.

At the age of 7, he joined the People's Liberation Army in Tibet, he was transferred to Fujian Military Region in 1979. Sun joined Shenyang Theatre in 1989 and became an actor.

On February 26, 2016, Sun's Sina Weibo was banned.

Sun was twice married. Originally wed to a female pharmacist in 1979, the couple had a son, who died early.

After a turbulent divorce, he remarried in 2002. Lǚ Lìpíng, his second wife, who is also a Chinese notable actress. Both Sun and Lǚ are Protestants.

== Political positions ==
=== Role of the Chinese Communist Party ===
Sun questioned the statement "Without the Communist Party, There Would Be No New China", a slogan from a popular Chinese Communist Party (CCP) propaganda song, on his Sina Weibo. He publicly stated that "No matter who appeared, China will exist still."

=== Cultural Revolution ===
In August 2015, Sun said in a post on his Sina Weibo that "The Cultural Revolution is a crime against humanity, and we will never forgive it".

=== Homosexuality ===
Sun also stated in an interview that he believes homosexuality to be a dirty crime against humanity.

=== Freedom of religion ===
As a Protestant himself, Sun supported the freedom of religion on his Sina Weibo and opposed the CCP's control of religions.

== Filmography ==
=== Television ===
Year	English title	Chinese title	Role	Notes
1995	Walk Out of Mountain Tomorrow	明月出天山	Ma Baoshan	
1996	Northeast of the Godfather	东北教父	a bandit	
2002	Laughing in the Wind	笑傲江湖	Tian Boguang	
2001	The Years of Intense Emotion	激情燃烧的岁月	Shi Guangrong	
2002	The Holidays in My Heart	心中的节日		
2002	The Legend of the Condor Heroes	射雕英雄传	Hong Qigong	
2003	High Flying Songs of Tang Dynasty	大唐歌飞	Li Bai	
2003	Police in Tibet	西藏警察	Fang Ziguang	
2004	The Queen is Here	皇后驾到	Zhu Yuanzhang	
2004	Swear Not To Give Up	誓不罢休		
2005	The Prince of Han Dynasty	大汉天子3	Jiang Chong	
2006	The Man Out of the War	走出硝烟的男人	Zhong Yukun	
2006	The Sentry	霓虹灯下的哨兵	Lu Dacheng	
2007	My Father's Flag	父辈的旗帜	Zhong Shoucheng	
2008	A Woman's Epic	一个女人的史诗	Du Han	
2012	King's War	楚汉传奇	Fan Zeng	
2012	The Highest Interests	至高利益	Li Dongfang	
2017	There is a Sea in the East	东方有大海	Li Hongzhang	

=== Film ===
Year	English title	Chinese title	Role	Notes
1987	Operation Flashpoint	闪电行动		
1992	Swordsmen in Double Flag Town	双旗镇刀客	Yi Daoxian	
1992	Ball Game Fan	球迷心窍		
1995	The War	金戈铁马	Wang Zhen	
1996	The Sunflower	向日葵	Zhang Gengnian	
2001	Out of Xibaipo	走出西柏坡		
2001	Shanghai Woman	假装没感觉		
2002	Pretty Big Feet	美丽的大脚		
2004	Jade Goddess of Mercy	玉观音		
2006	Getting Home	落叶归根		
2007	The One Man Olympics	一个人的奥林匹克	Liu Zhaoxiu	
2008	1977 College Entrance Examination	高考1977		
2010	Under the Hawthorn Tree	山楂树之恋		
2012	The Sino-Japanese War at Sea 1894	1894·甲午大海战	Li Hongzhang	
2014	For Love or Money	露水红颜		
2015	Lost and Love	失孤		
2016	Out of Ordinary	非同小可		
2018	The Class of One	一个人的课堂	Song Wenhua	

== Awards ==
- 2002 Flying Apsaras Award for Outstanding actor
- 2012 The Sino-Japanese War at Sea - China Movie Channel Media Awards - Best Supporting Actor
