= Joan of Arc of Mongolia =

1989 film

- Directed by: Ulrike Ottinger
- Written by: Ulrike Ottinger
- Produced by: Hans Kaden
- Starring: Inés Sastre
- Cinematography: Ulrike Ottinger
- Edited by: Dörte Völz-Mammarella
- Release date: 30 March 1989
- Running time: 165 minutes
- Country: West Germany
- Language: German

Joan of Arc of Mongolia (German: Johanna D'Arc of Mongolia) is a 1989 West German drama film directed by Ulrike Ottinger. It was entered into the 39th Berlin International Film Festival. In 2017, it screened for a week at the Museum of Modern Art.

== Cast ==
In alphabetical order

- Badema
- Lydia Billiet
- Christoph Eichhorn as Officer's attache
- Sevimbike Elibay as 3. Mitglied der Kalinka Sisters
- Amadeus Flössner
- Irm Hermann as Secondary-school teacher Mueller-Vohwinkel
- Xu Re Huar as Princess Ulan Iga
- Jacinta as 1. Mitglied der Kalinka Sisters
- Peter Kern as Mickey Katz
- Else Nabu as 2. Mitglied der Kalinka Sisters
- Mark Reeder
- Inés Sastre as Giovanna
- Gillian Scalici as Fanny Ziegfeld
- Delphine Seyrig as Lady Windermere
- Nugzar Sharia as Russian officer
- Shurenhuar as a Mongolian princess
- Marek Szmielkin
