= The Heaven Sword and Dragon Saber (2009 TV series) =

2009 Chinese TV series

- Poster
- Also known as: Dragon Sabre Yitian; Heaven Sword & Dragon Sabre; New Heaven Sword & Dragon Sabre
- 倚天屠龙记
- Genre: Wuxia
- Based on: The Heaven Sword and Dragon Saber by Jin Yong
- Screenplay by: Liu Yi; Wang Xuejing; Cao Yiming; Ma Shuai
- Directed by: Yu Min
- Starring: Deng Chao; Ady An; Liu Jing
- Opening theme: "Hero of Huaxia" (华夏英雄) by Deng Chao
- Ending theme: "Worldly Song of Romance" (红尘恋歌) by Ady An and Cong Haonan
- Country of origin: China
- Original language: Mandarin
- No. of episodes: 40

Production
- Executive producer: Song Yaping
- Producers: Zhang Jizhong; Song Songlin; Zhao Guangbin
- Production location: China
- Cinematography: Yu Min; Guan Jianxiong
- Editors: Zhang Jin; Yu Hui
- Running time: ≈45 minutes per episode
- Production companies: Huayi Brothers; Beijing Cathay Media

Original release
- Network: Wenzhou TV
- Release: 23 October 2009 – 2009

Related
- The Return of the Condor Heroes (2006)

The Heaven Sword and Dragon Saber (倚天屠龙记) is a Chinese wuxia television series adapted from the novel of the same title by Jin Yong. It is a final instalment of a television trilogy produced by Zhang Jizhong, preceded by The Legend of the Condor Heroes (2003) and The Return of the Condor Heroes (2006). Unlike the previous adaptations, this remake is the first to be primarily based on the third edition of the novel. The series was first broadcast on Wenzhou TV in China in October 2009.

== Cast ==
- Deng Chao as Zhang Wuji
  - Shi Lei as Zhang Wuji (young)
- Ady An as Zhao Min
- Liu Jing as Zhou Zhiruo
  - Guo Bailu as Zhou Zhiruo (young)
- He Zhuoyan as Xiaozhao
- Zhang Meng as Yin Li
  - Jiang Yiyi as Yin Li (young)
- Lu Chen as Yang Buhui
  - Lu Ziyi as Yang Buhui (young)
- Zang Jinsheng as Xie Xun
- Ken Chang as Zhang Cuishan
- Wang Yuanke as Yin Susu
- Wang Jinghua as Miejue
- Li Shun as Ding Minjun
- He Jiayi as Ji Xiaofu
- Yu Chenghui as Zhang Sanfeng
- Li Tai as Song Qingshu
- Chen Jiming as Song Yuanqiao
- Wang Jiusheng as Yin Liting
- Guo Jun as Zhang Songxi
- Wang Jianguo as Yu Lianzhou
- Zhang Hengping as Yu Daiyan
- Wang Zhigang as Mo Shenggu
- Tan Feiling as Cheng Kun
- Tu Men as Chaghan Temur
- Sun Zuyang as Wang Baobao
- Zhou Xiaobin as Chen Youliang
- Ma Ling as Daiqisi
- Bai Junjie as Lu Zhangke
- Han Dong as He Biweng
- Wu Xiaodong as Yang Xiao
- Chen Zhihui as Yin Tianzheng / Jueyuan
- Guan Xiaoyu as Yin Yewang
- Hu Dong as Fan Yao
- Li Ming as Wei Yixiao
- Qiao Yu as Chang Yuchun
- Liu Qiang as Xu Da
- Yu Yu as Zhu Yuanzhang
- Yang Niansheng as Zhou Dian
- Zhou Gang as Shuobude
- Hou Yueqiu as Peng Yingyu
- Su Mao as Taoist Tieguan
- Zhang Yuzhou as Leng Qian
- Rocky Hou as Han Lin'er
- Wang Weiguo as Kongwen
- Tao Jixin as Kongzhi
- Cao Zhanyong as Yuanye
- Wu Kegang as Xihuazi
- Wu Xiaodong as He Taichong
- Bai Hailong as Du Dajin
- Xia Yu as Zhu Jiuzhen
- Wang Wei as Wu Qingying
- Zou Zongsheng as Wei Bi
- Xiao Zongling as Yin Wufu
- Zhou Dianying as Yan Heng
- Cecilia Liu as the Yellow Dress Maiden
- Yang Yi as Shi Huolong
- Li Dan as Asan
- Liu Ziyi as Xue Gongyuan
- Lu Shaoqiang as Jian Jie
- Wu Kegang as Xihuazi
- Du Yuming as Hu Qingniu
- Gao Baobao as Wang Nangu
- Xing Minshan as He Zudao

== Production ==
Shooting lasted five months from 18 October 2008 to 16 March 2009. Locations include the Wudang Mountains, Peach Blossom Island, Longyou Grottoes, Wuyi Mountains, and Hengdian World Studios.

== Renaming of "Shaolin Sect" to "Monks' Sect" ==
In the series, the Shaolin Sect (or Shaolin Monastery) has been renamed to "Monks' Sect" (僧人派). The change is believed to be because the producers wanted to avoid trademark infringement, since Shaolin Monastery has officially registered "Shaolin" as a trademark and has been involved in lawsuits with commercial companies over the use of "Shaolin" as a brand name or trademark.
