= Ren Quan =

- 任泉
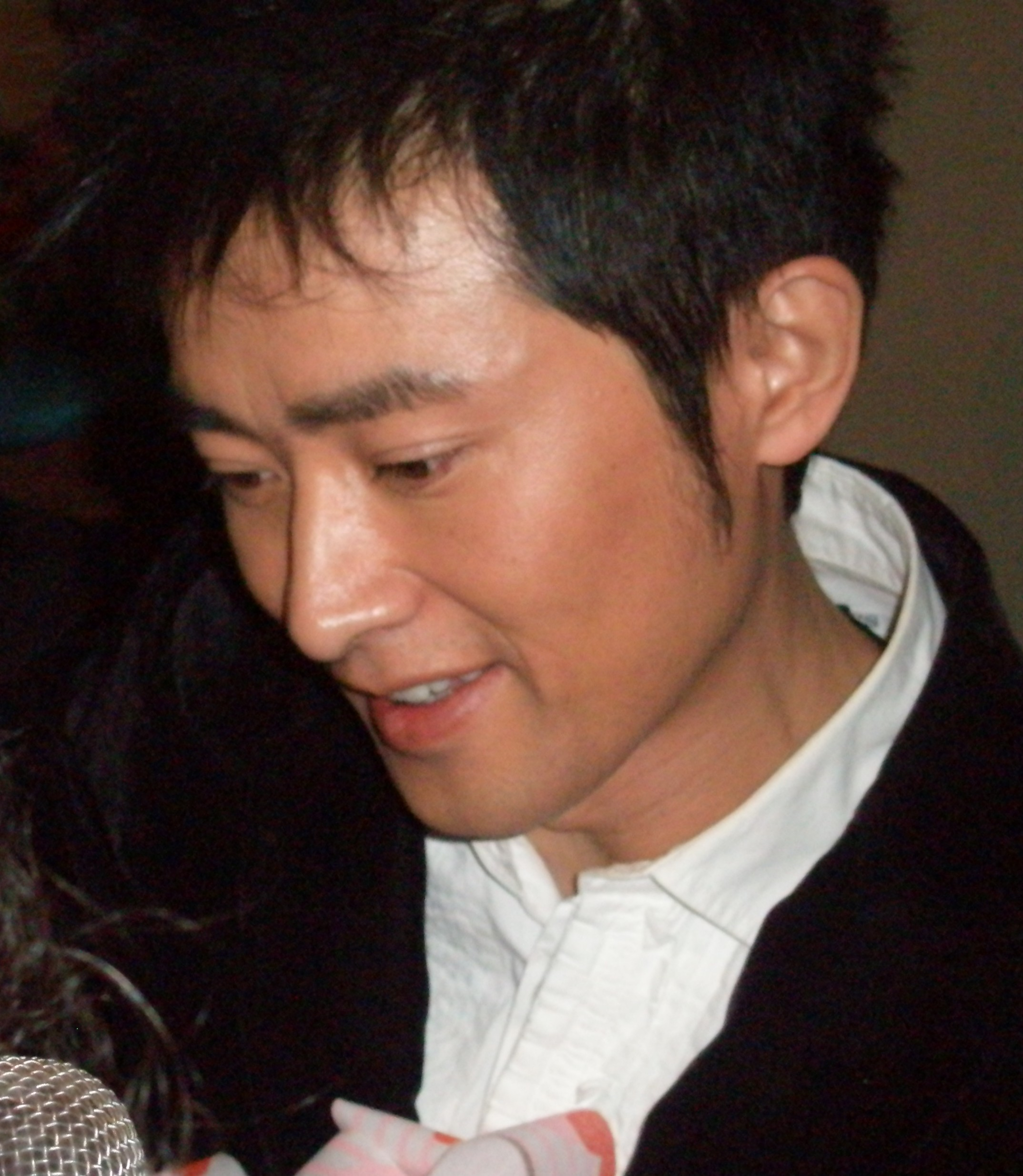
- Ren in 2010 in Nanjing, Jiangsu
- Born: Ren Zhenquan (任振泉); 4 March 1975 (age 51); Qiqihar, Heilongjiang, China
- Education: Shanghai Theatre Academy; Cheung Kong Graduate School of Business
- Occupations: Actor, investor, businessman
- Years active: 2000–2016 (acting career); 2016–present (investment career)
- Agent: Star VC
- Television: Young Justice Bao; All the Misfortunes Caused by the Angel; The Nation Under The Foot

Ren Quan (Chinese: 任泉; pinyin: Rén Quán; born 4 March 1975) is a Chinese actor, investor and businessman. One of his most prominent roles was as Gongsun Ce in Young Justice Bao and its sequel Young Justice Bao II, alongside Zhou Jie, Li Bingbing and Lu Yi. Other notable credits include All the Misfortunes Caused by the Angel and The Nation Under The Foot.

== Early life and education ==
Ren was born Ren Zhenquan (任振泉) in Qiqihar, Heilongjiang, on 4 March 1975. He attended the No. 6 School of Tiefeng District. In the Qiqihar No. 4 Railway Middle School, he became a literary soldier. He secondary studied at Heilongjiang Art Vocational School (黑龙江省艺术职业学校). In 1993, he was admitted to Shanghai Theatre Academy, where he studied alongside Li Bingbing, Xu Lu, Liu Xiaofeng, and Wang Yanan.

== Acting career ==
Ren made his television debut in Wait All the Way (1994), at the age of 19.

He became widely known to audiences with Young Justice Bao (2000), in which he portrayed Gongsun Ce, the assistant to Zhou Jie's character. That same year, he starred in All the Misfortunes Caused by the Angel, playing the romantic interest of Lin Xiaoru, Li Xiaolu's character. He also co-starred with Li Bingbing and Li Zonghan in the historical television series The Nation Under The Foot.

In 2001, he reprised his role in the Young Justice Bao sequel, Young Justice Bao II. He had key supporting role in the romantic comedy television series The Book of Love, opposite Fan Bingbing and Le Jiatong. He also appeared in Meeting Aquarium, a romantic comedy television series starring Lu Yi and Mei Ting.

Ren co-starred with Nicky Wu in the 2002 wuxia television series Musketeers and Princess, adapted from Woon Swee Oan's novel of the same title.

In 2007, he made a guest appearance on Feng Xiaogang's war film Assembly. He co-starred with Li Bingbing in the music video Kang Mei's Love, which was one of the most watched music TV in mainland China in that year. He had a small role in The Double Life, a comedy film starring Zhang Jingchu, Daniel Chan, and Wang Luoyong.

In 2009, Ren portrayed the role of Yan Hui in Hu Mei's biographical drama film Confucius, for which he received Best Supporting Actor nomination at the 19th Golden Rooster Awards.

Ren was cast in time travel television series The Myth (2010), playing the elder brother of Hu Ge's characters. He had a lead role in the war television series, New Drawing Sword.

In 2011, he had a cameo appearance in Palace, a historical romantic television series starring Yang Mi, Feng Shaofeng and Mickey He. He co-starred with Zuo Xiaoqing in Love of The Millennium, based on Chinese folk legend Legend of the White Snake.

In 2012, he co-produced and had a small role in Swordsman, a wuxia television series adaptation based on Jin Yong's the novel The Smiling, Proud Wanderer.

Ren had key supporting role in the television series adaptation of Su Tong's Wives and Concubines (2014).

In 2016, he appeared in Singing All Along, a historical romantic television series starring Ruby Lin, Yu Bo and Yuan Hong.

On 17 March 2016, he announced his retirement from acting on his Sinaweibo and devoted all his energy to business.

== Investment career ==
After gradation in 1997, Ren founded the "Shu Spicy Fish" (蜀地辣子鱼; 'Spicy Fish in Sichuan') restaurant on the street outside the campus of Shanghai Theatre Academy. In 2005, he co-founded the 1969 Bar, which was reshuffled as "Shu Ecological Hotpot" (蜀地原生态火锅; 'Ecological Hotpot in Sichuan') in the following year and invested more than 2 million yuan in Huayi Brothers. He founded the "Legend of Shu in Guangdong" (广东蜀地传说) in 2009, Shanghai Qiangsheng Film and Television Culture Media Co., Ltd. (上海强盛影视文化传媒有限公司) in 2010, and "Hot and Spicy No.1" (热辣壹号) in 2013. In 2014, Ren co-founded Star VC, a venture capital company, with Huang Xiaoming and Li Bingbing. In 2015, he was invited to participate in the Boao Forum for Asia.

== Filmography ==
=== Film ===
Year	English title	Chinese title	Role	Notes
1997	Love and Murder	犬杀	He Ziming	
1998	Sima Dun	司马敦	Little Shanghai	
1999	Legend of Vegetables	绿色柔情	Tian Ye	
2004	Love Message	短信一月追	David	
2007	Assembly	集结号	Political instructor	
2009	Panda Express	熊猫大侠	Zhao Qian	
2010	Confucius	孔子	Yan Hui	
2010	The Double Life	A面B面	Psychiatrist	
2012	The Brother	黑暗中的救赎	Lin Yu	
2013	The Chrysalis	女蛹	Luo Jia	
2014	Night Mail	死亡邮件	Situ Minghao	

=== Television ===
Year	English title	Chinese title	Role	Notes
1995	Midnight	子夜	Fan Bowen	
1995	Wait All the Way	一路等候	Wang Hao	
1996		儿女情长	Tong Shabo	
1997	Fairy Tales at the End of the Century	世纪末的童话	Xiang Zaoru	
1998	General	将军	Jin Cheng	
1999	Legend of Dagger Lee	小李飞刀	Shangguan Fei	
1999	Voice of the Nation	民族之声	Nie Er	
1999		青春出动	Shu Tong	
2000	The Nation Under The Foot	一脚定江山	Liu Fusheng	
2000	Young Justice Bao	少年包青天	Gongsun Ce	
2000	All the Misfortunes Caused by the Angel	都是天使惹的祸	Shao Jianbo	
2001	The Book of Love	爱情宝典	Qin Zhong	
2001	Rogue Doctor	流氓太医	Nong Caotang	
2001	Zhuge Liang	卧龙小诸葛	Zhuge Liang	
2001	Prime Minister Little Gan Luo	宰相小甘罗	Prince	
2001	Young Justice Bao II	少年包青天2	Gongsun Ce	
2001	Meeting Aquarium	海洋馆的约会	Luo Gang	
2002	Musketeers and Princess	名捕震关东	Leng Xue	
2002	Age of Blossom	花样的年华	Guo Shunjing	
2003	Shattered	危情24小时	Liu Zheng	
2003	Like A Beautiful Butterfly Flying	就像美丽蝴蝶飞	Cheng Jiaxing	
2004	Qing Hui Merchants	大清徽商	Wang Zonggao	
2004	The Dragon Heroes	赤子乘龙	Li Bin	
2004		残剑震江湖	Prince Changle	
2005	Parisian Love Song	巴黎恋歌	Ji Wei	
2006	Born in the Sixties	生于六十年代	Guan Hao	
2006	For Truly Great Men	数风流人物	Wang Weiming	
2006	Boy, Where Are You	孩子你在哪里	Gu Weimin	
2007	Inside and Outside Marriage	婚内外	Han Ruoding	
2007	Those Charming Memories	那些迷人的往事	Yang Zhifei	
2008	Father's War	父亲的战争	Qin Tianshu	
2008		都叫我三妹	Yan Zihao	
2010	The Myth	神话	Yi Dachuan	
2011	Palace	宫锁心玉	Yongzheng Emperor in the dream	
2011	Love of The Millennium	又见白娘子	Xu Xian	
2011	New Drawing Sword	新亮剑	Zhao Gang	
2013	Swordsman	笑傲江湖	Dan Qingsheng	
2013	Just Let Me Be	放开我的手	Su Ting	
2013	Protect Love Fearlessly	爱情面前谁怕谁	A singer in the bar	
2014	Lanterns	花灯满城	Gu San	
2014	The Lady in Cubicle	格子间女人	Qu Feng	
2016	Singing All Along	秀丽江山之长歌行	Yin Lu	
