= CCTV-6 =

Chinese TV channel

CCTV-6 电影 China Movie Channel
- Country: China

Programming
- Picture format: 1080i HDTV (downscaled to 576i for the SDTV feed)

Ownership
- Owner: Publicity Department of the Chinese Communist Party

History
- Launched: 1 January 1996; 30 years ago

Links
- Website: tv.cctv.com/cctv6

Availability

Terrestrial
- Digital TV (DTMB): Digital channel number varies by area.

Streaming media
- CCTV program website: CCTV-6 (some programs may screened off due to copyright restriction)
- 1905 live: CCTV-6

China Movie Channel (Note: simplified Chinese: 电影频道; traditional Chinese: 電影頻道; pinyin: Diànyǐng píndào) refers both to a government-affiliated production agency and to the movie-focused television channel CCTV-6 operated under its direction. The agency, officially known as the "Satellite TV Show Production Facility", (Note: simplified Chinese: 电影卫星频道节目制作中心; traditional Chinese: 電影衞星頻道節目製作中心; pinyin: Diànyǐng wèixīng píndào jiémù zhìzuò zhōngxīn; lit. 'Satellite TV Show Production Facility') is a division of the National Radio and Television Administration of the People's Republic of China. It is responsible for producing content and managing operations for CCTV-6, a dedicated movie channel that forms part of the broader China Central Television system.

CCTV-6, also branded as the China Central Television Movie Channel, occupies a unique position as both a government-run propaganda outlet and a commercial entertainment broadcaster. It uses the branding and logo of China Central Television (CCTV), which is a subsidiary of the China Media Group. The channel plays a dual role: supporting the state's cultural and ideological messaging through film while also catering to public entertainment demand. It has aired major state productions such as the CCTV New Year's Gala since 1996, and frequently broadcasts state-approved domestic and international films.

Nationwide coverage is achieved through encrypted satellite signals via ChinaSat 6B and ChinaSat 9, and the channel's reach extends to digital cable and IPTV networks. In addition to its flagship free-to-air channel, the Movie Channel also operates the CHC (China Home Cinema) series of premium pay-TV movie channels—including "CHC Home Cinema", "CHC Action Movie", and "CHC Movie Fan". It manages the professional film portal "1905.com" and publishes the print and digital magazine China Screen. It also holds an awards show.

== History ==
In 1993, director Li Qian-kuan and 29 deputies of the National People's Congress proposed the establishment of a "China Movie Channel" during the first session of the 8th National People's Congress. In June 1994, with approval from the former Ministry of Radio, Film and Television of the People's Republic of China, the directly affiliated institution Film Satellite Channel Program Production Center (commonly known as the Movie Channel Program Center) was established.

On 30 November 1995, at 8:30 AM, the Movie Channel commenced trial broadcasts, airing 16 hours of programming daily. The channel utilized dual identifiers: the "CCTV +6" logo in the top-left corner and "Movie Channel" in the bottom-right. Initially, during advertisements and promotional segments, the "Movie Channel" logo was absent but was later replaced with a graphical logo. From 1 January 1996, the channel officially launched under the call sign Ministry of Radio, Film and Television's Movie Satellite Channel, becoming part of the China Central Television channel lineup and broadcasting nationwide. By February 1997, the channel had attracted 20% of China's television viewing audience. At the time, the channel had an annual amount of movies (1,000 per year) for a daily 16-hour schedule, consisting of Chinese movies that were produced at least two years before, as well as cheap foreign movies. Usually, a day on CCTV-6 consisted of six Chinese productions and two foreign ones, for an average of fifteen out of the sixteen hours on air. The remaining hour of programming largely consisted of filler material, mostly made by CCTV.

In 1998, following the Institutional reform of the State Council, the former Ministry of Radio, Film and Television was downgraded to a ministerial-level institution directly under the State Council, becoming the State Administration of Radio, Film, and Television. Consequently, the official name of the Movie Channel was changed to State Administration of Radio, Film, and Television's Movie Satellite Channel. In June 1999, the channel gained an increase in its investment, especially with the potential rise in the film industry in China. The channel had aired a limited number of national movies due to low production figures since its 1995 launch. By then, the channel had become the second most-popular in China, behind its main channel, CCTV-1. A November 2001 survey conducted by the China Mainland Marketing Research Company reported CCTV-6 as having 700 million viewers, with 81.4% of surveyants preferring the channel.

In 2004, the China Movie Channel Program Center launched the digital pay-TV channel China Movie Channel and the "China Movie Channel" (CMC) aimed at North American audiences through its subsidiary Huacheng Film & Television Digital Program Co., Ltd. In 2005, the "China Movie Channel" (CMC) was launched in Hong Kong. Starting 1 January 2006, the channel began 24-hour broadcasting, and in the same year, CHC HD Movie Channel and CHC Action Movie Channel were launched. In addition, the Program Center also began offering Video On Demand (VOD) services. It has since developed into a multi-channel, high-quality, and clustered program platform.

On 28 September 2012, the State Administration of Radio, Film, and Television approved the channel's simultaneous broadcast in both SD and HD. In December of the same year, the HD version was officially launched. Initially, up until 25 November 2012, China Central Television (CCTV) was responsible for the broadcasting and satellite uplink of the channel. On 26 November 2012, as part of a transition of some CCTV channels to a new site, the program feed responsibility was shifted to the China Movie Channel Program Center, with CCTV only managing the SD uplink. (CCTV ceased backup broadcasting on 9 December 2012.) This resulted in the channel being unable to independently broadcast national mourning programming on 4 April 2020, during the National Day of Mourning, instead simulcasting CCTV-1.

In 2013, as part of a reorganization of State Council institutions, the functions of the General Administration of Press and Publication and the State Administration of Radio, Film, and Television were merged to form the State Administration of Press, Publication, Radio, Film and Television, and the former "SARFT Movie Channel Program Center" was renamed accordingly.

On 1 April 2015, the channel adopted a new gold-colored logo at the lower-right corner.

On 28 September 2018, following the 2018 institutional reform, the State Administration of Press, Publication, Radio, Film and Television was abolished, and its film and media oversight duties were transferred to the Publicity Department of the Chinese Communist Party. The program center was accordingly renamed to the China Movie Channel Program Center under the Publicity Department of the CCP.

Starting 1 January 2022, the channel was selected by the General Administration of Sport of China as the official television platform for announcing China Sports Lottery results.

== Major events ==
- China Movie Channel Media Awards
- China Film Big Data Ceremony
- Bay Area Rising Moon Film and Music Gala (since 2021 and 2023, co-hosted with Bauhinia Culture Holdings Limited and Phoenix Television)

== Channels ==
=== Official website ===
The portal site of the channel is "1905.com". The domain name "1905" refers to the beginning of Chinese or Chinese-language cinema. In addition to providing news, the website offers digital films produced by the China Movie Channel as well as on-demand streaming for films to which the channel holds online rights.

=== Special broadcast arrangements ===
In response to international or domestic events, the Movie Channel sometimes cancels or changes its scheduled programming, broadcasting films related to current affairs, or sometimes films that may be interpreted as critical of the country involved. As a result, Chinese netizens have nicknamed the channel "Princess 6" (六公主). In response, Dong Ruifeng, director of the Programming Department of the Movie Channel under the Publicity Department of the CCP, stated: "In certain special situations, we do make emergency changes in programming. We are using film as an art form to respond to the current times."

== Film collaborations ==
CCTV-6/CMC also co-produced three American movies, usually with Paramount Pictures:

- Transformers: Age of Extinction (2014) (with Paramount Pictures, Platinum Dunes, and di Bonaventura Pictures)
- Mission: Impossible – Rogue Nation (2015) (with Bad Robot, Skydance Productions, TC Productions, and Alibaba Pictures)
- Teenage Mutant Ninja Turtles: Out of the Shadows (2016) (with Nickelodeon Movies, Platinum Dunes, and Alibaba Pictures)

== See also ==
- China Central Television
- China Media Group
- China Movie Channel Media Awards
- Publicity Department of the Chinese Communist Party and China Film Administration
- State Administration of Press, Publication, Radio, Film and Television
- State Administration of Radio, Film, and Television
