= Phurbu & Tenzin =

- Poster
- 西藏天空
- Directed by: Fu Dongyu
- Screenplay by: Alai
- Release dates: April 15, 2014 (Shanghai); June 20, 2014 (Southwest China); August 29, 2014 (Guangdong); November 24, 2015 (Northern China)
- Running time: 118 minutes
- Country: China
- Languages: Tibetan; English; Mandarin
- Box office: CN¥16 million (China)

Phurbu & Tenzin (Chinese: 西藏天空) is a 2014 Chinese historical drama film directed by Fu Dongyu.

== Cast ==
- Lawang Lop
- Ngawang Rinchen
- Sonam Dolgar
- Yang Xue
- Duobujie

== Reception ==
=== Box office ===
The film earned CN¥16 million at the Chinese box office.

=== Accolades ===
Award	Date	Category	Recipients and nominees	Result
China Movie Channel Media Awards		Best Picture	Phurbu & Tenzin	Won
China Movie Channel Media Awards		Best Director	Fu Dongyu	Won
China Movie Channel Media Awards		Best Screenplay	A Lai	Won
China Movie Channel Media Awards		Best Actress in a Supporting Role	Sonam Dolgar	Won
China Movie Channel Media Awards		Best New Actor	Lawang Lop	Won
China Movie Channel Media Awards		Best New Actress	Yang Xue	Won
