= The Class of One =

- Traditional Chinese: 一個人的課堂
- Simplified Chinese: 一个人的课堂
- Hanyu Pinyin: Yígèrén Dě Kètáng
- Directed by: Li Junlin
- Written by: Wang Tianhua
- Produced by: Lan Xiuhui
- Starring: Sun Haiying; Han Sanming; Wang Naixun
- Production companies: Jiangxi Juxing Film and Television Media Co., Ltd. Provincial Party Committee of Jiangxi Province of the Communist Youth League; Beijing Shiguang Dongli International Film and Television Media Co., Ltd.
- Release dates: 28 September 2014 (Golden Rooster); 16 January 2018 (China)
- Running time: 117 minutes
- Country: China
- Language: Mandarin

The Class of One (Chinese: 一个人的课堂) is a 2014 Chinese feature film directed by Li Junlin and written by Wang Tianhua. It stars Sun Haiying, Han Sanming and Wang Naixun. The film based on the life of Zeng Qingping (曾庆平), a teacher in Ningdu No. 4 High School. The Class of One was released in China on January 16, 2018.

== Plot ==
Song Wenhua (宋文化) is a substitute teacher in a mountain village. His class has only one student, Tang Mingming (唐明明). Tang's father dies in an accident while laboring in a city. His mother leaves home for being unbearable of poverty-stricken life. But Song still sticks to his post. The Education Committee hold an examination for the unified transfer of substitute teachers, Song Wenhua is not passed the examination, and the Education Committee dismisses Song. The Education Committee sends a normal university student to replace Song. Facing such a bad environment, the university student resigns after two weeks. Tang Mingming's grandma, the village director and the leaders of the Education Bureau all take turns to do the ideological work of Song Wenhua, hoping Song could return to his post. Song is going to Guangdong to work. After a hard ideological struggle, Song returns to his post.

In order to thank Song, Tang Mingming's grandma came to the school to deliver meals every day. On a rainy day, grandma falls into the river and is paralyzed in bed. Tang does not go to school in order to take care of her grandmother at home. Song carries the blackboard to Tang Mingming's home to teach him. Soon after, Tang's grandma died of illness.

Song has been teaching him to the graduation of primary school, and ends his 30 years teaching career. Then Song goes to work in Guangdong, and each month insists on sending Tang Mingming 500 yuan of living expenses. Tang Mingming writes letters to his teacher and thanks his benevolence.

== Cast ==
- Sun Haiying as Song Wenhua, a substitute teacher.
- Wang Naixun as Tang Mingming, the only student in the class.
- Han Sanming as the village director.

The rest of the cast was played by locals of a village in Nandu County, Jiangxi.

== Production ==
The film is Li Junlin's directorial debut. When Li Junlin read the news that the number of China's "left-behind" children (留守儿童) was estimated to have surpassed 60 million, he was one of them in Hunan in his early years, and he decided to shoot a film about the "left-behind" children.

Principal photography started in March 2013 and wrapped in June 2013. Most of the film was shot on location in Ningdu County, Jiangxi.

== Release ==
The film premiered at 23rd Golden Rooster and Hundred Flowers Film Festival on September 28, 2014. The film was released on January 16, 2018, in China.

The film received mainly positive reviews. Sha Gang, a Peking University-educated poet said: "I was deeply moved by the teacher's spirit of sacrifice and the portrayal of a lower-class intellectual struggling to keep a hold on his faith and dreams."

== Accolades ==
Date	Award	Category	Recipient(s) and nominee(s)	Result	Notes
2016	Worldfest-Houston International Film Festival	Best Foreign Language Film	The Class of One	Won	
