= Young Justice Bao (Chinese TV series) =

- Chinese: 少年包青天
- Hanyu Pinyin: Shàonián Bāo Qīngtiān
- Genre: Historical, romantic comedy
- Based on: The Seven Heroes and Five Gallants and The Five Younger Gallants by Shi Yukun
- Written by: Huang Haohua
- Directed by: Hu Mingkai; Zeng Jin
- Starring: Zhou Jie; Lu Yi; Deng Chao; Ashton Chen; Ren Quan; Li Bingbing
- Country of origin: China
- Original language: Mandarin
- No. of seasons: 3
- No. of episodes: 125

Production
- Executive producers: Pan Hongye; Liu Zhiyi
- Production locations: Hengdian World Studios; Wuxi; Beijing Huairou Film and Television Base
- Production companies: Oriental Pearl TV Tower Culture Communication Co., Ltd.

Original release
- Network: Sohu Video, Tencent Video, Youku, iQiyi
- Release: September 4, 2000 – 2006

Young Justice Bao (Chinese: 少年包青天) is a 125-episode Chinese ancient legal drama series which was broadcast from 2000 to 2006 with three seasons. It stars Zhou Jie, Lu Yi and Deng Chao as the legendary Song dynasty jurist Bao Zheng. Other cast includes Ashton Chen, Ren Quan, Li Bingbing, and Cheng Pei-pei. The series is loosely based on The Seven Heroes and Five Gallants and The Five Younger Gallants by Shi Yukun.

== Cast ==
=== Season 1 ===
- Zhou Jie as Bao Zheng
- Ashton Chen as Zhan Zhao
- Ren Quan as Gongsun Ce
- Li Bingbing as Ling Chuchu
- Liu Yijun as Pang Feiyan
- Chen Daoming as The Eighth Prince
- Wang Huichun as Grand Tutor Pang
- Cheng Pei-pei as Bao Zheng's mother
- Jia Zhigang as Emperor Renzong of Song
- He Zhonghua as Shen Liang

=== Season 2 ===
- Lu Yi as Bao Zheng
- Ashton Chen as Zhan Zhao
- Ren Quan as Gongsun Ce
- Fan Bingbing as Xiao Qingting
- Li Hui as Lu Xiangxiang
- Liu Hu as Wang Chao
- Yao Jian as Ma Han
- Yao Liqun as Zhang Long
- Li Fei as Zhao Hu
- Tong Dawei as Emperor Renzong of Song
- Liu Wei as Prince
- Gong Fangmin as Eunuch

=== Season 3 ===
- Deng Chao as Bao Zheng
- Qin Li as Xiao Man
- Zhao Yang as Gongsun Ce
- Ashton Chen as Zhan Zhao
- Wu Qianqian as Bao Zheng's mother
- Yang Rong as Xiao Fengzheng
- Wu Yue as Yelu Juncai
- He Zhonghua as Pang Tong
- Jia Yiping as Emperor Renzong of Song
- Lin Hao as Aunt Xiao
- Li Jianyi as Gangster boss
- Xu Huanshan as Prince
- Shen Junyi as Grand Tutor Pang
- Han Xiao as Xiao Ruobing
- Wang Xuanyi as Mu Lan
- Li Donghan as Yelu Wencai
- Zhang Shaohua as a granny

== Production ==
In the first season, Huang Haohua wrote the script for two years. Shooting began in December 1999 and ended in April 2000. The producer invited Nicky Wu to play Bao Zheng, but he initially turned down the role because of the character design is too dark and ugly.

In the second season, Lu Yi replaced Zhou Jie to play the lead role Bao Zheng. The second season took place in Wuxi, Jiangsu.

In the third season, Deng Chao was cast as Bao Zheng. The third season was shot on locations in Beijing Huairou Film and Television Base.

== Soundtrack ==
No.	Title	Lyrics	Music	Singer(s)	Length
1.	"Worthy of the Heart (无愧于心)" (Opening theme)	Xiang Xuehuai	Wang Gang	Sun Nan
2.	"I Have You in My Life (只要有你)" (Ending theme)	Chen Songhong	Chen Songhong	Na Ying/ Sun Nan

== Reception ==
Douban, a major Chinese media rating site, gave 8.7 out of 10 for the first season, 7.6 out of 10 for the season season, and 7.2 out of 10 for the third season.
