= Smile Angel Foundation =

Chinese charity foundation

- Founded: November 21, 2006
- Founder: Li Yapeng and Faye Wong
- Purpose: Children born with clefts
- Location: Beijing
- Region served: People's Republic of China
- Method: Funding
- Revenue: ¥74,659,954.00 RMB (from 1 November 2006 to 31 December 2011)
- Endowment: ¥58,810,621.93 RMB (from 1 November 2006 to 31 December 2011)
- Website: Smile Angel Foundation

Smile Angel Foundation (Chinese: 嫣然天使基金; pinyin: Yānrán Tiānshǐ Jījīn; sometimes Yanran Angel Foundation) is a Beijing-based charity founded in 2006 by Li Yapeng and Faye Wong to help Chinese children born with clefts. It is affiliated with the Red Cross Society of China. The foundation is named after the couple's daughter, Li Yan, who was born in the same year with severe clefts and underwent corrective surgery in the United States.

By 2007, the foundation had raised 35 million renminbi, including 29.5 million from auctions at its first two December fundraisers. It had assisted more than 2,000 children by 2008, and about 7,000 by mid-2010. Since 2008, the charity has worked with eight urban hospitals to make an annual journey to remote areas of China, providing free operations to children of poor famililies. In April 2010, it was recognized by the Chinese Ministry of Civil Affairs as one of the 20 most influential charity projects in 2009.

On 1 December 2011, the foundation teamed up with Germany's Philharmonie der Nationen and held a charity concert in Shanghai for the 5th anniversary of the foundation.

In 2012, the charity established Beijing Smile Angel Children's Hospital, China's first charity hospital for children. It will offer free surgeries to 600 children with cleft lip each year. It has about 180 physicians and nurses, 10 percent of whom are volunteers.
