= Badema =

Chinese actress and singer

- Born: 1965 (age 60–61); Ejin Banner, Alxa League, Inner Mongolia
- Education: Central Conservatory of Music
- Occupations: Actress, singer
- Years active: 1979–present
- Notable work: Norjmaa
- Spouse: Bayin

Chinese name
- Traditional Chinese: 巴德瑪
- Simplified Chinese: 巴德玛
Transcriptions
Standard Mandarin
- Hanyu Pinyin: Bādémǎ

Badema (born 1965) is a Chinese actress and singer of Mongolian ethnicity best known for her role in Norjmaa, which earned her a Best Actress Award in the 30th Golden Rooster Awards.

== Biography ==
Badema was born in Ejin Banner, Alxa League, Inner Mongolia in 1965, to a family of singers. She attended literary and artistic activities since she was a teenager, and she is good at traditional Mongolian folk long song. In 1989 she graduated from Central Conservatory of Music, majoring in vocal music.

== Career ==
Badema's first leading role came with Ulrike Ottinger's 1989 West German drama film Joan of Arc of Mongolia, alongside Irm Hermann and Peter Kern. The movie was entered into the 39th Berlin International Film Festival. In 2017 it screened for a week at the Museum of Modern Art. The movie talks about "a group of cosmopolitan women passengers aboard the Trans-Siberian/Mongolian Railway," who are taken captive by the warrior princess Ulan Iga.

In 2013 she played Pagma in Nikita Mikhalkov's 1991 movie Urga (released in North America as Close to Eden). The movie was well received, and won the Golden Lion at the Venice Film Festival and Best European Film at the European Film Awards. It was also nominated for an Academy Award for Best Foreign Film, and for a Golden Globe in the same category. The movie tells about Gombo, his wife (Badema), and their family, and of their friendship with stranded Russian truck driver Sergei.

In 1997 she was in Wei Lu's Journey to Western Xia Empire, and in 2005 she played Bilike's mother in Ning Hao's Mongolian Ping Pong. In 2008 she played the title role in Bayin's Last Princess of Royal Blood: Tsetsenhangru.

Her greatest achievement so far came with the movie Norjmaa, also directed by Bayin, where she plays the title role. Badema won Best Actress Award at the 33rd Fajr International Film Festival, and the movie won the Best Film Award at the same awards. Badema won Best Actress at the Yakutsk International Film Festival, and Best Actress at the 30th Golden Rooster Awards.

== Personal life ==
Badema was married to Bayin (巴音额日乐), who is also a notable actor and director in China.

== Filmography ==
=== Film ===
| Year | Title | Chinese title | Role | Notes |
|---|---|---|---|---|
| 1989 | Joan of Arc of Mongolia | 蒙古的圣女贞德 | | |
| 1991 | Close to Eden | 蒙古精神 | Gombo's wife / Genghis Khan's wife | |
| 1994 | Jiruo and His Deer | 金秋鹿鸣 | | |
| 1997 | Journey To Western Xia Empire | 西夏路迢迢 | | |
| 2005 | Mongolian Ping Pong | 绿草地 | | |
| 2008 | Last Princess of Royal Blood: Tsetsenhangru | | Tsetsenhangru | |
| 2009 | Xilingol League and Wenchuan County | 锡林郭勒·汶川 | | |
| 2009 | Siqin Hangru | 斯琴杭茹 | Siqin Hangru | |
| 2013 | Norjmaa | 诺日吉玛 | Norjmaa | |

== Awards ==
| Year | Award | Category | Work | Result | Notes |
|---|---|---|---|---|---|
| 2015 | 3rd Yakutsk International Film Festival | Best Actress | Norjmaa | Won | |
| 2015 | 1st Rostov Motivational International Film Festival | Best Actress | Norjmaa | Won | |
| 2015 | 33rd Fajr International Film Festival | Best Actress | Norjmaa | Won | |
| 2015 | 30th Golden Rooster Awards | Best Actress | Norjmaa | Won | |
