= The Legend of the Condor Heroes (2003 TV series) =

2003 Chinese TV series

- Poster
- Also known as: Legend of Eagle Shooting Hero; Legend of the Arching Hero
- 射雕英雄传
- Genre: Wuxia
- Based on: The Legend of the Condor Heroes by Jin Yong
- Screenplay by: Lan Xiaolong; Shi Hang; Gong Yingtian; Zhang Ting
- Directed by: Yu Min; Wang Rui; Kuk Kwok-leung
- Creative director: Qian Yunxian
- Presented by: Chi Chenxi; Ma Zhongjun; Pu Mu
- Starring: Li Yapeng; Zhou Xun; Zhou Jie; Jiang Qinqin
- Opening theme: "Heaven and Earth Are in My Heart" (天地都在我心中) by Qiu Ye
- Ending theme: "True Love is Truly Beautiful" (真情真美) by Sun Nan and Valen Hsu
- Composer: Zhao Lin
- Country of origin: China
- Original language: Mandarin
- No. of episodes: 42

Production
- Executive producers: Pan Zhizhong; Tie Fo; Chen Jingsheng; Jiang Huai
- Producers: Zhang Jizhong; Meng Fanyao; Que Xin; Yang Niansheng; Huzi
- Production location: China
- Cinematography: Shao Jinghui; Ye Zhiwei; Zhang Zhendong; Wu Bin; Fang Ting
- Running time: ≈45 minutes per episode
- Production companies: Ciwen Film & TV Production

Original release
- Network: CCTV

Related
- The Return of the Condor Heroes (2006)

The Legend of the Condor Heroes (射雕英雄传), also known as Legend of Eagle Shooting Hero and Legend of the Arching Hero, is a Chinese wuxia television series adapted from the novel The Legend of the Condor Heroes by Jin Yong. It is the first instalment of a trilogy produced by Zhang Jizhong, followed by The Return of the Condor Heroes (2006), and The Heaven Sword and Dragon Saber (2009). It was first broadcast on CCTV in China in 2003.

== Cast ==
- Li Yapeng as Guo Jing
  - Wang Meng as Guo Jing (child)
- Zhou Xun as Huang Rong
- Zhou Jie as Yang Kang
- Jiang Qinqin as Mu Nianci
- Ding Haifeng as Yang Tiexin
- Zhao Liang as Zhou Botong
- Sun Haiying as Hong Qigong
- Cao Peichang as Huang Yaoshi
- You Yong as Ouyang Feng
- Wang Weiguo as Yideng
- Zhang Jizhong as Wang Chongyang
- Li Feng as Guo Xiaotian
- He Qing as Bao Xiruo
- Lü Liping as Li Ping
- Bao Dazhi as Wanyan Honglie
- Zhang Xiaojun as Chen Xuanfeng
- Yang Liping as Mei Chaofeng
- Liu Liwei as Ke Zhen'e
- Yu Youchuan as Zhu Cong
- Ba Te'er as Han Baoju
- Yang Guanghua as Nan Xiren
- Xie Ning as Zhang Asheng
- Wang Wei as Quan Jinfa
- Zhao Feng as Han Xiaoying
- Ba Sen as Genghis Khan
- Ba Yin as Jebe
- A'Siru as Huazheng
  - Yuan Yundi as Huazheng (child)
- Ma Liping as Jochi
- Bate as Ögodei
- Siqinbilige as Tolui
  - Meng Meng as Tolui (child)
- Zhou Haodong as Qiu Chuji
- Wang Gang as Wang Chuyi
- Li Xiaomin as Ma Yu
- Li Wei as Yin Zhiping
- Xiu Qing as Ouyang Ke
- Zhang Hengping as Lu Youjiao
- Li Yu as Qiu Qianren
- Wulan Baoyin as Lu Chengfeng
- Ren Yuanyuan as Cheng Yaojia
- Huang Chong as Lu Guanying
- Liu Kui as Duan Tiande
- Yang Niansheng as Liang Ziweng
- Wang Wensheng as Hou Tonghai
- Li Yihua as Sha Tongtian
- Cui Yong as Peng Lianhu
- Tong Ruimin as Wanyan Hongxi
- Huang Xiaolei as Shagu
- Liang Li as Yinggu

== Soundtrack ==
- "Heaven and Earth Are in My Heart" (天地都在我心中) by Qiu Ye
- "True Love is Truly Beautiful" (真情真美) by Sun Nan and Valen Hsu
- "Pain of Separation" (伤别离) by Cao Hai
- "You and I Are Well" (你与我共好) by Anita Mui
- "Will Not Forget When I See You Again" (见到你再不会忘) by Li Yapeng and Zhou Xun

== Production ==
Shooting locations include Inner Mongolia, Zhejiang and Red Hill Park.

== International broadcast ==
It aired in Thailand on Channel 3 in late 2004, dubbed as Mungkorn Yok. ("มังกรหยก", literally: Jade Dragon).
