= Zhang Jizhong =

Chinese director and producer (born 1951)

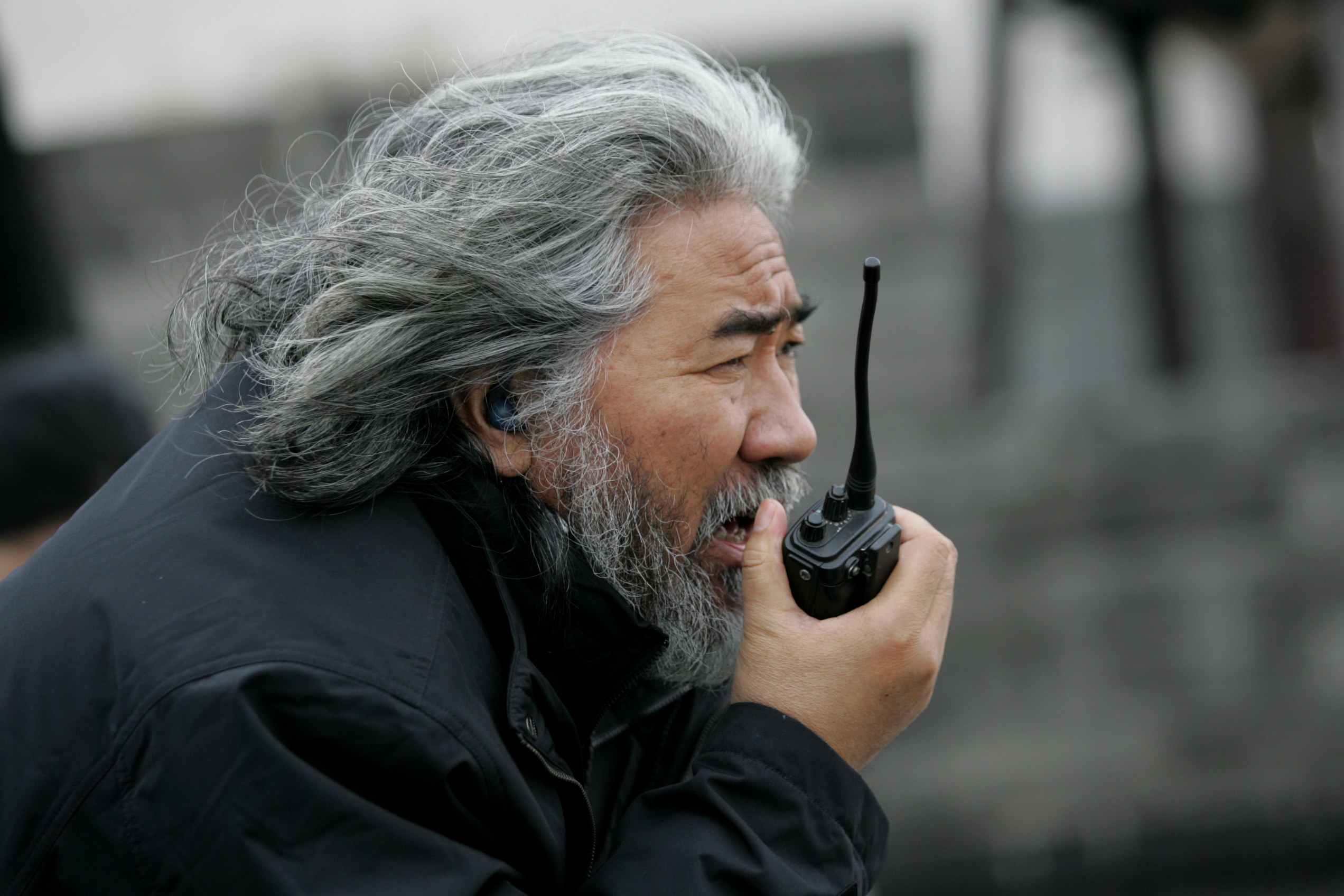
- Zhang directing on set
- Born: May 23, 1951 (age 75); Heze, Shandong, China
- Occupations: Film director; producer; actor; teacher; writer
- Years active: 1981–present

Chinese name
- Traditional Chinese: 張紀中
- Simplified Chinese: 张纪中
Transcriptions
Standard Mandarin
- Hanyu Pinyin: Zhāng Jìzhōng
Yue: Cantonese
- Jyutping: Zoeng1 Gei2 Zung1
- Musical career
- Also known as: "Beardy"

Zhang Jizhong (born May 23, 1951) is a Chinese director and producer. He is known for (co-)producing the CCTV adaptations of Romance of the Three Kingdoms and The Water Margin, as well as for directing TV adaptations of Louis Cha's wuxia novels.

== Early life ==
In Zhang's early life, he and his seven siblings endured many hardships because his father served as a county head for the Kuomintang. In the sixth grade, with the encouragement of one of his school teachers, he applied for the PLA School of Fine Arts, but was rejected after a background check on his father's political status, even though he passed the exams. Before 1972, he also applied to China's Central Academy of Drama and other schools, but his application was still rejected after a political check, despite passing the entrance requirements. During the Cultural Revolution, Zhang was sent to work in the countryside as part of the Down to the Countryside Movement, where he worked in a coal mining town in Shanxi for six years. In 1974, Zhang became a teacher in a coal mining town in Shanxi and taught history, Chinese and biology. He also led a literature and art performing troupe that consisted of coal workers and assumed the roles of director, screenwriter and composer.

== Career ==
=== Early career ===
After the collapse of the Gang of Four and at the time of the post-1978 reform and opening up in China, Zhang entered Shanxi's modern drama theater to become a stage actor. In 1979, a friend took him to a film set at the Shanghai Film Group Corporation, where he was discovered and later cast for the main role One Day When We Were Young, a television drama. In 1983, Zhang met Zhang Shaolin on set, who would become his long-term working partner. Zhang Jizhong and Zhang Shaolin's first television production as producer and director respectively, One Hundred Years of Suffering, won the Five One Award. Some of their other works, including Vice Squad General, The People's Policeman, and Good Man Yan Juqian, all won Flying Goddess awards, one of China's awards for television production.

=== Romance of the Three Kingdoms and The Water Margin ===
Romance of the Three Kingdoms, one of the Four Great Classical Novels of Chinese literature, was the first work Zhang did as a producer for China Central Television (CCTV). When Zhang Jizhong and Zhang Shaolin discovered that CCTV was auditioning producers and directors for the series, they went to Beijing to audition, only to discover that the roles of the five production teams were all taken. Unwilling to settle for a smaller role in Beijing, the Zhangs returned to Xiamen to continue working on their own television projects. One month later, Zhang received a note from CCTV saying that changes had been made to the production team, and there was an open position to film the fourth part of the show. Zhang accepted and went on to produce 13 of the 84 episodes for the series, when he had endure over 10,000 kilometers of travel in 11 months in the remote areas of Yunnan, Qinghai, Tibet and Inner Mongolia, as well as battle scenes involving thousands of extras and hundreds of horses. Two large film cities were built for the series in Hebei (33,000 m^{2}) and Wuxi (3,000 m^{2}), and have since become tourist attractions.

Following the success of Romance of the Three Kingdoms, the Zhangs were asked to produce The Water Margin, another one of the Four Great Classical Novels of Chinese literature. Zhang Jizhong and Zhang Shaolin were appointed as head producer and director respectively, and had full responsibility for the series. Martial arts were an important aspect of the production process for The Water Margin, and Zhang worked with choreographer Yuen Woo-ping. After three years and eight months of production, The Water Margin was broadcast on CCTV with high viewership and was the recipient of many Flying Goddess awards and made a profit of 100 million yuan for CCTV.

A scholarly analysis of the 1998 television adaptation argues that the religious layer of meaning in Lu Zhishen’s story was demystified through a modernization discourse.

=== Adaptations of wuxia novels ===
After the success of Romance of the Three Kingdoms and The Water Margin, Zhang was appointed a permanent position at CCTV. In 1999, Hong Kong writer Louis Cha told a mainland Chinese newspaper that if CCTV treated an adaptation of one of his novels as seriously as with Romance of the Three Kingdoms and The Water Margin, he would only charge one yuan for the rights. Zhang faxed Cha a reply and the next day, Cha gave Zhang the permission to choose one from his 14 novels. Zhang bought a frame, carved some patterns on it, inserted a one yuan note and gave it to Cha, who was pleased by the gift and the two have collaborated since then.

Zhang has produced several television series based on Louis Cha's wuxia novels from 2000 to 2006. Laughing in the Wind was the first mainland Chinese adaptation of Cha's The Smiling, Proud Wanderer. The series received mixed reviews because of Zhang's changes to the original story but it still received a very high 19% audience rating. Zhang's second production, The Legend of the Condor Heroes, premiered in 2003 and in Japan in 2005. Demi-Gods and Semi-Devils was broadcast in 2003. Zhang's adaptations of Cha's works received mixed reviews.

Besides producing wuxia television series, Zhang has also produced dramas including Farmer Labourer, which exposed the reality of migrant laborer problem at the time and Days of Passion and Spirit, which depicted military life. In 2008, Zhang and Huayi Brothers produced Bing Sheng, a historical television series based on the life of Sun Tzu, author of The Art of War.

=== Journey to the West ===
Zhang is in the pre-production phase of his film adaptation of Journey to the West, another one of the Four Great Classical Novels, with the story focusing on Sun Wukong, a household name in China and in other Asian countries like Japan and South Korea. He has hired Neil Gaiman as a screenwriter and the two were introduced to each other by James Cameron, who turned down the role as director, but has agreed to help with the special effects of the film. Each of the three films in the trilogy is expected to have a budget of $100 million, which would make them the most expensive films made in Chinese history. John Woo's Red Cliff budgeted roughly $80 million and currently holds the record for the Chinese film with the highest budget. Zhang is also developing a theme park, an online game and a television series based on his company's digitized content of Sun Wukong and Journey to the West.

== Recognition ==
In recent years, many of Zhang's works have brought in strong social and media response and considerable financial benefits. In a seminar, Zhang was referred to as the "Number One Producer in Chinese Television" by experts in Chinese television and film industry for his contributions on the landscape of film production in China from a director centered system to a producer centered system. In China, producers usually only play the roles of logistic managers and accountants, but Zhang redefined the role of a film producer in China by coordinating all the aspects of the production, bearing responsibility for screenwriting, directing, creative staff, investment, media relations, casting, social issues, and personal matters. Traditionally, most of this work was handled by the film director, but experts explain that they give him such a title because he has popularized and contributed to the producer-centered system in China. Jiang Ouli, Secretary-General of the Chinese Radio and Television Association, said that a successful producer in China must be a successful politician, artist, manager and operator and that the rise of the producer centered system in China's film industry is part of the development process, which is becoming closer to the Hollywood model.

Zhang has also built large filming sets and villages in coordination with the development of the local tourism market. By negotiating with the local governments, Zhang is able to get local governments to invest in the film cities, which after filming are used to attract revenue from tourists and develop the area. During the filming of Laughing in the Wind and The Legend of the Condor Heroes, 40 million yuan was exempted with 28 million yuan going towards the development of Peach Blossom Island, The investment by the local Zhoushan government was used for the construction of the Peach Blossom Island Arching City, roads, bridges, accommodation, and marketing. The Legend of the Condor Heroes provided promotion for the attraction and tourism for the Peach Blossom Island increased tenfold the year the show was released. In 2008, Peach Blossom Island boasted 900,000 visitors. From negotiating and attracting investment from the local government in Zhejiang, CCTV only invested 30 million yuan in Laughing in the Wind, while enjoying over 70 million yuan in revenue from advertisement and overseas distribution. The Demi-Gods and Semi-Devils film city in Dali was also a success, and cost 110 million yuan to construct, with the park covers an area of 4,500 m^{2}.

Zhang was nominated as a candidate for the 2007 Green Chinese Awards, an award ceremony run by the China Environment Culture Promotion Association (CECPA).

== Filmography ==
=== Film ===
Year	Title	Role	Notes
1981	Wu Lian 舞恋		
1982	Taiwan Yihen 台湾遗恨		

=== Television ===
Year	Title	Role	Notes
1983	Yang Jia Jiang 杨家将	Yang Yanzhao	
1989	One Hundred Years of Suffering 百年忧患	producer	Won Five One Award
1989	The People's Policeman 有这样一个民警	producer	Won Flying Goddess Award
1990	Good Man Yan Juqian 好人燕居谦	producer	Won Flying Goddess Award, Five One Award
1990	Vice Squad General 刑警队长	producer	
1994	Romance of the Three Kingdoms 三国演义	producer	Won Flying Goddess Award, Golden Eagle Awards, Five One Award
1995	Trench People 沟里人	producer	Won Flying Goddess Awards, Five One Award
1998	The Water Margin 水浒传	"Cui Jing", producer	Won Golden Eagle Awards, Flying Goddess Award, Five One Award
1999	Blue Enchantress 蓝色妖姬	producer	
2001	Laughing in the Wind 笑傲江湖	"Wang Yuanba", producer	
2002	Qing Yi 青衣	"Huzi", producer	Won Flying Goddess Award
2002	Knife of Guanxi 关西无极刀	"King of Loulan"	
2003	The Legend of the Condor Heroes 射雕英雄传	"Wang Chongyang", producer	
2003	Demi-Gods and Semi-Devils 天龙八部	"Wang Jiantong", producer	Won Golden Eagle Awards
2003	Day of Passion and Spirit 激情燃烧的岁月	producer	Won Golden Eagle Award, Flying Goddess Awards, Five One Award
2004	Hero During Yongle Period 永乐英雄儿女	producer	
2004	Farmer Labourer 民工	producer	
2004	The Proud Twins 小鱼儿与花无缺	"Old Hongye"	
2006	The Return of the Condor Heroes 神雕侠侣	"Yelü Chucai", producer	Won Tom Online Award, Chinese TV Drama Award
2006	Heroes on Lüliang Mountain 吕梁英雄传	producer	Won Five One Award, Golden Eagle Award
2006	Abao De Gushi 阿宝的故事	producer	
2007	Sword Stained with Royal Blood 碧血剑	"Meng Bofei", producer	
2008	Royal Tramp 鹿鼎记	producer	Won XTEP and Tencent 2008 Awards
2008	Bing Sheng 兵圣	producer	
2008	Paladins in Troubled Times 大唐游侠传	producer	
2009	The Heaven Sword and Dragon Saber 倚天屠龙记	producer	
2009	Nima's Summer 尼玛的夏天	producer	
2011	Journey to the West 西游记	"Taishang Laojun", producer	
2011	Flight Attendant Diary 空姐的日记	producer	
TBA	Yanhuang Da Di 炎黄大帝	producer	
TBA	Juhua Zui 菊花醉	producer	
2017	Ode to Gallantry 俠客行	producer	
