= A Noble Spirit =

- Film poster
- Directed by: Miao Yue
- Starring: Ngawang Rinchen; Jiang Shuying; Chen Jin
- Release date: 20 May 2014
- Running time: 105 minutes
- Country: China
- Language: Mandarin

A Noble Spirit (Chinese: 天上的菊美) is a 2014 Chinese biographical documentary film directed by Miao Yue and starring Ngawang Rinchen, Maggie Jiang and Chen Jin.

== Cast ==
- Ngawang Rinchen
- Jiang Shuying
- Chen Jin
