= Mongolian Ping Pong =

- Film poster
- Directed by: Ning Hao
- Written by: Ning Hao
- Produced by: He Bu; Lu Bin
- Starring: Hurichabilike; Dawa; Geliban; Badema; Yidexinnaribu
- Cinematography: Du Jie
- Edited by: Jiang Yong
- Music by: Wuhe
- Distributed by: Bavaria Film International
- Release date: February 11, 2005 (Mongolia)
- Running time: 102 minutes
- Country: China
- Language: Mongolian

Mongolian Ping Pong (simplified Chinese: 绿草地; traditional Chinese: 綠草地; pinyin: Lü cao di) is a 2005 Mongolian language Chinese film written and directed by Chinese director Ning Hao.

The story is a gentle art film about a Mongolian boy who discovers a ping pong ball and his journey of discovery about its origins.

== Cast ==
- Hurichabilike
- Dawa
- Geliban
- Badema
- Yidexinnaribu
