= The Return of the Condor Heroes (2006 TV series) =

2006 Chinese TV series

- Poster
- 神雕侠侣
- Genre: Wuxia
- Based on: The Return of the Condor Heroes by Jin Yong
- Screenplay by: Liu Yi; Wang Xuejing; Tan Lan; Lang Xuefeng
- Directed by: Yu Min; Zhao Jian
- Presented by: Ma Zhongjun; Pu Shulin; Chi Chenxi; Tie Fo
- Starring: Huang Xiaoming; Liu Yifei
- Theme music composer: Johnny Chen
- Opening theme: "Unrivalled" (天下无双) by Jane Zhang
- Ending theme: "Laugh in the Jianghu" (江湖笑) by Wakin Chau, Zhang Jizhong, Huang Xiaoming, Hu Jun & Johnny Chen
- Country of origin: China
- Original language: Mandarin
- No. of episodes: 41

Production
- Executive producers: Du Daning; Xu Lu; Zhou Li; Zhang Huijian
- Producers: Zhang Jizhong; Song Yaping; Que Xin
- Production location: China
- Cinematography: Yu Min; Ye Zhiwei; Gu Qiming
- Running time: ≈45 minutes per episode
- Production company: Ciwen Pictures

Original release
- Network: CCTV
- Release: 13 March 2006

Related
- The Legend of the Condor Heroes (2003); The Heaven Sword and Dragon Saber (2009)

The Return of the Condor Heroes (神雕侠侣) is a 2006 Chinese wuxia television series adapted from the novel of the same title by Jin Yong. It is the second instalment of a trilogy produced by Zhang Jizhong, preceded by The Legend of the Condor Heroes (2003), and followed by The Heaven Sword and Dragon Saber (2009). It was first broadcast on 17 March 2006 in mainland China and subsequently broadcast in other regions such as Hong Kong, Taiwan, South Korea, and Singapore.

== Synopsis ==
The story follows the adventures of Yang Guo, an orphaned boy. From his humble beginnings, the streetwise Yang Guo gets passed around from one prestigious master to another but none of them will teach him any martial arts. While escaping from the Quanzhen School's Zhao Zhijing, he meets Xiaolongnü, the woman who will become his martial arts master and eventually the love of his life.

== Cast ==
- Huang Xiaoming as Yang Guo
  - Xie Yunshan as Yang Guo (child)
- Liu Yifei as Xiaolongnü
- Wang Luoyong as Guo Jing
- Kong Lin (actress) as Huang Rong
- Jessey Meng as Li Mochou
- Yang Mi as Guo Xiang
- Kenny Bee as Gongsun Zhi
- Chen Zihan as Guo Fu
  - Chen Anni as Guo Fu (child)
- Wang Ning as Wu Dunru
  - Chen Yalun as Wu Dunru (child)
- Zhao Jintao as Wu Xiuwen
  - Ye Qile as Wu Xiuwen (child)
- Huang Xiaolei as Shagu
- Chen Jiming as Qiu Chuji
- Liu Naiyi as Zhao Zhijing
- Jiang Yi as Ke Zhen'e
- Li Yu as Qiu Qianren
- Yang Rui as Lu Wushuang
  - Ge Shimin as Lu Wushuang (child)
- Wang Jia as Cheng Ying
  - Wang Jiayi as Cheng Ying (child)
- Zhao Liang as Zhou Botong
- Di Naishe as Ouyang Feng
- Yu Chenghui as Huang Yaoshi
- Dali as Hong Qigong
- Ba Yin as Jinlun Guoshi
- Gao Hu as Huodu
- Cheng Haofeng as Zhen Zhibing
- Wang Weiguo as Yideng
- Fu Miao as Gongsun Lü'e
- Sun Lihua as Wanyan Ping
- Zhao Hongfei as Yelü Qi
- Tian Zhong as Lu Qingdu
- Li Mingqi as Granny Sun
- Liang Li as Yinggu
- Xiu Ge as Yinkexi
- Zhang Hengping as Lu Youjiao
- Zhang Jizhong as Yelü Chucai
- Li Ming as Qiu Qianchi
- Yuan Yuan as Kublai Khan
- Liu Kui as Möngke Khan
- Su Mao as Wang Chuyi
- Guo Jun as Wang Chongyang
- Zhou Haodong as Lu Liding
- Heizi as Feng Mofeng
- Zhao Dandan as Hong Lingbo

== Production ==
Shooting began in October 2004 and ended in May 2005. Locations included Zhejiang, Chongqing, Shandong, Guangdong, Liaoning, Beijing and Sichuan's Jiuzhaigou Valley.

Scenes from The Legend of the Condor Heroes (2003) were featured as flashbacks including the scene depicting Yang Kang's death. Zhou Jie makes a cameo appearance as Yang Kang.

== Soundtrack ==
The music for the series was taken from motion picture scores of films such as Terminator 2: Judgment Day, Independence Day, The Day After Tomorrow, Van Helsing, Master and Commander: The Far Side of the World, Harry Potter and Batman Begins.

The chorus from Iwasaki Taku's "Shades of Revolution", a Rurouni Kenshin OVA musical score, was used in a minor fight scene between Yang Guo and Li Mochou in episode 30.

The melody of the song "Dearest" by Ayumi Hamasaki, famous for being in InuYasha, can be heard in the background in episode 15 during the scene where Gongsun Zhi is talking to Xiaolongnü at the Passionless Valley.

The melody used for condor appearances was taken from Hans Zimmer's "All of Them", notable for being part of the OST of the 2004 film King Arthur.

=== Track listing ===
The Return of the Condor Heroes - Original Soundtrack (神雕侠侣 - 电视主题曲原声大戏)

Soundtrack album Audio CD/Digital downloads by Various artists
- Released: May 13, 2006
- Length: 1:10:23
- Label: Rock Records

The original soundtrack was released on 13 May 2006 from Rock Records (滚石国际音乐股份有限公司). There are two versions of the soundtrack. The mainland Chinese release contains a total of 15 tracks while the Taiwanese release includes two bonus tracks. The original score was composed by Johnny Chen.

The Return of the Condor Heroes - Original Soundtrack (神雕侠侣 - 电视主题曲原声大戏)
No.	Title	Singer	Length
1.	"Flying Together (双飞)"	Huang Xiaoming & Della Ding	5:01
2.	"Unrivalled (天下无双)" (Opening theme song)	Jane Zhang	5:13
3.	"Drifting Clouds (浮云)"	composed by Johnny Chen	0:48
4.	"Laugh in the Jianghu (江湖笑)" (Ending theme song)	Wakin Chau, Hu Jun, Huang Xiaoming, Zhang Jizhong & Johnny Chen	4:44
5.	"Voice of Xiaolongnü (龙女之声)"	vocals by Fan Zhuqing	2:58
6.	"Falling Petals (落花)"	Michelle Pan	5:58
7.	"Affection (恨蒼天)"	composed by Johnny Chen	4:56
8.	"Journey (路途)"	composed by Johnny Chen	4:48
9.	"Ask the World (问世间)"	vocals by Zhang Xin	4:24
10.	"A Curtain of Nether Dream (一帘幽梦)"	Chen Xiuzhou and Xiao Manxuan	2:39
11.	"Moon in the Water (水中月)"	composed by Johnny Chen	4:10
12.	"Solitary Wind Blur (孤风残影)"	composed by Johnny Chen	4:56
13.	"Connubial (比翼双飞)"	composed by Johnny Chen	5:14
14.	"Starlight (星光)"	composed by Johnny Chen	4:25
15.	"War Dance (战舞)"	composed by Johnny Chen	2:02
16.	"Love Being in Love (恋着多喜欢)" (Taiwanese edition bonus track)	Fish Leong	3:53
17.	"Do You Still Remember Me (你还记得我吗)" (Taiwanese edition bonus track)	Fish Leong	3:54
Total length:			1:10:23
