= Norjmaa =

- Traditional Chinese: 諾日吉瑪
- Simplified Chinese: 诺日吉玛
- Hanyu Pinyin: Nuòrìjímǎ
- Directed by: Bayin
- Starring: Badema
- Release date: July 20, 2014
- Country: China
- Language: Mongolian

Norjmaa is a 2014 Chinese film directed by Bayin. Norjmaa won Best Film Award and Best Actress Award at 33rd Fajr International Film Festival (2015), Best Actress Award and Best Cinematographer Award at Yakutsk International Film Festival (2015), Best Actress Award at Golden Rooster Awards (2015).
