= Ashton Chen =

Chinese actor and martial artist (born 1988)

- Born: 6 January 1988 (age 38); Dengfeng, Zhengzhou, Henan, China
- Occupations: Actor; Martial artist
- Years active: 1993–2003; 2005–2007; 2009–present
- Parent: Chen Tong-shan

Stage name
- Traditional Chinese: 釋小龍
- Simplified Chinese: 释小龙
Transcriptions
Standard Mandarin
- Hanyu Pinyin: Shī Xiǎolóng
Yue: Cantonese
- Jyutping: Sik1 Siu2 Lung4

Birth name
- Traditional Chinese: 陳小龍
- Simplified Chinese: 陈小龙
Transcriptions
Standard Mandarin
- Hanyu Pinyin: Chén Xiǎolóng
Yue: Cantonese
- Jyutping: Can4 Siu2 Lung4
- Website: ShiXiaolong.com (archived)

Ashton Chen Xiaolong (born 6 January 1988 in Dengfeng, Zhengzhou, Henan), also known by his stage name Shi Xiaolong ("Sik Siu-Lung" in Cantonese), is a Chinese actor and martial artist. He is also credited as Xiaolung, Tommy Sik, Shi Xiao-Lung, Shi Xiao-Long, Shi Shao-Long, Shieh Shiao-Long, Xi Xiao-Long, Sik Siu-Loong, and S. L. Sik on some of his films. He has been a disciple of Shi Yongxin, the current abbot of Shaolin Temple, since he was two years old. Originally named "Chen Xiaolong", Chen was given a dharma name—Shi Xiaolong—by the abbot. He was taught martial arts by his father and Shi Yongxin at a young age. He gained attention in the entertainment industry after his performance at the International Shaolin Kung Fu Festival in Zhengzhou at the age of four. He became a child actor in China and achieved great success in films such as the 1994 martial arts comedy Shaolin Popey (笑林小子). In 2003, he stopped acting and went to study in the United States. In 2005, he returned to China and starred as Zhan Zhao in the television series Young Justice Bao III. In 2007, he continued his studies in the United States and graduated from high school in 2008 from the prestigious Performing Children's School (PCS) in New York City. He has continued his acting career in China since then. In 2010, Chen played one of Ip Man's students in the martial arts film Ip Man 2.

== Filmography ==
- Shaolin Popey (1994)
- Shaolin Popey II: Messy Temple (1994)
- Ten Brothers (1995)
- Super Mischieves (1995)
- The Saint of Gamblers (1995)
- China Dragon (1995)
- Dragon in Shaolin (1996)
- Adventurous Treasure Island (1996)
- Chivalrous Legend (1997)
- Heavenly Legend (1999)
- The Marvellous Cook (2000)
- Young Justice Bao (2000)
- Young Justice Bao II (2001)
- Chinese Heroes (2001)
- Teenage Gambler (2002)
- Undiscovered Tomb (2002)
- Black Mask Vs. Gambling Mastermind (2002)
- Kung Fu in Japan (2002)
- Nothing! Nothing! Nothing! (2002)
- Kung Fu Cooker (2002)
- Fatal Comic (2002)
- The Recreant Teenager
- Iron Lion (2003)
- Shaolin Gang (2004)
- Young Justice Bao III (2005)
- Ocean Paradise (2010)
- Legend of the Swordsman (2010)
- Ip Man 2 (2010)
- Rhythm of the Rain (2013)
- Urban Games (2014)
- Gutian Conference (2016)
- The Founding of an Army (2017)
- Martial Universe (2018)
- Crossing (2026)
- Wings of Dread (2026)

=== Reality shows ===
Year	Title	Chinese title	Note	Ref.
2020	Super Penguin League; Season:3	超级企鹅联盟super3	Player; Live Basketball Competition	
