= The Dangerous Affair =

- Poster
- 零点杀机
- Directed by: Zeyan Wang
- Production companies: Mengying Time (Beijing) Media; Shenzhen Zhihui Media; Beijing Minghao Zhongxing Cultural Development; Henan Shijie Media; Shaoyidian Entertainment (Dalian); Beijing Wanbo Xingchen Media 北京恒丰影视文化传媒有限公司
- Distributed by: Mengying Time (Beijing) Media; Henan Shijie Media
- Release date: 16 October 2015
- Running time: 91 minutes
- Country: China
- Language: Mandarin
- Box office: CN¥0.3 million

The Dangerous Affair (Chinese: 零点杀机) is a 2015 Chinese suspense thriller film directed by Zeyan Wang. The film was released on 16 October 2015.

== Cast ==
- Zhou Jie
- Lawrence Ng
- Qi Cheng
- Chao Guo
- Yu Wang
- Minqiang Jin

== Reception ==
The film has earned CN¥0.347 million at the Chinese box office.
