= Red Poppies =

1998 novel by Alai

- Simplified Chinese: 尘埃落定
- Traditional Chinese: 塵埃落定
Transcriptions
Standard Mandarin
- Hanyu Pinyin: Chén'āiluòdìng

Red Poppies (Chinese: 尘埃落定) is a 1998 Chinese-language novel by the Tibetan Chinese writer Alai, whose theme is based on the Tibetan custom and traditions. The novel consists of 12 chapters with a total of 481,000 Chinese characters. It won the Mao Dun Literature Prize in 2000.

== Summary ==
Set in Ngawa, Sichuan, the novel chronicles the stories of a Tibetan Tusi and his family from the 1920s to 1949, which gives a general introduction to the economic development in Ngawa, the territorial disputes among Tibetan chieftains, and the fights for throne succession.

== Main characters ==
=== Family of Tusi Maiqi ===
- The first-person narrator: considered as an 'idiot', the second son of Tusi Maiqi, mother is a Han Chinese
- Tusi Maiqi: father of the first-person narrator
- Mother: the second wife of Tusi Maiqi, a Han Chinese woman as a gift given to Maiqi by a merchant trading furs and herbs
- Brother: the eldest son of Tusi Maiqi, son of Maiqi's first wife, considered as the successor of Tusi Maiqi
- Sangji Zhuoma: maid of the first-person narrator
- The lame butler
- Weng Bo Yi Xi: Lama of Gelug
- Suo Lang Ze Lang: attendant of the first-person narrator
- Yang Zong: used to be the woman of the chieftain Zhazha, belongs to Tusi Maiqi after Zhazha's death
- Lama Menba
- Sister: half-blooded, shares the same father with the narrator, lives in London
- Uncle: Tusi Maiqi's younger brother, trades in India
- The silversmith: later marries Sangji Zhuoma

=== Other characters ===
- Special commissioner Huang: an official of the national government
- Tusi Ronggong: a female Tusi
- Tana: the beautiful daughter of Tusi Ronggong
- Tusi Laxueba
- Tusi Wangbo

== Reception ==
Comments by the selection committee of the Mao Dun Literature Prize: "The novel narrates from a unique viewpoint, with a rich connotation of Tibetan culture. A slight of fantasy enhances the artistic expression. The writing style is light, charming and poetic".

== Adaptations ==
- TV series: a television adaptation of Red Poppies was first shown in 2003.
- Dance drama: Red Poppies was adapted into a dance drama by Hong Kong Dance Company in 2006.
