= Shaolin Popey =

- Film poster
- Traditional Chinese: 笑林小子
- Directed by: Kevin Chu (朱延平）
- Written by: Din Ya Min（丁亚民); Yip Wan-Chiu
- Produced by: Hsu Pei-Yun
- Starring: Jimmy Lin; Hao Shao-wen; Ashton Chen; Xu Hao Ying; Zhang Zhen Yue
- Cinematography: Chen Jung-Shu
- Edited by: Chen Po-Wen
- Music by: Li Fu
- Distributed by: Mei Ah Entertainment
- Release date: 21 July 1994
- Running time: 95 minutes
- Countries: Taiwan; Hong Kong
- Languages: Mandarin; Cantonese

Shaolin Popey (Chinese: 笑林小子; released in the Philippines as Little Shaolin) is a 1994 Taiwanese kung fu comedy film directed by Kevin Chu. The movie premiere was on 21 July 1994. It is starred Lin Zhiying, Xu Ruoxuan, Hao Shaowen, Shi Xiaolong, and Zhang Zhenyue. Lin Zhiying and Zhang Zhenyue also sang. The movie tells the story of a young boy who helps his older brother to win the love of a girl. It is a youth comedy. The hero celebrity is Lin Zhiying, little comedian Jimmy Hao Shao Wen, the mainland kung fu boy Shi Xiaolong. Singer Zhang Zhenyue and Taiwan's new pure girl Xu Ruoxuan have become big highlights of the film, and the performance of Hong Kong stars Xu Haoying, Yuan Qiong Dan, Qin Pei can not be ignored. The movie itself has two related film spin-offs, Messy Temple (笑林小子2之新烏龍院) and Super Mischieves (新烏龍院2之無敵反鬥星).

== Synopsis ==
Pi Shao Ting (also 四毛) is the son of a director. He is a student in Hong Kong High School. He falls in love with principal's granddaughter Anne, which makes her boyfriend Tie Ying angry. He often bullies Pi Shao Ting. Thus, Pi Shao Ting determines to date Anne in order to provoke him. However, Tie Ying has the right to punish every student. Later, Pi Shao Ting's father is required to travel to the Mainland with his wife and children (including Pi Shao Ting) due to work commitments as a director. There Pi Shaoting meets Shaolin monk kid, and is trained to learn Martial arts in the Shaolin Temple in Taiwan. Having returned to Hong Kong, one day he goes to the principal's office. He happens to hear a dialogue about conspiracy between the father and his son. Afterwards, the principal sees through their trick and withdraws his duties. However, dismissed as principal, he plans to kidnap Anne to force the principal to give up his power. With the help of Shaolin kid and Pi Shao Ting, Anne and his grandfather get out of danger. Pi Shao Ting, for a long time, thinks that he loves Anne. At last, he realizes that the girl he really loves is Zhen Zhu (珍珠), the girl who is always accompanying him.

== Cast ==
- Jimmy Lin (林志穎) as Pi Shao Ting (皮少庭)
- Hao Shao-wen (Chinese: 郝劭文; pinyin: Hǎo Shàowén; Wade–Giles: Hao Shao-wen, aka Steven Hao) as Pi Shao Quan (皮少全)
- Ashton Chen (AKA Shi Xiaolong, simplified Chinese: 释小龙; traditional Chinese: 釋小龍) as Chen Xiao Long (陳小龍)
- Xu Hao Ying (徐濠萦) as Zhen Zhu (珍珠)
- Zhang Zhen Yue (張震岳) as Tie Ying (鐵鷹)
- Xu Ruo Xuan (徐若瑄) as Anne (安妮)

== Release ==
Shaolin Popey was released in Hong Kong on 21 July 1994. In the Philippines, the film was released as Little Shaolin by World Films on September 7, 1994, with Ashton Chen credited as Tommy Shik.
