= Laughing in the Wind =

2001 Chinese TV series

- promotional poster
- Also known as: State of Divinity; The Smiling, Proud Wanderer; Blood Cold and Proud Hot
- 笑傲江湖
- Genre: Wuxia
- Based on: The Smiling, Proud Wanderer by Jin Yong
- Screenplay by: Zhou Kai; Chen Yuxin; Chen Bing
- Directed by: Huang Jianzhong; Yuan Bin
- Presented by: Zou Qingfang
- Starring: Li Yapeng; Xu Qing
- Theme music composer: Zhao Jiping
- Ending theme: "Laughing Proudly in the Jianghu" (笑傲江湖) by Liu Huan and Faye Wong
- Country of origin: China
- Original language: Mandarin
- No. of episodes: 40

Production
- Executive producer: Li Ding
- Producer: Zhang Jizhong
- Production location: China
- Cinematography: Shen Xinghao
- Running time: ≈45 minutes per episode
- Production company: CCTV

Original release
- Network: CCTV
- Release: March 26, 2001

Laughing in the Wind (笑傲江湖) is a 2001 Chinese wuxia television series adapted from the novel The Smiling, Proud Wanderer by Jin Yong. Produced by CCTV, it starred Li Yapeng and Xu Qing, and was first broadcast on CCTV on March 26, 2001.

== Cast ==
- Li Yapeng as Linghu Chong
- Xu Qing as Ren Yingying
- Wei Zi as Yue Buqun
- Miao Yiyi as Yue Lingshan
- Li Jie as Lin Pingzhi
- Chen Lifeng as Yilin
- Lü Xiaohe as Ren Woxing
- Tu Men as Zuo Lengshan
- Liu Dong as Ning Zhongze
- Ba Yin as Xiang Wentian
- Li Qinqin as Abbess Dingyi
- Zang Jinsheng as Monk Bujie
- Yang Kun as Mute Granny
- Feng Xijun as Fangzheng
- Yang Niansheng as Fangsheng / Shangguan Yun
- Peng Denghuai as Yu Canghai
- Yu Chenghui as Feng Qingyang
- Huang Zongluo as Ping Yizhi
- Li Fei as Lan Fenghuang
- Sun Haiying as Tian Boguang
- Xiu Zongdi as Liu Zhengfeng
- Cong Zhijun as Qu Yang
- Liu Zhongyuan as Mo Da
- Zhang Hengping as Lu Bai
- Mao Weitao as Dongfang Bubai
- Niu Baojun as Yang Lianting
- Wang Zhenrong as Taoist Chongxu
- Gong Lifeng as Lu Dayou
- Zhao Fuyu as Lao Denuo
- Zhang Jizhong as Wang Yuanba
- Wang Wensheng as Cheng Buyou
- Qi Zhongkun as Zu Qianqiu
- Han Yipeng as Laotouzi
- Li Qiang as Taoist Tianmen
- Li Qishan as Yujizi
- Li Jingjing as Sang Sanniang
- Yuan Fang as Yihe
- Niu Xingli as Lüzhuweng
- Li Zhonghua as Mu Gaofeng
- Xia Zongxue as Huang Zhonggong
- Wulan Baoyin as Heibaizi
- Yu Hongzhou as Tubiweng
- Bo Shan as Danqingsheng
- Li Zhenping as Lin Zhennan
- Zhao Jian as Fei Bin
- Ding Cuihua as Wang Yuanba's wife
- Zhang Chengwu as Wang Bofen
- Li Yihua as Wang Zhongqiang
- Wei Feng as Tong Baixiong
- Han Fuli as Bao Dachu
- Wang Cheng as Yu Renhao
- Lin Feng as Luo Renjie
- Sun Cundie, Li Xiaobo, Xu Jingyi, Ma Yan, Wang Xinfeng, Ju Xingmao as the Six Immortals of the Peach Valley

== International releases ==
Laughing in the Wind was released in the United States in a four-part DVD volume by Knight Mediacom International in 2005. A 10-DVD box set was released in 2005 in South Korea under the title Swordsman.
