= Xu Ang =

Hinese court astronomer

Xu Ang (Chinese: 徐昂; pinyin: Xú Áng) was a Chinese court astronomer of the Tang dynasty.

Shortly after Emperor Xianzong's ascension in 805, he created the Guanxiang Calendar (觀象曆), which was used throughout Emperor Xianzong's reign beginning in 807.

In 822, during Emperor Muzong's reign, he created the Xuanming calendar, one of the most influential calendars in the world. It was used for 71 years in China, for at least 475 years in Korea, and for 823 years in Japan.
