= Li Yapeng =

Chinese actor

- 李亚鹏
- Born: September 27, 1971 (age 54); Ürümqi, Xinjiang, China
- Citizenship: Chinese (Hong Kong)
- Education: The Central Academy of Drama (BA, Acting); Cheung Kong Graduate School of Business (EMBA)
- Occupation: actor-turned-businessman
- Years active: 1997–2010
- Spouse: Faye Wong (m. 2005; div. 2013) Haiha Jinxi (m. 2022; div. 2025)
- Children: Li Yan; Li Xia

Chinese name
- Traditional Chinese: 李亞鵬
- Simplified Chinese: 李亚鹏
Transcriptions
Standard Mandarin
- Hanyu Pinyin: Lǐ Yà Péng

Li Yapeng (Chinese: 李亚鹏; born September 27, 1971) is a Chinese actor-turned-businessman. He is known for his roles in the TV drama Eternal Moment (1998) and in two CCTV television adaptations of Louis Cha's wuxia novels, as Linghu Chong in Laughing in the Wind (2000) and as Guo Jing in The Legend of the Condor Heroes (2003). Li announced his retirement from acting in 2010.

== Early life ==
In 1971, Li Yapeng was born in Shuimogou District, Ürümqi, Xinjiang. He has an elder brother, Li Yawei, who is 2 years older than him and is his business partner.

Li went to Ürümqi Bayi High School, Xinjiang and Hefei No. 8 High School, Anhui. In 1990, Li entered the Central Academy of Drama.

== Career ==
=== Acting ===
Li gained fame for his role in TV series Eternal Moment (1998), which established him as a romantic leading man. He is also known for his roles in wuxia dramas, such as Laughing in the Wind (2001) and The Legend of the Condor Heroes (2003). After the film Eternal Moment (2011), a sequel to his breakout TV series of the same name, he announced his retirement from acting, but occasionally appeared in variety and reality shows. Since 2021, Li has been a live streamer on Douyin, as part of his effort to pay off the debts.

=== Business ===
Li's investments cover film and television production, travel, publishing, catering, IT industry, real estate, etc. In May 2011, Li went into the Cheung Kong Graduate School of Business for EMBA courses.

Since 2015, Li has been struggling with a 40 million yuan ($5.5 million) debt stemming from real estate investments.

== Personal life ==
Li's high school sweetheart is Liu Yan, with whom he went to the interview of the Central Academy of Drama and both were admitted. They broke up in the freshman year. Liu dropped out and tested into the University of International Business and Economics to study accounting. She quit acting after her only film Yesterday's Wine (1995).

After becoming an actor, Li had relationships with host Ke Lan, model Qu Ying, and actress Zhou Xun, respectively, before he married singer Faye Wong in 2005. In May 2006, their daughter Li Yan aka Lyla (李嫣) was born with a cleft lip. In November 2006, the couple established a charity, the Smile Angel Foundation, to give assistance to other children with the condition. On September 13, 2013, Li and Wong announced their divorce.

In 2022, Li married former beauty queen Haiha Jinxi (海哈金喜). Their daughter, Li Xia (李夏), was born the same year. Haiha briefly participated in Li's livestreaming ventures as part of his debt repayment efforts. The couple divorced in 2025; their daughter resides with the mother and is jointly supported by both parents.

== In Filmography ==
- The Singer (1997)
- Laughing in the Wind (2001)
- Beach (2003)
- The Legend of the Condor Heroes (2003)
- The Royal Swordsmen (2005)
- Eternal Moment (2011)
