= Alai (author) =

Tibetan author (born 1959)

- 阿来; ཨ་ལེ
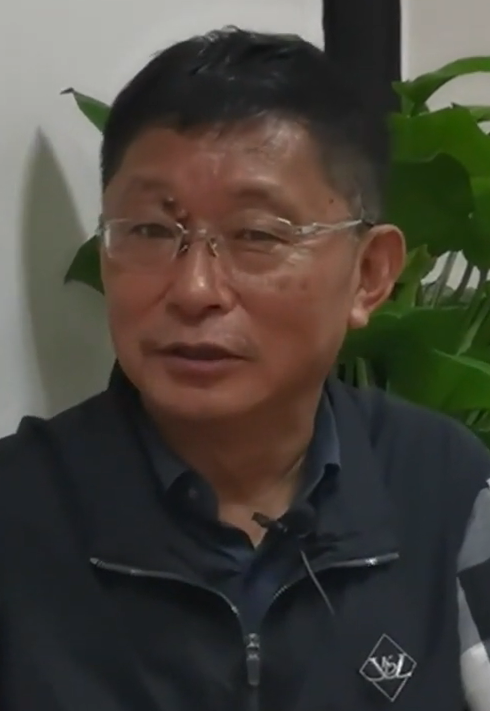
- Born: 1959 (age 66–67); Barkam, Ngawa Tibetan and Qiang Autonomous Prefecture, Sichuan
- Education: Normal College
- Occupations: Novelist, Poet
- Writing career
- Language: Chinese
- Period: 1982–present
- Genres: Novels, poetry
- Notable work: Red Poppies
- Notable awards: 5th Mao Dun Literary Prize; 2000 Red Poppies

Alai (Chinese: 阿来; pinyin: Ālái; Tibetan: ཨ་ལེ་, Wylie: a-le, ZWPY: Alê, Lhasa dialect: [ɑ́lè]; born 1959 in Sichuan Province) is a Chinese-language poet and novelist of Rgyalrong Tibetan descent. He is also a former editor of Science Fiction World.

== Works ==
Alai's notable novel Red Poppies, published in 1998, follows a family of Tibetan chieftains, the Maichi, during the decade or so before the "liberation" of Tibet by the People's Liberation Army in 1951. Their feudal life in the Tibetan borderlands, narrated by the youngest "idiot" son, is described as cruel, romantic, and full of intrigue (with the Annexation of Tibet by the People's Republic of China presented as a great advance for the Tibetan peasantry). Red Poppies won the 5th Mao Dun Literary Prize in 2000 and was selected as a finalist for the Kiriyama Prize in 2002.

In 2013, Alai participated in the International Writing Program's Fall Residency at the University of Iowa in Iowa City, IA.

== Bibliography ==
- The Song of King Gesar. Translated by Howard Goldblatt; Sylvia Li-chun Lin. New South Wales: Allen & Unwin. December 2013. ISBN 9781847672353.
- Tibetan Soul: Stories. Translated by Karen Gernant; Chen Zeping. Honolulu: University of Hawaii Press. February 2012. ISBN 978-1-937385-08-8.
- Red Poppies: A Novel of Tibet. Translated by Howard Goldblatt; Sylvia Li-chun Lin. Boston: Houghton Mifflin Harcourt. May 2003. ISBN 9780618340699.

== Filmography ==
- The Climbers (2019)
