= Qi Xin =

Mother of Xi Jinping (born 1926)

- 齊心
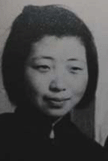
- Qi in the 1940s
- Born: 3 November 1926 (age 100); Kaoyang County, Hebei, Republic of China
- Education: Anti-Japanese Military and Political University
- Alma mater: Central Party School of the Chinese Communist Party
- Spouse: Xi Zhongxun (m. 1944; died 2002)
- Children: 4, including: Qi Qiaoqiao; Xi Jinping; Xi Yuanping
- Relatives: Xi family (by marriage)

Qi Xin (simplified Chinese: 齐心; traditional Chinese: 齊心; pinyin: Qí Xīn; born 3 November 1926) is a Chinese Communist revolutionary. She is the second wife of Xi Zhongxun and mother of Xi Jinping, current General Secretary of the Chinese Communist Party.

== Early life ==
Qi Xin was born in Gaoyang County, Hebei, on 3 November 1926. Her father, Qi Houzhi (齐厚之), was the head of the law bureau in the Nationalist government's Third Army during the Northern Expedition. Qi's mother, Deng Yaozhen, was the daughter of a Qing dynasty military official. The Deng family owned a pigment company and Deng Yaozhen used proceeds from the company to fund her children's political activity. In 1936, Qi Houzhi separated from Deng Yaozhen, married an actress, and stopped providing financial support for Qi Xin and her siblings. The next year, Deng, Qi Xin, and her younger brother moved to Gaoyang County in Hebei where they received financial support from Deng's siblings and Qi Houzhi's brother.

In 1938, during the Second Sino-Japanese War, Qi was attending a girls' middle school in Beiping, modern Beijing. After Beiping fell to the Japanese army, her elder sister Yun (Chinese: 云) took her to Tunliu County, Shanxi, where Yun joined the Eighth Route Army. Yun sent her little sister to the schoolgirls' team of the Anti-Japanese Military and Political University, which had set up a branch school in Tunliu.

Later in the winter of 1939, Qi transferred to the female cadre branch of the Cadres' School in Changzhi County, where she served as a team leader. She participated in fighting at Yincheng and Xihuo town. She narrowly survived an attack by artillery and cavalry.

Qi entered the Central Party School of the Chinese Communist Party in 1941, then was sent to Yan'an University's middle school in 1942. Qi became class president there.

== Career ==
Qi married Xi Zhongxun in April 1944, then after graduating from Suide Teachers' College later that year, Qi went to a rural village to do grassroots work with peasants. In fall 1946, she became vice-secretary of Yihe Township. Qi was based in Yan'an from 1949 to 1952, working as a researcher on agricultural issues for the Northwest Bureau.

In 1952, Qi moved with her husband to Beijing so that he could serve as head of the propaganda department. In 1953, Qi enrolled in the Marx School of Communism. After graduating, Qi continued work at the institute, which was located quite far from the family home and required her husband to look after their children. Qi visited provincial and county-level schools set-up by the communist government as a consultant. It has been suggested that this position provided her family with relatively good protection during the Cultural Revolution, when her husband was denounced, but not imprisoned. Qi was asked to accompany Xi to Luoyang in 1975, however, to look after him whilst he was still under investigation.

A documentary about Qi was made in 2001, detailing her revolutionary background, titled Loyal and Dependable——Qi Xin wife of Xi Zhongxun (Chinese: 忠贞——习仲勋的夫人齐心; pinyin: zhōngzhēn——Xí Zhòngxūn de fūren Qí Xīn). The piece also emphasised the education she has given her children and the high expectations she had of their work.

== Personal life ==
Qi met Xi Zhongxun in 1943 whilst studying at the middle school in Suide County. At the time, Xi was still married to his first wife, Hao Mingzhu (Chinese: 郝明珠), with whom he had three children. Later, the head of education at the Anti-Japanese Military and Political University wrote to Xi, introducing Qi Xin, after having met her sister and father. After sending Xi her own autobiographical introduction, the two married at the prefectural party office in Suide County on 28 April 1944. The couple had their first child in 1949, a daughter named Qiaoqiao (Chinese: 桥桥), followed by another daughter in 1952 named An'an (Chinese: 安安), and two sons named Jinping and Yuanping (Chinese: 远平). Following the births of each of her children, Qi only stayed at home until the baby was weaned before returning to her work. She came home at most once each week. The family led a frugal and austere lifestyle, not having shoes for the younger sons.

Qi's younger brother, Qi Bu (Chinese: 齊步) (also known as Qi Ruixin (Chinese: 齊銳新)) (d.1987), was vice party secretary of the China National Gold Group and a top official in the gold and mineral exploration arm of the People's Armed Police. CCP leader Xi Jinping considered him "very close".

Qi's nephew and first cousin to Xi Jinping, the son of Qi Bu, Chai Ming (Chinese: 齊明) was the chairman of Shenzhen ZTE Zhongxing Keyang Environmental Protection Co., Ltd. and director of GQY Video. Chai gained media attention for gambling US$39 million at Melbourne, Australia's Crown casino in one period of 18 months.

=== Family ===
- Xi Zhongxun (husband) (15 October 1913 – 24 May 2002)
  - Qi Qiaoqiao (b. 1 March 1949)
    - married Deng Jiagui (b. 1951)
  - Qi An'an (b. 1952)
    - married Wu Lung
  - Xi Jinping (b. 15 June 1953)
    - married and divorced Ke Lingling
    - married Peng Liyuan (b. 20 November 1962) and have one daughter, Xi Mingze (b. 25 June 1992)
  - Xi Yuanping (b. November 1956)
    - married Zhang Lanlan

== Written works ==
- Qi 齐, Xin 心 (2013). "习仲勋蒙冤十六年" [Xi Zhongsun has been wronged these past 16 years]. Dangjian Wenhui. Xiabanyue ban (in Chinese) (11): 48.
- Qi 齐, Xin 心 (14 December 2011). "我与习仲勋风雨相伴的55年" [55 years of accompanying each other through trials and hardships: Xi Zhongxun and I]. Laorenbao. A28 (in Chinese). Archived from the original on 29 May 2012.
