= Carol of Zhenguan =

- DVD cover art
- Also known as: The Story of Zhen Guan
- 贞观长歌
- Genre: Historical drama
- Written by: Zhou Zhifang
- Directed by: Wu Ziniu
- Presented by: Zhu Tong; Li Kangsheng; Chen Jianguo; Luo Shan
- Starring: Tang Guoqiang; Zhang Tielin; Chen Baoguo; Du Zhiguo; Wang Huichun; Cao Peichang; Liu Yubin; Nie Yuan; Zhang Lanlan; Dong Ziwu; Sun Feihu; Tan Feiling; Tu Men; Han Zaifen; Wan Hongjie
- Ending theme: "Carol of Zhenguan" (贞观长歌) by Zhang Lanlan
- Composer: Wang Liguang
- Country of origin: China
- Original language: Mandarin
- No. of episodes: 82

Production
- Producers: Chen Jianguo; Chen Jianping; Zhu Cheng; Luo Shan; Gao Chengsheng; Guo Yiquan
- Production locations: Hengdian World Studios; Zhuozhou; Yi County, Hebei; Inner Mongolia
- Running time: ≈45 minutes per episode
- Production companies: Emei Film Production Factory; China Central Television Cultural Arts Centre; Zhongwai Mingren Culture Property Corporation; Beijing Jinxiu Jiangshan Film Culture Broadcasting Company

Original release
- Network: CCTV-1
- Release: 27 January 2007

Carol of Zhenguan (贞观长歌) is a Chinese historical television series based on the events of the Zhenguan era (627–649) of the reign of Emperor Taizong of the Tang dynasty. Directed by Wu Ziniu, the 82-episode series starred Tang Guoqiang as Li Shimin (Emperor Taizong) and was first aired on CCTV-1 in mainland China in 2007.

== Synopsis ==
The series is set in seventh-century China during the early Tang dynasty. Li Shimin, the Prince of Qin, has assassinated his brothers Li Jiancheng, the Crown Prince, and Li Yuanji, the Prince of Qi, during the Xuanwu Gate Incident in 626, becoming the heir apparent to the throne. Two months later, following his father's death, he becomes emperor in Chang'an and changes the era name to "Zhenguan" to mark the start of his reign.

Shortly after his enthronement, Li Shimin has to deal with the aggressive Tujue under Jieli Khan in the north, while simultaneously facing the threat of rebellion from the general Luo Yi. Under Li Shimin's rule, China enters an unprecedented period of prosperity and stability. The Zhenguan era is also considered one of the golden ages in Chinese history.

== Cast ==
- Tang Guoqiang as Li Shimin (Emperor Taizong)
- Zhang Lanlan as Princess Ankang
- Nie Yuan as Li Ke
- Wan Hongjie as Li Chengqian
- Han Zaifen as Empress Zhangsun
- Wang Donghui as Li Tai
- Wen Hao as Li You
- Ma Yuke as Li Zhi
- Xi Yuli as Consort Yang
- Du Zhiguo as Hou Junji
- Cao Peichang as Zhangsun Wuji
- Wang Huichun as Cen Wenben
- Zhang Tielin as Luo Yi
- Chen Baoguo as Du Ruhui
- Liu Yubin as Fang Xuanling
- Dong Ziwu as Wei Zheng
- Sun Feihu as Feng Deyi
- Bi Haifeng as Li Jing
- Zhang Shan as Li Ji
- Zhang Naiwen as Chang He
- Li Qingxiang as Zhangsun Shunde
- Si Yuan as Ma Zhou
- Mou Fengbin as Chu Suiliang
- Hu Qingshi as Zhang Xuansu
- Bai Dezhang as Xiao Yu
- Wang Jiahe as Dugu Mou
- Wang Baojiang as Chai Zhewei
- Wang Zhengjia as Cheng Huailiang
- Zhang Xiqian as Zheng Renji
- Liu Haibo as Quan Wanji
- Zhang Hongming as Zhao Shida
- Chen Ganlin as Zhao Yuankai
- Tu Men as Jieli Khan
- Hong Yuzhou as Tuli Khan
- Liu Haitao as Shiluodie
- Li Peng as Yinan
- Zhou Guangzhen as Zhishisili
- Menghewuliji as Ashina Simo
- Qinaritu as Qibiheli
- Tan Feiling as Dou Yi
- Qi Xiaoxiao as Zheng Liwan
- Bai Qinglin as Ashina Yun
- Tiffany Tang as Caiji
- Rao Minli as Haitang
- Zong Fengyan as Min Guoqi
- Gao Chengsheng as Zhao Gongcun
- Liu Sha as Lüxiu
- Yan Jiansheng as Ma Xuanliang
- Zhu Hongjia as Chang Sheng
- Wu Qiang as Chi Deli
- Xu Jingyi as Dou Fu
- Zhang Danfeng as Mu Yikuan
- Ma Dong as Cui Xian
- Yang Hongtao as Wang De
- Guo Yongzhen as Botie
- Zhang Hao as Fan Xing
- Yu Yang as Henglian
- Sun Jie as Yuqing
- Deng Na as Ling'er

== Critical reception ==
On 28 January 2007, one day after Carol of Zhenguan premiered on CCTV-1, it received many negative criticisms online about issues ranging from the inaccuracies with the costumes and filming locations to inconsistencies with historical sources. On the same day, director Wu Ziniu responded in an interview that he believed that the negative criticisms were unfounded and intentionally created to reduce ratings because Carol of Zhenguan was competing for viewership with other similar television series such as The Rise of the Tang Empire. Wu said, "(This is) an 82-episode series. I suggest audiences finish watching it first before commenting."

Some of the criticisms were:

- The costumes do not resemble any Chinese historical style of dress, and the palace architecture is closer to the Han dynasty than the Tang dynasty. Wu Ziniu replied that he had consulted experts on the Tang dynasty for the costumes and props, and his consultants included the president of the Chinese Tang Dynasty History Research Association and seven history professors from Peking, Renmin, and Beijing Normal universities.
- Tang Guoqiang (then 53) was too old to portray Li Shimin because historically the emperor was 29 when he ascended the throne. Others pointed out that Zhang Tielin's Luo Yi was too overbearing and too similar to Zhang's better-known portrayal of the Qianlong Emperor in My Fair Princess. Wu Ziniu responded that the age problem had been automatically "corrected" when Li Shimin's eldest son Li Chengqian (who historically was a child when his father became emperor) was portrayed by Wan Hongjie as a young adult. Wu Ziniu also replied that since Luo Yi was a rebel general, it would not be unexpected of him to behave arrogantly.
- Even though Carol of Zhenguan was marketed as a historical television series, it was very similar to other gongting dramas focusing on themes of political intrigues and power struggles. Wu Ziniu felt that this criticism was ridiculous because only two episodes of Carol of Zhenguan had been aired at the time, so viewers would not have seen the "palace politics" parts yet. Wu admitted that Carol of Zhenguan has themes of war, action, conspiracy, romance, etc. found in many other gongting series, but the ones in Carol of Zhenguan are "artistic recreations" based on history, so this makes the series worth watching.
- Only one line about Princess Ankang (portrayed by Zhang Lanlan) was recorded in the New Book of Tang, yet the princess plays a significant role in the series. Wu Ziniu mentioned that he chose her from Li Shimin's many children because she was representative of princesses of the Zhenguan era. He also stated that he did not pick Princess Gaoyang, a better-known daughter of Li Shimin, because audiences are already quite familiar with her due to her illicit affair with the monk Bianji.
- Empress Zhangsun (portrayed by Han Zaifen) was described in historical texts as a virtuous and wise woman who was supportive of her husband. However, in the series, she is depicted as a jealous and petty wife, and a mother who overindulges her son Li Chengqian. Audiences find it hard to accept. Screenwriter Zhou Zhifang replied that he wanted Empress Zhangsun to be more realistic since it is natural for a wife to feel jealous when her husband loves another woman, and for a mother to unknowingly spoil her son when she showers too much care on him.

== See also ==
- The Rise of the Tang Empire
