= The Rise of the Tang Empire =

2006 Chinese television series

- DVD cover art
- Also known as: Control by Zhen Guan
- 贞观之治
- Genre: Historical drama
- Written by: Ah Cheng; Meng Xianshi
- Directed by: Zhang Jianya
- Starring: Ma Yue; Jin Shijie; Miao Pu; Ma Shaohua; Ma Jingwu; Lu Jianmin; Shen Mengsheng
- Opening theme: "Ideal Kingdom" (理想国) by Jacky Cheung
- Ending theme: "Mystery" (天机) by Jacky Cheung and Bai Lu
- Country of origin: China
- Original language: Mandarin
- No. of episodes: 50

Production
- Producer: Sun Ying
- Production location: China
- Cinematography: Zhi Lei
- Running time: ≈45 minutes per episode
- Production companies: China Film Group Corporation; Shanghai Media Group; Beijing Hualubaina Film & TV; China Film & Television Production

Original release
- Network: BTV
- Release: 2006

The Rise of the Tang Empire (贞观之治) is a Chinese historical television series based on the events of the Zhenguan era (627–649) of the reign of Emperor Taizong of the Tang dynasty. Directed by Zhang Jianya and written by Ah Cheng and Meng Xianshi, the series was first broadcast on BTV in China in December 2006.

== Cast ==
- Ma Yue as Li Shimin (Emperor Taizong)
- Chin Shih-chieh as Wei Zheng
- Ma Shaohua as Zhangsun Wuji
- Miao Pu as Empress Zhangsun
- Ma Jingwu as Li Yuan (Emperor Gaozu)
- Lu Jianmin as Li Jiancheng
- Shen Mengsheng as Li Yuanji
- Ge Zhijun as Pei Ji
- Sun Ning as Fang Xuanling
- Zhu Lei as Du Ruhui
- Wu Jian as Li Jing
- Lü Xing as Li Chengqian
- Wang Dongfang as Li Tai
- Hu Wenbao as Li Zhi
- Tao Feifei / Tao Rong as Princess Gaoyang
- Zhang Di as Wu Zetian
- Qi Qianjun as Zhang Jieyu
- Serina Liu as Pipa Lady
- Zhao Wanyi as Hong Fu Nü
- Sun Yifei as Princess Wencheng
- Li Jiayi as Consort Yang
- Tu Ling as Wei Zheng's wife
- Zhang Yang as Chengxin
- Zang Jinsheng as Dou Jiande
- Li Zhenqi as Wei Ting
- Yan Hongzhi as Tuli Khan
- Han Dong as Illig Qaghan
- Fan Xiaoyang as Xuanzang
- Chen Zhihui as Qin Shubao
- Jia Shitou as Cheng Yaojin
- Zheng Tianyong as Li Gang
- Deli Ge'er as Yuchi Gong
- Jia Lin as Li Wu
- Han Yingqun as Li Sixing
- Li Qi as Li Shiji
- Wang Rong as Hou Junji
- Liu Weiming as Chu Suiliang
- Cui Kefa as Gao Shilian
- Yu Bin as Xiao Yi
- Wang Xiuqiang as Wang Gui
- Hao Zi as Helan Chushi
- Ye Peng as Fang Yi'ai
- Ji Yao as Zhang Gongjin
- Ma Siqian as Attendant Liu
- Wang Xinmin as Ma Zhou
- Xiahou Bin as Li Chunfeng
- Ye Xiaojian as Xiao Yu
- Hong Zongyi as Zhangsun Anye
- Guo Hongjie as Zhishi Sili
- Zhang Shaorong as Qu Wentai
- Yang Junyong as Tang Jian
- Ji Chunjiang as Li Xiaochang
- Jiang Houli as Yuwen Shiji
- Guo Wenxue as Xunxiang
- Jia Yuntong as Feng Deyi
- Cui Yugui as Li Daliang
- Yao Jinfei as Qu Zhisheng
- Liu Jinsheng as Qu Zhizhan
- Ma Xiaoning as Zhao Deyan
- Guo Zhenming as Royal Father-in-law Zhang
- Wang Ming as Wang Shichong
- Sui Hui as Ashina Ju
- Xu Junben as Yin Longda
- Zhu Yuanhao as Wang Wan
- Zhao Yulin as Zhang Xuansu
- Li Ping as Cen Wenben
- Wang Yingqi as Liu Heita
- Nige Mutu as Xue Wanche
- Zhen Liqiang as Luo Yi
- Zhang Xinyue as an announcing official
- Meng Qingfan as an inspecting official
- Tong Zhongqi as Bianji

== See also ==
- Carol of Zhenguan
