= Xi family =

Prominent political family in China

Xi family 习氏家族
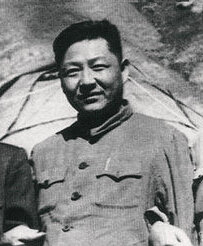
- Xi Zhongxun, founding patriarch of China's influential Xi family.
- Current region: Beijing, China
- Origin: China
- Founder: Xi Zhongxun
- Titles: List: General Secretary of the Chinese Communist Party; Chairman of the Central Military Commission; President of China
- Members: Xi Zhongxun; Xi Jinping; Qi Qiaoqiao; Xi Yuanping; Xi Zhengning; Xi Mingze
- Connected members: Qi Xin; Peng Liyuan

The Xi family is a prominent political Chinese family. The most well-known member is Xi Jinping, the general secretary of the Chinese Communist Party and leader of China since 2012. Other prominent members include Xi Jinping's father Xi Zhongxun, who played a significant role in the history of the People's Republic of China.

== Prominent members ==
=== Xi Yongsheng ===
Xi Yongsheng was Xi Zhongxun's grandfather as well as Xi Jinping's great-grandfather. Together with a woman surnamed Zhang, he fled from economic hardship in Dengzhou, Henan in the 1880s. He worked as an itinerant peddler. After going to a trip 13 kilometers away to find food for his family, Xi died next of a road near a Buddhist temple close to Fuping. Local people placed him to a nearby gorge, and he was eventually buried at home in 1958. His oldest son, Tiger, joined the army, while his second son, Zongde, remained at home to look for the family.

=== Xi Zongde ===
Xi Zongde (Chinese: 习宗德) was the father of Xi Zhongxun, as well as the grandfather of Xi Jinping. He was married to Chai Caihua (Chinese: 柴菜花). He died shortly after Xi Zhongxun was released from prison.

=== Xi Zhongxun ===
Xi Zhongxun (1913–2002) was a Chinese Communist revolutionary and politician who played a significant role in the history of the People's Republic of China. He served as the first Secretary-General of the State Council from 1954 to 1965, Vice Premier of the State Council from 1959 to 1965, Party Secretary of Guangdong from 1978 to 1980, and Vice Chairman of the Standing Committee of the National People's Congress from 1980 to 1983 and again from 1988 to 1993. He was a member of the influential Eight Elders in the 1980s.

=== Qi Xin ===
Qi Xin married Xi Zhongxun in April 1944, then after graduating from Suide Teachers' College later that year, Qi went to a rural village to do grassroots work with peasants. They moved to Beijing in 1952.

== Wives ==
=== Ke Lingling ===
Ke Lingling, the daughter of Ke Hua, China's ambassador to the United Kingdom in the early 1980s, married Xi Jinping in 1979. However, their life philosophy differed. Ke wanted to move to the UK, where her father served as ambassador, but Xi refused to accompany her. The two were said to fight "almost every day". In 1982, they divorced, ending three years of marriage; they had no children. After they divorced, Ke immigrated to the UK.

=== Peng Liyuan ===
Peng Liyuan, a prominent Chinese folk singer, and Xi were introduced by friends as many Chinese couples were in the 1980s. Xi was reputedly academic during their courtship, inquiring about singing techniques. Peng Liyuan, a household name in China, was better known to the public than Xi until his political elevation. The couple frequently lived apart due largely to their separate professional lives. Peng has played a much more visible role as China's "first lady" compared to her predecessors.

== Siblings ==
=== Xi Heping ===
Xi Heping, Xi Jinping's sister, committed suicide during the Cultural Revolution by hanging herself at her military academy. .

=== Xi Zhengning ===
Xi Zhengning was the elder brother of Xi Jinping. He served Director of the Department of Justice of Hainan Province and the Secretary of the Political and Legal Committee of the Hainan Provincial Committee. He died of a sudden heart attack on November 27, 1998, at the age of 57.

=== Qi Qiaoqiao ===
Qi Qiaoqiao is a Chinese businesswoman, former civil official, and elder sister to Xi Jinping. Qi was born in Yan'an in 1949. In 1962, Qi entered Hebei Beijing Middle School, which had been one of the few middle schools to participate in the student protests of 1935 that demanded the Nationalist government actively resist the invading Japanese army. Qi enrolled in the Foreign Affairs College. After graduation, Qi worked for the police as deputy director of the General Office and director of the Foreign Affairs Bureau.

=== Xi Yuanping ===
Xi Yuanping is the younger brother of Xi Jinping. He previously served as the president of the International Energy Conservation and Environmental Protection Association.

== Children ==
=== Xi Mingze ===
Xi Mingze is the daughter and only child of Xi Jinping and Peng Liyuan. Xi Mingze keeps a low profile, and not much of her personal information has been revealed to the public. She studied French at her high school, Hangzhou Foreign Languages School, from 2006 to 2008. Xi Mingze enrolled in Harvard University in the United States in 2010, after a year of undergraduate study at Zhejiang University. In 2014, she graduated from Harvard University with a Bachelor of Arts degree in psychology and was thought to have returned to Beijing.

=== Qi Ming ===
Qi Ming, also known as Ming Chai, is the nephew of Qi Xin, as well as the cousin of Xi Jinping. An Australian citizen, he is known for his high-stakes gambling and business relationships with gambling and brothel operators in Australia. According to The New York Times, there is "no evidence or suggestion that Mr. Xi had any knowledge of or involvement with any of Mr. Chai’s activities".

== Other relatives ==
=== Zhang Yannan ===
Zhang Yannan is the niece of Xi Jinping, and the daughter of Qi Qiaoqiao.

== Business dealings ==
In June 2012, Bloomberg News reported that members of Xi's extended family have substantial business interests, although there was no evidence he had intervened to assist them. It is estimated that by 2012, the Xi family had a fortune of over $US1 billion, mainly owned by his sister Qi Qiaoqiao and her husband and acquired in the sectors that often involved the government, such as a $US310 million stake in Jiangxi Rare Earth. The Bloomberg News website was blocked in mainland China in response to the article about his family's wealth. Relatives of highly placed Chinese officials, including seven current and former senior leaders of the Politburo of the CCP, have been named in the Panama Papers, including Deng Jiagui, Xi's brother-in-law. Deng had two shell companies in the British Virgin Islands while Xi was a member of the Politburo Standing Committee, which became dormant by the time Xi became general secretary of the CCP in November 2012. According to The New York Times in 2014, after coming to power, Xi told his family to get out of their investments and that Qi Qiaoqiao and Deng Jiagui had divested their investments in at least 10 companies.
