= Yuanping (disambiguation) =

Yuanping is a city in Shanxi, China.

Yuanping or Yuan Ping may also refer to:

- Yuanping era (74 BC), era name of the Emperor Zhao of Han
- Yuan Ping (swimmer), holder of a Taiwanese record in swimming
- Yuan Ping (physicist), Chinese-American laser-induced fusion scientist
- Xi Yuanping (born 1956), brother of Xi Jinping
