= Love Legend of the Tang Dynasty =

- DVD cover art
- Also known as: Da Tang Qing Shi
- Chinese: 大唐情史
- Hanyu Pinyin: Dà Táng Qíng Shǐ
- Genre: Historical fiction, costume drama, romance
- Written by: Yang Jie
- Directed by: Gong Ruofei
- Starring: Tang Guoqiang; Shen Aojun; Nie Yuan; Zhang Tong; Pan Yueming; Pan Yaowu; Qin Lan
- Country of origin: China
- Original language: Mandarin
- No. of episodes: 30

Production
- Production location: China
- Running time: 45 minutes per episode

Love Legend of the Tang Dynasty, also known as Da Tang Qing Shi, is a Chinese historical television series based on the legend of an illicit romance between the Tang dynasty Princess Gaoyang and a monk called Bianji. The series was directed by Gong Ruofei, starring Tang Guoqiang, Shen Aojun, Nie Yuan, Zhang Tong, Pan Yueming, Pan Yaowu, and Qin Lan. It was first broadcast in mainland China in 2001.

== Plot ==
This story is set during the Tang dynasty, during the reign of Emperor Taizong of Tang.

Princess Gaoyang is the daughter of Lady Dai and the Emperor. She is the Emperor's favorite daughter and was spoiled with several servants and attendants. Yet, she falls for a monk named Bianji, but their relationship is fated. He is a lowly monk whose life purpose is to abstain from romance, and she is a princess of high status. Despite her engagement to a rich noble named Fang Yi'ai, their affair persists in secret.

Meanwhile, Emperor Taizong deals with politics and the women in his harem. He is deeply in love with Lady Dai, the mother of Princess Gaoyang. He cares for Empress Zhangsun. He also favors Consort Yang and Consort Yin. The consorts all plot against each other to win his affections. One day, a young maiden named Meiniang enters his palace.

== Cast ==
- Tang Guoqiang as Emperor Taizong of Tang
- Shen Aojun as Princess Gaoyang
  - Xie Yue as young Princess Gaoyang
- Nie Yuan as Bianji
  - Xu Boping as teenage Bianji
  - Yin Yifan as child Bianji
- Pan Yueming as Fang Yi'ai
- Zhao Qian as Empress Zhangsun
- Zhang Tong as Lady Dai
- Yan Danchen as Consort Yang
- Shen Rong as Consort Yin
- Yue Yueli as Fang Xuanling
- Zhuang Li as Fang Xuanling's wife
- Ma Xiaowei as Fang Yizhi
- Xu Songyuan as Wei Zheng
- Feng Guoqiang as Zhangsun Wuji
- Xu Shaohua as Xuanzang
- He Xianda as Emperor Wen of Sui
- Wang Pin as Hou Junji
- Gao Liang as Li Daozong
- Zhang Shan as General Zong
- Han Zhenhua as Yan Liben
- Lu Yong as Gar Tongtsen Yülsung (Lu Dongzan)
- Zhang Shihui as Li Jiancheng
- Liu Haibo as Li Yuanji
- Zhong Cheng as Li Chengqian
  - Chen Guanze as Li Chengqian (young)
- Pan Yaowu as Li Ke
  - Li Tong as Li Ke (young)
- Yuan Shilong as Li Tai
- Liu E as Li You
- Huo Yaming as Li Zhi
  - Ma Ke as Li Zhi (young)
- Qin Lan as Wu Meiniang
- Ye Xiaomin as Princess Wencheng
- Liu Jingcheng as Li Anyan
- Li Xin as Chengxin
- Zheng Ruhao as Li Chunfeng
- Li Shuming as Li Junyi
- Yin Xiaotian as Zhangsun Qian'er
- Wu Jing as Miss Bai
- Ding Kai as Shujie
- Gai Yi as Jingnu
- Zhao Erling as Fuyou
- Lu Ye as Old Man Fu
