= Chen Baoguo =

Chinese actor

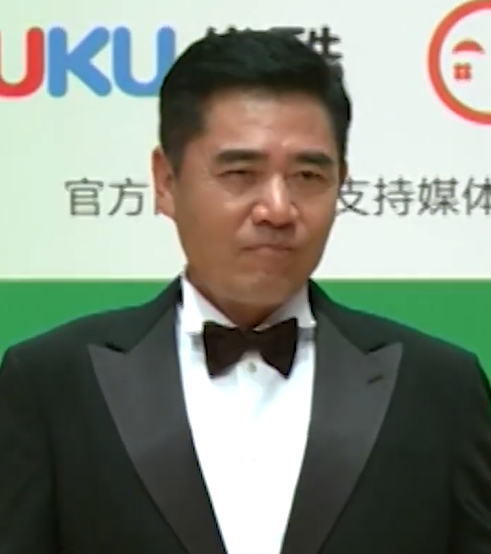
- Chen in 2020
- Born: 9 March 1956 (age 70); Beijing, China
- Education: Central Academy of Drama
- Occupation: Actor
- Years active: 1979–present
- Spouse: Zhao Kui'e

Chinese name
- Traditional Chinese: 陳寶國
- Simplified Chinese: 陈宝国
Transcriptions
Standard Mandarin
- Hanyu Pinyin: Chén Bǎoguó

Chen Baoguo (Chinese: 陈宝国; born 9 March 1956) is a Chinese actor, President of the China Film Performance Society (CFPS) and a Chairman of China TV Artists Association (CTAA) Actor's Committee. He graduated from the Central Academy of Drama in 1977 and has since acted in many films and television series, including The Emperor in Han Dynasty, Da Zhai Men and Rob-B-Hood. He is married to actress Zhao Kui'e (赵奎娥). In 2020, he became the first Chinese actor to win a two-round "Grand Slam", after winning the "Best Actor" award at least twice at the Feitian Award, the Golden Eagle Award and the Magnolia Award.

== Filmography ==
=== Stage plays ===
Year	Title	Role	Notes
1979	Baotong 报童	Reporter	
1981	Pavel Korchagin 保尔·柯察金	Pavel Korchagin	
1984	Rensheng Diyi Yuezhang 人生第一乐章	Jiang Nanfeng	
1986	Richard III 理查三世	Richard III	

=== Films ===
Year	Title	Role	Notes
1981	Da Duhe 大渡河	Zhao Jianfeng	
1981	Yougu Liange 幽谷恋歌	Teluo	
1982	Liao Zhongkai 廖仲恺	Zheng Jian	
1983	Yilu Shunfeng 一路顺风	An Dele	
1984	Momo De Xiaoli He 默默的小理河	Military officer	
1986	The Magic Braid 神鞭	Bolihua	
1987	Tianshi Yu Mogui 天使与魔鬼	Zheng Tian	
1988	Zanhuan Daibu 暂缓逮捕	Xiao Yuguang	
1989	Yedao Zhenfei Mu 夜盗珍妃墓	E Shichen	
1989	Shang Jie 商界	Liao Zuquan	
1990	Peking Duck Restaurant 老店	Yang Mingquan	
1992	Woman's Drug Rehabilitation Centre 女子戒毒所	Zhang Guowen	
1993	Manzhou Hu Xingdong 满洲虎行动	Lin Feihu	
1993	Jue Sha 绝杀	Ding Mang	
1994	Zishou De Ai 自首的爱	Xiao Jian	
1994	Hongchen 红尘	Ma Sansheng	
1995	Ranshao De Yuwang 燃烧的欲望	Xiao Keji	
1996	Haohan Bu Huitou 好汉不回头	Lü Jianguo	
1999	Team Spirit 女帅男兵	Zhang Ting	guest star
2007	Rob-B-Hood 宝贝计划	Triad boss	
2009	The Founding of a Republic 建国大业	Zhou Zhirou	
2014	The Galaxy on Earth 天河		

=== Television ===
Year	Title	Role	Notes
1982	Colours of the Rainbow 赤橙黄绿青蓝紫	Liu Sijia	
1984	Sheng Dang Zuo Renjie 生当做人杰		
1992	Wei, Feiyate 喂，菲亚特	Ding Zhifang	
1992	The Beiyang Fleet 北洋水师	Deng Shichang	
1993	Jue Sha 绝杀	Ding Mang	
1994	Huo Kou 豁口	Wang Rucheng	alternate title Yin Ying (阴影)
1995	Shimen Qingbao Zhan 石门情报站	Han Feng	alternate title Jue Mi 203 (绝密203)
1995	Qinglou Yuanmeng 青楼鸳梦	Qin Bingque	guest star; alternate title Mengduan Qinglou (梦断情楼)
1995	Wu Zetian 武则天	Emperor Gaozong of Tang	
1995	Zhongguo Kongjie 中国空姐	Captain of Flight 747	
1995	Da Fandian Xiao Renwu 大饭店小人物	Shenmi Dashi	
1995	Meiyou Guoji De Nüren 没有国籍的女人	Lei Dake	
1995	Zan Ba Zan Ma 咱爸咱妈	Qiao Jiawei	
1995	Beijing Shenqiu De Gushi 北京深秋的故事	Xiao Keji	
1996	Qingchun Zhi Ge 青春之歌	Yu Yongze	
1996	Xiao Jing Hu Tong 小井胡同	Zha Zongyou	
1996	Duonao He Shang De Huang Taiyang 多瑙河上的黄太阳		
1997	Qing Ni Yuanliang Wo 请你原谅我	Qin Wenxu	
1997	Lijing Pandao Yikan Shousuo De Gushi 离经叛道—看守所的故事	Fu Jimin	
1997	Yanqing Suiyue 言情岁月		
1997	Juesha Jinghun 48 Xiaoshi 绝杀惊魂48小时		guest star
1997	Wuxue De Dongtian 无雪的冬天	Chen Daping	
1997	Hongyan 红岩	Xu Pengfei	
1998	Huochu Yige Moyang Gei Ni Kan 活出个模样给你看	Hou San'er	
1998	Nü Xun An 女巡按	Zhao Wen	guest star
1998	Da Shangchang 大商场	Policeman	guest star
1999	Heise De Meng 黑色的梦	Zhou Wenchang	alternate titles Gushi Rensheng (股市人生) and Juedui Daji (绝对打击)
1999	Mulan Xinbian 木兰新编	Emperor Wen of Sui	
1999	Laobing Jiuba 老兵酒吧	Li Hao	alternate title Nan'er Bense (男儿本色)
1999	Zuizheng 罪证	Luo Peishi	
1999	Xinwen Xiaojie 新闻小姐	Wu Jiajun	
2000	Yishou Tuo Erjia 一手托两家	Yue Wenxing	
2000	Kuaizhui Li Cuilian 快嘴李翠莲	Magistrate	guest star
2000	Feichang Anjian Zhi Siwang Youxi 非常案件之死亡游戏	Han Yuebai's father	guest star
2000	Nüren Zhi Jia 女人之家	Oldest son-in-law	guest star
2000	The Grand Mansion Gate 大宅门	Bai Jingqi	
2001	Fang Ai Yitiao Shenglu 放爱一条生路	Ding Song	alternate titles Meili De Jinbian Yishang (美丽的金边衣裳) and Touqing Xianjing (偷情陷阱)
2001	Longzhu Fengbao 龙珠风暴	Di Renjie	
2001	Hua Fei Hua 花非花	Sima Ke	
2001	Yuwang De Xuanwo 欲望的漩涡		guest star
2002	Ai Dao Jintou 爱到尽头	Xu Guoquan	alternate title Buke Raoshu (不可饶恕)
2002	Yuanze 原则	Wei Changxing	alternate title Jin Guo (禁果)
2002	Chen Zhen 陈真后传	Wei Tianba	
2002	Aiqing Ziwei 爱情滋味	No. 10	
2002	Dangyuan Ma Dajie 党员马大姐		guest star
2002	Dapo Chenmo 打破沉默	Zhao Changhui	
2002	Gong'an Juzhang 公安局长	Li Xidong	
2002	Tiemian Wusi 铁面无私	Fang Jie / Fang Ming	
2002	Da Zhai Men 2 大宅门2	Bai Jingqi	
2002	The Emperor in Han Dynasty 汉武大帝	Emperor Wu of Han	
2003	Lüshi De Shiming 律师的使命	Sima Wencheng	
2003	Xinteng Nüren 心疼女人	Wu Jingwei	
2003	Shuxiang Mendi 书香门第		guest star
2003	Shenbu Shisan Niang 神捕十三娘	Xiao Daheng	
2003	Doukou Nianhua 豆蔻年华	Inspector	guest star; alternate title Yinse Nianhua (银色年华)
2003	Nü Xun An Zhi Zhenjia Gongzhu 女巡按之真假公主	Zhao Wen	guest star
2003	Yishan Daohai Fan Lihua 移山倒海樊梨花	Li Shimin	guest star
2003	Ban Ge Yueliang 半个月亮	Wang Luning	
2003	Pingzong Xiaying 萍踪侠影	Yunjing	guest star
2003	Da E Wuxing 大鳄无形	Yang Mingguang	guest star
2003	The Affaire in the Swing Age 江山风雨情	Zhu Youlang, Prince of Gui	
2004	Bielian Zai Taxiang 别恋在他乡	Lin Yifan	alternate title Shi Bu Liang Li (势不两立)
2004	Lanse Yinmou 蓝色阴谋	Wen Siqi	alternate title Tian Zhi Jiao (天之骄)
2004	Tanguan Beihou De Nüren 贪官背后的女人	Zhang Jianguo	alternate title Hong Ying Su (红罂粟)
2004	Tianxia Diyi Lou 天下第一楼	Wu Peifu	guest star
2004	Huang Taihou Mishi 皇太后秘史	Xianfeng Emperor	
2004	Xuese Langman 血色浪漫	Zhou Zhennan	guest star; alternate title Langman Rensheng (浪漫人生)
2004	Lingyun Zhuangzhi Bao Qingtian 凌云壮志包青天	Eighth Prince	alternate title Jianlin Tianxia (剑临天下)
2004	Bage Zhengzhuan 巴哥正传		guest star
2004	Taohua Yuan Ji 桃花源记	Qin Shi Huang	guest star
2004	Chuanqi Huangdi Zhu Yuanzhang 传奇皇帝朱元璋	Zhu Yuanzhang	
2004	Moment in Peking 京华烟云	Yao Si'an	
2004	Sigh of His Highness 一生为奴	Prince Gong	
2005	Carol of Zhenguan 贞观长歌	Du Ruhui	
2005	The Rebirth of a King 越王勾践	King Goujian of Yue	
2005	Sha Jia Bing 沙家浜		guest star
2005	Jing Su 惊悚	Wang Rucheng	
2005	Daqing Xiyuan Lu 大清洗冤录	Qianlong Emperor	
2006	Lieri Yanyan 烈日炎炎	Luo	
2006	The Prince's Education 上书房	Yiqing	
2006	Kangxi Weifu Sifang Ji 5 康熙微服私访记5		guest star
2006	Ming Dynasty in 1566 大明王朝1566	Jiajing Emperor	
2007	Diezhan Gu Shantang 谍战古山塘	Master Yu	
2007	Nüren Lei / Diezhan Kuanghua 女人泪 / 谍战狂花	Li Zhongmou	
2007	Chaguan 茶馆	Wang Lifa	
2008	Zhenhan Shijie De Qi Ri 震撼世界的七日	Shen Bonan	
2008	Zi Ye 子夜	Zhao Botao	
2008	Qiong Baba Fu Baba 穷爸爸富爸爸	Wang Fugui	
2008	Diwang Zhi Lü 帝王之旅	Zhu Biao	guest star
2009	Yongzhe Wudi 勇者无敌	Zhou Saofeng	
2009	Juezhan Nanjing 决战南京	Qin Shiguan	
2009	Heiyu / Yuba 黑狱 / 狱霸		
2010	Zhizhe Wudi 智者无敌	Zhongcun Gong	
2010	Bing Shi Shuizhao De Shui 冰是睡着的水	Lin	guest star
2010	Gangtie Niandai 钢铁年代	Shang Tielong	
2010	Hufu Chuanqi 虎符传奇	King of Wei	
2011	Zhengzhe Wudi 正者无敌	Feng Tiankui	
2011	Dihou Bianyi Dui 敌后便衣队		guest star
2011	Guangrong Dadi 光荣大地		
2011	Wangzhe Fengfan 王者风范		
2014	All Quiet in Peking 北平无战事	Xu Tieying	
2019	Laozhongyi 老中医	Weng Quanhai	
TBA	The Imperial Age	Hongwu Emperor	

=== Video games ===
Year	Title	Role	Notes
1994	Storybook Weaver	The Ruckus	Chinese voice
2004	Storybook Weaver Deluxe	The Ruckus	Chinese voice

== Awards and nominations ==
Year	Award / Nomination	Representative work	Notes	Ref.
1983	Golden Eagle Award for Best Actor	Colours of the Rainbow		
1991	Nomination for Golden Rooster Award for Best Actor	Peking Duck Restaurant	Film won Hundred Flowers Award for Best Picture	
1991	China Film and Performing Arts Society Golden Phoenix Award 中国电影表演艺术学会奖金凤凰奖			
2001	Annual CCTV Prime Time Audience's Favourite Actor Award 年度中央电视台黄金时间观众最喜爱的优秀电视剧演员			
2003	Golden Eagle Award for Favourite Actor			
2005	Flying Goddess Award for Best Actor 飞天奖优秀男演员奖	The Emperor in Han Dynasty		
2005	Fifth "Public Television" China Television Arts Best Ten Actors Award 第五届《大众电视》中国电视艺术双十佳演员			
2005	Best Actor Award 最佳男主演	The Emperor Han Wu	based on a survey conducted by Beijing Youth Paper (北京青年报) and viewership ratings of The Emperor Han Wu	
2005	Best Actor Award 最佳男主演	Moment in Peking	based on a survey conducted by Beijing Youth Paper (北京青年报) and viewership ratings of Moment in Peking	
2005	Best 100 Chinese Television Actors in 100 Years (1976-2004) 中国电影百年百位优秀演员（1976—2004）			
2011	Flying Goddess Award for Best Actor 第28届中国电视剧飞天奖优秀男演员奖	Gangtie Niandai		
2019	26th Huading Awards	Best Actor	The Legendary Tavern	
2019	26th Huading Awards	Top Ten Favorite Actors	The Legendary Tavern	
2019	Film and TV Role Model 2019 Ranking	Best Actor	The Legendary Tavern	
