= Xi Zhengning =

Chinese politician, half-brother of Xi Jiping (1941–1998)

Personal details
- Born: 1941 Shanxi, China
- Died: November 27, 1998 (aged 56–57)
- Party: Chinese Communist Party
- Parent(s): Xi Zhongxun; Hao Mingzhu
- Relatives: Xi family

Xi Zhengning (Chinese: 习正宁; 1941–November 27, 1998), formerly known as Xi Fuping (Chinese: 习富平), was a political figure in China. He served as the Director of the Department of Justice of Hainan Province and the Secretary of the Political and Legal Committee of the Hainan Provincial Committee. He was the eldest son of Xi Zhongxun and the half-brother of Xi Jinping and Xi Yuanping.

== Biography ==
Xi graduated from Beijing No. 101 Middle School in 1960. A student majoring in Automatic Control, Department 6, 1960, University of Science and Technology of China.

In 1984, he served as the director of the Youth Cadre Division of the Organization Department of the Shaanxi Provincial Party Committee, mainly responsible for the training and assessment of young cadres. In 1986, he served as the deputy director of the Organization Department of the Shaanxi Provincial Party Committee. In 1987, he successively served as Director of the Hainan Provincial Department of Justice and Secretary of the Hainan Provincial Political and Legal Affairs Commission.

He died of a heart attack on November 27, 1998, at the age of 57.
