= Fang Yi'ai =

Tang dynasty politician (died 653)

- Prince consort
- Born: Qizhou
- Died: 6 March 653
- Spouse: Princess Gaoyang
- Father: Fang Xuanling
- Mother: Lady Lu

Fang Yi'ai (Chinese: 房遺愛; ? – 6 March 653), was a Tang dynasty politician who served as the governor of Fangzhou. He was the second son of Fang Xuanling, a prominent statesman who served as chancellor under Emperor Taizong. Fang Yi'ai was married to Princess Gaoyang, the 17th daughter of Emperor Taizong.

== Life and career ==
=== Early life and marriage ===
Fang Yi'ai was a native of Qizhou, but his exact birth date is unknown, but it is believed to be sometime in the early 7th century. He was born into a prominent family, as his father, Fang Xuanling, was a highly respected official in the Tang court. Fang Yi'ai did not receive a well-rounded education but was skilled in martial arts.

In 648 CE, Fang Yi'ai was married to Princess Gaoyang, the 17th daughter of Emperor Taizong. The marriage between Fang Yi'ai and Princess Gaoyang was arranged by Emperor Taizong after the execution of Princess Gaoyang's alleged lover, a monk named Bianji. According to the New Book of Tang Gaoyang became bitter after Bianji's death, and her betrothal and wedding went ahead despite her protests. However, instead of animosity and resentment, Gaoyang and Fang Yi'ai grew closer and bonded over their mutual hatred for the imperial court.

=== Government positions and rebellion ===
After his marriage, Fang Yi'ai was appointed to a number of government positions. He served as a right-guard general and later as the governor of Fangzhou. In 653 CE, Fang Yi'ai was involved in a failed rebellion against Emperor Gaozong of Tang. The rebellion was orchestrated by his wife, Princess Gaoyang. However, the rebellion was swiftly suppressed, leading to Fang Yi'ai's death. Subsequently, Princess Gaoyang committed suicide upon the orders of her brother, Emperor Gaozong.

Xu Jingzong, a Tang dynasty historian, later commented on Fang Yi'ai's rebellion in the Old Book of Tang, stating, "Fang Yi'ai is still a child at the breast, how could he conspire with women to rebel?".

Cai Dongfan, a late Qing dynasty historian, commented on Fang Yi'ai's actions, stating, "When discussing the princess's wrongdoing, Fang Yi'ai is the main subject. If Fang Yi'ai had been diligent in preventing idleness, how could the princess dare to indulge in wanton behavior? Even if a wife commits adultery, the husband bears the blame according to the laws." The author traced the origin of the disaster to and Fang Yi'ai. This critique was not intended to excuse the princess, but to highlight the corruption of women and the lack of moral principles in men, both of which are seen as causes of national downfall and family ruin.

== Personal life ==
Fang Yi'ai had a great-grandson named Fang Jiang, who had two sons, Fang Hui and Fang Xun. Fang Hui had a son named Fang Ning, whose courtesy name was Xuanjian, and who served as the governor of Yingzhou. Fang Xun had a son named Fang Kerang, who had two sons, Fang Ye and Fang Fu. Fang Ye's courtesy name was Zhengfeng. Fang Yi'ai's grandson, Fang Nu, later became an imperial censor.

== In popular culture ==
- Portrayed by Pan Yueming in the 2001 Chinese TV series Love Legend of the Tang Dynasty
- Portrayed by Ye Peng in the 2006 Chinese TV series The Rise of the Tang Empire
- Portrayed by Lou Yajiang in the 2014 Chinese TV series Heroes of Sui and Tang Dynasties
- Portrayed by Zhu Xiaohui in the 2014 Chinese TV series The Empress of China
