= Meng Xianshi =

Chinese historian (born 1962)

Meng Xianshi 孟宪实
- Born: 1962 (age 63–64); Nehe, Heilongjiang
- Citizenship: China
- Education: Nankai University; Beijing University
- Scientific career
- Fields: History
- Workplaces: Renmin University of China

Meng Xianshi (Chinese: 孟宪实; pinyin: Mèng Xiànshí; born 1962) is a Chinese historian specialized in the history of Sui and Tang dynasties, an associate professor at Renmin University of China.

== Biography ==
Meng Xianshi was born in Nehe, Heilongjiang. He received his BA degree from Nankai University in 1983 and PhD degree from Beijing University in 2001. He joined the faculty of Renmin University of China in 2002.

Meng Xianshi gave lectures on Xuanwu Gate Incident (玄武门之变) on Lecture Room, a popular TV program on CCTV-10 in December 2006. He is also a main editor of The Rise of the Tang Empire, a TV series.

In his speech in Beijing Foreign Studies University in 2010, he claimed that "Esperanto was created in the 1980s", which exposed his lack of academic preciseness.

In 2018, Xianshi acted as a historical consultant on the then-upcoming manhua Assassin's Creed: Dynasty that was being set during the Tang dynasty. He worked closely with the creative team, and writers Xu Xianzhe and Zhang Xiao to ensure their work looked historically accurate.
