= Qi Qiaoqiao =

Daughter of Xi Zhongxun

- 齐桥桥
- Born: 1 March 1949 (age 77); Yan'an, Shaanxi, Liberated Zone, China
- Other name: Qi Lianxin (齐莲馨)
- Occupation: Businessperson
- Organization: Qinchuan Dadi Investment Limited
- Board member of: Chairperson of the Zhongminxin Real Estate Development Company
- Spouse: Deng Jiagui
- Children: 1
- Parents: Xi Zhongxun (father); Qi Xin (mother)
- Relatives: Xi family

Qi Qiaoqiao (born 1 March 1949; Chinese: 齐桥桥; pinyin: Qí Qiáoqiáo) is a Chinese businesswoman, former civil official, and elder sister to Xi Jinping, current Chinese Communist Party general secretary and Paramount leader of China.

== Early life and education ==
Qi was born in Yan'an in 1949 to Qi Xin, the second wife of Communist elder, Xi Zhongxun. At the age of three, Qi moved with her family to Beijing, where she was entered into the kindergarten at Beihai north of the Forbidden City.

In 1962, Qi entered Hebei Beijing Middle School (河北北京中学), which had been one of the few middle schools to participate in the student protests of 1935 that demanded the Nationalist government actively resist the invading Japanese army. When she enrolled, her father insisted that she be registered under her mother's surname, Qi. He also paid for her to board at the school throughout the week. As the daughter of a revolutionary family, Qi was made a member of her school's communist party and served as secretary for her class' communist party. During this time, she contracted tuberculosis; the disease that killed both her paternal grandparents. Qi recovered after three months, however, and passed her junior year exams.

=== Cultural Revolution ===
In late 1962, her father Xi Zhongxun was denounced and Qi and her siblings were branded 'children of a criminal' (黑帮子弟). Qi was made to attend a special class at school to educate her on the principles of Marxism, along with the children of other disgraced officials and difficult students. When her mother returned home one day having been beaten, Qi also consoled her siblings.

In 1969, after the government started the Down to the Countryside Movement, Qi was officially excluded from joining the army, but managed to persuade the recruitment agency for the Inner Mongolia branch to allow her to join them. She was assigned to a rural team near Tongliao city, where she stayed for over six years. Along with the other labourers, Qi was paid 5 Yuan per 10 days for constructing ditches and irrigation systems. Qi later stated that dysentery was so common that it was almost like the common cold. Once, when she was running a fever, Qi was sent to collect water and nearly fainted into the pit. She was later transferred to another team near Tongliao.

In February 1978, Qi's father was politically rehabilitated and he was sent to work in Guangdong; Qi accompanied him as his secretary. While there, Qi attended the First Military Medical University, but she suspended her studies for health reasons. On her recovery, Qi worked in the Military Communications Bureau of Guangzhou, where she was responsible for repatriating Vietnamese female prisoners of war from the 1979 Sino-Vietnamese War. When her father returned to Beijing, Qi went with him and enrolled in the Foreign Affairs College.

== Career ==
After graduation, Qi worked for the police as deputy director of the General Office and director of the Foreign Affairs Bureau.

In 2002, Qi Xin advised her daughter to seek employment after the death of her father. Though Qi argued that, being 50, she was close to retirement, she enrolled in an EMBA course at Tsinghua University in 2004. Qi set up the company Qinchuan Dadi Investment Limited (秦川大地投资有限公司) in 2007, along with her husband Deng Jiagui. The company predominantly invests in the mining sector and real estate.

In 2014, multiple news agencies reported that Xi Jinping, Qi's brother and newly the Chinese leader, had instructed her to sell her assets and withdraw from the business world.

== Businesses ==
In addition to Qinchuan Dadi Investment Limited, Qi co-owns Shenzhen Yuanwei Investment Company with her husband. Qi is thought to own, directly or through her daughter and husband, company shares and real estate valued in the hundreds of millions of United States dollars.

Qi has bought shares in various companies, including the Wanda Commerce Real Estate Company, which she purchased with Deng Jiagui for US$28.6 million in 2009. Qi and her husband transferred the shares in 2013, supposedly to an employee, so that the couple could avoid claims of conflict of interest.

== Property ==
In 2020, the New York Times released a report which mentioned Qi Qiaoqiao and her daughter, Zhang Yannan. Qi Qiaoqiao was shown to have bought property in Hong Kong as early as 1991, with a 2012 Bloomberg report stating that the property was bought for HK $3 million at the Pacific Palisades complex in Braemar Hill. It was also mentioned that Qi would sometimes use the alias Chai Lin-hing for ownership of companies and property.

In 2005, her daughter, Zhang Yannan was transferred a property from her parents, a unit at Regent on the Park in Mid-Levels. Zhang Yannan was also shown to own a villa at Repulse Bay Garden on Belleview Drive in Repulse Bay, bought in 2009 for US $19.3 million. Along with that property, the New York Times found that Zhang Yannan owns at least 5 other properties in Hong Kong, with Bloomberg specifying that 4 of the units are at the Convention Plaza Apartments in Wan Chai.
