= Heroes of Sui and Tang Dynasties (2014 TV series) =

Chinese television series

- Genre: Historical
- Based on: Rulian Jushi Shuotang
- Written by: Zhao Ruiyong
- Directed by: Wang Xiangwei
- Starring: Dicky Cheung; Liu Xiaoqing; Zheng Guolin; Huang Haibing; Ray Zhang; Li Choi Wah; Yoki Sun; Ye Zuxin
- Opening theme: Dicky Cheung - Real Heroes
- Ending theme: Dicky Cheung - Love Dearly
- Country of origin: China
- Original language: Mandarin
- No. of episodes: 130

Production
- Production location: Hengdian World Studios
- Production companies: Zhejiang Great Wall Entertainment Co., Ltd

Original release
- Network: Hunan Television
- Release: January 28 – April 19, 2014

Heroes of Sui and Tang Dynasties
- Traditional Chinese: 隋唐英雄
- Simplified Chinese: 隋唐英雄
Transcriptions
Standard Mandarin
- Hanyu Pinyin: Suí Táng Yīngxióng

Heroes of Sui and Tang Dynasties 3 & 4 is a 2014 Chinese historical television series and sequel to Heroes of Sui and Tang Dynasties 1 & 2, adapted from Rulian Jushi's (Chinese: 如莲居士) classical novel Shuotang (Chinese: 《说唐》). The series directed by Wang Xiangwei, and starring Dicky Cheung, Liu Xiaoqing, Zheng Guolin, Huang Haibing, Ray Zhang, Li Choi Wah, Yoki Sun, and Ye Zuxin. It was first aired on Hunan Television in China in 2014.

== Plot ==
During the early years of the Tang dynasty, Li Shimin and his general Xue Rengui were captured by Su Baotong. Xue Rengui was also killed by Su Baotong's poison. Xue Rengui's son, Xue Dingshan learned about his father's death and swore revenge. With the help of Cheng Yaojin, Luo Tong, and other generals, Xue Dingshan successfully saves Li Shimin and pursues Fan Lihua. Meanwhile, Li Shimin pursues the unique Ouyang Feiyan.

== Cast ==
- Dicky Cheung as Cheng Yaojin/ Cheng Huailiang.
- Liu Xiaoqing as Ouyang Feiyan.
- Zheng Guolin as Emperor Taizong of Tang.
- Ray Zhang as Luo Tong.
- Li Choi Wah as Su Baofeng.
- Huang Haibing as Xue Rengui.
- Ye Zuxin as Xue Ne.
- Yoki Sun as Fan Lihua.
- Edward Zhang as Yang Fan.
- Liu Yanxi as Empress Zhangsun.
- Wang Hao as Li Chengqian.
- June Wu as Li Ke.
- Wang Heyu as Li Tai.
- Lou Yajiang as Fang Yi'ai.
- Zheng Siren as Emperor Gaozong of Tang.
- Chen Liangping as Zhangsun Wuji.
- Kent Tong as King Baokang.
- Yang Hongwu as Qin Shubao.
- Hou Jie as Yuchi Gong.
- Yuan Bingyan as Zhao Furong.
