= Towards the Republic =

2003 Chinese television series

- DVD cover art
- Also known as: For the Sake of the Republic
- 走向共和
- Genre: Historical drama
- Written by: Sheng Heyu; Zhang Jianwei
- Directed by: Zhang Li
- Presented by: Gao Jianmin; Liu Wenwu
- Starring: Wang Bing; Lü Zhong; Sun Chun; Ma Shaohua; Li Guangjie
- Opening theme: "Towards the Republic" (走向共和) by Xu Peidong
- Ending theme: "Youthful Aspirations" (年轻的向往) by Song Zuying
- Composer: Xu Peidong
- Country of origin: China
- Original language: Mandarin
- No. of episodes: 60

Production
- Executive producers: Zhao Huayong; Xie Jianhui
- Producers: Zheng Jiaming; Hu En; Li Jian; Wu Zhaolong
- Production location: China
- Cinematography: Huang Wei; Cui Weidong
- Editor: Liu Miaomiao
- Running time: 45 minutes per episode

Original release
- Network: CCTV

Towards the Republic
- Chinese: 走向共和
Transcriptions
Standard Mandarin
- Hanyu Pinyin: Zǒu Xiàng Gòng Hé

Towards the Republic (走向共和), also known as For the Sake of the Republic, is a Chinese historical drama television series first broadcast on China Central Television (CCTV) in China from April to May 2003. The series is based on historical events in China in the late 19th century and early 20th century which led to the collapse of the Qing dynasty and the establishment of the Republic of China. As the series portrays historical issues which are politically sensitive in present-day China, the series has been subjected to censorship.

== Synopsis ==
The series follows major historical events of the late Qing dynasty and Republican era in the late 19th century and early 20th century in China, including the First Sino-Japanese War (1894–1895), the Hundred Days' Reform (1898), the Boxer Rebellion (1900), and the 1911 Revolution.

The series narrates historical events and portrays the private lives of key political figures such as Li Hongzhang, the Guangxu Emperor, Yuan Shikai and Sun Yat-sen. There are monarchists, reformers and revolutionaries who provide different answers to addressing the deteriorating situation of the Qing dynasty but all these answers point towards a common goal – to restore China as a sovereign, international and independent power.

== Cast ==
- Wang Bing as Li Hongzhang
- Lü Zhong as Empress Dowager Cixi
- Ma Shaohua as Sun Yat-sen
- Sun Chun as Yuan Shikai
- Li Guangjie as Guangxu Emperor
- Xu Min as Prince Qing
- Jiang Nan as Empress Dowager Longyu
- Zheng Tianyong as Prince Gong
- Hao Zi as Zaizhen
- Hao Bojie as Zaize
- Asiru as Consort Zhen
- Ge Zhijun as Ronglu
- Zhang Ju as Weng Tonghe
- Liao Bingyan as Zhang Zhidong
- Jia Yiping as Tieliang
- Wen Haibo as Sheng Xuanhuai
- Liu Weiming as Zhang Jian
- Tian Xiaojie as Gu Hongming
- Han Yingqun as Ma Sanjun
- Su Mao as Deng Shichang
- Li Yonggui as Li Lianying
- Ma Xiaoning as Xiaodezhang
- Zheng Tianyong as Qu Hongji
- Sun Ning as Kang Youwei
- Zhang Han as Liang Qichao
- Li Chuanying as Huang Xing
- Qiao Lisheng as Song Jiaoren
- Zheng Yu as Xu Shichang
- Cai Wei as Li Yuanhong
- Ma Lun as Duan Qirui
- Yang Junyong as Ying Guixin
- Li Yi as Zhao Bingjun
- Yao Gang as Feng Guozhang
- Han Zaifen as Shen Yuying
- Yano Koji as Emperor Meiji
- Hirata Yasuyuki as Itō Hirobumi
- Nakamura Bunpei as Itō Sukeyuki
- Kuwana Waku as Mutsu Munemitsu
- Kamitani as Komura Jutarō
- J. René Godin as Alfred von Waldersee
- Hoshino Akiraka as Saigō Tsugumichi

== Censorship ==
The politically sensitive issues which likely triggered the heavy censorship of the series included issues such as the more sympathetic and complex portrayal of Empress Dowager Cixi, Yuan Shikai and Li Hongzhang, who are usually portrayed in a negative light in official Chinese historiography. Historically accurate but politically inconvenient quotes, such as Sun Yat-sen's speech on inequality and the suppression of democracy, were cut from the series.

The censorship has significantly reduced the length of some episodes. The final episode was cut to nearly half of its original duration of 50 minutes, and the series was reorganised from scripted 60 to aired 59 episodes. The censors also blocked plans for a rerun. The censorship, however, did not prevent the international distribution of the series on VCD and DVD (these versions also suffered less from censorship than the version aired on CCTV).

== Reception ==
The series has been very popular in China. The debate caused by the series, as well as its censorship and issues for discussion, have been compared to a similar event in 1988 involving another documentary television series River Elegy. River Elegy drew criticism for presenting a controversial view on Chinese culture, and is seen as a factor that influenced the 1989 Tiananmen Square protests and massacre. Issues raised in discussions include questions on the extent to which artists are permitted to reinterpret history, and the degree to which certain portrayal of historical figures and events is dictated by politics rather than science. As a consequence of the controversy caused by this series, the Central Propaganda Department of the Chinese Communist Party began an analysis of "the accuracy with which historical figures are represented in television dramas".

== Historical Inaccuracies ==
In Episode 6 of the CCTV version, to expedite the passage of the military budget, Emperor Meiji announced that he would henceforth eat only one meal a day. However, there is no primary Japanese source—such as imperial diaries, court archives, or contemporaneous government budgets—that confirms Emperor Meiji literally skipped meals to fund a ship. Moreover, a Google search reveals that this claim is predominantly found on Chinese websites, with no relevant content appearing in Japanese searches, and the articles date back to after 2003, following the broadcast of Towards the Republic.

In the series, it is depicted that Emperor Meiji issued an edict to allocate all indemnity payments from the Treaty of Shimonoseki to education. In reality, the majority of these funds were primarily utilized for the expansion of Japan's land and naval forces, with only a minuscule portion allocated to education. If all the indemnity had been exclusively used for education, it would have been detrimental to Japan's future national policy of territorial expansion, rendering such a scenario clearly unreasonable and lacking in common sense.

== See also ==
- 1911 (film)
- 1911 Revolution (TV series)
