= Ma Shaohua =

Chinese actor

- 马少骅
- Born: 23 September 1955 (age 70); Guizhou, China
- Education: Shanghai Theatre Academy
- Occupation: Actor
- Years active: 1989–present
- Notable work: Deng Xiaoping at History's Crossroads
- Political party: Communist Party

Chinese name
- Traditional Chinese: 馬少驊
- Simplified Chinese: 马少骅
Transcriptions
Standard Mandarin
- Hanyu Pinyin: Mǎ Shàohuá

Ma Shaohua (born 23 September 1955) is a Chinese actor best known for portraying historical figures such as Sun Yat-sen and Deng Xiaoping in several films and television series. He became widely known to audiences with Towards the Republic, The Emperor in Han Dynasty, The Rise of the Tang Empire, and Deng Xiaoping at History's Crossroads.

== Early life and education ==
Ma was born into a Hui family in Guizhou, on 23 September 1955. After the third grade of primary school, he attended Beijing Opera Class of Guizhou Art School, studying Laosheng. In 1969, he became an actor at the Cultural Work Corps of Guizhou Military District and moved to Guizhou Modern Drama Troupe in 1975. After resuming the college entrance examination, in 1978, he entered Shanghai Theatre Academy, majoring in comedy.

== Acting career ==
Ma made his screen debut with a supporting role as Sun Yat-sen in Li Dazhao (1989). In 1997, Ma made his film debut with a small role in the war film The Ninth Battalion.

In 2000, he portrayed Sun Yat-sen in the biographical television series Civilian President.

Ma starred as Sun Yat-sen, reuniting him with co-star Zhou Li, who played Song Qingling, in the 2001 biographical film Twelve Years of Wind and Rain.

In 2002, he guest-starred on the historical television series Towards the Republic, playing Sun Yat-sen.

Ma took the lead role as Zhang Daqian in the 2003 biographical television series Legend of Dun Huang: Zhang Daqian.

In 2005, he participated in The Emperor in Han Dynasty as Dou Ying, prime minister of the Han Empire.

Ma co-starred with Ma Yue and Jin Shijie in the 2006 historical television series The Rise of the Tang Empire as Zhangsun Wuji, the prime minister of Tang Empire.

In 2009, he appeared in Ning Hao's black comedy film Crazy Racer, playing the coach of Huang Bo's character. For his role in Yimeng, Ma was nominated Outstanding Actor at the 28th Flying Apsaras Awards. That same year, he was nominated for Best Actor at the 25th China TV Golden Eagle Award for his performance in Stranger.

In 2011, he appeared in the propaganda film The Founding of a Party, in which he played Sun Yat-sen.

In 2014, Ma was cast in the war television series All Quiet in Peking.

Ma's performance in Deng Xiaoping at History's Crossroads which garnered him Best Actor Award at the 18th Chunyan Awards, Outstanding Contribution Award at the 21st Shanghai Television Festival, and 13th Sichuan TV Festival nomination for Best Actor in Long TV Series.

In 2017, he was cast in the medical drama Surgeons, opposite Jin Dong, Bai Baihe, and Li Jiahang.

In 2021, he portrayed Cai Yuanpei in the propaganda television series The Awakeing Age and joined the main cast of Our Southwest Associated University as Feng Youlan. He also filmed in the biographical historical drama The Pioneer as Sun Yat-sen.

== Filmography ==
=== Film ===
Year	English title	Chinese title	Role	Notes
1997	The Ninth Battalion	第九营	Zhou Tong	
2001	Twelve Years of Wind and Rain	风雨十二年	Sun Yat-sen	
2006	Being A Son and Comrade	儿子同志	Commander Yang	
2009	Crazy Racer	疯狂的赛车	Ma Danian	
2010	A Season of Good Rain	好雨时节	Ma Hao	
2011	The Founding of a Party	建党伟业	Sun Yat-sen	
2013	One Hundred Yuan	一百元	Zhu Yude	
2015	Gao Derong	独龙之子高德荣	Gao Derong	
2018		匠心	Lu Mingxin	
2021	The Pioneer	革命者	Sun Yat-sen	

=== Television ===
Year	English title	Chinese title	Role	Notes
1989	Li Dazhao	李大钊	Sun Yat-sen	
1996	Hero Without Regrets	英雄无悔	Liu Guitian	
1998	Chief Justice	大法官	Wang Yuhe	
1998	Commercial Flag	商旗	Sheng Xuanhuai	
1999	I'm a Policeman	我是警察	Xiao Wenping	
1999		铁血警魂	Lian Keqin	
2000	Civilian President	平民大总统	Sun Yat-sen	
2003	Towards the Republic	走向共和	Sun Yat-sen	
2003	Legend of Dun Huang: Zhang Daqian	张大千敦煌传奇	Zhang Daqian	
2004	Family Head	当家人	Li Tianming	
2005	Surviving Migrant Workers	生存之民工	Xie Laoda	
2005	Bloody 1941	喋血1941	Japanese military officer	
2005	Legend of Zhengde	正德演义	Tang Rensun	
2005	Happy Face	欢颜	Master Liu	
2005		一针见血	Chen Kaiming	
2005	The Emperor in Han Dynasty	汉武大帝	Dou Ying	
2006		追杀横路靖六	Wen Shanren	
2006	The Rise of the Tang Empire	贞观之治	Zhangsun Wuji	
2007	Undercurrent	暗流		
2008	Legend of the Red Lantern	红灯记	Hatoyama	
2008	Be a Big Shopkeeper	当家大掌柜	Xiao Zifu	
2008	Secret Train	秘密列车	Zhou Mingtian	
2008	Bloody Persistence	浴血坚持	Chen Yi	
2009	What a Big Tree	好大一棵树	Deng Pingshou	
2009	Stranger	外乡人	Xie Changfa	
2009	Guanzhong Gunshots	关中枪声	Liang Shoudao	
2009	Yimeng	沂蒙	Li Zhonghou	
2011	Holy Gate	圣天门口	Xue Da's father	
2011	1911 Revolution	辛亥革命	Sun Yat-sen	
2012		生死依托	Zhang Gui	
2013	A Devil Don't Leave	一个鬼子都不留	Li Zhankui	
2013	National Defense Student	国防生	Zhao Zhikai	
2014	All Quiet in Peking	北平无战事	Lin Dawei	
2014	My Son	我的儿子是奇葩	Chun Sanfu	
2014	Hometown	原乡	Du Shouzheng	
2014	Deng Xiaoping at History's Crossroads	历史转折中的邓小平	Deng Xiaoping	
2015	Feng Zicai	冯子材	Feng Zicai	
2016		搭错车	Tong Lin	
2017	Surgeons	外科风云	Fu Bowen	
2018		黄土高天	Zhang Tianshun	
2019	In Law We Believe	因法之名	Chen Qian	
2021	The Awakeing Age	觉醒年代	Cai Yuanpei	
2021	Our Southwest Associated University	我们的西南联大	Feng Youlan	
2021	Faith Makes Great	理想照耀中国	Wu Dengyun	
2021	The Glory and the Dream	光荣与梦想	Sun Yat-sen	
2021	The Sword and the Brocade	锦心似玉	Marquis of Jingyuan	
2021		中流击水	Sun Yat-sen	
2021		国家情怀		
TBA	Ding Baozhen	民为天之丁宝桢	Ding Baozhen	

== Awards and nominations ==
Year	Nominated work	Award	Category	Result	Notes
2010	Stranger	25th China TV Golden Eagle Award	Best Actor	Nominated	
2011	Yimeng	28th Flying Apsaras Awards	Outstanding Actor	Nominated	
2013	Xinhai Revolution	29th Flying Apsaras Awards	Outstanding Actor	Nominated	
2015	Deng Xiaoping at History's Crossroads	13th Sichuan TV Festival	Best Actor in Long TV Series	Nominated	
2015	Deng Xiaoping at History's Crossroads	18th Chunyan Awards	Best Actor	Won	
2015	Deng Xiaoping at History's Crossroads	21st Shanghai Television Festival	Outstanding Contribution Award	Won	
2021	The Awakeing Age	27th Shanghai Television Festival	Best Supporting Actor	Nominated	
2022	The Awakeing Age	31st China TV Golden Eagle Award	Best Supporting Actor	Won	
