= The Affaire in the Swing Age =

- DVD cover art
- Also known as: The Dynasty; Love Against Kingship
- 江山风雨情
- Genre: Historical drama
- Screenplay by: Zhu Sujin
- Directed by: Chen Jialin; He Xianda
- Presented by: Li Kangsheng; Luo Shan; Yang Buting
- Starring: Wang Gang; Tang Guoqiang; Chen Daoming; Li Qiang; Zhang Lanlan; Ding Haifeng; Liu Wei; Chen Baoguo
- Opening theme: "Dream of Peace" (平安梦) by Han Lei
- Ending theme: "The Bian River Flows" (汴水流) by Han Lei and Liu Jin
- Country of origin: China
- Original language: Mandarin
- No. of episodes: 45

Production
- Executive producer: Jiang Xiaoqun
- Producers: Han Sanping; Zhu Cheng
- Production location: China
- Cinematography: Su Li
- Running time: ≈45 minutes per episode

Original release
- Network: CCTV
- Release: June 30, 2005

The Affaire in the Swing Age (江山风雨情), also known as The Dynasty or Love Against Kingship, is a 2003 Chinese television series based on the historical novel Jiangshan Fengyu Qing by Zhu Sujin, who was also the screenwriter for the series. The series depicts the events of the transition from the Ming dynasty to the Qing dynasty, focusing on the lives of historical figures such as Li Zicheng, Wu Sangui, Chen Yuanyuan, the Chongzhen Emperor, and Huangtaiji.

== Synopsis ==
In 1627, the Chongzhen Emperor becomes the ruler of the Ming Empire with the support of the eunuch Wang Cheng'en. The hardworking Chongzhen Emperor strives to save the declining empire from collapse, seeking to restore it to its former glory. However, it seems impossible for him to achieve his goals because the Ming government has been plagued by corruption long before his time, and the people have also started a rebellion under the leadership of Li Zicheng. On the northern frontier, Huangtaiji, the ambitious ruler of the Manchu-led Later Jin, is actively preparing for an invasion of the Ming Empire.

Yuan Chonghuan and Hong Chengchou are capable generals appointed by the Chongzhen Emperor to counter the Manchu invaders, but they meet different fates. The emperor executes Yuan Chonghuan after believing false accusations that Yuan is plotting against him. Hong Chengchou surrenders to the Manchus after his defeat at the Battle of Songjin, and joins them in attacking Ming forces.

In 1644, Li Zicheng's rebels capture the Ming capital, Beijing. The Chongzhen Emperor commits suicide by hanging himself on a tree. Shortly after, the Ming general Wu Sangui defects to the Manchus after learning that the rebels have seized his beloved concubine, Chen Yuanyuan. Wu Sangui opens Shanhai Pass, allowing the Manchus to enter and overrun the rest of the Ming Empire.

== Cast ==
- Wang Gang as Wang Cheng'en
- Ding Haifeng as Wu Sangui
- Liu Wei as Li Zicheng
- Zhang Lanlan as Chen Yuanyuan
- Tang Guoqiang as Huangtaiji
- Chen Daoming as the Tianqi Emperor
- Chen Baoguo as Zhu Changying
- Bao Guo'an as Hong Chengchou
- Li Qiang as the Chongzhen Emperor
- Li Jianqun as Empress Zhou
- Xi Xue as Princess Le'an
- Wang Huichun as Fan Renkuan
- Zhou Jie as Hou Chaozong
- Yan Kun as the Shunzhi Emperor
- Deng Chao as the Kangxi Emperor
- Xu Min as the Longwu Emperor
- Li Ding as Wei Zhongxian
- He Xianda as Zheng Chenggong
- Niu Li as Consort Zhuang
- Wei Deshan as Jirgalang
- Li Zhi as Dorgon
- Wang Minghu as Hooge
- Zhang Xiaozhong as Yuan Chonghuan
- Liu Jun as Huang Yu
- Ma Jie as Lu Si
- Zhang Qiuge as Liu Zongmin
- Liu Yubin as Zhou Yanru
- Wang Jinghua as the Tianqi Emperor's concubine
- Zeng Jing as Eunuch Liu
- Liu Peiqing as Gao Yingxiang

== Production ==
The Affaire in the Swing Age is one of the earlier large-scale historical dramas set in the Ming dynasty to be produced in mainland China, following the success of Qing dynasty dramas such as Yongzheng Dynasty (1999) and Kangxi Dynasty (2001). Generally, it is considered historically accurate despite taking some liberties with historical figures and events. The sets, costumes and designs were rather elaborate for an early 2000s production. The series has significantly influenced later Ming dynasty dramas such as Ming Dynasty in 1566 (2007) and Ming Dynasty (2019).

== Music ==
- "Dream of Peace" (平安梦) by Han Lei, the opening theme song
- "The Bian River Flows" (汴水流) by Han Lei and Liu Jin, the closing theme song
- "Red Lips, Woman's Love" (点绛唇·闺情) by Liu Jin
- "Jade Cloud Sky" (碧云天) by Liu Jin
