= 1911 Revolution (TV series) =

2011 Chinese television series

- Promotional poster
- Also known as: Xinhai Revolution
- 辛亥革命
- Genre: Historical drama
- Written by: Wang Chaozhu
- Directed by: Tang Guoqiang; Li Wei; Zhang Chunlin
- Creative director: Sun Jiming
- Presented by: Wan Ke
- Starring: Ma Shaohua; Zhang Qiuge; Yao Jude; Ma Xiaowei
- Ending theme: "Tides of the World" (世界潮流) by Liao Changyong
- Composer: Su Cong
- Country of origin: China
- Original language: Mandarin
- No. of episodes: 41

Production
- Executive producers: Huang Jincheng; Tang Haibo; Yang Junyi; Wang Lan
- Producers: Cheng Qisheng; Ni Zuming; Sun Jie; Zheng Qiao; Jiang Shiming; Zhang Xiuying
- Production location: Tianjin
- Cinematography: Sun Zhiping; Ji Wei
- Editor: Zhang Ji
- Running time: 45 minutes per episode
- Production companies: Tianjin Television; Propaganda Department of the Tianjin Municipal Committee of the Chinese Communist Party

Original release
- Network: CCTV-1
- Release: 27 September 2011

1911 Revolution (辛亥革命) is a Chinese historical drama television series based on the events of the 1911 Revolution, which brought an end to centuries of imperial rule in China. Specially produced to mark the 100th anniversary of the 1911 Revolution, it was first broadcast in China on CCTV-1 during prime time on 27 September 2011.

== Synopsis ==
The series follows the major events that happened throughout the life of Sun Yat-sen, the founder of the Republic of China. It includes, among other events, the formation of the Tongmenghui, the Wuchang Uprising, the fall of the Qing dynasty, the establishment of the Republic of China, Yuan Shikai's rise and fall from power, and the National Protection War.

== Cast ==
- Ma Shaohua as Sun Yat-sen
- Yao Jude as Huang Xing
- Zhang Qiuge as Yuan Shikai
- Wen Qing as Soong Ching-ling
- Zhang Beishi as Song Jiaoren
- Brenda Wang as Chen Cuifen
- Stephanie Siao as Qiu Jin
- Bo Cen as Hu Hanmin
- Guan Danli as Lu Muzhen
- Yu Rongguang as Cai E
- Yu Xiaohui as Ni Guizhen
- Liu Boying as Song Jiashu
- Liu Yue as Li Zhongshi
- Nige Mutu as Xu Shichang
- Di Wanchen as Li Yuanhong
- Shi Liang as Zhang Zhenwu
- Ma Guangze as Wang Jingwei
- Ma Heyao as Chen Bijun
- Luo Yinan as Fang Junying
- Wang Nan as Cai Yuanpei
- Gao Yu as Liao Zhongkai
- Wang Yadi as Chen Qimei
- Zhang Ruihan as Zhang Ji
- Yang Junyong as Yuan Keding
- Ji Shuai as Ma Xiang
- Bai Yao as Yin Weijun
- Wang Zhuoya as Yin Ruizhi
- Yang Fan as Sun Wu
- Sun Leiyan as Ju Zheng
- Wan Yifu as Yuan Kewen
- Ma Xiaowei as Zhang Taiyan
- Zhang Shihui as Tan Renfeng
- Lu Lin as Zhu Zhixin
- Zhao Kai as Liu Kuiyi
- Li Xiaofeng as Chen Tianhua
- Lin Yijie as Yu Peilun
- Fan Yulin as Xu Xilin
- Hao Xiaodong as Su Manzhu
- Li Weiwei as Soong Ai-ling
- Yu Qian as Wu Zhaolin
- Guo Wenxue as Xiong Xiling
- Wang Zhe as Feng Guozhang
- Wang Wei as Duan Qirui
- Wang Kaiyang as Lu Xun
- Ye Jin as Hu Daonan
- Zhao Lixin as Yang Du
- Li Hongwei as Zhao Bingjun
- Zhang Su as Liu Shipei
- Lu Hao as Huang Kan
- Zhang Bo as Tang Shouqian
- Sun Ge as Xiaofengxian
- He Hongshan as Yuan Shikai's sixth wife
- Zheng Tianyong as Yikuang
- Chen Zhou as Ni Sichong
- Wang Maolei as Zaifeng
- Zhou Qing as Empress Dowager Longyu
- Fan Xiaoyang as Liang Qichao
- Dong Zhao as Zhang Zhidong
- Zhang Chunlin as Tie Liang
- Ma Wenbo as Tie Zhong
- Wang Guojing as En Ming
- Yoneoka as Tōten Miyazaki

== Production ==
The Central Propaganda Department of the Chinese Communist Party (CCP) marketed 1911 Revolution as an important tribute to celebrate the 100th anniversary of the 1911 Revolution. Produced by Tianjin Television and the Propaganda Department of the Tianjin Municipal Committee of the CCP, the series started its planning work in 2008 and completed its preparations by the second half of 2009. A press conference was held on 24 October 2010, at the Great Hall of the People in Beijing to announce the series. Shooting began on the following day in Tianjin and wrapped up on 15 March 2011. Li Wei, the director for the series, mentioned that the plot would be as historically accurate as possible, and that there is historical evidence to support how the historical figures (over 200 of them) in the series are portrayed.

== See also ==
- 1911 (film)
- Towards the Republic
