= Han Zaifen =

Chinese performer of Huangmei opera (born 1968)

Han Zaifen (Chinese: 韩再芬; born 20 March 1968) is a Chinese performer of Huangmei opera who is widely regarded as a Huangmei opera superstar. She is the only Huangmei opera artist to have won the prestigious Plum Blossom Award twice. She performed on CCTV Spring Festival Gala a total of seven times. She also starred in some non-musical TV series.

== Biography ==
Han was born in Qianshan, Anqing, Anhui province in 1968.

== Filmography ==
Year	English title	Original title	Role	Notes
1986	The Romance of an Anhui Merchant	徽商情緣	Chen Wenyan	Huangmei opera film
1987	The Emperor's Female Son-in-Law	女駙馬	Feng Suzhen	Huangmei opera film
1991	Peach Blossom Fan	桃花扇	Li Xiangjun	Huangmei opera series
1995	Meng Lijun	孟麗君	Meng Lijun	Huangmei opera series
1995	Family, Spring, Autumn	家春秋		Huangmei opera series
1995	Li Shishi and Emperor Huizong of Song	李師師與宋徽宗	Li Shishi	Huangmei opera series
1998	Love of the Dragon and Phoenix	龍鳳奇緣		Huangmei opera film
1998	Along the River During the Qingming Festival	清明上河圖	Xiao Lan	
2000	Wenzhou Women	温州女人		Huangmei opera series
2001	Rouge and Mustache	紅粉鬚眉	Aunt Qin	
2001	The Great Dragon Postage Stamp	大龍郵票	Empress Dowager Cixi	
2001	The Life-and-Death Duel	生死擂	Su Yueying	Huangmei opera film
2002	Red Poppies	塵埃落定	Ronggong	
2002	Pan Zhang Yuliang	潘張玉良	Pan Zhang Yuliang	Huangmei opera series
2003	Towards the Republic	走向共和	Shen Yuying	
2004	Blood Is Thicker Than Water	血浓于水	Chen Aihua	
2007	The Naval Story	船政風雲	Empress Dowager Cixi	
2007	Fairy Couple	天仙配	Queen Mother of the West	
2007	Carol of Zhenguan	貞觀長歌	Empress Zhangsun	
2010	The Six-Foot Alley	六尺巷	Yao Xianglan	Huangmei opera film
