= Miao Pu =

Chinese actress (born 1977)

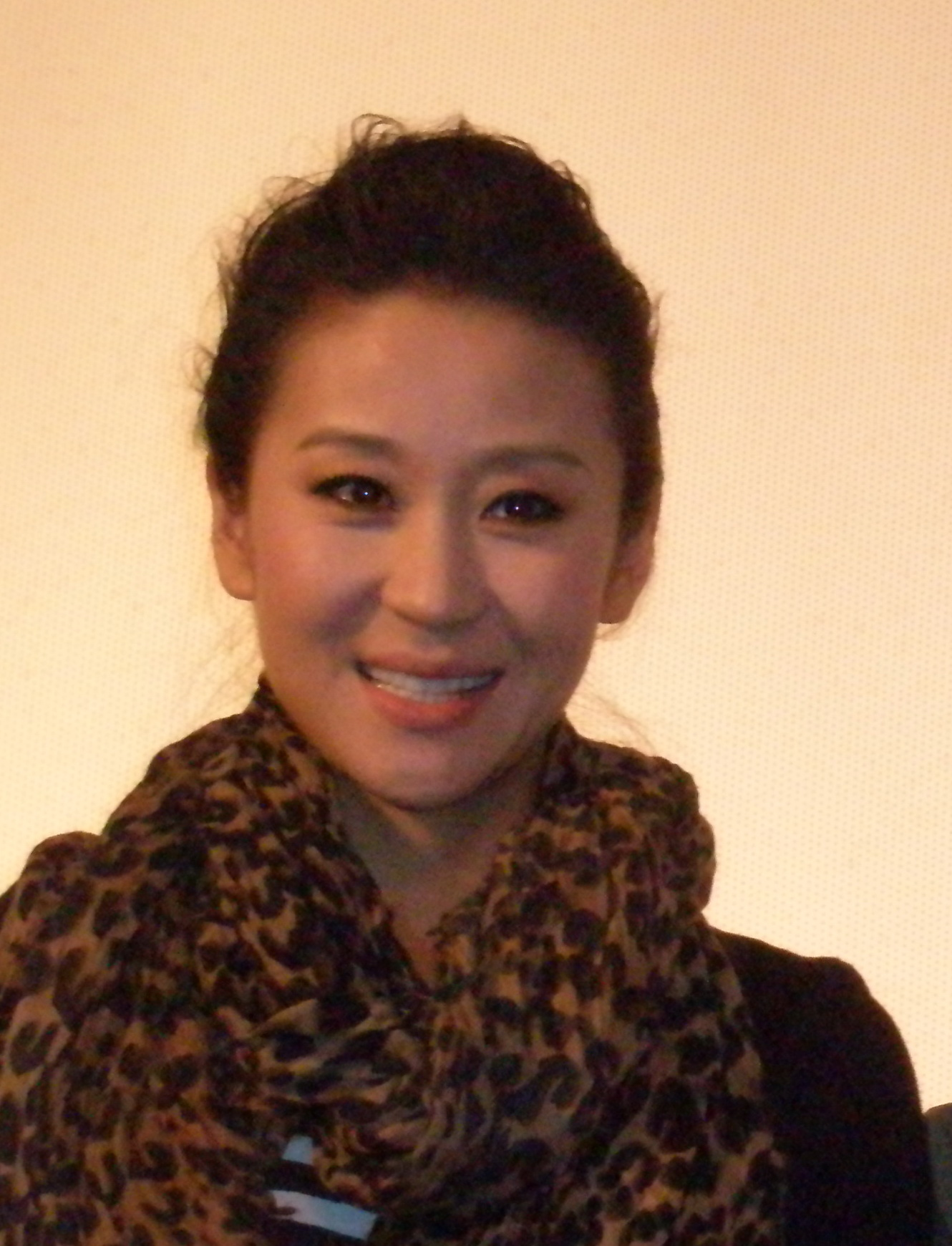
- Born: February 22, 1977 (age 49); Xi'an, Shanxi, China
- Education: Beijing Film Academy
- Occupation: Actress
- Years active: 1995 - present
- Musical career
- Label: Variety Queen

Miao Pu (born 22 February 1977) is a Chinese actress.

== Biography ==
Miao was born in a family of actors in Xi'an. Her parents are both Qinqiang actors. When she was five years old, she firstly performed on the stage with her parents in the play, "The New Year Sacrifice" (祝福). She played the role of Máo, the son of Xianglin Sao. In 1995, she won the first in the second International Visual and Performing Arts Competition. In 1998, she graduated from Beijing Film Academy (BFA). Only one-year graduation from BFA, she had cooperated with several famous directors like Yimou Zhang and Jianxin Huang. She, Li Xiaolu, Tao Hong and Zhu Yuanyuan were together called Four Tsing Yi at that time.

Miao participated in the period drama series "Legacy" which will premiere exclusively on WarnerMedia's regional streaming service HBO Go at an unspecified date later in 2021. "Legacy" is a 1920s-set drama that chronicles the lives of the wealthy Yi family and three sisters who vie to inherit their father's shopping mall business. In a time of upheaval and uncertainty, the three sisters set aside their differences to keep the business afloat and save their family.

== Filmography ==
=== Film ===
Year	Title	Role	Notes
1996	A White Horse Named Feifei 白马飞飞	Miaomiao	
2003	Master 高人	Miaomiao	
2004	Gimme Kudos 求求你表扬我	Miyi	
2005	Snow in the Wind 雪花那个飘	Hu Sao	premiered at the Cannes Film Festival
2005	Clay Fear 陶器形人	Ye Yue	
2007	Phoenix Red 凤凰	Zhou Hong	won Best Actress at the 15th Beijing College Student Film Festival
2008	Ching yan 证人	Yali	guest star
2008	Ying Tao 樱桃	Ying Tao	won Best Actress of the 17th Shanghai Film Critics Award
2009	Gao Xing 高兴	Hu Xing	
2009	The Founding of a Republic 建国大业	A representative	guest star
2009	The Treasure Hunter 刺陵	Shisan Lang	
2009	Principles of the Ox Village 牛村规则	Lizhen	
2009	Unusual Love 惊情	Shuiyun	
2010	The Stool Pigeon 线人	Xue	
2010	A Don't Be Careful 一不留神	Master Fan	
2010	Don Quixote 魔侠传之唐吉可德	Jin Xiangtong	
2010	Let the Bullets Fly 让子弹飞	ex-wife of Lao Tang	guest star
2012	Truth or Dare 真心话大冒险	Tang Fei	
2013	Ox Thief 牛胆神偷		
2017	Six Years, Six Days		

=== Television ===
Year	Title	Role	Notes
1995	Daobei People 道北人	Furong	
1995	Flying Snow 飘雪		
1996	The New Army Camp 新兵营	Wan Yiqing	
1996	Wuthering Heights 呼啸山庄	Li Tianbao	
1997	The City Love King 都市情王		
2000	Care 关怀	Fenghuang	
2001	Blue Competition 蓝色较量	Gu Pan	
2001	DjKori Club Dance Rmx 让爱随风	Luo Xiaoman	
2001	Threat 威胁	Xingfang	
2002	Absolute Control 绝对控制	Chu Xiaoming	
2002	Heart Guess 猜心妙手夺魂剑	Ziyun	
2002	The Marriage Trap 婚姻陷阱	Qin Shilin and Li Yinger	
2002	A Lone Guard 热血忠魂之独行侍卫	Tuer	
2002	May Sophora Flower Perfume 五月槐花香	Mohe	won the nomination of the 25th Flying Apsaras Award
2002	The Juge in Song Dynasty 大宋提刑官	Yuniang	guest star
2004	The Story of Zhuo'er 卓尔的故事	Dingding	alternate title Women on the Edge (作女)
2004	The Eye of the Sky 苍天有眼	Wangyan	
2004	Song Liansheng in Charge 宋莲生坐堂	Hong Sanyan	
2005	The Rise of the Tang Empire 贞观之治	Empress Zhangsun	
2005	Dream to Qing River 梦回清河	Qinglian	
2005	The Juge in Song Dynasty II 大宋提刑官2	Yuniang	guest star
2005	Chinese Peacekeeping Police 中国维和警察	Zhou Jing	
2006	A Woman's Choice 女人的选择	Haixia	
2006	The Courtyard of Fan Family 范府大院	Lingzi	
2006	Hot Sun 烈日炎炎	Qiufang	
2007	Our Marriage 我们俩的婚姻	Xia Xiaoning	
2007	I'm a Soldier 我是一个兵	Huani	
2007	The Wolf 雪狼	Nala	
2007	Outside and Inside the Marriage 婚内外	Cheng Xueyi	played two roles
2008	Perfect Ending 完美结局	Chen Wenxia	
2008	A Drop in the Bucket 沧海一粟	Xia Yiqiao	
2008	Root in the Plains 根在中原	Hualian	
2008	Migrate through Xikou 走西口	Douhua	
2008	Brave Journey to Northeast China II 闯关东2	Song Tianxing	
2009	Lei Feng 雷锋	Fangjian	
2009	Past Events of Republic of China Age 民国往事	Mei Shaozhu	
2010	Executive Chef 大厨	Liang Ladi	
2010	Mu Guiying Takes Command 穆桂英挂帅	Mu Guiying	
2011	I'm Crazy about Marriage 我为出嫁狂	Xian Tian	
2011	Earth Fire 地火	Xu Huishan	
2019	Royal Nirvana 鹤唳华亭	Empress Zhao	
2020	Ode to Daughter of Great Tang 大唐女儿行	Empress Zhangsun	
2020	The Heritage 传家		

== Awards ==
- 2005 the nomination of the 25th Flying Apsaras Award
- 2006 the nomination of Golden Eagle Award
- 2007/10/20 the nomination of best actress in Tokyo International Film Festival
- 2007 Forbes the Most Potential Figure Award
- 2008 the best actress in the 15th Beijing College Student Film Festival
- 2008 the best actress of the 17th Shanghai Film Critics Awards
- 2009/8/5 China Film Society of Performing Art Award
