= Deng Xiaoping at History's Crossroads =

- Starring: Ma Shaohua
- Country of origin: China
- Original language: Chinese

Production
- Running time: 48 hours

Original release
- Release: 2014

Deng Xiaoping at History's Crossroads (Chinese: 《历史转折中的邓小平》; pinyin: Lìshǐ zhuǎnzhé zhōng de Dèng Xiǎopíng) is a 2014 TV biopic series based on the life of Deng Xiaoping. It was produced by CCTV.

== Awards and nominations ==
Year	Award	Category	Nominated work	Result	Ref.
2014	6th China TV Drama Awards	Best Television Series		Won	
2014	6th China TV Drama Awards	Best Character	Ma Shaohua	Won	
2016	28th China TV Golden Eagle Award	Outstanding Television Series		Won	
