= Storybook Weaver =

1990 video game

- Developer: MECC
- Publisher: MECC
- Platforms: Windows, Macintosh
- Release: 1990 (original version); 1994 (Deluxe version)
- Genre: Educational
- Mode: Single-player

Storybook Weaver is a 1990 educational game originally released on floppy disk for the Apple IIGS, aimed at children aged 6–12. An updated version, Storybook Weaver Deluxe, was released for Windows and Mac computers and featured much more content than the original. Both versions were released by MECC. The Deluxe version was made available for both home and school environments. A Teacher Resource CD for the software included lesson plans and user guides.

== Gameplay ==
=== Storybook Weaver ===
Storybook Weaver is a program that is intended to enable and motivate children to easily create their own stories on a computer. The most noticeable feature of the game is the sizable space allowed for illustrations on each page of a story. The game offered hundreds of backgrounds, objects and characters that could be selected from easy-to-use categories and placed anywhere on the page through a simple click-and-drag process. Backgrounds in the original featured mostly natural, outdoor locations, with which players could switch between day, night, dawn and dusk effects on the landscape. Users could piece together items such as walls and floors to create indoor settings for stories.

The graphical objects offered in the software included food, furniture, vehicles, vegetation, housing, floors, doors, walls, weather effects, natural landscape features and so on. The characters which could be placed in a story included humans, animals and make-believe people from fairytales and classic mythology. There were many human characters of various nationalities, most of which had several positions to choose from, including standing, running, sitting and sleeping. Fantasy characters included fearsome dragons, hobbits, fairies, giants, ghosts, Greek mythological creatures, and magical beings such as sorcerers and witches such as Baba Yaga. Any object could be creatively manipulated to produce various effects, through flipping objects through various angles or modifying colour, size and shape in a paintshop-type program. For example, a puddle of water could be turned red to represent a pool of blood.

=== Storybook Weaver Deluxe ===
The Deluxe version incorporated a combination of material and functionality from the Storybook Weaver and the My Own Stories software titles and greatly expanded on the features of the original Storybook Weaver with a completely updated user interface.

A screenshot of MECC's Storybook Weaver Deluxe over a Citrix ICA session displaying the interface and tools used to create a story.

This version largely kept the original backgrounds, items and characters from the original game and added a large number of new objects and categories, such as a world landmark category, including the Statue of Liberty and the White House. The objects from the original version were updated in higher textures to match the quality of the new objects. The game offered a lot more features in the real and modern indoor and outdoor world, including streets, cities, a bedroom, a classroom, a shopping mall and much more. The game didn't skimp, however, on aspects of the ancient or fantasy worlds.

A noticeable feature of the Deluxe version was its bilingual capacity. Users could now write stories in English or Spanish, accompanied with a bilingual text-to-speech feature, an English/Spanish spell checker and a thesaurus. Deluxe also included "story-starters" for children who found it more difficult to get into the creative mindset, a voice recording feature, spoken tutorials and a library of object sounds and music. The Deluxe version of the program was re-released in a 2004 edition.

== Critical reception ==
Patrick Honan of Computer Shopper liked that the game transformed stories into multimedia experiences, and appreciated how the game was simple enough to use while difficult enough to master. Meanwhile, Lesley Alderman of The Buffalo News listed the title in an article called "10 TOP-RATED SOFTWARE SELECTIONS FOR YOUR CHILDREN". THE Journal appreciated the game's goal to inspire and motivate kids, and liked that it offered an "easy-to-use" word processor. Knight Ridder described the program as "effortless".
