= Zhang Lanlan =

Chinese singer, actress and TV host (born 1980)

- Born: 23 September 1980 (age 45); Chongqing, China
- Occupations: Actress, singer, host
- Spouse: Xi Yuanping

Chinese name
- Traditional Chinese: 張瀾瀾
- Simplified Chinese: 张澜澜
Transcriptions
Standard Mandarin
- Hanyu Pinyin: Zhāng Lánlán

Zhang Lanlan (Chinese: 张澜澜, born 23 September 1980) is a Chinese singer, actress and TV host who has appeared in numerous Chinese television shows. Originally an entertainer for the military, she was once dubbed the military's first beauty and the Chinese Marilyn Monroe. In 2008, she disappeared from public life only to reappear six years later married to Xi Yuanping, the younger brother of Xi Jinping, General Secretary of the Chinese Communist Party.

== Biography ==
Zhang was born into a working-class family in Chongqing, China and joined a People's Liberation Army choir when she was 15. After the death of her father a year later she joined the Central Military Commission Political Work Department Song and Dance Troupe, a section of the military designed to entertain troops. By 2000 she regularly served as hostess for parties involving the People's Liberation Army and the Chinese Communist Party.

She performed at the 2008 CCTV New Year's Gala, which was her last performance before disappearing from public life. Rumors of her disappearance circulated among the media who speculated that she had an affair with high ranking General Xu Caihou. The State Administration of Press, Publication, Radio, Film and Television issued an order barring media outlets from talking or publishing photos of her.

In 2014, a letter was published in the Shenzhen Daily written by Xi Yuanping, the brother of Paramount leader Xi Jinping, announcing they were married with children. In the letter Xi said "Lanlan is a simple and sincere woman. She not only had a successful career, but is also a competent daughter-in-law, good wife and loving mother." The couple are said to have met in 2005 and that she fell out of public view after the birth of their first child.

== Filmography ==
=== Television series ===
Year	Title	Role	Ref.
2007	Carol of Zhenguan	Princess of Ankang	
2005	The Affaire in the Swing Age	Chen Yuanyuan	
2004	春花秋月	Huo Yuhan	
