= Xi Mingze =

Daughter of Xi Jinping (born 1992)

- 习明泽
- Born: 25 June 1992 (age 34); Fuzhou, Fujian, China
- Education: Zhejiang University; Harvard University (BA)
- Parent(s): Xi Jinping (father); Peng Liyuan (mother)
- Relatives: Xi family

Xi Mingze (Chinese: 习明泽; pinyin: Xí Míngzé; [ɕǐ mǐŋ.tsɤ̌]; born 25 June 1992), nicknamed Xiao Muzi (Chinese: 小木子), is the daughter of Xi Jinping, General Secretary of the Chinese Communist Party, and singer Peng Liyuan.

== Early life and education ==
Xi Mingze was born on 25 June 1992 at Fuzhou Maternal and Child Health Care Hospital in Fuzhou. She is the daughter of Xi Jinping and his wife Peng Liyuan. Xi Mingze keeps a low profile, and not much of her personal information has been revealed to the public. She studied French at her high school, Hangzhou Foreign Language School, from 2006 to 2008.

Xi Mingze enrolled in Harvard University in the United States in 2010, after a year of undergraduate study at Zhejiang University. She enrolled under a pseudonym and maintained a low profile. In 2014, she graduated from Harvard University with a Bachelor of Arts degree in psychology and returned to Beijing.

== Public life ==
Following the 2008 Sichuan earthquake, Xi Mingze volunteered as a disaster relief worker for one week in Hanwang, Mianzhu. In 2013, she made her first public appearance with her parents at the Liangjiahe village in Yan'an, Shaanxi, where they offered Chinese New Year greetings to the locals. She has been described as interested in reading and fashion. In June 2025, in what was considered a rare public appearance, Xi Mingze attended a family dinner for visiting Belarusian President Alexander Lukashenko hosted by Xi Jinping in the Chunyi Garden within Zhongnanhai.

== Information leak ==
In 2019 a man called Niu Tengyu (牛腾宇) was arrested for allegedly leaking pictures of Xi Mingze's ID card on a website called esu.wiki. Radio Free Asia reported that on 30 December 2020, the Maonan District People's Court sentenced Niu to 14 years in prison and a 130,000 RMB fine for "picking quarrels and provoking trouble", "infringing on citizens' personal information", and "incitement of subversion of state power", while the 23 others were given lesser sentences. The case attracted the attention of the United States Congressional-Executive Commission on China, which said in 2022 it would investigate allegations of torture of those detained.

== See also ==
- Xi family
