= Hangzhou Foreign Languages School =

Public secondary school in Hangzhou, Zhejiang, China

- 杭州外国语学校

Location
- 309 Liuhe Road; Hangzhou, Zhejiang, China
- Coordinates: 30°13′20″N 120°01′46″E

Information
- Type: Public secondary school
- Motto: Study for the motherland and get prepared for the future
- Established: 1964
- Principal: Fang Jianwen
- Faculty: 330
- Grades: 7-12
- Enrollment: Circa 2,000
- Website: www.chinahw.net

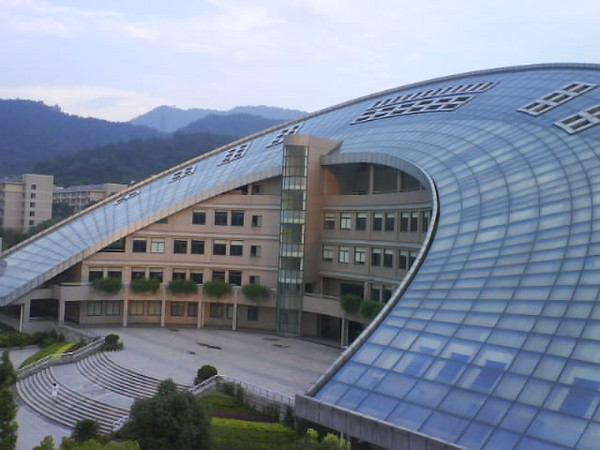
The former Hangzhou Foreign Language School Library

Hangzhou Foreign Languages School (HFLS; 杭州外国语学校) is a public secondary school in Hangzhou, Zhejiang, China. It is managed by the Zhejiang Provincial Education Department.

Hangzhou Foreign Languages School was established in 1964. In 1982, the school introduced a foreign language vocational training class for on-the-job middle school teachers in English. In 2013, Hangzhou Foreign Languages School transitioned from a public-owned, private-run model to a fully public-run model.

== Notable alumni ==
- Xi Mingze, daughter of General Secretary of the Chinese Communist Party Xi Jinping, granddaughter of Eight Elders member Xi Zhongxun
- Colin Huang, Founder and former CEO of Pinduoduo (Temu)
- Frank Wang, Founder and CEO of DJI
- Yichen Shen, Founder and CEO of Lightelligence
