= Yuan Ping (physicist) =

Chinese-American physicist

Yuan Ping is a Chinese and American physicist at the Lawrence Livermore National Laboratory. Her research interests include energy transport in the extreme conditions of inertial confinement fusion, the interaction of ultrashort high-energy laser pulses with solid matter, and the use of Raman amplification in plasma to amplify lasers.

== Education and career ==
Ping was a student at the University of Science and Technology of China, where she received her bachelor's and master's degrees. She completed her Ph.D. at Princeton University, with the 2002 dissertation Soft x-ray lasers and Raman amplification in plasmas supervised by Szymon Suckewer.

She came to the Lawrence Livermore National Laboratory as an E. O. Lawrence distinguished postdoctoral fellow in 2003, and continued as a permanent staff researcher in 2006.

== Recognition ==
Ping was the 2011 recipient of the Katherine Weimer Award for Women in Plasma Science of the American Physical Society (APS), given to her "for pioneering experiments to explore the interaction of high-intensity laser light with matter, including the demonstration of amplification of ultrashort laser pulses by the resonant Raman scheme". In 2013 she received the US Department of Energy Early Career Award.

She was named as a Fellow of the American Physical Society in 2015, after a nomination from the APS Division of Plasma Physics, "for pioneering experiments exploring the nature, equilibration, and use of nonequilibrium plasmas strongly driven by coherent and incoherent sources".
