= Xi Yuanping =

Son of Xi Zhongxun, brother of Xi Jinping

Personal details
- Born: November 1956 (age 69) Beijing, China
- Party: Chinese Communist Party
- Spouse: Zhang Lanlan
- Parent(s): Xi Zhongxun; Qi Xin
- Relatives: Xi family
- Education: PLA Information Engineering University

Xi Yuanping (simplified Chinese: 习远平; traditional Chinese: 習遠平; pinyin: Xí Yuǎnpíng, born November 1956) is the younger brother of the current Chinese Communist Party General Secretary, Xi Jinping. He is currently the president of the International Energy Conservation and Environmental Protection Association.
