= Deng Jiagui =

Chinese businessman

- 邓家贵
- Born: 1951 (age 74–75); China
- Occupation: Businessman
- Political party: Chinese Communist Party
- Spouse: Qi Qiaoqiao
- Children: 1
- Relatives: Xi Jinping (brother-in-law)

Deng Jiagui (born 1951;Chinese: 邓家贵; pinyin: Dèng Jiāguì) is a Chinese businessman, and brother-in-law of Xi Jinping, who is current General Secretary of the Chinese Communist Party and paramount leader of China since 2012.

Deng Jiagui is a Canadian citizen and resident of the Hong Kong SAR. He has "made a fortune in real estate development" and was mentioned in the Panama Papers.

In 2012, Bloomberg reported that Deng Jiagui and his wife Qi Qiaoqiao had holdings in Shenzhen Yuanwei Investment Co worth $288 million, and wholly owned other companies in the Yuanwei group worth $84.8 million - a total of $372.8 million.

Deng, Qi, and their daughter, Zhang Yannan "own millions of dollars in luxury properties in Hong Kong, Shenzhen and Beijing".
