= Princess Gaoyang =

Tang dynasty princess (627–653)

Princess Gaoyang 高阳公主
- Born: 627
- Died: 653 (aged 25–26)
- Spouse: Fang Yi'ai
- House: House of Li
- Father: Emperor Taizong of Tang

Princess Gaoyang
- Traditional Chinese: 高陽公主
- Simplified Chinese: 高阳公主
Transcriptions
Standard Mandarin
- Hanyu Pinyin: Gāoyáng gōngzhǔ
- Wade–Giles: Kao-yang kung-chu

Princess Gaoyang (Chinese: 高陽公主; 627 – 6 March 653) was the seventeenth daughter of Emperor Taizong of the Tang dynasty.

== Early life ==
Princess Gaoyang was born into the Tang imperial family around 627. Her birth mother is unrecorded. Her parents spoiled her and made sure she was well cared for; she had large rooms in the palace and many servants and attendants. (Note: Volume 24 of The Complete Collection of Tang Dynasty Literature (Quan Tang Wen) records a decree granting the title of Princess Gaoyang to the 20th daughter of Emperor Xuanzong and awarding her a fief of 1,000 households.)

== Alleged affair with Bianji ==
According to the New Book of Tang, in her late teens, Gaoyang had an affair with a monk named Bianji. They kept it well hidden for many years, as monks were not supposed to have intimate relationships, and Gaoyang herself was already betrothed to a rich noble named Fang Yi'ai, son of her father's chancellor Fang Xuanling. When their relationship was discovered, Bianji was taken from the monastery and executed by her father. Afterward, she led a dissolute private life, having extramarital affairs with the monks Zhixu and Huigong, and the Taoist priest Li Hu. After the death of Emperor Taizong, Princess Gaoyang "cried without mourning".

The affair is recorded in New Book of Tang and Zizhi Tongjian, written by Ouyang Xiu and Sima Guang, respectively, in the Song dynasty. All other records before the New Book of Tang do not mention this. Some scholars therefore question the story, suggesting that Ouyang Xiu and Sima Guang's accounts might have been influenced by their strong anti-Buddhist views. However, the Old Book of Tang, which was written in the Tang dynasty, mentions that when Gaoyang's father-in-law Fang Xuanling was in the last days of his life, he submitted a petition to the Emperor through Gaoyang. The records state that the relationship between the Emperor and the Princess was still in harmony. Additionally, the princess' name and courtesies were carved into Fang Xuanling's tomb with great honor.

== Later years and death ==
According to the New Book of Tang, Gaoyang became bitter after Bianji's death; her betrothal and wedding went as planned in spite of her protests. However, instead of animosity and resentment, Gaoyang and Fang Yi'ai grew closer and bonded over their mutual hatred for the imperial court. Gaoyang and her husband gathered an army and led a rebellion against her brother Emperor Gaozong and his wife Empress Wu Zetian. They stormed the palace but were stopped and captured. Gaoyang and her husband were executed by hanging shortly after.

== In popular culture ==
- Portrayed by Ma Li in the 1995 Chinese TV series Wu Zetian.
- Portrayed by Shen Aojun in the 2001 Chinese TV series Love Legend of the Tang Dynasty.
- Portrayed by Mi Lu in the 2014 Chinese TV series The Empress of China.
- Portrayed by Lin Xiaozhai in the 2025 video game Road to Empress
