= Bianji =

Tang dynasty Buddhist monk

- Traditional Chinese: 辯機
- Simplified Chinese: 辨机
Transcriptions
Standard Mandarin
- Hanyu Pinyin: Biàn Jī
- Wade–Giles: Pien Chi

Bianji (fl. 7th century) was a Buddhist monk who lived in the Tang dynasty. A disciple of Xuanzang, he compiled the Great Tang Records on the Western Regions and translated Sanskrit sutras into Chinese. He was executed by Emperor Taizong for having an illicit affair with the emperor's daughter Princess Gaoyang, though this is disputed.

== Life ==
According to the Record of Praises at the end of Volume 12 of the Record of the Western Regions of the Great Tang Dynasty, Bianji was born into a family of esteemed scholars. From a young age, he displayed a noble and upright character. As soon as he reached the age of study, he abandoned his worldly pursuits and entered the Great Monastery of Total Support, becoming a disciple of Master Daoyue, a renowned Dharma Master of the Sarvāstivāda school of Buddhism. He copied a vast number of Buddhist scriptures that are still in circulation today. He was renowned for his profound Buddhist cultivation, literary proficiency, and skill in writing.

He compiled the Records of the Western Regions of the Great Tang Dynasty from dictations by Xuanzang. He also assisted Xuanzang in translating important scriptures such as Exposition of the Sacred Doctrine (1 volume), the Six-Gate Dharani Sutra (1 volume), the Buddha-Ground Sutra (1 volume), the Questions of Heaven Sutra (1 volume), and seven volumes of the Stories of the Past.

The New Book of Tang, compiled by Ouyang Xiu, records that Bianji had a love affair with Princess Gaoyang, leading to his execution by Emperor Taizong. Sima Guang's account provides a more gruesome detail, stating that Bianji was executed by waist-cutting, a form of execution involving cutting the victim in half at the waist. Some scholars question the narrative of Bianji being killed by Taizong, suggesting that Ouyang Xiu and Sima Guang's positions are highly suspicious, as both of them held strong anti-Buddhist views, which could have influenced their portrayal of Bianji's death.

The alleged affair between Princess Gaoyang and the Buddhist monk Bianji is the most serious accusation against her and the reason for her bad reputation in history. However, an earlier historical work, the Old Book of Tang, does not mention this incident at all. Instead, it was written by the authoritative historians Ouyang Xiu and others in the New Book of Tang, a national history compiled by the Song dynasty a hundred years later. Therefore, since the reign of Emperor Renzong of Song, the story of Princess Gaoyang and Bianji has been considered to be true history, and it also marks the beginning of Princess Gaoyang's image as a promiscuous woman in historical materials. Nowadays, because there is no more detailed historical evidence to support it, although later researchers have raised various doubts and questions about this matter, they are still not enough to overturn the New Book of Tang's portrayal of Princess Gaoyang.
