= Zhang Mo (actor) =

Chinese actor (born 1982)

- 张默
- Born: July 28, 1982 (age 44); Chengdu, Sichuan, China
- Education: Central Academy of Drama
- Occupation: Actor
- Years active: 1997–present
- Agent: Huayi Brothers
- Parent(s): Zhang Guoli (father); Deng Jie (Stepmother); Luo Xiuchun (mother)

Chinese name
- Traditional Chinese: 張默
- Simplified Chinese: 张默
Transcriptions
Standard Mandarin
- Hanyu Pinyin: Zhāng Mò

Zhang Mo (Chinese: 张默; born 28 July 1982) is a Chinese actor.

Zhang is noted for his roles as Liuzi in the film Let the Bullets Fly (2011).

Zhang has won the Best New Actor Award at the Golden TVS Annual Award and Chinese Young Generation Film Forum, Outstanding Supporting Actor Award at the China Image Film Festival, and New Performer Award at the Golden Phoenix Award, and received BQ Celebrity Score Award and Chinese Film Media Award nominations for Favorite Actor.

== Early life ==
Zhang was born and raised in Chengdu, Sichuan, the son of Luo Xiuchun (simplified Chinese: 罗秀春; traditional Chinese: 羅秀春), an actress in Sichuan People's Art Theatre, and Zhang Guoli, a famous actor and director, Zhang's stepmother Deng Jie is also a famous actress.

Zhang graduated from Central Academy of Drama, where he majored in acting.

== Acting career ==
Zhang had his first experience in front of the camera in 1997, and he was chosen to act as a support actor in Kangxi Travels, a historical television series starring his parents Zhang Guoli and Deng Jie.

Zhang acted in many television series, such as Winter Is Not Cold, Marriageable Age, and New Legend of Ji Gong.

In 2004, Zhang had a supporting role in The Eloquent Ji Xiaolan, a historical comedy television series starring Zhang Guoli, Zhang Tielin, Wang Gang (actor) and Yuan Li.

After playing minor roles in various films and television series, Zhang received his first leading role in a film called Let the Bullets Fly, for which he won Best New Actor Award at the Chinese Young Generation Film Forum and New Performer Award at the Golden Phoenix Award.

In 2011, Zhang appeared in a romantic comedy film Love Is Not Blind, it was released in November 2011 and grossed US$56 million.

In 2012, Zhang participated in Back to 1942, which had its premiere at the International Rome Film Festival on 11 November 2012. At the same year, Zhang won the Outstanding Supporting Actor at the China Image Film Festival for his performance in Lethal Hostage, and was nominated for Favorite Actor Award at the BQ Celebrity Score Award.

== Filmography ==
=== Film ===
Year	English title	Chinese title	Role	Notes
2000	Because of love	因为有爱	Lin Hai	
2007	The World Second	天下第二	Zhuge Ming	
2007	There would be no New China without the CPC	没有共产党就没有新中国	Qian Liuzi	
2010	Let the Bullets Fly	让子弹飞	Liuzi	
2011	Love Is Not Blind	失恋33天		
2011	The Pretending Lovers	假装情侣	Momo	
2011	Very Kidnappers	非常绑匪	A Kai	
2012	Back to 1942	一九四二	Shuang Zhu	
2012	Inseparable	形影不离	Sun Biao	
2012	Lethal Hostage	边境风云	Policeman	
2013	Piano Trojan	钢琴木马	A Ming	

=== Television ===
Year	English title	Chinese title	Role	Notes
1997	Kangxi Travels	康熙微服私访记1	The beggar	
2000	Kangxi Travels 3	康熙微服私访记3	Hu Er	
2001	Winter Is Not Cold	冬天不冷	Xiao Cao	
2002	My This Life	我这一辈子	Shunzi	
2003	Shake off	挣脱	Shen Lin	
2004	Marriageable Age	豆蔻年华	guest	
2004		少年大钦差	Fengshen Yinde	
2004	Hail the Judge	新九品芝麻官	Lu Xiaofeng	
2004	The Eloquent Ji Xiaolan	铁齿铜牙纪晓岚3	Yuan Hong	
2005	Youth Jiaqing	少年嘉庆	Yongxing	
2005	New Legend of Ji Gong	济公新传	Ji Gong	
2005	Young Treasure Crown Prince	少年宝亲王	Hongzhou	
2005		龙非龙凤非凤	Guangxu Emperor	
2006	Call Mama Once	叫一声妈妈	Liu Weiqiang	
2007	Father's Flag	父辈的旗帜	Wan Hubao	
2008		侦探成旭	Xue Ran	
2008		守着阳光守着你	Yu Younan	
2008	My Wife Is a 'Fool'	我的老婆是傻瓜	Qin Ziwei	
2009	Sinful Debt 2	孽债2	Sheng Tianhua	
2009	Going South Sea	下南洋	Tang Atai	
2009	Graduation Time	毕业时刻	Duan Qiang	
2010	Xia Yan's Autumn	夏妍的秋天	Wang Xiaozhu	
2011	War of Desire	凰图腾	Emperor Yizong of Tang	
2013	Love Is Not Blind	失恋33天	Wang Yiyang	
2013		翻手为云覆手雨	Wei Youxuan	
2014	Ten Escort Red Army	十送红军		

== Awards ==
Year	Work	Award	Result	Notes
2007		Golden TVS Annual Award for Best New Actor	Won	
2011	Let the Bullets Fly	Golden Phoenix Award for New Performer	Won	
2011	Let the Bullets Fly	Chinese Young Generation Film Forum - Best New Actor	Won	
2012	Lethal Hostage	China Image Film Festival - Outstanding Supporting Actor	Won	
2012		BQ Celebrity Score Award for Favorite Actor	Nominated	
2013	Lethal Hostage	Chinese Film Media Award for Favorite Actor	Nominated	
2013		BQ Celebrity Score Award for Favorite Actor	Nominated	
