= Yuan Li =

Chinese actress (born 1973)

- 袁立
- Born: July 12, 1973 (age 52); Hangzhou, Zhejiang, China
- Other names: Yuan Li (袁莉)
- Education: Beijing Film Academy
- Occupation: Actress
- Years active: 1995–present
- Notable work: The Eloquent Ji Xiaolan; Never Close Eyes; Pure Sentiment
- Spouses: Zhao Ling (m. 2005–2007) Blaine Grunewald (m.2011–c.2015): Liang Taiping (m.2019)
- Awards: 18th China Golden Eagle Award for Best Supporting Actress; 2000 Never Close Eyes; 25th Hundred Flowers Award for Best Supporting Actress; 2002 Pure Sentiment

Yuan Li (Chinese: 袁立; pinyin: Yuán Lì; born 12 July 1973) is a Chinese actress and philanthropist.

Yuan rose to fame for her role in the television drama Never Close Eyes (1998), for which she won the Supporting Actress at the 18th Golden Eagle Awards. She starred in the four seasons of television series The Eloquent Ji Xiaolan (2002–2008) and won the Best Supporting Actress at the 20th Hundred Flowers Awards for her performance in the film Pure Sentiment (2002).

Since 2011, Yuan has shifted her focus to charitable work, including establishing the Yuan Li Foundation for pneumoconiosis patients—a sensitive topic in China due to its link to government negligence regarding workers’ rights. She converted to Christianity around 2013. Following years of increasingly outspoken views on social issues, religion, and the COVID-19 pandemic, her Weibo account was suspended in 2020, effectively blacklisting her in China. In 2021, her Twitter account was suspended after she expressed support for Donald Trump while attacking Joe Biden and his family

== Life ==
=== Early life ===
Yuan was born Yuan Li (袁莉; Yuán Lì) in Hangzhou, Zhejiang on July 12, 1973, with her ancestral home in Jiangyin, Jiangsu. She graduated from Beijing Film Academy, majoring in acting.

=== Acting career ===
Yuan had her first experience in front of the camera in 1996, and she was chosen to act as a support actor in History of Han Dynasty, a film starring Zhang Tielin.

After playing minor roles in various films and television series, Yuan rose to fame after portraying Ouyang Lanlan in the television series Never Close Eyes, alongside Lu Yi, she won the "Best Supporting Actress" at the 18th China Golden Eagle Awards.

In 2000, Yuan starred as Du Xiaoyue in The Eloquent Ji Xiaolan, a historical television series co-starring with Zhang Guoli, Zhang Tielin and Wang Gang, which were highly praised by audience.

In 2002, Yuan played the role of An Ran in Cao Baoping's film Pure Sentiment, for which she received a "Best Supporting Actress" at the 20th Hundred Flowers Awards.

In 2010, Yuan acted with Andy Lau and Gong Li in Chen Daming's film What Women Want.

On September 19, Yuan became a spokesperson of the Red Cross Society of China.

== Personal life ==
In 1993, Yuan met businessman Xu Wei (徐威), with whom she had a 12-year relationship until 2005. They had a rumored son born in the late 1990s, but they never confirmed.

Yuan married her first husband Zhao Ling (赵岭), a Chinese actor, on September 9, 2005. They divorced in 2007.

On November 30, 2011, Yuan married her second husband Blaine Willis Grunewald, a Canadian LDS missionary. Grunewald studied Chinese at Northeast Normal University from 2003 to 2004, and obtained a Bachelor of Laws from Fudan University in 2009. He briefly worked for Lehman Bush, a firm co-founded by Neil Bush and Edward Lehman. They divorced in 2015.

On 26 March 2019, Yuan announced that she had married her third husband Liang Taiping (梁太平), a poet.

== Filmography ==
=== Television ===
Year	English title	Chinese title	Role	Notes
1994		飞来横福	guest	
1996		英雄无悔	Wu Yinyin	
1996	History of Han Dynasty	汉宫飞燕	Consort Zhao Hede	
	Thunder Storm	雷雨	guest	
1997	Guess of Famen Temple	法门寺猜想	Yi Chun	
1998	Never Close Eyes	永不瞑目	Ouyang Lanlan	
1998	Long and Winding Road	锦绣前程	Zhao Lei	
1999	My Dear Country	我亲爱的祖国	Gao Baose	
1999		致使邂逅	Du Lala	
1999	The Eloquent Ji Xiaolan	铁齿铜牙纪晓岚	Du Xiaoyue	
2001	Date With Youth	相约青春	Ma Yeye	
2001	Black Hole	黑洞	Feng Leilei	
2001	The Eloquent Ji Xiaolan 2	铁齿铜牙纪晓岚2	Du Xiaoyue	
2002		玲珑女	Bai Fengyi	
2002		浮华背后	Mo Fei	
2002	Unhappy Marriage	啼笑因缘	Shen Fengxi	
2004	Zhao Jun Come Out The Frontier	昭君出塞	Zhuan Qu	
2004	Sigh of His Highness	一生为奴	Empress Dowager Cixi	
2004	The Story of Zhuo Er	卓尔的故事	Zhuo Er	
2005	Senior Colonel's Daughter	大校的女儿	Han Lin	
2006	My Home in Huanshang	家在洹上	Zhang Baolian	
2006	Gift of Love	爱的礼物	Lin Qiao	
2007	The King of Shanghai	上海王	Xiao Yuegui	
2008	The Queens	母仪天下	Wang Zhengjun	
2008		牟氏庄园	Jiang Zhen'guo	
2008	The Eloquent Ji Xiaolan 4	铁齿铜牙纪晓岚4	Du Xiaoyue	
2009	We Are Friends	朋友一场	Du Ximei	
2009	Marriage Battle	婚姻保卫战	Lan Xin	
2010	China in 1945: Chongqing Negotiations	中国1945之重庆风云	Soong Ching-ling	
2011		百年莞香	guest	
2011		极品男女	Zhou Tong	
2011	Mother, mother	母亲，母亲	Jin Guoxiu	

=== Film ===
Year	English title	Chinese title	Role	Notes
1993	The Flying Squad	飞虎队	Xiao Qing	
1994	Woman Flowers	女人花	Yan Zhi	
1997	An Unusual Love	非常爱情	Shu Xin	
2000	A Storm in a Teacup	大惊小怪	Xin Xinxin	
2002	Pure Sentiment	绝对情感	An Ran	
2003	The Law of Romance	警察有约	guest	
2007	The Story of Xi'an	西安故事	guest	
2010	What Women Want	我知女人心	Yan Ni	
2011		大格局	Zhang Hanzhi	
2012	The Last Tycoon	大上海	Ling Husheng	

== Awards ==
Year	Work	Award	Result	Notes
2000	Never Close Eyes	18th China Golden Eagle Award for Best Supporting Actress	Won	
2002	Pure Sentiment	25th Hundred Flowers Award for Best Supporting Actress	Won	
