= Hao Rong =

Chinese drama educator (born 1971)

- 郝戎

President of the Central Academy of Drama
- In office November 2018 – December 2025
- Preceded by: Xu Xiang

Personal details
- Born: August 1971 (age 55)
- Party: Chinese Communist Party (2001-)
- Education: Central Academy of Drama

Hao Rong (Chinese: 郝戎; born August 1971) is a Chinese drama educator, who served as the president of the Central Academy of Drama from 2018 to 2025.

He is a member of the 14th National Committee of the Chinese People's Political Consultative Conference.

== Career ==
Hao was born in August 1971. He was gradruated from the Central Academy of Drama in 1995, which majored in drama and theater studies. After gradruating, he was stayed at academy and served as the instructor in drama, film and television (musical) performance major. He was the head teacher of the class of 1996 in the academy, which trained some actors and actresses, including Zhang Ziyi, Liu Ye, Yuan Quan, Qin Hailu, and Mei Ting etc. In 1999, Hao was served as the first head teacher of the musical performance major in China.

In December 2003, Huang Dingyu (黄定宇), who was the deputy head of performance arts at that time, has been involved Zhang Mo assault incident. Hao was promoted to the head after Huang was detained for raping and dismissed from the post.

In August 2016, Hao was appointed as the vice president of the Central Academy of Drama. He was promoted to the president in November 2018.

Hao was directed a lot of stage plays, and he was also starred in some TV series.

== Investigation ==
On 19 December 2025, Hao was put under investigation for alleged "serious violations of discipline and laws" by the discipline inspection and supervision Group stationed at the Ministry of Education of the Central Commission for Discipline Inspection (CCDI) and Xuchang Supervisory Commission in Henan.
