= Tibetan Weiqi =

Tibetan board game

Tibetan Weiqi (or Tibetan Go), known in Tibetan as Zhe and considered a variant of Mig Mang, is a traditional board game historically played in the Tibetan region. A defining characteristic of the game is its preservation of the ancient practice of Zuozi. Furthermore, players are strictly prohibited from placing a stone on any intersection that has just been captured in the immediate preceding turn.

Mig Mang refers generally to board games or pieces in Tibetan, rather than exclusively designating Tibetan Go, as it encompasses various other traditional Tibetan board games—such as Paiqi (arrangement chess).

According to Dunhuang manuscripts found in the Mogao Caves, Namri Songtsen (the father of Songtsen Gampo) was highly accomplished in Tibetan Go and possessed exceptional skill. The records note that *"Whenever he played Go with others, if his opponent was on the verge of defeat in the middle of a game, he would assist them and help them secure victory." Tradition also holds that Khyungpo Pungse, a prominent minister under Songtsen Gampo, was a master of the game. Modern scholarly research suggests that Tibetan Go originated from the Weiqi of mainland China. It was introduced to Tibet at the latest during the early Tang dynasty and gradually evolved into its unique regional variant.

Following the death of the 5th Dalai Lama, the political rivalry between the Regent Sangye Gyatso and the Khoshut ruler Lhazang Khan intensified significantly. Recognizing that an all-out military conflict would cause mutual devastation, both parties weighed their options and agreed to settle their struggle for power over a series of Tibetan Go matches. After three rounds of intense intellectual confrontation, Sangye Gyatso lost the match and was subsequently executed by Lhazang Khan in 1705. In the wake of this tragedy, Tibetan Go came to be viewed by the Tibetan people as an ominous and ill-omened activity, causing the game to fall into a gradual and long-term decline.

In the mid-19th century, the Tibetan astronomer and calendarist Tenpa Gyatso composed a 32-page treatise dedicated entirely to the strategy and theory of the game, titled Mig Mang Gi Ten Chö (The Theory of Tibetan Go).

In November 1958, Palden Thondup Namgyal, who was then the Crown Prince of Sikkim, visited Japan and played a match of Tibetan Go with the Japanese professional Go player Iyamoto Momoichi.

== Equipment ==
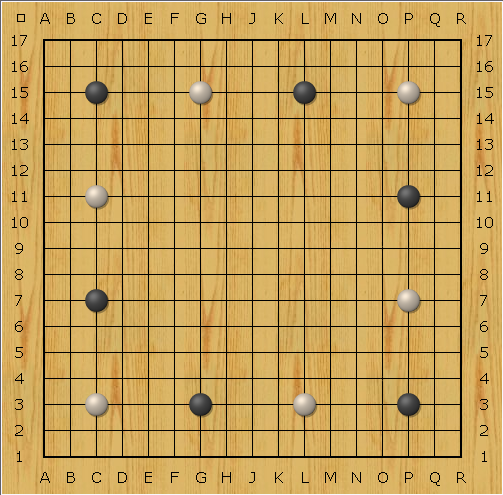
Initial placement of starting stones (Zuozi) in Tibetan Go

The game is played on a 17×17 grid board. Standard black and white Go stones are used as playing pieces.

== Rules ==
- Before the game commences, both players must position six starting stones (Zuozi) on the board.
  - Coordinates for White's starting stones: c3, c11, g15, l3, p7, p15.
  - Coordinates for Black's starting stones: c7, c15, g3, l15, p3, p11.
  - White occupies the 1-1 corner intersections at the bottom-right and top-left; Black occupies the 1-1 corner intersections at the top-right and bottom-left.
- Players take turns placing one stone at a time, with White playing first.
- A player is strictly prohibited from playing a stone on any intersection where a stone has just been captured and removed in the immediate preceding turn.
- Occupying or completely surrounding both of the opponent's 1-1 corner intersections awards an additional bonus of 20 points (points/mok).
- Occupying or completely surrounding the center point (Tengen) awards an additional bonus of 5 points (points/mok).
- Other general rules largely align with those of ancient Chinese Weiqi.

== Terminology ==
- Gong: The center point or Tengen.
- Bo: The starting stones or Zuozi.
- Ju: The playing stones (pieces).
- Jiangju: "Thoroughbred horse stone," a term used to describe a strategically excellent move.
- Pangju: "Donkey stone," a term used to describe a poor or blundering move.
- Jiaqia: Handicap stones (handicap system).
- Zejiegongjie: A catastrophic loss of 25 points, resulting from the opponent successfully occupying or surrounding both the Tengen and two of one's 1-1 corners.
- Dalaxiawajiachia: "Eight Deer," a tactical formation where eight stones are used along the side lines (edges) to form two viable eyes.
- Zelanienmozhuqia: "Six Fish," a tactical formation where six stones are used in a corner area to form two viable eyes.
- Mimangdiwunishula, Langchindamiswoganai: "Fierce Elephant," a metaphor used to describe a solid tactical shape formed by two horizontally or vertically connected stones.
