= Gar Tagu Risum =

Gar Tagu Risum (Tibetan: མགར་སྟ་གུ་རི་ཟུམ, Wylie: mgar sta gu ri sum, ? – ?) was a general of the Tibetan Empire. He was the fourth son of minister Gar Tongtsen Yülsung. In Chinese records, his name was given as Xīduōyú (Chinese: 悉多于).

According to Old Tibetan Annals, his eldest brother Gar Tsenye Dompu came into conflict with another minister Gar Mangnyen Taktsab in 685, and was killed by a river in Sumpa. Tagu's another brother Gar Trinring Tsendro came into power. Tagu put down a rebellion in rtsang chen together with Trinring in 687.

In 692, the Chinese troops led by Wang Xiaojie invaded Tibet in order to recapture the lost land: Four Garrisons of Anxi. Tagu fought together with his brothers Trinring, Tsenyen Gungton, and Western Turks' khan Ashina Tuizi (阿史那俀子). Tibetan was defeated in this battle. Two years later, Chinese invaded Tibet again, and defeated Tibetan troops near Qinghai Lake. Tagu fled but was captured by Sogdian people.
