= Zhang Mo =

Zhang Mo is the name of:

- Zhang Mo (actor) (born 1982), Chinese actor
- Zhang Mo (director) (born 1983), Chinese filmmaker
- Zhang Mo (table tennis) (born 1989), Chinese-born Canadian table tennis player
