= Lun Gongren =

Chinese general

Lun Gongren (simplified Chinese: 论弓仁; traditional Chinese: 論弓仁, 663–723) was a general of China during the Tang dynasty and Wu Zetian's Zhou dynasty.

Lun was a Tibetan, his Tibetan name was Gar Mangpoje (Tibetan: མགར་མང་བུ་རྗེ, Wylie: mgar mang po rje). After his father Gar Trinring Tsendro was purged by the young king Tridu Songtsen, he surrendered to China together with his uncle Gar Tsenba. Later, he served as a famous general of China.
