= Gar Tsenba =

General of the Tibetan Empire from the 600s CE

Gar Tsenba (Tibetan: མགར་བཙན་བ, Wylie: mgar btsan ba, –?), also known as Gar Trintsan Tsangtong (Tibetan: མགར་འབྲིང་རྩན་རྩང་སྟོང, Wylie: mgar 'bring rtsan rtsang stong), was a general of the Tibetan Empire. He was the third son of minister Gar Tongtsen Yülsung. In Chinese records, his name was given as Lùn Zànpó (simplified Chinese: 论赞婆; traditional Chinese: 論贊婆) or Zànpó (simplified Chinese: 赞婆; traditional Chinese: 贊婆).

He was sent to 'A-zha to defend against Tang China after his father's death. In 681, he invaded Tang China in 681, but was defeated in Liangfeichuan (良非川) by Heukchi Sangji. His brother Gar Trinring Tsendro succeeded as the new Great Minister in 667, thus Tsenba was also appointed as one of high ministers. According to Old Tibetan Annals, in 690, Tsenba corrected taxes in g.yo ru (a place in modern Nêdong District, Shannan, Tibet) together with ba tsab rgyal tsan thong bo.

The Chinese troops led by Wang Xiaojie and Lou Shide invaded Tibet in 696, but was fully beaten by Tsenba and his brother Gar Trinring. After this battle, Trinring had a very high reputation in Tibet. The young king, Tridu Songtsen, realised that members of the Gar family had become independent warlords and posed a threat to the central authority of the king. In 699, the king pretended to organise a great hunt and then had his men turn on members of the Gar and their supporters. Trinring had to commit suicide, and the Gar family were purged by the young king. After hearing about this, Tsenba surrendered to China together with his nephew Mangpoje (known as Lun Gongren (論弓仁) by Chinese). The Chinese empress Wu Zetian was very happy, and met him personally and titled him Tejin (特進), Right Guard Senior General (右衛大將軍), and Prince of Guide Commandery (歸德郡王). He and his Tibetan troops were sent to Changsong (昌松, in modern Wuwei, Gansu) to defend against Tibet.

Tsenpa was regarded as the most dangerous traitor by Tibet. In 700, the Tibetan general Khu Mangpoje invaded Liangzhou, and put Changsong under siege in order to vanquish him, but was fully beaten by Chinese general Tang Xiujing.

Tsenba was posthumously titled protector general of Anxi (安西大都護), the highest commandant of Protectorate General to Pacify the West, by Chinese court after his death.
