= Zhang Tielin =

Chinese actor and film director (born 1957)

- 張鐵林
- Born: 15 June 1957 (age 69); Tangshan, Hebei, China
- Education: Beijing Film Academy (BFA)
- Occupations: Actor, film director
- Years active: 1979–present
- Children: Zhang Yueliang (daughter, b. 1991)

Chinese name
- Traditional Chinese: 張鐵林
- Simplified Chinese: 张铁林
Transcriptions
Standard Mandarin
- Hanyu Pinyin: Zhāng Tiělín
Yue: Cantonese
- Jyutping: Zoeng1 Tit3-lam4
- Musical career
- Also known as: Cheung Tit-lam (Cantonese romanisation)

Zhang Tielin (born 15 June 1957) is a Chinese-British actor and film director. He is best known for portraying the Qianlong Emperor in the first two seasons of My Fair Princess and in the four seasons of The Eloquent Ji Xiaolan.

== Early life and education ==
Zhang was born in Tangshan, China and grew up in Weinan. In 1973, he was sent to Lintong District, Xi'an to perform agricultural labour as part of the Chinese government's Down to the Countryside Movement. Three years later, he became a construction worker in Xi'an.

In 1978, Zhang enrolled in the Beijing Film Academy and graduated in 1982, after which he worked in the television station Tianjin Television. In 1984, Zhang made his debut in the films The Burning of Imperial Palace, Reign Behind a Curtain and Under the Bridge, of which the third one propelled him to fame.

== Career ==
In 1987, Zhang went to England to further his studies at the British Film Institute and he graduated in 1990. He became a British citizen in 1997. In the early 1990s, Zhang went to Hong Kong to expand his career and signed a contract with film producer Tsui Hark, working together with Tsui on the Once Upon a Time in China film series. He joined the Hong Kong television network Phoenix Television in 1996 and worked there briefly before returning to the Chinese entertainment industry. His portrayal of the Qianlong Emperor in the first two seasons of the television series My Fair Princess boosted his fame. Zhang starred together with actors Wang Gang and Zhang Guoli in many television series and they are collectively known as the "Iron Triangle" in the Chinese entertainment industry.

In 2007, Zhang became the dean of the art school of Jinan University in Guangzhou.

== Personal life ==
In 1987, Zhang met a Polish girl while studying at the British Film Institute. In September 1991, she gave birth to a daughter on the Mid-Autumn Festival and Zhang named her daughter "Zhang Yueliang" (张月亮).

== Filmography ==
=== Film ===
Year	Title	Role	Notes
1983	Under the Bridge 大桥下面	Gao Zhihua	
1984	Duocai De Chenguang 多彩的晨光	Lin Lishuang	
1984	The Burning of Imperial Palace 火烧圆明园	Prince Gong	
1984	Reign Behind a Curtain 垂帘听政	Yisu	
1991	Once Upon a Time in China II 黄飞鸿之男儿当自强	Sun Yat-sen	
1993	Xianhe Shenzhen 仙鹤神针	Cao Xiong	
1994	Once Upon a Time in China V 黄飞鸿之龙城歼霸	Chief constable Xie Sibao	
1995	Man from China 椅子		director
1999	Xin Duguo Choucheng 新赌国仇城	Chou Yisen	
1999	The Lion King II: Simba's Pride	Simba	Mandarin dub
2009	The Silver Valley 白银帝国	Old Master Kang	
2009	Astro Boy	Dr. Tenma	Mandarin dub
2012	Qian Xuesen 钱学森	Mao Zedong	
2012	The Southern Storm 南方大冰雪		

=== Television ===
Year	Title	Role	Notes
1979	You Yige Qingnian 有一个青年	Gu Minghua	
1985	Sanyuedi De Chuchun 三月地的初春		
1996	Hangong Feiyan 汉宫飞燕	Emperor Cheng of Han	
1997	Dongbei Yijiaren 东北一家人		
1997	My Fair Princess 还珠格格	Qianlong Emperor	
1998	Hua Mulan 花木兰	Jade Emperor	
1998	The Female Official 女巡按	Wen Bizheng	guest star
1999	Biezou Woaini 别走我爱你	Wang Zong	
1999	Ghost Tales 聊斋先生	Pu Songling	
1999	My Fair Princess II 还珠格格2	Qianlong Emperor	
2000	Wrong Carriage, Right Groom 上错花轿嫁对郎	Emperor	
2001	Lü Buwei: Hero in Times of Disorder 乱世英雄吕不韦	Lü Buwei	
2001	The Bronze Teeth 铁齿铜牙纪晓岚	Qianlong Emperor	
2001	Taiji Prodigy 少年张三丰	Master Chengkong	
2001	Mingbu Zhen Guandong 名捕震关东	Jiajing Emperor	
2002	Book and Sword, Gratitude and Revenge 书剑恩仇录	Yu Wanting	
2002	The Bronze Teeth II 铁齿铜牙纪晓岚2	Qianlong Emperor	
2002	Qing Dynasty God of Medicine 大清药王	Yue Hongda	
2002	Longfeng Qiyuan 龙凤奇缘	Qianlong Emperor	
2003	Eighteen Monks 十八罗汉	Abbot	
2003	The Vicissitudes of Life 人生几度秋凉	Fu Silong	
2003	The Heaven Sword and Dragon Saber 倚天屠龙记	Yang Xiao	
2003	Huoshuai 火帅	Emperor Renzong of Song	
2003	The Return of Justice Bao 包公出巡	Emperor Renzong of Song	
2003	Buyi Tianzi 布衣天子	Qianlong Emperor	
2004	Buyi Zhixian Fan Ruhua 布衣知县梵如花	Sanjueluo	
2004	The Bronze Teeth III 铁齿铜牙纪晓岚3	Qianlong Emperor	
2004	Canghai Bainian 沧海百年	Fuk'anggan	
2004	The 36th Chamber of Shaolin 南少林三十六房	Yongzheng Emperor	
2004	Da Tang Fu Rong Yuan 大唐芙蓉园	Li Bai	guest star
2004	The Phantasmal Angel 幻影天使	Wang Zhengzhong	
2004	The Perfect Banquet 满汉全席	Kangxi Emperor	
2004	Aroma in Autumn 五月槐花香	Fan Shirong	
2004	Yuqian Sibao 御前四宝	Shunzhi Emperor	
2004	Assassinator Jing Ke 荆轲传奇	Lü Buwei	
2004	Miracle Healers 神医侠侣	Xing Shan	
2004	Yuanlai Jiushi Ni 原来就是你	Yi Zhengbang	
2005	The Juvenile Qianlong Emperor 少年宝亲王	Ye Xu	
2005	Song Liansheng Zuotang 宋莲生坐堂	Shunzhi Emperor	
2005	Crazy King and General Iron 铁将军阿贵	Qianlong Emperor	
2005	The Great Dunhuang 大敦煌	Qing governor	guest star
2005	Yingxiong Zhi 英雄志	Wuying Emperor	
2006	Fly with Me 想飞	Han Kai	
2006	Canjian Zhen Jianghu 残剑震江湖	Yan Kang	
2006	Empress Dowager Feng of Northern Wei 北魏冯太后	Emperor Taiwu of Northern Wei	
2006	Feichang Fuqi 非常夫妻	Yan Yuedong	
2006	Emerald on the Roof 屋顶上的绿宝石	Ling Xinfu	
2006	The Legendary Warrior 薛仁贵传奇	Li Daozong	
2006	Carol of Zhenguan 贞观长歌	Luo Yi	
2007	Wu Zi Bei Ge 无字碑歌	Emperor Gaozong of Tang	
2008	Zhongli Xun Ta Qianbaidu 众里寻她千百度	Lin Haitao	
2008	The Bronze Teeth IV 铁齿铜牙纪晓岚4	Qianlong Emperor	
2009	Huang Yanpei 黄炎培	Huang Yanpei	
2010	Mudan Ting 牡丹亭	Emperor Gaozong of Song	
2010	Baijiaxing Chuanshuo 百家姓传说	Yanhuang	
2011	All Men Are Brothers 水浒传	Marshal Hong	
2011	Modeng Xin Renlei 摩登新人类	Xie Leizhen	
2011	Heise Mingdan 黑色名单	Liu Zhiqi	
2011	Zhongguo 1945 Zhi Chongqing Fengyun 中国1945之重庆风云	Huang Yanpei	
2011	Bainian Wanxiang 百年莞香		
2011	Huguo Junhun Chuanqi 护国军魂传奇	Zhang Taiyan	
2011	Mu Guiying Takes Command 穆桂英挂帅	Emperor Zhenzong of Song	
2011	Bo Yi 博弈	Bi Zhenzhong	
2012	Management Marriage 经营婚姻	Qingniao's father	
2012	Red Army Expedition East 红军东征	Mao Zedong	
2012	The Legend of the Huangmei Opera Grandmaster 黄梅戏宗师传奇	Qianlong Emperor	
2012	Gandong Shengming 感动生命	Guan Mingmei	
2012	Dao Ying 刀影		
2012	Shuxiang 书香		
2012	Wenfang Sibao 文房四宝		
