= Khyungpo Pungse Sutse =

General of the Tibetan Empire

Tibetan name
- Tibetan: ཁྱུང་པོ་སྤུང་སད་ཟུ་ཙེས་
Transcriptions
- Wylie: khyung po spung sad zu tses
- THL: khyung po büng sé zu tsé

Khyungpo Pungse Sutse (Tibetan: ཁྱུང་པོ་སྤུང་སད་ཟུ་ཙེས་, Wylie: khyung po spung sad zu tses, ? – ?) was a general of the Tibetan Empire.

Born in Khyungpo (modern Dêngqên and Biru in Kham). He killed his own regions king and surrendered his loyalty to the Tibetan king, Namri Songtsen. He was so witty that Namri Songtsen put great trust in him.

Pungse continued to serve as high minister after Songtsen Gampo ascended the throne. At that time, the Tibetan king and the king of Zhangzhung had married each other's sister in a political alliance. However, sad mar gar, Songtsen's sister who had married the Zhangzhung king, rig myi rhya, complained of poor treatment by the king's principal wife. Angry, Songtsen prepared to invade Zhangzhung, and let Pungse to predict the outcome. The oracle predicted a major victory. Songtsen led a large number of troops in an invasion of Zhangzhung in 642, and many high ministers participated in the mission, including Khyungpo Pungse and Gar Tongtsen. After three years of bloody war, Zhangzhung was finally conquered by Tibet, and Pungse was appointed as the governor of Zhangzhung.

The Lönchen Nyang Mangpoje Shangnang had a very high reputation in Tibet. Songtsen realised this could be a threat to his central authority. Pungse notified this, sowed discord among them. It was a successful conspiracy; Shangnang returned to his castle, and was considered a rebel. Songtsen's troops occupied the castle, captured Shangnang and executed him.

Later, Pungse was appointed as Lönchen, but came into conflict with another high minister, Omade Lotsen. Pungse was dismissed due to his age, and had to retire to his castle. There, Pungse plotted another conspiracy. He invited Songtsen to visit his fief, then tried to murder him. Songtsen agreed, and sent Gar Tongtsen to set up his camp. The conspiracy was detected by Tongtsen, who fled stealthily and told the king about the conspiracy. Finding Tongtsen had disappeared, Pungse had to commit suicide.

His son ngag re kyung cut off his head, brought it to Songtsen, exposed the conspiracy, and asked for absolution. All members of the Khyungpo clan were therefore granted forgiveness by Songtsen Gampo.

Political offices
Preceded by Gar Mangsham Sumnang	"Lönchen" of Tibet ? – ?	Succeeded by Gar Tongtsen Yülsung
