= Sigh of His Highness =

- DVD cover art
- Also known as: The Legend of Prince Gong
- 一生为奴 / 恭亲王传奇
- Genre: Historical drama
- Written by: Yang Xiaoxiong; Gu Yi; Liu Shaoling
- Directed by: Li Wenlong
- Presented by: Shu Zhan; Li Ming; Zhao Qi; Guo Changjian
- Starring: Chen Baoguo; Yuan Li; Wang Yan; Wang Gang; Qin Yan; Song Jia; Luo Xiangjin
- Theme music composer: Anson Hu; Liang Jijue; Tan Yizhe
- Opening theme: "Hero's Burial" (葬英雄) by Anson Hu
- Ending theme: "Spring" (春天) by Leo Ku
- Composers: Jiang Jianyi; Zhou Zhihua
- Country of origin: China
- Original language: Mandarin
- No. of episodes: 40

Production
- Executive producers: Chen Wenguang; Chen Tanwen; Ling Li; Zhong Lifang; Zou Xiaoli; Wang Manlin
- Producers: Gao Zhiqiang; Yang Ziqing; Chen Yuguang; Jing Shuiqing; Zhang Huiling; Han Xueyi; Zhao Hua
- Production location: China
- Cinematography: Bu Xiangyi; Kong Jinsheng
- Editors: Yuan Fei; Dai Tao; Zhu Jun; Wang Shen
- Running time: ≈45 minutes per episode
- Production companies: Fujian Radio Film and TV Group; Shanghai Soft-Trek Culture Media; Beijing Galloping Horse Film & TV Production; Wuzhou Media Centre; Anhui TV

Original release
- Network: Sichuan Radio and Television
- Release: 26 March 2006 – 2006

Sigh of His Highness (一生为奴), also known as The Legend of Prince Gong (恭亲王传奇), is a Chinese historical television series based on the life of Prince Gong, an influential Manchu prince and statesman of the late Qing dynasty. The series was directed by Li Wenlong and starred Chen Baoguo as Prince Gong. It was first broadcast on Sichuan TV in China in 2006.

== Synopsis ==
The series is set in 19th-century China during the Qing dynasty. Prince Gong has a strained relationship with his half-brother, the Xianfeng Emperor, because they previously competed for the succession to their father's throne.

In 1860, when the Anglo-French forces close in on Beijing during the Second Opium War, the Xianfeng Emperor flees to the Chengde Summer Palace and orders Prince Gong to remain in Beijing to make peace with the enemy. After enduring humiliation and manoeuvring his way through complex negotiations, Prince Gong signs the Convention of Beijing on behalf of the Qing Empire with the British, French and Russians. With this achievement, he not only improves his political standing in the imperial court, but also earns the respect of the foreigners.

The following year, the Xianfeng Emperor dies in Chengde. His young son, Zaichun, succeeds him as the Tongzhi Emperor. Before his death, the Xianfeng Emperor had appointed the senior minister Sushun and seven others to serve as regents for his son until he is old enough to rule on his own.

In November 1861, with support from the Empresses Dowager Cixi and Ci'an, Prince Gong launches the Xinyou Coup and succeeds in seizing power from Sushun and the regents. In the next four years, Prince Gong reaches the pinnacle of his political career as he is appointed Prince-Regent and placed in charge of important state and military affairs, including control over the Grand Council. He also has the opportunity to take the throne but refrains from doing so. He spearheads the Self-Strengthening Movement and introduces new policies in his attempts to modernise China and maintain friendly relations with other countries.

Over the years, however, Prince Gong's relationship with Empress Dowager Cixi deteriorates as she becomes more power-hungry and he starts distancing himself from her. At the same time, the Empress Dowager's position in the imperial court gradually becomes more prominent, especially after the death of her son, the Tongzhi Emperor. The Tongzhi Emperor's cousin Zaitian, who succeeds him as the Guangxu Emperor, becomes a puppet ruler under Empress Dowager Cixi's control. Over time, Empress Dowager Cixi consolidates power in her hands and becomes the sole de facto ruler when her co-regent, Empress Dowager Ci'an, dies under mysterious circumstances. Prince Gong's standing in the imperial court declines as Empress Dowager Cixi increasingly distrusts him and gradually reduces his power by removing him from key appointments.

In 1885, Prince Gong falls from grace after shouldering the blame for the Grand Council's indecisiveness on whether to fight or make peace during the Sino-French War. As a consequence, Empress Dowager Cixi relieves him from his appointments and forces him to retire. In 1894, following the outbreak of the First Sino-Japanese War, Prince Gong returns to the imperial court to handle the crisis. However, despite his efforts, he fails to prevent another Qing defeat at the hands of the Japanese. He eventually dies of illness four years later.

== Cast ==
- Chen Baoguo as Prince Gong
- Yuan Li as Empress Dowager Cixi
- Wang Gang as Sengge Rinchen
- Wang Yan as Jiajia
- Song Jia as Empress Dowager Ci'an
- Qin Yan as Sushun
- Du Zhiguo as the Daoguang Emperor
- Wang Huichun as Zuo Zongtang
- Dai Chunrong as Empress Xiaoquancheng
- Luo Xiangjin as Suyi
- Wang Hui as the Xianfeng Emperor
- Xu Qiwen as Ming'er
- Lu Yong as Baojun
- Liu Wei as Wenxiang
- Feng Shaofeng as Ronglu
- Xi Huiling as Rong'er
- Bai Qinglin as Consort Li
- Pan Hongliang as An Dehai
- Wang Gang as Prince Chun
- Zeng Ang as Li Lianying
- Shen Tonghua as Li Hongzhang
- Gu Yang as the Tongzhi Emperor
  - Wan Changhao as the Tongzhi Emperor (younger)
- Wang Zhongwei as He Fan
- Xu Guang as Zaicheng
  - Dai Yun as Zaicheng (younger)
- Xia Zhixiang as Cao Yuying
- Kelin as Hede
- Wang Jianguo as Guiliang
- Guo Dong as Zeng Guofan
- Zhang Bingqi as Zhu Xueqin
- Hong Yin as Li Hongzao
- Yue Ding as Zaiyuan
- Yao Jianming as Duanhua
- Ni Jiali as Yuzi
- Tu Liman as Bailing
  - Zhu Li as Bailing (younger)
- Ren Xihong as Zeng Guoquan
- Huang Wei as Woren
- Dong Zhongcheng as Xu Tong
- Zhang Wenyi as Weng Tonghe
- Zhao Le as Prince Dun
- Shi Jipu as Jia Zhen
- Jin Bo as the Guangxu Emperor
- Gao Wei as Shengbao
- Mi Yang as Empress Jiashun
- Li Xiang as Zhiduan
- Zhang Lei as Zhenling
- Cai Xuan as Shuiling
- Anatoly Shanin as Harry Smith Parkes

== Broadcasts ==
Hong Kong's TVB Jade first aired the series on weekday nights from 26 April 2007. Starting on 12 May, the series was broadcast on weekend afternoons instead. On 24 June, TVB stopped airing the series and the remaining episodes were broadcast from 1 September to 16 October 2008 on weekday nights.
