= Gar Tongtsen Yulsung =

General of the Tibetan Empire

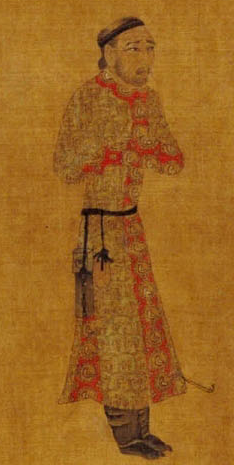
- Gar Tongtsen Yulsung

Tibetan name
- Tibetan: མགར་སྟོང་བཙན་ཡུལ་སྲུང
Transcriptions
- Wylie: mgar stong btsan yul srung
- THL: gar tong tsen yül sung

Gar Tongtsen Yulsung (Tibetan: མགར་སྟོང་བཙན་ཡུལ་སྲུང༌།, Wylie: mgar stong btsan yul srung; Chinese: 噶爾·東贊域松; 590–667) was a general of the Tibetan Empire who served as Lönchen during the reign of Songtsen Gampo. In many Chinese records, his name was given as Lù Dōngzàn (Chinese: 祿東贊) or Lùn Dōngzàn (Chinese: 論東贊); both are attempts to transliterate the short form of his title and name, Lön Tongtsen.

== Career ==
Gar Tongtsen was born into the Gar clan, an important Tibetan family based in modern Maizhokunggar County.

According to Clear Mirror on Royal Genealogy, Tongtsen was dispatched as envoys to Licchavi Kingdom (in modern Nepal) together with Thonmi Sambhota by the emperor Songtsen Gampo. Amshuverma, who was the ruler of Licchavi, married Princess Bhrikuti to Songtsen Gampo. But the historicity of the princess is not certain because no reference to her has been found among the documents discovered at Dunhuang.

Tongtsen was dispatched to the Tang dynasty together with Dri Seru Gungton and Thonmi Sambhota in 640, requesting a marriage between the Tibetan emperor and a Tang princess. Taizong, the Tang emperor, agreed and married Princess Wencheng to Songtsen Gampo. Taizong appreciated his talent and promoted him to "Right Guard Senior General" (右衛大將軍), but was refused by him.

Later, the Lönchen Khyungpo Pungse invited Songtsen came to visit his fief. Tongtsen was sent there to set up the emperor's camp, but found it was a conspiracy. Tongtsen fled stealthily and told the conspiracy to the emperor. After the death of Pungse, Tongtsen was appointed as Lönchen.

Songtsen Gampo died in 650, and Mangsong Mangtsen succeeded. Tongtsen acted as regent because Mangsong was an infant. During this period, Tongtsen carried out a tax reform in 653, conducted a census in 654, and made the first law of Tibet in 655. Relations between China and Tibet began to sour during this period. Tibet conquered glo po (Ngari) and rcang rgya (Tsang) in 652, and finally Azha (which was called "Tuyunhun" by Chinese people) in 663. Tibet held over the whole of the Tibetan plateau, and tried to seize the Western Regions of Tang China.

Tongtsen left in Azha to defend against Tang China, and was dismissed by Mangsong due to his age. Not long after his successor Omade Lotsen was executed because the "guilty of rebellion", and the position turned back to him. Six years later, he died of neck cancer on his way back to Lhasa.

== Family ==
Gar Tongtsen had five sons, all of them were famous Tibetan generals:

- Gar Tsenye Dompu (Wylie: mgar btsan snya ldom pu)
- Gar Trinring Tsendro (Wylie: mgar khri 'bring brtan brod), also known as Lon Trinring (Wylie: blon khri 'bring) and Lùn Qīnlíng (Chinese: 論欽陵)
- Gar Tsenba (Wylie: mgar btsan-ba)
- Gar Tagu Risum (Wylie: mgar sta gu ri sum)
- Gar Tsenyen Gungton (Wylie: mgar btsan nyan gung rton)

Political offices
Preceded by Khyungpo Pungse Sutse	Lönchen of Tibet; 652 – 659?	Succeeded by Omade Lotsen
Preceded by Omade Lotsen	Lönchen of Tibet; 661 – 667	Succeeded by Shanglon Tromo (acting)
