= Damdoi =

Coordinates: 31°11′N 95°22′E

Damdoi (Tibetan: གཏམ་སྟོད་; Chinese: 当堆乡) is a township in Dêngqên County, in the Tibet Autonomous Region of China. It lies at an altitude of 3,789 metres. It has a population of about 5,912 (2008).

== See also ==
- List of township-level divisions of the Tibet Autonomous Region
