= The Heaven Sword and Dragon Saber (2003 TV series) =

2003 Chinese-Taiwanese TV series

- Poster
- Also known as: Kungfu Master
- 倚天屠龙记
- Genre: Wuxia
- Based on: The Heaven Sword and Dragon Saber by Jin Yong
- Screenplay by: Chen Bing; Zhang Jing; Wei Xin
- Directed by: Lai Shui-ching
- Presented by: Yang Weiguang; Han Junfeng; Ye Qing
- Starring: Alec Su; Alyssa Chia; Gao Yuanyuan; Florence Tan; Phyllis Quek; Zhang Guoli; Zhang Tielin; Elvis Tsui; Wang Gang; Chen Zihan; Tao Hong
- Opening theme: "Heart, Love" (心爱) by Jin Xuefeng
- Ending theme: "Fall in Love with Zhang Wuji" (爱上张无忌) by Mao Amin
- Composer: Chen Tao
- Countries of origin: China; Taiwan
- Original language: Mandarin
- No. of episodes: 40

Production
- Executive producers: Bian Xiaojun; Yin Lianzhao; Liu Dehong
- Producers: Bian Xiaojun; Zhang Zhang
- Production location: China
- Running time: ≈45 minutes per episode
- Production company: Beijing Asia Central Audio Productions

Original release
- Network: CTS
- Release: 25 December 2002 – 27 February 2003

The Heaven Sword and Dragon Saber (倚天屠龙记) is a 2003 Chinese–Taiwanese wuxia television series adapted from the novel of the same title by Jin Yong. Directed by Lai Shui-ching, it starred an ensemble cast from mainland China, Taiwan and Singapore. The series was first broadcast in Taiwan on CTS from December 2002 to February 2003.

== Cast ==
- Alec Su as Zhang Wuji / Zhang Cuishan
  - Ashton Chen as Zhang Wuji (child)
- Alyssa Chia as Zhao Min
- Gao Yuanyuan as Zhou Zhiruo
- Florence Tan as Xiaozhao
- Chen Zihan as Yin Li
- Yu Wenzhong as Zhang Sanfeng
- Zhang Tielin as Yang Xiao
- Bao Yilin as Yang Buhui
  - Zhang Yijing as Yang Buhui (child)
- Phyllis Quek as Yin Susu
- Elvis Tsui as Xie Xun
- Zhang Guoli as Cheng Kun
- Wang Gang as the Seventh Prince
- Tao Hong as Ji Xiaofu
- Yan Minqiu as Miejue
- Yan Qingyu as Daiqisi
- Wang Gang as Song Yuanqiao
- Liu Hengyu as Song Qingshu
- Li Jinrong as Yu Lianzhou
- Liu Quan as Yu Daiyan
- Li Shengyu as Zhang Songxi
- Han Fuyi as Yin Liting
- Ma Qiang as Mo Shenggu
- Ji Qilin as Yin Tianzheng
- Liu Chunxiang as Yin Yewang
- Liu Changsheng as Wei Yixiao
- Li Lianyi as Zhou Dian
- Ma Zhaogang as Shuobude
- Xie Jiaqi as Leng Qian
- Fu Heng as Chang Yuchun
- Yuan Yuan as Fan Yao
- Deli Ge'er as Chaghan Temur
- Yang Guang as Wang Baobao
- Sun Bin as Chen Youliang
- Lin Jinfeng as Zhu Yuanzhang
- Du Yuming as Lu Zhangke
- Jin Song as He Biweng
- Shen Baoping as He Taichong
- Li Qingxiang as Zhu Changling
- Zhan Xiaonan as Zhu Jiuzhen
- Liu Wen as Wu Qingying
- Hao Aiming as Wei Bi
- Lin Jing as Ding Minjun
- Liang Tian as Hu Qingniu
- Dong Xiaoyan as Wang Nangu
- Hu Xiaoran as the Yellow Dress Maiden
