= Gar Tsenyen Gungton =

Gar Tsenyen Gungton (Tibetan: མགར་བཙན་ཉེན་གུང་སྟོན, Wylie: mgar btsan nyan gung rton, ? – 695) was a general of the Tibetan Empire. He was the fifth son of Minister Gar Tongtsen Yulsung. In Chinese records, his name was given as Bólùn Zànrèn (simplified Chinese: 勃论赞刃; traditional Chinese: 勃論贊刃) or Lùn Zànrèn (simplified Chinese: 论赞刃; traditional Chinese: 論贊刃), both of which attempted to transliterate the short form of his title and name, Lön Tsenyen (བློན་བཙན་ཉེན).

In 692, the Tang Chinese Troops invaded Tibet in order to recapture the lost land: Four Garrisons of Anxi. Gungton fought together with his brothers. Trinring Tsendro, Tagu Risum, and the Western Turks' khan, Ashina Tuizi (阿史那俀子). Tibetan was defeated in the battle. Two years later, Tibetan was defeated by a chinese general, Wang Xiaojie near Qinghai Lake, Gungton and Ashina Tuizi had to flee back to Tibet.

The young king, Tridu Songtsen, had realised that members of the Gar family had become independent warlords and posed a threat to the central authority of the king for a long time. Tridu Songtsen was very angry about this defeat and tried to weaken their influence, and Gungton realised it soon. According to the Old Tibetan Annals, Gungton launched a rebellion against the young king in the next year. The young king led troops personally, quickly put down the rebellion. Gungton was captured and executed.
