= The Big Life =

- Genre: Life-inspirational drama
- Written by: Qiao Yu
- Directed by: Huang Lijia
- Country of origin: China
- Original language: Chinese
- No. of episodes: 35 episodes

Production
- Production locations: Chengdu, Sichuan

Original release
- Network: Chengdu Radio & Television

The Big Life (Chinese:大生活) is a Chinese TV series produced together by Beijing Television, Shanghai Media Group, Beijing Guolichangsheng Movie & Television Culture Communication Co., Ltd, whose script was adapted by the novel of the same name The big life written by Qiao Yu. It starred Zhang Guoli, Zhao Tao, Zhang Jiayi, Han Yuqin, directed by Huang Lijia. And it was shortlisted 15th STVF White Magnolia Awards on May 11, 2010.
