= Omade Lotsen =

General of the Tibetan Empire (?-661)

Tibetan name
- Tibetan: འོ་མ་ལྡེ་ལོད་བཙན
Transcriptions
- Wylie: 'o ma lde lod btsan
- THL: o ma dé lö tsen

Omade Lotsen (Tibetan: འོ་མ་ལྡེ་ལོད་བཙན, ? – 661) was a general of the Tibetan Empire.

Omade served as high minister during Songtsen Gampo's reign. He came into conflict with another general Khyungpo Pungse, and sowed discord among Khyungpo and the emperor. Finally, was dismissed, and had to retire to his castle.

Omade was appointed as the Lönchen after Gar Tongtsen's dismissed by Mangsong Mangtsen due to his age. During his term, Tibet tried to make amends with Tang China. He concocted a plot to overthrow the emperor but failed, then was captured and executed in 661. His position turned back to his predecessor, Gar Tongtsen.

Political offices
Preceded by Gar Tongtsen Yülsung	"Lönchen" of Tibet; 659? – 661	Succeeded by Gar Tongtsen Yülsung
