= The Pretending Lovers =

- Film poster
- Traditional Chinese: 假裝情侶
- Simplified Chinese: 假装情侣
- Hanyu Pinyin: Jiǎzhuāng Qínglǚ
- Directed by: Liu Fendou
- Written by: Liu Fendou; Jiao Huajing
- Produced by: Liu Jing; Chen Zhixi
- Starring: Huang Bo; Jiang Yiyan
- Cinematography: Chen Ying
- Edited by: An Dong
- Music by: Tian Ge
- Production company: TIK Films
- Distributed by: TIK Films; China Film Group Corporation
- Release date: 24 June 2011 (China)
- Running time: 93 minutes
- Country: China
- Language: Mandarin

The Pretending Lovers (Chinese: 假装情侣) is a 2011 Chinese romantic comedy film co-written and directed by Liu Fendou. It stars Jiang Yiyan as Shen Lu and Huang Bo as her fake boyfriend. The rest of the cast includes Zhang Mo, Xia Jiawei, Wang Yansu, Li Haibin, Zhang Yuhan, and Gao Yifei. The film premiered in China on June 24, 2011. It tells a love story between an insurance salesman and a suspiciously psycho girl.

== Plot ==
Shen Lu (Jiang Yiyan) is a suspiciously psycho girl. And Chen Wen (Huang Bo) is an insurance salesman. One day, when they meet in a square, Shen invites him to pretend as her boyfriend and Chen agreed because he is single for long. Every day, Chen goes to the hospital to see Shen and plays games with her. After a considerable period of time, Chen falls in love with Shen. But one day, Shen suddenly lost the news and disappeared. When they meet again, Shen put forward to end this game of pretending lovers.

== Cast ==
- Huang Bo as Chen Wen, a salesman of an insurance company.
- Jiang Yiyan as Shen Lu, a suspiciously psycho girl.
- Zhang Mo as the roommate
- Xia Jiawei as the boss
- Wang Yansu as the nurse
- Li Haibin as the doctor
- Zhang Yuhan as colleague
- Gao Yifei as colleague

== Soundtrack ==
No.	Title	Singer(s)	Length
1.	"An Extra (临时演员)" (Opening theme)	Huang Bo
2.	"So This Is Love (原来这就是爱)" (Interlude)	Sam Lee
3.	"Afraid To Fall In Love With You (害怕爱上你)" (Interlude)	Sitar Tan

== Release ==
The Pretending Lovers was released on June 24, 2011 in China.

== Reception ==
Douban gave the film 6.0 out of 10.
