= Dêngqên County =

Dêngqên County 丁青县 • སྟེང་ཆེན་རྫོང་།
- County
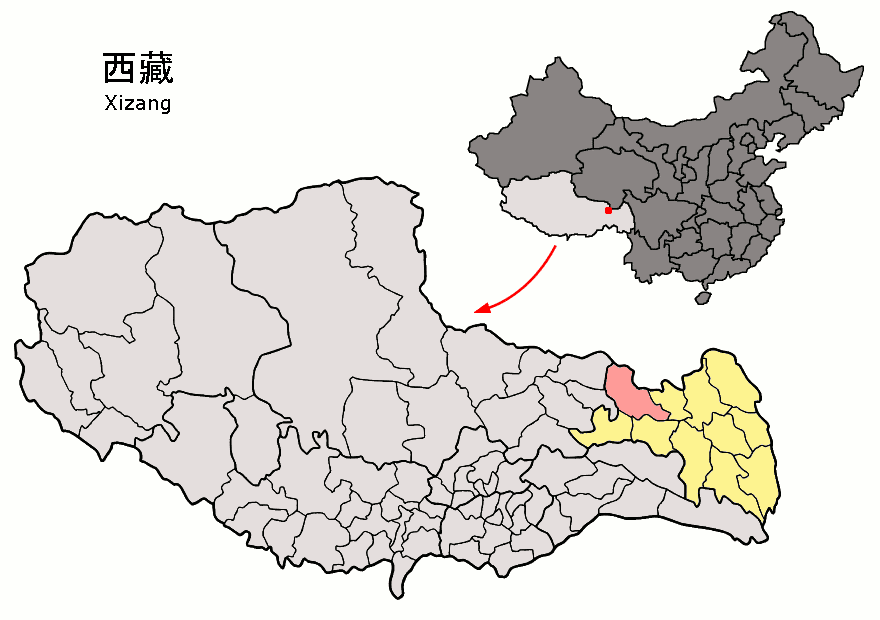
- Location of Dêngqên County (red) in Chamdo City (yellow) and the Tibet A.R.

- Location of the seat in the Tibet A.R. Dêngqên (China)
- Coordinates: 31°24′51″N 95°35′50″E
- Country: China
- Autonomous region: Tibet
- Prefecture-level city: Chamdo
- County seat: Dêngqên

Area
  - Total: 12,368.49 km^{2} (4,775.50 sq mi)

Population (2020)
  - Total: 98,677
  - Density: 7.9781/km^{2} (20.663/sq mi)
- Time zone: UTC+8 (China Standard)
- Website: dingqing.changdu.gov.cn

Dêngqên County

Chinese name
- Simplified Chinese: 丁青县
- Traditional Chinese: 丁青縣
Transcriptions
Standard Mandarin
- Hanyu Pinyin: Dīngqīng Xiàn

Tibetan name
- Tibetan: སྟེང་ཆེན་རྫོང་།
Transcriptions
- Wylie: steng chen rdzong
- Tibetan Pinyin: Dêngqên Zong

Dêngqên County (Tibetan: སྟེང་ཆེན་རྫོང་།; Chinese: 丁青县) is a county of Chamdo City in the east of the Tibet Autonomous Region, China.

== Administrative divisions ==
Dêngqên County is divided in 2 towns and 11 townships.

Name	Chinese	Hanyu Pinyin	Tibetan	Wylie
Towns
Dêngqên Town	丁青镇	Dīngqīng zhèn	སྟེང་ཆེན་གྲོང་རྡལ།	steng chen grong rdal
Trido Town	尺犊镇	Chǐdú zhèn	ཁྲི་རྡོ་གྲོང་རྡལ།	khri rdo grong rdal
Townships
Gyangngön Township	觉恩乡	Jué'ēn xiāng	གྱང་སྔོན་ཤང་།	gyang sngon shang
Sagang Township	沙贡乡	Shāgòng xiāng	ས་སྒང་ཤང་།	sa sgang shang
Damdoi Township	当堆乡	Dāngduī xiāng	གཏམ་སྟོད་ཤང་།	gtam stod shang
Sado Township	桑多乡	Sāngduō xiāng	ས་མདོ་ཤང་།	sa mdo shang
Muta Township	木塔乡	Mùtǎ xiāng	དམུ་ཐ་ཤང་།	dmu tha shang
Bota Township	布塔乡	Bùtǎ xiāng	འབོ་ཐ་ཤང་།	'bo tha shang
Pada Township	巴达乡	Bādá xiāng	སྤ་ཟླ་ཤང་།	spa zla shang
Gangé Township	甘岩乡	Gānyán xiāng	གྭ་ངད་ཤང་།	gwa ngad shang
Gata Township	嘎塔乡	Gātǎ xiāng	གྭ་ཐ་ཤང་།	gwa tha shang
Sertsa Township	色扎乡	Sèzhā xiāng	སེར་ཚ་ཤང་།	ser tsha shang
Zhezhung Township	协雄乡	Xiéxióng xiāng	ཞེ་གཞུང་ཤང་།	zhe gzhung shang

== Transport ==
- China National Highway 317

== Climate ==
Climate data for Dêngqên, elevation 3,873 m (12,707 ft), (1991–2020 normals, extremes 1981–2010)
Month	Jan	Feb	Mar	Apr	May	Jun	Jul	Aug	Sep	Oct	Nov	Dec	Year
Record high °C (°F)	16.6 (61.9)	15.4 (59.7)	20.2 (68.4)	20.4 (68.7)	23.5 (74.3)	26.3 (79.3)	26.7 (80.1)	26.7 (80.1)	24.4 (75.9)	21.8 (71.2)	15.9 (60.6)	14.8 (58.6)	26.7 (80.1)
Mean daily maximum °C (°F)	2.3 (36.1)	4.3 (39.7)	7.2 (45.0)	11.1 (52.0)	15.2 (59.4)	18.3 (64.9)	19.7 (67.5)	19.5 (67.1)	17.3 (63.1)	11.7 (53.1)	6.8 (44.2)	3.6 (38.5)	11.4 (52.6)
Daily mean °C (°F)	−5.7 (21.7)	−3.2 (26.2)	0.0 (32.0)	3.8 (38.8)	7.9 (46.2)	11.3 (52.3)	12.8 (55.0)	12.4 (54.3)	9.9 (49.8)	4.4 (39.9)	−1.1 (30.0)	−4.8 (23.4)	4.0 (39.1)
Mean daily minimum °C (°F)	−12.0 (10.4)	−9.2 (15.4)	−5.4 (22.3)	−1.7 (28.9)	2.2 (36.0)	6.1 (43.0)	7.7 (45.9)	7.4 (45.3)	5.0 (41.0)	−0.3 (31.5)	−6.6 (20.1)	−11.1 (12.0)	−1.5 (29.3)
Record low °C (°F)	−22.1 (−7.8)	−21.0 (−5.8)	−17.1 (1.2)	−9.1 (15.6)	−6.3 (20.7)	−1.3 (29.7)	0.2 (32.4)	−1.3 (29.7)	−2.7 (27.1)	−8.8 (16.2)	−18.1 (−0.6)	−23.4 (−10.1)	−23.4 (−10.1)
Average precipitation mm (inches)	3.9 (0.15)	7.4 (0.29)	18.1 (0.71)	31.2 (1.23)	60.4 (2.38)	120.4 (4.74)	134.6 (5.30)	119.2 (4.69)	102.1 (4.02)	50.8 (2.00)	12.1 (0.48)	3.5 (0.14)	663.7 (26.13)
Average precipitation days (≥ 0.1 mm)	4.1	7.3	10.7	13.1	17.1	21.5	21.8	19.8	19.4	14.2	5.5	3.5	158
Average snowy days	7.7	11.0	15.3	17.4	7.5	1.1	0.1	0.1	1.0	11.8	7.9	5.0	85.9
Average relative humidity (%)	44	46	51	54	58	65	68	67	69	66	54	47	57
Mean monthly sunshine hours	209.8	188.3	207.0	212.0	223.7	188.7	190.9	193.8	198.2	208.9	223.9	229.4	2,474.6
Percentage possible sunshine	65	60	55	54	52	44	44	48	54	60	72	73	57
Source: China Meteorological Administration

== Gallery ==
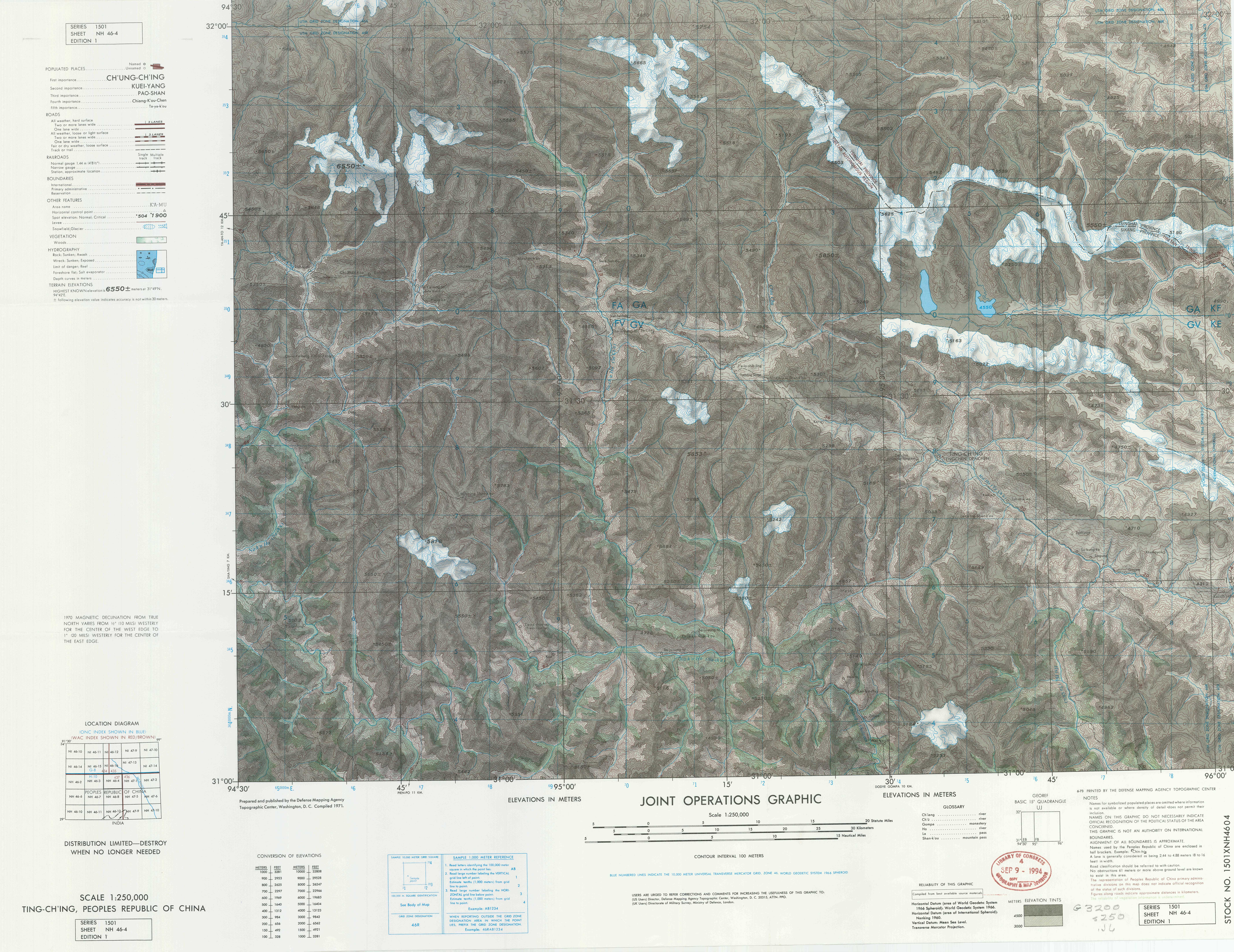

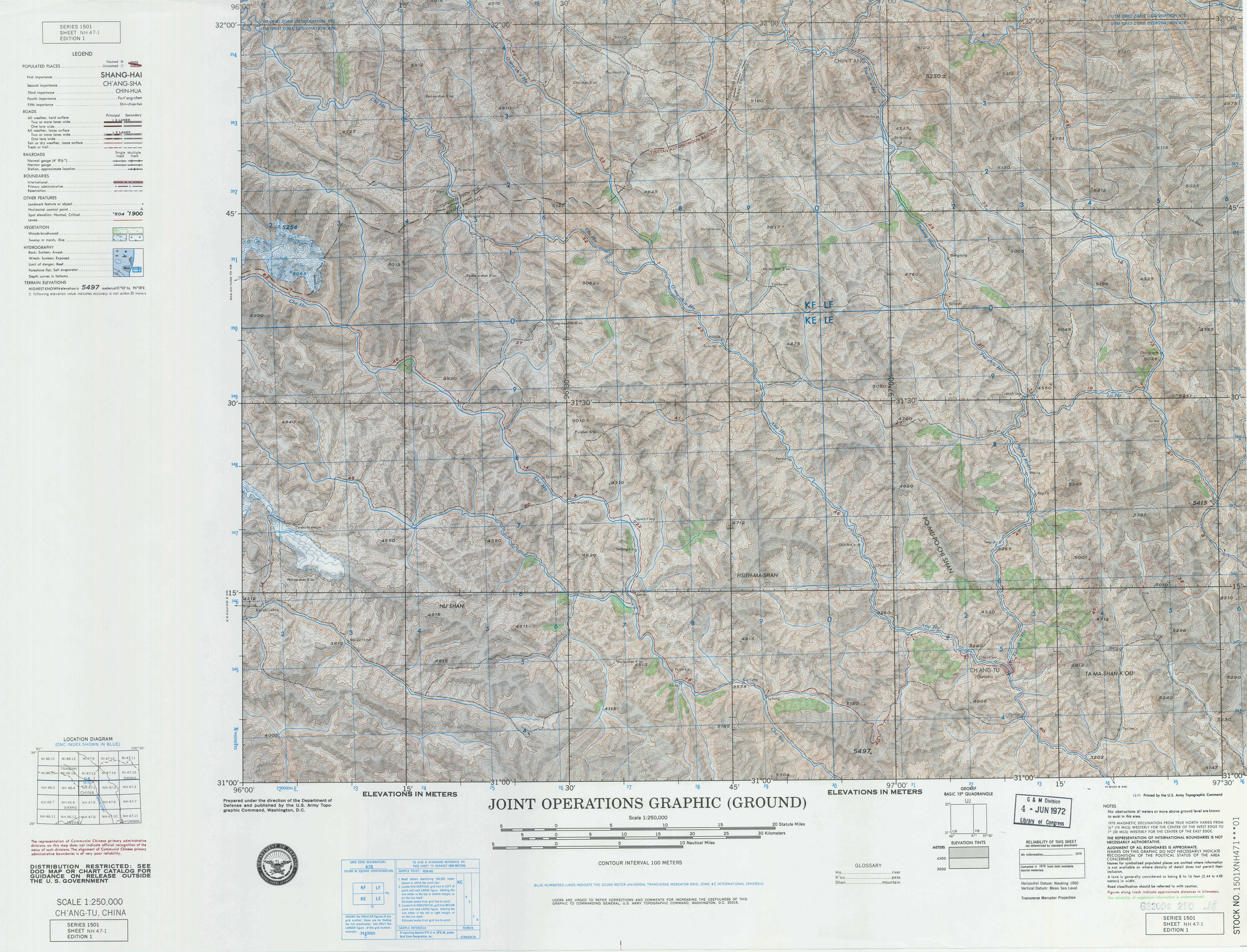
