= Wang Xiaojie =

Chinese general

Wang Xiaojie (王孝傑) (died February 8, 697), formally the Duke of Geng (耿國公), was a Chinese military general and politician of the Chinese Tang dynasty and Wu Zetian's Zhou dynasty, serving in campaigns against Tibet, Eastern Turks, and Khitan and briefly serving as chancellor during Wu Zetian's reign. He was killed in 697 in a battle against Khitan's khan Sun Wanrong.

== During Emperor Gaozong's reign ==
It is not known when Wang Xiaojie was born, but it is known that his family was from the vicinity of Tang dynasty's capital Chang'an. He was said to have had a successful military career during the reign of Emperor Gaozong. In 678, he served under the general Liu Shenli (劉審禮), the assistant to the chancellor Li Jingxuan in a campaign against Tibet. Li's army suffered a great defeat at the hands of the Tibetan general Gar Trinring Tsendro ("Lun Qinling" (論欽陵) in Chinese), and both Liu and Wang were captured by Trinring. When Wang was presented to the Mangsong Mangtsen, the king of Tibet, Mangsong Mangtsen was surprised by Wang's appearance and stated, "Your appearance is like my father's," and began to weep. As a result, he spared Wang and treated him well, finally returning him to Tang. After returning to Tang, Wang continued to serve as a general.

== During Wu Zetian's reign ==
As of 692, Emperor Gaozong's wife Wu Zetian was reigning. At that time, the general Tang Xiujing, who was then the commandant at Xi Prefecture (西州, roughly modern Turfan Prefecture, Xinjiang), was requested that an army be launched to recover four garrisons that had fallen to Tibet in 670 -- Qiuzi, Yutian, Shule, and Suiye. Because Wang had lived in Tibet for some time, he was considered knowledgeable about Tibet, and Wu Zetian commissioned him to command the army against Tibet, assisted by the general Ashina Zhongjie (阿史那忠節). In winter 692, Wang defeated Tibetan forces and recaptured the four garrisons.

In 694, Wang again achieved victories near Qinghai Lake against Tibetan general Gar Tsenyen Gungton ("Bolun Zanren" (勃論贊刃) in Chinese) and Western Turks' Shixing Khan Ashina Tuizi (阿史那俀子). He was soon made the minister of defense (夏官尚書, Xiaguan Shangshu) and given the designation Tong Fengge Luantai Sanpin (同鳳閣鸞臺三品). While serving as chancellor, he was also then commissioned to command an army against Eastern Turks, formally under the command of Wu Zetian's lover Huaiyi, but did not appear to actually engage the Eastern Turks' forces. He was again commissioned to attack Eastern Turks' in 695, but when Tibet attacked later that year, he was commissioned to attack Tibet instead. In 696, when he and fellow chancellor Lou Shide engaged Tibetan forces, however, they were defeated by Gar Trinring Tsendro and Trinring's brother Gar Tsenba ("Lun Zanpo" (論贊婆) in Chinese). Lou was demoted, while Wang was reduced to commoner rank.

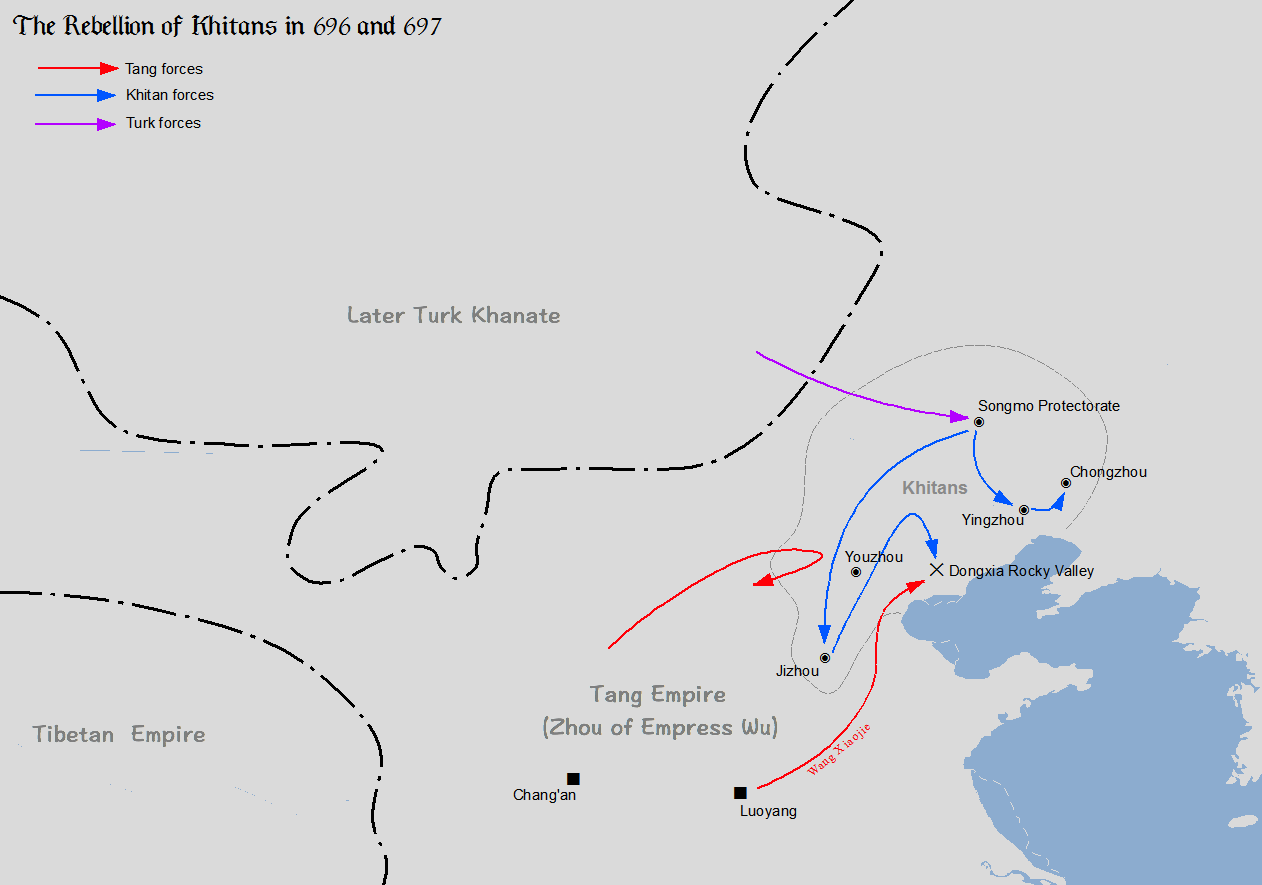
Map of the Khitan Rebellion during which Wang Xiaojie was defeated

Later that year, however, there was a major Khitan rebellion under Li Jinzhong, who died later that year and was succeeded by his brother-in-law Sun Wanrong. In 697, with Khitan forces penetrating deep into Zhou territory, Wu Zetian commissioned Wang to be the acting commander of an army against Khitan, assisted by Su Honghui (蘇宏暉), commanding some 170,000 men. In spring 697, Wang engaged Sun at Dongxia Rocky Valley (東硤石谷, near modern Tangshan, Hebei). Wang himself commanded the forward troops and had initial successes, but as he fought near a cliff, Khitan forces counterattacked, and Su Honghui fled. Wang fell off the cliff and died, and the army suffered heavy losses. Wang's secretary Zhang Shuo reported back to Wu Zetian in Luoyang (now capital) and stated, "Wang Xiaojie was brave and willing to fight to the death. He faithfully served the empire, fought into enemy territory, and fought many with few. But he had no backup, and so he was defeated." Wu Zetian posthumously honored Wang as the minister of defense and created him the Duke of Geng. She also ordered that Su Honghui be put to death, although before her emissaries arrived, Su had won other battles, and was spared the death penalty. Wang's son Wang Wuze (王無擇) later served as a general during the reign of Emperor Xuanzong.

== Notes and references ==
- Old Book of Tang, vol. 97.
- New Book of Tang, vol. 111.
- Zizhi Tongjian, vols. 205, 206.
