= Lou Shide =

Tang dynasty official (630-699)

Lou Shide (Chinese: 婁師德; 630–699), courtesy name Zongren (宗仁), formally Viscount Zhen of Qiao (譙貞子), was a Chinese military general and politician of the Chinese Tang dynasty and Wu Zetian's Zhou dynasty, twice serving as chancellor during Wu Zetian's reign.

== Background ==
Lou Shide was born in 630, during the reign of Emperor Taizong. He was from Zheng Prefecture (鄭州, roughly modern Zhengzhou, Henan). When he was young, he passed the imperial examination and was made the sheriff of Jiangdu County (江都, in modern Yangzhou, Jiangsu) – a formally low post that was, however, regarded as important as Jiangdu was one of the largest cities of the empire. While serving there, his superior Lu Chengye (盧承業) the secretary general of Yang Prefecture (揚州, roughly modern Yangzhou), was greatly impressed by him, and stated, "You are material to be an emperor's assistant. I should entrust my descendants to you, and how can I treat you as a subordinate?"

== During Emperor Gaozong's reign ==
During the reign of Emperor Taizong's son Emperor Gaozong, when Tang was having recurrent wars with Tufan. Emperor Gaozong sought volunteers to serve in the army against Tufan, and Lou Shide volunteered. Emperor Gaozong was pleased and gave him the honorific title of Chaosan Daifu (朝散大夫) and allowed him to serve in the army, and it was said that he had much achievement in the army. In 678, when the chancellor Li Jingxuan suffered a major defeat against the Tufan general Gar Trinring Tsendro ("Lun Qinling" (論欽陵) in Chinese) and Li's deputy, the general Liu Shenli (劉審禮) was captured by Tufan, Emperor Gaozong sent Lou to reorganize Li's disorganized troops, and further then as an emissary to Tufan. Lou met with Trinring's brother Gar Tsenba ("Lun Zanpo" (論贊婆) in Chinese) and was able to enter into a peace agreement with Lun Zanpo. In addition to his censor post, he was also made the military advisor to the commander at Heyuan Base (河源軍, in modern Xining, Qinghai) and put in charge of the agricultural affairs of the base. By 682, however, Tufan was said to be again attacking Heyuan, and Lou prevailed over Tufan forces eight straight times. Emperor Gaozong gave Lou the position of a deputy minister but made him the deputy commander at Heyuan, stating to him in the edict, "You have both civil and military talents. Do not decline these posts."

== During Wu Zetian's reign ==
By 693, Emperor Gaozong's powerful wife Wu Zetian had become "emperor" of a new Zhou dynasty, interrupting Tang. (Emperor Gaozong had died in 683, and his sons Emperor Zhongzong and Emperor Ruizong had successively served as emperor, but Wu Zetian deposed them both and in 690 claimed the title of emperor.) In 693, Lou Shide was referred to as the minister of defense (夏官尚書, Xiaguan Shangshu), when she gave him the designation Tong Fengge Luantai Pingzhangshi (同鳳閣鸞臺平章事), making him a chancellor de facto. It was said that he was tolerant, honest, and careful. Once, when he was set to go with fellow chancellor Li Zhaode to meet Wu Zetian, he was walking slowly because he was obese, and Li had to repeatedly stop to wait for him. Li, in displeasure, yelled at him, "You country bumpkin!" Lou smiled and responded, "If I am not a country bumpkin, who can be a country bumpkin?" Around that time, his younger brother was made the prefect of Dai Prefecture (代州, in modern Xinzhou, Shanxi). Before his brother departed, Lou asked him, "I am now a chancellor, and you are a prefect. These are high honors and will draw jealousy. How can you avoid disaster?" His brother responded, "From now, even if someone spat at my face, I will just wipe it off. Hopefully I will not cause you worries." Lou instead responded:

This actually worries me. If someone spat at you, that means that he is angry at you. If you wipe off the spit, this shows resistance, and will make him angrier. Remember: do not wipe off the spit. It will dry itself. You should smile and let him spit at you.

(This response, however, drew heavy criticism from the modern Chinese historian Bo Yang, who opined that Lou's comment showed a lack of self-respect and willingness to stand for what was right, for the purpose of protecting his position.)

In 694, while still a chancellor, Lou was made the commander of several bases, including Heyuan, but was later recalled being the minister of justice (秋官尚書, Qiuguan Shangshu) and was created the Baron of Yuanwu. In 696, he was commissioned to be the deputy commander of an army to attack Tufan, assisting Wang Xiaojie. 15 days later, he was made the imperial censor reviewing central government affairs (左肅政大夫, Zuo Suzheng Daifu), and he continued to serve as chancellor with the Tong Fengge Luantai PIngzhangshi designation. Two months later, he and Wang were defeated by a Tufan army commanded by Trinring and Lun Zanpo at Mount Suluohan (素羅汗山, in modern Gannan Tibetan Autonomous Prefecture, Gansu). As a result, Wang was demoted to commoner rank, while Lou was demoted to be the military advisor to the prefect of Yuan Prefecture (原州, roughly modern Guyuan, Ningxia). It was said that when the paperwork of the demotion was given to Lou to sign, he was initially surprised and stated, "Do not have a single office left?" But he then immediately stated, "This is fine, this is fine."

In 697, while still serving at Yuan Prefecture, Lou was recalled being acting Fengge Shilang (鳳閣侍郎), the deputy head of the legislative bureau of government (鳳閣, Fengge), and was again made chancellor with the designation Tong Fengge Luantai Pingzhangshi. Later that year, in the middle of an attack by Khitan's khan Sun Wanrong, Wu Zetian commissioned Lou, assisted by the general Shazha Zhongyi (沙吒忠義), to command some 200,000 men to defend against the Khitan attack. Sun's army, however, collapsed when the Eastern Tujue khan Ashina Mochuo attacked his home base and captured it. In the aftermath, Wu Zetian sent Wu Yizong (武懿宗) the Prince of Henan (the grandson of her uncle Wu Shiyi (武士逸)), Lou, and Di Renjie to try to comfort the people of the region. Soon after this, at Lou's recommendation, Di was made chancellor as well and became a well-trusted advisor to Wu Zetian until Di's death in 700. However, Di was said to initially not know that Lou had recommended him and often suggested assignments out of the capital Luoyang for Lou. Wu Zetian intentionally asked Di, "Is Lou Shide capable?" Di responded, "When he served as a general, all he could do was to protect the border. I do not know if he is capable." She then asked, "Is Lou a good judge of character?" Di responded, "I have served with him, and I do not know him as a good judge of character." She then responded, "I trust you because he recommended you. I think he is a good judge of character." Later, Di was said to have commented, "Lord Lou has great grace. I have been tolerated him for so long, and I did not know his grace." Later in 697, Lou was made acting Nayan (納言), the head of the examination bureau (鸞臺, Luantai) and a post considered one for a chancellor. He was also created the Viscount of Qiao.

In 698, while still serving as chancellor, Lou was made the commander of the forces in the Longyou (隴右) region (i.e., modern southern Gansu). He died in 699, while still serving in that role, at Hui Prefecture (會州, roughly modern Baiyin, Gansu).

== Notes and references ==
- Old Book of Tang, vol. 93.
- New Book of Tang, vol. 108.
- Zizhi Tongjian, vols. 202, 203, 205, 206.
