= The Eloquent Ji Xiaolan =

- Also known as: The Bronze Teeth

Chinese name
- Traditional Chinese: 鐵齒銅牙紀曉嵐
- Simplified Chinese: 铁齿铜牙纪晓岚
Transcriptions
Standard Mandarin
- Hanyu Pinyin: Tiěchǐ Tóngyá Jǐ Xiǎolán
- Genre: historical, ancient costume comedy
- Written by: Chan Man-kwai; Zou Jingzhi; Zheng Wanlong; Wang Zhenqian; Wang Chen; Shi Hang; Gu Yan; Ma Junxiang; Wang Hailin
- Directed by: Liu Jiacheng; Zhang Guoli; Lo Changan
- Starring: Zhang Guoli; Wang Gang; Zhang Tielin; Yuan Li
- Opening theme: "Intellectuals are not useful at all"
- Ending theme: "The Eloquent Ji Xiaolan"
- Country of origin: China
- Original languages: Mandarin, Cantonese
- No. of seasons: 4
- No. of episodes: 173

Production
- Executive producer: Deng Jie
- Production location: Beijing
- Running time: 43-45 minutes
- Production companies: Beijing Yahuan Studio Production co., LTD

Original release
- Network: TVB Jade
- Release: January 8, 2001 – July 17, 2009

The Eloquent Ji Xiaolan (Chinese: 铁齿铜牙纪晓岚; pinyin: Tie chī tóng yá jì xiǎolán) is a Chinese historical comedy television series chronicling fictitious events in the life of Qing official Ji Xiaolan in the reign of the Qianlong Emperor. It stars Zhang Guoli as Ji Xiaolan, Wang Gang as Manchu official Heshen and Zhang Tielin as the Qianlong Emperor.

The series first aired in mainland China on January 8, 2001 and concluded on July 17, 2009, with 173 episodes broadcast over four seasons. It was a critical success in China and was nominated in 2003 for three Feitian Awards for Outstanding Actor (Zhang and Wang) and Outstanding Historical Television Series, the latter of which it won.

== Premise ==
Scholar Ji Xiaolan was a close official to the Qianlong Emper alongside Heshen, the emperor's favorite albeit extremely corrupt official with whom Ji is locked in a political rivalry. While Ji considers the welfare of the common populace when discussing matters at court, he is frustrated constantly by Heshen who undermines him by appealing to the emperor's ego for his own means. Throughout his time in court, Ji finds himself involved in numerous facets of political affairs that are often complicated by personal ones of the emperor, from which he is challenged to not only ensure justice for the empire's commonfolk, but also to use his counsel as a moral compass for the Son of Heaven to ensure the prosperity of his reign.

== Cast ==
=== Main ===
- Zhang Guoli as Ji Xiaolan, a prominent official for the imperial Qing court and patron of the arts, poetry, and other intellectual pursuits.
- Wang Gang as Heshen, the Emperor's favorite who often leverages his favoritism to his political and financial advantage, and is responsible for several instances of corruption in the court.
- Zhang Tielin as the Qianlong Emperor, the sixth monarch of the Qing Empire.
- Yuan Li as Du Xiaoyue, a fictional Peking Opera singer and martial artist who helps lead a peasant revolt when the corruption of officials results in famine and the deaths of several civilians. She later becomes a main assistant of Ji.

=== Supporting ===
- Cynthia Khan (season 1) as Mo Chou, Du Xiaoyue's oath elder sister. After her fiance the peasant revolt leader was murdered when attempting to bring the corruption of the Qing to court, she succeeds his leadership and seeks justice for him. She later becomes a main assistant of Ji. She would not appear in later seasons after taken as an imperial consort.
- Zhao Minfen (seasons 1 and 2), Wang Liyuan (season 3), and Yan Minqiu (season 4) as Empress Xiaoshengxian, the mother of the Qianlong Emperor.
- Xiang Neng (season 1) as Fuk'anggan, a Manchu general and staunch supporter of Heshen.
- Pan Xiaoli as Si Guniang (season 1), a swordswoman seeking revenge on the emperor as her father was executed for a slanderous poem / Zhao Qing (season 2), the daughter of a censor.
- Yang Xiyan (season 2), Zhang Lei (season 3), and Liu Kaifei (season 4) as Xing'er, a servant in Ji's estate.
- Zhang Chunnian as Liu Quan, the main steward of Heshen's.
- Zhang Ting (season 3) as Lu Linlang, a love-interest of the Qianlong Emperor who becomes the target of assassination by a jealous Step Empress. She later becomes a main assistant of Ji in place of Du.

=== Others ===
==== Season 1 ====
- Cong Peixin as Censor Hong
- Wu Zhen as Hong Xia
- Shu Yaoxuan as Shang Rong
- Liu Weihua as Yunti, Prince Xun of the Second Rank
- Huo Siyan as Xiangcao
- Zeng Jing as Lu Chang'an
- Han Fuyi as Huang Bingtang
- Zhang Jing as Tao Xiangyun
- Li Xiaolei as Chen Weiyuan
- Li Qingxiang as Businessman Jin
- Ruan Danning as Su Qinglian
- Yan Huaili as Chen Huizu
- Jia Dazhong as Wang Shanwang
- Yang Junyong as Wang Tingzan
- Liu Yuanyuan as Chuntao

==== Season 2 ====
- Liu Yanjun as Zhao Xinjin
- Ma Zijun as Zhang Wanjie
- Hong Zongyi as Zuo Shankui
- Bai Qiulin as Zhao Wenlong
- Zou Hewei as Min De
- Song Dong as Wu Shengqin
- Wang Shenshen as Liao Fan
- Ma Weifu as Xu Qingyu
- Xu Meiling as The procuress
- Wei Wei as Xiao Hongyan
- Ma Yili as Yan Ruyu
- Sun Yan as Dai Zhan
- Gao Yuqing as Hong Zhongyu
- Pan Guangju as Yan Ji
- Lu Hualei as Lao Cai
- Zhang Yuchun as Wu Shaofu
- Lu Donglai as Ye Tingbin
- Cui Jian as Qi Sutu
- Zhong Yuan as Gu Dali
- Fu Di as Li Chunmei
- Wang Bing as Li Xiaochun
- Zhang Jingyu as Hong San
- Lu Xiaoyi as Qi An
- Dang Yongde as Li San
- Ma Jie as Hai Sheng
- Ma Lun as Gui Ning
- Hao Zi as Mian En
- Wang Jingming as Wu Shenglan
- Li Geng as Jia San
- Guo Lihong as Xiaofang
- Yuan Hongqi as Ren Gang
- Lin Yongjian as Lu Chao
- Jiang Xinyan as Yao Qin

==== Season 3 ====
- Huang Xiaolei as Changsi
- Xu Xiaodan as Hoifa-Nara, the Step Empress
- Li Yixiao as Honglian
- Li Lihong as Yue Jinzhi
- He Jinlong as Guo Min
- Liu Naiyi as Ma Rufeng
- Hao Subei as Yu Tiexin
- Song Dong as Gu Yezhi
- Chen Dacheng as A Gui
- Zhang Yue as Mingyue
- Wang Jianing as Chu Ming
- Zhang Mo as Yuan Hong
- Li Shijiang as Hua Jianmeng
- He Shengwei as Liu Shunmin
- Xia Lixin as Sai Huahong
- Wu Xiaodong as Hong Hai

==== Season 4 ====
- Yan Ni as Ge Song'er
- Hu Guangzi as He Wenjin
- Gao Xinde as Chunhong
- Han Yuqin as Mei Yingxue
- Du Jun as Yi'ertai
- Zhao Hongfei as Cui Yuyan
- Miriam Yeung as Qianqian
- Shi Lin as Lizhi
- He Yongsheng as Ren Caomu
- Li Heng as Tao Dabao
- Liu Yong as Fugui

== Historical inaccuracies ==
- The Qianlong Emperor and Ji Xiaolan were 39 and 26 years Heshen's seniors respectively, but in the series the three are depicted as peers.
- Heshen did not have 13 concubines, while the Emperor did not have 18 daughters.
- When Prince Yunti died, Heshen and Fuk'anggan were only 5 and 1 respectively, but in Season 1 the three were described as peers.
- Qing emperors were never prohibited from taking Han women as imperial consorts as Seasons 1 and 3 suggested.
- The event of deposing the Empress in Season 3 happened in 1765, while the event of marrying a princess to Fengšeninde in Season 1 happened in 1789, 12 years after the death of the Empress Dowager. Historically the Empress was deprived of her rights as empress but never formally demoted to a consort.
- Fuk'anggan was not a bastard of the Qianlong Emperor as implied in Season 4.

== Reception ==
=== Critical reception ===
The Eloquent Ji Xiaolan received consistently high viewership in mainland China during its broadcast. On Chinese database Douban, the first season has an audience score of 8.4 out of 10, the second 8.1, third 7.5, and fourth 7.7. For their performances, lead actors Zhang Guoli, Wang Gang, and Zhang Tielin became collectively known in Chinese media as 'the Iron Triangle'.

=== Accolades ===
Award	Year	Category	Nominee	Result	Ref.
Feitian Awards	2003	Outstanding Actor	Zhang Guoli	Nominated	
Feitian Awards	2003	Outstanding Actor	Wang Gang	Nominated	
Feitian Awards	2003	Outstanding Historical Television Series	The Eloquent Ji Xiaolan	Won	
