= Zhang Guoli =

Chinese actor and film director (born 1955)

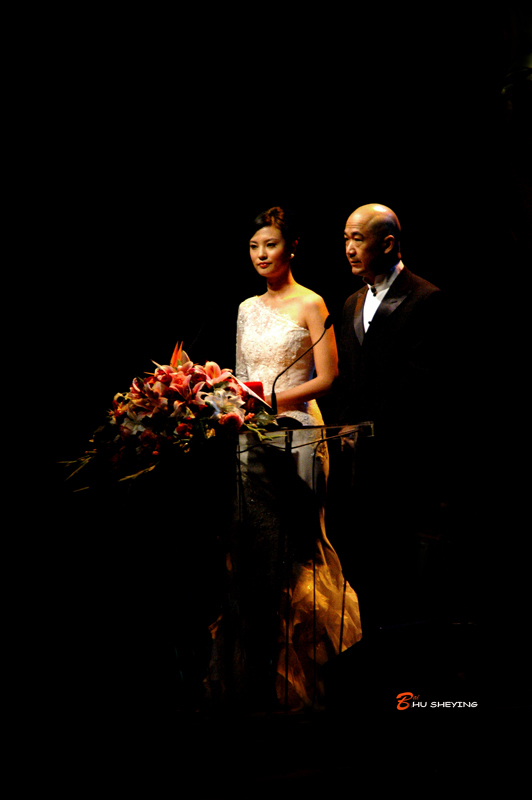
- Born: 17 January 1955 (age 70); Tianjin, China
- Occupation(s): Actor, film director
- Years active: 1988-present
- Spouse(s): Luo Xiuchun (former); Deng Jie
- Children: Zhang Mo
- Awards: Golden Rooster Awards – Best Actor; 2013 Back to 1942 Hundred Flowers Awards – Best Actor; 1996 Hun Zai Beijing Golden Eagle Awards – Best Actor; 1998 Records of Kangxi's Travel Incognito Shanghai Television Festival – Best Actor; 2008 Golden Wedding

Chinese name
- Traditional Chinese: 張國立
- Simplified Chinese: 张国立
Transcriptions
Standard Mandarin
- Hanyu Pinyin: Zhāng Guólì

Zhang Guoli (born 17 January 1955) is a Chinese actor and film director who was a xiangsheng actor before he started working on films and television series. He is mostly known for his roles playing the Emperor in various dramas involving Qing Dynasty imperial China. He has also hosted the CCTV New Year's Gala in 2014. In 2009, he became the second Chinese actor to win the "Grand Slam", after winning "Best Actor" at the three biggest Chinese-language television awards including the Feitian Award, the Golden Eagle Award and the Magnolia Award.

He is married to actress Deng Jie and he has a son named Zhang Mo from a previous marriage, who is also an actor. Zhang is a practising Buddhist and a member of the Taiwanese Buddhist organisation Dharma Drum Mountain. He has a dharma name, Changsheng (常升).

== Filmography ==
Film
Year	Title	Role	Notes
1988	Wanzhu 顽主		
1994	You Are Not Sixteen 你没有十六岁		
1996	Hunzai Beijing 混在北京		
1999	Tarzan 泰山	Tarzan	Mandarin dub
2001	Yisheng Tanxi 一聲嘆息	Liang Yazhou	
2002	Cell Phone 手機	Fei Mo	
2003	Finding Nemo 海底總動員	Marlin	Mandarin dub
2006	The 601st Phone Call 第601個電話		director
2008	Lady Cop & Papa Crook 大搜查之女	Xu Banshan	
2009	The Founding of a Republic 建國大業	Chiang Kai-shek	temporary director
2012	The Monkey King: Uproar in Heaven 大闹天宫3D		
2012	Back to 1942 一九四二	Master Fan	
2013	Who Is Your Dish		
2014	Bringing Joy Home 2014		
2016	Everybody's Fine		
2018	The Faces of My Gene		
2019	Song of Youth		
2023	Under the Light		

Television
Year	Title	Role	Notes
1983	Wanwan De Shijing 彎彎的石徑		
1986	Changcheng Xiangnan Yanshen 長城向南延伸		
1987	Haohaizi 好孩子		director
1987	Dushi Fangcaodi 都市芳草地		
1988	Sishui Weilan 死水微瀾		
1991	Bianjibu De Gushi 編輯部的故事		
1993	Haima Gewuting 海馬歌舞廳		
1994	Zaixiang Liu Luoguo 宰相劉羅鍋	Qianlong Emperor	
1995	Beijing Shenqiu De Gushi 北京深秋的故事		
1996	Qingbo 315 請撥315	Wang Li	director
1996	Zongtong Taofang 總統套房		
1996	Ai De Wandao 愛的灣道	Xu Minghao	
1997	Cixi Xixing 慈禧西行	Wu Yong	
1997	Weiqing Shike 危情時刻	Wen Zhenshan	
1997	Hongyan 紅岩		
1997	Records of Kangxi's Travel Incognito 康熙微服私訪記	Kangxi Emperor	
1998	Bolichang Chuanqi 琉璃廠傳奇	Jin Baoyuan	
1998	Records of Kangxi's Travel Incognito 2 康熙微服私訪記2	Kangxi Emperor	director
1999	Caishen Dao 財神到	Zhao Gongming	
1999	Yipin Furen Zhima Guan 一品夫人芝麻官	Liu Mingchuan	
1999	Records of Kangxi's Travel Incognito 3 康熙微服私訪記3	Kangxi Emperor	
2000	Jingcheng Da Zhuangshi 京城大狀師	Liu Jixian	
2000	Zhongcheng 忠誠	Gao Changhe	
2001	The Bronze Teeth 鐵齒銅牙紀曉嵐	Ji Xiaolan	
2001	Huanxi Yinyuan 歡喜姻緣	Shi Daci	director
2002	The Bronze Teeth II 鐵齒銅牙紀曉嵐2	Ji Xiaolan	
2002	Wo Zheyi Beizi 我這一輩子	Fuhai	director
2002	Records of Kangxi's Travel Incognito 4 康熙微服私訪記4	Kangxi Emperor	director
2003	Buyi Zhixian Fan Ruhua 布衣知縣梵如花	Fan Ruhua	director
2003	Buyi Tianzi 布衣天子	Hong Li	
2003	Zhongguo Xingjing Zhi Jiuyue Fengbao 中國刑警之九月風暴	Mayor Zhang	
2003	Zhengtuo 掙脫	Shen Dongjian	
2003	The Heaven Sword and Dragon Saber 倚天屠龍記	Cheng Kun	
2003	Heroic Legend 萍蹤俠影	Emperor	
2004	The Bronze Teeth III 鐵齒銅牙紀曉嵐3	Ji Xiaolan	
2004	Song Liansheng in City Hall 宋連生坐堂	Song Liansheng	
2004	Wuyue Guihua Xiang 五月槐花香	Tong Fengquan	
2005	The Juvenile Qianlong Emperor 少年寶親王	Yongzheng Emperor	producer
2005	New Legend of Jigong 濟公新傳	Qin Hui	director, producer
2005	Emerald on the Roof 屋頂上的綠寶石	Tang Qishan	
2005	Shaonian Jiaqing 少年嘉慶	Qianlong Emperor	
2005	Longfeilong Fengfeifeng 龍非龍鳳非鳳	Shiduo	director
2006	Qinxiong Redi 親兄熱弟	Yu Dahai	artistic director
2006	Hongmofang 紅墨坊	Ji Xiaolan	
2006	Love at First Fight 武十郎	Wu Dingdang	
2006	Jin Hun 金婚	Tong Zhi	
2007	Xiangai Dounan 想愛都難	Lin Daming	artistic director
2007	Memories in China 中國往事	Cao Ruqi	
2008	The big life 大生活	Liu Dong	
2008	Ganzou Nide Youyu 趕走你的憂鬱	Zhou Wen	director
2008	The Bronze Teeth IV 鐵齒銅牙紀曉嵐4	Ji Xiaolan	
2018	Win the World	Lü Buwei	
2021	A Love for Dilemma	Nan Jianlong	
