= Wang Gang (actor) =

Chinese actor and host

- 王刚
- Born: December 22, 1948 (age 77); Changchun, Jilin, Republic of China
- Education: Central Academy of Drama
- Occupations: Actor, host
- Years active: 1980s–present
- Spouses: Xiao Du (m. 1978–1979) Cheng Fangyuan (m. 1996–2001) Zheng Yandong (m. 2006)
- Children: Wang Tingting (daughter); Wang Yiding (son)

Chinese name
- Traditional Chinese: 王剛
- Simplified Chinese: 王刚
Transcriptions
Standard Mandarin
- Hanyu Pinyin: Wáng Gāng

Wang Gang (born December 22, 1948) is a Chinese actor and host. He is best known for his role as Heshen, a corrupt Qing dynasty official favoured by the Qianlong Emperor, in many television series. He first came to prominence in 1986 for hosting the CCTV New Year's Gala. Wang has also hosted the CCTV programme Friends since 2000. He won a Golden Eagle Award for Best Supporting Actor in 1997 for his performance in Liu the Hunchback Chancellor (宰相刘罗锅). He also hosts Liaoning TV's talk show Wang Gang Telling Stories (王刚讲故事).

== Personal life ==
Wang has married three times. He married his first wife announcer Xiao Du (小杜) in 1978, with whom he had a daughter, Wang Tingting (王婷婷). The couple divorced in 1979.

Wang married for the second time in October 1996, to singer Cheng Fangyuan (成方圆), they divorced in 2001.

On 8 November 2006, Wang married a woman named Zheng Yandong (郑艳东) he met on the internet in 2005 and has been chatting with since then. In August 2008, when Wang was around 60 years old, his wife gave birth to their son: Wang Yiding (王一丁).

== Filmography ==
=== Film ===
Year	English title	Chinese title	Role	Notes
1983	A Bride For A Ride	王老虎抢亲	Zhou Wenbin	
1984	Flickered Flame	跳动的火焰	Lin Nong	
1984	Struggle with Beauty-Snake	智斗美女蛇	A bully	
1984	Children of Ba Mountain	巴山儿女	Yu Mengshi	
1984		点燃朝霞的人		
1984		人生没有单行道		
1985	Sank to the Indian Ocean	雷北利号沉没在印度洋		
1986	In Their Prime	他们正年轻	Platoon leader	
1987	The Grave Robbers	东陵大盗		
1987	The Imperial Cannon Team	大清炮队	Wang Yansheng	
1989	Country Folk	乡下人	Bei Hai	
1989	We Are the World	我们是世界	Magistrate Ma	
1989	Founding Ceremony	开国大典		
1990	The Ozone Layer Vanishes	大气层消失		
1991	The Deadly Dart	索命飞刀	Hao Sanshi	
1991	Green Green Leaves of Home	青春无悔		
1991	Rescue Mission	飞越绝境		
1992	Man Behind the Sun 2	黑太阳731续集之杀人工厂		
1992		悲烈排帮		
1993		绝杀	Kawasaki	
1993	The Horror Night	恐怖的夜		
1993	Autumn Harvest Uprising	秋收起义		
1993	Kill the Northeast King	谋刺关东王	Qi Ge Qiao	
1994	Stepping into Prosperity	步入辉煌		
1994		金客·商客·镖客		
1997		惹是生非		
2003		团圆两家亲		
2005		六面埋伏	Lao Jin	
2005	One Stone and Two Birds	一石二鸟	Guijianchou	
2007		我用真心换真情		
2008	Kung Fu Dunk	功夫灌篮	Wang Biao	
2010	Don Quixote	魔侠传之唐吉可德	Sang Qiu (Sancho Panza)	
2010	The First Secretary	第一书记	Minister of Railways	
2010	You Deserve to Be Single	活该你单身	A patient	
2012	Racing Legends	赛车传奇	Father	

=== Television ===
Year	English title	Chinese title	Role	Notes
1996	Prime Minister Liu Luoguo	宰相刘罗锅	Heshen	
1997		九马疑踪		
1998		明镜高悬		
1999	Thunderstorm Rider	霹雳菩萨	Shi Tao	
2000	The Eloquent Ji Xiaolan	铁齿铜牙纪晓岚1	Heshen	
2001	Winter is not Cold	冬天不冷	Zheng Dening	
2001		长缨在手	Qian Muyong	
2002	The Eloquent Ji Xiaolan 2	铁齿铜牙纪晓岚2	Heshen	
2002		梦断紫禁城	Heshen	
2002		公正的心		
2002	The Heaven Sword and Dragon Saber	倚天屠龙记	Seventh Prince	
2003		中国传世经典名剧		
2003	Prime Minister of the Southern Song Dynasty	南宋传奇之蟋蟀宰相	Emperor Lizong	
2003		青天衙门	Yue Ying	
2003		布衣天子	Heshen	
2004	The Prince of Han Dynasty	大汉天子2	Zhufu Yan	
2004		御前四宝	Xue Yin	
2004		沧海百年	Heshen	
2004		夏日里的春天	Chun Tian's father	
2004		五月槐花香	Lan Yigui	
2004		种啥得啥	Director Chang	
2004	Fenglin Pavilion	凤临阁	Liu Jin	
2004		天不藏奸	Li Yuan	
2004	The Eloquent Ji Xiaolan 3	铁齿铜牙纪晓岚3	Heshen	
2004	Young Prince	少年宝亲王	Dong Tianle	
2005	Sigh of His Highness	一生为奴	Sengge Rinchen	
2005	Moment in Peking	京华烟云	Niu Sidao	
2005	The Affaire in the Swing Age	江山风雨情	Wang Cheng'en	
2005		六面埋伏	Lao Jin	
2005	A Famous Physician Song Liansheng	宋莲生坐堂	Fan Wutong	
2005	Bao Qingtian	凌云壮志包青天	Minister Pang	
2006	Wu Zi Bei Ge	无字碑歌	Lou Shide	
2006	King of Nanyue Kingdom	南越王	Zhao Gao	
2006	The Story of Han Dynasty	楚汉风云	Zhao Gao	
2006		玉碎	Zhao Rugui	
2006		谁主中原	Wei Zhongxian	
2006		三揭皇榜	Wei Zhongxian	
2006	Young Jiaqing	少年嘉庆	Heshen	
2006	Iron General Ah Gui	铁将军阿贵	Heshen	
2006		皇后驾到	Zhu Liangzu	
2007		青天衙门2	Tie Xuan	
2007		皇上二大爷	Zheng Guotai	
2007	The Gilded Signboard	金字招牌	Manager Ha	
2007		换子成龙	The captain	
2007	Jinggang Mountain	井冈山	guest	
2007	Legend of Shaolin Temple	少林寺传奇	Gao Yang	
2008	The Rich and Poor	贫富人生	Father	
2008		红梅花开	Wang Zhenhua	
2008		壮士出征	Yang Tianqiao	
2009	The Eloquent Ji Xiaolan 4	铁齿铜牙纪晓岚4	Heshen	
2009		少年讼师纪晓岚	Wu Qi	
2009	Water Transport Wharf	漕运码头	Xu Jiachuan	
2010		缘去来	Sheng Ming	
2010	Luogu Lane	锣鼓巷	Xin Wenyuan	
2011	You Are My Happiness	你是我的幸福	Director Ding	
2011	It is Hard to Labor with an Empty Belly	人是铁饭是钢	Liu Tieshao	
2012	Men in Ronghe Town	荣河镇的男人们	Village Director	
2012	Huangmei Drama Master Legendary	黄梅戏宗师传奇		
2012	Secret Emissary	密使	guest	
2013	New Newsroom Story	新编辑部故事		
2013		谁是真英雄	Ni Jincai	
2013	Demon Hunting	猎魔	Li Tianhao	
2014	Family Party	家宴	Lao Feng	
2015	The Amazing Strategist Liu Bo Wen	神机妙算刘伯温	Li Shanchang	
2016	Incredible Family	吾儿可教	Guan Jian	
2017	Boy Hood	我们的少年时代	Bai Zhou's father	
2018	Mystery of Antiques	古董局中局	Yao Lai	
2019	Chong Er's Preach	重耳传奇	King of Lirong	
2019		小镇警事	Wei Fude	
2020	You are My Destiny	你是我的命中注定	Juwuba	
2020	Shichahai	什刹海	Mr. Ding	
2020	The Last Cook	末代厨娘	Professor Xi	
TBA		典当行	Yin Tongshan	

== Autobiography ==
- 我本顽痴：王刚自传. Suzhou, Jiangsu: Jiangsu Literature and Art Publishing House. April 1, 2010. ISBN 9787539936758.

== Awards ==
Year	Nominated work	Award	Category	Result	Notes
1996	Liu the Hunchback Chancellor	Golden Eagle Award	Best Supporting Actor	Won	
1999		Golden Mike Award	Gold Award	Won	
2007	Yu Sui	26th Flying Apsaras Awards	Outstanding Actor	Nominated	
